= 1914 Eastern Suburbs season =

← 1913	1915 →

Eastern Suburbs (now known as the Sydney Roosters) competed in the 7th New South Wales Rugby League (NSWRL) premiership in 1914.

== Details ==
No.

Position
Player

5 Dan Frawley – WG 9 Larry 'Jersey' O'Malley – PR 10 Sid 'Sandy' Pearce – HK 23 Percy White – PR 43 Barney Dalton – WG 45 Bob Williams – PR 51 Fred Kinghorn – FB 54 Charlie Lees – PR 61 Arthur Halloway – HB 62 Wally Messenger – CE 64 D. Flannery – PR

No.

Position
Player

65 Bob Tidyman – WG 66 Jack Watkins – PR 67 Les Cubitt – FE 69 Claude Nicholson – WG 72 George Challis – FB 73 W. Watson – WG 74 W. Allmen – WG 75 ?. Butler – WG 76 ?. Martin – WG 77 H. McNamarra – WG 78 Arthur Davidson – WG

== Premiership results ==
- Premiership Round 1, Saturday 2 May 1914.

Glebe 14 (2 Tries; 4 Goals) defeated Eastern Suburbs 12 (2 Tries; 3 Goals) at the Wentworth Park ground.

- Premiership Round 2, Saturday 9 May 1914.

Eastern Suburbs 10 (2 Tries; 2 Goals) defeated Western Suburbs 2 (Goal) at Pratten Park.

- Premiership Round 3, Saturday 16 May 1914 .

Newtown 2 (Goal) defeated Eastern Suburbs 0 at Sydney Cricket Ground.

- Premiership Round 4, Saturday 23 May 1914.

Eastern Suburbs 10 (2 Tries; 2 Goals) defeated South Sydney 4 (Horder 2 Goals) at Sydney Cricket Ground.

- Premiership Round 5, Saturday 30 May 1914.

Eastern Suburbs 17(3 Tries; 4 Goals) defeated North Sydney 7(Try; 2 Goals) at the Sydney Cricket Ground.

- Premiership Round 6, Saturday 13 June 1914.

Eastern Suburbs 15(3 Tries; 3 Goals) defeated Annandale 5(Try; Goal) at the Agricultural Ground.

- Premiership Round 7, Saturday 20 June 1914.

Eastern Suburbs 8(2 Tries; Goal) defeated Balmain 2 (Goal) at the Sydney Cricket Ground.

- Premiership Round 8, Saturday 11 July 1914.

Eastern Suburbs 28(4 Tries; 7 Goals; Field Goal) defeated Glebe 24(F. Burge 2, + 2 Tries; 6 Goals) at the Sydney Cricket Ground.

Easts managed to hold on against Glebe after leading at one stage 26–4.

- Premiership Round 9, Saturday 18 July 1914.

Eastern Suburbs 25 (5 Tries; 5 Goals) Defeated Western Suburbs 10( 2 Tries; 2 Goals) at Agricultural Ground.

- Premiership Round 10, Saturday 25 July 1914.

Newtown 6 (1 C. Russell, +1 Goals; 1 Field Goal) Defeated Eastern Suburbs 5(1 Try; 1 Goal) at Sydney Cricket Ground.

This was described as a thriller of a match with Newtown sneaking home in the dying minutes thanks to a penalty goal from their winger, Charles 'Boxer' Russell, who kicked a penalty goal from the sideline.

- Premiership Round 11, Saturday 1 August 1914.

South Sydney 10(Horder, McCabe Tries; Horder 2 Goals) Defeated Eastern Suburbs 5 (1 Try; 1 Goal) at the Sydney Cricket Ground.

- Premiership Round 12, Saturday 8 August 1914.

Eastern Suburbs 13(3 Tries 1; Goal 1, Field Goal 1) defeated North Sydney 11(Gosper, King, O'Deane Tries; Gray Goal) at North Sydney Oval.

- Premiership Round 13, Saturday 15 August 1914.

Annandale 16(4 Tries; 2 Goals) Defeated Eastern Suburbs 14(4 Tries; 1 Goal) at Wentworth Park.

- Premiership Round 14, Saturday 22 August 1914.

Balmain 9(1 Try; 1 Goal; 2 Field Goals) Defeated Eastern Suburbs 2(Goal) at the Sydney Cricket Ground.

== Table ==
Rank	Team	P	W	D	L	For	Ag	Diff	Pts
1	South Sydney	14	11	1	2	166	79	+87	23
2	Newtown	14	11	-	3	185	111	+74	22
3	Eastern Suburbs	14	8	-	6	164	122	+42	16
4	Balmain	14	6	4	4	132	111	+21	16
5	Glebe	14	7	1	6	187	140	+47	15
6	North Sydney	14	5	1	8	158	165	-7	11
7	Western Suburbs	14	3	-	11	104	231	-127	6
8	Annandale	14	1	1	12	106	243	-137	3

For - 164

- Tries 32
- Goals 34

Against - 122

- Tries 20
- Goals 31

== City Cup ==
- Final: The final, played between the two local rivals Eastern Suburbs and the South Sydney Rabbitohs at the Sydney Cricket Ground. The match attracted twice as many spectators as that year's premiership final.

City Cup Final; Eastern Suburbs 6 (W. Messenger, L. O'Malley Tries) defeated South Sydney 5 (H. Horder Try; H. Horder Goal).

Played at the Sydney Cricket Ground before 10,000 spectators, and won by Eastern Suburbs by 6 points to 5. South Sydney kicked off, and quickly had Eastern Suburbs defending. Watkins relieved the (pressure) by kicking out inside half-way, and then an unsuccessful attempt to goal from a [?] by Brown. Eastern Suburbs kept their opponents hemmed in for some time, but South Sydney [?] back to neutral territory, where Lees retired and he was replaced by O’Malley. South Sydney where in a good attacking position when Brown made a poor kick at goal from the field, and Eastern Suburbs forced. A little latter Brown was offside near his own line, and Messenger kicked over the (?) strongly. Cubitt being beaten by McCabe, [?] Messenger had made an attempt to goal from a penalty, the half-time whistle sounded with the scores at 0 all. Eastern Suburbs kept South Sydney busy defending their line. Messenger carried play into the opposition sides territory, and immediately afterwards the ball shot out from a ruck over the line, and Messenger dived and scored. He failed to convert. But was then prominent in several rushes which resulted in O’Malley crossing over. Messenger failed to goal. A few minutes later Cann secured and passed to Horder, who evaded several opponents before scoring and also converting. The play was waged at a lively pace until the fulltime whistle with the score 6 points to 5.

— Sydney Morning Herald

== Season highlights ==
- Won City Cup.
- Won third grade.
- Eastern Suburbs players to play for Australia were Arthur Halloway, Jack Watkins, Sid Pearce, Dan Frawley, Wally Messenger and Bob Tidyman.

Preceded by 1913	Season; 1914	Succeeded by 1915
