= 1913 Eastern Suburbs season =

Australian rugby league season

← 1912	1914 →

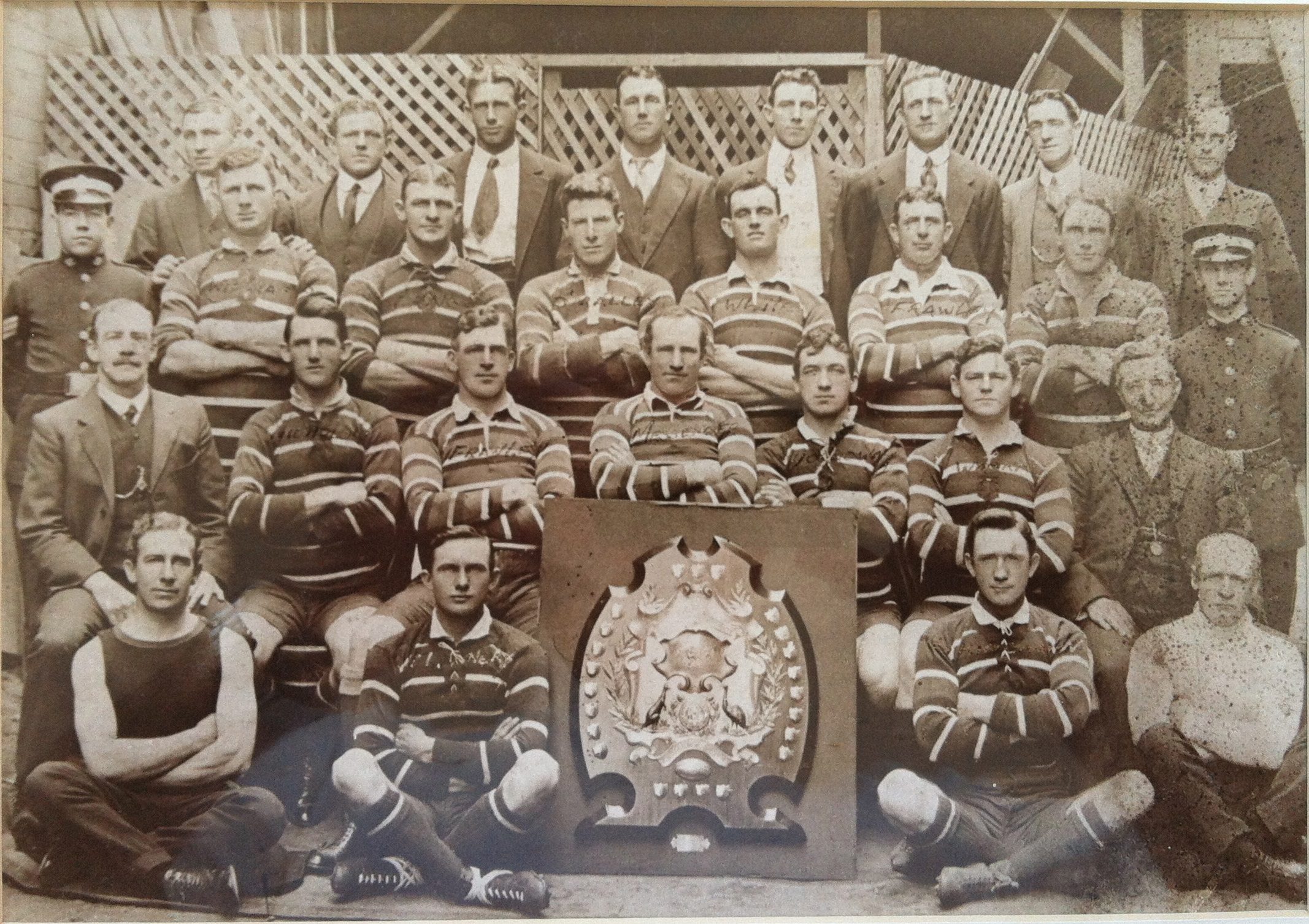
The 1913 Eastern Suburbs DRLFC team.

The 1913 Eastern Suburbs DRLFC season was the 6th in the club's history. Competing in the New South Wales Rugby Football League's 1913 Premiership and by finishing the season at the top of the ladder, won their 3rd consecutive title. The club was therefore awarded the Royal Agricultural Society Shield permanently.

== Players ==
No.

Position
Player

5 Dan Frawley – WG 8 Bob Mable – SR 9 Larry 'Jersey' O'Malley – PR 10 Sid 'Sandy' Pearce – HK 18 Herbert Henry 'Dally' Messenger – CE 23 Percy White – PR 28 Tom Bruce – HB 29 Eddie Griffiths – PR 45 Bob Williams – PR 51 Fred Kinghorn – FB 53 Eddie White – WG

No.

Position
Player

54 Charlie Lees – PR 61 Arthur Halloway – HB 62 Wally Messenger – CE 64 D. Flannery – PR 65 Bob Tidyman – WG 66 Jack Watkins – PR 67 Les Cubitt – FE 68 Ernest Gowenlock – WG 69 Claude Nicholson – WG 70 R. Maher – SR 71 S. Redmond – WG

== Match results ==
- Premiership Round 1, Saturday 3 May.

Eastern Suburbs 17 (3 Tries; 4 Goals) defeated Newtown 15 (3 Tries; 3 Goals) at the Sydney Cricket Ground.

This was the first rugby league club match played at the Sydney Cricket Ground.

- Premiership Round 2, Saturday 10 May.

Eastern Suburbs 15 ( 3 Tries; 3 Goals) defeated North Sydney 8 (Burge, Broomham Tries; McFarlane Goal) at the Agricultural Ground.

- Premiership Round 3, Saturday 17 May 1913.

Eastern Suburbs 9 (1 Try; 2 Goals; 1 Field Goal) defeated Western Suburbs 5 (1 Try; 1 Goal) at Pratten Park.

- Premiership Round 4, Saturday 24 May.

Eastern Suburbs 33 (9 Tries; 3 Goals) defeated Annandale 5 (1 Try; 1 Goal) at the Agricultural Ground

- Premiership Round 5, Saturday31 May.

Eastern Suburbs 12 (2 Tries; 2 Goals; 1 Field Goal) defeated Balmain 0 at Wentworth Park.

- Premiership Round 6, 14 June 1913'

Eastern Suburbs 12 (2 Tries; 3 Goals) defeated South Sydney 0 at Sydney Cricket Ground.

Eastern Suburbs success over South Sydney at the Cricket Ground gives the Tricolours a commanding lead in this years championship The reappearance of H. H. Messenger has toned up their back division to such an extent that they are now playing with all last years determination, whilst their vanguard is playing well to a man. South Sydney's form on Saturday was somewhat disappointing especially in view of their excellent form in their contest with Glebe. They were beaten all round with one exception and that was at full back, Hallett gave a remarkable display of superb Holding and kicking of the sodden and greasy ball His rival, Kinghorn, also did well and was reliable.

- Premiership Round 7, Saturday 28 June.

Eastern Suburbs 28 ( Tidyman 3, W. Messenger, +2 triees; H.H Messenger 5 Goals ) defeated ( Glebe 9 ( 3 Tries )) at Agricultural Ground.

When last years premiers were so closely tested by Newtown at the opening of the present club campaign, it was thought by many that the form of the Tricolours was deteriorating; but subsequent happenings and the Addition of H. H. Messenger have banished all fears in this respect. The presence of their old captain in the three-quarter line has had a revivifying influence, and their attacking machinery, which was so disjointed in their earlier matches, is now running smoothly as [ever].

This was described as a sensational match. containing some of the most sensational incidents witnessed all season. The "deadly tackling" of forwards O’Malley, Williams and Lees were singled out for special praise.

- Premiership Round 8, Saturday 5 July.

Newtown 14 (P. McCue, J. Barnett Tries; C. Russell 4 Goals) defeated Eastern Suburbs 11 (D. Frawley Try; D. Messenger 2, W. Messenger Goal; D. Messenger Field Goal) at the Sydney Cricket Ground.

Fullback
Fred Kinghorn
Three-Quarters
Dan Frawley
Bob Tidyman
Dally Messenger(c)
Wally Messenger
Halves
Les Cubitt
Arthur "Pony" Halloway
Forwards
Bob Mable
Sid 'Sandy' Pearce
Bob 'Botsy' Williams
Jack Watkins
Percy White
Charlie Lees

There has not been so much enthusiasm showed in a competition game since Newtown defeated Eastern Suburbs 12 months ago by the odd goal as on Saturday, when Newtown again vanquished the league champions, as the premiers have not been beaten in the last seven matches, they had the moral strength that comes of an unbeaten record . But the large public patronage to the meeting of these clubs showed that, despite the Eastern Suburb's clubs splendid accomplishments, it was not unreasonable to expect Newtown to triumph on this occasion. Newtowns superiority was in the forwards who secured the ball in the majority of scrums, and were more formidable in the ruck. Newtown tried an experiment that was successful. P. Cruise was introduced at stand-off half, and did well, although unfamiliar with the league game.

Within three minutes of the kick-off M'Cue scored for Newtown from a forward rush, but Russell failed at goal. For a few minutes it looked as if Newtown would carry all before them, but their opponents' backs answered every call. Then W. Messenger kicked a fine penalty goal . Newtown 3 points to 2. The pace became exceedingly fast. But superb tackling checked any spectacular play by the backs of either side. At length Newtown's efforts were rewarded. From a penalty kick the forwards rushed the ball over the line and from a ruck Barnett scored, and Russell converted Newtown, 9 points Eastern Suburbs, 2. Just after the kick out Eastern Suburbs were awarded a penalty, and Messenger scored a goal, the ball striking the post and bouncing over the bar. Newtown continued to attack. However penalties were frequent, and D. Messenger from one kicked another goal. This he supplemented by kicking a magnificent field goal from about 30 yards out. 8 points all. Eastern Suburbs were apparently becoming over-anxious, as frequent penalties were incurred for off-side and interference. Russell had five shots at goal, and just before the interval put one over the bar Newtown 10 points to 8.

Directly after restarting Russell, with the wind behind him, kicked his third goal, and Newtown led by 12 points to 8. Eastern Suburb's pack rushed the ball to Newtown's twenty-five and from a scum Halloway served Frawley, who fended off an opponent and scored, Newtown 12 points to 11. Newtown were not dismayed, however, and they again had Eastern Suburbs defending vigorously. The latter were penalised on their own twenty-five for not 'playing' the ball and Russell kicked his fourth goal. Newtown 14 points to 11. Each side in turn attacked, but the defence was resolute, and full-time was called with the scores unaltered. It was a grand struggle, and strenuous to a degree. Sydney Morning Herald

- Premiership Round 9, Saturday 12 July.

Eastern Suburbs 24 (P. White, ?, Lees Tries; Messenger 4 Goals; Messenger, Kinghorn Field Goal) defeated North Sydney 18 ( Sulivan 2, Green, Wilkinson tries; Miller 3 Goals) at the Sydney Cricket Ground. Crowd 7,000

Until North Sydney learn to put effective finishing touches to good attacking movements they cannot hope for success. In their match with Eastern Suburbs on Saturday they were practically on the offense from start to finish. They did excellently in midfield play, but when the got close to their opponents line they appeared to lose their heads, and consequently, many good chances were frittered away towards the close by the northerners who had several splendid opportunities of obtaining a lead, but something always went wrong at the critical time. It was not a brilliant game, and the Premiers share was not worthy of their reputation of the team. Their victory was almost due solely to the fact their champion goal kicker H. H. Messenger was in one of his happiest moods being responsible for ten out of the 24 points scored.

- Premiership Round 10, Saturday 19 July.

Eastern Suburbs 11 (3 Tries; 1 Goal) defeated Western Suburbs 10 (2 Tries; 2 Goals) at the Agricultural Ground.

- Premiership Round 11, Saturday 26 July.

Eastern Suburbs 19 (5 Tries; 2 Goals) defeated Annandale 8 (2 Tries; 1 Goal) at Wentworth Park.

- Premiership Round 12, Saturday 2 August.

Eastern Suburbs 13 (3 Tries; 2 Goals) defeated Balmain 5(1 Try; 1 Goal) at the Sydney Cricket Ground.

- Premiership Round 13, Saturday 9 August 1913.

Eastern Suburbs 14(???) defeated South Sydney 7(H. Thompson Try; H. Horder 2 Goals) at Sydney Cricket Ground.

The Rugby League premiership of 1913 is now another chapter in football history. Eastern Suburbs, by their brilliant victory over South Sydney, at the Sydney Cricket Ground on Saturday, have attained a position which is unassailable. This year's triumph by Eastern Suburbs is their third successive win Since the introduction of the 13 a side code. Throughout the season they have shown that they are a particularly well balanced combination, thoroughly sound in defence, and possessing attacking powers which are, taken all through, of a very high order. Saturday's success crowns a really splendid season's work, which has gained not only championship honours, but gives the club absolute possession of the shield presented by the Agricultural Society.

Saturday's game was a brilliant exhibition on the whole, and the winners share was characterised by sterling forward work, and nice Individualism by their backs. South Sydney, although outplayed, showed good form, and their first score was secured by that nippiness and cleverness which have marked many of their successes. Both teams were below their normal strength. H, H. Messegrer and Williams were badly missed by the Eastern side, and A. Butlers absence from the South team was Indeed a severe handicap.

- Premiership Round 14, Saturday 16 August 1913.

Glebe 14 ( Norman 2, Pert, Gray, Tries; Lego Goal) defeated Eastern Suburbs 9 ( Halloway, Try; D. Messenger Goal) at Agricultural Ground. Crowd 10, 000.

The last round of competition matches on Saturday had no bearing on the competition table, as Eastern Suburbs' position as premiers was unassailable.

== Ladder ==
	Team	Pld	W	D	L	PF	PA	PD	Pts
1	Eastern Suburbs	14	12	0	2	227	118	+109	24
2	Newtown	14	10	1	3	203	135	+68	21
3	South Sydney	14	9	0	5	200	132	+68	18
4	Glebe	14	8	0	6	198	161	+37	16
5	North Sydney	14	5	2	7	199	193	+6	12
6	Balmain	14	4	1	9	83	135	-52	9
7	Annandale	14	3	0	11	119	219	-100	6
8	Western Suburbs	14	3	0	11	115	251	-136	6

== Season highlights ==
- Won their 3rd successive premiership and in doing so became the first side to retain permanent ownership of the RAS shield.

The shield, Rugby leagues first trophy, was then presented by Eastern Suburbs to Dally Messenger in appreciation for all that he had done. This was Messengers final season.

- Won the Minor Premiership.
- Won the Presidents cup

== Notes ==
1. Dally Messenger retired.

Preceded by 1912	Season; 1913	Succeeded by 1914
