= 1915 Eastern Suburbs season =

← 1914	1916 →

The 1915 Eastern Suburbs DRLFC season was the 8th in the club's history. They competed in the NSWRFL's 1915 Premiership, finishing the season 5th (out of 8).

== Details ==
No.

Position
Player

5 Dan Frawley – WG 10 Sid 'Sandy' Pearce – HK 23 Percy White – PR 43 Barney Dalton – WG 54 Charlie Lees – PR 62 Wally Messenger – CE 64 D. Flannery – PR 65 Bob Tidyman – WG 66 Jack Watkins – PR 67 Les Cubitt – FE 69 Claude Nicholson – WG 72 George Challis – FB

No.

Position
Player

74 W. Allmen – WG 75 ?. Butler – WG 76 ?. Martin – WG 77 H. McNamarra – WG 78 Arthur Davidson – WG 79 Jim Duffy – WG 80 George McGowan – WG 81 Edward Coyne – WG 82 R. McKellar – WG 83 C. Barker – FB 84 Bob Linklater – SR 85 Abraham Jonas – WG

== Results ==
- Premiership Round 1. Saturday 8 May 1915,

Eastern Suburbs 25 defeated Annandale 3 at the Agricultural Ground.

- Premiership Round 2, Saturday 15 May 1915,

Eastern Suburbs 23 defeated North Sydney 6( E Taplin, S McFarlane Tries) at North Sydney Oval.

- Premiership Round 3, Saturday 22 May 1915,

Balmain 14 defeated Eastern Suburbs 7 at Sydney Cricket Ground.

- Premiership Round 4, Saturday 29 May 1915,

Newtown 5 defeated Eastern Suburbs 3 at the Sydney Cricket Ground.

- Premiership Round 5, Saturday 12 June 1915,

Eastern Suburbs 6 defeated Western Suburbs 3 at St Luke's Park.

- Premiership Round 6, Saturday 19 June 1915

South Sydney 10(Rex Norman, Thompson Tries; H Horder 2 Goals), defeated Eastern Suburbs 7 at the Agricultural Ground.

- Premiership Round 7, Saturday 26 June 1915

Glebe 15 defeated Eastern Suburbs 7 at Wentworth Park.

- Premiership Round 8, Saturday 3 July 1915,

Eastern Suburbs 32 defeated Annandale 3 at Hampden.

- Premiership Round 9, Saturday 10 July 1915

Eastern Suburbs Eastern Suburbs 35 defeated North Sydney 4(R. Farnell, H. Stewart Goals) at Hampden.

- Premiership Round 10, ??? 15 July 1915

Balmain 14 defeated Eastern Suburbs Eastern Suburbs 7 at the Agricultural Ground.

- Premiership Round 11, ??? 31 July 1915

Newtown 9( 3 Tries) defeated Eastern Suburbs Eastern Suburbs 8(2 Tries; 1 Goal) at Wentworth Park.

- Premiership Round 12, ??? 7 August 1915,

Eastern Suburbs 12 (2 Tries; 3 Goals) defeated Western Suburbs 5(1 Try; 1 Goal) at Hampden.

- Premiership Round 13, Saturday 14 August 1915,

South Sydney 5( Groves Try; H. Horder Goal) defeated Eastern Suburbs 3 at Agricultural Ground.

- Premiership Round 14, Saturday 21 August 1915,

Glebe 13 defeated Eastern Suburbs 5 at Hampden.

== Ladder ==
	Team	Pld	W	D	L	PF	PA	PD	Pts
1	Balmain	14	12	2	0	232	71	+161	26
2	Glebe	14	12	0	2	268	106	+162	24
3	Newtown	14	9	1	4	208	119	+89	19
4	South Sydney	14	8	1	5	157	94	+63	17
5	Eastern Suburbs	14	6	0	8	180	109	+71	12
6	Annandale	14	3	0	11	113	256	-143	6
7	Western Suburbs	14	2	0	12	67	200	-133	4
8	North Sydney	14	2	0	12	83	353	-270	4

== City Cup ==
CITY CUP FINAL - EASTERN SUBURBS IRRESISTIBLE.

Superior strategy, greater physical fitness and all round excellence in the dribbling game were factors which enabled Eastern Suburbs to defeat Glebe, scoring 22 points to 3, at the Agricultural Ground on Saturday in the presence of 5,000 spectators, and win the City Cup for the second year in succession.

At one point in the early stages of the game Glebe were hard pressed, and an opportune penalty on the wing led to Messenger goaling for Eastern Suburbs. intelligent anticipation by Cubitt led to a further score a few seconds later. P. White from loose play dribbled clear of opponents, and then gathering cleverly, shot out what appeared to be a reckless pass. However, Cubitt by a great effort, caught the ball and was over in a twinkling. Messengers kick was unsuccessful. Later on Watkins had to retire (replaced by H. Barker), and Messenger was temporarily crippled. However, these mishaps only stimulated Eastern Suburbs. A moment or two later a knock on by Hickey placed Tidyman in position, and the latter running strongly, brought Cubitt into position, and the latter scorcd Next Barker, who bael returned, showed a surprising turn of speed, and scorced near the corner. Miessenger landed a great goal. Before half time F. Burge obtained possession and passed to Henry Bolewski, who scored a few yards from the corner A Bolewski’s kick fell short. At the interval Eastern Suburbs led by 10 points to 3.

On resuming Jonas scored a somewhat lucky try. Next Cubitt scored behind the posts, and Messenger easily converted. Before the close Eastern Suburbs further Increased their score through McGowen, who snipped two very neat field goals, and at the close led by 22 points to 3

— Sydney Morning Herald Match Report

22	Eastern Suburbs
Tries	Cubitt 3, Jonas
Goals	Messenger 3
Field Goal	McGowan 2
3	Glebe
Try	H. Bolewski

== Season Highlights ==
- Won City Cup
- Won Presidents Cup
- Representatives:- Les Cubitt(NSW), George Challis(NSW), Jack Watkins(NSW).

Preceded by 1914	Season; 1915	Succeeded by 1916
