= 1916 Eastern Suburbs season =

← 1915	1917 →

The 1916 Eastern Suburbs DRLFC season was the 9th in the club's history. They competed in the 1916 NSWRFL season, finishing 4th (out of 8). Eastern Suburbs won the City Cup for the third consecutive season.

== Details ==
No.

Position
Player

10 Sid 'Sandy' Pearce – HK 23 Percy White – PR 45 Bob Williams – PR 54 Charlie Lees – PR 62 Wally Messenger – CE 66 Jack Watkins – PR 67 Les Cubitt – FE 72 George Challis – FB 79 Jim Duffy – WG

No.

Position
Player

82 R. McKellar – WG 83 C. Barker – FB 84 Bob Linklater – WG 85 Abraham Jonas – WG 86 Harry Caples – FE 87 Herb Gilbert – WG 88 T. Jones – FE 89 W. Raymond – FE 90 Francis Male – HB

== Season ==
- Premiership Round 1, Saturday 6 May 1916,

Eastern Suburbs 5 ( Cubitt Try; Barker Goal ) defeated Annandale 2 ( Heaney Goal ) at Wentworth Park.

- Premiership Round 2, Saturday 13 May 1916,

Newtown 11 ( Brown Try; Bain 2, Leonard ) defeated Eastern Suburbs 5 ( Cubitt Try; Messenger Goal ) at the Sydney Cricket Ground.

- Premiership Round 3, Saturday 20 May 1916,

North Sydney 6( Mayo 2 Tries) defeated Eastern Suburbs 4 at the Sydney Sports Ground.

- Premiership Round 4, Saturday 27 May 1916,

South Sydney 9 defeated Eastern Suburbs 7 at the Agricultural Ground.

- Premiership Round 5, Saturday 3 June 1916,

Eastern Suburbs 12 defeated Western Suburbs 5 at St Luke's Park.

- Premiership Round 6, Monday 5 June 1916,

Eastern Suburbs 2 drew with Glebe 2 at the Agricultural Ground.

- Premiership Round 7, Saturday 10 June 1916,

Balmain 5 ( Latta try, + goal ) defeated Eastern Suburbs 4 ( Messenger 2 goals ) at the Sydney Cricket Ground.

- Premiership Round 8, Saturday 17 June 1916,

Eastern Suburbs 13 defeated Annandale6 at Wentworth Park.

- Premiership Round 9, Saturday 24 June 1916;

Eastern Suburbs 14 ( Caples, White tries; Messenger 4 goals ) drew Newtown 14 ( Collins 2, McCue, Larkin tries; McCue goal ) at the Sydney Cricket Ground. Crowd 3, 000. Played at the Sydney Cricket Ground,

Following Newton's kick off, Challis found the line cleverly, and a moment or two latter Messenger kicked a penalty goal. Eastern Suburbs, 2 point to nil. Newtown's backs then combined nicely, but Bain missed a penalty from an easy position. Newtown continued the attack, but were driven back in turn by Gilbert and Watkins. Once a fine effort by Ryan, from a breaking scrummage looked dangerous but the subsequent faulty combination of Talbot and Brown spoilt the opportunity. Newtown's lack of finish a few minutes later caused a break down just when a score seemed imminent. Rigney then retired with an injured knee’ Bain falling back to the last line whilst Collins was requisitioned for the wing. Even play followed for a while, and then Capless after a splendid pass from Male, made a brilliant fending run and scored. Messenger scored a goal. Eastern Suburbs, 7 points to nil. Ryan, playing, the best forward game on the ground, put in a great effort and with support carried play to the Eastern Suburbs twenty-five. Here Gillespie short kicked over the line, and M Cue following fast scored. Bain failed at goal. Eastern Suburbs 7 point-; Newtown 3 The scores were unaltered at half time.

Newtown slightly reorganised their back division. Bain coming back to centre, and Brown acted as fullback, and the result proved the efficiency of this alteration. Eastern Suburbs were very formidable for a while, and only the Alertness of Collins on one occasion saved the situation for Newtown. The Newtown forwards, with Ryan and Townsend very prominent, began to trouble their opponents and after a succession of snappy attacks, Bain kicked for the comer, and Collins made a good try. Brown's kick dropped short Eastern Suburbs 7 points, Newtown 6. Play became highly exciting and both teams put forward great efforts, after many tense moments Newtown came again with an irresistible rush and from the scramble Larkin scored, Bain missed the goal. Newtown 9, Eastern Suburbs 7. A few minutes later Messenger made scores equal with a neat penalty goal - 9 points each. Again the Newtown pack rushed play to their opponents' zone, and Bain again using the cross-kick cleverly, paved the way for Collins to score his second try P. A. McQue converted, Newtown 14 points to 9. Eastern Suburb’s prospects appeared very poor but In a flash an opportunity came, a scrummage at midfield gave Male possession, and the half-back sent out a lob pass to Cubltt, who took the ball cleverly and went through the opposition with a characteristic dodgy run. Gilbert then joined in, and carried the ball to well within Newtown twenty-five, where a final pass sent White in between 'the posts. A splendid try, Messenger scored a goal. 14 points all This were the full time score.

.Sydney Morning Herald

- Premiership Round 10, Monday 26 June 1916,

Eastern Suburbs 12 defeated North Sydney 6(G.Green, Deane Tries) at Agricultural Ground.

- Premiership Round 11, ??? 1 July 1916,

Eastern Suburbs 24 ( Cubbitt 2, Caples, +1 Tries; Messenger 3, +3 Goals) defeated South Sydney ??( Rex Norman 2; G.McGowan 2 Goals).

South, who were previously unbeaten, led 10-9 with just 15 minutes remaining. The Tricolours finished with two late tries to Les Cubbitt and one to fullback Harry Caples, in what was described as "one of the most exciting finishes to a match in years".

- Premiership Round 12, Saturday 8 July 1916,

Eastern Suburbs 53 ( Gilbert 4 ( Cubbitt 4, + 3 Tries; W. Messenger 10 Goals) defeated Western Suburbs 0 at the Sydney Sports Ground. This was the club's biggest ever win against Wests and remained so until passed by the, Phil Gould, coached, Roosters outfit in 1998.

- Premiership Round 13, Saturday 15 July 1916'

Eastern Suburbs 8 ( Pearce, Jonas tries; Barker goal ) defeated Glebe 5 ( Pert try; Bellowski goal ) at Agricultural Ground. crowd 10,000

Walter Messenger's absence was keenly felt by Eastern Suburbs, as a moment after A Bolewski's kick-of, the emergency, Barker, missed two penalties, from comparatively easy ranges. Play was taken to Glebe's territory, but a penalty sent tho ball back L. Burge was then conspicuous for Glebe, but his transfer for Frank Burge went astray just as an excellent opening presented itself. The game was good, with both combinations exerting their utmost. The ‘spotting’ of the respective halfbacks and centres was excellent, Caples and Watkins (playing as an extra centre) for Eastern Suburbs, doing some particularly good work. Glebe, however, were playing strongly, and, although frequcntly checked, they tried persistently to break through their clever opponents.

At last they were successful! with a neat penalty goal by A. Bollewski. Glebe two pointa to nil. Eastern suburbs then showed wonderful energy, and quickly carried everything before them, Watkins, Williamis, Duffy and Caplés in turn did something for their side, and then from an irresistible rush on Glebe's line Pearce threw himself over, with half a dozen Glebe men endeavouring to check his dive. Barker scored a goal. Eastern Suburbs, 5 Glebe, 2 . A great struggle ensued, the pace being terrific, with the tackling as effective as has ever been exhibited in first class football. Watkins, Henry Bolewski, Gilbert, Caples, and Duffy were very determined in this phase of the play. Man after man were brought down, but still the thrilling attacks continued to the delight the big crowd. Some of the movements were so rapid, the ball being handled by so many men on each side, that it was impossible to follow them. But it may be said that the spectacular league gime has never produced so much excitement At half time the scores were. Eastern Suburbs, 5 Glebe, 2.

Then Eastern Suburbs went off again vigorously, and a nippy movement by Mckellar, Watkins and Jonas carried play to a handy position, but a little later Proctor, notwithstanding a formidable rush, cleared magnificently. Then Lego followed with a dash along touch, but Just as Glebe appeared likely to score the winger, in endeavouring to centre, miss kicked into touch. Eastern Suburbs' alertness, a second or two later was completely outwitted by a resourceful movement by J. Butler, from the heels of a scrummage at the Eastern Suburbs twenty-five But1er got the ball and set off round the open side, Eastern Suburbs fanned out to block the way, but the ex South Sydney man gave the ‘dummy’ pass, ran straight ahead, and passed on the ‘blind ' side to L. Burge to Pert, who ran over. It was a brilliant strategy. A. Bolewski's kick hit the post. Five points all. Play afterwards, though even, was still of the highest order with, Eastern Suburbs keeping a tight grip on the game, which a little later again swung in their favour. After attacking continuously for a time Male started a movement in which Csaples, Watkins Mckellar, Gilbert, and Jonnas were prominent. The last named player had an opening to the corner, as the result of Gilbert cleverly 'drawing' the defence before transferring to his flank man. The plan of attack was well conceived, and beautifully executed Watkins failed at goal. Eastern Suburbs 8 points; Glebe 5. Towards the close, Glebe made numerous efforts to equalise the scores but their opponents defence was too sound, and stalled them off. It was a remarkably brilliant and eventful game.

- Premiership Round 14, Saturday 22 July 1916,

Balmain 8 defeated Eastern Suburbs 7 at the Agricultural Ground.

== Table ==
	Team	Pld	W	D	L	PF	PA	PD	Pts
1	Balmain	14	11	0	3	181	100	+81	22
2	South Sydney	14	11	0	3	170	117	+53	22
3	Glebe	14	10	1	3	217	106	+111	21
4	Eastern Suburbs	14	7	2	5	170	89	+81	16
5	North Sydney	14	5	0	9	108	189	-81	10
6	Newtown	14	4	1	9	134	153	-19	9
7	Annandale	14	4	0	10	94	163	-69	8
8	Western Suburbs	14	2	0	12	92	249	-157	4

Preceded by 1915	Season; 1916	Succeeded by 1917
