= List of Sydney Roosters representatives =

The following players have represented the Sydney Roosters at rugby league since 1908.

== International Representatives ==
=== Australia ===
- Ferris Ashton
- Royce Ayliffe
- Jack Beaton
- Arthur Beetson
- Kerry Boustead
- John Brass
- Dave Brown
- Dave Brown
- Vic Bulgin
- Joe “Chimpy” Busch
- Hugh Byrne
- Harry Caples
- Todd Carney
- Lindsay Collins
- Lionel Cooper
- Ron Coote
- Boyd Cordner
- Angus Crichton
- Michael Crocker
- Les Cubitt
- Col Donohoe
- Terry Fahey
- Blake Ferguson
- John Ferguson
- Brad Fittler
- Craig Fitzgibbon
- Bryan Fletcher
- Daniel Frawley
- Mick Frawley
- Jake Friend
- Bob Fulton
- Aidan Guerra
- Arthur Halloway
- Nelson Hardy
- Mark Harris
- Shannon Hegarty
- Michael Jennings
- Lou Jones
- Kevin Junee
- Luke Keary
- John Lang
- Ian Mackay
- Paul McCabe
- Allan McKean
- Ross McKinnon
- Willie Mason
- Jeff Masterman
- John Mayes
- Dally Messenger
- Wally Messenger
- Anthony Minichiello
- Latrell Mitchell
- Jim Morgan
- Nate Myles
- Mark Nawaqanitawase
- Ernie Norman
- Ray Norman
- Rex Norman
- Andy Norval
- Wally O'Connell
- Larry O'Malley
- Arthur Oxford
- Sandy Pearce
- Joe Pearce
- John Peard
- Harry Pierce
- Luke Ricketson
- Albert Rosenfeld
- Ron Saddler
- Craig Salvatori
- Ian Schubert
- Bill Shankland
- Matt Sing
- Ray Stehr
- Johnno Stuntz
- James Tedesco
- Viv Thicknesse
- Bob Tidyman
- Anthony Tupou
- Daniel Tupou
- David Trewhella
- Andrew Walker
- Elwyn Walters
- Jack Watkins
- George Watt
- Bob Williams
- Craig Wing

=== England ===
- Phil Clarke
- Victor Radley
- Dominic Young

=== Great Britain ===
- Adrian Morley
- Ryan Hall

=== New Zealand ===
- Richie Barnett
- Dean Bell
- Jason Cayless
- Olsen Filipaina
- Gary Freeman
- Tony Iro
- Shaun Kenny-Dowall
- Andrew Lomu
- Jason Lowrie
- Joseph Manu
- Hugh McGahan
- Sam Moa
- Frank-Paul Nu'uausala
- Sam Perrett
- Quentin Pongia
- Gary Prohm
- Setaimata Sa
- Kurt Sherlock
- Iosia Soliola
- Dane Sorensen
- Kurt Sorensen
- Sio Siua Taukeiaho
- Roger Tuivasa-Sheck
- Jared Waerea-Hargreaves
- Naufahu Whyte
- Sonny Bill Williams

== State of Origin Representatives ==
=== New South Wales ===
- Braith Anasta
- Royce Ayliffe
- David Barnhill
- Boyd Cordner
- Angus Crichton
- Terry Fahey
- Blake Ferguson
- John Ferguson
- Brett Finch
- Brad Fittler
- Craig Fitzgibbon
- Bryan Fletcher
- Marty Gurr
- Kevin Hastings
- Michael Jennings
- Luke Keary
- Spencer Leniu
- James Maloney
- Willie Mason
- Anthony Minichiello
- Latrell Mitchell
- Mark Nawaqanitawase
- Mitchell Pearce
- Victor Radley
- Luke Ricketson
- Reece Robson
- Craig Salvatori
- Joseph Sua'ali'i
- James Tedesco
- David Trewhella
- Anthony Tupou
- Daniel Tupou
- Connor Watson
- Craig Wing

=== Queensland ===
- Kerry Boustead
- Dave Brown
- Lindsay Collins
- Michael Crocker
- Chris Flannery
- Jake Friend
- Trevor Gillmeister
- Paul Green
- Aidan Guerra
- Shannon Hegarty
- Justin Hodges
- Adrian Lam
- John Lang
- Paul McCabe
- Nate Myles
- Dylan Napa
- Matt Sing
- Brad Tessmann
- Robert Toia
- Paul Vautin
- Sam Walker
