= 1910 Eastern Suburbs season =

← 1909	1911 →

The 1910 season was the 3rd in which the Eastern Suburbs District Rugby League Football Club's competed in the New South Wales Rugby Football League premiership. They finished the season in 3rd position (out of 8).

== Players ==
No.

Position
Player

5 Dan Frawley – WG 7 Lou Jones – PR 8 Bob Mable – PR 10 Sid 'Sandy' Pearce – HK 13 Johnno Stuntz – WG 17 Harold Kelley – FE 18 Herbert Henry 'Dally' Messenger – CE 20 George Green – PR 23 Percy White – PR 25 Mick Frawley – PR 26 Bill King – FB

No.

Position
Player

28 Tom Bruce – HB 29 Eddie Griffiths – PR 41 Henry Kaufman – LK 43 Barney Dalton – SR 44 Charles Nash – PR 45 Bob 'Botsy' Williams – PR 46 Lesley Wylie – PR 47 G. Payne – SR 48 Eddie Mandible – PR 49 John 'Dinny' Campbell – CE 50 Leslie Cody – HB

== Pre Season ==
Dally Messenger will strip [suit up] for Eastern Suburbs on Saturday against Balmain. The knee that kept him from taking part in practically all of last season’s engagements is now quite well. He is in good condition, and very keen on returning to old form before the arrival of the Englishmen.

— Sydney Morning Herald

== Season ==
Round	Opponent	Result	Roosters Score	Opponent Score	Date	Venue	Crowd
1	Western Suburbs Magpies	Won	24 (6-3-0)	14 (2-4-0)	30 April 1910	Agricultural	500
2	North Sydney Bears	Won	11 (1-4-0)	7 (1-2-0)	14 May 1910	Agricultural	2000

- Premiership Round 3, Saturday 21 May 1910.

South Sydney 14 (T. Anderson 2, J.Rosewell, H.Butler Tries; Hallett Goal) defeated Eastern Suburbs 10 (Messenger 5 Goals) at the Agricultural Society's Ground. {{cquote |"South Sydney beat Eastern Suburbs On The Post"

"Quite 4000 people were present at the Agricultural Ground to witness this match which was a fine exposition of Northern Union rules. With only a few minutes to go South turned what seemed to be almost certain defeat into a highly meritorius victory. Their wonderful staying powers allowed them to secure the verdict by 14 points to 10."

At 3.25 Messenger led his side into the field. South followed a minute later. Messenger kicked off from the Randwick end. East secured a "free" almost immediately, but Messenger's effort, although a good one, did not secure the two points. South rallied, Davis putting in some effective work, but wild passing lost South a chance. The ever present Messenger then marked right in front of South's goal, this time making no mistake. East, 2 South nil. Play was even for a while, until Anderson secured, and made a dash for the line, but he was tackled by Messenger, and laid out for some minutes. A "knock-on" close to the line gave South a timely relief, but little ground was gained. Messenger was again in the limelight with a dodgy run, but he was tackled at the 25. Hot work in South's territory occurred until Conlin relieved. East were now playing like a book, and taking advantage of every opportunity. They obtained 6 points in as many minutes - the first two for a "free", the second two from a mark, and another "free", for offside making the six. Messenger's kicking was a revelation, the crowd cheering enthusiastically. The next item of interest, was some good work by the South's forwards, which brought the ball close to East's goal line, and from a scrum the ball came out to Rosewell, who raced over. Conlin failed to convert, the kick being a poor one. The interval arrived with the scores unaltered. Eastern Suburbs 8, South Sydney 3. On resuming East at once forced the pace, Messenger, and subsequently Frawley, making the efforts. The later was almost through when he was forced out at the corner. South then took a hand, a good passing bout (in which H Butler was the last to receive) resulting in South's total being increased to 6 points. Hallett failed to add the extras. Easts then became dangerous, Messenger being here, there and everywhere, rendering his side great assistance, as he seemed to be perfectly at home on both wings. On one occasion he "marked" in a good position whilst lying prostrate, but Frawley was not successful in his kick, the ball going a little wide. Play was uninteresting for a few minutes, the tackling of South still keeping at a high standard. Anderson tried to get through, but was not fast enough. Scrums became frequent, South being the first to initiate a passing movement in which all their threequarters participated, Anderson was grassed at halfway with only the fullback to beat. Off-side against the red and green gave Messenger another opportunity in the goal-potting line. It was his eighth kick at goal and his fifth success in the match, the ball sailing over beautifully. South then started to press, the passing showing great improvement. A brilliant run by Anderson, who skirted the line half the length of the field, ended in his securing a try. It was unconverted. The excitement was intense, and South were playing with wonderful heart. Time and again they swept down, and eventually Anderson again electrified the crowd by gathering in and rushing over. It was a grand try. Hallett converted. The whistle then blew, South winning a memorable contest by 14 points to 10.

Round	Opponent	Result	Roosters Score	Opponent Score	Date	Venue	Crowd
4	Annandale Dales	Won	20 (4-4-0)	12 (2-2-1)	28 May 1910	Wentworth	250
5	Newtown Jets	Won	20 (4-4-0)	11 (3-1-0)	25 June 1910	Agricultural	7000
6	Balmain Tigers	Lost	0 (0-0-0)	10 (2-2-0)	2 July 1910	Birchgrove	2500
7	Glebe Dirty Reds	Lost	10 (2-2-0)	14 (2-4-0)	16 July 1910	Wentworth	6000
8	North Sydney Bears	Won	16 (4-2-0)	5 (1-1-0)	23 July 1910	North Sydney	1800
9	Newtown Jets	Draw	4 (0-2-0)	4 (0-2-0)	30 July 1910	Metters	4000
10	Annandale Dales	Draw	12 (2-3-0)	12 (2-3-0)	13 August 1910	Metters	1200
11	Western Suburbs Magpies	Won	38 (8-7-0)	8 (2-1-0)	20 August 1910	St Lukes	1500
12	South Sydney Rabbitohs	Won	8 (0-4-0)	3 (1-0-0)	27 August 1910	Agricultural	12000
13	Balmain Tigers	Won	39 (9-6-0)	2 (0-1-0)	3 September 1910	Agricultural	5000
14	Glebe Dirty Reds	Won	36 (8-6-0)	0 (0-0-0)	10 September 1910	Agricultural	1500

== Ladder ==
	Team	Pld	W	D	L	PF	PA	PD	Pts
1	Newtown	14	11	1	2	262	92	+170	23
2	South Sydney	14	11	0	3	326	109	+217	22
3	Eastern Suburbs	14	9	2	3	248	116	+132	20
4	Balmain	14	8	0	6	153	190	-37	16
5	Glebe	14	6	0	8	175	194	-19	12
6	Annandale	14	5	1	8	145	200	-55	11
7	North Sydney	14	3	0	11	146	283	-137	6
8	Western Suburbs	14	1	0	13	115	386	-271	2

== Point analysis ==
=== Offence ===
The lowdown:

Eastern Suburbs completed the following score options in the 1910 season:

- 48 tries
- 52 goals
- 0 field goals

The result:

Eastern Suburbs scored a total of 248 points in 1910.

The verdict:

- Eastern Suburbs try scoring ability improved by 22.9% on their previous season.
- Eastern Suburbs goal scoring ability improved by 38.4% on their previous season.
- Eastern Suburbs field goal kicking ability was maintained on their previous season.
- Eastern Suburbs overall point scoring ability improved 31% on their previous season.
- Eastern Suburbs total point score improved by 32.6% on their previous season.

=== Defence ===
The lowdown:

Eastern Suburbs conceded the following score options in the 1908 season:

- 22 tries
- 24 goals
- 1 field goals

The result:

Eastern Suburbs conceded a total of 116 points in the 1910 season.

The verdict:

- Eastern Suburbs try scoring defence improved by 42.1% on their previous season.
- Eastern Suburbs goal kicking defence dropped by 12.5% on their previous season.
- Eastern Suburbs field goal defence dropped by 100% on their previous season.
- Eastern Suburbs overall defence improved by 20.3% on their previous season.
- Eastern Suburbs total points against defensive effort improved by 17.7% on their previous season.

== Season summary ==
- Eastern Suburbs finished the 1910 season in 3rd (of 8) position.
- For the third consecutive season Eastern Suburbs won the reserve grade competition.
- Dally Messenger was the top point scorer in the New South Wales Rugby League with 71 points.
- Dally Messenger was the only Eastern Suburbs player to be selected to represent Australia in 1910.

== Notes ==
1. The semi-final format had been changed for the 1910 season, and saw only the leading two sides play-off for that year's premiership.
2. Dan Frawley, previously contracted to the Warrington club, made a guest appearance for England in their tour match against Newcastle.

Preceded by 1909	Season; 1910	Succeeded by 1911
