= Bob Tidyman =

Australian rugby league footballer and soldier

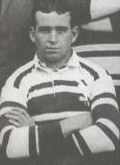

Personal information
- Full name: Robert Richardson Tidyman
- Born: 6 October 1891 Queensland, Australia
- Died: 15 November 1916 (aged 25) Flers, France

Playing information
- Position: Wing, Centre
Club
| Years | Team | Pld | T | G | FG | P |
|---|---|---|---|---|---|---|
| 1913–15 | Eastern Suburbs | 36 | 7 | 0 | 0 | 21 |
Representative
| Years | Team | Pld | T | G | FG | P |
| 1914 | New South Wales | 1 | 0 | 0 | 0 | 0 |
| 1914 | Australia | 2 | 0 | 0 | 0 | 0 |
| 1915 | Metropolis | 2 | 0 | 0 | 0 | 0 |
- Source: As of 1 May 2020

Bob Tidyman (1891–1916) was an Australian rugby league player and soldier who fell in World War I. A national representative winger, his short club career was played with Sydney's Eastern Suburbs club in the years 1912–15. In 1912 he played Second Grade then 1913 to 1915 First Grade.

== Rugby league career ==
A Queenslander by birth, Tidyman debuted for Eastern Suburbs in 1913 joining a star-studded line-up that included Dally Messenger, Wally Messenger, Sandy Pearce, Larry O'Malley, Les Cubitt, Dan Frawley and Arthur "Pony" Halloway who had already posted two premiership victories on the trot in 1911 and 1912. The 1913 Tricolours were minor-premiers after fourteen regular rounds and thus claimed the overall premiership and in the process permanent possession of the Royal Agricultural Society Shield having now won three successive premierships. Tidyman also played in the Eastern Suburbs sides who won the City Cup (a post-season tournament) in 1914 and 1915.

He made his representative debut for New South Wales in 1914 and that same year played in two Test matches for Australia against the touring English side including the famous Rorke's Drift Test at the Sydney Cricket Ground on 4 July 1914 where England, reduced to ten men, held on to defeat Australia 14–6. He is listed on the Australian Players Register as Kangaroo No. 94.

Prior to war service, he appeared in an Australian film In the Last Stride (1916).

== War service ==
Bob Tidyman was the only one of his team to enlist. He joined the AIF on 6 December 1915, and left Sydney on board HMAT A71 Nestor on 9 April 1916 as a member of the 11th Reinforcements for the 19th Battalion, 5th Brigade, 2nd Division.

Tidyman joined the 19th Battalion on France's Western Front on 25 September 1916. The battalion had taken part in the battles at Pozières in July and August and had suffered terrible casualties.

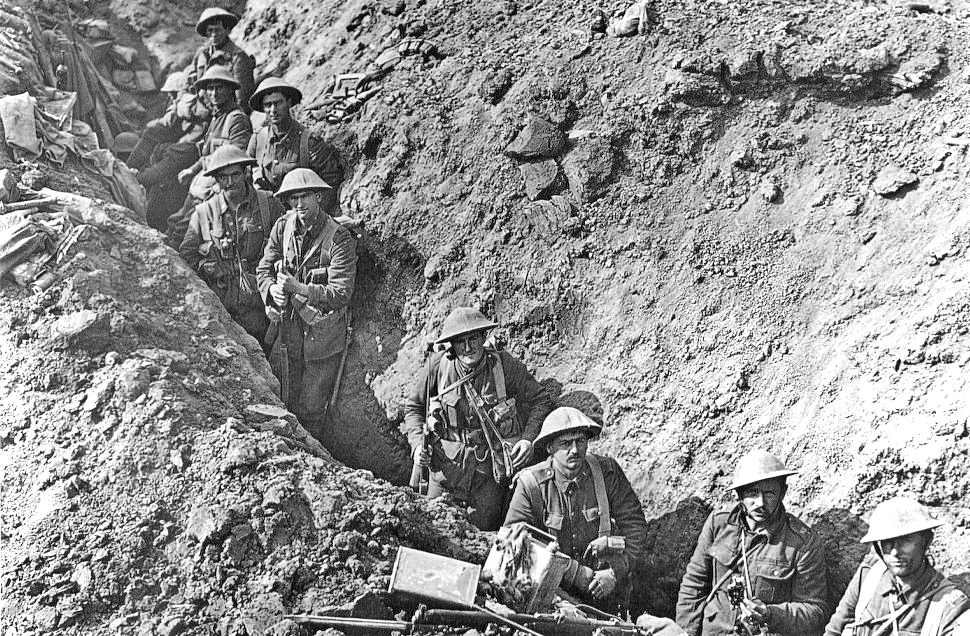
Trenches near Flers, in September 1916.

The 19th Battalion was attacking at Flers, Somme in the last action of the Somme Offensive of 1916 before winter set in when Tidyman was listed as missing in action on 14 November 1916. A report said: "We gained our objective and took two lines of trenches. We made 50 prisoners. Tidyman was told to look after these prisoners but I think he was sniped taking them down."

His body was not recovered for burial and his name is listed on the Australian Memorial at Villers Bretonneux, along with 11,000 other Australians who fell in France and have no known grave.

Tidyman had two brothers in France – William and Christopher Tidyman who both served with the 55th and 17th Battalions. Both were wounded but survived the war.

Roll of Honour at the AWM, Villers-Bret

== Honours and awards ==

- British War Medal
- Victory Medal
