= Gowenlock =

Gowenlock is a surname. Notable people with the surname include:

- Alice Gowenlock (1878–1957), English badminton player
- Ernest Gowenlock (1890–1918), Australian rugby league footballer
