= 1913 NSWRFL season =

Rugby league competition

- League: New South Wales Rugby Football League
- Duration: 3 May to 16 August
- Teams: 8
- Matches played: 56
- Points scored: 1344
- Premiers: Eastern Suburbs (3rd title)
- Minor Premiers: Eastern Suburbs (2nd title)
- Wooden spoon: Western Suburbs (4th spoon)
- Top point-scorer(s): Harold Horder (65)
- Top try-scorer(s): Harold Horder (13)

Second Grade
- Number of teams: 14
- Premiers: South Sydney
- Runners-up: Grosvenor

Third Grade
- Number of teams: 21 (1 withdrew)
- Premiers: South Sydney Federals
- Runners-up: South Sydney Kinkora

The 1913 New South Wales Rugby Football League premiership was the sixth season of Sydney's top-level rugby league club competition, Australia's first. Eight teams from across the city contested during the season.

== Season summary ==
By the start of the 1913 season, the NSWRFL had secured the use of the Sydney Cricket Ground for its games.

As occurred in the 1912 season, the minor premiers were deemed the overall premiers. Eastern Suburbs, who finished top of the table for the second time in as many years, claimed their third straight premiership as a result. The team's success could be attributed to the talent in the team at the time, with ten players having played for Australia and another three for New South Wales. Of the team's two losses, one came at the hands of runners-up Newtown midway through the season and the other in the final round to Glebe after the title had already been won.

This Eastern Suburbs side is still considered to be one of the greatest club teams ever assembled, with players including Dally Messenger, Wally Messenger, Sandy Pearce, Larry O'Malley, Les Cubitt, Dan Frawley and Arthur "Pony" Halloway. This season also saw the retirement from the League of future Australian Rugby League Hall of Fame inductee, Dally Messenger.

=== Teams ===
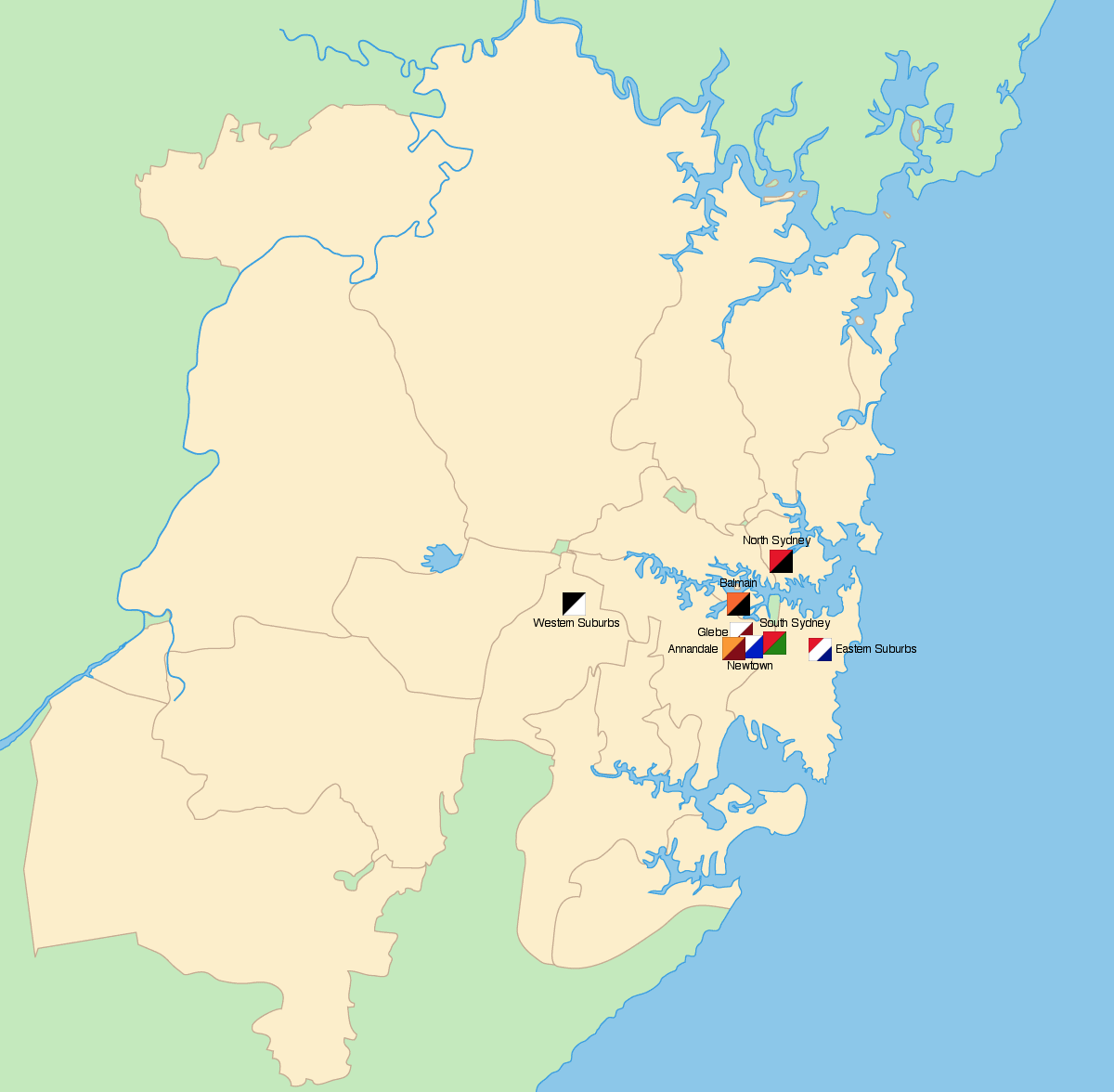
The geographical locations of the teams that contested the 1913 premiership across Sydney.

The teams remained unchanged from the previous season.

- Annandale
- Balmain, formed on 23 January 1908 at Balmain Town Hall
- Eastern Suburbs, formed on 24 January 1908 at Paddington Town Hall
- Glebe, formed on 9 January 1908
- Newtown, formed on 14 January 1908
- North Sydney, formed on February 7, 1908, at the North Sydney School of Arts in Mount Street
- South Sydney, formed on 17 January 1908 at Redfern Town Hall
- Western Suburbs, formed on 4 February 1908

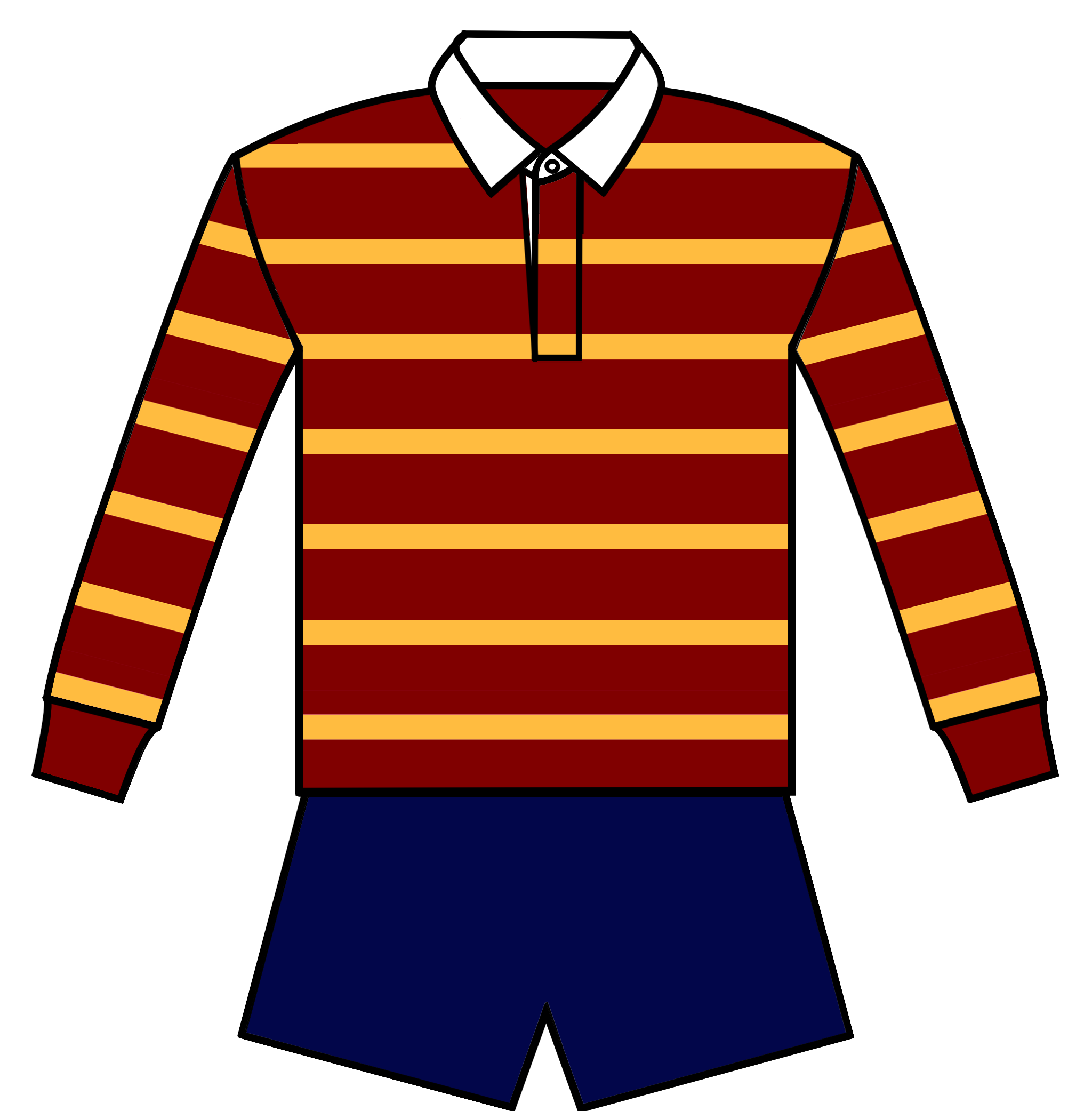
Annandale; 4th season Ground: Wentworth Park; Captain-Coach: Paddy McCue

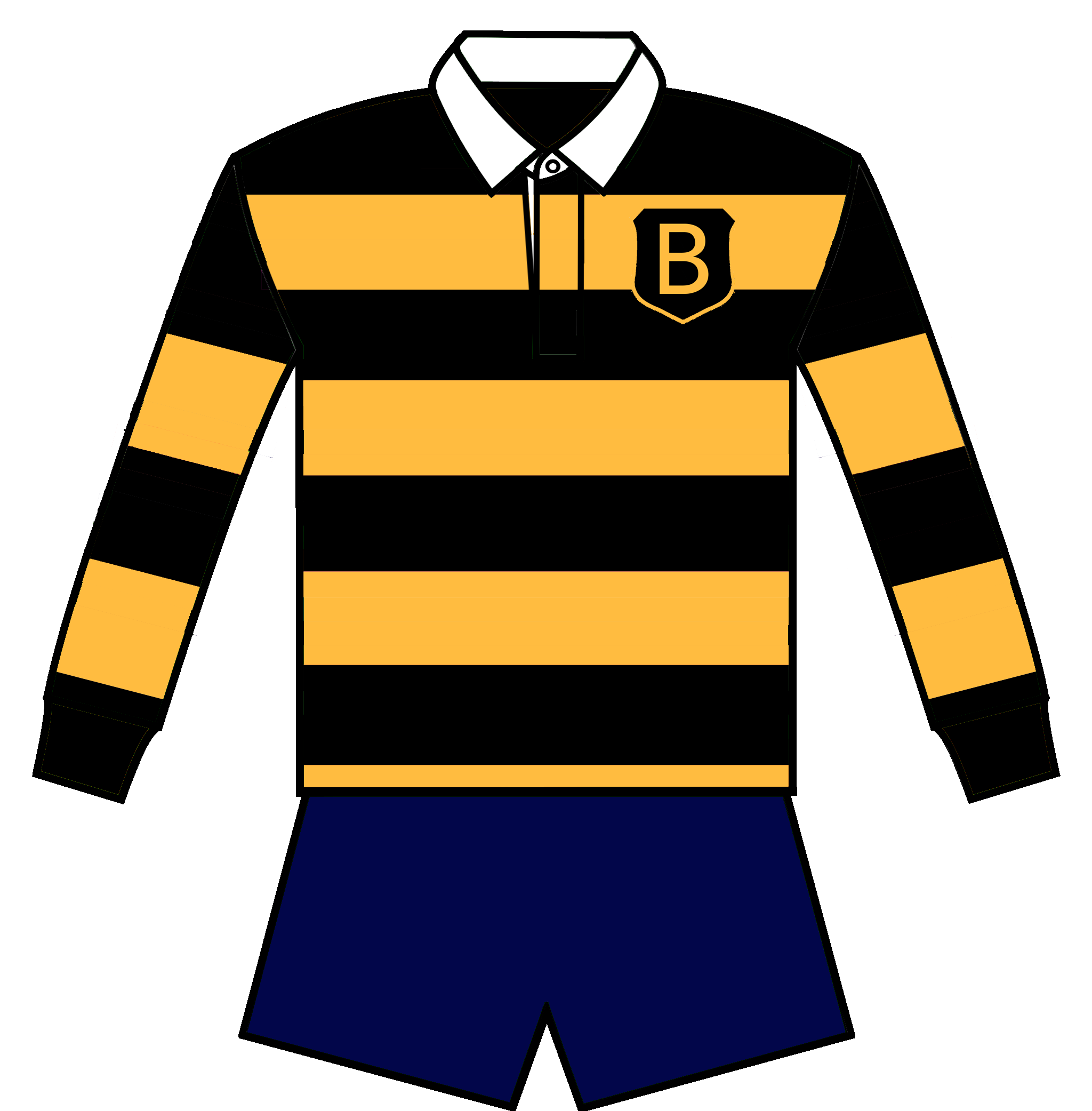
Balmain; 6th season Ground: Birchgrove Oval; Coach: Robert Graves; Captain: Bill Noble

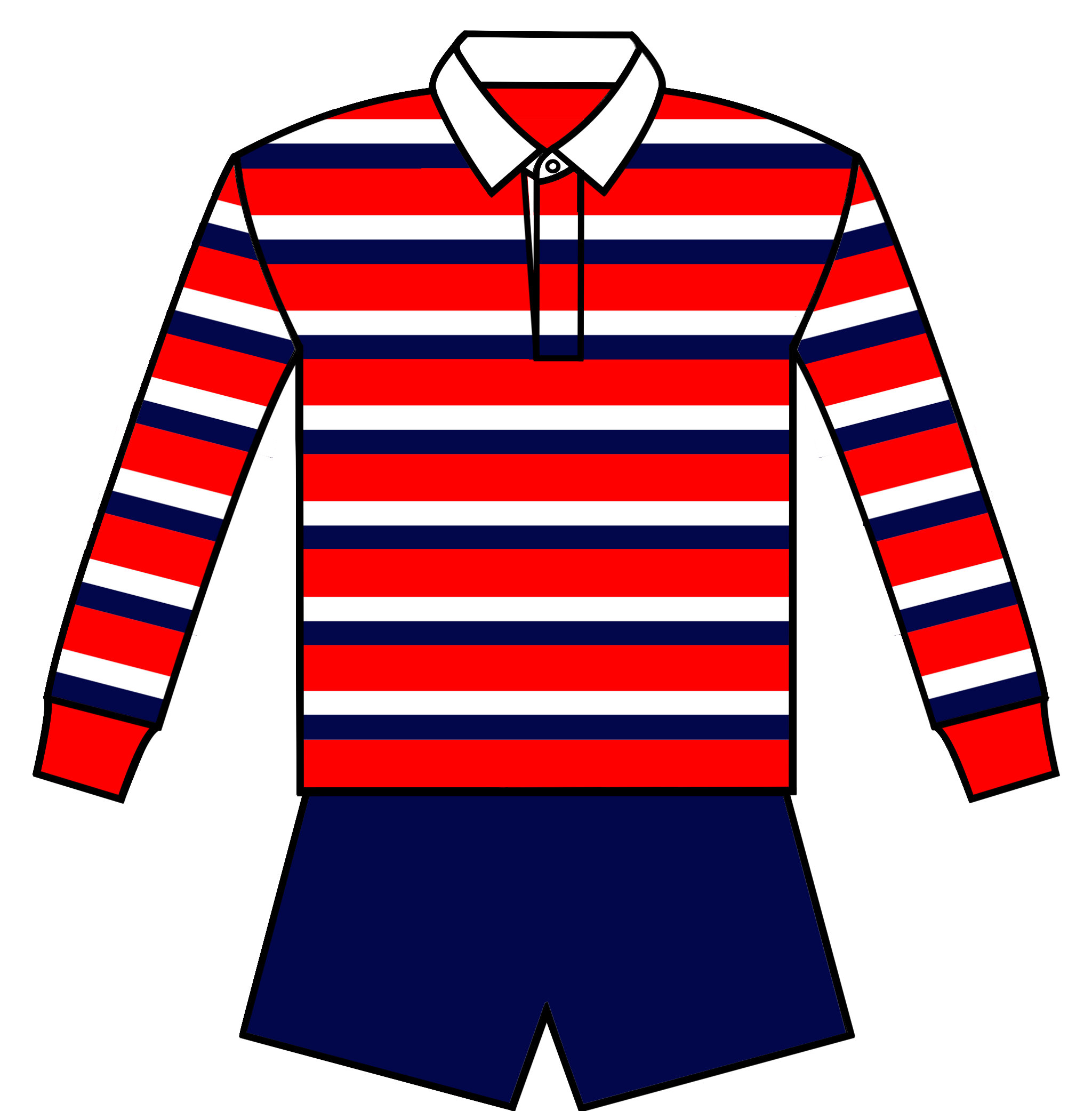
Eastern Suburbs; 6th season Ground: Sydney Sports Ground; Captain-Coach: Dally Messenger

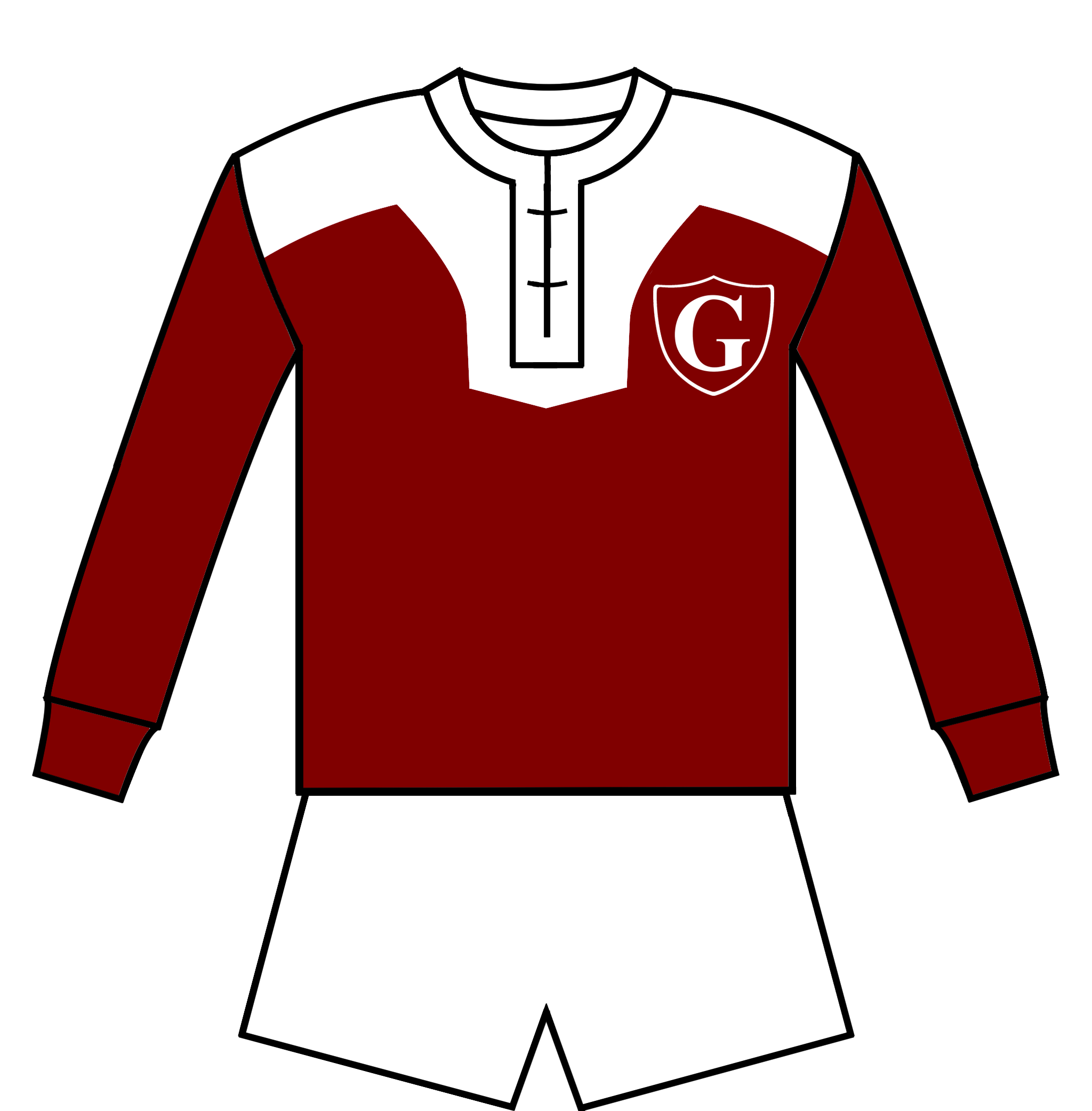
Glebe; 6th season Ground: Wentworth Park; Captain-Coach: Chris McKivat

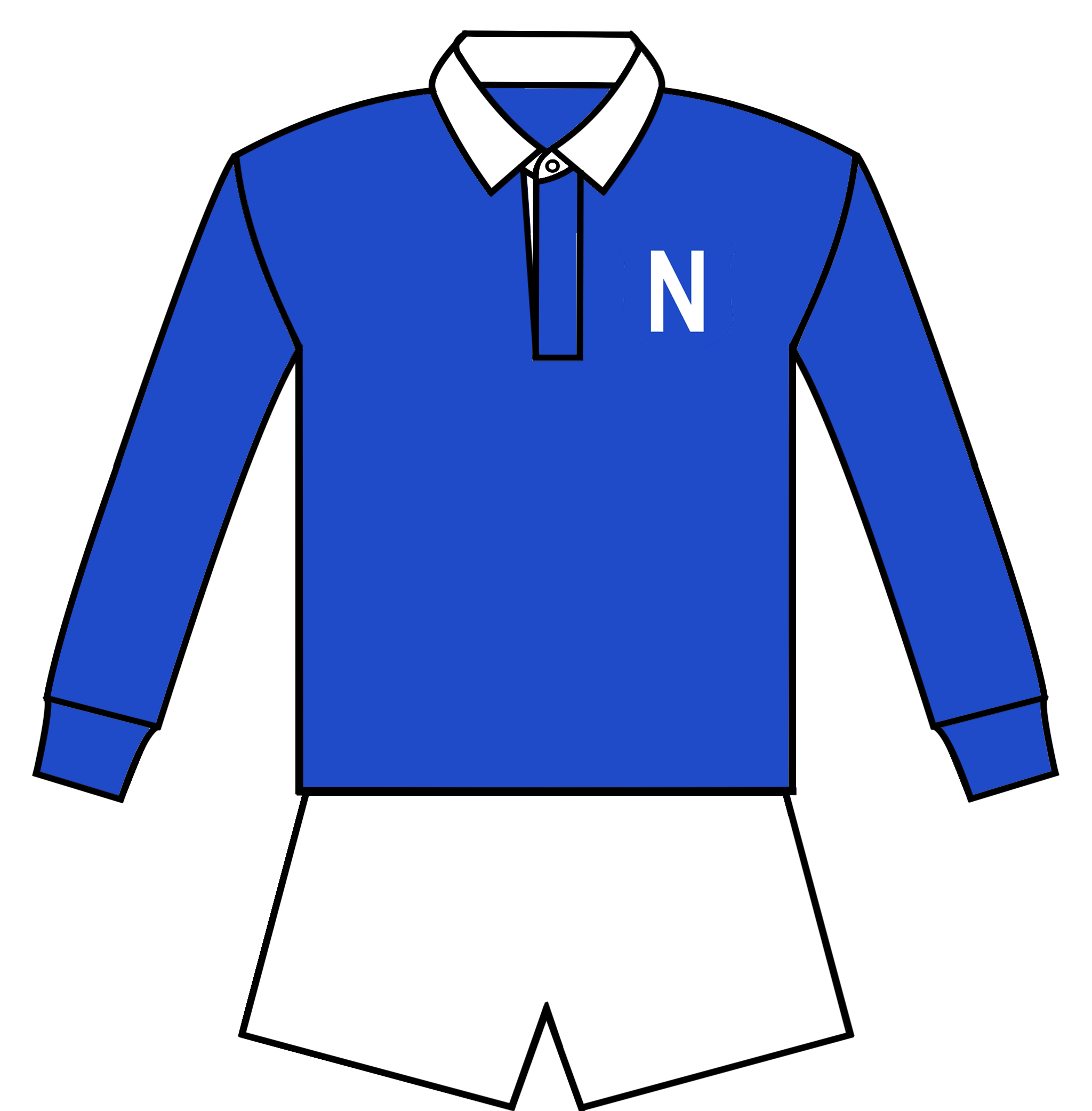
Newtown; 6th season Ground: Erskineville Oval; Captain-Coach: Charles "Boxer" Russell

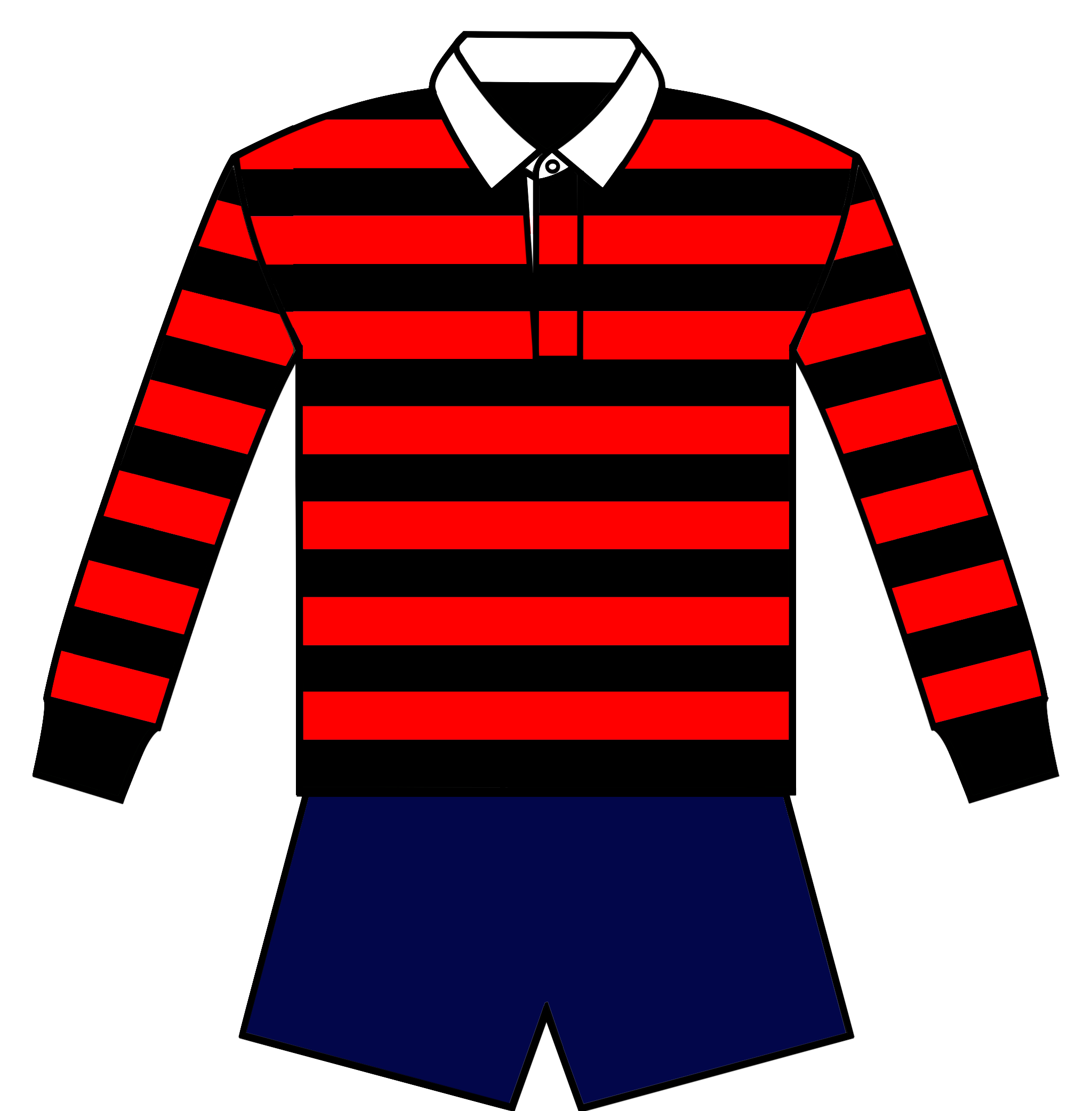
North Sydney; 6th season Ground: North Sydney Oval; Coach: Captain: Sid Deane & Jim Devereux

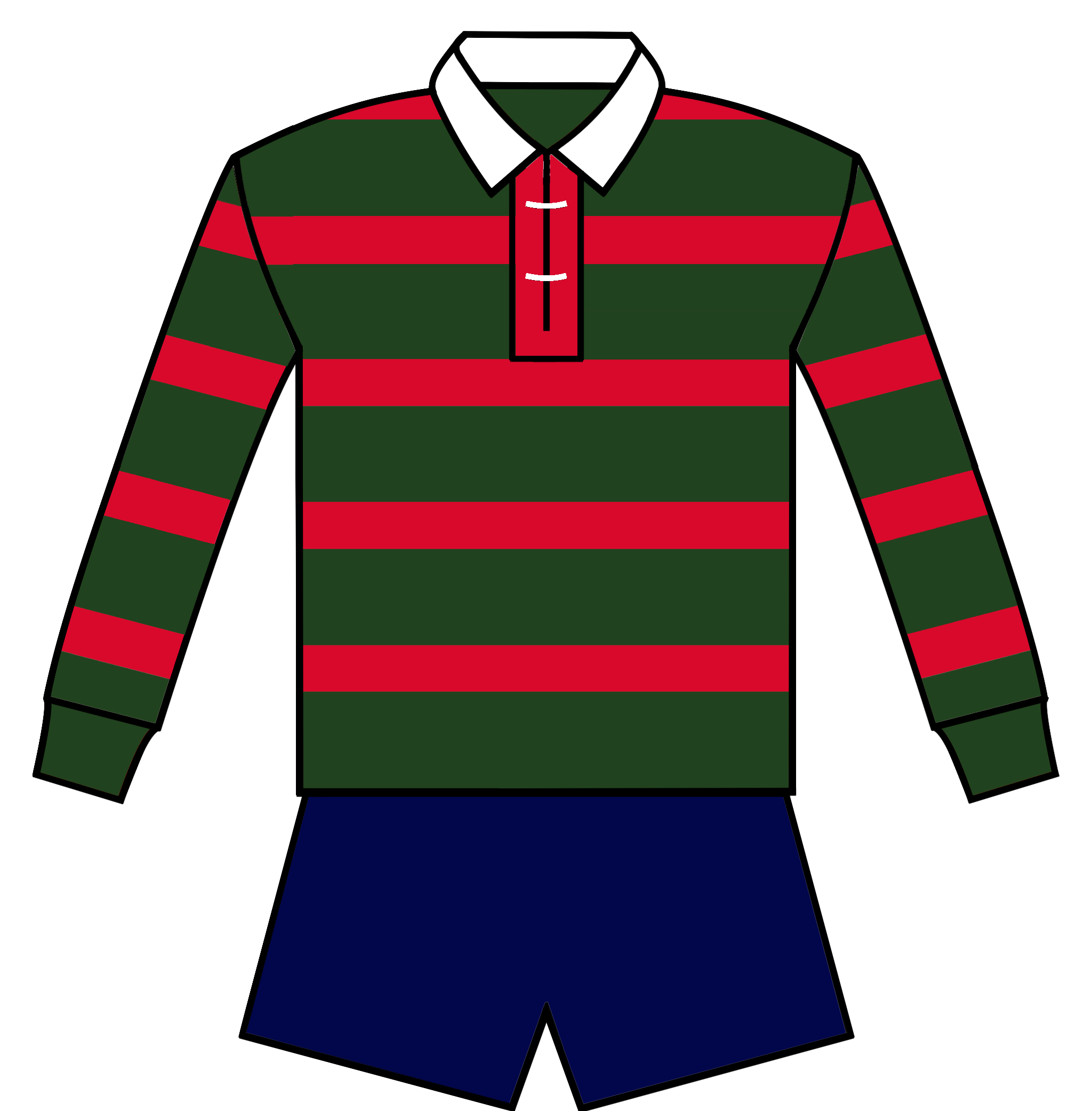
South Sydney; 6th season Ground: Sydney Sports Ground; Coach: John Rosewell; Captain: Arthur Butler

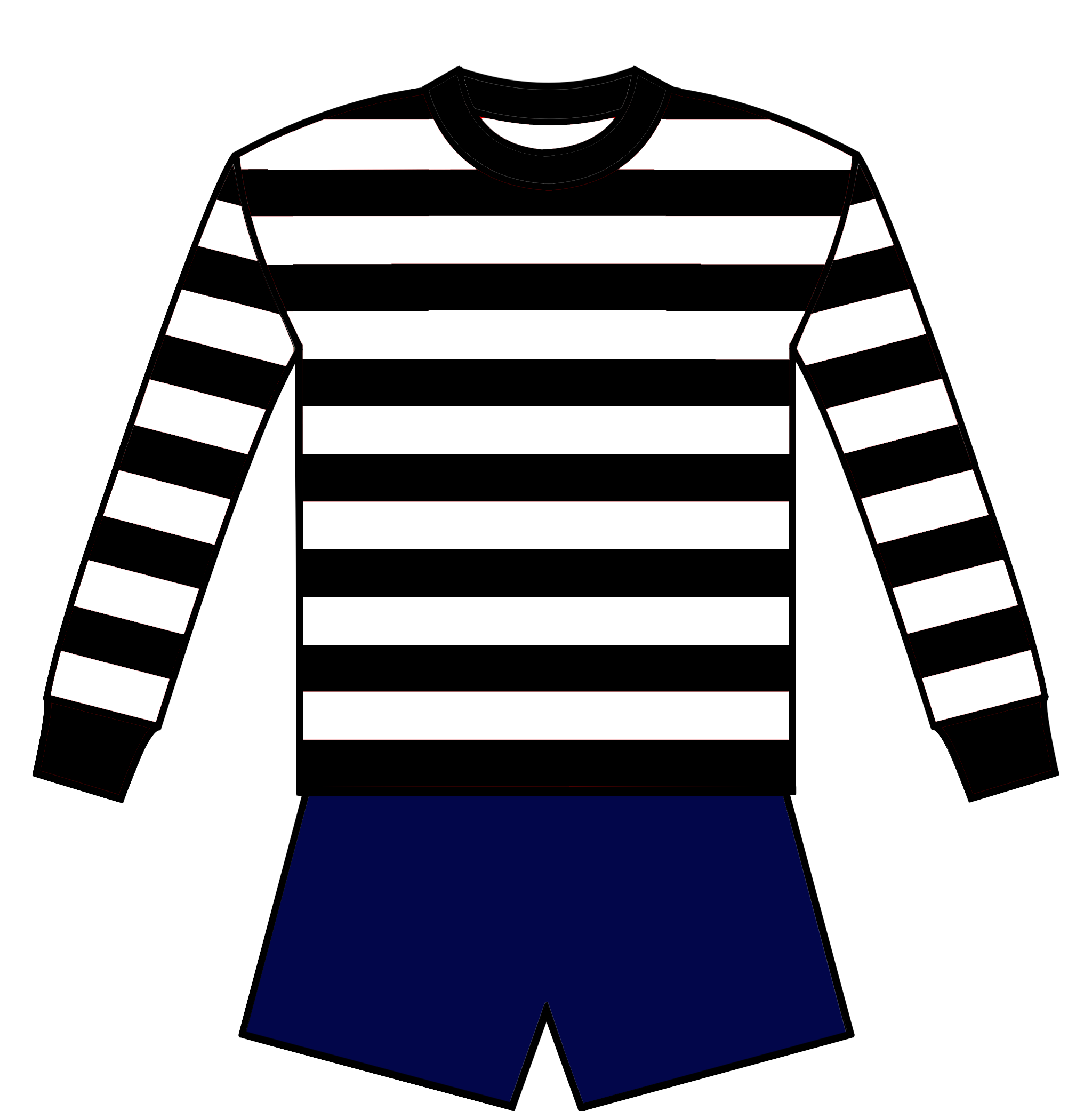
Western Suburbs; 6th season Ground: Pratten Park; Captain-Coach: Tedda Courtney, Jim Abercrombie

=== Ladder ===
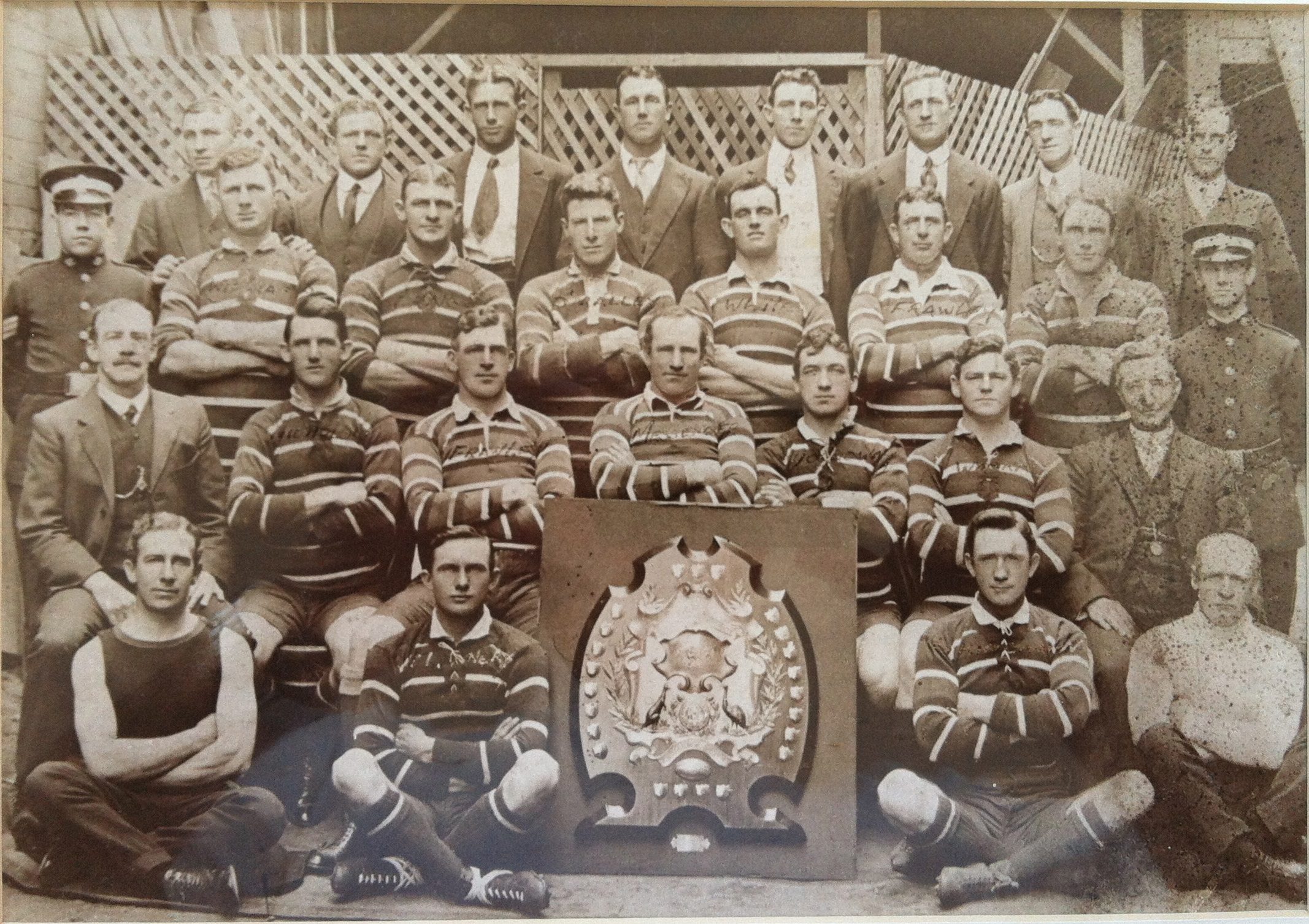
The 1913 Eastern Suburbs DRLFC's premiership winning team with the Royal Agricultural Society Shield.

	Team	Pld	W	D	L	PF	PA	PD	Pts
1	Eastern Suburbs	14	12	0	2	227	118	+109	24
2	Newtown	14	10	1	3	203	135	+68	21
3	South Sydney	14	9	0	5	200	132	+68	18
4	Glebe	14	8	0	6	198	161	+37	16
5	North Sydney	14	5	2	7	199	193	+6	12
6	Balmain	14	4	1	9	83	135	-52	9
7	Annandale	14	3	0	11	119	219	-100	6
8	Western Suburbs	14	3	0	11	115	251	-136	6

=== Records set in 1913 ===
On 19 July, South Sydney's reserve grade team scored 102 points against Mosman, which remains the greatest number of points scored in any grade of NSWRFL/NSWRL/ARL/NRL rugby league. The Rabbitohs scored 49 points in the first half and 59 in the second, conceding only a solitary penalty goal.
