= Ernest Gowenlock =

Australian rugby league footballer and soldier

Ernest Stanley Gowenlock (1890–1918), was a rugby league footballer in the New South Wales Rugby League - the major rugby league competition in Australia.

Ernie Gowenlock played for the Eastern Suburbs club in 1913, that season Easts' won the premiership - their third. A winger, Gowenlock is recognised as the 'Tricolours' 68th player.

== War service ==
Gowenlock joined World War I with the 57th Battalion in France and died of wounds inflicted at Gueudecourt on 10 April 1918 aged 28.
