= Bob Williams (rugby) =

Australian rugby union footballer, and rugby league footballer and coach

Personal information
- Full name: Robert Williams
- Born: 22 December 1886; Sydney, New South Wales
- Died: 27 April 1969 (aged 82); Balmain, New South Wales

Playing information
- Position: Second-row, Prop
Club
Years	Team	Pld	T	G	FG	P
1910–20	Eastern Suburbs	131	8	0	0	24
Representative
Years	Team	Pld	T	G	FG	P
1911–14	New South Wales	8	2	0	0	6
1911–12	Australia	2	0	0	0	0
1910–14	Metropolis	5	0	0	0	0

Coaching information
Club
Years	Team	Gms	W	D	L	W%
1935–37	University	38	1	1	37	3
1938–39	North Sydney	26	8	2	18	31
	Total	64	9	3	55	14

Robert Williams (1886–1969) was a pioneer Australian rugby league footballer for the Eastern Suburbs club.

== Playing career ==
Williams, a dock worker from Woolloomooloo, had a distinguished career with the Eastern Suburbs club. He was a long serving member who was one of the first to play in 100 matches for the club. The rugby union convert played in 118 matches for the Tri-colours in ten seasons over the years 1910–18 and 1920.

Williams, or 'Botsy' as he was better known, won premierships with Eastern Suburbs in 1911, 1912 and 1913, taking out rugby league's first permanent trophy - the RAS shield.

He was also a member of Eastern Suburbs City Cup winning sides in 1914, 1915 & 1916.

== Representative career ==
A lightweight but rugged front-row forward went away on the second Kangaroo tour representing his country in two Tests and appearing in seventeen other tour matches. He is listed on the Australian Players Register as Kangaroo No. 85. Williams was a member of the first New South Wales side to tour New Zealand in 1912.

== Coaching career ==
He coached the Brisbane University Rugby league team between 1924 and 1926. He was also a coach of Brisbane's West End RLFC in the 1932–1934.

Williams returned to Sydney, coaching University in 1935, 1936 and 1937, North Sydney in 1938 & 1939 and Queensland in the 1939 interstate series.

The Sydney Roosters player register lists him as number 45.

Bob Williams died in 1969 aged 82.

Sporting positions
Preceded by Laurie Ward; 1937	Coach North Sydney; 1938–1939	Succeeded by Arthur Halloway; 1940–1941
