= Francis Male =

Australian rugby league footballer

Personal information
- Full name: Francis Male

Playing information
- Position: Halfback
Club
Years	Team	Pld	T	G	FG	P
1916–17	Eastern Suburbs	21	0	0	0	0

Francis Male was a rugby league footballer who played in the New South Wales Rugby League(NSWRL). Male played with Eastern Suburbs in the 1916–17 seasons.
