= Jim Duffy (rugby league) =

Australian rugby league footballer

Personal information
- Full name: Jim Duffy

Playing information
- Position: Second-row, Prop
Club
Years	Team	Pld	T	G	FG	P
1915–20	Eastern Suburbs	77	16	0	0	48

Jim Duffy was a rugby league footballer who played in the New South Wales Rugby League (NWSWRL) for Eastern Suburbs.

Duffy, A forward, played six seasons with Eastern Suburbs club between 1915 and 1920.
