= George Challis (rugby league) =

Australian rugby league footballer

Personal information
- Full name: George Melrose Challis
- Born: 19 September 1889 Hay, New South Wales, Australia
- Died: 17 October 1965 (aged 76) Newcastle, New South Wales, Australia

Playing information
- Position: Fullback, Halfback
Club
Years	Team	Pld	T	G	FG	P
1912–13	Annandale	25	0	0	0	0
1914–16	Eastern Suburbs	40	2	0	1	8
1917	Annandale	13	0	9	0	18
1918	Balmain	10	0	0	0	0
1920	Eastern Suburbs	1	0	0	0	0
	Total	89	2	9	1	26
Representative
Years	Team	Pld	T	G	FG	P
1913–15	New South Wales	5	0	0	0	0
- Source: As of 14 February 2019

George Challis (1889–1965) was an Australian rugby league footballer who played for the Annandale, Eastern Suburbs and Balmain clubs in the New South Wales Rugby League (NSWRL) competition.

== Playing career ==
Challis played for the Eastern Suburbs club in the years (1914–1916) and (1920). A fullback, Challis was a member of the Eastern Suburbs sides that won City Cups in 1914, '15 and 1916. Challis joined the Balmain club at the end of the 1916 season only to return to the club for 1 final season in 1920.

Challis is recognised as being the 72nd player to wear the red, white and blue of the Eastern Suburbs club. In Challis's 4 seasons at the club he scored 6 tries, and 1 goal for a total of 20 points.

In 1913, Challis was a member of the first NSW representative side to tour New Zealand. In the 1915 season Challis was again selected to represent NSW in 2 interstate matches against Queensland.
