= Abraham Jonas (rugby league) =

Australian rugby league footballer

Abraham Jonas (1890 – 8 January 1933) was a rugby league footballer in the Australian competition – the New South Wales Rugby League (NSWRL).

Jonas played for the Eastern Suburbs club in the seasons 1915–16. He is listed on the Sydney Roosters Player Register as player No. 85.

He died at Dee Why Beach after suffering a heart attack, age 41, on 8 January 1933.
