= Dan Flannery =

Australian rugby league footballer

Personal information
- Full name: Daniel Flannery
- Born: 11 November 1891 Sydney, New South Wales, Australia
- Died: 12 November 1967 (aged 76)

Playing information
- Position: Centre, Wing, Fullback
Club
Years	Team	Pld	T	G	FG	P
1913–18	Eastern Suburbs	53	3	1	2	15
Representative
Years	Team	Pld	T	G	FG	P
1914	Metropolis	1	1	0	0	3
- Source: As of 21 June 2019

Dan Flannery was an Australian professional rugby league footballer who played in the 1910s. He played for Eastern Suburbs in the New South Wales Rugby League (NSWRL) competition.

== Background ==
Flannery was born in Sydney, New South Wales, Australia.

== Playing career ==
Flannery made his first grade debut for Eastern Suburbs against Newtown in Round 1 1913 at the Sydney Cricket Ground. Flannery was a member of the Eastern Suburbs sides that won the 1913 premiership and City Cups in 1914 and 1915.
