= Barney Dalton =

Australian rugby league footballer (1891-1929)

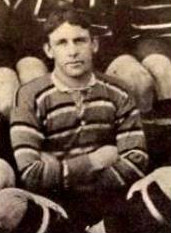
- Dalton in 1911

Personal information
- Full name: Bernard Hugh Dalton
- Born: 23 July 1891 Sydney, New South Wales
- Died: 9 September 1929 (aged 38) East Sydney, New South Wales

Playing information
- Position: Wing
Club
Years	Team	Pld	T	G	FG	P
1910–15	Eastern Suburbs	61	16	0	0	48
- Source: Whiticker/Hudson
- Relatives: William Dalton (brother)

Bernard Hugh Dalton (1891 – 9 November 1929) was an Australian pioneer rugby league player in the Australian competition – the New South Wales Rugby League. He was born in 1891 in Sydney.

== Rugby league career ==
A winger, Barney Dalton played for the Eastern Suburbs club side in the years (1910–12) and (1914–15) as a Winger. He was a member of Eastern Suburbs first premiership winning side that defeated Glebe in the final of the competition in 1911, and backed up the following season in 1912 as Easts took their second title.

The winger was also a member of the Easts' sides that won City Cups in 1914 and 1915. Dalton is recognised as the 43rd player to join the Eastern Suburbs club, playing 61 first grade games and scoring 16 tries.

His brother William Dalton also played with him at Eastern Suburbs.

== Criminal career ==
Barney Dalton became a gangland figure, and was reportedly mixed up with some of Sydney's most dangerous criminals in the 1920s. He was a member of Kate Leigh's razor gang during the Sydney gang wars that also involved Tilly Devine and Phil Jeffs.

== Death ==
Dalton was shot dead outside the Strand Hotel, on the corner of Crown Street and William Street, East Sydney on 9 November 1929 by notorious criminal Frank Green. He was 38 years of age.

His funeral was held at St Mary's Cathedral on 12 November 1929, and attended by 200 mourners. He was buried at Botany Catholic Cemetery, now known as Eastern Suburbs Memorial Park.

== In popular culture ==
Rick Donald played Barney Dalton in the 2011 Channel 9 television series Underbelly: Razor, based on the 1920-30s razor gang wars in Sydney.
