= Claude Nicholson (rugby league) =

Australian rugby league footballer

Personal information
- Full name: Claude Hubert Nicholson
- Born: 1892
- Died: 12 March 1951; Concord, New South Wales

Playing information
- Position: Second-row, Lock
Club
Years	Team	Pld	T	G	FG	P
1913–15	Eastern Suburbs	14	7	0	0	21

Claude Hubert "Tod" Nicholson (1892-1951) was a rugby league footballer in the New South Wales Rugby League (NSWRL) Competition.

== Playing career ==
Nicholson, known as Tod, played for the Eastern Suburbs side in the 1913 season, the year the club won its third successive premiership. He is recognised as the 'Tricolours' 69th player. In 1914 he enlisted in the armed services and serviced with the 14th field ambulance corp at 2 AGH (Australian ground hospital) Boulogne, France.

== Death ==
Nicholson died at the Concord Repatriation General Hospital on the 12 March 1951.
