= Percy White (rugby league) =

Australian rugby league footballer

Personal information
- Full name: Percy Rowett White
- Born: 16 August 1887 Paddington, Sydney, Australia
- Died: 24 April 1918 (aged 30) Villers-Bretonneux, France

Playing information
- Position: Prop
Club
Years	Team	Pld	T	G	FG	P
1908–16	Eastern Suburbs	89	10	1	0	32
- Source: Whiticker As of 17 January 2012
- Relatives: Eddie White (brother)

Percy Rowett White (1887–1918) was an Australian pioneer rugby league footballer. He played in the New South Wales Rugby League competition at the time of the code's Australian foundation in 1908, and won a premiership with Sydney's Eastern Suburbs club in 1912. He later served in World War I, and was killed by artillery fire in France in 1918.

== Rugby League career ==
Born in the inner-city Sydney suburb of Paddington, White played 89 matches for the Eastern Suburbs club between 1908 and 1916. He played as a prop forward in East's 14–12 loss to South Sydney in rugby league's first premiership decider in season 1908. He was a squad member of the Easts sides who won premierships in 1911, 1912 and 1913, as well as the City Cup-winning sides of 1914, 1915 and 1916. White is recognised as Eastern Suburbs' 23rd player; his teammate Eddie White was his brother, while his father, John White, was one of the club's earliest presidents.

== War service and death ==
White was one of many Australians to serve on the Western Front during the World War I. He was a driver with the 29th Company Australian Army Service Corps, whose base was in the Belgian town of Loker. He was aged 30 when he was hit by an artillery shell at an unknown location in 1918. He died of his wounds on 24 April 1918 at Villers-Bretonneux in northern France.

The following article appeared in the Sydney Morning Herald under the heading of "War Casualties" on 8 May 1918:

Mr. John White, of Trelawny, Gurner St, Paddington, has received cable advice from his son, Lieut. E. C. White, advising the death in action of his youngest son, Percy Rowett White. Driver White was a member of the Master Builders' Association, of Sydney, and was a representative League footballer, having been a member of the Eastern Suburbs team since its foundation.

White is buried at Daours Communal Cemetery Extension in France. His name is commemorated on panel 181 in the Australian War Memorial.

== Bibliography ==
- Cashman, Richard (1997). Australian Sport Through Time – The History of Sport in Australia. Australia Random House. ISBN 978-0-09-183378-7.
- Whiticker, Alan and Hudson, Glen (2006). The Encyclopedia of Rugby League Players. Sydney: Gavin Allen Publishing.
