= Larry O'Malley =

Australian rugby league footballer

Personal information
- Full name: Lawrence O'Malley
- Born: 23 April 1883 Ireland
- Died: 31 July 1967 (aged 84) Paddington, New South Wales

Playing information

Rugby union
- Position: Forward
Club
Years	Team	Pld	T	G	FG	P
	East Borough Rugby Club
1906–07	Sydney Rugby Union Club
	Total	0	0	0	0	0

Rugby league
- Position: Second-row
Club
Years	Team	Pld	T	G	FG	P
1908–14	Eastern Suburbs	62				42
1909–10	Warrington RLFC	36	7			21
1911–14	Eastern Suburbs
	Total	98	7	0	0	63
Representative
Years	Team	Pld	T	G	FG	P
1908–13	New South Wales	9	2	0	0	6
1908–09	Australia	5	0	0	0	0

Larry 'Jersey' O'Malley (1883–1967) was a pioneer Australian rugby league player for the Eastern Suburbs club. He was the fifth Australian rugby league captain and the second from the Eastern Suburbs club.

== Early life ==
Born in Ireland in 1883, he arrived in Australia with his parents and older brother the following year aboard the Selkirkshire as assisted immigrants. The family settled in Paddington, and Larry played rugby with the local juniors. He gained his nickname of 'Jersey' because of his red hair.

== Career ==
=== Rugby union ===
Before switching codes and joining the Eastern Suburbs club in rugby league's foundation year, 1908, O'Malley played rugby union firstly for the East Borough and then the Sydney Rugby Union Clubs in 1906-07.

=== Rugby league ===
Larry 'Jersey' O'Malley played with Eastern Suburbs for six seasons: 1908, 1909 and 1911–1914, and played over 50 first grade games. He had a reputation as a tough 'no nonsense' forward.

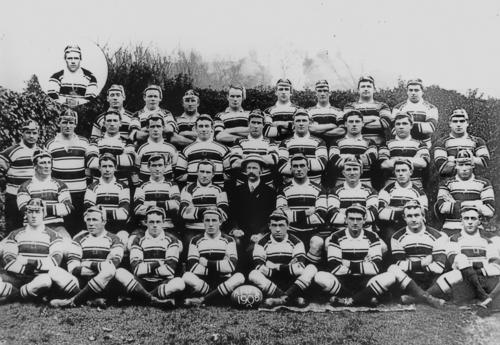
Jerse (3rd row seated far right) Pioneer Kangaroos 1908-09

During the 1908 Kangaroo Tour O'Malley signed with the English club, Warrington for the 1909–10 English season. He returned to Australia and enjoying successive premierships with the Eastern Suburbs club in 1911, 1912 and 1913. He was also a member of the Eastern Suburbs side that won the City Cup in 1914.

== Representative career ==
He made his representative début for New South Wales in rugby league's inaugural interstate match in 1908. Later that year he was selected for Australia's first Kangaroo Tour. He played in 34 matches, a record for the most matches played on a Kangaroo tour, including all three Tests and was sent off twice in matches on the tour. The following season he captained Australia in two Tests against New Zealand.

== Referee ==
O'Malley retired from playing the game at the end of the 1914 season but went on to become a first grade referee.

== Playing record ==
- Club: Eastern Suburbs 1908-09 and 1911–14) 62 games, 4 tries
- Representative: Australia (1908–09) 5 Tests, and New South Wales (1908–13) 9 appearances.

== Sources ==
- Whiticker, Alan (2004) Captaining the Kangaroos, New Holland, Sydney

Sporting positions
Preceded by Dally Messenger	Captain Australia; 1909	Succeeded by Robert Graves
