= Arthur Halloway =

Australian rugby league footballer and coach

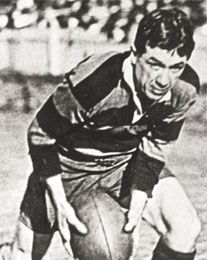
- Halloway playing for the Balmain Tigers

Personal information
- Full name: Arthur James Halloway
- Born: 17 July 1885 Sydney, Australia
- Died: 29 January 1961 (aged 75) Burwood, New South Wales

Playing information
- Height: 165 cm (5 ft 5 in)
- Weight: 63.5 kg (140 lb; 10 st 0 lb)
- Position: Halfback
Club
Years	Team	Pld	T	G	FG	P
1908	Glebe	8	2	0	0	6
1909–11	Balmain	30	18	0	0	54
1912–14	Eastern Suburbs	36	9	0	0	27
1915–20	Balmain	78	28	1	0	86
1921–2?	? (Queensland)
	Total	152	57	1	0	173
Representative
Years	Team	Pld	T	G	FG	P
1907–19	New South Wales	27	7	0	0	21
1921	Queensland	1	0	0	0	0
1908–19	Australia	10	0	0	0	0

Coaching information
Club
Years	Team	Gms	W	D	L	W%
1916–20	Balmain	75	57	3	15	76
1923	Newtown	16	4	2	10	25
1930–31	Eastern Suburbs	31	23	0	8	74
1933–38	Eastern Suburbs	89	64	8	17	72
1940–41	North Sydney	28	7	1	20	25
1945	Eastern Suburbs	16	13	0	3	81
1947	Eastern Suburbs	18	5	1	12	28
1948	Canterbury-Bankstown	18	7	2	9	39
	Total	291	180	17	94	62

Arthur 'Pony' Halloway (1885–1961), was a pioneering Australian rugby league footballer and coach. Born in Sydney, New South Wales he played for the Glebe Dirty Reds (1908), Balmain Tigers (1909–1911 and 1915–1920) and Eastern Suburbs (1912–1914), in the New South Wales Rugby Football League premiership. He played for New South Wales in the first rugby match run by the newly created 'New South Wales Rugby Football League' which had just split away from the established New South Wales Rugby Football Union.

He was a half-back for the Australian national team. He played in ten Tests between 1908 and 1919, as captain on three occasions in 1919. Halloway was nicknamed 'Pony', but despite his small stature he was recognised as one of the fiercest competitors to play the game and one of the nation's finest footballers of the 20th century. Halloway holds the record for the most premierships won as a coach in Australian rugby league history with eight premierships. Halloway also holds the record for the longest undefeated streak as a coach in Australian rugby league history with 35 games undefeated.

== Playing career ==
Arthur was playing rugby union with Easts in Sydney when the defections to rugby league commenced in 1908. He was recruited by the Glebe club after taking part in the rebel series against Baskerville's New Zealand 'All Golds'. Late in the 1908 season Halloway was selected to go away on the inaugural Kangaroo Tour . He played in 29 matches on tour including the 1st Anglo-Australian Test in London.

Earlier that year Halloway made his Test debut in Australia's 14–9 win in the 3rd Test in Sydney in 1908, the third international league fixture in which Australia took part.

The arrival of the second wave of Wallaby defectors in 1909 pushed Halloway down the representative pecking order and for the next five years he maintained a regular rivalry for the Australian half-back position with former Wallaby captain Chris McKivat.

In 1910 Halloway moved to the Balmain club for three seasons, from where he also continued his representative career, making his second Kangaroo tour in 1911. He played in twelve tour matches but no Tests with McKivat the preferred Test half-back.

He joined the Eastern Suburbs club 1912 where he won back to back premierships in 1912 and 1913 as well as being a member of the City Cup Winning Side in 1914.

Following Chris McKivat's retirement he became the preferred half back in the 1914 Ashes series.

Halloway returned to Balmain in 1915 where he won further premierships in 1915, 1916 (scoring his team's only try in the final), 1917, 1919 and 1920 as captain and captain-coach from 1916.

== Australian captain ==
His first appearance as captain of the Kangaroos was on the 1919 tour of New Zealand when he captained the side to a 2–1 tour victory. Throughout his playing career Halloway played in over 100 representative matches, including ten tests for Australia. He made over thirty appearances for New South Wales as well as one for Queensland after he moved there in 1921.

He was the only man to be part of all of Australia's first three tours – the first two Kangaroo tours and the 1919 trip to New Zealand. Along with Billy Cann, Dan Frawley and Tedda Courtney he was one of four men to make all three of the tours made between 1908 and 1912 by Australian or New South Welsh teams.

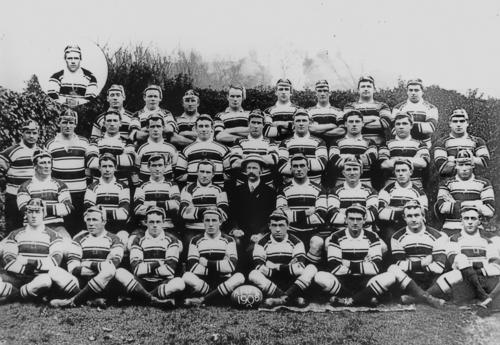
Pony (front, right of ball) with Pioneer Kangaroos 1908–09

. He is listed on the Australian Players Register as Kangaroo No. 21.

== Character and playing style ==
The story is recounted of him chopping off a finger in a work related accident one Saturday morning, then leading his club side, Balmain, to victory that afternoon with his hand swathed in a blood-stained bandage.

== Coaching career ==
After retirement as a player he coached in the country league at Parkes, then Lismore and also the Newtown club for a season in 1923. He returned to Sydney in the 1930s and won three premierships as coach of the Roosters from 1935 to 1937. He coached Norths from 1940 to 1941; Canterbury in 1948 and won another premiership coaching Easts in 1945.

An article on Arthur Halloway appeared in the Sydney Morning Herald on 14 August 1945 – shortly before he brought up his 11th premiership as a player and/or coach.

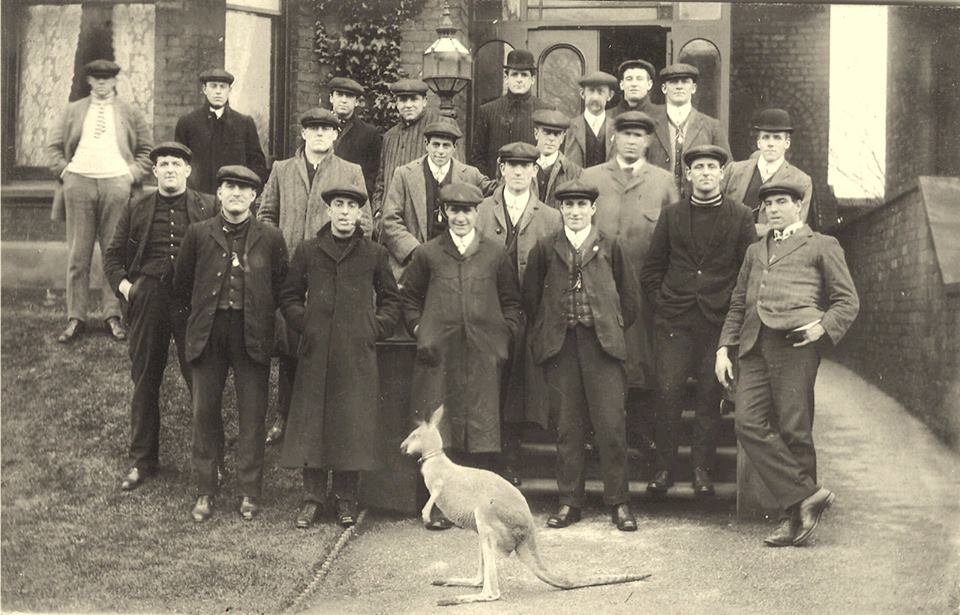
Halloway front mid-left (long coat) with the 1908 Kangaroos

Arthur ("Pony") Halloway, Eastern Suburbs coach, has a double chance this season of chalking up his eleventh Rugby League premiership.

As a player and coach Halloway has been trying on and off for 38 years to win premierships. It will not be his fault if East has to use its second chance in a grand final this season. Halloway is a League pioneer, not of 1908, but of 1907 when he played against Baskerville’s New Zealand team in the first match under League rules in Australia. The 1908-9 Kangaroos are usually regarded as the League’s pioneers and as Halloway was one of them he has a second claim to the distinction. He made his second tour of England in 1911–12, and in the following three seasons helped Eastern Suburbs win two premierships. From 1915 to 1920 Halloway played for Balmain and shared in five more premierships. In 1919, 11 years after his first tour with the Kangaroos, Halloway was captain of an Australian side to New Zealand. He has also represented New South Wales against Queensland. In 1921–22 when he played in Queensland Halloway represented against his home state. His most spectacular successes as a coach were in 1935-36-37 with East' remarkable club sides. Easts' won the premierships in those seasons, bringing Halloway's total to 10. Halloway's long association with League’s successes and failures has case-hardened his emotions. His perfect equanimity, whatever the result is a valuable antidote to the chagrin by self-complacency of players or officials. Halloway never harps on fault or overpraises cleverness. He has a nice encouraging way with both. The player who dropped passes gets more handling practice without recrimination: the clever one is brought into moves to emphasis team work. Halloway's greatest admirers are his players. They praise his astuteness, are encouraged by his diligence and like his good humour. The hardest man to draw into conversation about Halloway is Halloway. He loosens up once a year at the Kangaroos reunion but only to tell of the exploits or amusing experiences of others.

Halloway is typical of the great old timers. There is no first person pronoun in their vocabularies.

— Sydney Morning Herald

== Accolades ==
All up Pony Halloway went on four overseas playing tours. He won seven premierships as a player and four as a coach. He stands as Balmain's most successful all time coach winning 79% of the matches in which he guided the club. He was involved in the game at the top level either as player or coach in a career spanning 37 years. He was awarded Life Membership of the New South Wales Rugby League in 1914.

In 2007 he was inducted into the Australian Rugby League Hall of Fame. In February 2008, Halloway was named in the list of Australia's 100 Greatest Players (1908–2007) which was commissioned by the NRL and ARL to celebrate the code's centenary year in Australia. He was assigned inductee number 6 in the NRL Hall of Fame.

== Footnotes ==
Preceded by Sid Deane	Australian national rugby league captain 1919	Succeeded by Albert Johnston
