= Dan Frawley =

Australian rugby league footballer (1882–1967)

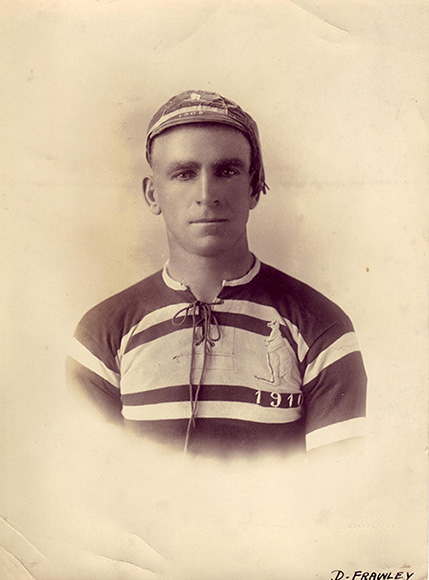
- Dan Frawley, 1911 Kangaroo Tourist

Personal information
- Full name: Daniel O'Connell Frawley
- Born: 15 December 1882 Sydney, New South Wales, Australia
- Died: 30 June 1967 (aged 84) Kensington, New South Wales, Australia

Playing information
- Position: Wing
Club
Years	Team	Pld	T	G	FG	P
1908–15	Eastern Suburbs	70	54	19	0	200
1909–10	Warrington	19	8	0	0	24
	Total	89	62	19	0	224
Representative
Years	Team	Pld	T	G	FG	P
1908–12	City NSW	3	6	0	0	18
1908–14	Australia	7	4	2	0	16
- Military career
- Allegiance: Australia
- Branch: Australian Army
- Service years: 1899-1908
- Unit: Australian Commonwealth Horse
- Conflicts: Second Boer War

Daniel O'Connell Frawley (15 December 1882 – 30 June 1967) was a pioneer Australian rugby league footballer, a national representative player. He played his career as a wing with the Eastern Suburbs club in Sydney and is considered one of the nation's finest footballers of the 20th century. A fast and agile wing, with an ability to effortlessly change direction, Frawley was at club and representative levels generally positioned on the outside of rugby league Immortal Dally Messenger, creating a formidable combination. He was a noted speedster who, on the 1908–09 Kangaroo tour of Great Britain, was acclaimed as the "100 yards champion" of the squad.

== Early life ==
Of Irish parentage, Frawley grew up in the inner Sydney harbourside suburb of Woolloomooloo. He served as a Trooper in the 3rd Battalion, Australian Commonwealth Horse during the Second Boer War in South Africa. He first experienced rugby union during his time in South Africa and was chosen in a Commonwealth Serviceman's team which competed against a representative Australian side.

== Playing career ==
In 1908 back in Sydney, Frawley turned to the new professional code and in rugby league's early years he was one of the game's most exciting players. In the 1908 NSWRFL season Frawley played in Easts' first match and was later selected to represent City New South Wales against Queensland. He missed his club's appearance in the final at the end of the season as he had been selected to go on the inaugural Kangaroo tour of 1908–09 playing in two Tests and 22 tour matches. He scored 13 tries on the tour.

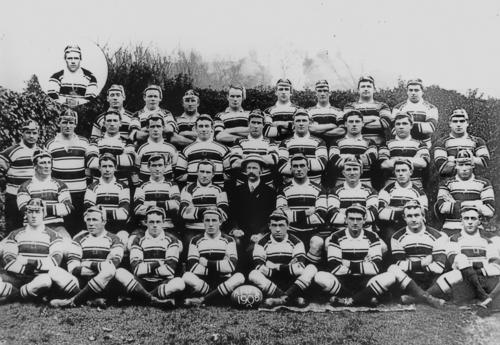
Frawley (back row, 4th from right) Pioneer Kangaroos 1908–09

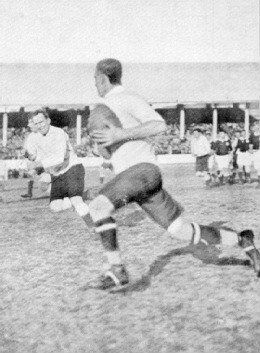
Frawley with ball, outside Messenger 1912 NSW v Qld

Frawley spent the Australian summer of 1909–10 playing in the 1909–10 Northern Rugby Football Union season with English club Warrington, after having signed with them during the previous year's Kangaroo Tour. His sign-on fee was 125 pounds (based on increases in average earnings, this would be approximately £45,440 in 2015). and a further 3 pounds, 5 shillings a week during the season. Frawley played in 19 matches for Warrington club scoring 8 tries. After returning to Australia in 1910 Frawley made a guest appearance for England team in their tour match against Newcastle.

He played in Easts' first premiership-winning side of NSWRL season 1911. When he toured England a second time, with the 1911–12 Kangaroo tour of Great Britain a dispute broke out over his playing eligibility due to an outstanding contractual matter from his 1909–10 Northern Rugby Football Union season spell with Warrington. The dispute saw him miss the first part of the tour, but after eventually being granted a clearance Frawley scored 18 tries in the remaining 12 matches. Frawley also won a second premiership with the Eastern Suburbs club the following year. Frawley was also a member of the first NSW sides to tour New Zealand in 1912 and 1913.

He took out a third consecutive premiership in NSWRL season 1913. This gave the club permanent ownership of the New South Wales Rugby League's first trophy, the Royal Agricultural Society Shield. Frawley captained the side in his final season 1914, the year the club won its first City Cup. His penultimate Test match against England was the first Test to be played at the Sydney Cricket Ground and his final Test match also in Sydney in 1914 was the famous 'Rorke's Drift Test' in which England, reduced to just 10 men, held out to win the match 14–6 and with it the series. All up he played a total of fifty-nine first grade matches for his club side Eastern Suburbs and in seven Test matches for Australia, making two Kangaroo Tours. He was awarded Life Membership of the New South Wales Rugby League in 1914.

He appeared in an Australian film In the Last Stride (1916).

Frawley was said to be quick-witted and extremely competitive in nature. He appears to have been one of the game's earliest sledgers. Former teammate Horrie Miller, many years later, recalled

"I remember Dan walking onto the field one day against a champion winger. The first thing he did was to go up to him and say 'I saw your dad this morning. He asked me not to dump you too hard.' then later in the game, having dumped his rival hard, possibly from an offside position, he jawed at him, 'so you're so-and-so, the great international winger. Well, I got you that time. I don't think you're so hot'."

== Post-playing ==
Frawley, who had been an emergency for the rebel series against the New Zealand 'All Golds', was later made a life member of the New South Wales Rugby League for his role in the series that helped to establish rugby league in this country. For many years he worked at the NSW Leagues Club in Sydney as Chief Steward.

In The First Kangaroos, a 1988 British–Australian made for TV sports film, Frawley's role was played by Tony Martin.

In February 2008, Frawley was named in the list of Australia's 100 Greatest Players (1908–2007) which was commissioned by the NRL and ARL to celebrate the code's centenary year in Australia.

On his death in 1967, the Rugby League News called Frawley "one of rugby league's most colourful identities" and declared that "he would have been an immortal in the code's history for any one of a number of just reasons."

== Sources ==
- Whiticker, Alan & Hudson, Glen (2006) The Encyclopedia of Rugby League Players, Gavin Allen Publishing, Sydney
- Andrews, Malcolm (2006) The ABC of Rugby League Austn Broadcasting Corpn, Sydney
- Heads, Ian and Middleton, David (2008) A Centenary of Rugby League, MacMillan Sydney
