= Jack Watkins (rugby league) =

Australia international rugby league footballer

Personal information
- Full name: Jack Cosgrove Watkins
- Born: 12 February 1893 Sydney, New South Wales
- Died: 13 July 1974 (aged 81)

Playing information
- Position: Lock, Second-row, Hooker
Club
Years	Team	Pld	T	G	FG	P
1913–26	Eastern Suburbs	136	25	0	0	75
Representative
Years	Team	Pld	T	G	FG	P
1914–24	New South Wales	13	2	0	0	6
1914–21	Australia	7	1	0	0	3
1914–23	Metropolis	5	0	0	0	0

Jack Cosgrove "Bluey" Watkins (1893–1974) was an Australian rugby league footballer.

== Career ==
He played lock, with seven test matches for his country, including the 1921–22 Kangaroo tour of Great Britain. He is listed on the Australian Players Register as Kangaroo No. 92.

Watkins played for just one club in the New South Wales Rugby Football League premiership throughout his career which spanned 14 years, interrupted by the First World War. He played in over 100 matches for the Eastern Suburbs side between 1913 and 1926, winning Premierships with that club in 1913 and 1923. Watkins also won City Cups with the Easts club in 1914, 1915 and 1916.

After enlisting in the First World War, Watkins was chosen to play a series of matches for Australian Imperial Forces (AIF) against England.

Bluey Watkins died on 13 July 1974, age 82.

== Sources ==
- Heads, Ian and Middleton, David (2008) A Centenary of Rugby League, MacMillan Sydney
