= Royal Agricultural Society Shield =

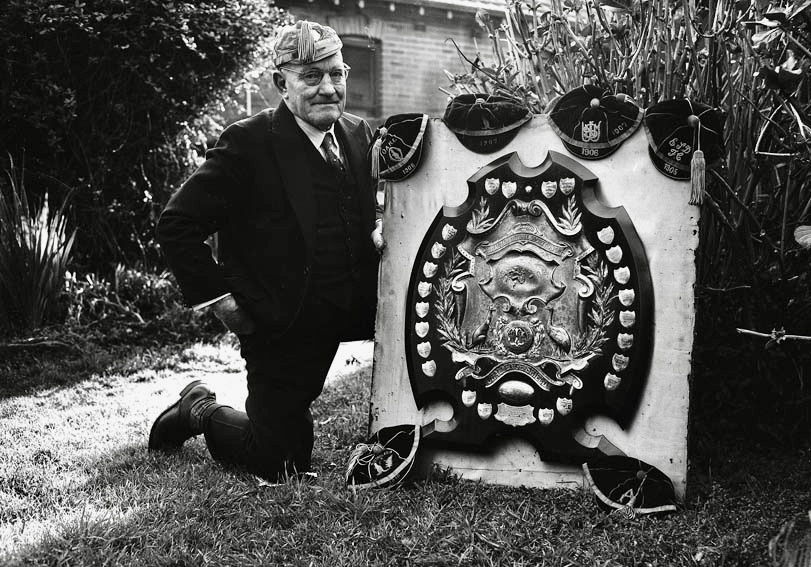
Dally Messenger with the original Royal agricultural society shield gifted to him by Eastern Suburbs NRL rugby league club

The Royal Agricultural Society of New South Wales Challenge Shield, or RAS Shield was the New South Wales Rugby Football League's first premiership trophy. It was presented to each year's premiership winning rugby league team, and was won by South Sydney, Newtown and Eastern Suburbs. The first club to win three successive titles would take permanent ownership of the shield. The Eastern Suburbs club achieved this feat winning premierships in 1911, 1912 and 1913.

The hand crafted black mahogany shield embossed with silver was donated to the NSWRFL by the Royal Agricultural Society of New South Wales in its first year of competition.

Leading journalist Claude Corbett wrote in Sydney, Sun, newspaper on, 1 May 1914,

The Royal Agricultural Society Shield, which was presented at the inception of the League's first grade competition has been won outright by Eastern Suburbs, who upset all calculations by winning the premiership three years in succession. The club has presented the shield to their captain, Dally Messenger, 'as a token of appreciation of his captaincy.

The shield was passed on from generation to generation in the Messenger family until in 2005, Dally Messenger III handed it over to the National Museum of Australia in Canberra.

The shield is now part of the National Museum of Australia's National Historical Collection. Its association with the genesis of rugby league in Australia, and its connection to the game's first great star, make it one of the most important rugby league treasures held in a public collection in Australia.

== See also ==
- J. J. Giltinan Shield
- Winfield Cup
