= Wally Messenger =

Australia international rugby league footballer

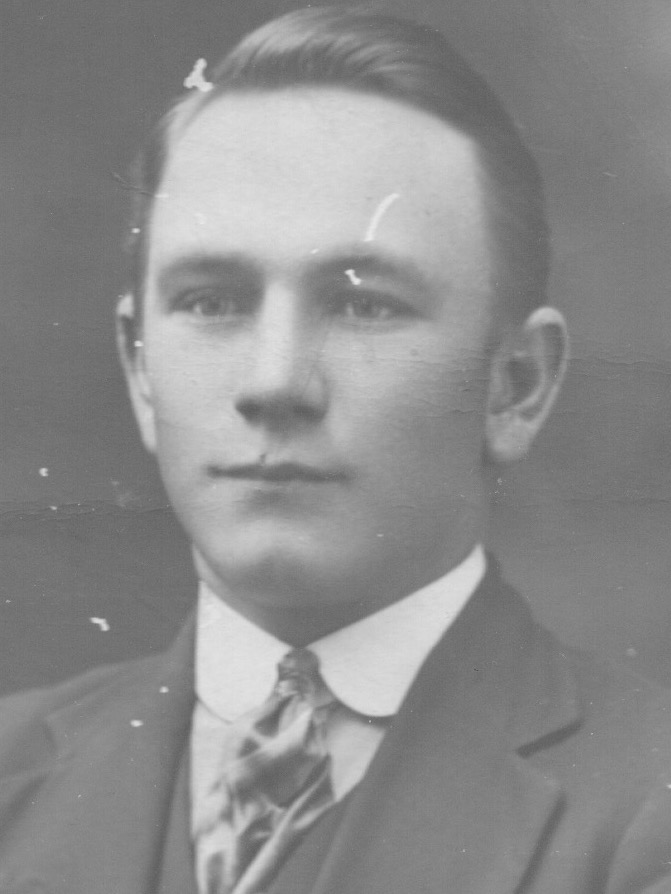

Personal information
- Full name: Walter Messenger
- Born: 9 July 1891 Woollahra, New South Wales, Australia
- Died: 1 January 1961 (aged 69) Clareville, New South Wales, Australia

Playing information
- Position: Wing
Club
Years	Team	Pld	T	G	FG	P
1912–20	Eastern Suburbs	98	50	237	0	624
Representative
Years	Team	Pld	T	G	FG	P
1913–14	New South Wales	2	0	0	0	0
1914	Australia	2	1	3	0	9
- Relatives: Dally Messenger (brother)

Walter Messenger (9 July 1891 – 1 January 1961) was the youngest son of Charles A. Messenger and Annie (née Atkinson). He was an Australian rugby league footballer who played in the 1910s and into the 1920s. He was a state and national representative winger whose club career was played with Eastern Suburbs in the New South Wales Rugby Football League premiership.

The younger brother of league great Dally Messenger, Wally Messenger won premierships with Easts in NSWRFL season 1912 and NSWRFL season 1913, playing with his brother as captain.

He made two Test appearances for Australia's National Rugby League team, The Kangaroos in the 1914 domestic Ashes series, kicking three goals on debut and scoring a try in the deciding test of the series. He represented for New South Wales in one match against Queensland also in 1914.

For the 1915 season, he was the NSW Rugby Football League's top point-scorer. Wally Messenger is listed on the Australian Players Register as Kangaroo No.93.

== Early life ==
Wally Messenger, the youngest of the eight children of Charles Amos Messenger, was part of an "era of sporting achievement" of the Double Bay Public School. Both Wally and his older brother Dally (by seven years) were coached by an enthusiastic and dedicated teacher John Moclair, encouraged by principal Henry Giles Shaw (1891–1896). For many years they ensured that the Rugby team was undefeated in inter-schools competitions at Junior level. They quite often defeated teams from the Senior Schools competition as well, including a victory over the Fort Street High School, winners of the senior competition.

== The Relationship between the brothers: Wally and Dally ==
In the course of history Wally Messenger's achievements have been somewhat eclipsed by the fame of his older brother Dally. Yet at the time of Wally's rugby league career Dally supported and lauded Wally's sporting development in every way he could.

Dally encouraged his seven years younger brother Wally, when he played Australian rules football at the Double Bay School, and in a local Australian rules competition in 1906, when Wally was sixteen. The Arrow described Wally "as nimble and as clever as footballers are made".

Wally then switched to Rugby League. On 18 May 1912 Wally entered first grade in an Eastern Suburbs match against South Sydney. The brothers played thereafter together at top level. Dally, normally the team's goal kicker, often shared the kicks with Wally.

"He is not as unorthodox as his brother," said The Referee, "but he has the power to field and kick the ball with infinitely greater skill than the average player". The Referee described Wally as having "infinitely greater skill than the average player. He is a strongly built tricky young man, and is very dangerous."

Wally played two tests for Australia in 1914. Tragically, World War I (1914–1918) intervened and put a stop to his very promising football future. Dally is quoted as saying: "... given my opportunities, Wally would have been a world beater."

== The Rorke’s Drift Rugby League Test Match of 1914 ==
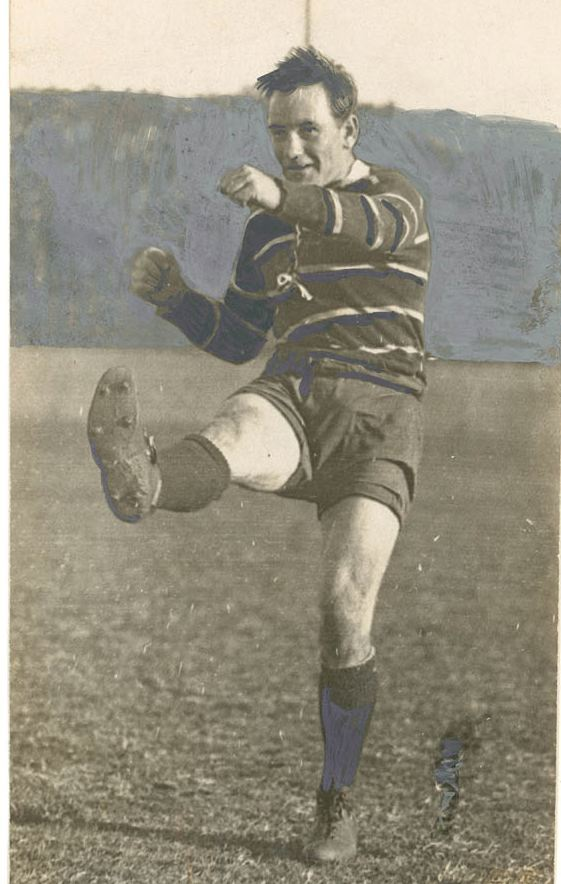
Wally Messenger

Wally Messenger was prominent in perhaps the most legendary game of Rugby League ever chronicled. It was described as Rorke's Drift, an analogy to an outnumbered embattled group of British soldiers in Southern Africa who won a victory over a much larger and formidable army of Zulu warriors (1879).

It was the third Test Match of Australia versus Great Britain, played in Sydney on the 4 July 1914. Great Britain, playing three men short owing to a string of injuries, nevertheless, by heroic and fiercely resolute play, won the Test, 14 points to 6. On the Australian side Wally Messenger scored one of their two tries.
