= Sandy Pearce =

Australian rugby league footballer and boxer

- Pearce in 1910

Personal information
- Full name: Sidney Charles Pearce
- Born: 30 May 1883 Double Bay, Sydney, Australia
- Died: 14 November 1930 (aged 47) Double Bay, Australia

Playing information
- Height: 178 cm (5 ft 10 in)
- Weight: 87 kg (13 st 10 lb)
- Position: Hooker
Club
Years	Team	Pld	T	G	FG	P
1908–21	Eastern Suburbs	156	9	0	0	27
Representative
Years	Team	Pld	T	G	FG	P
1910–20	New South Wales	6	1	0	0	3
1908–22	Australia	14	0	0	0	0
- Source: As of 1 August 2009
- Relatives: Joe Pearce (son)

Sid Pearce directs here, for his son, the rugby league footballer of the same name, see Joe Pearce

Sidney Charles Pearce (born 30 May 1883 and died 14 November 1930 Double Bay, New South Wales), better known as Sandy, was a pioneer Australian rugby league footballer and boxer. He is considered one of the nation's finest footballers of the 20th century. In 1907 he played for New South Wales in the first rugby match run by the newly created 'New South Wales Rugby Football League' which had just split away from the established New South Wales Rugby Football Union. He made his first national representative appearance in 1908.

== Club career ==
A hooker, Pearce played his whole career of 157 matches for the Eastern Suburbs club between 1908 and 1921. Pearce was a member of the Eastern Suburbs side that won three consecutive premierships from 1911–13. He was also a member of the three Easts City Cup winning sides from 1914 to 1916. He was the first Eastern Suburbs player to register 100 matches with the club and the first in the New South Wales Rugby Football League premiership to play in 150 matches.

== Representative career ==
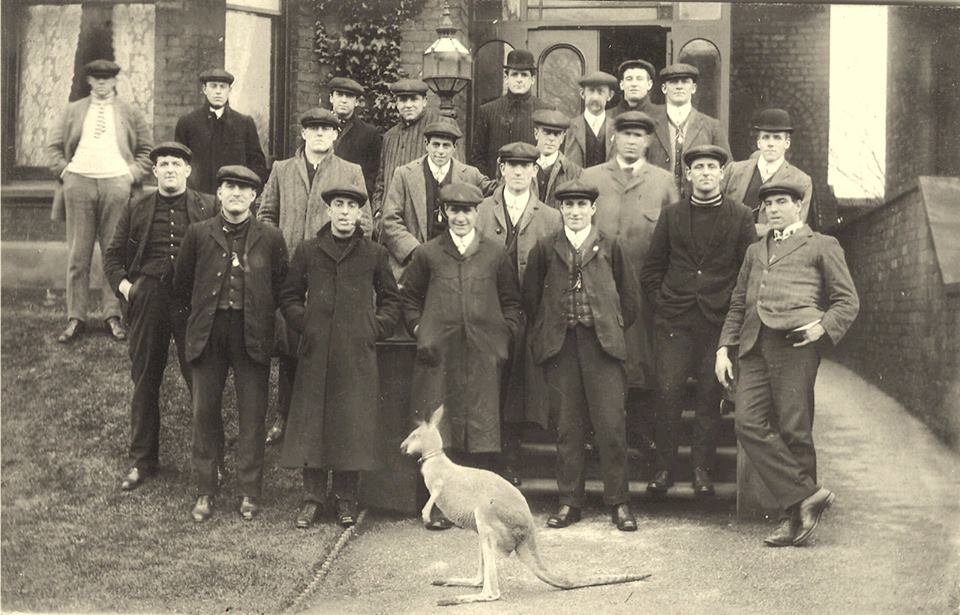
Pearce front 2nd from right (striped collar) with the 1908 Kangaroos

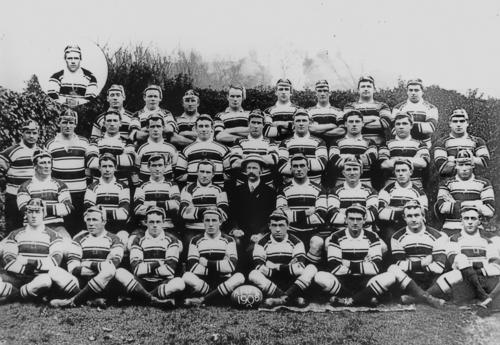
Pearce (3rd row 4th from right) Pioneer Kangaroos 1908–09

Sandy Pearce was a member of the side that played against the New Zealand ‘All Golds' in 1908 helping to establish the code in Australia. He went on the inaugural Kangaroo tour of England in 1908–09 where he was one of only five players from the thirty-five strong touring party to play in all three Test matches. He also played in 30 other minor matches on that tour, he also represented Australasia.

Pearce, along with friend and team-mate Dally Messenger chose not to go on the 1911–12 Kangaroo tour of Great Britain.

At 38 years of age he was again selected for the 1921–22 Kangaroo tour of Great Britain where he played in two Tests and nineteen minor games.

In all he played in fourteen of the first seventeen test matches between Australia and England. Aged 38 years and 158 days for his final Test on 5 November 1921, he became the oldest player ever to represent Australia. He retired as Australia's most-capped rugby league player.

Sandy Pearce and his son Joe Pearce later became the first father and son to represent Australia in rugby league.

Sandy Pearce is listed on the Australian Players Register as Kangaroo No. 17.

== Family of champions ==
Pearce came from a family of sporting champions. His father Harry Pearce (nicknamed "Footy" because of the size of his feet) was a world champion sculler. Sandy's brother Walter was an outstanding long distance cyclist, sister Lilly Pearce was also a noted sculler and the first woman to ride an aquaplane on Sydney harbour. Nephew Bobby Pearce was probably the most recognised – a dual Olympic sculling gold medalist. Sandy's own son Joe Pearce followed in his footsteps playing rugby league for Eastern Suburbs and representing New South Wales and Australia in that sport.

== Accolades ==
He was awarded Life Membership of the New South Wales Rugby League in 1914. Following his retirement from the game as a player Pearce took up a role as trainer with the University club.

== Death ==
Despite having a long and injury free rugby league career, Pearce died age of 47 from what was determined as "heart strain" (myocarditis). The cortège for his funeral was said to be more than a mile long. Famous Rugby league players were the pallbearers including Dally Messenger, Peter Burge, Frank Burge, Arthur Surridge Reg Latta and George Clamback. He was buried at South Head Cemetery on 15 November 1930.

Former Australian teammate Frank Burge, speaking at a function in Pearce's honour in 1940, had this to say

"Football has never had a gamer, rougher, tougher nor more loyal team player. Old Sandy, a hooker, was easily the best I have ever seen in his position. The fact that at 38 when he toured England in 1921 is sufficient testimony to his skill. In the scrums Sandy would have those English hookers eating out of his hand. He would pack in with one arm loose, and as the ball came in he would whack the opposing hooker on the ear, then he would give them a twist, always getting the ball as it came in each time. Pearce had the strength of ten men. He neither drank nor smoked to any extent, and seldom swore. As part of his training he would spar 2 or 3 rounds with 6 or 7 of us in succession, finishing each spar by allowing us to whaile into his body with punches he made no attempt to block. Back home one of his greatest feats of strength was the carrying a bag of oysters, about 100 pounds, from Sussex Street to Double Bay. He also pulled a fishing skiff from Double Bay to Redhead on the South Coast, about 140 miles..."

Dubbed 'The Prince Of Hookers', Pearce appears in Eastern Suburbs 'Team of the Century' and was named in Easts' 'Centurion' team, of notable players who played in over 100 matches for the club. In 2005 he was inducted into the Australian Rugby League Hall of Fame.

In February 2008, Pearce was named in the list of Australia's 100 Greatest Players (1908–2007) which was commissioned by the NRL and ARL to celebrate the code's centenary year in Australia.

In 2008 New South Wales announced their rugby league team of the century, naming Pearce at hooker.
