= City Cup =

Australian rugby league competition

The City Cup was a rugby league competition involving Australian premiership teams. The post season tournament was a regular feature in the years 1912–1925. City Cups were also played in 1937, 1942 and 1959.

The inaugural city cup was contested in 1912 between Glebe and South Sydney with South Sydney winning the final.

== Premiers ==
Year	Champions
1912	South Sydney
1913	Glebe
1914	Eastern Suburbs
1915	Eastern Suburbs
1916	Eastern Suburbs
1917	Balmain
1918	Western Suburbs
1919	Western Suburbs
1920	North Sydney
1921	South Sydney
1922	North Sydney
1923	Balmain
1924	South Sydney
1925	South Sydney
1937	Newtown
1942	Newtown
1959	St. George

== See also ==
- Amco Cup
- NSW Challenge Cup
- New South Wales Rugby League premiership
- Presidents Cup (Rugby League)
- Tooheys Challenge Cup
