= 1912 Eastern Suburbs season =

← 1911	1913 →

Eastern Suburbs (now known as the Sydney Roosters) competed in their fifth New South Wales Rugby League season in 1912. They won their second premiership back to back finishing 1st at the end of the season to claim both the minor and major premiership due to the rule stipulations for that year.

== Players ==
No.

Position
Player

5 Dan Frawley – WG 9 Larry 'Jersey' O'Malley – PR 10 Sid 'Sandy' Pearce – HK 12 W. Smith – WG 18 Herbert Henry 'Dally' Messenger – CE 23 Percy White – PR 25 Mick Frawley – PR 28 Tom Bruce – HB 29 Eddie Griffiths – PR 43 Barney Dalton – SR

No.

Position
Player

45 Bob Williams – PR 49 John 'Dinny' Campbell – CE 51 Fred Kinghorn – FB 53 Eddie White – WG 54 Charlie Lees – PR 56 Harold Corbett – SR 58 W. Dalton – PR 61 Arthur Halloway – HB 62 Wally Messenger – CE 63 A. Allen – PR

== Results ==
- Premiership Round 1, Saturday 4 May 1912.

Eastern Suburbs 8 ( H. H. Messenger Goals ) defeated Annandale 7 ( Lindsay try; Roy Norman 2 Goals ) at the Sydney Sports Ground.

"Eastern Suburbs kicked off, and frees to both sides proved resultless. Play then became exceedingly fast, but many opportunities were lost through wild passing. Roy Norman was playing a good defensive game, and blocked several attempts by Eastern Suburbs to break through. The first points were not long In coming. Lindsay (Annandale) secured after Dalton had fumbled, and crossed over. Roy Norman added the extra points. On resuming the tackling on both sides was good, Roy Norman excelling himself. Subsequently Annandale were penalised for obstruction, and Messenger landed a goal. Eastern Suburbs' handling of the ball was faulty, Messenger sending out several long passes, which were not taken. On the other hand. Annandale were showing out well, the three-quarters putting in excellent work whenever the ball came out to them from the scrum. Then Messenger caused a lull by kicking a goal from a mark. Annandale retaliated, Roy Norman landing a goal from a penalty, thus giving his side a lead of three points. The. game continued very fast, with Annandale holding the advantage, but their attack was jolted by faulty passing. No further scoring resulted before half time, when It was Annandale 7. Eastern Suburbs 4.

On resuming, play was even for a while: then Eastern Suburbs attacked for a briefly period. Then Annandale attacked, and Messenger and his men had to defend for some time. Messenger, however, put his side in a stronger position by kicking another penalty goal. Following this. Annandale put in some brilliant work. Roy Norman secured, and came away with the pack at his heels. He was tackled, but the hall was transferred to Lilyman, thence to Lindsay, but the latter lost the ball on the line. It was a fine effort. Annandale were not having the best of luck, another two points, the result of a penalty kick, being registered against them. Eastern Suburbs now led by 8 points to 7. And Messenger had scored the whole of the points. There now appeared to be little hope for Annandale, and both sides were tiring. The ambulance men were, at this stage, required for the first time, but it was nothing to serious. Annandale made a final dash just before time, but nothing came of It, and a closely contested game finished with Eastern Suburbs leading by a bare point the Final score: - Eastern Suburbs, 8; Annandale, 7." Sydney Morning Herald.

Round	Opponent	Result	Roosters Score	Opponent Score	Date	Venue	Crowd
2	Western Suburbs Magpies	Won	22 (6-2-0)	8 (2-1-0)	11 May 1912	Agricultural	

- Premiership Round 3, Saturday 18 May 1912

Eastern Suburbs 9 Campbell Try; D. Messenger 3 goals) defeated South Sydney 8 (Darmody 4 goals) at the Agricultural Ground. John 'Dinny' Campbell gives his recollections of the event.

"In 1912 Easts' were playing Souths on the Agricultural ground, and, like all such games, this one was as keen as mustard. Early on, with the help of Messenger, I scored between the posts - Easts 5, South 0. Darmondy of Souths kicked a good goal and then kicked another just before the interval, which left Easts leading 5-4 at half time. Soon after the Resumption Darmody kicked a 3rd goal. Souths 6, Easts 5. Gleefully Souths supporters were yelling out: "how do you like it, Dally, being beaten at your own game?" Dally, not to be daunted, kicked a good goal. Easts 7, Souths 6. With about 15 minutes to go Darmody kicked his 4th goal, to lead 8-7. The crowd were ecstatic. Easts were all over Souths but could not penetrate. Then right on the bell, I broke through, came to Hallet, put the ball over his head. It was a great race between Hallet and myself and the deadball line. The dead ball line won. Was that the end? No. Hallet dropped out from the 25-yard line and Dally, appearing from nowhere, caught the ball and called for a 'mark'. A good 5 yards on his own side of halfway and right on the sideline. I can still hear 'Pony' Halloway, Dan Frawley and myself moan at his attitude. We wanted him to come round the open side and with a last effort endeavor to score a try. We claimed it was a million to one chance of his finding the goal posts. As Messenger placed the ball many people began to jeer and hoot. Because of the mark he had taken the ball back another 5 yards making 65 yards from the corner flag. Even some of his own supporters joined in the jeering at his seemingly high opinion of himself. With still greater deliberation, he walked slowly back some six or seven yards, stopped, wiped the toe of his right boot on his left leg and with a quick run launched the mighty kick. The jeers were quietening as the ball started to lift across the ground, as the projection increased some gasps were heard, and the crowd went berserk as the ball flew between the posts and landed over the dead ball line, and Easts had won the match."...John 'Dinny' Campbell.

- Premiership Round 4, Saturday 25 May 1912.

Eastern Suburbs 10 ( H. H Messenger 4, W Messenger goals ) defeated Glebe Dirty Reds 2 ( goal ) at the Agricultural Ground. Crowd: 2200.

Round	Opponent	Result	Roosters Score	Opponent Score	Date	Venue	Crowd
5	Newtown Jets	Lost	2 (0-1-0)	4 (0-2-0)	8 June 1912	Agricultural	8000
6	North Sydney Bears	Won	34 (8-5-0)	7 (1-2-0)	15 June 1912	Agricultural	8000
7	Balmain Tigers	Won	35 (9-4-0)	0 (0-0-0)	29 July 1912	Agricultural	4000
8	Annandale Dales	Won	12 (2-3-0)	7 (1-2-0)	6 July 1912	Wentworth	5000

- Premiership Round 9, 10 August 1912

Eastern Suburbs 41 (W. Messenger 2, E.White 2, Griffiths. Frawley, Campbell tries; H. Messenger 9 goals, ? goal) beat Western Suburbs 9 (A. Joas try; Medcalf 3 goals) at the Agricultural Ground, crowd 2000

“ Eastern Suburbs made merry at the expense of Western Suburbs, whom they defeated by the large margin of 32 points. The premiers took matters very easily throughout, and could have increased their margin if they so wished. Messenger made himself prominent by kicking 9 goals, and otherwise playing splendidly. Kinghorn gave one of his best exhibitions as fullback, and was loudly applauded for blocking a short punt over his head, when all expected Wests to score. Frawley was very elusive, his tricky runs being a feature. Williams And P. White were the best of the forwards...Sydney Mornming Herald”

Round	Opponent	Result	Roosters Score	Opponent Score	Date	Venue	Crowd
10	South Sydney Rabbitohs	Won	10 (2-2-0)	7 (1-2-0)	27 July 1912	Sports Ground	14000

- Premiership Round 11, Saturday 3 August 1912.

Eastern Suburbs 6 (W. Messenger, D. Messenger Goals; D. Messenger Field Goal) defeated Glebe 4 (Theiring 2 Goals) at the Sydney Sports Ground.

With no finals system played in the 1912 season the round 11 clash between the two front running sides went a long way towards determining the Premiers for that season. The match winning play is described this way

"From a scrum, with time running out, the ball swept from Dalton to (D)Messenger on the touchline, the skipper turned inside and potted the winning field goal."

— Sydney Morning Herald

Both Griffiths and Glebe's Redmond were sent off in the match.

- Premiership Round 11, 10 August 1912.

Eastern Suburbs 12 ( Frawley, P. White tries; Messenger, Frawley goals ) defeated Newtown 6 (Russell 3 goals ) at the Agricultural ground. crowd 10,000

But two rounds of the rugby League competition remain to be played, and the last vestige of hope that Glebe possesse of dethroning Eastern Sububurb has almost disappeared, for the Sydney Tricolours will have to be beaten in both contests before they are overhauled by the Reds - a most unlikely happening.

At the Agricultural Ground about 10,000 people witnessed the second meeting of Eastern Suburbs and Newtown. The latter won the first engagement, and they looked like repeating the performance. for the greatest part of the game. However, after enjoying a lead of six points to nil until half way through the second spell, they crumbled before the repeated onslaughts of the premiérs, and had a penalty goal and two converted tries recorded against them.

Round	Opponent	Result	Roosters Score	Opponent Score	Date	Venue	Crowd
13	North Sydney Bears	Won	15 (3-3-0)	10 (2-2-0)	17 August 1912	North Sydney	8000
14	Balmain Tigers	Won	14 (2-4-0)	7 (1-2-0)	24 August 1912	Sports Ground	5000

== Ladder ==
	Team	Pld	W	D	L	PF	PA	PD	Pts
1	Eastern Suburbs	14	13	0	1	230	86	+144	26
2	Glebe	14	11	0	3	199	83	+116	22
3	Newtown	14	9	0	5	178	132	+46	18
4	South Sydney	14	8	0	6	207	137	+70	16
5	Balmain	14	6	0	8	138	168	-30	12
6	North Sydney	14	6	0	8	124	197	-73	12
7	Annandale	14	2	0	12	86	134	-48	4
8	Western Suburbs	14	1	0	13	100	325	-225	2

== Point analysis ==
=== Offence ===
The lowdown:

Eastern Suburbs completed the following score options in the 1912 season:

- 42 tries
- 50 goals
- 2 field goals

The result:

Eastern Suburbs scored a total of 230 points in 1912.

The verdict:

- Eastern Suburbs try scoring ability dropped by 6.6% on their previous season.
- Eastern Suburbs goal scoring ability dropped by 21.8% on their previous season.
- Eastern Suburbs field goal kicking ability was maintained on their previous season.
- Eastern Suburbs overall point scoring ability dropped 15.3% on their previous season.
- Eastern Suburbs total point score dropped by 23.3% on their previous season.

=== Defence ===
The lowdown:

Eastern Suburbs conceded the following score options in the 1912 season:

- 10 tries
- 28 goals
- 0 field goals

The result:

Eastern Suburbs conceded a total of 86 points in the 1912 season.

The verdict:

- Eastern Suburbs try scoring defence improved by 70.5% on their previous season.
- Eastern Suburbs goal kicking defence dropped by 7.1% on their previous season.
- Eastern Suburbs field goal defence improved by 100% on their previous season.
- Eastern Suburbs overall defense improved by 37.7% on their previous season.
- Eastern Suburbs total points against defensive effort improved by 33.3% on their previous season.

== Season highlights ==
- Eastern Suburbs Won their second consecutive premiership by finishing 1st at the end of the regular season.
- Eastern Suburbs won its first minor premiership.

== Notes ==
1. There was no finals played that year, with the winner of the Minor premiership automatically being awarded the 1912 premiership.

Preceded by 1911	Season; 1912	Succeeded by 1913
