= 1911 Eastern Suburbs season =

Rugby season

← 1910	1912 →

Eastern Suburbs District Rugby Football Club (now known as the Sydney Roosters) competed in their fourth New South Wales Rugby League season in 1911, winning their maiden premiership.

== 1911 playing squad ==
No.

Position
Player

5 Dan Frawley – WG 9 Larry 'Jersey' O'Malley – PR 10 Sid 'Sandy' Pearce – HK 18 Herbert Henry 'Dally' Messenger – CE 20 George Green – PR 23 Percy White – PR 25 Mick Frawley – PR 28 Tom Bruce – HB 29 Eddie Griffiths – PR 43 Barney Dalton – SR 45 Bob Williams – PR 49 John 'Dinny' Campbell – CE

No.

Position
Player

50 Leslie Cody – HB 51 Fred Kinghorn – FB 52 F. Strickland – PR 53 Eddie White – WG 54 Charlie Lees – PR 55 A. Nicholson – PR 56 Harold Corbett – SR 57 J. Cunningham – PR 58 William Dalton – PR 59 G. Mackay – SR 60 Herb Collins – FE

== 1911 results ==
Round	Opponent	Result	Roosters Score	Opponent Score	Date	Venue	Crowd
1	Annandale Dales	Won	30 (6–6–0)	3 (1–0–0)	29 April 1911	Agricultural	2000
2	North Sydney Bears	Won	22 (4–5–0)	9 (1–3–0)	6 May 1911	Sports Ground	5000

Premiership Round 3. 13 May Glebe Dirty Reds 8 ( Muggivan, L. Cubitt tries; A.Burge goal ) defeated Eastern Suburbs 0 at Wentworth park. crowd 4000

"Quite the liveliest, contest of the day was that at Wentworth Park, where about 4000 locals cheered the Reds to victory over the redoubtable Eastern Suburbs. It was fast and furious at times. Two men were carried off Injured. Two more were ordered off the field-one for indiscriminate kicking, and one for unnecessarily rough play. Now and then the spectators, worked to a pitch of excitement, started melees of their own. The game itaelf was a triumph for the local forwards, who ran over the opponents, and the Glebe backs, taking advantage of the situation, notched 8 points to nil."

4	Newtown Jets	Lost	7 (1–2–0)	16 (4–2–0)	20 May 1911	Sports Ground	15000
5	Balmain Tigers	Won	16 (4–2–0)	11 (3–1–0)	27 May 1911	Sports Ground	3000
6	Western Suburbs Magpies	Won	22 (4–5–0)	15 (3–3–0)	17 June 1911	Sports Ground	3000
7	South Sydney Rabbitohs	Lost	8 (0–4–0)	12 (2–3–0)	1 July 1911	Sports Ground	10000
8	Balmain Tigers	Won	29 (5–6–1)	7 (1–2–0)	8 July 1911	Birchgrove	4000
9	Western Suburbs Magpies	Draw	8 (2–1–0)	8 (2–1–0)	22 July 1911	Agricultural	2000
10	Newtown Jets	Draw	13 (3–2–0)	13 (3–2–0)	29 July 1911	Agricultural	1000
11	South Sydney Rabbitohs	Won	24 (4–6–0)	14 (4–1–0)	5 August 1911	Sports Ground	15000
12	Glebe Dirty Reds	Won	18 (2–5–1)	8 (2–1–0)	12 August 1911	Sports Ground	16000
13	Annandale Dales	Won	8 (0–4–0)	5 (1–1–0)	19 August 1911	Agricultural	3000

Annandale were out to win from the klck off, whilst there was an absence of life In the work of Eastern Suburbs, who appeared over-confident. A brlghtly-obtained try woke them up slightly; but at half-time they were 5 points in arrears. When, In the second spell, they commenced to make thelr run they found Annandale very solid defenders. Frequently. the fast backs of Eastern Suburbs would whip the ball about with smartness. but each player was grassed very effectively and the tricolours found no path to Annandale's ln-goal. Then Messenger "kicked" his side to victory-as he had done on several previous occasions.

— Sydney Morning Herald Match Report

Round	Opponent	Result	Roosters Score	Opponent Score	Date	Venue	Crowd
14	North Sydney Bears	Won	3 (1–0–0)	0 (0–0–0)	26 August 1911	North Sydney	2000

== 1911 NSWRL ladder ==
	Team	Pld	W	D	L	PF	PA	PD	Pts
1	Glebe	14	11	0	3	244	88	+156	22
2	Eastern Suburbs	14	9	2	3	208	129	+79	20
3	South Sydney	14	9	2	3	188	117	+71	20
4	Newtown	14	6	3	5	154	120	+34	15
5	Annandale	14	5	1	8	113	184	-71	11
6	North Sydney	14	4	1	9	138	209	-71	9
7	Western Suburbs	14	4	1	9	116	189	-73	9
8	Balmain	14	3	0	11	130	255	-125	6

== Eastern Suburbs first premiership ==
- Finals campaign
- premiership Semi Final, Saturday 2 September 1911. At the Sydney Sports Ground. [1]

23	Eastern Suburbs
Tries	Messenger 2, White
Goals	Messenger 7
10	South Sydney
Tries	Hilliard, McCabe
Goals	Dymant 2

Fullback
Fred Kinghorn
Three-Quarters
Barney Dalton
H. H. Messenger(c)
John 'Dinny' Campbell
Eddie White
Halves
Herb Collins
Leslie Cody
Forwards
W. Dalton
Charlie Lees
Sid 'Sandy' Pearce
Eddie Griffiths
Larry O'Malley
Mick Frawley

The attendance of 14,000 at the Sports Ground to witness the Eastern Suburbs-South Sydney match must be considered very satisfactory, If not quite up to expectations, and it was fortunate in a ground that provides so little shelter for the "hillite" that the rain that had fallen during tho previous hour held off for the remainder of the afternoon.

Viewed as a whole, the game fell a little below expectations, but there were many causes to explain It. South Sydney entered the field minus their usual half-back, and included In the team three members from Redfern, who had played a strenuous early match. Eastern Suburbs' halt-back, Corbett, was also on the Injured list. Tho opening stages of the game were all in favour of South Sydney, who rushed the attack, and had the tricolours defending hard, but the tactics that the Easterners had set themselves soon came to tho fore, and had a slackening effect on tho pace and attractiveness of the game. It early became evident that the forward division of Eastern Suburbs were out to hold the ball at all cost, and also that Messenger was not to want in opportunities to augment the score by goal-kicking. The first score resulted from "offside round the serum" by M'Cabe, after a long kick from the touch line by Messenger had been knocked on by Brown, and the second was also from a penalty kick. The third was marked by Kinghorn from Rix, and was a beautiful goal from near half-way. The half was devoid of tries, each side staving off tho somewhat spasmodic onslaughts largely carried on by 'the forwards, and contained few attempts to open up play for the backs. Tho remainder of the game was far brighter and more to the taste of the average football follower, who is pleased when the ball Is being flicked from hand to hand. The forwards let the ball go more, and though! the marking and goal-kicking continued, it was sandwiched in between soino clinking tries resulting from individual and collective efforts that were heartily appreciated. Eastern Suburbs added three tries and four goals during this half, while South Sydney added two tries and two goals. The goal kicking apart, tho relative form of tho sides may be gauged from their ability to score trios' South Sydney backs at no time entered the game with any vim in attack, though they sparkled occasionally, while the Easterners wore kept busy by Cody shining in the loose play. To the Inimitable Messenger the side wholly owes its win, as he played a truly wonderful game. Twenty-three points to 10 shows a winning margin, but of the 23 Messenger contributed no fewer than 20, and played a conspicuous part in the movement leading up to the try to White's credit. Two tries and seven goals make up the total, and for prettiness and effect his two tries easily excel. With White, he combined nicely in the first after starting the move from his own side of half-way, but the second excelled it, as Campbell. Lees, Messenger, White, and Messenger again rushed onward in a beautiful passing bout that could have few peers.

South Sydney fought on as only a gritty side could, but their combination was a wee bit awry. M'Cabe missed, in some of his quick dashes past the opposing five-eight, the pass from the scrum that Butler has accustomed him to, and his sphere of usefulness was limited. The soundness of the Eastern Suburbs pack also tended to upset them. The game was marred by a display of fisticuffs just prior to the close, but the whistle was sounded before it became serious.

— Sydney Morning Herald Match Report

- premiership Final, 9 September 1911, at the Agricultural Ground.

22	Eastern Suburbs
Tries	White 2, Griffiths, Cody
Goals	Messenger 5
9	Glebe
Tries	R. Burge
Goals	A. B. Burge, Algie
Field Goal	Algie

Fullback
Fred Kinghorn
Three-Quarters
Barney Dalton
H. H. Messenger(c)
John 'Dinny' Campbell
Eddie White
Halves
Herb Collins
Leslie Cody
Forwards
W. Dalton
Charlie Lees
Eddie Griffiths
Sid 'Sandy' Pearce
Larry O'Malley
Mick Frawley

A spring like day, with the sun shining brightly and a gentle nor’ easter blowing was experienced by the finalists in the 1st grade - Glebe and Eastern Suburbs and about 16,000 spectators were kept interested throughout through a stirring if not brilliant exposition of rugby [league].

The most sanguine of Eastern Suburbs supporters hardly hoped that the tricolours would triumph by tho margin of points that, favoured them at the close of the game To win by 22 points to 9 in a final match indicates a vast superiority on the one side and the form of the victors, which was the best all round they have displayed this season and was far in advance of that of their opponent. That Messenger would prove a powerful factor in the victory, was only to be expected, but his efforts were well supported by his comrades who scored 4 tries between them, whilst the captain sandwiched 5 goals amongst his many clever doings. Only once did Glebe cross their opponents line so determined was. the tackling aid so skilful the defence The game was not so attractive as some that have proceeded it, but proved fairly fast in the opening half. Messeimer early treated the spectators to a very fine goal landed from five yards the other side of halfway, and thereafter Eastern Suburbs demonstrated their ability to beat Glebe as scrumnagers and were also quicker in the rushes. The back division backed up the vanguard more consistently, and brought of some bright passing moves, in which Cody was very noticeable.

Early in the second spell Eastern Suburbs established a winning lead, and to some extent relaxed, their aggressive tactics of the first half and slowed the game up. The form of Glebe was highly disappointing throughout. They appeared at times to be nonplussed by the vigor of the Easterner’s rushes and quite failed to hold the scrummages, excepting a brief period late in the game the back positions were quiet outclassed. Algie alone performing with credit. Had L. Cubllt, at five-eight let the ball go with more freedom better results would have been achieved.

— Sydney Morning Herald Match Report

- premiership Final re-match, Saturday 16 September 1911. [2]

11	Eastern Suburbs
Try	Lees
Goals	Messenger 3
Field Goal	Messenger 1
8	Glebe
Tries	C. R. Cubitt 2
Field Goal	L. Cubitt

Fullback
Fred Kinghorn
Three-Quarters
Barney Dalton
John 'Dinny' Campbell
H. H. Messenger(c)
Eddie White
Halves
Herb Collins
Leslie Cody
Forwards
W. Dalton
Charlie Lees
Eddie Griffiths
Mick Frawley
Sid 'Sandy' Pearce
Larry O'Malley

Played in blustery conditions, Glebes form improved greatly but they could not compete with the immaculate kicking of Dally Messenger.

In an incident packed opening stanza McMahon reduced each side to twelve men by sending off O'Malley and Pert after a touch judges report. Ensuing scrums were played with only four forwards. Glebe three - quarter Gleeson left the field with an ankle injury and was replaced at half time by Farrelly.

With first use of the stiff southerly, Glebe winger C. R. Cubitt scored out Wide in the second minute from a scrum close to the easts line. Messenger replied with a goal shortly after for Glebe to lead 5-2 at halftime. When play resumed, Messenger scored a goal again to narrow the gap to one point. Twelve minutes in, Glebe edged to an 8-4 lead when Cubitt crossed for his second try-a brilliant length of the field effort featuring Farrelly, Redmond, A. Burge and finally Cubitt who beat Messengers ankle tap.

With thirteen minutes left in the grand final, Lees scored Easts only try, from a high kick the ball bounced off dazed Glebe fullback Algie (who had been injured in a head clash in the opening minutes with winger White). Messenger converted and Easts snatched a 9-8 lead. Messenger's field goal six minutes from the bell gave his team the three point buffer at 11-8 and the confidence to hang on and win their first premiership. After exchanging jerseys, the elated surfsiders carried Messenger from the field.

— Steve Hadden

=== Offence ===
The lowdown:

Eastern Suburbs completed the following score options in the 1911 season:

- 45 tries
- 64 goals
- 2 field goals

== Defence ==
The lowdown:

Eastern Suburbs conceded the following score options in the 1911 season:

- 34 tries
- 26 goals
- 1 field goals

The result:

Eastern Suburbs conceded a total of 129 points in the 1911 season.

The verdict:

- Eastern Suburbs try scoring defence dropped by 35.2% on their previous season.
- Eastern Suburbs goal kicking defence dropped by 7.6% on their previous season.
- Eastern Suburbs field goal defence was maintained on their previous season.
- Eastern Suburbs overall defense dropped by 10% on their previous season.
- Eastern Suburbs total points against defensive effort improved by 17.7% on their previous season.

== 1911 season highlights ==
- Eastern Suburbs won their first premiership defeating the Glebe 11–8 in the Final.
- Won the 1911 reserve grade competition for the fourth year in a row.
- Dally Messenger was the top point scorer in the NSWRL with 148 points.
- Eastern Suburbs were once again the winners of the presidents cup competition.
- Eastern Suburbs players to represent Australia were:- Dan Frawley & Bob Williams
- Eastern Suburbs players to gain selection for that year's Kangaroo Tour were:- Dan Frawley & Bob Williams.
- Eastern Suburbs played their first match at the Sydney Sports Ground.
- Dan Frawley was the first rugby league player to score a try on the Sydney Cricket Ground, Dally Messenger the first to kick a goal.

== Notes ==
1. No Semi-final would normally be required under the rules of the day. However, because Eastern Suburbs and South Sydney finished level on points, They played off to see who met the minor premiers Glebe, in the final.
2. As minor premiers Glebe had the right of challenge, if beaten. A second final was played one week later.
3. While representing NSW in an interstate match against Queensland, Dally Messenger scored a record 32 points, coming from four tries and ten goals. In the 3 match series, Messenger scored a total of 72 points.
4. Dan Frawley, while playing in a representative match, became the first rugby league player to score a try on the Sydney Cricket Ground.

Preceded by 1910	Season; 1911	Succeeded by 1912
