= 1912 NSWRFL season =

Rugby league competition

- League: New South Wales Rugby Football League
- Duration: 4 May to 24 August
- Teams: 8
- Matches played: 56
- Points scored: 1262
- Premiers: Eastern Suburbs (2nd title)
- Minor Premiers: Eastern Suburbs (1st title)
- Runners-up: Glebe
- Wooden spoon: Western Suburbs (3rd spoon)
- Top point-scorer: Dally Messenger (80)
- Top try-scorer: Roy Algie (12)

Second Grade
- Number of teams: 17
- Premiers: Glebe
- Runners-up: Redfern

Third Grade
- Number of teams: 20 (1 disqualified)
- Premiers: South Sydney
- Runners-up: South Sydney Federals

The 1912 New South Wales Rugby Football League premiership was the fifth season of Sydney’s rugby league club competition, Australia’s first. Eight teams from across the city contested during the season for the premiership and the Royal Agricultural Society Challenge Shield.

== Season summary ==
From 1912 to 1925, the team finishing on top of the ladder after the home-and-away rounds was automatically deemed premiers unless two clubs were on equal points at this point in which case a final was held. This move by the New South Wales Rugby League may well have been in response to Eastern Suburbs’ victory in the season before, where they overcame minor premiers Glebe in two successive finals to claim the premiership.

With four rounds remaining in the 1912 season, Eastern Suburbs and Glebe were clearly ahead of the rest of the teams and it looked unlikely that they would be caught. The two clubs were matched up against each other in Round 11 at the Sydney Sports Ground in what would ultimately decide the fate of the premiership, with Glebe just two points behind Eastern Suburbs on the ladder. In front of 25,000 people, the two clubs played out a closely fought match in muddy conditions. Dally Messenger was able to break a 4–4 deadlock late in the match by kicking a field goal after a scrum win close to the sideline and win the game 6–4 for Eastern Suburbs.

With a four-point premiership lead and only three rounds to play, Eastern Suburbs, who had only lost one game before in the season to eventual third-placed Newtown, looked uncatchable. That turned out to be the case, with Eastern Suburbs winning their remaining three games to take away the premiership.

Also this season Pratten Park became the Western Suburbs club's homeground.

== Teams ==
The teams remained unchanged from the previous season.

- Annandale
- Balmain, formed on 23 January 1908 at Balmain Town Hall
- Eastern Suburbs, formed on 24 January 1908 at Paddington Town Hall
- Glebe, formed on 9 January 1908
- Newtown, formed on 14 January 1908
- North Sydney, formed on February 7, 1908, at the North Sydney School of Arts in Mount Street
- South Sydney, formed on 17 January 1908 at Redfern Town Hall
- Western Suburbs, formed on 4 February 1908

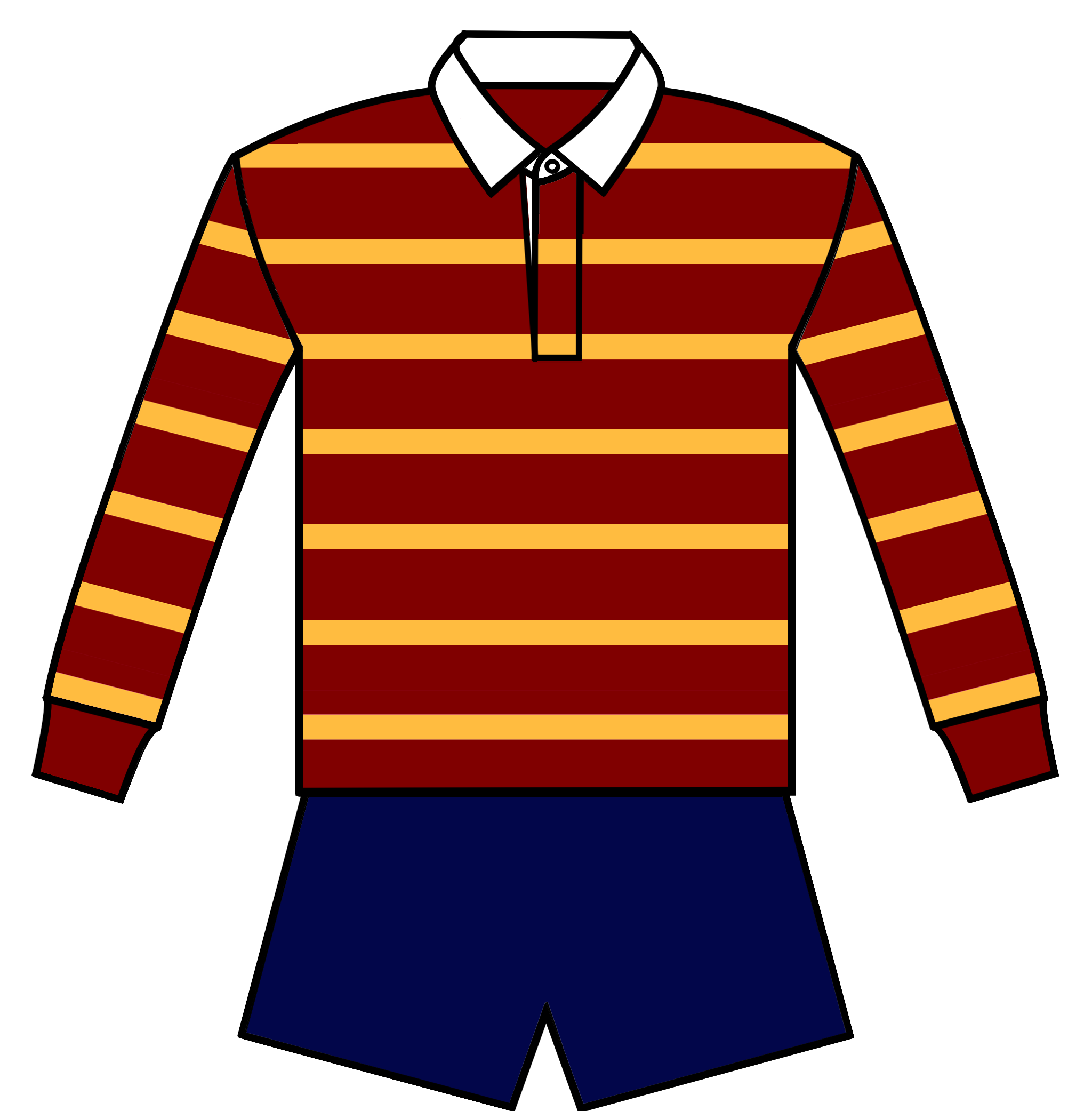
Annandale; 3rd season Ground: Wentworth Park; Coach: Captain: Ray Norman

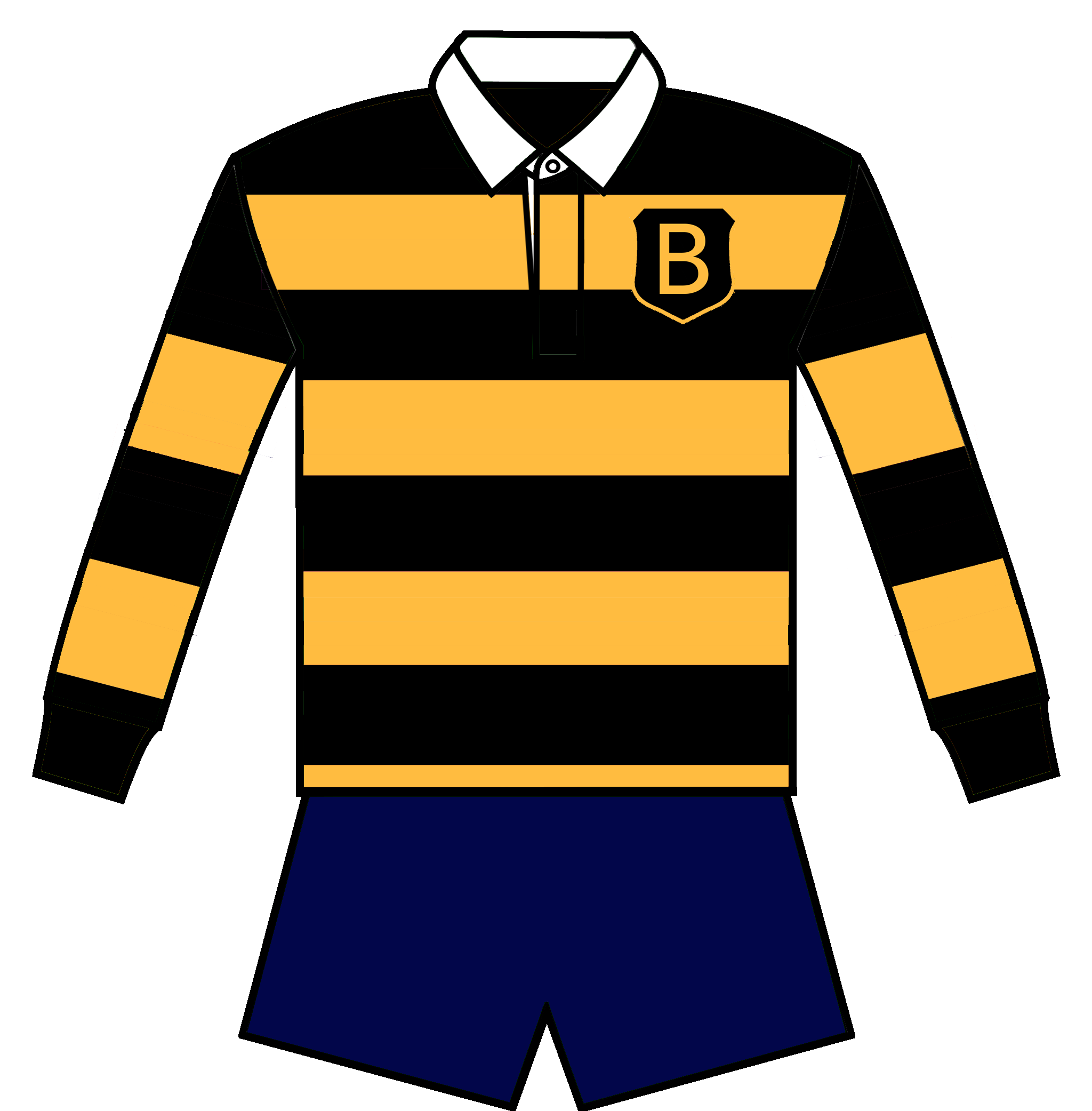
Balmain; 5th season Ground: Birchgrove Oval; Coach: Bob Graves; Captain: Bob Craig

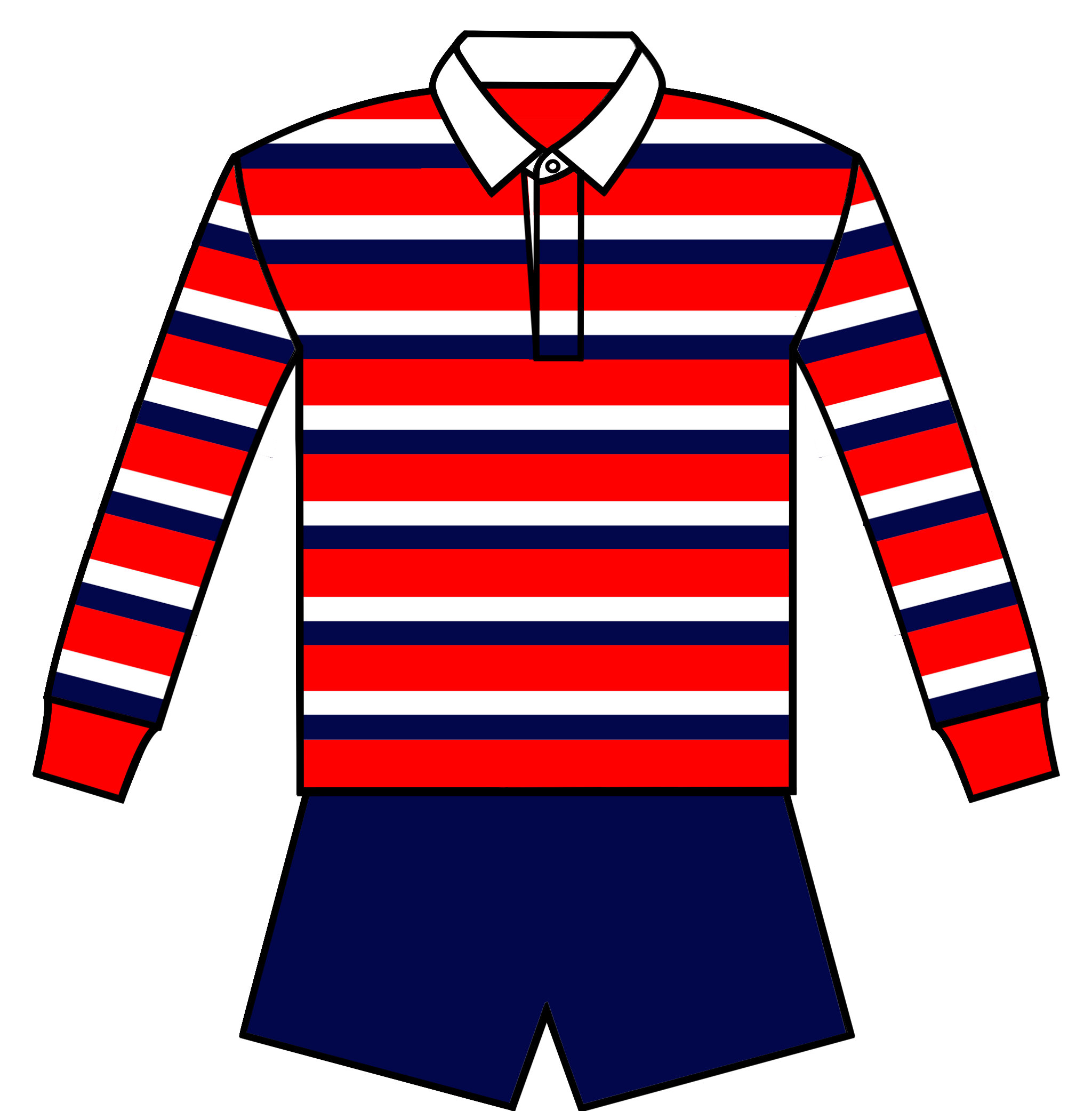
Eastern Suburbs; 5th season Ground: Sydney Sports Ground; Captain-Coach: Dally Messenger

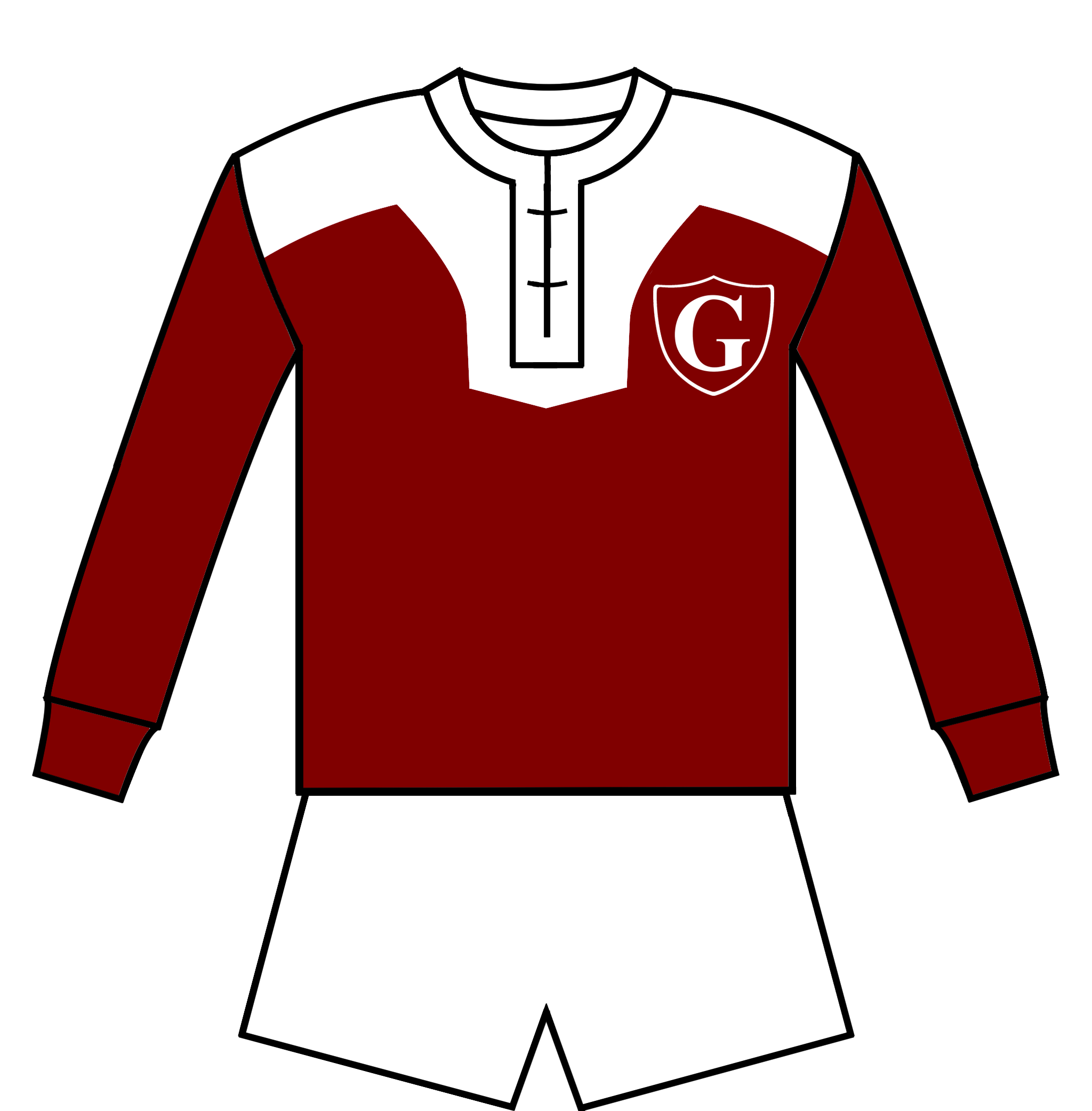
Glebe; 5th season Ground: Wentworth Park; Captain-Coach: Chris McKivat

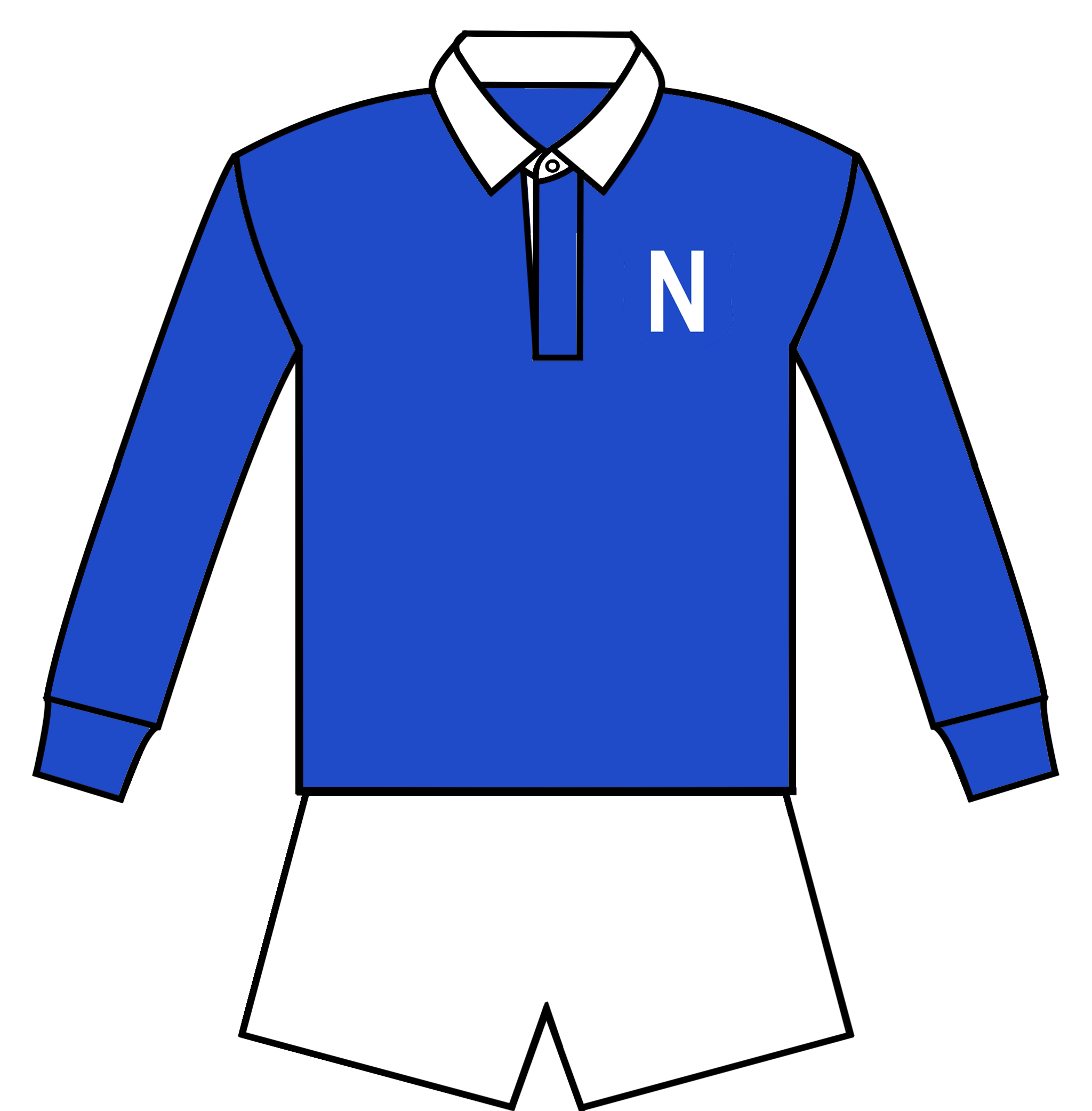
Newtown; 5th season Ground: Erskineville Oval; Captain-Coach: Bill Noble

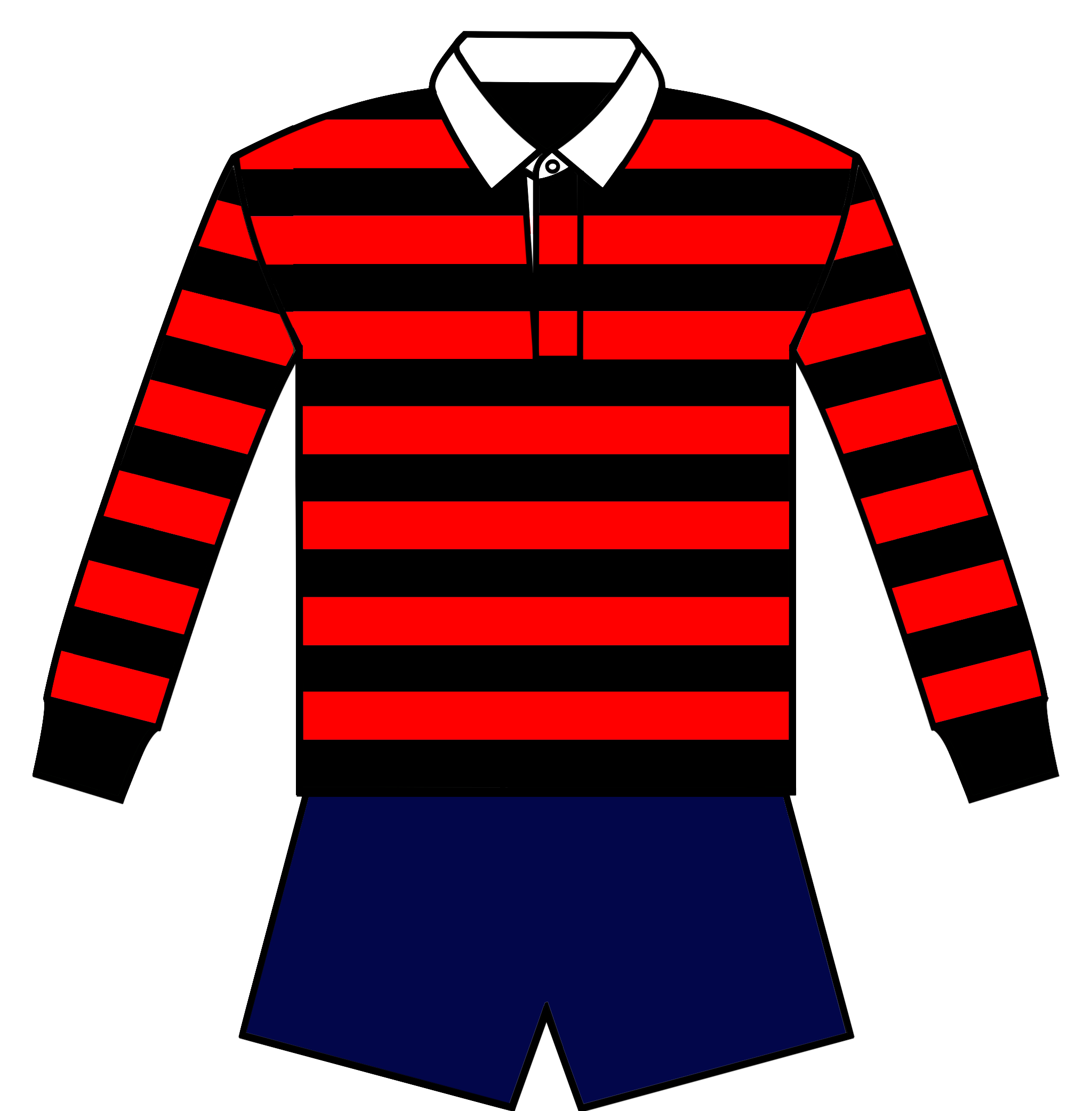
North Sydney; 5th season Ground: North Sydney Oval; Coach: Captain: Albert Broomham

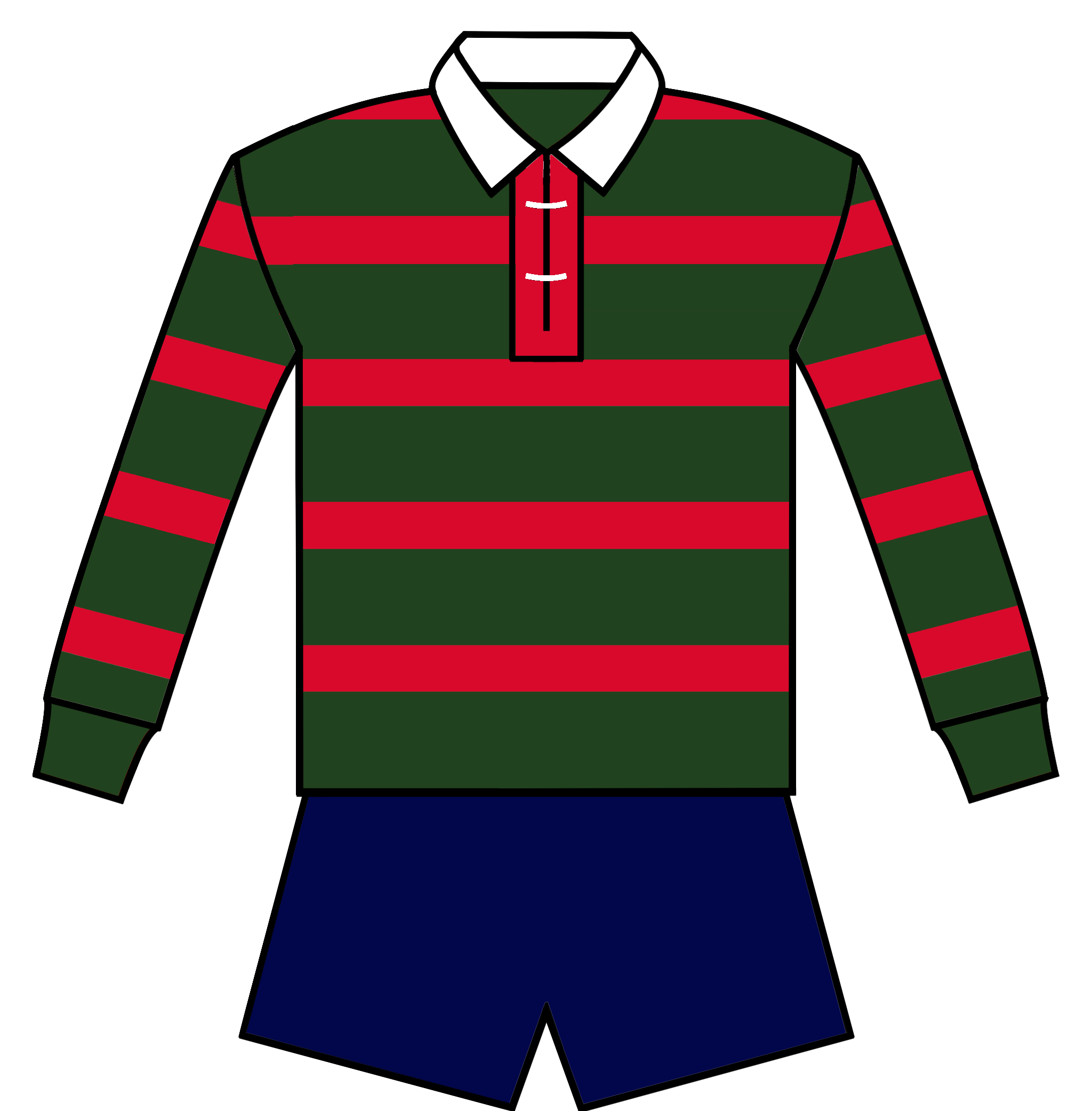
South Sydney; 5th season Ground: Sydney Sports Ground; Coach: Captain: Arthur Butler

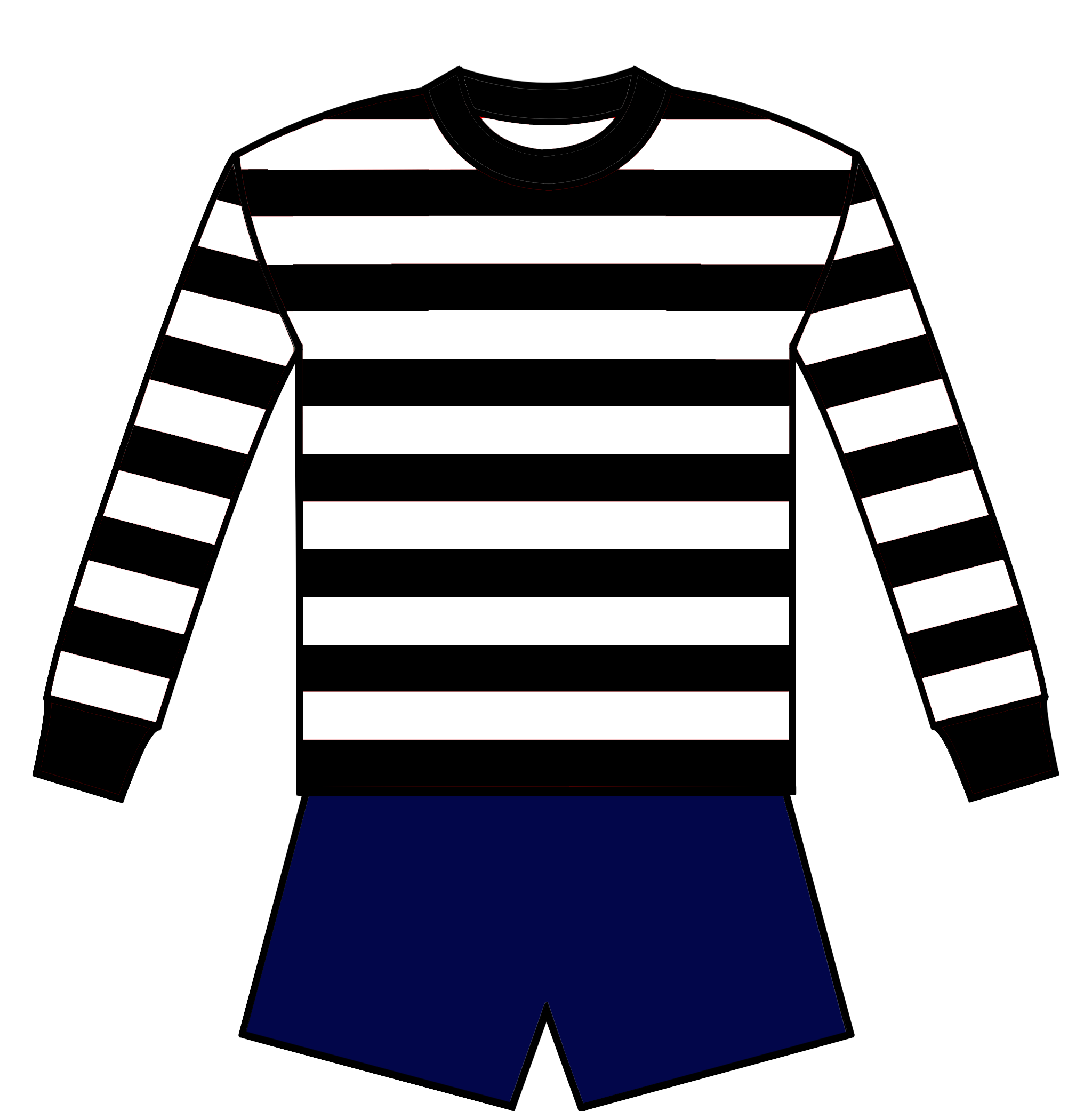
Western Suburbs; 5th season Ground: Pratten Park; Captain-Coach: Tedda Courtney

== Ladder ==
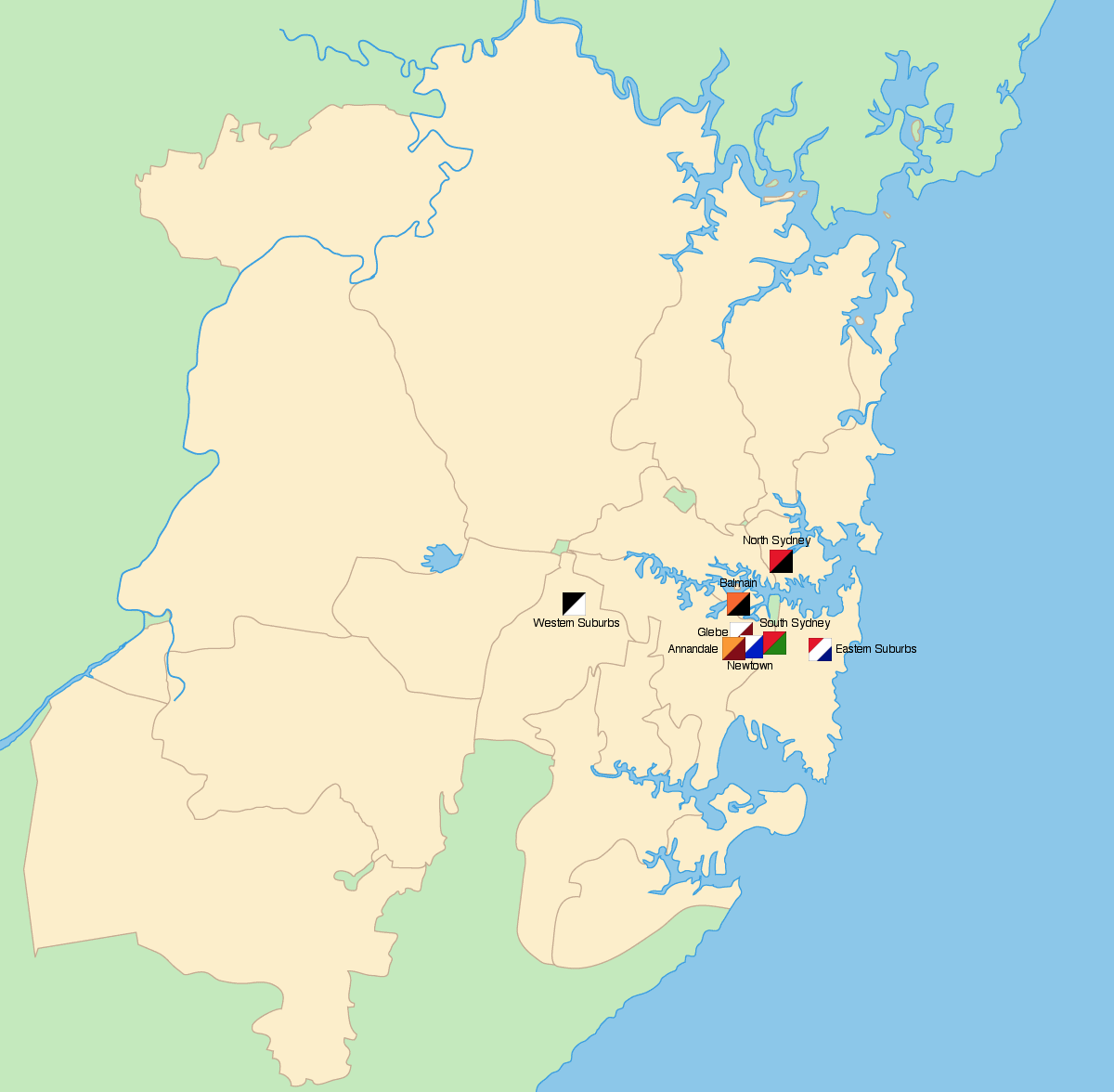
The geographical locations of the teams that contested the 1912 premiership across Sydney.

	Team	Pld	W	D	L	PF	PA	PD	Pts
1	Eastern Suburbs	14	13	0	1	230	86	+144	26
2	Glebe	14	11	0	3	199	83	+116	22
3	Newtown	14	9	0	5	176	132	+44	18
4	South Sydney	14	8	0	6	207	135	+72	16
5	Balmain	14	6	0	8	138	168	-30	12
6	North Sydney	14	6	0	8	124	197	-73	12
7	Annandale	14	2	0	12	86	134	-48	4
8	Western Suburbs	14	1	0	13	100	325	-225	2

== Premiers ==
Eastern Suburbs won the premiership when they beat Norths at North Sydney Oval 15–10 on 17 August. The premiership squad was:

- A Allen
- Tom Bruce
- JD Campbell
- Harold Corbett
- Barney Dalton
- W Dalton
- Dan Frawley
- Mick Frawley
- Eddie Griffiths
- Arthur Halloway
- Fred Kinghorn
- Charlie Lees
- Dally Messenger
- Wally Messenger
- Larry O'Malley
- Sandy Pearce
- W Smith
- Eddie White
- Percy White
- Bob Williams
