= 1911 NSWRFL season =

Rugby league competition

- League: New South Wales Rugby Football League
- Duration: April 29 to September 16
- Teams: 8
- Matches played: 59
- Points scored: 1374
- Premiers: Eastern Suburbs (1st title)
- Minor Premiers: Glebe (1st title)
- Runners-up: Glebe
- Wooden spoon: Balmain (1st spoon)
- Top point-scorer(s): Dally Messenger (148)
- Top try-scorer(s): Dave Garlick (13)

Second Grade
- Number of teams: 16
- Premiers: Eastern Suburbs
- Runners-up: Glebe

Third Grade
- Number of teams: 22
- Premiers: Leichhardt
- Runners-up: South Sydney Kinkora

The 1911 New South Wales Rugby Football League premiership was the fourth season of Sydney’s top-level rugby league club competition, Australia’s first. Eight teams from across the city contested during the season for the premiership and the Royal Agricultural Society Challenge Shield.

The League’s turnover for the 1911 season was £15,889, up £2,477 on the previous year.

== Teams ==
For the first time in its short history, the premiership consisted of the same teams for two consecutive seasons. The same eight teams from the 1910 season played in 1911.

- Annandale
- Balmain, formed on January 23, 1908, at Balmain Town Hall
- Eastern Suburbs, formed on January 24, 1908, at Paddington Town Hall
- Glebe, formed on January 9, 1908
- Newtown, formed on January 14, 1908
- North Sydney, formed on February 7, 1908, at the North Sydney School of Arts in Mount Street
- South Sydney, formed on January 17, 1908, at Redfern Town Hall
- Western Suburbs, formed on February 4, 1908

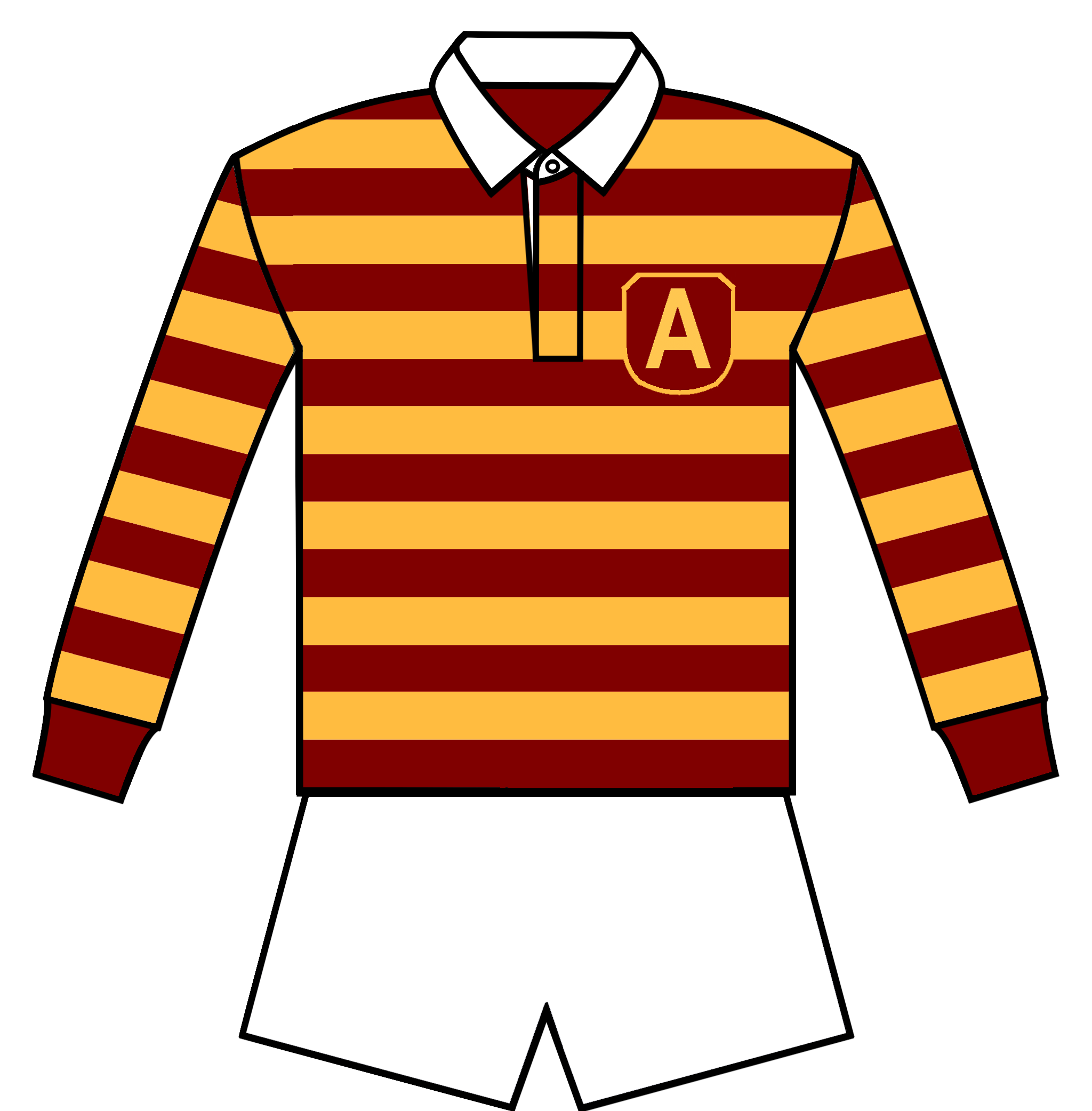
Annandale; 2nd season Ground: Wentworth Park; Captain-Coach: Charlie Hedley

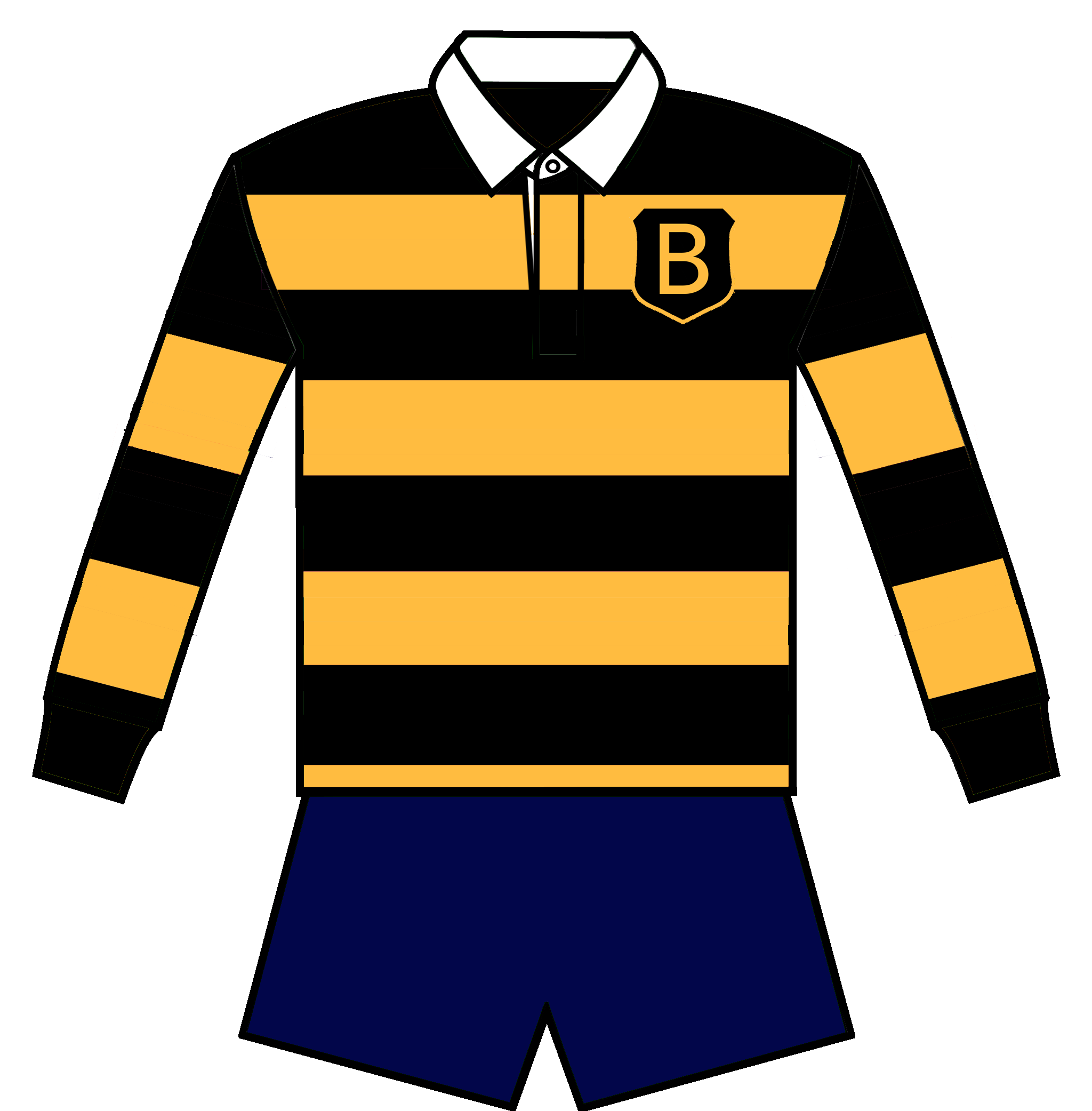
Balmain; 4th season Ground: Birchgrove Oval; Coach: Robert Graves; Captain: Arthur Halloway

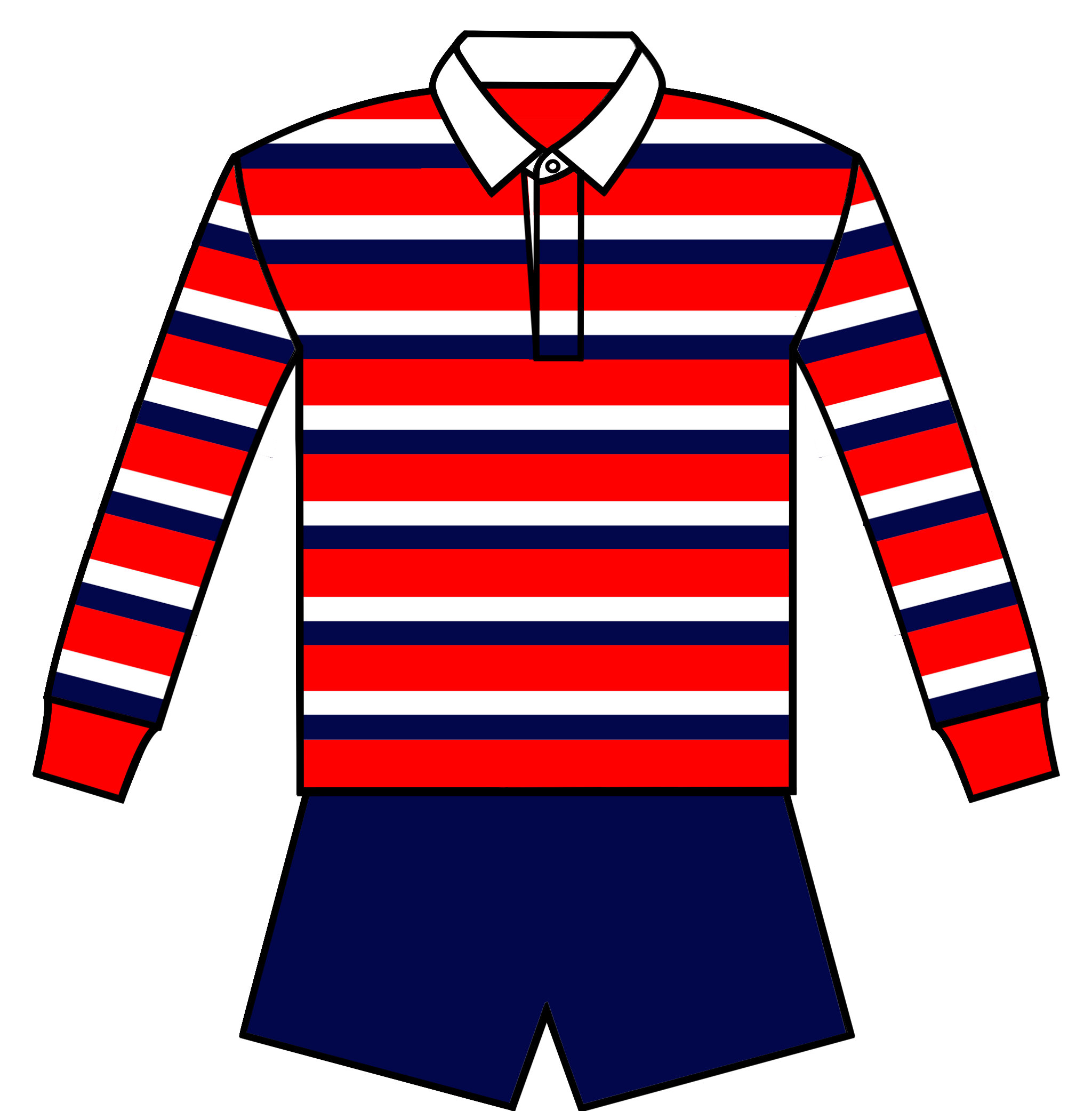
Eastern Suburbs; 4th season Ground: Sydney Sports Ground; Captain-Coach: Dally Messenger

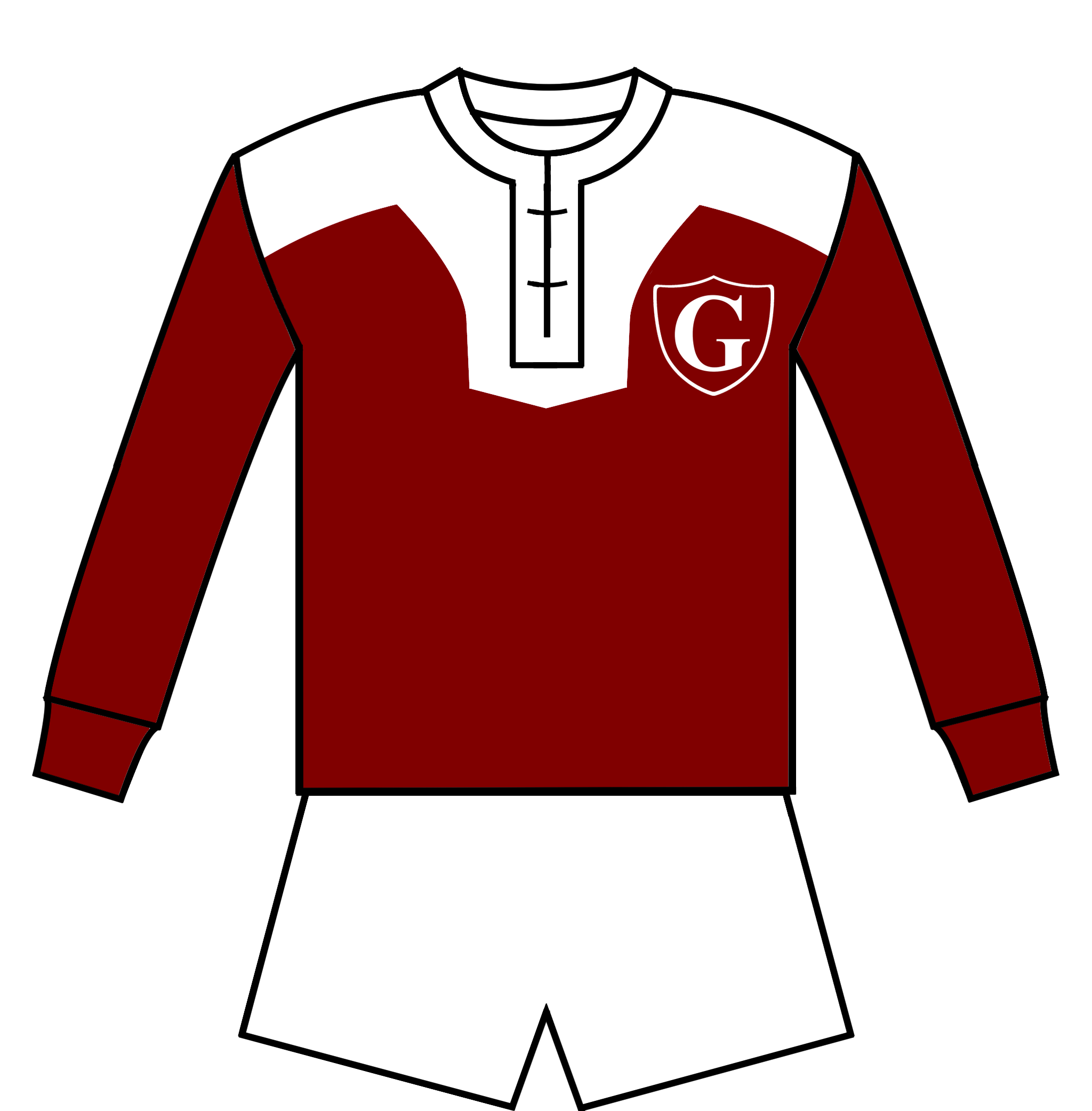
Glebe; 4th season Ground: Wentworth Park; Coach: Chris McKivat; Captain: Albert Burge

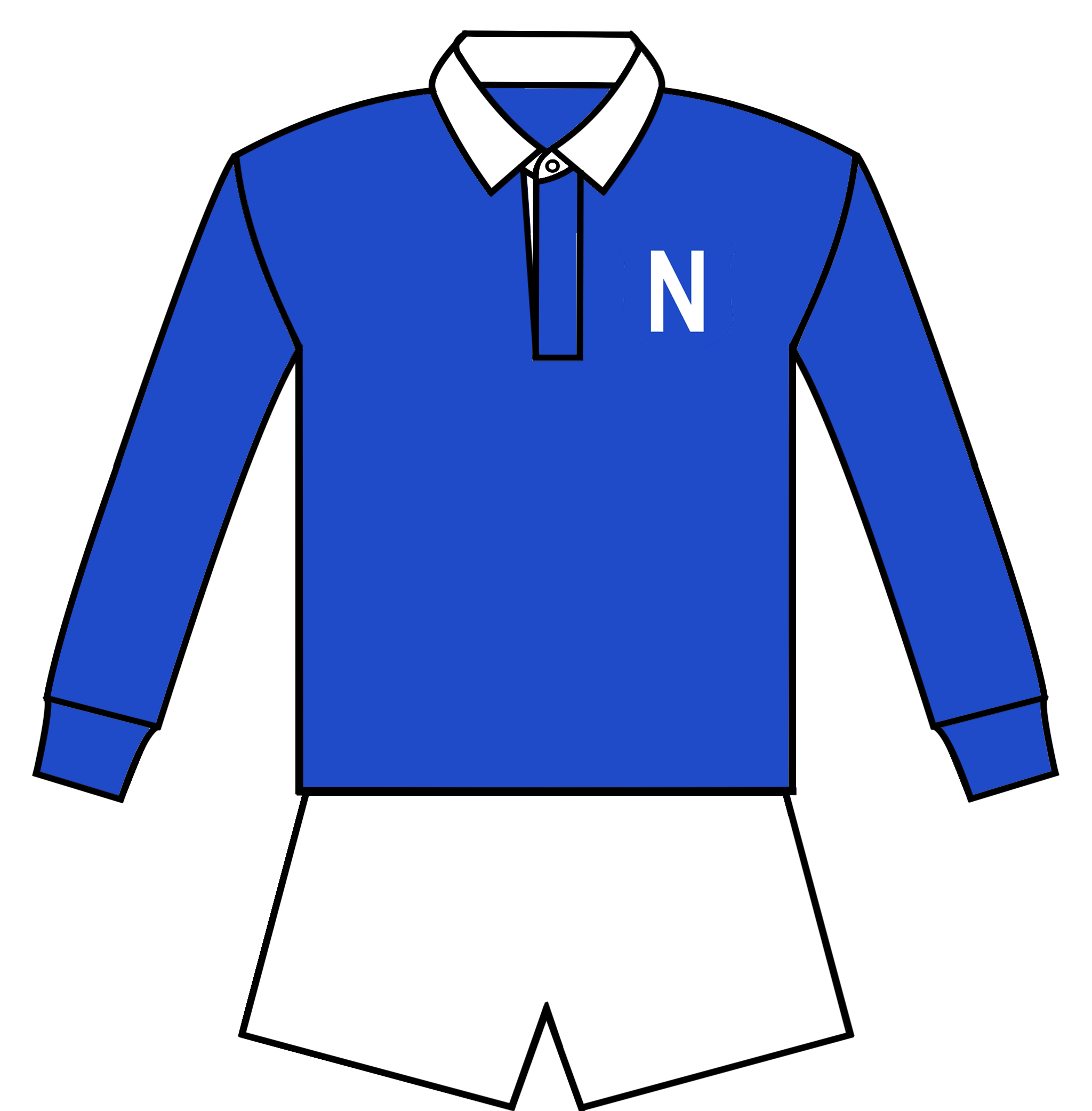
Newtown; 4th season Ground: Erskineville Oval; Coach: Captain: Bill Noble

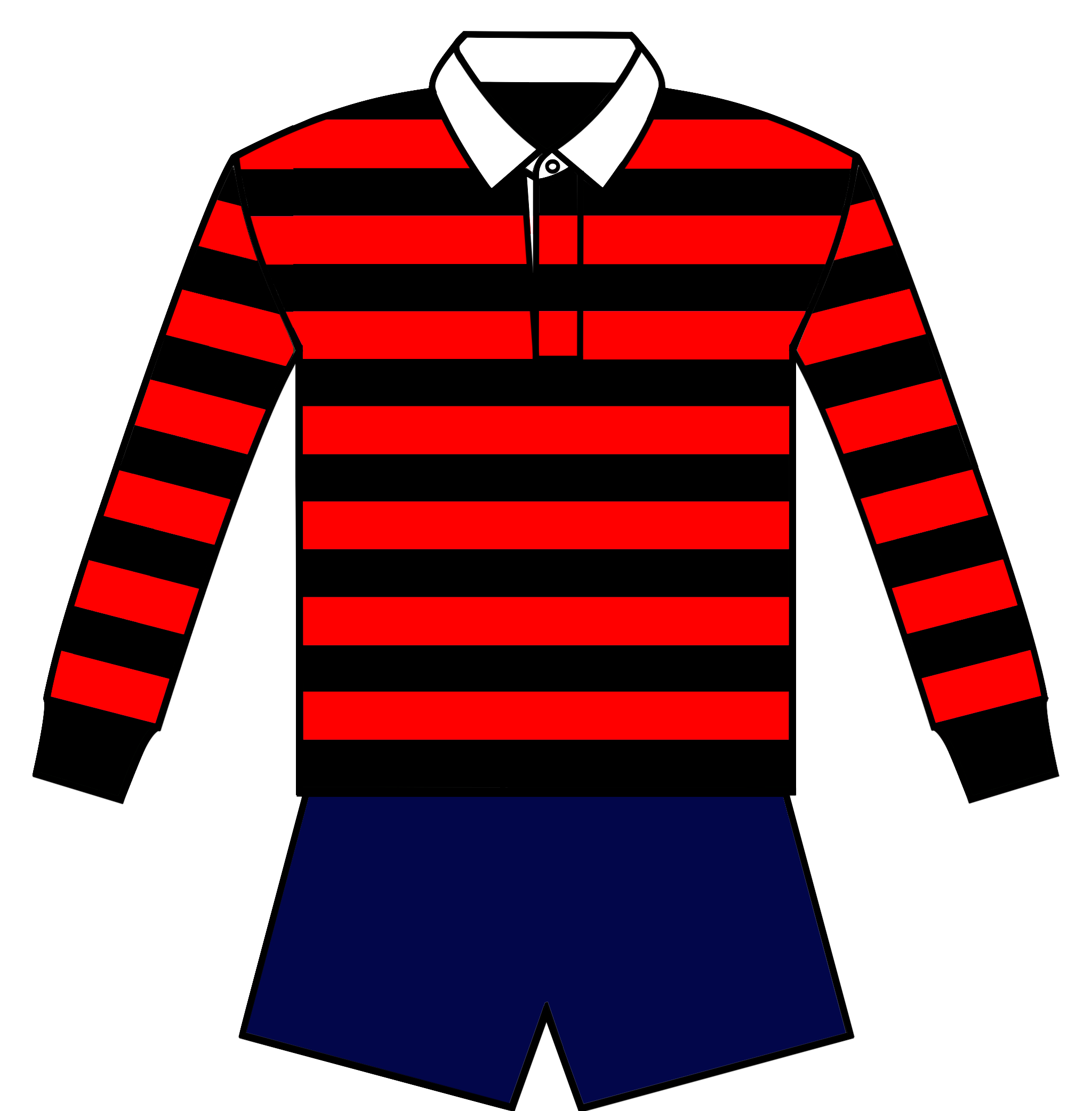
North Sydney; 4th season Ground: North Sydney Oval; Coach: Captain: Con Sullivan

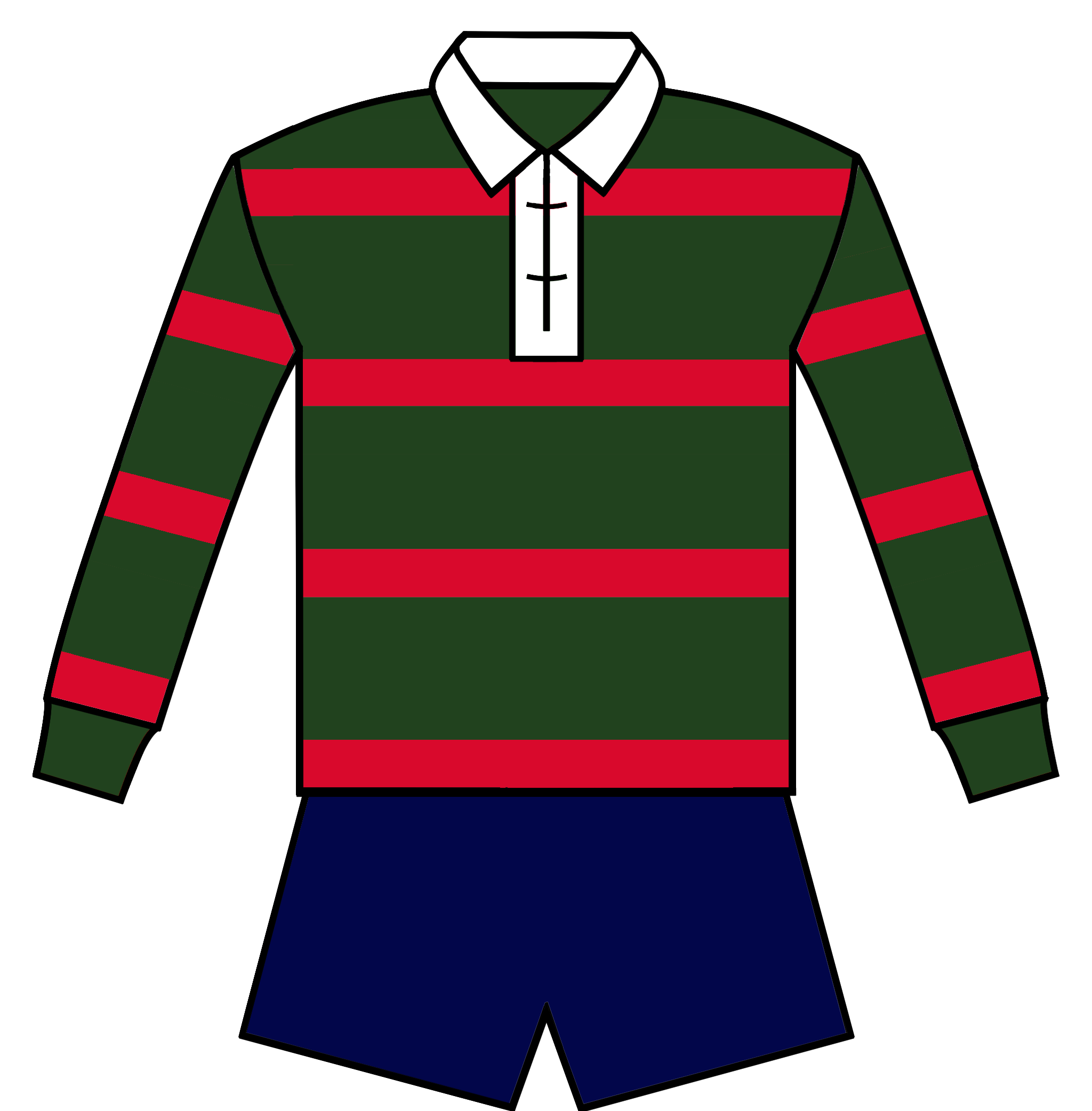
South Sydney; 4th season Ground:Sydney Sports Ground; Coach: Arthur Hennessy; Captain: Billy Cann

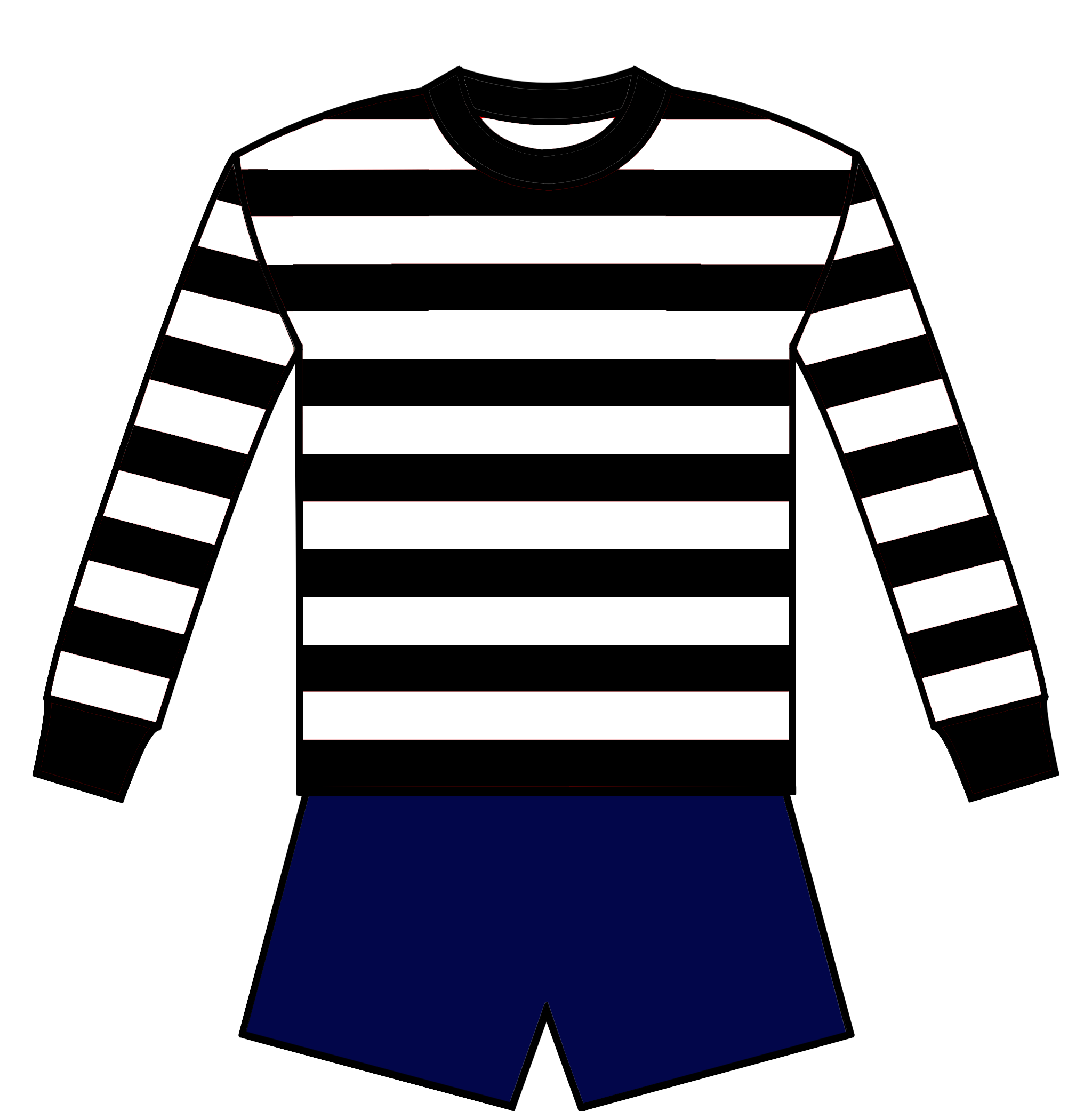
Western Suburbs; 4th season Ground: St Luke's Park; Coach: Captain: Tedda Courtney

== Ladder ==
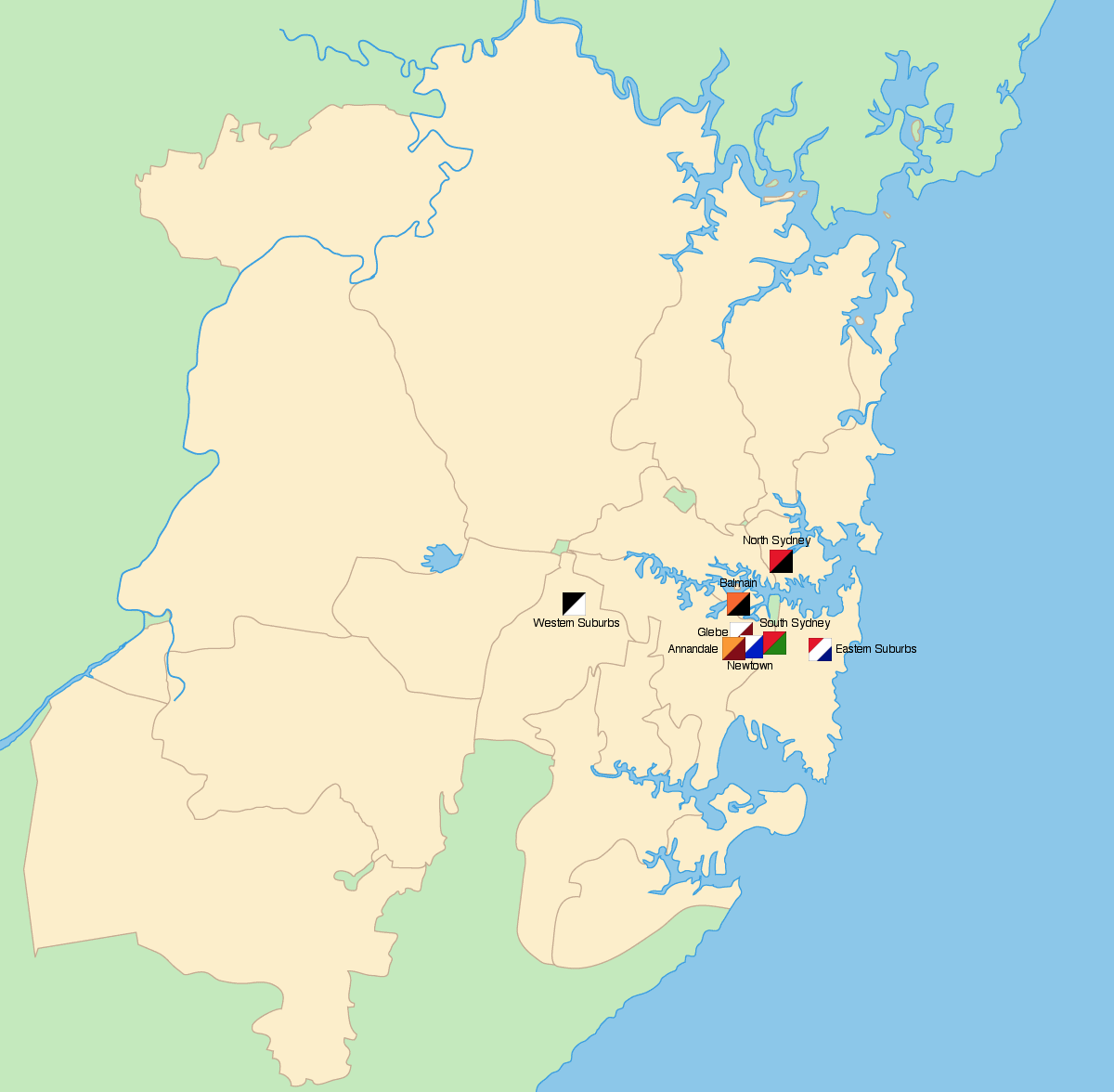
The geographical locations of the teams that contested the 1911 premiership across Sydney.

	Team	Pld	W	D	L	PF	PA	PD	Pts
1	Glebe	14	11	0	3	244	88	+156	22
2	Eastern Suburbs	14	9	2	3	208	129	+79	20
3	South Sydney	14	9	2	3	188	117	+71	20
4	Newtown	14	6	3	5	154	120	+34	15
5	Annandale	14	5	1	8	113	184	-71	11
6	North Sydney	14	4	1	9	138	209	-71	9
7	Western Suburbs	14	4	1	9	116	189	-73	9
8	Balmain	14	3	0	11	130	255	-125	6

== Finals ==
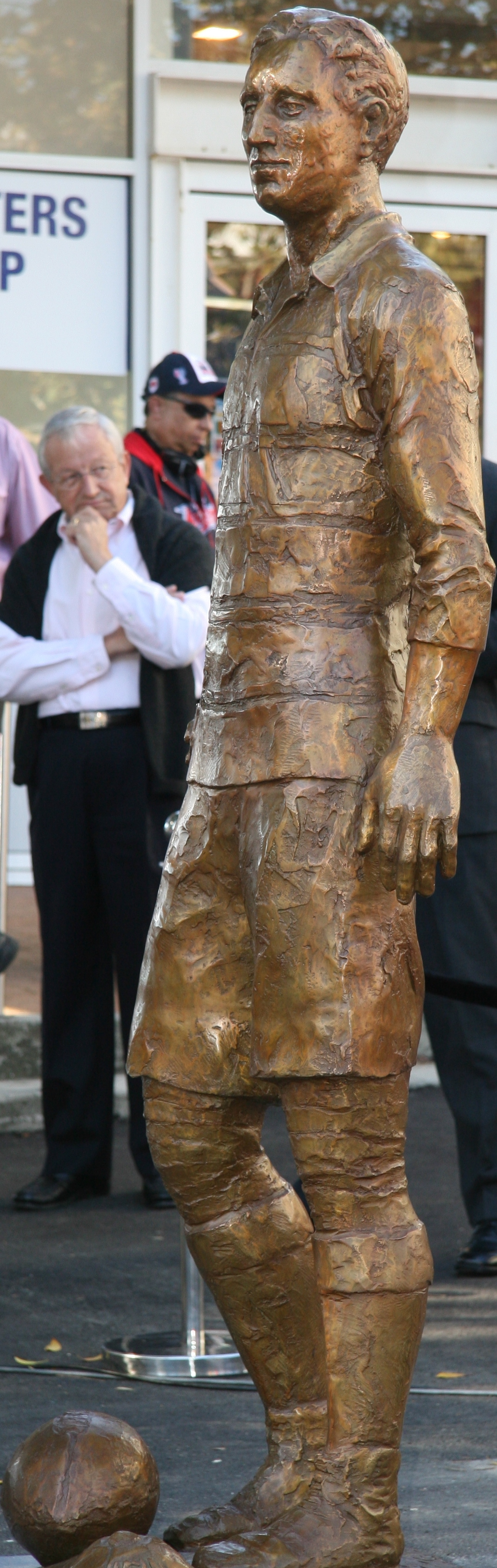
Sculpture-statue of Dally Messenger by Cathy Weiszmann

The finals system used for the 1910 season was similar in the 1911 season. The top two teams at the end of the year were to play each other in a final to decide the premiership, but in the event of the minor premiers losing, they were deemed to have the "right of challenge" to play a Grand Final. However, because both Eastern Suburbs and South Sydney finished on equal premiership points in second place, a playoff was used to decide who would play minor premiers Glebe in the final.

Eastern Suburbs ended up beating local rivals South Sydney 23-10 at the Sports Ground in front of 14,000 people on September 2, 1911, to win the play-off in order to play minor premiers Glebe. The following week, Eastern Suburbs beat Glebe in front of 16,000 at the Agricultural Ground 22-9. Glebe immediately exercised their right for a rematch the following week for a match to be held at the Agricultural Ground on September 16, 1911.

=== Final ===
Eastern Suburbs	Position	Glebe
Fred Kinghorn	FB	Roy Algie
Barney Dalton	WG	Mick Muggivan
John Campbell	CE	Dave Garlick
Dally Messenger (Ca./Co.)	CE	Tom Gleeson
Eddie White	WG	Charlie Cubitt
Herb Collins	FE	Les Cubitt
Leslie Cody	HB	Fritz Thiering
Larry O'Malley	PR	Sid Pert
Sandy Pearce	HK	Tony Redmond
Mick Frawley	PR	Sam Griffiths
Eddie Griffiths	SR	Albert Burge (c)
Charlie Lees	SR	Frank Burge
W Dalton	LK	Harry Brighton
	Reserve	J Farrelly
	Coach	Chris McKivat

After Glebe won the toss, Dally Messenger kicked off at 3:31pm on what was a very windy Saturday afternoon. Glebe winger Cubitt scored early and Easts were only able to post a penalty goal in the first half and trailed 5–2 at the break. The referee was Tom McMahon (the elder of the two Sydney top-grade referees of that name) who in the first half sent off Glebe’s Sid Pert and Rooster Larry O'Malley, the former Australian Kangaroo captain. Early in the second half, Cubitt scored again for Glebe to take an 8–4 lead. However, in the final ten minutes, Eastern Suburbs were able to score a try after a high kick was misjudged by the Glebe fullback, and Charlie Lees took the loose ball to score a try. Dally Messenger converted to take the lead 9–8 with only minutes to play, and consolidated the win with another penalty kick to win the game 11–8 for the Roosters and allowing them to take their first premiership in front of 20,000 people.

Played in blustery conditions, Glebe’s form improved greatly but they could not compete with the immaculate kicking of Dally Messenger.

In an incident-packed opening stanza McMahon reduced each side to twelve men by sending off O'Malley and Sid Pert after a touch judge's report. Ensuing scrums were played with only four forwards. Glebe three-quarter Tom Gleeson left the field with an ankle injury and was replaced at half time by Farrelly.

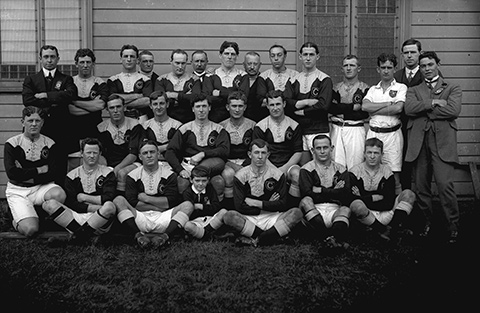
Glebe RLC 1911 McKivat (centre with ball), flanked by R Algie left F Burge right

With first use of the stiff southerly, Glebe winger C.R. Cubitt scored out wide in the second minute from a scrum close to the Easts line. Messenger replied with a goal shortly after for Glebe to lead 5–2 at halftime. When play resumed, Messenger scored a goal again to narrow the gap to one point. Twelve minutes in, Glebe edged to an 8–4 lead when Cubitt crossed for his second try: a brilliant length of the field effort featuring Farrelly, Redmond, Alby Burge and finally Cubitt who beat Messenger's ankle tap.

With thirteen minutes left in the grand final, Lees scored Easts’ only try, from a high kick. The ball bounced off dazed Glebe fullback “Bunny” Algie (who had been injured in a headclash in the opening minutes with winger White). Messenger converted and Easts snatched a 9–8 lead. Messenger's field goal six minutes from the bell gave his team the three point buffer at 11–8 and the confidence to hang on and win their first premiership. After exchanging jerseys, the elated surfsiders carried Messenger from the field".

— Haddon, Steve, "History of the NSWRL Finals"

Eastern Suburbs 11 (Tries: Lees. Goals: Messenger 3. Fld Goal: Messenger )

defeated

Glebe 8 (Tries; C Cubitt 2 Goals: 1.)

== Notable events ==
On June 22, the Sydney Cricket Ground staged its first game of rugby league. NSW defeated New Zealand in the match, 35–10.
