= Fred Kinghorn =

Australian rugby league footballer

Personal information
- Full name: Frederick John Kinghorn
- Born: 1883 Orange, New South Wales
- Died: 13 November 1971 (aged 87–88) Darlinghurst, New South Wales

Playing information
- Position: Fullback
Club
Years	Team	Pld	T	G	FG	P
1911–14	Eastern Suburbs	41	3	6	1	22
Representative
Years	Team	Pld	T	G	FG	P
1913	New South Wales	5	0	0	0	0
1912	Metropolis	1	0	0	0	0

Frederick John Kinghorn (1883–1971), A pioneer rugby league footballer, Kinghorn played for the Eastern Suburbs club in the New South Wales Rugby League competition.

== Biography ==
Kinghorn who played 41 matches for Eastern Suburbs side was a member of the club's first premiership winning sides in the years 1911, 1912 and 1913. Kinghorn was also a member of Easts City Cup winning side of 1914. In the 1912 season the fullback represented Sydney, and in 1913 was selected for NSW in an interstate match against Queensland.

Following his retirement from the game Fred Kinghorn became a vice president of the Eastern Suburbs club in 1935.

Kinghorn died in 1971, aged 88.
