= Dally Messenger =

Australia & NZ international rugby league footballer (1883–1959)

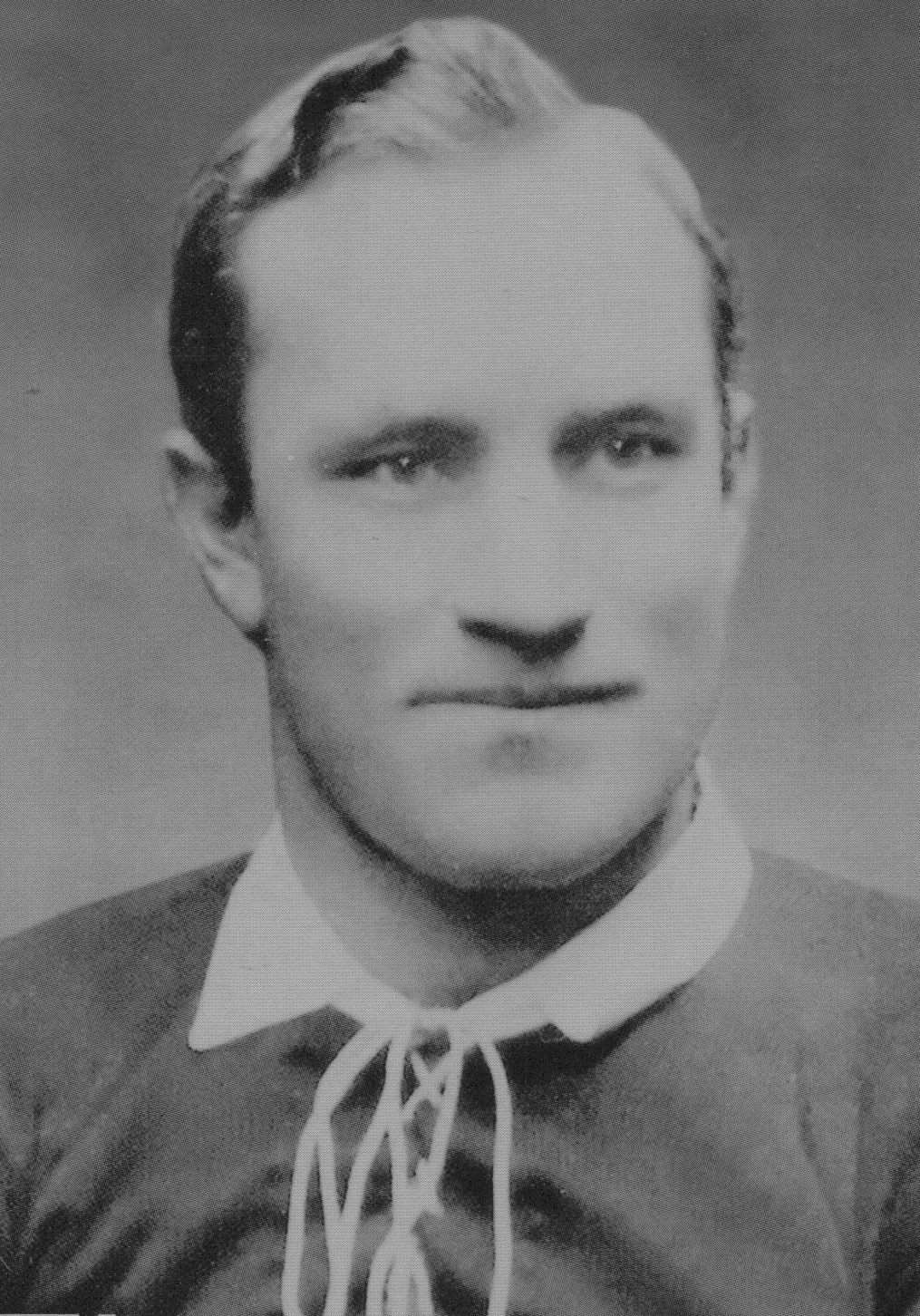
- Messenger in 1907

Personal information
- Full name: Herbert Henry Messenger
- Born: 12 April 1883 Balmain, New South Wales, Australia
- Died: 24 November 1959 (aged 76) Gunnedah, New South Wales, Australia

Playing information
- Height: 5 ft 7.5 in (171.5 cm)
- Weight: 12 st (76 kg)

Rugby union
- Position: Wing, First five-eighth, Centre
Club
Years	Team	Pld	T	G	FG	P
1905–07	Eastern Suburbs	24	4	37	1	105
Representative
Years	Team	Pld	T	G	FG	P
1906–07	Sydney	3	0	4	0	11
1906–07	New South Wales	13	5	14	0	46
1907	Australia	2	1	2	0	7

Rugby league
- Position: Centre
Club
Years	Team	Pld	T	G	FG	P
1908–13	Eastern Suburbs	48	21	159	0	381
Representative
Years	Team	Pld	T	G	FG	P
1907–12	New South Wales	26	21	120	0	308
1908	New Zealand	2	1	0	0	3
1908–10	Australia	9	5	23	0	59
1908	Queensland	1	1	3	0	9
1908–12	City NSW	6	5	29	0	73
- Relatives: Wally Messenger (brother)

Herbert Henry "Dally" Messenger (12 April 1883 – 24 November 1959) was an Australian rugby league and rugby union footballer. One of Australia's first professional rugby footballers, he is recognised as one of the greatest-ever players in either code. He played for New South Wales in the first match run by the newly-created New South Wales Rugby Football League, which had just split away from the established New South Wales Rugby Football Union.

Sometimes nicknamed "The Master", Messenger had a stocky build, and while standing only about 172 centimetres (5 ft 8 in) in height, he was a powerful runner of the ball and a solid defender. According to his peers, the centre's greatest attributes were his unpredictability and astonishing physical co-ordination, coupled with an ability to kick goals from almost any part of the ground. He was a teetotaller and non-smoker during his career and other than breakfast, Messenger would rarely eat before a match.

== Early life ==
Messenger was born in the Sydney waterfront suburb of Balmain, New South Wales, and grew up on the southern shores of Sydney Harbour at Double Bay, where his English-born father, Charles Amos Messenger, a champion sculler, owned a boat shed.

Dally's grandfather James Messenger was barge-master to Queen Victoria on the River Thames, world champion sculler (1854-57) and a highly regarded boat-builder, including the Lady Alice for Henry Morton Stanley's second African expedition.

As a boy Messenger also spent some time living with an aunt in South Melbourne, Victoria where he attended the Albert Park Public School. It was there he recalled playing Australian Rules Football. He credited skills he learned at Albert Park as contributing to his later success at Rugby Union and Rugby League. Dally was one of eight children. His younger brother by seven years, Walter (Wally) also became an Australian representative rugby league footballer.

In Sydney, Messenger attended Double Bay Public School in the city's eastern suburbs. It was here that he initially honed his rugby skills, while also playing cricket and indulging in his other great sporting love, sailing. Messenger worked, too, at his father's boat shed. By this juncture, he had gained the nickname of "Dally". It derived from a prominent politician of the 1880s, the then Attorney-General of New South Wales, William Bede Dalley, whose most conspicuous physical feature was a splendid pot belly – an anatomical augmentation that Herbert Henry Messenger happened to boast, too, when he was a small child. Fortunately, little Herbert Henry shed his pot belly as he grew older, together with the "e" from the spelling of his nickname.

== Rugby union ==
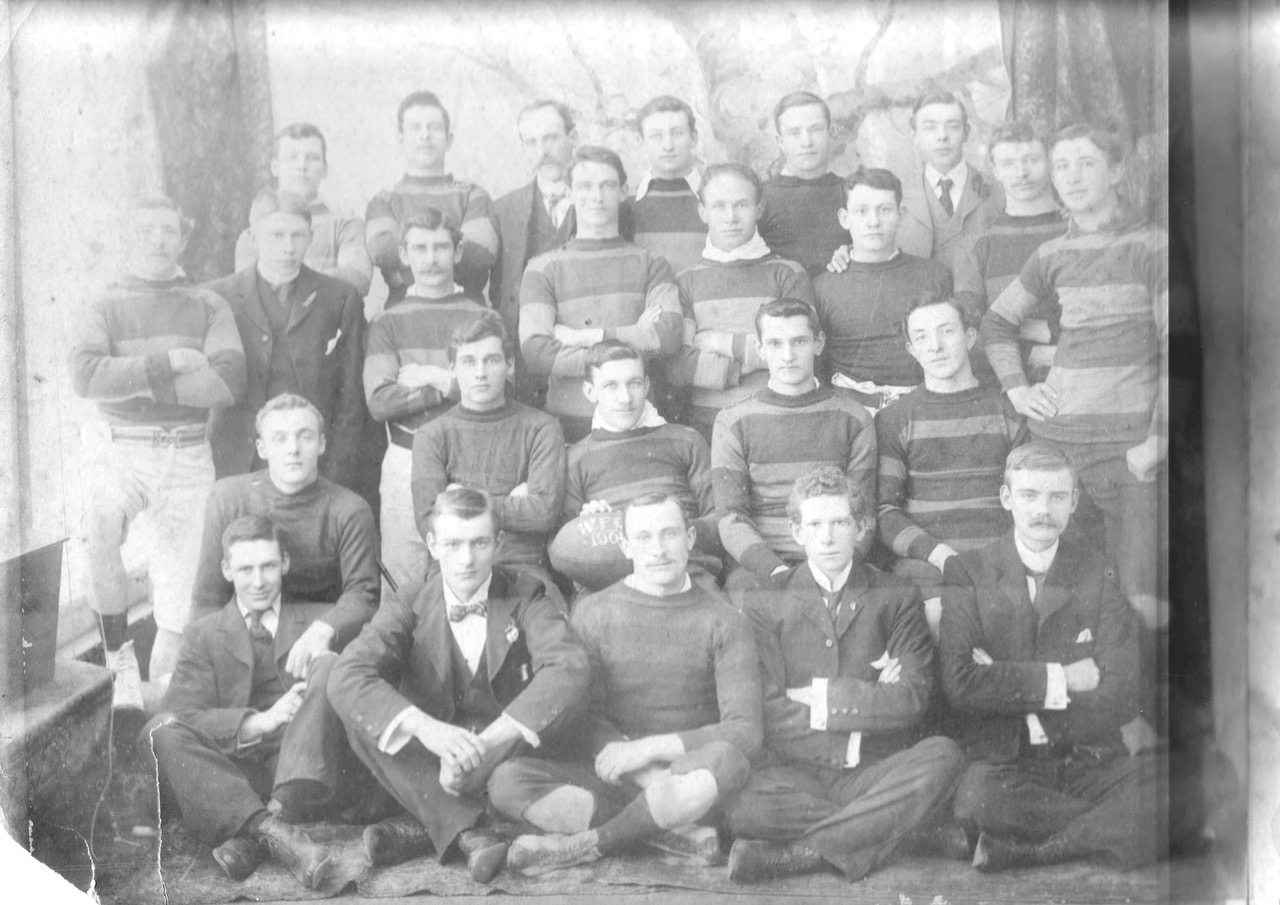
Messenger in the Double Bay Warrigals Rugby Union Football Club

Messenger first took up competitive rugby in 1900, playing for a local rugby union club called the Warrigals in a semi-social club competition. Over the next few years Messenger continued to play with the Warrigals, persistently rejecting calls by officials of the Eastern Suburbs RUFC to move up to the higher standard of Sydney's grade competition. In 1904. aged 21, Messenger played no football at all. He decided to spend this year working for the Messenger family boatbuilding business in Double Bay.

In 1905 Messenger began playing for Easts in the club's second-grade team, but showed sufficient promise to earn promotion to the first-grade side on two occasions that season. In that same season, he also purportedly played Australian rules football club in a number of first-grade matches in the Sydney competition.

Messenger began the 1906 season in first grade with Easts as a 'standoff' (five-eighth). He swiftly won a following amongst the club's supporters due to his mesmeric ball skills, cheeky tricks, blistering acceleration and accurate short- and long-kicking game off either foot. Messenger moved to what would become his customary position of centre following his selection there for the New South Wales team in 1906. By the time of his Wallaby debut in 1907, he had made that position his own.

In his book Viewless Winds, the 1906 representative footballer Paddy Moran wrote that Messenger's play "was full of surprises, unorthodox, flash" and "directed largely by the unconscious mind". He said that Messenger "never became a slave to copybook practices" because his "instinct enabled him to see and take an opening in that operative second which is all-important". Moran compared him to Bradman in terms of their mutual ability to instantaneously co-ordinate their bodies into the right position in apparently ample time before the ball would arrive.

When talk of a professional rugby competition, or a Rugby League aligned with the 1895-founded Northern Rugby Union in England, was being aired, Messenger was instantly interested by the development. He was approached by a consortium that included Test cricketer, Victor Trumper with friend J. J. Giltinan, who knew getting Messenger on board would be a major boost for the new code. Messenger was star attraction in a NSW Waratahs match against New Zealand All Blacks that drew an enormous crowd of 52,000, which as the highest attendance and gate-takings ever yet seen in any cricket or football (of any code) match in Australia, created further debate about the rugby union players not receiving any remuneration. Messenger signed on with the new professional code on Sunday 11 August 1907. As the premier rugby footballer of the time, Messenger's signing is considered an integral moment in the foundation of rugby league.

Upon signing he became a professional rugby league footballer, leading to Messenger being disqualified by the New South Wales Rugby Union and his name was struck from their record books, until being restored 100 years later.

== Rugby league with the New Zealand "All Golds", 1907-08 ==
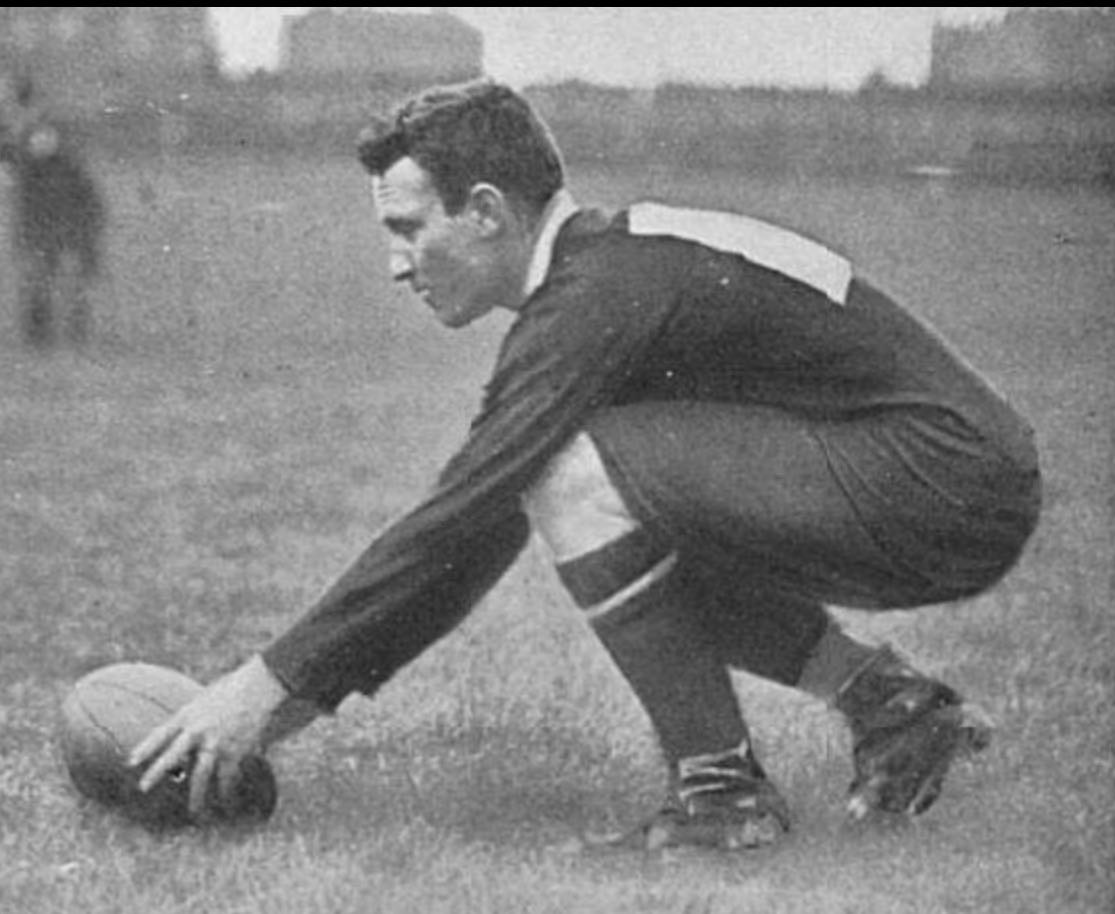
Messenger in Bramley, England, during the 1907-08 All Blacks (All Golds) tour

Messenger played in the rebel series against a professional New Zealand team, the 'All Golds' as they were referred to, and was invited to tour England with the New Zealand professional side. It remains unclear whether this was a result of the form he showed in the series or if it had been agreed on as part of his sign-on fee with the new code. It was said, and believed as Messenger family folklore for years, that the signing of Messenger to rugby league was negotiated with Messenger's mother Annie, and the promised amount for playing, at first, in three All Golds' games, was 50 pounds (based on increases in average earnings, this would be approximately £18,210 in 2015).

In the North of England, Messenger became more acquainted with the new game. By the completion of the tour Messenger had topped the tour aggregates by more than 100 points.

== The 1908 inaugural rugby league season ==
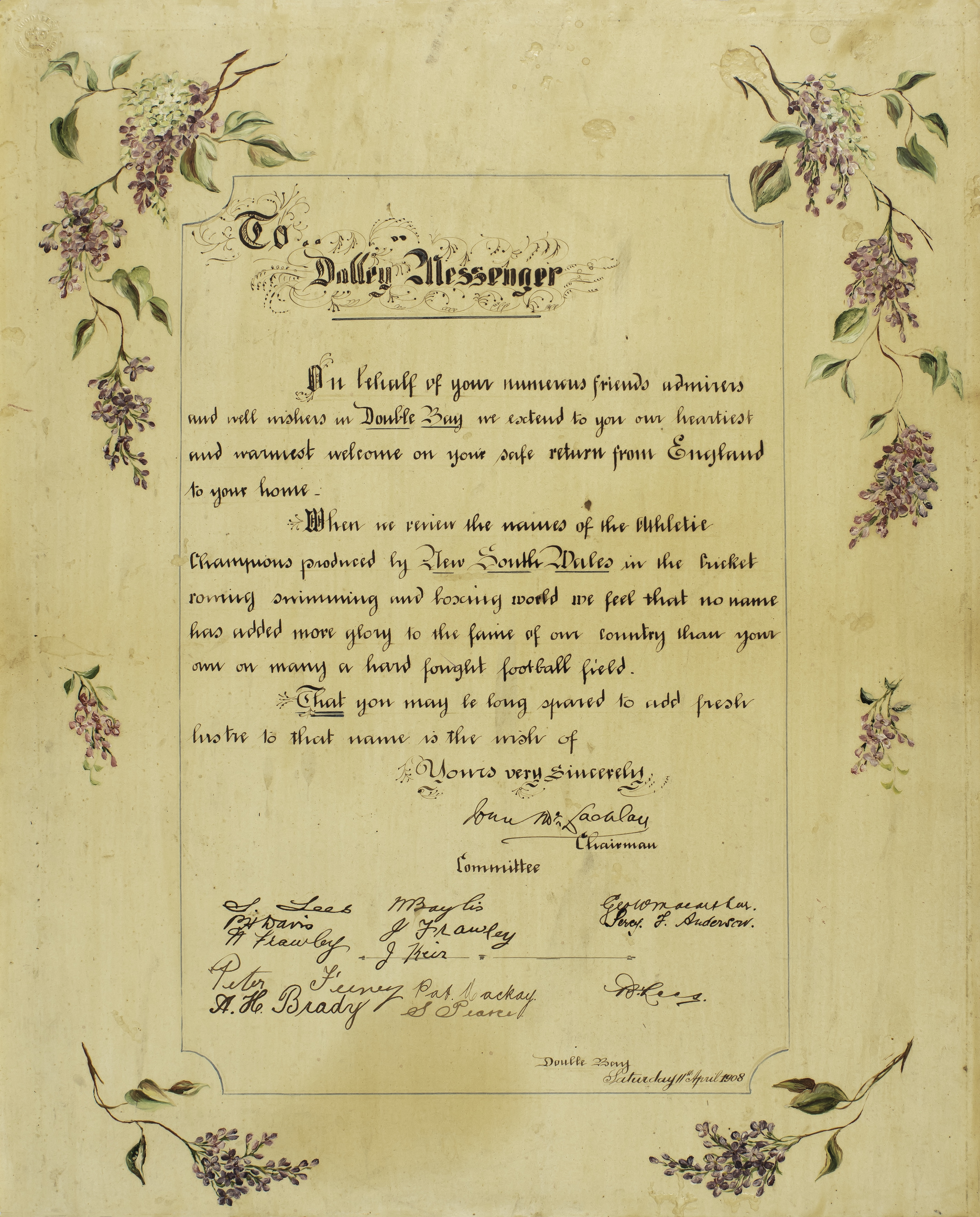
Messenger 1908 Civic Reception Scroll. It says: "When we review the names of the Athletic Champions produced by New South Wales in the cricket, rowing, swimming and boxing world we feel that no name has added more glory to the fame of our country than your own".

On arrival back in Australia, Messenger played with the Eastern Suburbs club of the newly formed New South Wales Rugby Football League (NSWRFL), although a heavy representative schedule saw him play only a handful of matches for the club. Messenger's popularity helped showcase the new game and the NSWRFL took full advantage of this. He was selected to play in the first ever trans-Tasman test, which was the debut match of the Australia national rugby league team. In rugby league's first year, besides playing for his club, Messenger made representative appearances for Metropolis (Sydney), New South Wales and Australia, as well as for New Zealand and, in one case, Queensland, he also represented Australasia. Following two heavy defeats, Messenger agreed to play for Queensland in a third match against New Zealand. The match ended in a 22–22 draw, with Messenger scoring nine points.

The 1908 Interstate rugby league series saw the first ever match between New South Wales and Queensland and Messenger scored a goal for the Blues in their 43-0 victory over the Maroons in Sydney. During the 1908 New Zealand Māori rugby league tour of Australia Messenger was selected to play for New South Wales and Sydney against the tourists.

== The Pioneer Kangaroos 1908-1909 ==
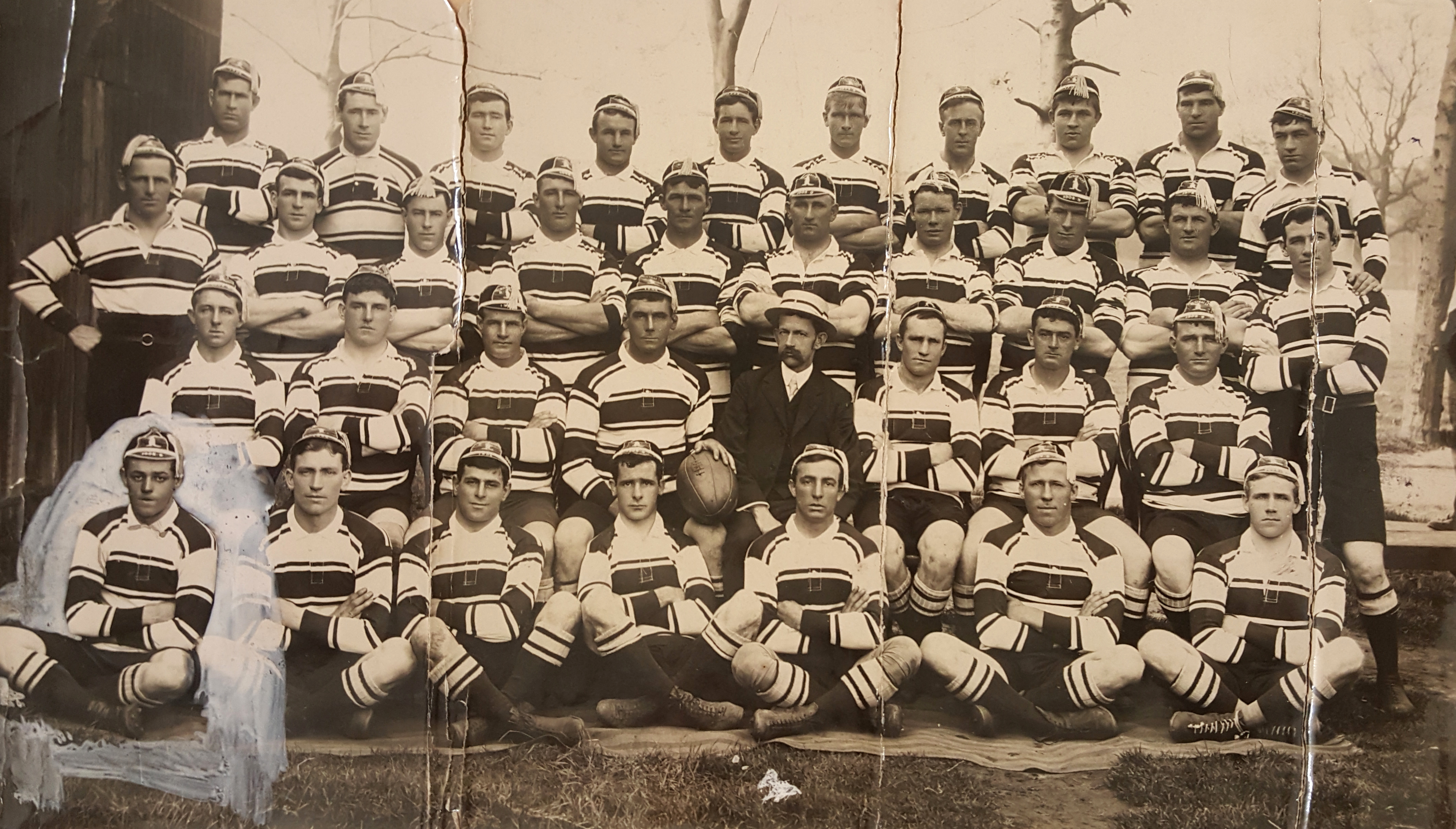
Messenger is seated right of Giltinan (in suit), Pioneer Kangaroos 1908–09

Towards the end of the 1908 season Messenger was again selected to tour England, this time with the first Kangaroos, or 'Pioneers'. He is listed on the Australian Players Register as Kangaroo No. 10.

Having toured with the New Zealand professional team the previous year, Messenger was well known in the North of England and on arrival attained celebrity status. Placards bearing the words 'Messenger Will Play' were erected outside of grounds. Messenger was offered contracts by leading association football clubs, including Celtic, Newcastle United and Tottenham Hotspur, but refused them.

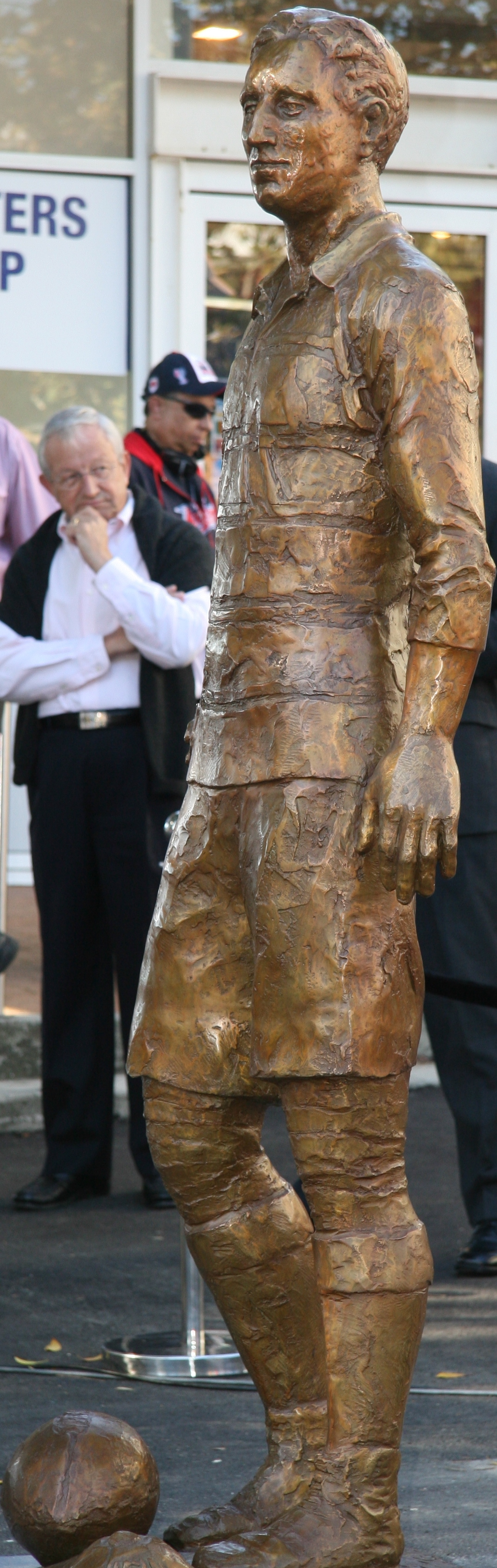
Sculpture-statue of Messenger by Cathy Weiszmann, commissioned by Basil Sellers, stands outside the Sydney Football Stadium

Messenger captained Australia in the first two tests of the tour, missing the third through a knee injury incurred after regular field goal attempts. On tour Messenger was credited with numerous goals from the other side of half way, including one from the sideline on his own 25-yard line that appeared in earlier versions of the 'Guinness Book of World Records' as measuring over 80 yards (73m). Another from over 75 yards is mentioned in an English newspaper under the heading 'A Wonderful Kick' ".

" Quite a sensation was caused at last Saturday's football match when Mr Messenger kicked the ball from the 75 yards' mark and secured a goal....."

In the second test Messenger is said to have scored one of the greatest individual tries ever witnessed in Test rugby league. At the end of the tour Messenger had again topped the aggregates, this time by just under 100 points.

== Club season 1909 ==
Returning home from the tour with injury and following a hectic schedule over the past few years, he elected to sit out most of the 1909 NSWRFL season, playing in just a few representative matches towards the end of the year. Messenger also rejected an offer to play with English club, Warrington, during the Australian off-season that year. Messenger was captain of Australia when they hosted the 1910 Great Britain Lions tourists.

== Club Seasons 1910-1913 ==
The 1911 season has been acclaimed as Messenger's greatest. In 21 matches played he amassed a then record total of 270 points. In one interstate match for NSW he scored 32 points (from four tries and 10 goals). That record has only been equalled in recent years, with tries now being worth 4 points as opposed to 3. He amassed a total of 72 points for the three match series.

The Coronation of King George V took place on Thursday, June 22, 1911. There were festivities all around Australia. The prevailing mood at the time was one of kindness, and the Sydney Cricket Ground hosted the first Rugby League match there between New South Wales and New Zealand. Dally became the first captain to lead a Rugby League side onto the SCG as he led his team onto this holy ground.

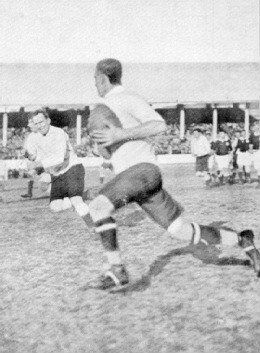
Messenger inside Dan Frawley in action for NSW v Qld 1912

Recently married Messenger stood down from the 1911–12 Kangaroo tour of Great Britain, leading his club Eastern Suburbs to its first premiership. In the semi-final that year against South Sydney Messenger scored 20 of Easts' 23 points. For each of the three consecutive seasons 1910, 1911 and 1912, he was the NSWRFL's top point scorer. In 1911 he overtook Arthur Conlin's record for the most points scored in an NSWRFL (101); Messenger's eventual total of 379 stood as the new career record until it was bettered by Harold Horder in 1918.

After retirement from representative football, he led his side to a second premiership in 1912 and followed that with a third consecutive premiership in 1913. Easts were given permanent possession of the NSWRFL's first trophy, the Royal Agricultural Society Shield. On announcement of his retirement, the Eastern Suburbs club presented the shield to Messenger in appreciation.

=== Career Postscripts 1914 ===
He was awarded Life Membership of the New South Wales Rugby League in 1914.

In July 1914, just before the World War I began, Dally was persuaded to come out of retirement to enter "The Kicking championship of the Commonwealth" sponsored by the Australian Rules administrators. This was knockout competition from all states ending in a final between Dally and Herbert Lim. Kicks between the posts from 45 yards out along the touchline and a fifty yard kick from the centre. Dally won this accuracy section.

In the longest kick section Dally was up against the giant champion, Dave McNamara, from the Essendon and St Kilda teams in Melbourne. McNamara kicked 67 yards (61+ metres) from boot to landing point. Dally, although he had kicked many longer distances in his playing career could not quite make it on the day.

== Life after football ==
In addition to his rugby prowess, Messenger was a talented cricketer, canoeist and sailor. After the end of his rugby league career, he ran a couple of hotels in Sydney (Albion Park Hotel, cnr Market and Elizabeth Streets) and in Manilla (The Royal Hotel), and a banana plantation in Mount Buderim, Queensland. He later worked as a carpenter in the NSW Department of Public Works.

None of his various business opportunities proved to be successful. In his later years, he lived in the New South Wales Rugby League's club in Phillip Street. It was reported in the press that Messenger had suffered a heart attack on 18 November 1959 and he died in Gunnedah six days later. His body was returned to Sydney for a large funeral and was buried on 26 November 1959 at the Eastern Suburbs Memorial Park : Anglican section FM DDD - Grave 321

== Accolades ==
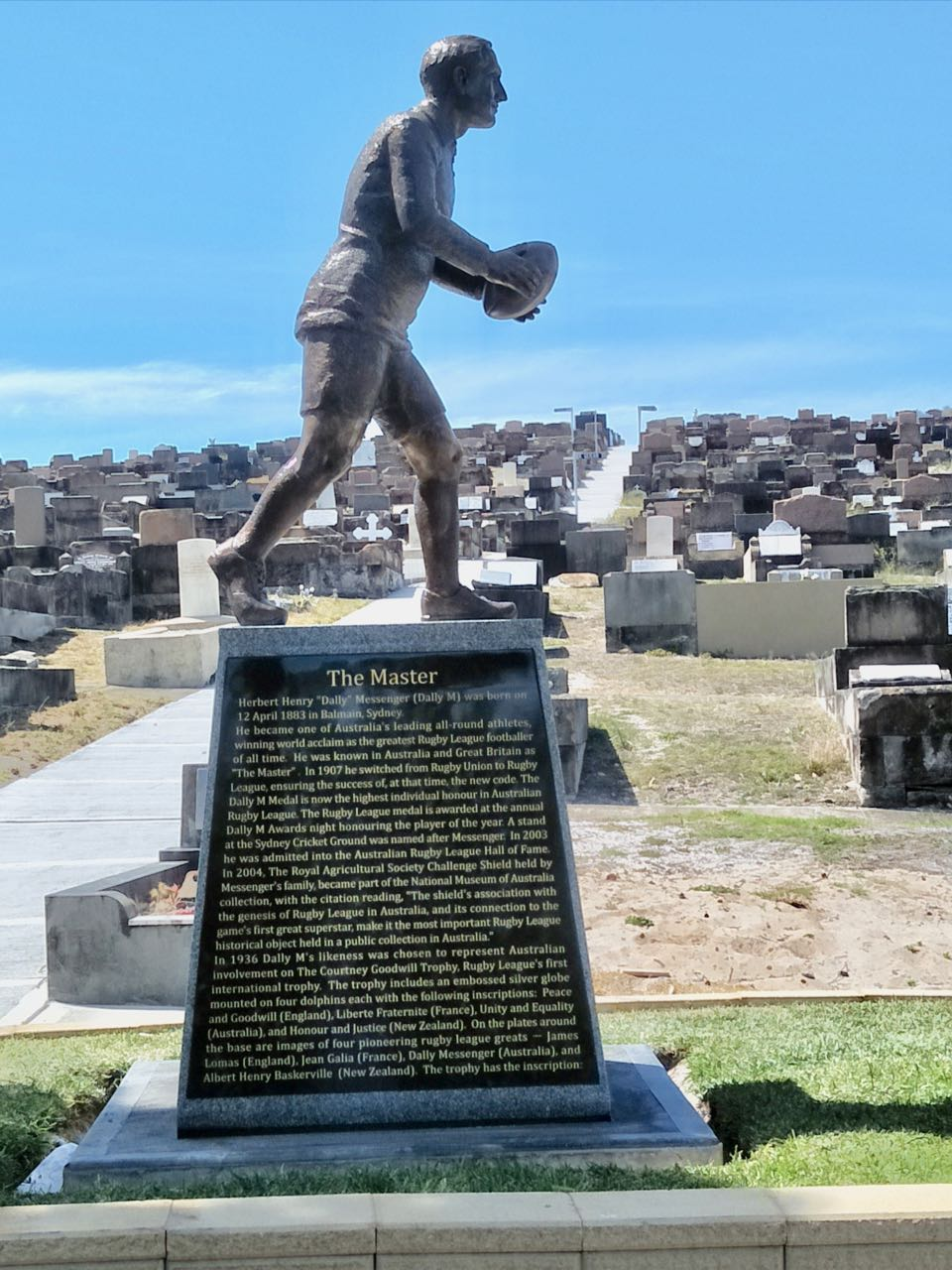
Messenger, pioneer superstar of Rugby Union and Rugby League, honoured with a statue and historical inscription at Eastern Suburbs Memorial Park in Sydney.

=== Courtney Goodwill Trophy ===
The Courtney Goodwill Trophy, international rugby league's first trophy, was presented initially in 1936 and depicted Messenger, along with three other pioneering greats of the code, namely Jean Galia (France), Albert Baskiville (New Zealand) and James Lomas (Britain).

=== Bicentenary "Heritage 200" list ===
In the 1988 Bicentenary year, "Heritage 200" listed the 200 people who had most contributed to the development of Australia since 1788, Dally Messenger was named and recognised for his contributions to Australian sport.

=== The Dally M Medal ===
The Dally M. Medal is awarded annually to Australian rugby league's best player, as judged by an expert panel of commentators, whose votes are tallied at the conclusion of each regular playing season.

=== The Dally Messenger stand at the Sydney Cricket Ground ===
A stand at the Sydney Cricket Ground was also named after Messenger, in recognition of his many outstanding games of club and representative football.

=== Rugby League Hall of Fame ===
In 2003 he was admitted into the Australian Rugby League Hall of Fame.

=== Royal Agricultural Society Shield ===
In 2004, the original (first 6 years) premiership trophy, the Royal Agricultural Society Shield, presented to Dally Messenger personally in 1914 and held by Messenger's family became part of the National Museum of Australia collection.

=== Formal reinstatement by The Australian Rugby Union ===
In 2007, a century after he was shunned by rugby union for switching to rugby league for 180 pounds, his playing record was formally reinstated.

=== The 100 greatest ever players ===
In February 2008, Messenger was named in a list of Australia's 100 greatest ever players (1908–2007) commissioned by the NRL / ARL to celebrate the code's Australian centenary year.

=== Team of the Century ===
Messenger went on to be named in Australian rugby league's Team of the Century. Announced on 17 April 2008, the team was a selection panel's majority choice for each of the 13 starting positions and four interchange players.

=== NSW Rugby League Team of the Century ===
In 2008 New South Wales announced their rugby league team of the century also, naming Messenger on the wing. If he were playing today, however, because of the increased average size of footballers, he would probably play as a halfback (scrum-half).

=== Messenger Statue outside the Sydney Football Stadium ===
Messenger was immortalised in 2008 by a life-size bronze sculpture created by artist Cathy Weiszmann and erected outside the Sydney Football Stadium. Rugby historian Sean Fagan provided historical background support. The statue forms the second sculpture in a 10-part series for the Sydney Cricket Ground Trust's Basil Sellers Sports Sculptures Project. The artistic advisor to the Trust was Henry Mulholland.

=== Rugby League Immortal ===
Joining fellow pre-WWII greats Dave Brown and Frank Burge, Messenger was inducted as a Rugby League Immortal in 2018, along with recent greats Norm Provan and Mal Meninga.

== External videos and articles ==
- Video tribute to Dally Messenger presented at the 2008 Dally M Awards
- Memorial Video on Dally Messenger published by Eastern Suburbs Memorial Park (cemetery) featuring historian grandson Dally Messenger III
- Herbert ‘Dally’ Messenger at the Sport Australia Hall of Fame
- Australian Rugby League Hall of Fame
- A Personal History told by Dally Messenger III
- Dally Messenger in Rugby Union's Classic Wallabies
- Dally Messenger and the Messenger Family published by the Woollahra Municipal Council.

== Published books ==
- Fagan, Sean / Messenger, Dally III (2007) The Master – The Life and Times of Dally Messenger, Australia First Sporting Superstar, Hachette Livre, Sydney ISBN 978 0 7336 2200 7 (pbk)
- Fagan, Sean (2005 & 2007) The Rugby Rebellion: Pioneers of Rugby League, RL1908, Sydney
- Heads, Ian (1992) True Blue, Ironbark, Sydney
- Various Authors (1997) Oxford Companion to Australian Sport, Oxford University Press, Melbourne
- Whiticker, Alan (2004) Captaining the Kangaroos, New Holland, Sydney
- Moran, Herbert (1939) Viewless Winds – the recollections and digressions of an Australian surgeon P Davies, London
- Messenger, Dally Raymond (1982). The Master: the story of H.H. 'Dally' Messenger and the beginnings of Australian Rugby League. Angus & Robertson. ISBN 0-207-14731-0.

== More External links ==
Preceded by Alex Burdon	Australian national rugby league captain 1908-10	Succeeded by Larry O'Malley
Preceded by Arthur Conlin (1910)	Record-holder; Most points in an NSWRFL career 1911 (106) - 1918 (379)	Succeeded by Harold Horder (1918)
