= Billy Dalton =

Australian rugby league footballer (1888-1956)

Personal information
- Full name: William Francis Dalton
- Born: 7 May 1888 Sydney, New South Wales, Australia
- Died: 19 December 1956 (aged 68) Bexley, New South Wales, Australia

Playing information
- Position: Hooker, Lock, Prop, Second-row
Club
Years	Team	Pld	T	G	FG	P
1911–12	Eastern Suburbs	14	0	0	0	0
1914	Glebe	1	0	0	0	0
	Total	15	0	0	0	0
- Source: As of 11 February 2019
- Relatives: Barney Dalton (brother)

William Francis Dalton (May 7, 1888 - December 19, 1956) was a pioneer rugby league footballer in the New South Wales Rugby League in the 1911–12 and 1914 seasons.

== Playing career ==
Dalton, a Lock and Paddington Junior, played for the Eastern Suburbs club the year that club won its first premiership in 1911, he was also a member of their second premiership side in 1912.

He finished his career at Glebe in 1914.

Dalton is recognised as being the Sydney Roosters club's 58th player.

His brother, Barney Dalton, also played with Eastern Suburbs.
