= Eddie Griffiths =

Australian rugby league footballer, soldier and firefighter

Personal information
- Full name: Edward James Griffiths
- Born: 18 July 1891 Pyrmont, New South Wales, Australia
- Died: 1 November 1980 (aged 89) Manly, New South Wales

Playing information
- Position: Second-row
Club
Years	Team	Pld	T	G	FG	P
1909–12	Eastern Suburbs	37	8	0	0	24
1913–14	Western Suburbs	11	0	0	0	0
	Total	48	8	0	0	24
- Source: Whiticker/Hudson
- Military career
- Allegiance: Australia
- Branch: Australian Army
- Service years: 1915-1918
- Conflicts: World War I; Gallipoli campaign

Edward James Griffiths (1891-1980) was an Australian fire fighter, veteran of the Gallipoli campaign and a three-time premiership-winning rugby league player with the Eastern Suburbs club.

== Career and war service ==
Born in Pyrmont, New South Wales in 1891, Eddie Griffiths joined the fire service as a Brigades Cadet Corps at just sixteen years of age and his exploits since that time are legendary. Current station commander of the 'D' Platoon in the NSW Fire Brigade recalls Griffiths as a tough fearless man who always led by example, describing him as "Our greatest fire fighter"......”A legend in the true sense of the word". In 1948 Griffiths was given the highest honour of any fire fighter when he was promoted to Chief Officer of the NSW Fire Brigades.

A veteran of the First World War, Griffiths, a member of an Australian artillery unit, served in Egypt and Gallipoli.

== Rugby league career ==
Eddie Griffiths played 4 seasons with Easts and was a member of the Eastern Suburbs rugby league sides that won premierships in 1911, 1912 & 1913, retaining permanent ownership of the New South Wales Rugby League's first trophy, the Royal Agricultural Society Shield. He played 37 first grade games with Easts between 1909 and 1912. He then joined the Western Suburbs Magpies.

== Accolades ==
FIRE BRIGADE

CHIEF Mr. E. Griffiths Mr. E. J. Griffiths yesterday became Chief Officer of the New South Wales Fire Brigades. He succeeded Mr. W. H. Beare, who has retired after 40 years' service. Mr. Griffiths, who was born at Pyrmont 56 years ago, has also been a fireman for 40 years. MR. E. J. GRIFFITHS He was an original Anzac, taking part in the landing at Gallipoli.

For many years he played Rugby League football for Eastern Suburbs, when Dally Messenger was captain of the club......

— Sydney Morning Herald

== Death ==
Eddie Griffiths died at a nursing home at Manly on 1 November 1980, age 89. He was cremated at Northern Suburbs Crematorium on 4 Nov 1980.
