= List of Sydney Roosters seasons =

Below is a list of the seasons that the Sydney Roosters have competed in since 1908.

== Seasons ==
Season	Wins	Draws	Losses	Regular Season Result	Final Season Result
1908	9	0	2	2nd from 9	Runners-up
1909	5	0	6	4th from 8	Semi-finals
1910	9	2	3	3rd from 8	3rd
1911	12	2	3	2nd from 8	Premiers
1912	13	0	1	1st from 8	Premiers
1913	12	0	2	1st from 8	Premiers
1914	8	0	6	3rd from 8	3rd
1915	6	0	8	5th from 8	5th
1916	7	2	5	4th from 8	4th
1917	7	0	7	6th from 8	6th
1918	8	0	6	5th from 8	5th
1919	9	2	3	2nd from 8	Runners-up
1920	8	0	6	6th from 9	6th
1921	6	1	1	2nd from 9	Runners-up
1922	9	2	5	3rd from 9	3rd
1923	14	0	3	1st from 9	Premiers
1924	3	0	5	7th from 9	7th
1925	4	0	8	8th from 9	8th
1926	9	1	7	3rd from 9	Semi-finals
1927	8	2	7	4th from 9	Semi-finals
1928	12	0	2	2nd from 9	Runners-up
1929	4	2	10	7th from 9	7th
1930	11	0	4	2nd from 8	Semi-finals
1931	12	0	4	1st from 8	Runners-up
1932	9	0	6	3rd from 8	Semi-finals
1933	8	1	6	2nd from 8	Semi-finals
1934	13	0	4	1st from 8	Runners-up
1935	17	0	1	1st from 9	Premiers
1936	13	2	0	1st from 9	Premiers
1937	6	2	0	1st from 9	Premiers
1938	7	3	6	4th from 8	Runners-up
1939	8	0	6	5th from 8	5th
1940	11	1	4	1st from 8	Premiers
1941	10	0	6	1st from 8	Runners-up
1942	9	0	7	4th from 8	Semi-finals
1943	4	0	10	6th from 8	6th
1944	4	0	10	7th from 8	7th
1945	13	0	3	1st from 8	Premiers
1946	8	0	6	5th from 8	5th
1947	5	1	12	8th from 10	8th
1948	7	2	9	6th from 10	6th
1949	3	1	14	10th from 10	10th
1950	7	0	11	7th from 10	7th
1951	9	0	9	5th from 10	5th
1952	6	0	12	8th from 10	8th
1953	10	1	8	4th from 10	Semi-finals
1954	3	1	14	9th from 10	9th
1955	8	1	9	6th from 10	6th
1956	5	1	12	9th from 10	9th
1957	9	0	9	8th from 10	8th
1958	8	0	10	7th from 10	7th
1959	6	0	12	8th from 10	8th
1960	14	0	9	3rd from 10	Runners-up
1961	9	1	8	5th from 10	5th
1962	9	1	8	5th from 10	5th
1963	3	0	15	10th from 10	10th
1964	2	0	16	9th from 10	9th
1965	3	1	14	10th from 10	10th
1966	0	0	18	10th from 10	10th
1967	13	2	8	4th from 12	Semi-finals
1968	14	1	8	4th from 12	Semi-finals
1969	8	1	13	9th from 12	9th
1970	13	0	9	5th from 12	5th
1971	9	1	12	9th from 12	9th
1972	18	1	6	2nd from 12	Runners-up
1973	12	0	10	6th from 12	6th
1974	21	0	4	1st from 12	Premiers
1975	22	0	3	1st from 12	Premiers
1976	13	1	9	4th from 12	Semi-finals
1977	16	1	8	3rd from 12	Semi-finals
1978	13	0	9	6th from 12	6th
1979	9	1	12	8th from 12	8th
1980	15	2	8	1st from 12	Runners-up
1981	16	0	8	1st from 12	Semi-finals
1982	17	2	10	4th from 14	Semi-finals
1983	14	1	12	6th from 14	6th
1984	5	1	18	12th from 13	12th
1985	10	3	11	7th from 13	7th
1986	10	0	14	9th from 13	9th
1987	16	1	10	2nd from 13	Semi-finals
1988	6	3	13	12th from 16	12th
1989	9	1	12	11th from 16	11th
1990	6	1	15	14th from 16	14th
1991	9	1	12	11th from 16	11th
1992	12	0	10	6th from 16	6th
1993	11	1	10	8th from 16	8th
1994	6	1	15	14th from 16	14th
1995	12	0	10	9th from 20	9th
1996	15	1	8	4th from 20	Semi-finals
1997	15	1	9	5th from 12	Preliminary Finals
1998	18	0	9	6th from 20	Preliminary Finals
1999	16	0	10	4th from 17	Semi-finals
2000	18	0	12	2nd from 14	Runners-up
2001	13	1	13	6th from 14	Semi-finals
2002	19	1	8	4th from 15	Premiers
2003	19	0	8	2nd from 15	Runners-up
2004	21	0	6	1st from 15	Runners-up
2005	11	0	13	9th from 15	9th
2006	8	0	16	14th from 15	14th
2007	10	1	13	10th from 16	10th
2008	15	0	11	4th from 16	Semi-finals
2009	5	0	19	16th from 16	16th
2010	17	0	11	6th from 16	Runners-up
2011	10	0	14	11th from 16	11th
2012	8	1	15	13th from 16	13th
2013	21	0	6	1st from 16	Premiers
2014	17	0	10	1st from 16	Preliminary Finals
2015	19	0	8	1st from 16	Preliminary Finals
2016	6	0	18	15th from 16	15th
2017	18	0	8	2nd from 16	Preliminary Finals
2018	19	0	8	1st from 16	Premiers
2019	20	0	7	2nd from 16	Premiers
2020					
2021					
2022					
2023					
2024					
