= 1921 Eastern Suburbs season =

← 1920	1922 →

Eastern Suburbs (now known as the Sydney Roosters) competed in the 14th New South Wales Rugby League (NSWRL) premiership in 1921.

== Details ==
- Home Ground: Agricultural Ground
- Line ups:-

No.

Position
Player

10 Sid 'Sandy' Pearce – HK 49 John 'Dinny' Campbell – CE 54 Charlie Lees – PR 66 Jack 'Bluey' Watkins – SR 67 Les Cubitt – FE 86 Harry Caples – FE 92 Ray Norman – CE 96 Gordon Wright – WG

No.

Position
Player

99 Rex Norman – CE 103 Sid Kaufman – HB 104 Robert batchelor – SR 113 Bill Cameron – SR 114 Ed 'Snowy' Rigney – FB 115 Fred Hume – CE 123 Harold Holmes – SR 124 Bill Ives – SR

== Results ==
In 1921 there was only one round of matches played!

- Premiership Round 1, bye.
- Premiership Round 2, Saturday 30 April 1921;

Eastern Suburbs 32( 6 Tries; 7 Goals) defeated South Sydney 8( Funnell, McGrath Tries; Oxford Goal) at the Sydney Cricket Ground.

- Premiership Round 3, Saturday 7 May 1921;

Eastern Suburbs 30 (Tries 6; Goals 6) defeated Newtown 5(Try; Goal) at Sydney Cricket Ground.

This was reported to be a particularly wild match, reporter for the Sun newspaper, Claude Corbett, wrote "The first half was one of the wildest exhibitions of football I have ever seen. Newtown was solely responsible. There were times when a dozen players were tossing about in a heap, tearing and reefing at each other. Fists and feet flew on occasions and it was a miracle that no one was hurt.

- Premiership Round 4, Saturday 14 May 1921;

Eastern Suburbs 23( Tries 5; Goals 4) defeated St George 11(Try; Goals 3; Field Goal) at the Sydney Cricket Ground No.2.

This was the first meeting of the two clubs.

- Premiership Round 5, Saturday 21 May;

Eastern Suburbs 8( Norman 4 Goals) drew with North Sydney 8( Blinkhorn, Green Tries; Thompson Goal) at Sydney Cricket Ground.

Described as the match of the season, Premiers, North Sydney, and eventual runners up Eastern Suburbs drew their match 8-all. The win, with no final played that year, virtually assured Norths of their 1st premiership. The official attendance was 44,818, but thousands more scaled the surrounding fences and walls - It was the largest crowd seen at a club match and remained so until the 1940s. A last gasp try by North’s George Green, just as Easts forward Jack 'Bluey' Watkins nailed him right on the corner flag, secured the draw for Norths.

- Premiership Round 6, Saturday 28 May 1921;

Balmain 14(Tries 2; Goals 4) defeated Eastern Suburbs 8(Tries 2; Goal) at Sydney Sports Ground.

- Premiership Round 7, ??? 11 June;

Eastern Suburbs 19 (Tries 5; Goals 2) defeated Glebe 3(Tries) at the Sydney Cricket Ground.

- Premiership Round 8, ??? 18 June;

Eastern Suburbs 55(Rex Norman 3, + 10 Tries; Rex Norman 8 Goals) defeated University 11 (Tries 3; Goal) at the Sydney Cricket Ground.

- Premiership Round 9, Saturday 25 June 1921;

Eastern Suburbs 12( Tries 2; Goals 3) defeated Western Suburbs 7( Try; Goals 2) at Pratten Park.

== Ladder ==
	Team	Pld	W	D	L	B	PF	PA	PD	Pts
1	North Sydney	8	7	1	0	1	172	82	+90	17
2	Eastern Suburbs	8	6	1	1	1	187	67	+120	15
3	Glebe	8	6	0	2	1	115	71	+44	14
4	Balmain	8	5	0	3	1	135	71	+64	12
5	South Sydney	8	4	0	4	1	141	104	+37	10
6	Newtown	8	3	0	5	1	77	117	+40	8
7	St George	8	2	0	6	1	87	124	-37	6
8	Western Suburbs	8	2	0	6	1	90	155	-65	6
9	University	8	0	0	8	1	82	295	-213	2

== Season highlights ==
- Eastern Suburbs were defeated by South Sydney 21-10 in the final of that year's City Cup.
- Rex Norman Was the New South Wales Rugby League's leading pointscorer.
- Gordon Wright was the New South Wales Rugby League's leading try scorer for the 3rd year running.
- Sid 'Sandy' Pearce, the last remaining member of Eastern suburbs original 1908 team, retired after breaking his leg on that year's 'Kangaroo Tour'.
- Representatives: Rex Norman(NSW), Bill Ives(NSW), Ed Rigney(NSW), Sid 'Sandy' Pearce (Australia)

Preceded by 1920	Season; 1921	Succeeded by 1922
