= 1917 Eastern Suburbs season =

← 1916	1918 →

Eastern Suburbs (now known as the Sydney Roosters) competed in the 10th New South Wales Rugby League(NSWRL) premiership in 1917.

== Details ==
No.

Position
Player

10 Sid 'Sandy' Pearce – HK 45 Bob Williams – PR 54 Charlie Lees – PR 62 Wally Messenger – CE 67 Les Cubitt – FE 72 George Challis – FB 79 Jim Duffy – WG 82 R. McKellar – WG 83 C. Barker – FB 84 Bob Linklater – WG 85 Abraham Jonas – WG

No.

Position
Player

86 Harry Caples – FE 88 T. Jones – FE 89 W. Raymond – FE 90 Francis Male – HB 91 Max Doerner – HB 92 Ray Norman – CE 93 T. O'Conner – CE 94 R. Adams – FB 95 W. Tijou – CE 96 Gordon Wright – WG

== Results ==
- Premiership Round 1, Saturday 12 May 1917,

Eastern Suburbs 10 defeated North Sydney 0 at the Agricultural Ground.

- Premiership Round 2, Saturday 19 May 1917.

Glebe 5 ( Pert try, A. B. Burge goal ) defeated Eastern Suburbs 4 ( Messenger 2 goals ) at the Sydney Cricket Ground.

"Had Glebe been penalised to the full extent for glaring Interference in the flrst half the result muy have been reversed. Wright, the Glebe three-quarter, was the delinquent, and the referee should have awarded Cubitt a penalty try for such a bad breach"

Sydney Morning Herald.

- Premiership Round 3, Saturday 26 May 1917

Eastern Suburbs 9 ( Cubitt try; Messenger 3 Goals ) defeated South Sydney 6 ( Norman, Vaughan Tries ) at Agricultural Ground.

The result was said to be in doubt right up until the end

- Premiership Round 4, Saturday 2 June 1917,

Newtown 11 defeated Eastern Suburbs 3 at the Sydney Cricket Ground.

- Premiership Round 5, Tuesday 5 June 1917;

Balmain 13 defeated Eastern Suburbs 2 at the Sydney Cricket Ground.

- Premiership Round 6, Saturday 9 June 1917;

Western Suburbs 15 defeated Eastern Suburbs 2 at St Luke's Park.

- Premiership Round 7, Saturday 16 June 1917;

Eastern Suburbs 14 defeated Annandale 9( J.Bain 3 tries) at the Agricultural Ground

- Premiership Round 8, Saturday 23 June 1917;

Eastern Suburbs 16 defeated North Sydney 11(Deane, Emelhenz, Blinkhorn; Tries; Robetson Goal) at the Sydney Cricket Ground.

- Premiership Round 9, Monday 25 June 1917;

Eastern Suburbs 14 beat Glebe 10 at the Agricultural Ground.

- Premiership Round 10, Saturday 30 June 1917;

South Sydney 18( H. Horder, Moore, Vaughn Tries; Lucas 3 Goals) Defeated Eastern Suburbs 13 at the Sydney Sports Ground.

- Premiership Round 11, Saturday 7 July 1917;

Newtown 12 beat Eastern Suburbs 11 at the Sydney Cricket Ground.

- Premiership Round 12, Saturday 14 July 1917;

Balmain 18 defeated Eastern Suburbs 0 at the Sydney Cricket Ground.

- Premiership Round 13, Saturday 21 July 1917;

Eastern Suburbs 14 beat Western Suburbs 9 at the Sydney Cricket Ground.

- Premiership Round 14, Saturday 28 July 1917;

Eastern Suburbs 19 beat Annandale 8 at the Agricultural Ground.

== Table ==
	Team	Pld	W	D	L	PF	PA	PD	Pts
1	Balmain	14	13	0	1	269	61	+208	26
2	South Sydney	14	9	0	5	236	143	+93	18
3	Western Suburbs	14	7	1	6	162	160	+2	15
4	Newtown	14	7	1	6	114	123	-9	15
5	Glebe	14	8	0	6	207	165	+42	14
6	Eastern Suburbs	14	7	0	7	131	145	-14	14
7	Annandale	14	1	2	11	71	214	-143	6
8	North Sydney	14	2	0	12	90	269	-179	4

- Glebe were stripped of two competition points due to fielding an ineligible player in one game.

== Season Highlights ==
- Won the 3rd grade competition.

Preceded by 1916	Season; 1917	Succeeded by 1918
