= 1918 Eastern Suburbs season =

Rugby league team season

← 1917	1919 →

Eastern Suburbs (now known as the Sydney Roosters) competed in the 11th New South Wales Rugby League (NSWRL) premiership in 1918.

== Details ==
- Home Ground: Agricultural Ground
- Lineups:

No.

Position
Player

10 Sid 'Sandy' Pearce – HK 45 Bob Williams – PR 54 Charlie Lees – PR 62 Wally Messenger – CE 64 D. Flannery – CE 67 Les Cubitt – FE 79 Jim Duffy – WG 82 R. McKellar – WG 83 C. Barker – FB 84 Bob Linklater – SR 86 Harry Caples – FE

No.

Position
Player

92 Ray Norman – CE 95 W. Tijou – CE 96 Gordon Wright – WG 97 H. Keane – CE 98 F. Moran – CE 99 Rex Norman – CE 100 W. Lyon – CE 101 Tom Glazebook – CE 102 Albert Arrowsmith – SR 103 Sid Kauffmann – HB 104 Robert Batchelor – CE

== Results ==
- Premiership Round 1, Saturday 11 May 1918;

Eastern Suburbs 17 defeated Newtown 3 at the Agricultural Ground.

- Premiership Round 2, Saturday 18 May 1918;

Eastern Suburbs 8 defeated Western Suburbs 2 at Sydney Cricket Ground.

- Premiership Round 3, Saturday 25 May 1918;

Eastern Suburbs 17 defeated Glebe 9 at the Agricultural Ground.

- Premiership Round 4, Saturday 1 June 1918;

South Sydney 16( H. Horder 2, Arthur, C. Horder Tries; H. Hallett Goal) defeated Eastern Suburbs 5 at the Agricultural Ground.

- Premiership Round 5, Monday 3 June 1918;

North Sydney 16 defeated Eastern Suburbs 8 at the Agricultural Ground.

- Premiership Round 6, Saturday 8 June 1918;

Eastern Suburbs 9 defeated Annandale 5 at Wentworth Park.

- Premiership Round 7, Saturday 15 June 1918;

Balmain Tigers|Balmain 11 defeated Eastern Suburbs 10 at Sydney Cricket Ground. Premiership Round 8, Monday 24 June 1918; Eastern Suburbs 20 defeated Newtown 15 at Agricultural Ground.

- Premiership Round 9, Saturday 29 June 1918;

Western Suburbs 16 defeated Eastern Suburbs 9 at Sydney Cricket Ground.

- Premiership Round 10, Saturday 6 July 1918;

Glebe 18 defeated Eastern Suburbs 5 at Agricultural Ground.

- Premiership Round 11, Saturday 13 July 1918;

South Sydney 13( H. Horder, Groves, Kerwick Tries; A. Oxford, H. Horder Goals) defeated Eastern Suburbs 5 at Sydney Cricket Ground.

- Premiership Round 12, Saturday 20 July 1918;

????????????????????????????????????

- Premiership Round 13, Saturday 27 July 1918;

Eastern Suburbs 15 defeated Annandale 8 at Sydney Cricket Ground.

- Premiership Round 14, Saturday 3 August 1918 - Eastern Suburbs 22 defeated Balmain 15 at Agricultural Ground.

== Ladder ==
	Team	Pld	W	D	L	PF	PA	PD	Pts
1	South Sydney	14	12	0	2	257	121	+136	24
2	Western Suburbs	14	11	0	3	182	102	+80	22
3	Glebe	14	9	0	5	212	128	+84	18
4	Balmain	14	8	1	5	215	148	+67	17
5	EASTERN SUBURBS	14	8	0	6	160	153	+7	16
6	North Sydney	14	3	2	9	131	202	-71	8
7	Newtown	14	2	3	9	115	175	-60	7
8	Annandale	14	0	0	14	73	316	-243	0

Preceded by 1917	Season; 1918	Succeeded by 1919
