= 1919 Eastern Suburbs season =

← 1918	1920 →

Eastern Suburbs (now known as the Sydney Roosters) competed in the 12th New South Wales Rugby League (NSWRL) premiership in 1919.

== Details ==
- Home Ground: Agricultural Ground.
- Lineups:-

No.

Position
Player

10 Sid 'Sandy' Pearce – HK 54 Charlie Lees – PR 62 Wally Messenger – CE 66 Jack 'Bluey' Watkins – SR 67 Les Cubitt – FE 79 Jim Duffy – WG 82 R. McKellar – WG 84 Bob Linklater – SR 86 Harry Caples – FE 92 Ray Norman – CE 94 R. Adams – SR

No.

Position
Player

95 W. Tijou – CE 96 Gordon Wright – WG 103 Sid Kauffmann – HB 104 Robert Batchelor – SR 105 Harold Bawden – SR 106 Reg Farnell – PR 107 Stan King – SR 108 J. Larkin – SR 109 R. Burton – SR 110 Robert Edward connerton – SR 111 W. Freeman – FB 112 Ernie Tate – SR

== Results ==
- Premiership Round 1, Saturday 10 May 1919;

Eastern Suburbs 19 defeated Newtown 3 at the Sydney Cricket Ground.

- Premiership Round 2, Saturday 17 May 1919;

Eastern Suburbs 10 defeated Glebe 13 at the Agricultural Ground.

- Premiership Round 3, Saturday 24 May 1919;

Eastern Suburbs 23 defeated North Sydney 5 at North Sydney Oval.

- Premiership Round 4, Saturday 31 May 1919;

Eastern Suburbs ??? defeated Western Suburbs 10 at Agricultural Ground.

- Premiership Round Saturday 28 June 1919;

Eastern Suburbs 16 defeated South Sydney 8 at Sydney Cricket Ground.

- Premiership Round 7, Saturday 5 July 1919;

Eastern Suburbs 3( Wright Try) drew with Balmain 3( Halloway Try) at Sydney Cricket Ground;

- Premiership Round 8, Saturday 12 July 1919 - Eastern Suburbs 15 drew with Newtown 15 at the Agricultural Ground.

Eastern Suburbs were soon attacking, but good defence by Newtown kept the game interestingly even. Then Cubitt, dodging cleverly, passed out to Wright, who opened the scoring with a try. Messenger added a Penalty goal soon afterwards, making Eastern Suburbs 5 to nil. Newtown forwards packed admirably In the scrum, and Eastern Suburbs' hooker, the veteran S. Pearce, did not seem able to compete against his opponent. Newtown's backs, however, lacked the necessary combination to take advantage of their forwards' superiority. At length the full-back kicked over Eastern Suburbs' line, and Ryan followed through and scored. Eastern Suburtbs, 5 to 3. Bain then obtained a penally goal, and the scores were level. Eastern Suburbs' forwards then secured possession in the open and after Bawden had been tackled bv Rigney, Watkins, always alert, scored a try, which was converted by Norman. Newtown retaliated before half time. Gillespie obtaining a try. At the interval Eastern Suburbs led by 10 to 8. Again Newtown equalised the scores, Boys kicking a penalty goal soon after play was resumed. 10 all. Newtown defended well against strong attacks on each wing. Messenger and Wright being stopped in turn. Watkins then made an opening for the backs. Cubitt passed to Wright, who ran over the line in fine style. Messenger converted, and Eastern Suburbs led by 15 to 10. Newtown had much the better of the latter part of the game. They frequently attacked, and only strenuous defence by Eastern Suburbs prevented Newtown scoring. As full-time approached the game became very exciting. Within a few minutes of the final whistle Johnson passed to Gillespie, who added the third try for Newtown. Boys converted and once more made the scores equal. 15 all- Gillespie's work at five-eighth was a feature of the game.

- Premiership Round 9, Saturday 26 July 1919

Eastern Suburbs 15 defeated Glebe 11 at the Sydney Cricket Ground.

- Premiership Round 10, Saturday 2 August 1919;

Eastern Suburbs 33 defeated North Sydney 0 at Sydney Cricket Ground.

- Premiership Round 11, Saturday 9 August 1919,

Eastern Suburbs 5 (Cubitt try; Messenger goal) beat Western Suburbs 0 at Sydney Cricket Ground;

Western Suburbs played with the wind in the first half, but this assistance was not of much advantage. Eastern Suburbs backs were particularly smart in making openings, Cubitt moving about in good style whenever an opportunity offered. Norman was also clever In all-round play. The Western Suburbs backs could not get going, though several strong attempts were made. Wright put in a couple of fast runs for Eastern Suburbs without avail. He was well watched, and his centre kicks were blocked. Two long kicks by White drove the ball over the line for a force in each case. Freeman did not appear at all safe at full-back. There was only one score in the first half. Caples put In a fine run, and with a clear field looked certain to score. His speed slackened, and when collared from behind be passed back to Cubitt, who easily scored a try. Messenger added a goal, and Eastern Suburbs led by 5 to nil at half-time.

A fine dash by the Eastern Suburbs forwards soon after play was restarted ended in a knock-on near the corner post. The backs then took part in a fine attack, Wright being twisted round into touch by Vest. A free, however, was awarded Eastern Suburbs, and Messenger sent the ball just under the bar. Caples was kicking strongly, and several times got his side out of difficult positions. Neither set of backs, how-ever, handled the ball well, but, on the other hand, the tackling was particularly good. Cubitt distinguished himself by solid defence, and Norman was continually prominent in taking man and ball. Western Suburbs seemed unable to make progress, and good passing by their opponents ended in Messenger and Wright being blocked on the respective Wings. Wright once kicked the ball against the comer post. Burns and Gilbert made strong efforts to get through as the game advanced, but they were effectually collared. Near the close Messenger missed a goal from a free, and, the second half being scoreless. Eastern Suburbs won by 5 points to nil

- Premiership Round 12, Saturday 16 August 1919;

Eastern Suburbs 28 defeated Annandale 0 at Wentworth Park.

- Premiership Round 13, Saturday 23 August 1919;

South Sydney 15 defeated Eastern Suburbs 12 at the Agricultural Ground.

A late try to lowly placed South Sydney's Harold Horder cost Easts the outright premiership lead.

- Premiership Round 14, Saturday 30 August 1919 - Balmain 13 defeated Eastern Suburbs 4 at the Agricultural Ground.

The premiership went right down to the final round of the competition. With no finals system in place for 1919, it was a case of first past the post. Balmain led 4-2 at the break after two penalty goals to L. Wall. The Tricolours two points came from a penalty goal to Wally Messenger. On the resumption of play the two fullbacks were involved in a kicking duel which eventually resulted in Wall kicking a field goal. Messenger was then reported to have kicked a goal but referee Tom McMahon overruled both touch judges and disallowed the goal. The Balmain fullback kicked another making the score 8-2. Following this Caples moved to five-eight. Easts struck back with a penalty goal to Wally Messenger. Easts winger Gordon Wright lost the ball on his own line, Robinson pounced on the loose ball and scored, Wall converted making the final score 13-4, giving Balmain their fourth premiership.

== Ladder ==
	Team	Pld	W	D	L	PF	PA	PD	Pts
1	Balmain	14	11	1	2	277	121	+168	23
2	Eastern Suburbs	14	9	2	3	229	108	+121	20
3	Western Suburbs	14	9	0	5	239	130	+109	18
4	Glebe	14	9	0	5	209	134	+75	18
5	Newtown	14	6	2	6	123	186	-63	14
6	South Sydney	14	6	1	7	208	223	-15	13
7	Annandale	14	1	1	12	86	270	-184	3
8	North Sydney	14	1	1	12	103	314	-211	3

== Season highlights ==
- Gordon Wright was the New South Wales Rugby League (NSWRL)'s leading try scorer.
- Representatives - Les Cubitt (Australia, NSW), Jack Watkins (Australia, NSW), Harry Caples(NSW), Sid Kaufman (NSW), Ray Norman (Australia, NSW).

Preceded by 1918	Season; 1919	Succeeded by 1920
