= 1920 Eastern Suburbs season =

← 1919	1921 →

Eastern Suburbs (now known as the Sydney Roosters) competed in the 13th New South Wales Rugby League (NSWRL) premiership in 1920.

== Details ==
- Home Ground: Agricultural Ground
- Lineup:-

No.

Position
Player

10 Sid 'Sandy' Pearce – HK 45 Bob 'Botsy" Williams – PR 54 Charlie Lees – PR 62 Wally Messenger – CE 66 Jack 'Bluey' Watkins – SR 67 Les Cubitt – FE 72 George Challis – FB 79 Jim Duffy – WG 86 Harry Caples – FE 92 Ray Norman – CE 94 R. Adams – SR 96 Gordon Wright – WG 99 Rex Norman – CE

No.

Position
Player

103 Sid Kaufman – HB 105 Harold Bawden – SR 109 R. Burton – SR 110 Robert Edward connerton – SR 113 Bill Cameron – SR 114 Ed 'Snowy' Rigney – FB 115 Fred Hume – SR 116 Arch Thompson – SR 117 Les Arthur – SR 118 Tommy Burns – SR 119 Jim Cromwell – SR 120 C Steel – SR 121 A. J. Thompson – SR 122 S. Ward – SR

== Results ==
- premiership Round 1, Saturday 1 May 1920;

Balmain 9 (Potter try; Craig 3 goals defeated Eastern Suburbs 7 (Caples try; Messenger goal; Challis field goal) at the Sydney Cricket Ground.

- Premiership Round 2, Saturday 8 May 1920;

Eastern Suburbs 19 (Wright 2, Cameron tries; Wally Messenger 3; Caples 2 goals) defeated Newtown 7 (Boys try; Boys goal) at the Agricultural Society Ground.

- Premiership Round 3, Saturday 15 May 1920;

Eastern Suburbs 44 (Wright, Warkins 2, Cameron, Messenger, Norman, Williams tries; Messenger 7 goals) defeated University 8 (Callan, Satterthwaite tries) at Agricultural Society Ground.

- Premiership Round 4, Saturday 22 May 1920

Eastern Suburbs 20 defeated Glebe 5 at Agricultural Ground.

- Premiership Round 5, Saturday 29 May 1920;

Eastern Suburbs 18 defeated Western Suburbs 14 at Sydney Cricket Ground.

A crowd of 30,000 watched Easts defeat Wests.

- Premiership Round 6, Thursday 17 June 1920;

Eastern Suburbs 42 defeated Annandale 10 at Sydney Cricket Ground No. 2

Premiership Round 7, Bye:

Premiership Round 8, Saturday 26 June 1920 Eastern Suburbs 12 defeated North Sydney 8 at Sydney Cricket Ground.

Premiership Round 9, Saturday 17 July 1920 - South Sydney 14 defeated Eastern Suburbs 11 at Agricultural Ground.

- Premiership Round 10, Saturday 24 July 1920,

Eastern Suburbs 30 Wright 5 + 1 Tries; 6 Goals) defeated Balmain 13 at the Agricultural Ground.

Eastern Suburbs were the only side to defeat Balmain in the 1920 season.

- Premiership Round 11, Saturday 31 July 1920;

Newtown 8(???) defeated Eastern Suburbs 0 at Agricultural Ground;

- Premiership Round 12, Saturday 7 August 1920;

North Sydney 21 defeated Eastern Suburbs 10 at Sydney Cricket Ground

- Premiership Round 13, Saturday 21 August 1920 - Glebe 29 defeated Eastern Suburbs 21 at Sydney Cricket Ground.
- Premiership Round 14, Saturday 28 August 1920 - Western Suburbs 29 defeated Eastern Suburbs 5 at Sydney Cricket Ground;
- Premiership Round 15, Wednesday 1 September 1920;

Eastern Suburbs 15 defeated Annandale 0 at Sydney Cricket Ground No.2.

== Ladder ==
	Team	Pld	W	D	L	B	PF	PA	PD	Pts
1	Balmain	13	11	1	1	2	287	114	+173	27
2	South Sydney	13	8	0	5	2	258	149	+109	20
3	Glebe	13	8	0	5	2	268	166	+102	20
4	Western Suburbs	14	8	1	5	1	309	141	+168	19
5	North Sydney	13	7	0	6	2	237	151	+86	18
6	EASTERN SUBURBS	14	8	0	6	1	254	175	+79	18
7	Newtown	14	8	0	6	1	208	203	+5	18
8	University	13	1	0	12	2	101	498	-397	6
9	Annandale	13	0	0	13	2	59	384	-325	4

== Season's highlights ==
- Won Presidents Cup
- Gordon Wright was once again the NSWRL's leading try scorer.
- Representatives:- Harry Caples (NSW), Sid Pearce (Australia, NSW).

Preceded by 1919	Season; 1920	Succeeded by 1921
