= 1920 NSWRFL season =

Rugby league competition

1920 New South Wales Rugby Football League
- Teams: 9
- Premiers: Balmain (5th title)
- Minor premiers: Balmain (5th title)
- Matches played: 60
- Points scored: 1981
- Top points scorer(s): Frank Burge (110)
- Wooden spoon: Annandale (3rd spoon)
- Top try-scorer(s): Gordon Wright (18)

The 1920 New South Wales Rugby Football League premiership was the thirteenth season of Sydney's professional rugby league football club competition, Australia's first. The introduction of a Sydney University side saw nine teams from across the city contest during the season. Balmain were crowned premiers by virtue of finishing the season on top of the League.

== Season summary ==
Due to the 1920 Great Britain Lions tour, from rounds 5 to 8, several players in the NSWRFL were selected to play matches for Metropolis (Sydney), New South Wales and Australia.

In a round 7 game between Glebe and University Frank Burge scored eight tries which remains the standing record for the most tries by an individual in a NSWRL/NRL premiership match. Arthur Oxford set the pace in goal kicking, scoring 29 goals in three games. He also took the record of most goals in succession (23) which would stand until 1978.

The NSWRFL ran the City Cup competition for the second half of the season.

The Balmain Tigers again dominated the season, while University's first year was a disappointment: the Students conceded a whopping 118 tries in thirteen games for a record “tries against” average of 9.08 per match that has not been beaten since. Balmain played consistently and defensively throughout the season except for a slip-up 13–30 loss to Eastern Suburbs in Round 10. Holding a seven-point lead on the premiership ladder with three rounds left to play secured their fifth premiership in six years. The final three rounds were left unplayed and no Finals were contested.

== Teams ==
With the addition of Sydney University's team, the League was again at nine sides. At the end of the season however, Annandale exited the League after eleven seasons, having won only fifteen and drawn four of 126 games since 1912.

- Annandale
- Balmain, formed on January 23, 1908, at Balmain Town Hall
- Eastern Suburbs, formed on January 24, 1908, at Paddington Town Hall
- Glebe, formed on January 9, 1908
- Newtown, formed on January 14, 1908
- North Sydney, formed on February 7, 1908
- South Sydney, formed on January 17, 1908, at Redfern Town Hall
- Western Suburbs, formed on February 4, 1908
- University, formed in 1919 at Sydney University

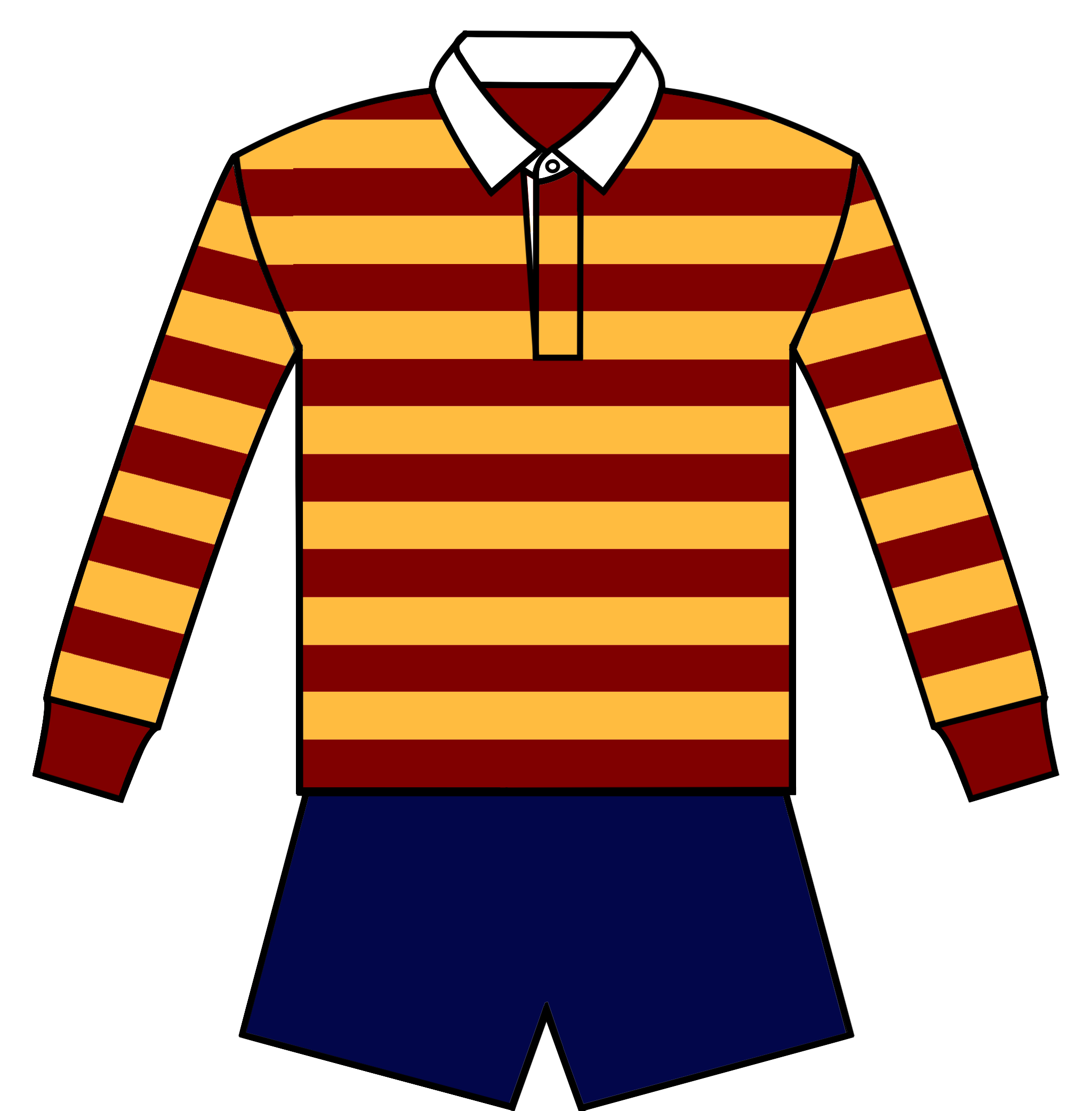
Annandale; 11th season Ground: Birchgrove Park; Coach: Captain: Tom McGuiness

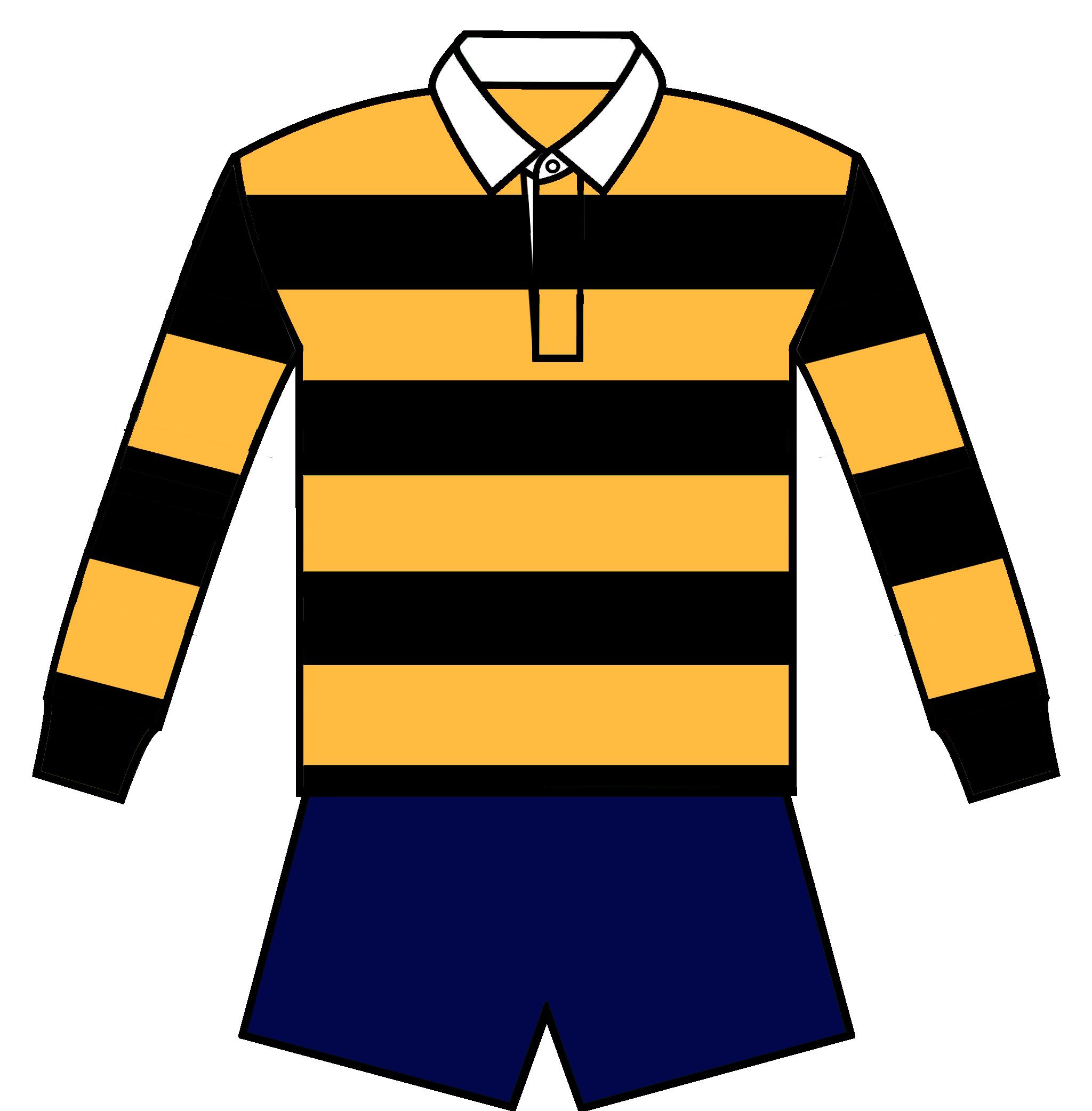
Balmain; 13th season Ground: Birchgrove Park; Captain-Coach: Arthur Halloway

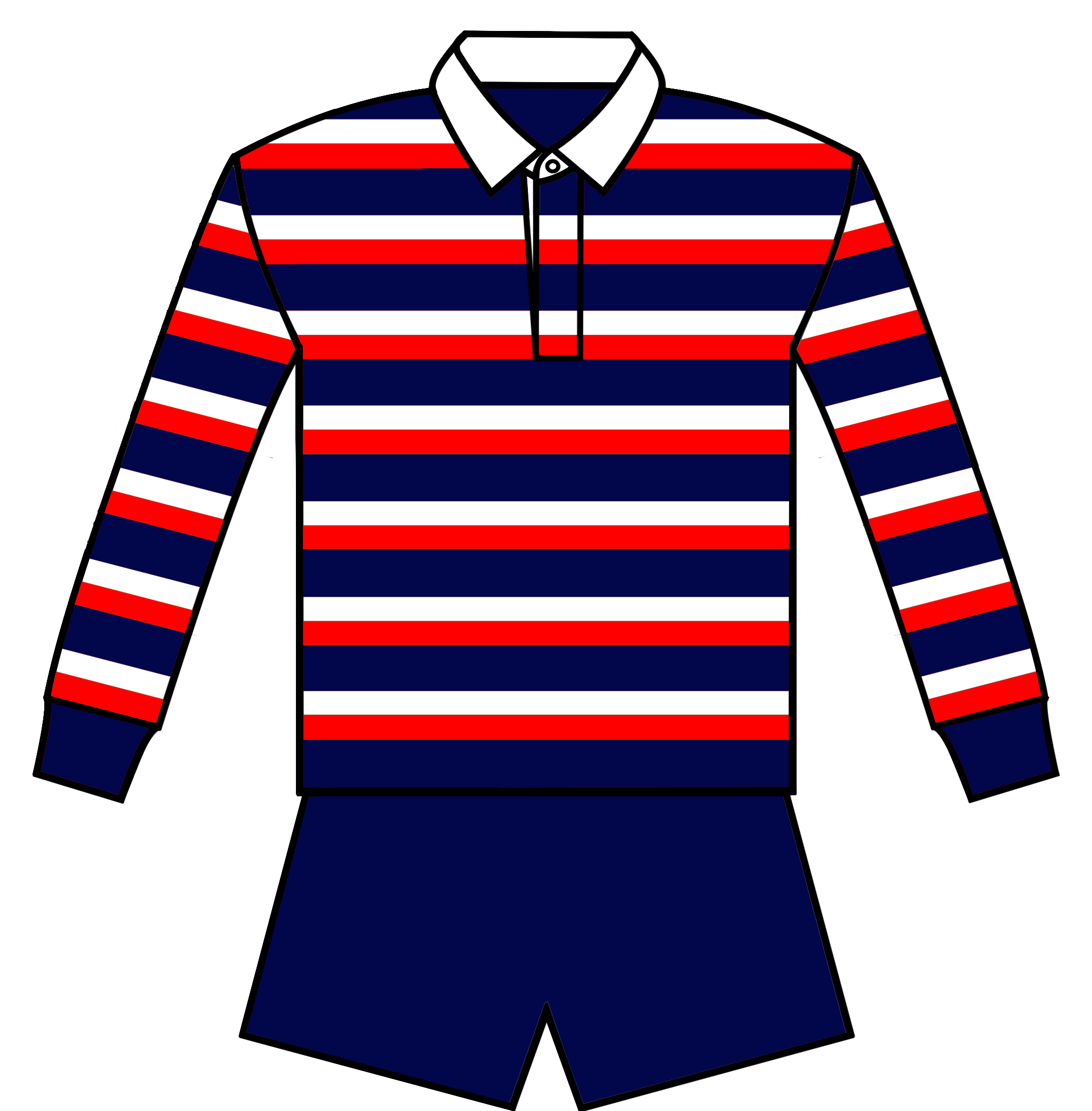
Eastern Suburbs; 13th season Ground: Sydney Sports Ground; Coach: Captain: Ray Norman

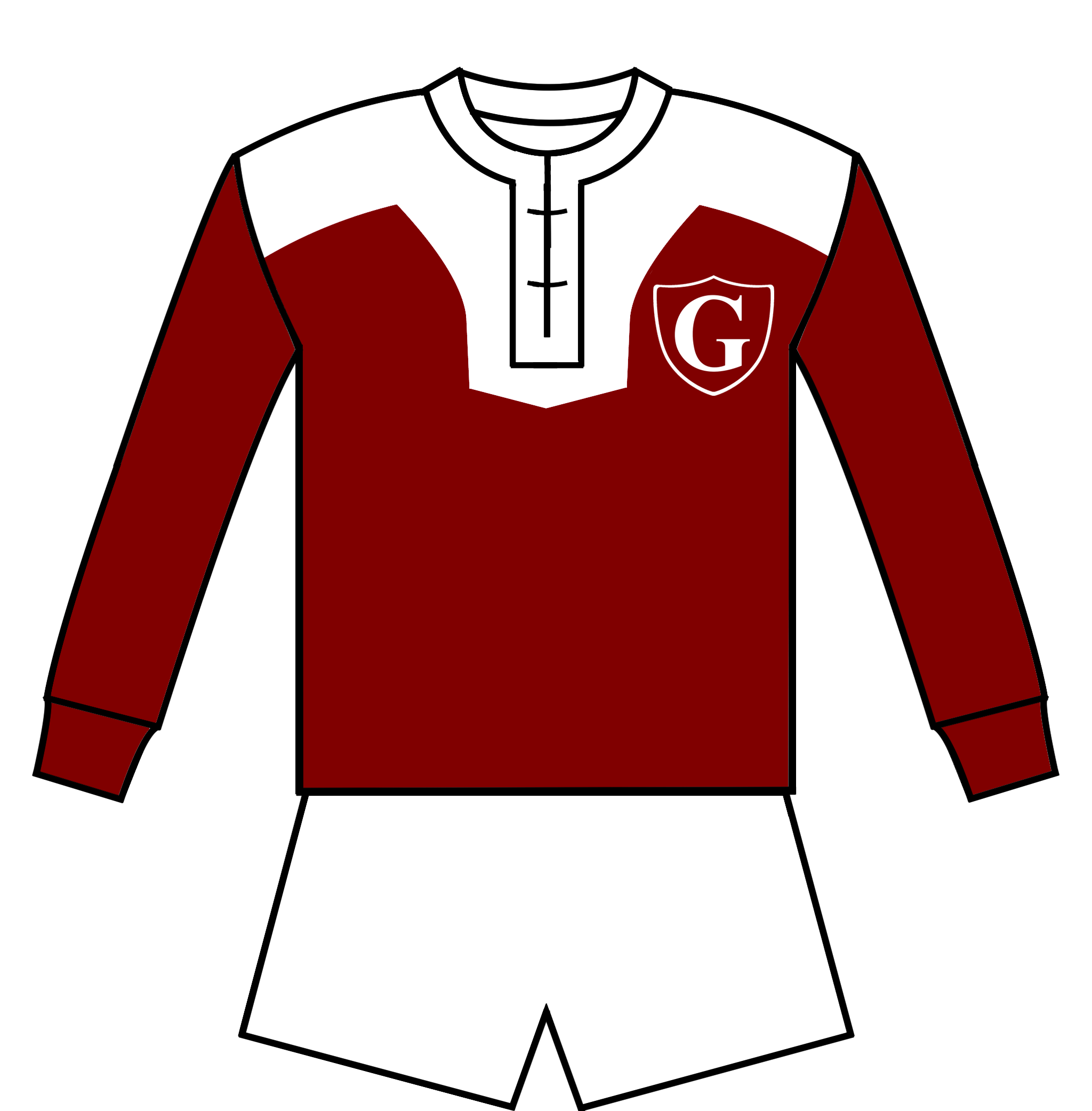
Glebe; 13th season Ground: RAS Showground; Coach: Captain: Frank Burge

Newtown; 13th season Ground: Marrickville Oval; Captain-Coach: Albert Johnston

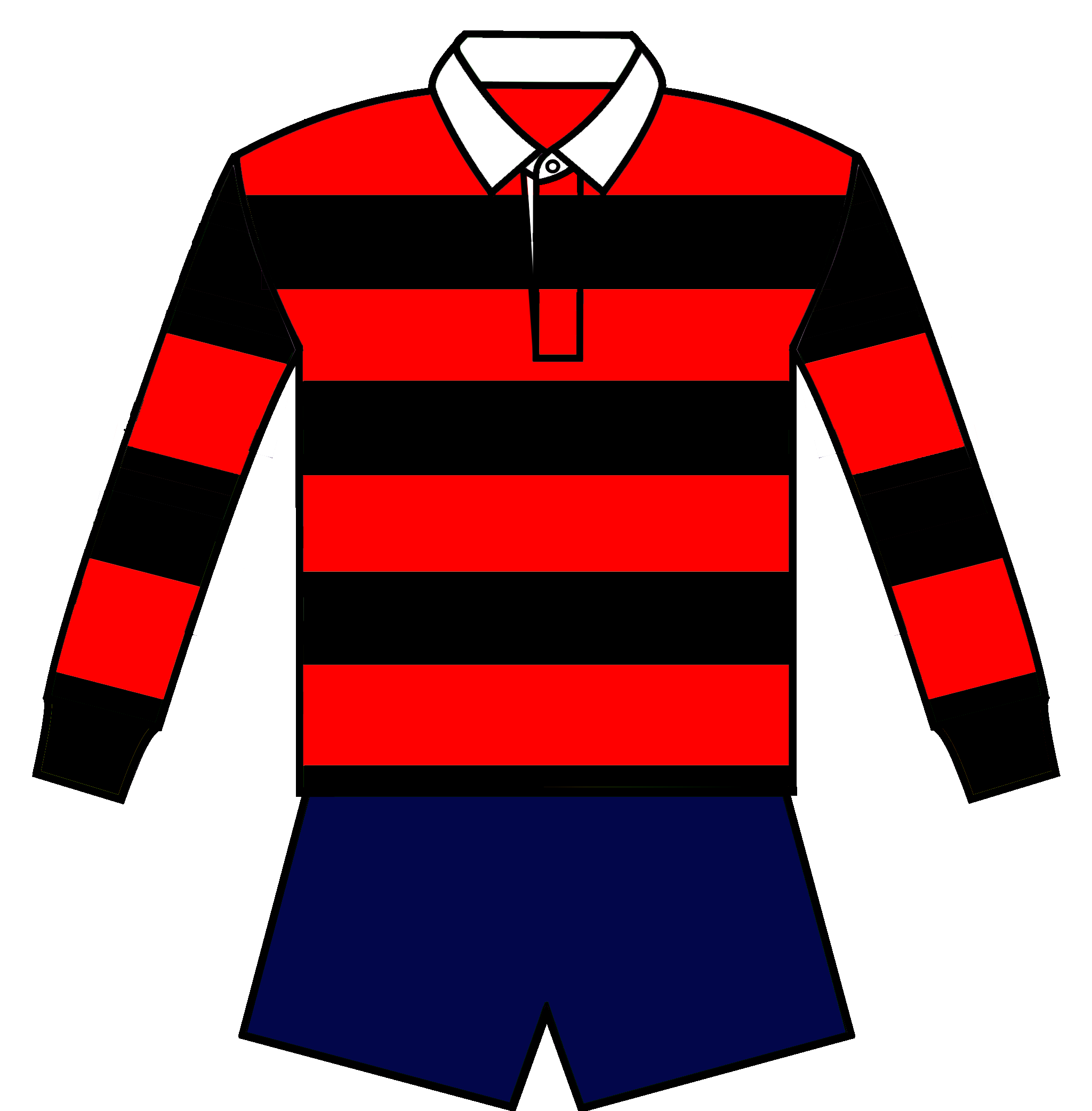
North Sydney; 13th season Ground: North Sydney Oval; Coach: Chris McKivat; Captain: Harold Horder

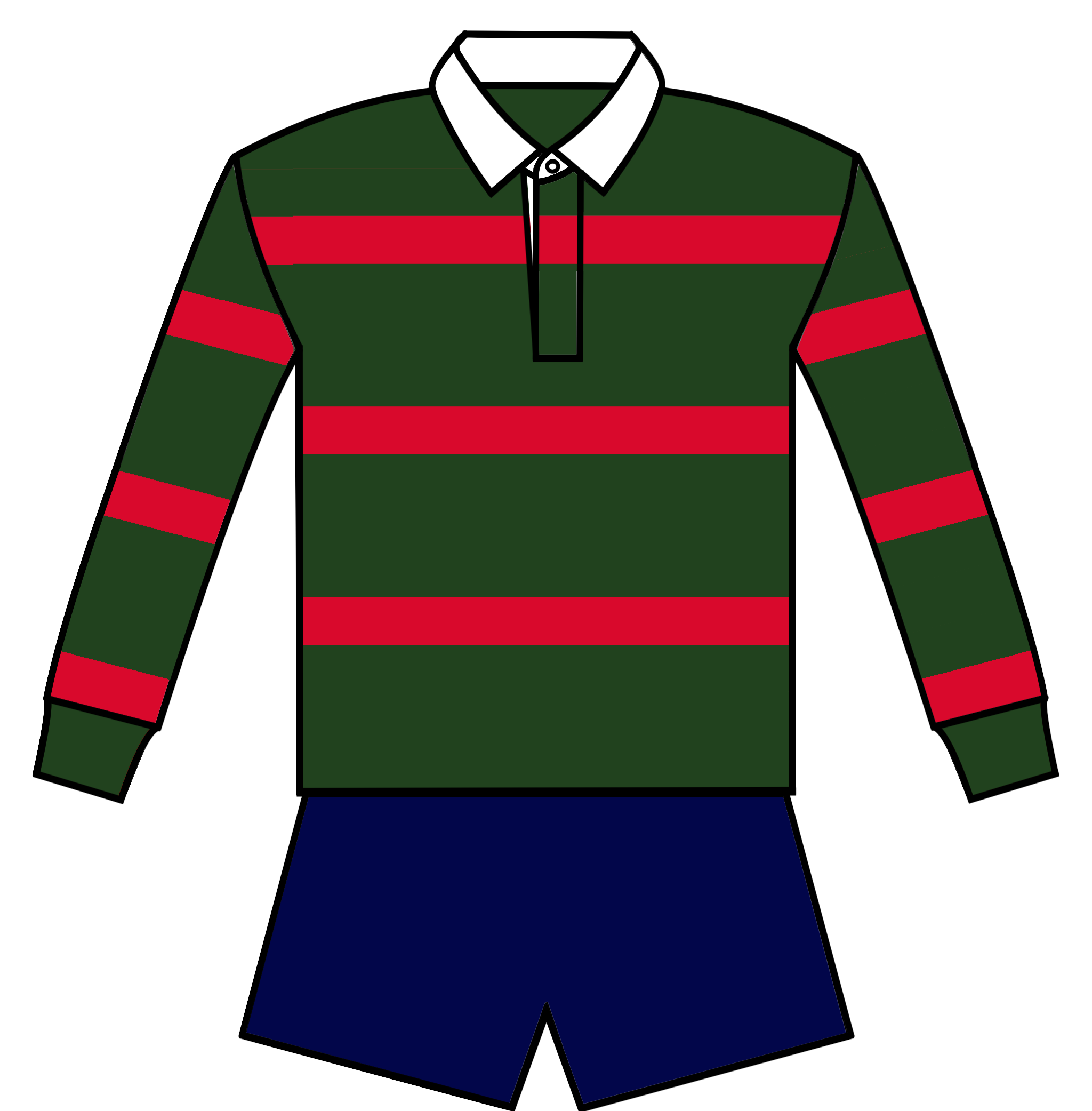
South Sydney; 13th season Ground: RAS Showground; Coach: Captain: Reg Fusedale

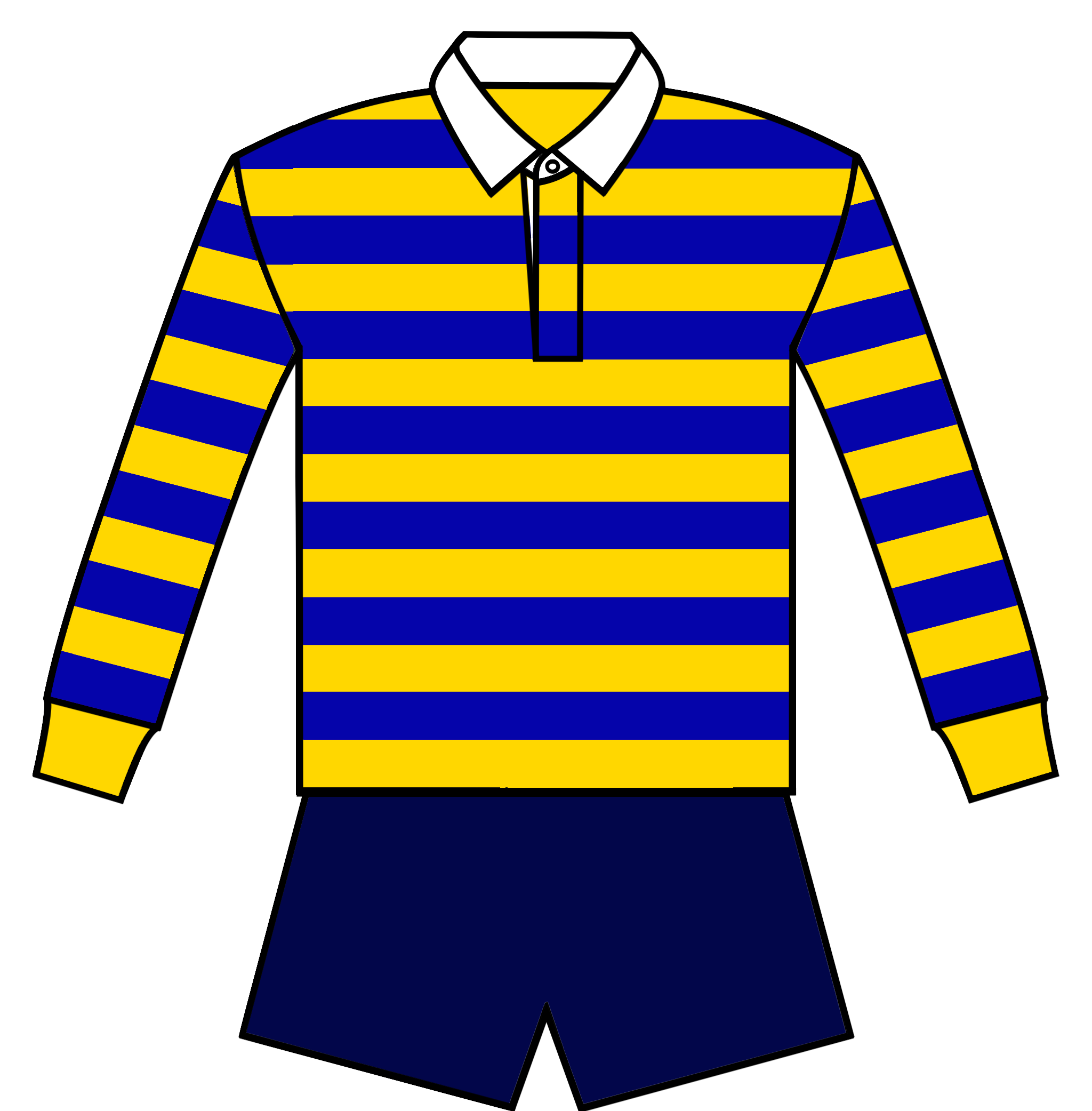
University; 1st season Coach: Paddy McCue; Captain: Alan McLeod

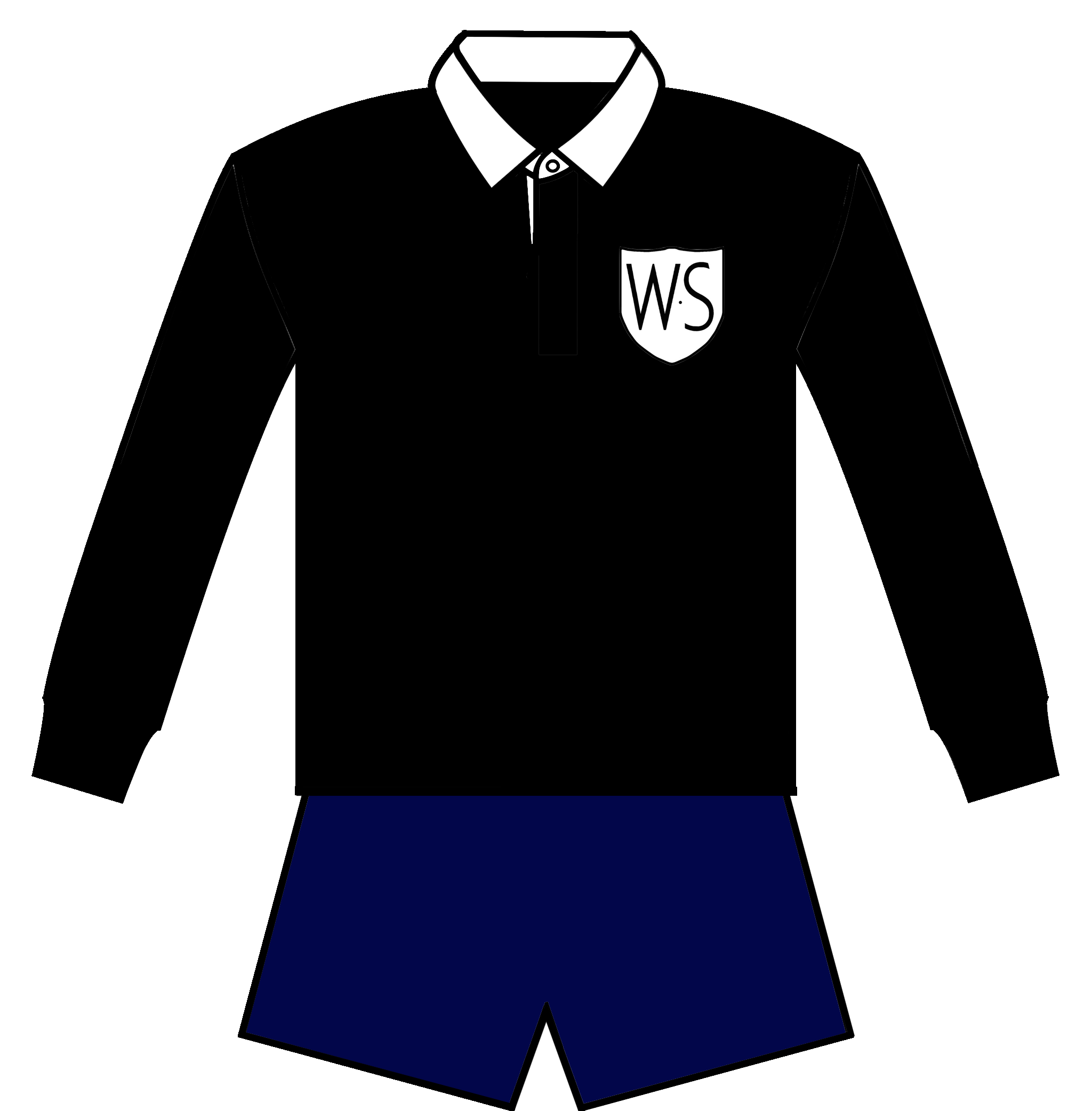
Western Suburbs; 13th season Ground: Pratten Park; Captain-coach: Tedda Courtney

== Ladder ==
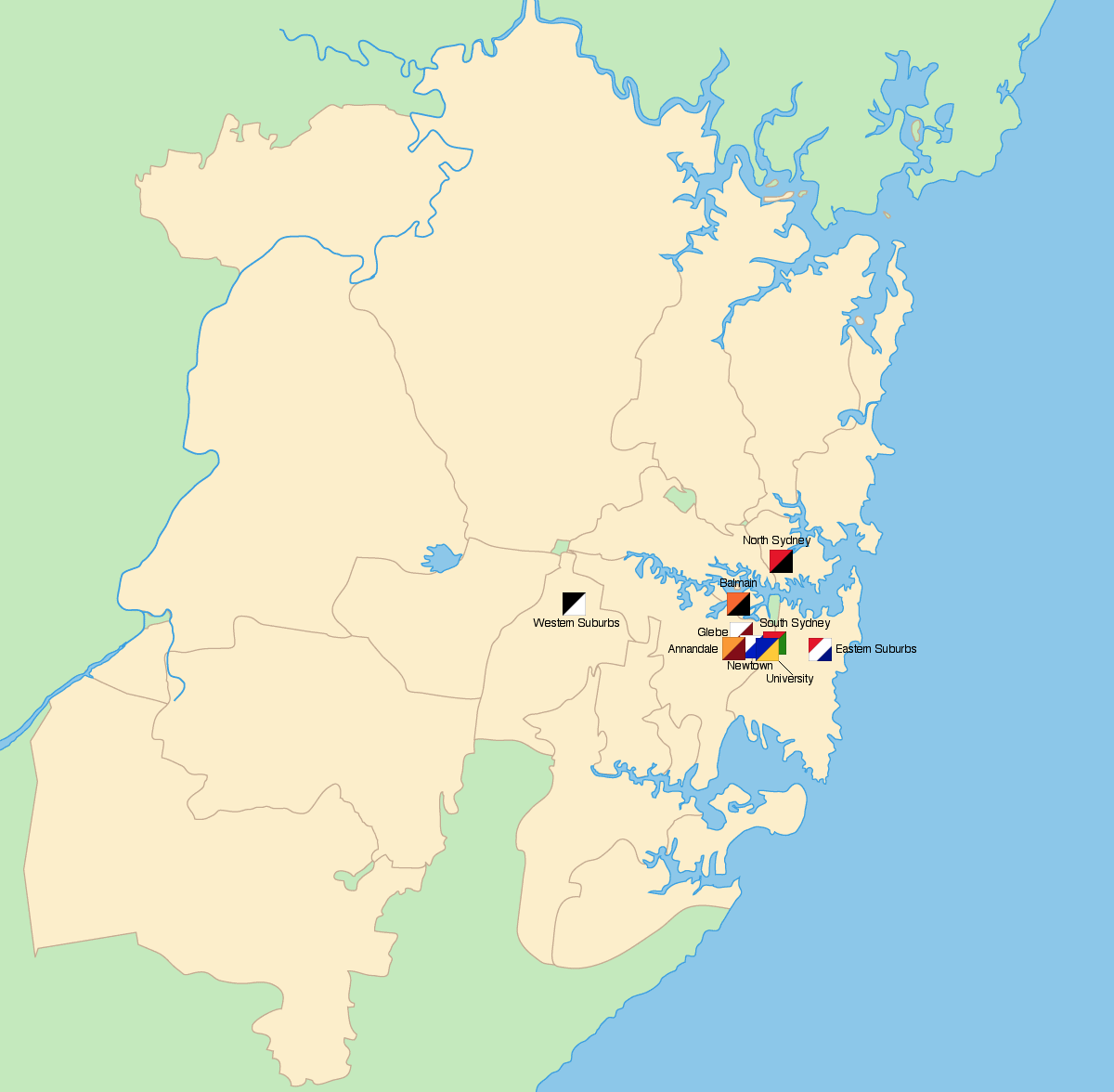
The geographical locations of the teams that contested the 1920 premiership across Sydney.

	Team	Pld	W	D	L	B	PF	PA	PD	Pts
1	Balmain	13	11	1	1	2	287	114	+173	27
2	South Sydney	13	8	0	5	2	258	149	+109	20
3	Glebe	13	8	0	5	2	268	166	+102	20
4	Western Suburbs	14	8	1	5	1	309	141	+168	19
5	North Sydney	13	7	0	6	2	237	151	+86	18
6	Eastern Suburbs	14	8	0	6	1	254	175	+79	18
7	Newtown	14	8	0	6	1	208	203	+5	18
8	Sydney University	13	1	0	12	2	101	498	-397	6
9	Annandale	13	0	0	13	2	59	384	-325	4
