= 1921 NSWRFL season =

Rugby league competition

1921 New South Wales Rugby Football League
- Teams: 9
- Premiers: North Sydney (1st title)
- Minor premiers: North Sydney (1st title)
- Matches played: 36
- Points scored: 1086
- Top points scorer(s): Rex Norman (75)
- Wooden spoon: University (1st spoon)
- Top try-scorer(s): Gordon Wright (11)

The 1921 New South Wales Rugby League premiership was the fourteenth season of Australia’s first rugby league football club competition which was based in Sydney. Nine teams from across the city contested the season, with North Sydney being crowned premiers by virtue of finishing the season on top of the League. The 1921 season also saw the St George club enter the competition, replacing the Annandale club, who after eleven seasons, exited the League.

== Season summary ==
Because the 1921–22 Kangaroo tour of Great Britain departed in mid-July only one series of nine rounds was played, with the second series being devoted to the City Cup. The premiership was decided with no finals on a first-past-the-post basis.

Premiers North Sydney became the second team to go through a season undefeated - seven wins and an 8-8 draw with Easts in round 5. Their brilliant performance earned them their maiden premiership.

University became the third team to have gone through a season winless, as Annandale had done the previous season and in 1918. University’s season yielded eight losses from eight starts, conceding 295 points at an average of 36.88 per match.

The season saw an experiment with referees instead of halfbacks feeding the scrum. Although the experiment was very quickly viewed a dismal failure and abandoned, the amendment was sometimes advocated in later years after scrums became largely uncontested.

=== Teams ===
With the addition of St George in place of the recently departed Annandale club, the number of teams in the League remained at nine.

- Balmain, formed on January 23, 1908, at Balmain Town Hall
- Eastern Suburbs, formed on January 24, 1908, at Paddington Town Hall
- Glebe, formed on January 9, 1908
- Newtown, formed on January 14, 1908
- North Sydney, formed on February 7, 1908
- South Sydney, formed on January 17, 1908, at Redfern Town Hall
- St George, formed on November 8, 1920, at Kogarah School of Arts
- Western Suburbs, formed on February 4, 1908
- University, formed in 1919 at Sydney University

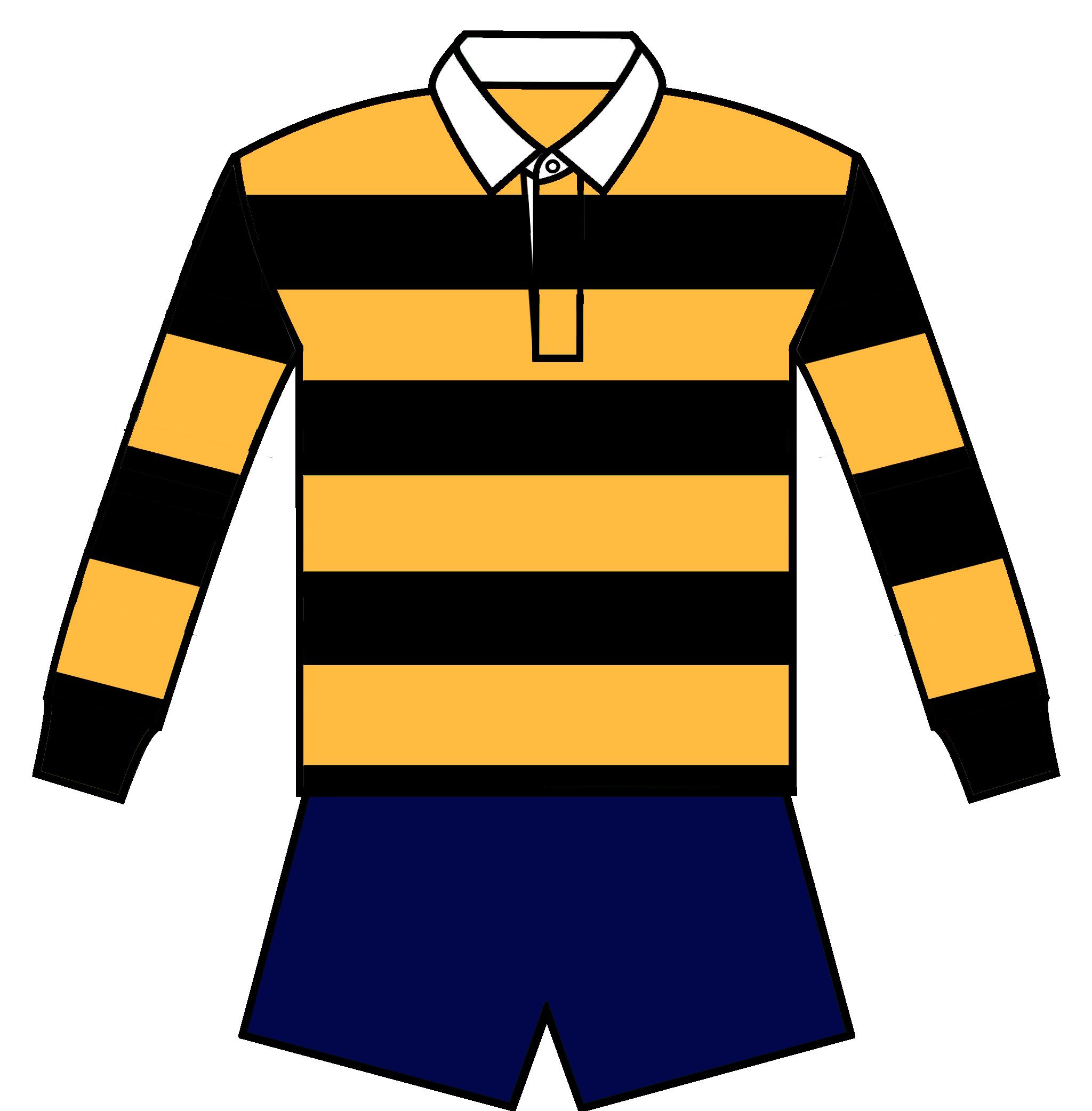
Balmain 14th season Ground: Birchgrove Oval; Captain-Coach: Charles Fraser

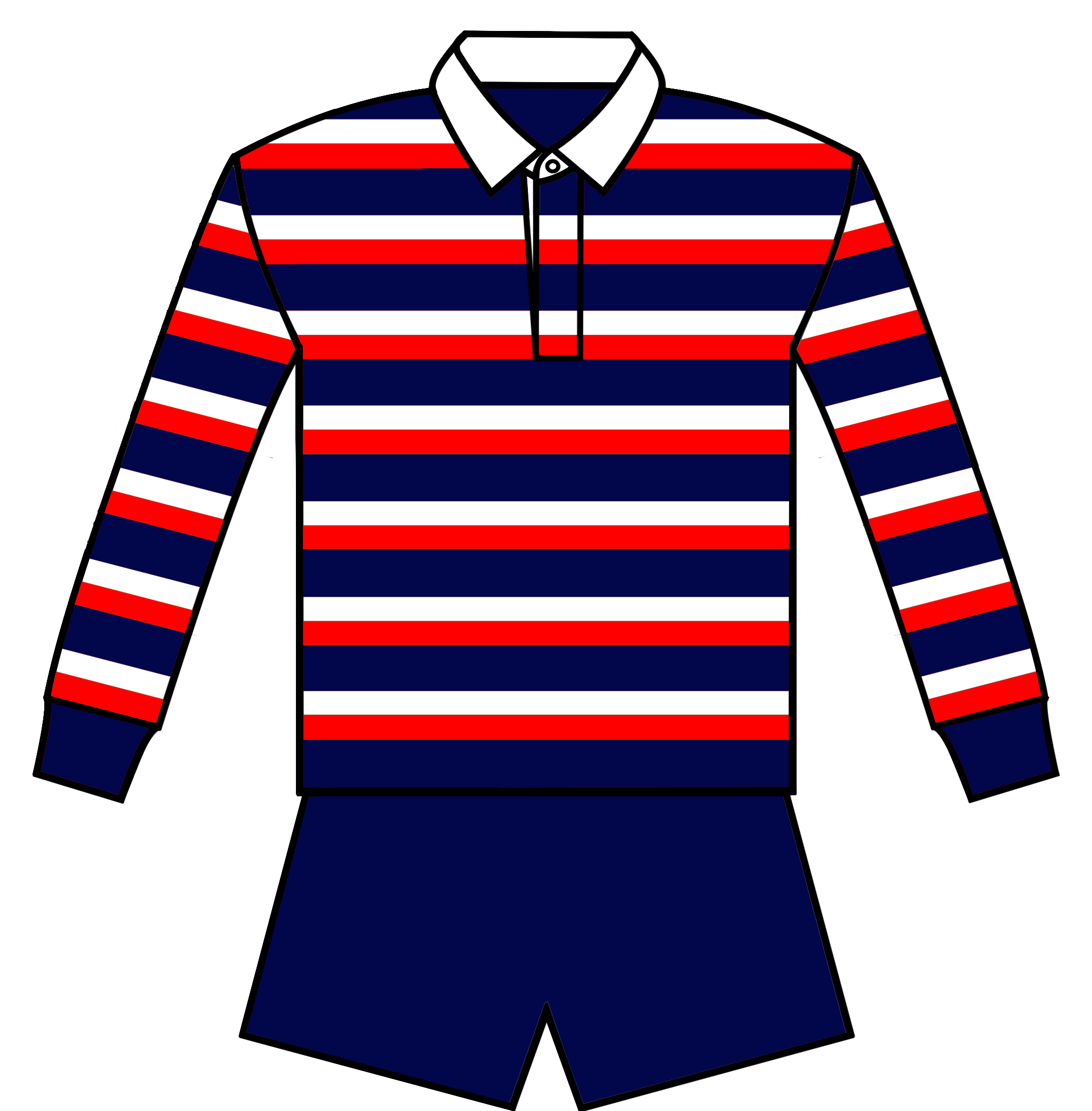
Eastern Suburbs 14th season Ground: Sydney Cricket Ground; Captain-Coach: Sandy Pearce; Captain: Harry Caples

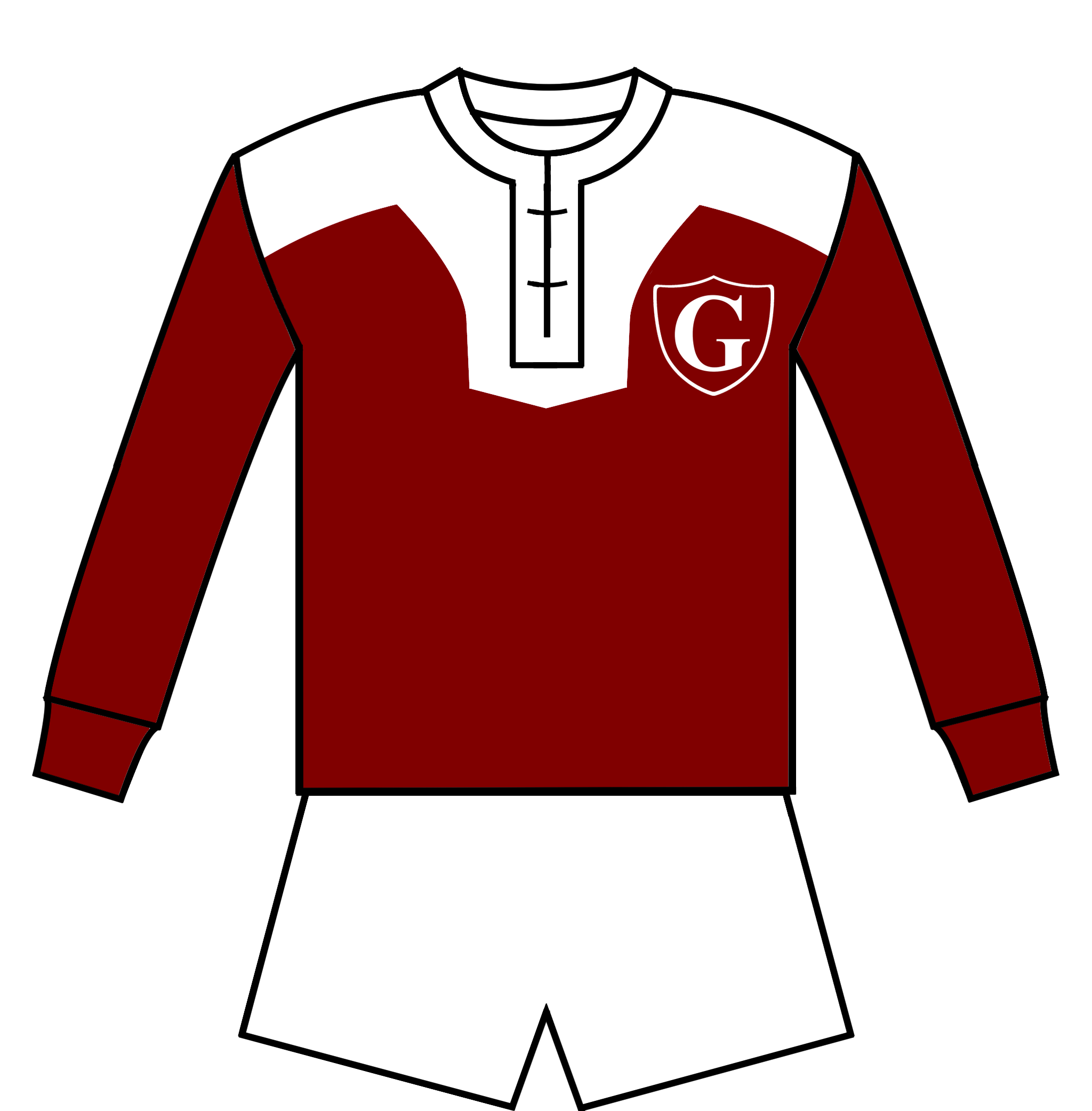
Glebe 14th season Ground: Wentworth Park; Captain: Frank Burge

Newtown 14th season Ground: Marrickville Oval; Captain: Alex Bolewski

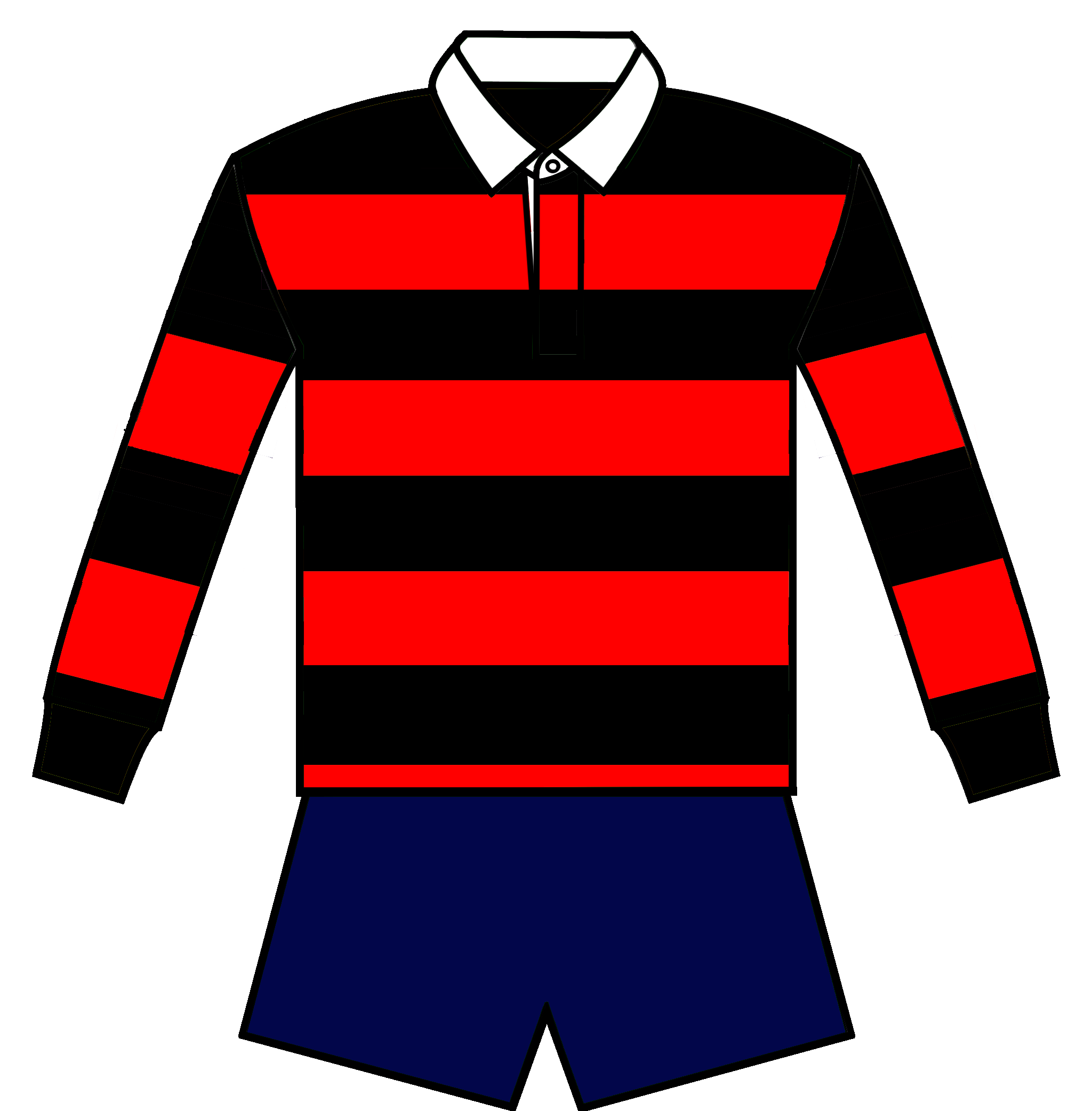
North Sydney 14th season Ground: North Sydney Oval; Coach: Chris McKivat; Captain: Harold Horder/ Duncan Thompson

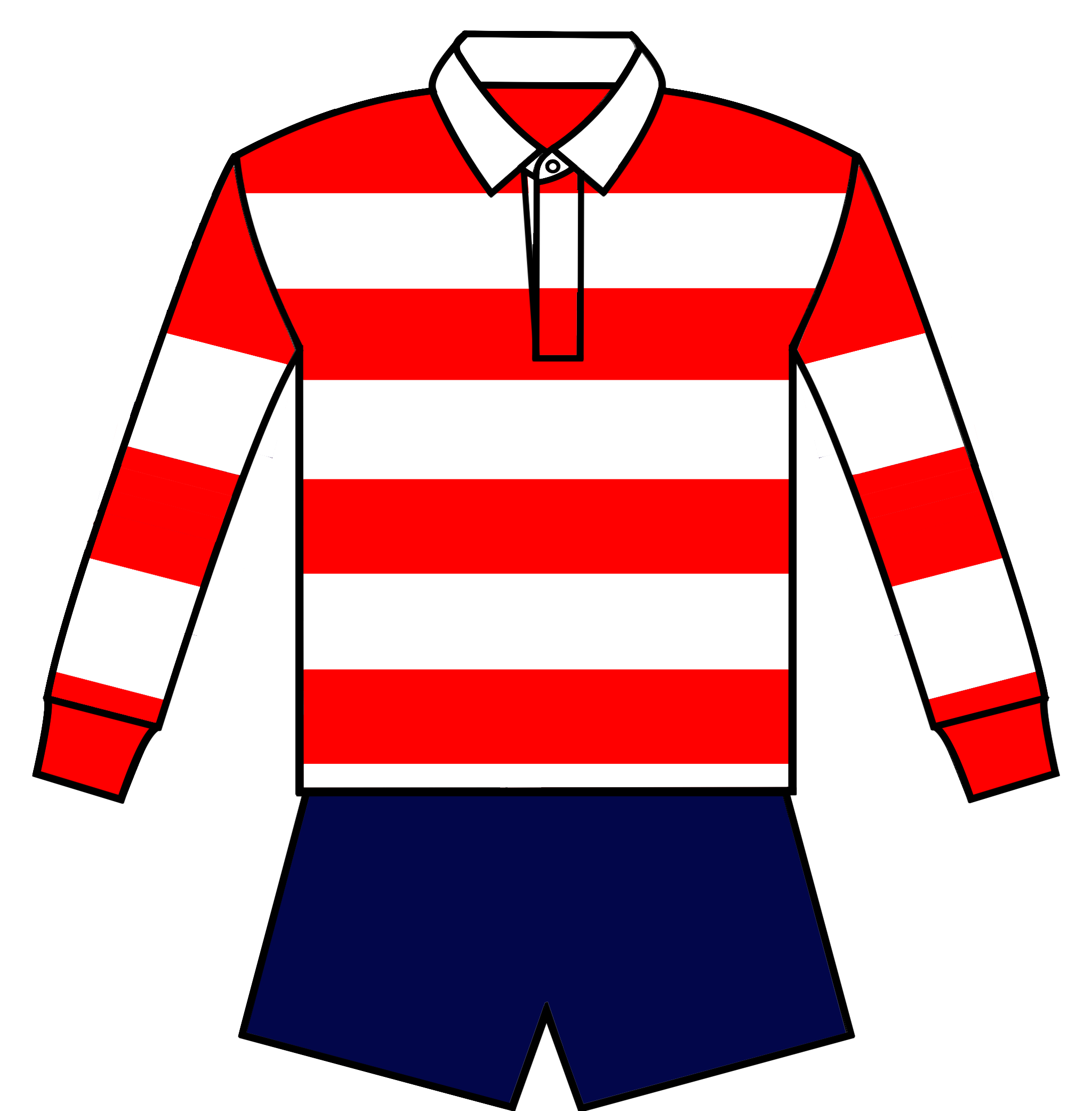
St. George 1st season Ground: Hurstville Oval; Captain-Coach Herb Gilbert

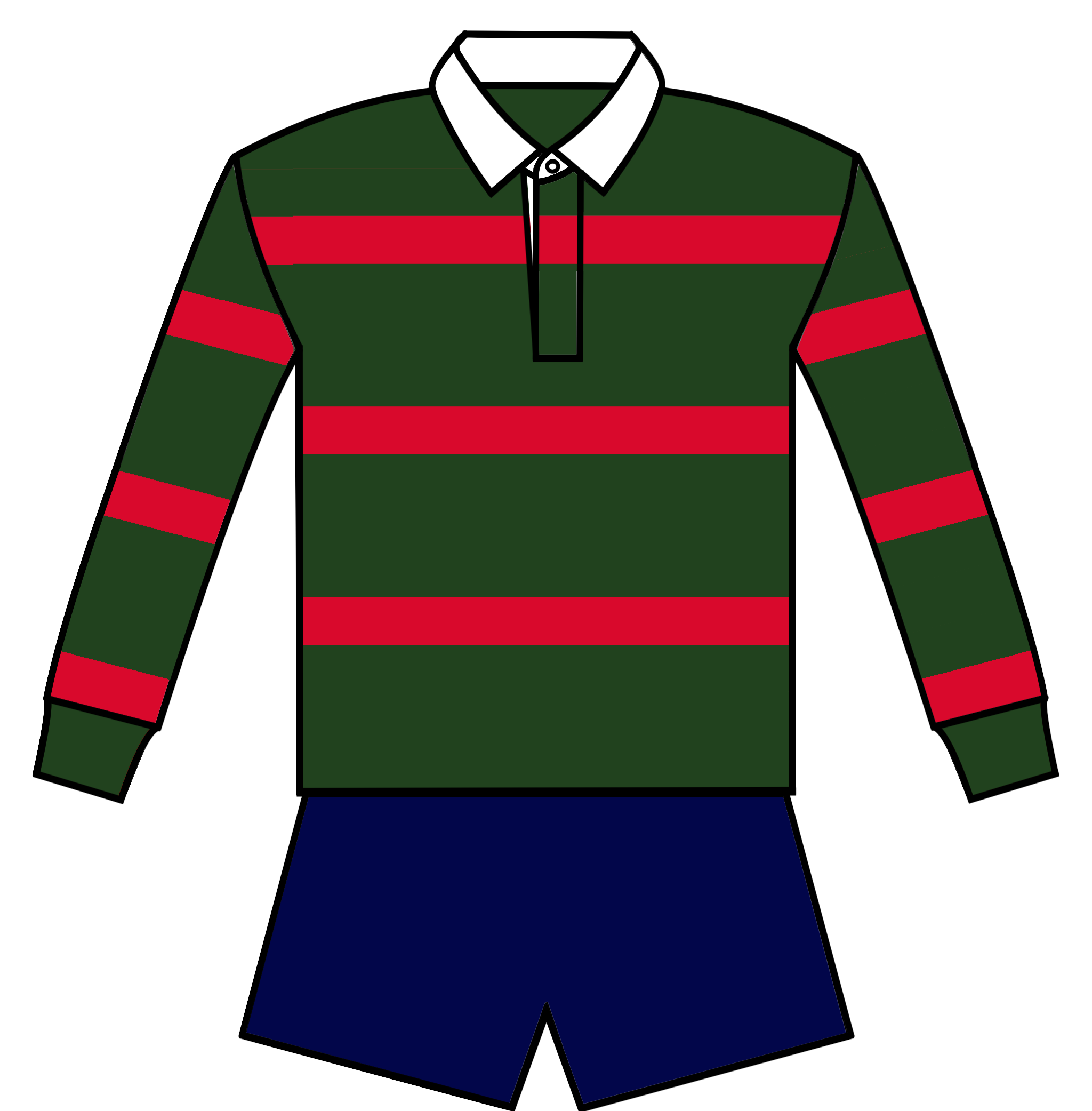
South Sydney 14th season Ground: Sydney Sports Ground; Coach: Howard Hallett; Captains:Arthur Oxford, Ted McGrath

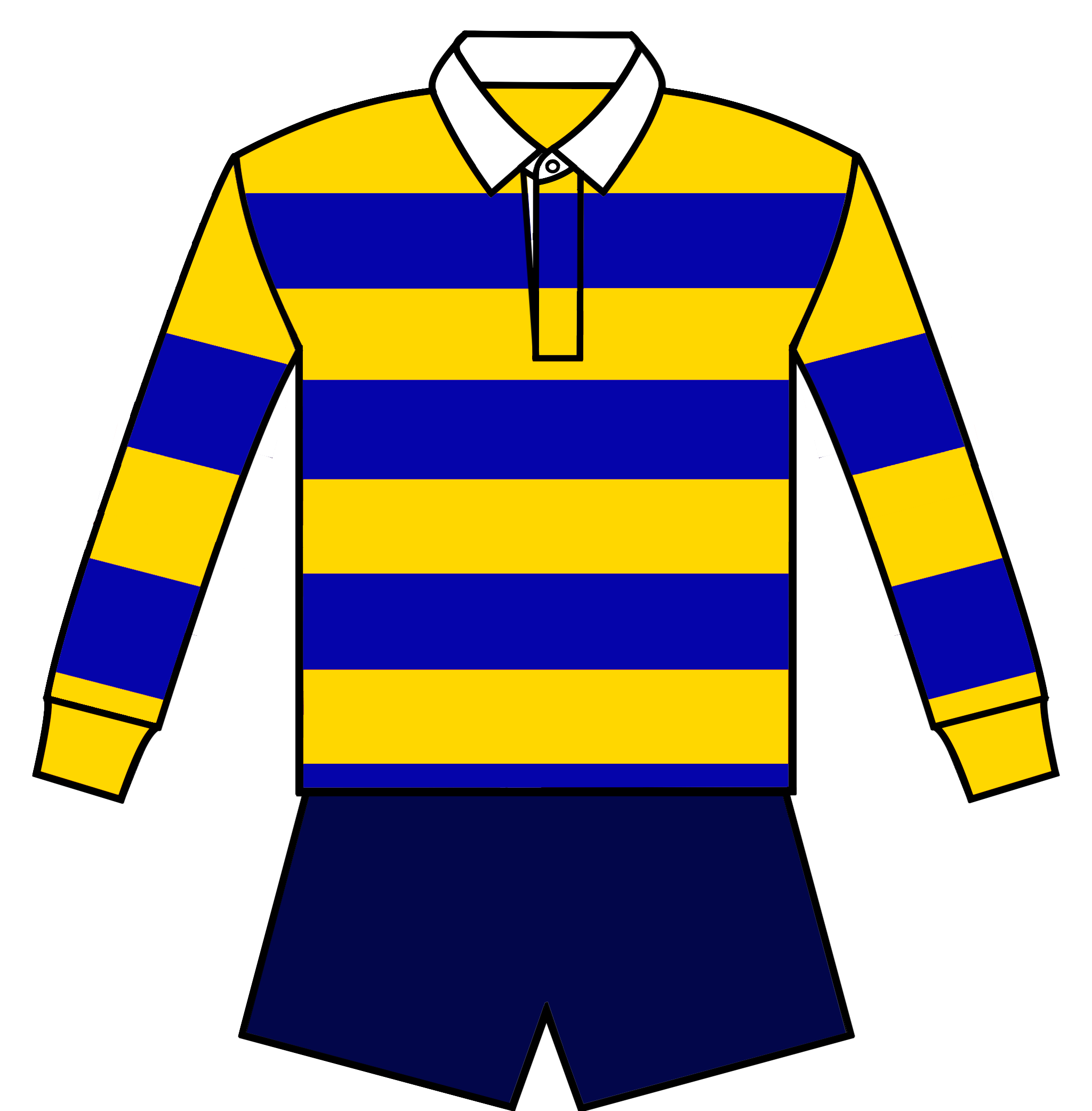
University 2nd Season; Coach: Bill Kelly; Captain: Alan McLeod

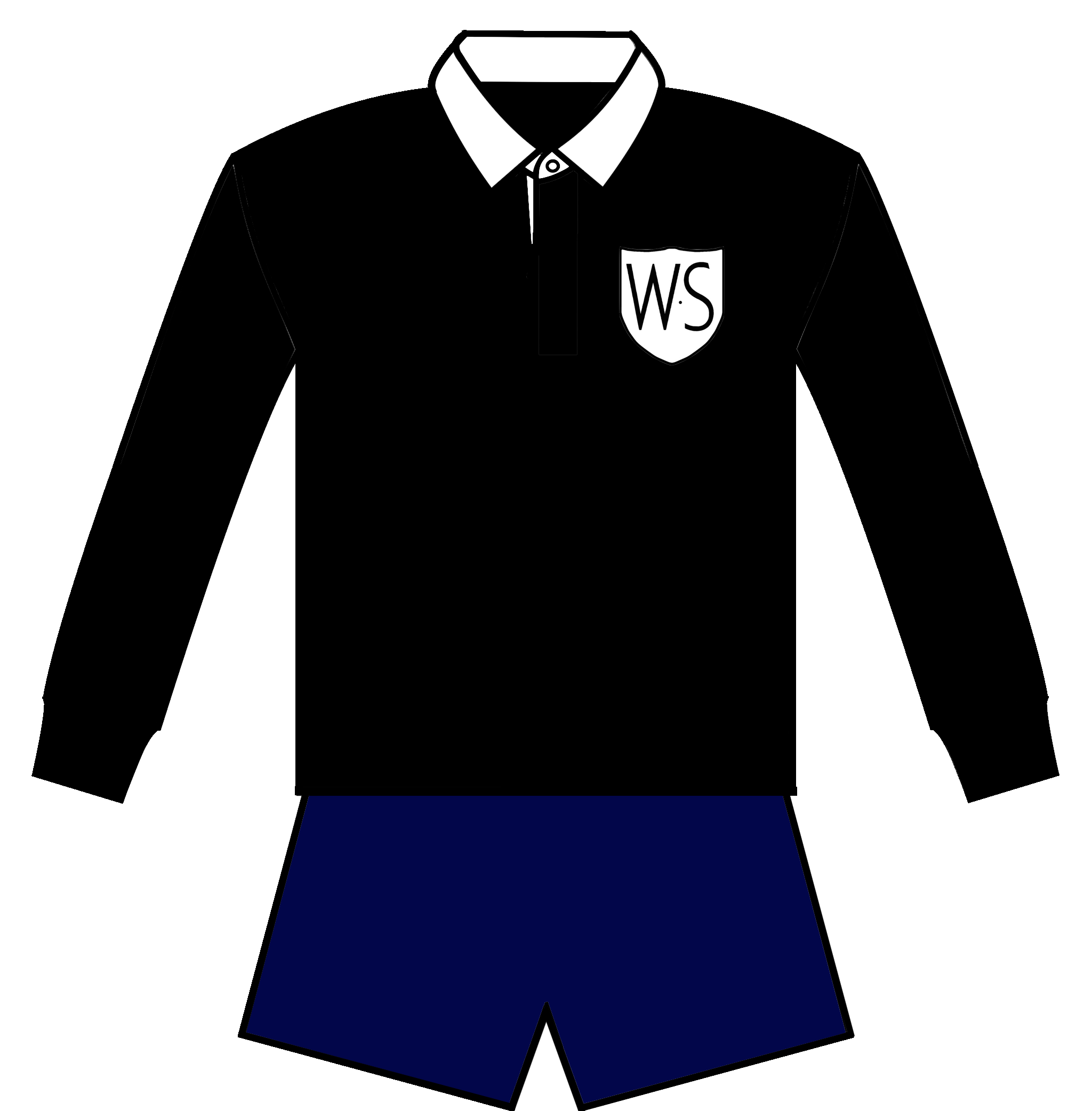
Western Suburbs 14th season Ground: Pratten Park; Captain-Coach: Viv Farnsworth

=== Ladder ===
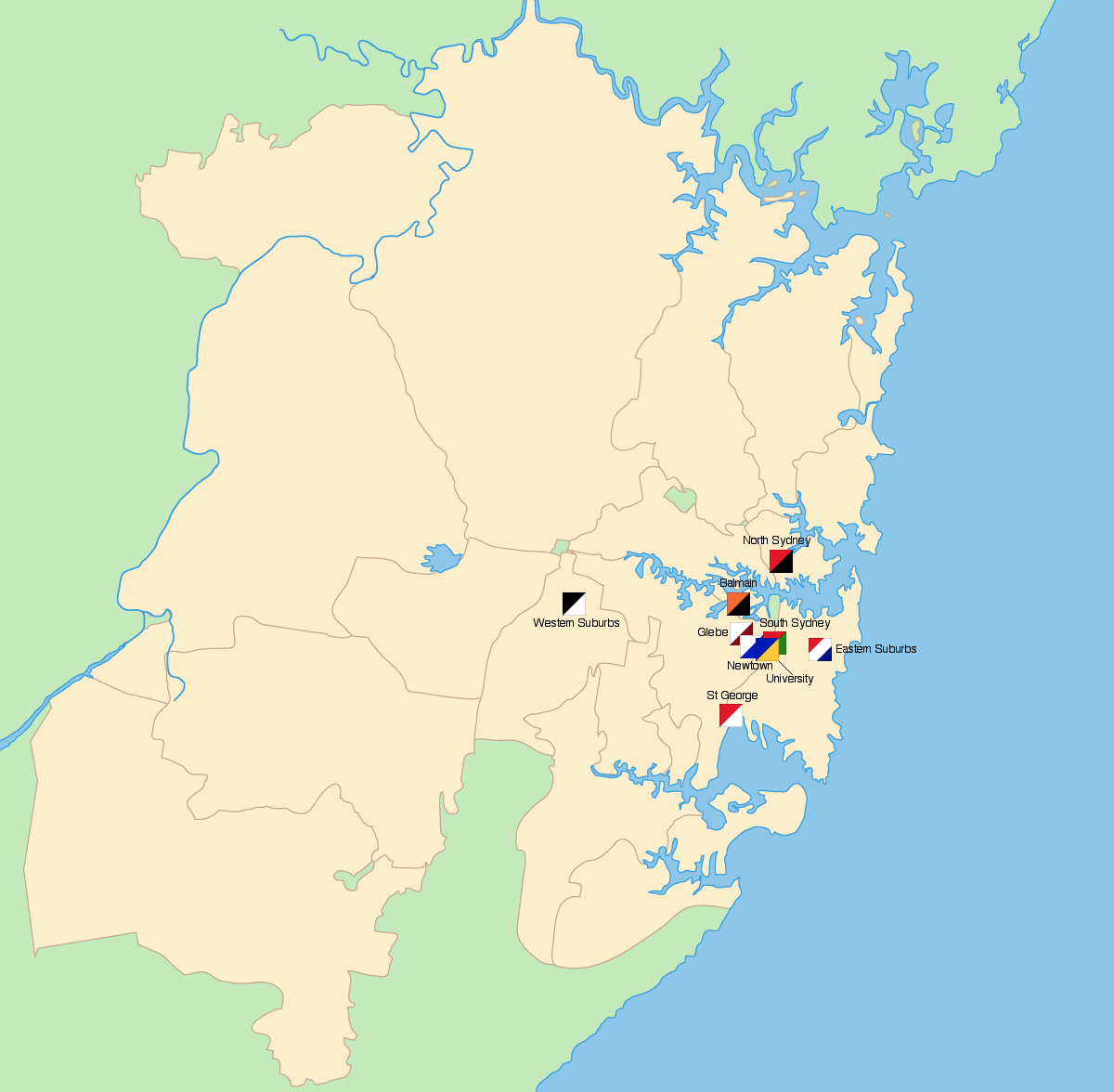
The geographical locations of the teams that contested the 1921 premiership across Sydney.

	Team	Pld	W	D	L	B	PF	PA	PD	Pts
1	North Sydney	8	7	1	0	1	172	82	+90	17
2	Eastern Suburbs	8	6	1	1	1	187	67	+120	15
3	Glebe	8	6	0	2	1	115	71	+44	14
4	Balmain	8	5	0	3	1	135	71	+64	12
5	South Sydney	8	4	0	4	1	141	104	+37	10
6	Newtown	8	3	0	5	1	77	117	-40	8
7	St George	8	2	0	6	1	87	124	-37	6
8	Western Suburbs	8	2	0	6	1	90	155	-65	6
9	Sydney University	8	0	0	8	1	82	295	-213	2
