= 2013 Sydney Roosters season =

- 2013 NRL premiers
- NRL Rank: 1st (Minor Premiers)
- Play-off result: Grand Final (Premiers)
- 2013 record: Wins: 18; draws: 0; losses: 6
- Points scored: For: 640; against: 325

Team information
- CEO: Brian Canavan
- Coach: Trent Robinson
- Captain: Anthony Minichiello
- Stadium: Allianz Stadium
- Avg. attendance: 19,378
- High attendance: 40,752

Top scorers
- Tries: Michael Jennings (20)
- Goals: James Maloney (108)
- Points: James Maloney (252)
← 2012	List of seasons	2014 →

The 2013 Sydney Roosters season was the 106th in the club's history. They competed in the 2013 National Rugby League season. The Sydney Roosters opened their 2013 season against their long-time rivals the South Sydney Rabbitohs. In 2013, Trent Robinson coached the Sydney Roosters. Anthony Minichiello captained the team in 2013 along with four vice-captains in Boyd Cordner, Jake Friend, Mitchell Pearce and Jared Waerea-Hargreaves. The Sydney Roosters completed their 2013 regular season as Minor Premiers, defeating the South Sydney Rabbitohs 24 – 12. The Sydney Roosters were crowned Premiers by defeating the Manly-Warringah Sea Eagles 26 – 18 in the 2013 NRL Grand Final.

== 2013 squad ==
Cap	Nat.	Player	Pos.	Sydney Roosters Debut	Previous club
994	(Australia)	Anthony Minichiello (C)	FB	25 February 2000
1067	(Australia)	Mitchell Aubusson	SR	19 March 2007
1069	(New Zealand)	Shaun Kenny-Dowall	CE	19 March 2007
1072	(Australia)	Mitchell Pearce (VC)	HB	24 March 2007
1074	(New Zealand)	Frank-Paul Nu'uausala	LK	25 April 2007
1083	(Australia)	Jake Friend (VC)	HK	27 June 2008
1086	(Australia)	Martin Kennedy	PR	15 March 2009
1101	(Australia)	Aidan Guerra	SR	14 March 2010
1105	(New Zealand)	Jared Waerea-Hargreaves (VC)	PR	17 April 2010	Manly-Warringah Sea Eagles
1113	(New Zealand)	Tinirau Arona	LK	3 April 2011
1119	(Australia)	Boyd Cordner (VC)	SR	4 June 2011
1123	(Australia)	Daniel Mortimer	FE	5 March 2012	Parramatta Eels
1125	(Australia)	Jack Bosden	SR	14 April 2012	St. George Illawarra Dragons
1126	(Australia)	Tautau Moga	CE	12 May 2012
1127	(New Zealand)	Adam Henry	WG	10 June 2012
1128	(New Zealand)	Nafe Seluini	HK	9 July 2012	Penrith Panthers
1129	(New Zealand)	Roger Tuivasa-Sheck	WG	27 July 2012
1130	(Australia)	Daniel Tupou	WG	18 August 2012
1131	(Australia)	Michael Jennings	CE	7 March 2013	Penrith Panthers
1132	(Australia)	James Maloney	FE	7 March 2013	New Zealand Warriors
1133	(New Zealand)	Sam Moa	PR	7 March 2013	Hull F.C.
1134	(New Zealand)	Sonny Bill Williams	SR	7 March 2013	Canterbury-Bankstown Bulldogs
1135	(Australia)	Luke O'Donnell	SR	16 March 2013	Huddersfield Giants
1136	(Australia)	Michael Oldfield	WG	7 April 2013	Manly-Warringah Sea Eagles
1137	(New Zealand)	Isaac Liu	PR	1 April 2013
1138	(Australia)	Dylan Napa	PR	21 June 2013
1139	(Australia)	Samisoni Langi	FE	19 August 2013
–	(New Zealand)	Josh Ailaomai	PR	Yet to Debut
–	(Australia)	Kane Evans	PR	Yet to Debut
–	(Australia)	Rhyse Martin	SR	Yet to Debut
–	(Australia)	Jack Siejka	SR	Yet to Debut
-	(New Zealand)	David Kairua	FB	Yet to Debut
–	(Australia)	Brandon Tago	PR	Yet to Debut
–	(New Zealand)	Henare Wells	FB	Yet to Debut

=== Squad movements ===
Gains
Player	Signed From
Michael Jennings	Penrith Panthers
James Maloney	New Zealand Warriors
Sam Moa	Hull F.C.
Luke O'Donnell	Huddersfield Giants
Sonny Bill Williams	Panasonic Wild Knights

Losses
Player	Signed With
Braith Anasta	Wests Tigers
Justin Carney	Castleford Tigers
Anthony Cherrington	Penrith Panthers
Joseph Leilua	Newcastle Knights
Mose Masoe	Penrith Panthers
Tom Symonds	Manly-Warringah Sea Eagles
Peni Tagive	Retired
Brad Takairangi	Gold Coast Titans

== 2013 results ==
=== Pre-season ===
16 February 2013 Game 1	Sydney Roosters	20–4	Manly-Warringah Sea Eagles	Gosford
7:30 PM	Tupou 4'; Jennings 14'; Liu ?'; Langi 70'; Maloney Goals 2/4		Gagan ?'; Chisholm Goals 0/1	Stadium: Bluetongue Stadium; Attendance: Unknown; Referee: Unknown

23 February 2013 Game 2	Sydney Roosters	28–16	Wests Tigers	Sydney
7:30 PM	Cordner 17'; Tupou 19'; Mortimer 49'; Jennings ?'; Guerra 68'; Maloney Goals 4/5	Statistics	Marshall 40'; Reddy ?'; Utai ?'; Marshall Goals 2/3	Stadium: Allianz Stadium; Attendance: 3,800; Referee: Unknown

=== Regular season ===
7 March 2013 Round 1	Sydney Roosters	10–28	South Sydney Rabbitohs	Sydney
8:05 PM	Maloney 3'; Williams 75'; Maloney Goals 1/2	Statistics	Merritt 10, 28, 61'; McQueen 40'; G. Burgess 46'; Reynolds Goals 4/5	Stadium: Allianz Stadium; Attendance: 35,952; Referee: Ben Cummins, Chris James

16 March 2013 Round 2	New Zealand Warriors	14–16	Sydney Roosters	Auckland
7:30 PM	Johnson 51'; Godinet 59'; Tupou 75'; Johnson Goals 1/3	Statistics	Minichiello 5'; Aubusson 42'; Kenny-Dowall 46'; Maloney Goals 2/3	Stadium: Eden Park; Attendance: 32,740; Referee: Ashley Klein, Phil Haines

23 March 2013 Round 3	Sydney Roosters	8–0	Brisbane Broncos	Sydney
7:30 PM	Maloney 31'; Maloney Goals 2/2	Statistics		Stadium: Allianz Stadium; Attendance: 13,168; Referee: Gerard Sutton, Brett Suttor

1 April 2013 Round 4	Sydney Roosters	50–0	Parramatta Eels	Sydney
7:00 PM	Waerea-Hargreaves 12'; Williams 18'; Tuivasa-Sheck 28, 35, 63'; Jennings 45'; Mortimer 69'; Tupou 72'; Cordner 78'; Maloney Goals 7/9	Statistics		Stadium: Allianz Stadium; Attendance: 18,014; Referee: Ben Cummins, Chris James

7 April 2013 Round 5	Canberra Raiders	24–22	Sydney Roosters	Canberra
6:30 PM	Lee 45'; Williams 50'; Earl 66'; Croker 76'; Croker Goals 4/4	Statistics	Maloney 20'; Oldfield 30'; Aubusson 35'; Minichiello 54'; Maloney Goals 3/4	Stadium: Canberra Stadium; Attendance: 10,969; Referee: Matt Cecchin, Luke Phillips

12 April 2013 Round 6	Sydney Roosters	38–0	Canterbury-Bankstown Bulldogs	Sydney
7:35 PM	Tuivasa-Sheck 9'; Williams 48, 62'; Mortimer 54'; Maloney 69'; Jennings 72'; Maloney Goals 7/7	Statistics		Stadium: Allianz Stadium; Attendance: 22,552; Referee: Ben Cummins, Gavin Morris

25 April 2013 Round 7	Sydney Roosters	34–10	St. George Illawarra Dragons	Sydney
4:00 PM	Aubusson 15'; Jennings 18, 61'; Minichiello 21'; Kennedy 34'; Tupou 51'; Maloney Goals 5/6	Statistics	Nightingale 4'; Cooper 72'; Soward Goals 1/2	Stadium: Allianz Stadium; Attendance: 40,752; Referee: Shayne Hayne, Gerard Sutton

5 May 2013 Round 8	Sydney Roosters	30–6	Penrith Panthers	Sydney
3:00 PM	Friend 5'; Williams 34'; Jennings 51, 63'; Pearce 70'; Maloney Goals 5/6	Statistics	Moylan 11'; Walsh Goals 1/1	Stadium: Allianz Stadium; Attendance: 11,176; Referee: Jared Maxwell, Luke Phillips

13 May 2013 Round 9	Manly-Warringah Sea Eagles	4–16	Sydney Roosters	Sydney
7:00 PM	Matai 46'; Lyon Goals 0/1	Statistics	Jennings 11'; Friend 79'; Maloney Goals 4/4	Stadium: Brookvale Oval; Attendance: 12,950; Referee: Matt Cecchin, Henry Perenara

18 May 2013 Round 10	North Queensland Cowboys	8–12	Sydney Roosters	Townsville
7:30 PM	Lui 33'; Thurston Goals 2/3	Statistics	Minichiello 23'; Aubusson 65'; Maloney Goals 2/2	Stadium: 1300SMILES Stadium; Attendance: 13,666; Referee: Ashley Klein, Gavin Reynolds

25 May 2013 Round 11	Sydney Roosters	18–26	Melbourne Storm	Sydney
7:30 PM	O'Donnell 25'; Jennings 36'; Tuivasa-Sheck 77'; Maloney Goals 3/3	Statistics	O'Neill 4'; Blair 14'; Smith 39'; Chambers 62'; Smith Goals 5/6	Stadium: Allianz Stadium; Attendance: 19,164; Referee: Shayne Hayne, Ashley Klein

Round 12	BYE

7 June 2013 Round 13	Parramatta Eels	24–38	Sydney Roosters	Sydney
7:45 PM	Sio 14'; Mullaney 18'; Hayne 46'; Terepo 71'; Sandow Goals 4/4	Statistics	Tupou 7, 33'; Kennedy 22'; Tuivasa-Sheck 30'; Minichiello 74'; Kenny-Dowall 76'; Maloney Goals 7/7	Stadium: Parramatta Stadium; Attendance: 12,135; Referee: Adam Devcich, Gavin Morris

16 June 2013 Round 14	Sydney Roosters	12–23	New Zealand Warriors	Sydney
7:30 PM	Minichiello 36'; Williams 40'; Maloney Goals 2/2	Statistics	Taylor 4'; Laumape 17'; Fisiiahi 58'; Vatuvei 70'; Mateo Goals 3/3; Johnson Field Goal 1/1	Stadium: Allianz Stadium; Attendance: 11,040; Referee: Ashley Klein, Chris James

21 June 2013 Round 15	Canterbury-Bankstown Bulldogs	18–20	Sydney Roosters	Sydney
7:00 PM	Barba 19'; Halatau 71'; Inu 79'; Hodkinson Goals 3/3	Statistics	Kenny-Dowall 5, 48'; Cordner 26, 61'; Mortimer Goals 2/4	Stadium: ANZ Stadium; Attendance: 20,273; Referee: Matt Cecchin, Gavin Badger

1 July 2013 Round 16	Sydney Roosters	18–12	Manly-Warringah Sea Eagles	Sydney
6:00 PM	Tuivasa-Sheck 6'; Friend 26'; Jennings 53, 69'; Pearce Goals 0/1; Cordner Goals 1/4	Statistics	Lyon 48'; Rose 77'; Lyon Goals 2/2	Stadium: Allianz Stadium; Attendance: 16,246; Referee: Matt Cecchin, Gavin Morris

6 July 2013 Round 17	St. George Illawarra Dragons	0–36	Sydney Roosters	Sydney
2:30 PM		Statistics	Maloney 3'; Cordner 12'; Jennings 33'; Kenny-Dowall 48'; Guerra 54'; Tupou 59'; Maloney Goals 6/6	Stadium: WIN Jubilee Oval; Attendance: 11,857; Referee: Adam Devcich, Chris James

Round 18	BYE

20 July 2013 Round 19	Sydney Roosters	40–0	Cronulla-Sutherland Sharks	Sydney
7:00 PM	Cordner 2, 39'; Friend 8'; Tupou 16'; Kenny-Dowall 20'; Moa 50'; Aubusson 60'; Maloney Goals 6/7	Statistics		Stadium: Allianz Stadium; Attendance: 13,706; Referee: Matt Cecchin, Henry Perenara

28 July 2013 Round 20	Newcastle Knights	12–28	Sydney Roosters	Newcastle
3:00 PM	Boyd 21'; McManus 60'; Roberts Goals 2/3	Statistics	Kenny-Dowall 18'; Jennings 31'; Moa 48'; Cordner 72'; Williams 76'; Maloney Goals 4/5	Stadium: Hunter Stadium; Attendance: 22,847; Referee: Jared Maxwell, Gavin Morris

2 August 2013 Round 21	Penrith Panthers	6–42	Sydney Roosters	Sydney
7:35 PM	Simmons 3'; Walsh Goals 1/1	Statistics	Tupou 12'; Friend 32'; Cordner 42, 79'; Guerra 49'; Maloney 54'; Tuivasa-Sheck 59'; Maloney Goals 7/7	Stadium: Centrebet Stadium; Attendance: 11,879; Referee: Shayne Hayne, Jason Robinson

10 August 2013 Round 22	Sydney Roosters	28–22	Canberra Raiders	Sydney
5:30 PM	Maloney 12'; Jennings 23, 35'; Kenny-Dowall 42'; Tupou 48'; Maloney Goals 4/5	Statistics	Edwards 20'; Ferguson 39, 74'; Earl 54'; Croker Goals 3/4	Stadium: Allianz Stadium; Attendance: 13,223; Referee: Gavin Badger, Alan Shortall

19 August 2013 Round 23	Wests Tigers	14–56	Sydney Roosters	Sydney
7:00 PM	Tuqiri 12'; Tedesco 71'; Sironen 78'; Marshall Goals 1/3	Statistics	Friend 4'; Williams 25'; Mortimer 45, 47'; Tupou 52'; Pearce 57, 64'; Jennings 60, 74'; Maloney Goals 10/10	Stadium: Allianz Stadium; Attendance: 8,393; Referee: Gerard Sutton, Phil Haines

26 August 2013 Round 24	Cronulla-Sutherland Sharks	32–22	Sydney Roosters	Sydney
7:00 PM	Gallen 3'; Gordon 31'; Wright 36'; Heighington 39'; Carney Goals 8/8	Statistics	Tupou 47, 69'; Mortimer 51'; Jennings 77'; Maloney Goals 3/4	Stadium: Remondis Stadium; Attendance: 11,418; Referee: Ashley Klein, Henry Perenara

1 September 2013 Round 25	Sydney Roosters	22–30	Gold Coast Titans	Sydney
3:00 PM	Aubusson 11'; Pearce 37'; Tupou 59'; Moa 63'; Maloney Goals 3/4	Statistics	Michaels 2'; Falloon 8'; Don 50'; Takairangi 73'; Taylor 80'; Sezer Goals 5/5	Stadium: Allianz Stadium; Attendance: 17,542; Referee: Matt Cecchin, David Munro

6 September 2013 Round 26	South Sydney Rabbitohs	12–24	Sydney Roosters	Sydney
7:45 PM	Inglis 12'; Clark 36'; Reynolds Goals 2/2	Statistics	Maloney 19, 57'; Guerra 22'; Pearce 60'; Maloney Goals 4/5	Stadium: ANZ Stadium; Attendance: 59,708; Referee: Matt Cecchin, Ashley Klein

=== Finals ===
14 September 2013 Qualifying	Sydney Roosters	4–0	Manly-Warringah Sea Eagles	Sydney
7:00 PM	Tuivasa-Sheck 10'; Maloney Goals 0/1	Statistics		Stadium: Allianz Stadium; Attendance: 32,747; Referee: Ben Cummins, Gerard Sutton

28 September 2013 Preliminary	Sydney Roosters	40–14	Newcastle Knights	Sydney
7:45 PM	Tupou 31'; Jennings 34,52'; Guerra 48,80'; Aubusson 57'; Friend 61'; Maloney Goals 6/8	Statistics	Leilua 66,68'; Roberts Goals 3/4	Stadium: Allianz Stadium; Attendance: 37,752; Referee: Shayne Hayne, Ashley Klein

6 October 2013 Grand Final	Sydney Roosters	26–18	Manly-Warringah Sea Eagles	Sydney
7:15 PM	Tupou 25'; Guerra 55'; Kenny-Dowall 60'; Jennings 72'; Maloney Goals 5/5	Statistics	Taufua 9'; Lyon 43'; Matai 49'; Lyon Goals 3/4	Stadium: ANZ Stadium; Attendance: 81,491; Referee: Shayne Hayne, Ben Cummins

== Ladder ==
2013 NRL season
Pos	Team	Pld	W	D	L	B	PF	PA	PD	Pts
1	Sydney Roosters (P)	24	18	0	6	2	640	325	+315	40
2	South Sydney Rabbitohs	24	18	0	6	2	588	384	+204	40
3	Melbourne Storm	24	16	1	7	2	589	373	+216	37
4	Manly Warringah Sea Eagles	24	15	1	8	2	588	366	+222	35
5	Cronulla-Sutherland Sharks	24	14	0	10	2	468	460	+8	32
6	Canterbury-Bankstown Bulldogs	24	13	0	11	2	529	463	+66	30
7	Newcastle Knights	24	12	1	11	2	528	422	+106	29
8	North Queensland Cowboys	24	12	0	12	2	507	431	+76	28
9	Gold Coast Titans	24	11	0	13	2	500	518	−18	26
10	Penrith Panthers	24	11	0	13	2	495	532	−37	26
11	New Zealand Warriors	24	11	0	13	2	495	554	−59	26
12	Brisbane Broncos	24	10	1	13	2	434	477	−43	25
13	Canberra Raiders	24	10	0	14	2	434	624	−190	24
14	St. George Illawarra Dragons	24	7	0	17	2	379	530	−151	18
15	Wests Tigers	24	7	0	17	2	386	687	−301	18
16	Parramatta Eels	24	5	0	19	2	326	740	−414	14

== Player statistics ==
Player	Appearances	Tries	Goals	Field Goals	Total Points
Tinirau Arona	3	–	–	–	–
Mitchell Aubusson	26	7	–	–	28
Boyd Cordner	20	9	1	–	38
Jake Friend	27	7	–	–	28
Aidan Guerra	22	6	–	–	24
Michael Jennings	26	20	–	–	80
Martin Kennedy	16	2	–	–	8
Shaun Kenny-Dowall	27	9	–	–	36
Samisoni Langi	2	–	–	–	–
Isaac Liu	15	–	–	–	–
James Maloney	25	9	108	–	252
Anthony Minichiello	24	6	–	–	24
Sam Moa	23	3	–	–	12
Daniel Mortimer	27	5	2	–	24
Dylan Napa	7	–	–	–	–
Frank-Paul Nu'uausala	23	–	–	–	–
Luke O'Donnell	20	1	–	–	4
Michael Oldfield	1	1	–	–	4
Mitchell Pearce	26	5	–	–	20
Nafe Seluini	1	–	–	–	–
Lama Tasi	2	–	–	–	–
Roger Tuivasa-Sheck	25	9	–	–	36
Daniel Tupou	26	14	–	–	56
Jared Waerea-Hargreaves	21	1	–	–	4
Sonny Bill Williams	24	8	–	–	32
25	27	122	111	0	710

== Representative honours ==
Player	All Stars	ANZAC Test	Pacific Test	City / Country	State of Origin 1	State of Origin 2	State of Origin 3	World Cup
Tinirau Arona								Cook Islands
Boyd Cordner				Country			New South Wales	Australia
Kane Evans								Fiji
Aidan Guerra								Italy
Michael Jennings				City	New South Wales	New South Wales	New South Wales	Australia
Shaun Kenny-Dowall	NRL All Stars	New Zealand						
Samisoni Langi			Tonga					Tonga
James Maloney				Country	New South Wales	New South Wales	New South Wales	
Anthony Minichiello								Italy
Sam Moa			Tonga					New Zealand
Dylan Napa								Cook Islands
Frank-Paul Nu'uausala								New Zealand
Michael Oldfield			Tonga					
Mitchell Pearce					New South Wales	New South Wales	New South Wales	
Nafe Seluini			Tonga					Tonga
Lama Tasi			Samoa					
Roger Tuivasa-Sheck								New Zealand
Daniel Tupou								Tonga
Jared Waerea-Hargreaves		New Zealand						New Zealand
Sonny Bill Williams								New Zealand
