= Charlie Cubitt =

Australian rugby league player (1890–1968)

Personal information
- Full name: Charles Rupert Cubitt
- Born: 14 October 1890 Sydney, New South Wales, Australia
- Died: 20 September 1968 (aged 77) Waverley, Sydney

Playing information
- Position: Centre, Wing, Five-eighth
Club
Years	Team	Pld	T	G	FG	P
1911–12	Glebe	21	3	1	0	11
- Source: As of 11 February 2019
- Relatives: Les Cubitt (brother)

Charles Rupert Cubitt (14 October 1890 – 20 September 1968) was a pioneer Australian rugby league footballer who played in the 1910s.

== Playing career ==
Charlie Cubitt played with Glebe for two seasons between (1911–1912). Charlie Cubitt was the older brother of the rugby league footballer Les Cubitt.

Cubitt played in the 1911 NSWRL grand final against Eastern Suburbs which ended in a 11–8 loss despite Cubitt scoring 2 tries in the match. Cubitt played on in 1912 as Glebe finished as runners up in the competition to Easts yet again. Eastern Suburbs won the premiership by coming first and no grand final was contested to determine a winner.

Cubitt died on 20 September 1968, aged 77.
