= Roy Norman =

Australian rugby league footballer

Personal information
- Full name: Roy Joseph Patrick Norman
- Born: 15 March 1885 Petersham, New South Wales, Australia
- Died: 4 July 1967 (aged 82) Bondi, New South Wales

Playing information
- Position: Wing, Centre
Club
| Years | Team | Pld | T | G | FG | P |
|---|---|---|---|---|---|---|
| 1910–12 | Annandale | 33 | 16 | 3 | 0 | 54 |
| 1913–14 | Glebe | 20 | 12 | 0 | 0 | 36 |
| 1915 | Annandale | 1 | 0 | 0 | 0 | 0 |
| 1916 | Western Suburbs | 3 | 0 | 0 | 0 | 0 |
| | Total | 57 | 28 | 3 | 0 | 90 |
Representative
| Years | Team | Pld | T | G | FG | P |
| 1910 | New South Wales | 1 | 0 | 0 | 0 | 0 |
| 1911 | Metropolis | 1 | 1 | 0 | 0 | 3 |
- Relatives: Ray Norman (brother); Rex Norman (brother)

Roy Joseph Patrick Norman (1885-1967) was an Australian rugby league player who played in the 1910s.

== Playing career ==
Norman was one of four brothers who turned out for four Sydney based rugby league teams in the foundation years of the NSWRFL. The elder brother of Bernard, Ray and Rex, Norman played rugby league until he turned 31 in 1916. Norman also made one appearance for New South Wales team in 1910.

== Death ==
Norman died on 7 July 1967, aged 82.
