= Martin Kennedy (rugby league) =

Australian rugby league footballer

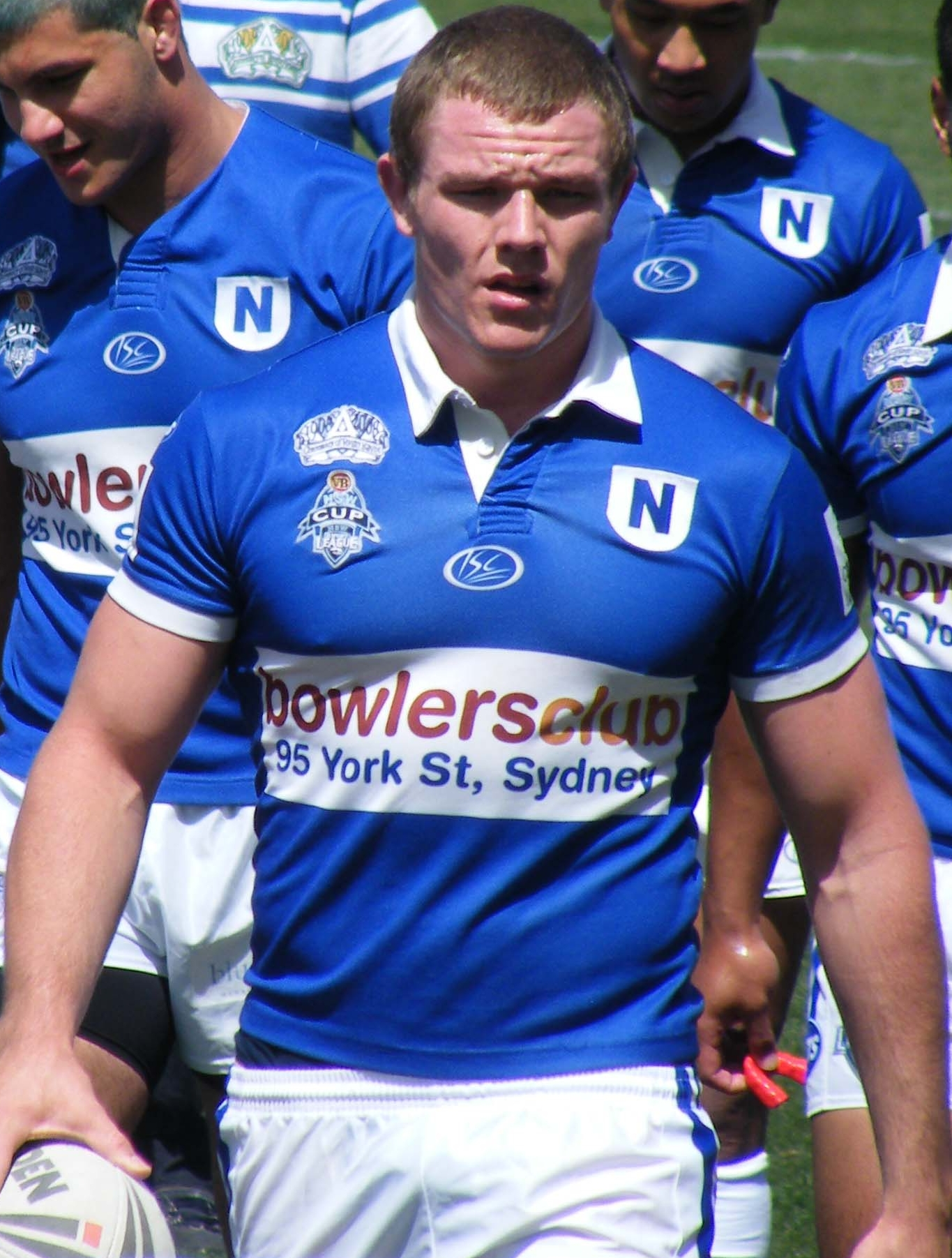

Personal information
- Born: 20 February 1989 (age 37) Lismore, New South Wales, Australia

Playing information
- Height: 190 cm (6 ft 3 in)
- Weight: 122 kg (19 st 3 lb)
- Position: Prop
Club
Years	Team	Pld	T	G	FG	P
2009–13	Sydney Roosters	66	4	0	0	16
2014	Brisbane Broncos	16	0	0	0	0
	Total	82	4	0	0	16
Representative
Years	Team	Pld	T	G	FG	P
2012	Prime Minister's XIII	1	0	0	0	0
- Source: RLP

Martin Kennedy (born 20 February 1989) is an Australian professional rugby league footballer who plays as a prop.

== Background ==
Kennedy was born in Lismore, New South Wales, Australia.

== Playing career ==
A junior for Norths Ipswich in Queensland, Kennedy was signed by the Sydney Roosters and made his National Rugby League debut in 2009. He played his 50th NRL match on 1 September 2012.

In July 2013 he signed a three-year, $1 million contract with the Brisbane Broncos starting in 2014.

On 29 October 2014, Kennedy was released from the last two years of his contract to explore other options. A day later on 30 October 2014, Kennedy announced on social media that he was returning to his former club the Sydney Roosters for the 2015 and 2016 seasons.

In March 2015, Kennedy was issued with an infraction notice for possession and use of banned testosterone-based substances. In January 2016, Kennedy was suspended for two years and nine months for breaching the National Rugby League's anti-doping policy for: attempted use of selective androgen receptor modulators (SARMS S22); attempted use of growth hormone; attempted use of chorionic gonadotrophin and attempted use of insulin.

== Representative career ==
Kennedy captained the 2007 Australian Schoolboys team, with future NRL players such as Daniel Mortimer, Kieran Foran, Jake Friend, Andrew McCullough and Kevin Proctor on an undefeated tour of New Zealand.

Kennedy's State of Origin eligibility was a big talking point after an impressive showing against the Wests Tigers in Round 4 of the 2011 season. After the match Kennedy stated that he "bleeds maroon" and declared himself eligible for Queensland This caused an uproar from NSWRL officials who believed Kennedy (who was born in Lismore, New South Wales) was not eligible for Queensland.

This was proven not to be the case as Kennedy had moved to Queensland as a 10-year-old and played all his junior footy at Norths Ipswich, represented Queensland Under 17's and attended Ipswich Grammar School before signing with the Roosters in 2006 and playing for Matraville High School for one year in 2007. Kennedy was also selected to be a part of the 2011 Emerging Queensland Origin Squad in late December 2010.

In 2013 Kennedy was picked as Queensland's 18th man in game two of the series.

== Personal life ==
Kennedy is currently the owner of Snake Ranch, one of the largest reptile breeding facilities in Australia.

In March 2017, Kennedy was arrested over involvement in an international wildlife smuggling ring. The Australian Federal Police found large amounts of cash and a number of reptiles at his home in Bondi. He was issued with fresh charges relating to his involvement in the cruel wildlife smuggling syndicate and appeared before a committal hearing in September.

In 2018, Kennedy pleaded guilty to six offences including attempting to export shingleback lizards to Sweden, importing alligator snapping turtles and neotropical stingrays from Thailand, and illegally possessing two pythons at his Sydney home. In October 2019 Kennedy was jailed for four years for wildlife smuggling after an appeal court ruled a good-behaviour bond wasn't a tough enough penalty.
