= Rex Norman =

Australian rugby league footballer and cricketer

Personal information
- Full name: Hercules Rex Clive Norman
- Born: 8 August 1891 Sydney, New South Wales, Australia
- Died: 30 December 1961 (aged 70) Guildford, New South Wales, Australia

Playing information
- Position: Centre, Wing, Fullback
Club
Years	Team	Pld	T	G	FG	P
1910–14	Annandale	56	9	0	0	27
1915–17	South Sydney	33	12	0	0	36
1918	Eastern Suburbs	12	1	0	0	3
1919	South Sydney	7	0	0	0	0
1920–22	Eastern Suburbs	34	7	45	0	111
	Total	142	29	45	0	177
Representative
Years	Team	Pld	T	G	FG	P
1921	New South Wales	1	1	4	0	11
1911–15	Metropolis	3	1	0	0	3
- Source: As of 21 June 2019
- Relatives: Ray Norman (brother); Roy Norman (brother)

Rex Norman (1891–1961) was an Australian rugby league footballer and cricketer, who represented Australasia in rugby league and New South Wales in both sports.

== Rugby league career ==
Norman played 13 seasons in first grade in the NSWRFL, playing for Annandale between 1910 and 1914, South Sydney between 1915-1917 and 1919, and Eastern Suburbs Roosters in 1918, and 1920–1922. He was one of four brothers along, with Bernard, Roy and Ray, who played in the NSW Rugby Football League first-grade competition. Rex and Ray became only the second set of brothers to represent Australia, behind Viv and Bill Farnsworth. Rex was selected for Australasia for the 1921–22 Kangaroo tour of Great Britain. He played in 21 tour matches but did not play a test match.

Norman was the NSW Rugby Football League's top point scorer in 1921.

== Cricket career ==
Norman also played first-class cricket for New South Wales, appearing in seven matches from 1918 to 1920. A left-arm fast-medium bowler, he took 31 wickets at 26.83.

== Later years ==
Norman finished his long career in Canowindra, New South Wales, captain-coaching both the local rugby league team and cricket team. Whilst playing cricket against a touring professional side, Norman bowled a young Don Bradman for a "duck". His nickname in the small country town was "Rocker".

In 1953 Norman coached the NSW Country Rugby League Firsts side to a 28-27 victory over City Firsts.
