= Les Cubitt =

Australia international rugby league footballer

Personal information
- Full name: Leslie Clyde Cubitt
- Born: 31 October 1892 Sydney, New South Wales, Australia
- Died: 10 November 1968 (aged 76) Katoomba, New South Wales, Australia

Playing information
- Height: 178 cm (5 ft 10 in)
- Weight: 79 kg (12 st 6 lb)
- Position: Centre, Five-eighth
Club
Years	Team	Pld	T	G	FG	P
1911	Glebe	16	9	5	0	37
1913–22	Eastern Suburbs	93	53	8	0	165
	Total	109	62	13	0	202
Representative
Years	Team	Pld	T	G	FG	P
1911–19	New South Wales	14	24	3	0	78
1919–22	Australia	4	5	0	0	15
1912–14	Metropolis	3	3	0	0	9
- Relatives: Charlie Cubitt (brother)

Les Cubitt (31 October 1892 – 10 November 1968) was an Australian representative rugby league player, a centre, or five-eighth whose club career was with Eastern Suburbs and the Glebe. He is considered one of the nation's finest footballers of the 20th century.

== Club career ==
Cubitt commenced his club career at just eighteen years of age with Glebe playing alongside his older brother Charlie Cubitt in the 1911 Grand Final loss to Eastern Suburbs. In 1913, Cubitt joined Eastern Suburbs where he played for the next nine seasons winning a premiership in 1913. Cubitt was the younger brother of the rugby league footballer; Charlie Cubitt.

During the beginning of his career, Cubitt was better known for his goal-kicking skills, however, he transitioned into more of a try-scorer later in his career. He was an adept side-stepper and was also very proficient at selling fake passes to opposing defenders.

== Representative career ==
He was first selected for New South Wales in 1911 but had to wait until the end of the First World War to make his national representative debut. He played in the centres in all four Tests of Australia's first tour of New Zealand in 1919 scoring four tries in the tests and 17 tries in the last three tour matches. He is listed on the Australian Players Register as Kangaroo No. 95.

He was selected as captain of the 1921-22 "Australasian" Kangaroos which had two New Zealanders in the squad. He concealed a serious knee injury which he aggravated on the tour in England and which led to his eventual retirement in 1922.

== Accolades ==
In February 2008, Cubitt was named in the list of Australia's 100 Greatest Players (1908–2007) which was commissioned by the NRL and ARL to celebrate the code's centenary year in Australia.

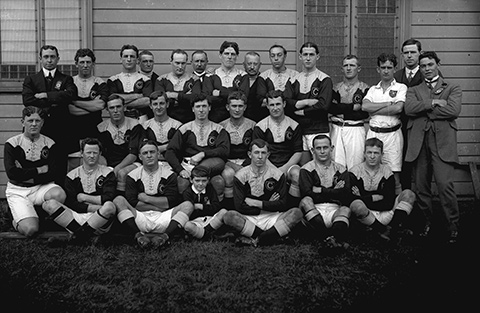
Glebe RLC 1911

Cubitt seated right in hat with the 1921-22 Kangaroos

== Sources ==
- Whiticker, Alan & Hudson, Glen (2006) The Encyclopedia of Rugby League Players, Gavin Allen Publishing, Sydney
