= Charlie Lees =

Australian rugby league footballer

Personal information
- Full name: Charles Lees
- Born: 24 September 1887 Woollahra, New South Wales
- Died: 26 June 1976 (aged 88) Rose Bay, New South Wales

Playing information
- Position: Second-row, Prop, Lock
Club
Years	Team	Pld	T	G	FG	P
1911–21	Eastern Suburbs	152	14	2	0	101
Representative
Years	Team	Pld	T	G	FG	P
1913	New South Wales	4	0	0	0	0
1914	Metropolis	2	0	0	0	0

Charlie Lees (1887-1976) was a rugby league player in the Australian competition - the NSWRFL.

== Playing career ==
Lees played for the Eastern Suburbs club in the years (1911 to 1921). A forward, Lees was a member of Eastern Suburbs' first premiership winning sides in 1911 (in which he scored his side's only try), 1912 and 1913, and won City Cups with the club in 1914, 1915 and 1916.

Described as a solid defensive player, Lees was one of the earliest members to play 100 matches for the Eastern Suburbs club, playing 152 in total. Lees was Eastern Suburbs' sole try scorer in the match that brought the club its first premiership.

Lees was chosen to play for NSW in 1913. He was awarded Life Membership of the New South Wales Rugby League in 1931.

Lees was awarded Life Member status for the Sydney Roosters in 1950
