= Ray Norman =

Australia international rugby league footballer and coach

Personal information
- Full name: Hugh Valentine Raymond Norman
- Born: 30 November 1888; Leichhardt, New South Wales, Australia
- Died: 29 April 1971 (aged 82); Kogarah, New South Wales, Australia

Playing information
- Position: Five-eighth
Club
Years	Team	Pld	T	G	FG	P
1910–13	Annandale	46	12	26	0	88
1914–16	South Sydney	38	5	1	0	17
1917–21	Eastern Suburbs	51	3	30	0	39
	Total	135	20	57	0	144
Representative
Years	Team	Pld	T	G	FG	P
1912–20	New South Wales	22	8	22	0	68
1914–19	Australia	4	1	0	0	3
1912–20	Metropolis	3	5	1	0	17

Coaching information
Club
Years	Team	Gms	W	D	L	W%
1923	Eastern Suburbs	17	14	0	3	82
1954	Manly-Warringah	18	10	1	7	56
	Total	35	24	1	10	69
Representative
Years	Team	Gms	W	D	L	W%
	NSW Country
- Source: As of 30 June 2009
- Relatives: Roy Norman (brother); Rex Norman (brother)

Ray Norman (1889–1971) was an Australian rugby league footballer and coach. A New South Wales state and Australia national representative, his club career was played with Annandale, the South Sydney and the Eastern Suburbs clubs in the NSWRFL.

== Playing career ==
After playing rugby union for Annadale and Glebe, Norman switched to rugby league in 1910 featuring in their inaugural season.

He was one of four brothers, along with Bernard, Roy and Rex Norman, who played in the NSW Rugby Football League first-grade competition. Both Rex and Ray represented the Australia national rugby league team, becoming only the second set of brothers to do so behind Viv and Bill Farnsworth. In 1914, Norman played 12 games as South Sydney won the premiership that season by virtue of the first past the post rule.

Norman was first selected for Australia in 1914 and after the war he toured New Zealand in 1919. He retired from playing in 1921, and immediately joined the coaching ranks at Eastern Suburbs.

== Coaching career ==
After retiring as a player, Norman coached the Eastern Suburbs which included a premiership in 1923. He later coached the Manly-Warringah Sea Eagles for one year, in 1954, and the NSW Country representative side.

== Death ==
The Sydney Morning Herald said of Norman: "He was one of Rugby League's greatest tacticians". His funeral was held at St Peter's Church, Watsons Bay on 3 May 1971 and later at Northern Suburbs Crematorium.

Sporting positions
Preceded by Roy Bull; 1953	Coach Manly-Warringah; 1954	Succeeded by Pat Devery; 1955-1956
