= Harry Caples =

Australian rugby league footballer

Personal information
- Full name: Henry Joseph Caples
- Born: 1898 Bathurst, New South Wales
- Died: 17 October 1933 (aged 34–35) St Vincent's Hospital, Sydney

Playing information
- Position: Five-eighth
Club
Years	Team	Pld	T	G	FG	P
1916–23	Eastern Suburbs	103	28	0	0	84
1925–27	Brothers (Ipswich)
1929	Eastern Suburbs	3	0	0	0	0
	Total	106	28	0	0	84
Representative
Years	Team	Pld	T	G	FG	P
1919–23	New South Wales	4	1	0	0	3
1921–22	Australia	2	0	0	0	0
1925–27	Queensland	9	5	0	0	15

Harry Caples (1898–1933) was an Australian representative rugby league player. His club football was played with the Eastern Suburbs club.

== Club career ==
A former schoolboy star, Caples attended St. Joseph's College, Hunters Hill before being graded by the Roosters in 1916.

He played 110 matches for the club in the years (1916-23 & 1929). A five-eighth, Caples captained Easts to the club's fourth premiership in 1923, scoring two tries in that match.

== Representative career ==
Caples was selected for the 1921–22 Kangaroo tour of Great Britain. He played for Australia in two Tests on tour and 22 minor tour matches. He is listed on the Australian Players Register as Kangaroo No. 117. During his career he represented for three different states New South Wales, Queensland and Victoria.

== Interstate service to the game ==
After his premiership success in 1923, Harry Caples moved to Victoria in 1924 at the direction of ARL executive Harry Sunderland to help organise Rugby League in the southern states. Sydney's Evening News newspaper quoted: "Mr Sunderland is making strong efforts to place the game on a solid footing in Melbourne, and he has approached several noted players to go south and give their services."

Sunderland (who was Queensland based), then sent him to Ipswich, Queensland in 1925 and he played there for a number of years. Caples captain-coached Wagga Wagga in 1928, before returning to Easts for one last season in 1929.

== Premature death ==
Caples died after contracting Meningitis at the relatively young age of 35. A large funeral was held for him at the Sacred Heart Church, Randwick and he was buried at Randwick Cemetery. He was survived by his wife Dorothy and three young children.

== Sources ==
- Whiticker, Alan & Collis, Ian (2006) The History of Rugby League Clubs, New Holland, Sydney
- Andrews, Malcolm (2006) The ABC of Rugby League Austn Broadcasting Corpn, Sydney
- Queensland representatives at qrl.com.au
