= Gordon Wright (rugby league) =

Australian rugby league footballer

Personal information
- Full name: Gordon Wright

Playing information
- Position: Five-eighth, Wing
Club
| Years | Team | Pld | T | G | FG | P |
|---|---|---|---|---|---|---|
| 1917–23 | Eastern Suburbs | 65 | 64 | 0 | 0 | 192 |
Representative
| Years | Team | Pld | T | G | FG | P |
| 1919–22 | Metropolis | 3 | 8 | 1 | 0 | 26 |
- Source: As of 21 June 2019

Gordon Wright was an Australian rugby league footballer who played in the early 20th century. He played in the New South Wales Rugby Football League premiership for the Eastern Suburbs club.

Wright was a wing who played for the Eastern Suburbs club for seven seasons in the years (1917–23).

== Try scoring record ==
He was the NSWRL's leading try scorer for three consecutive seasons, in 1919, 1920 and 1921. This feat has been accomplished only twice since by Benny Wearing and Nathan Blacklock.

In a match against Balmain in 1920, he scored 5 tries.

He played 66 matches during his career for a total of 65 tries and is recognised as the 96th player to represent the Eastern Suburbs club. In all competitions including the City Cup, Wright scored a total of 84 tries in 80 games.
