= Thomas James (disambiguation) =

Thomas James (c. 1573–1629) was an English librarian and Anglican clergyman.

Thomas, Tommy or Tom James may also refer to

== Sports ==
- Tom James (rower) (born 1984), British rower
- Tom James (rugby union, born 1987), Welsh rugby union footballer
- Tom James (rugby union, born 1993), English rugby union footballer
- Tom James (English footballer) (born 1988), English footballer
- Tom James (Welsh footballer) (born 1996), Welsh footballer
- Tommy James (American football) (1923–2007), American football cornerback
- Tommy James (rugby league), Australian rugby league footballer
- Tommy James (rugby union), Welsh international rugby union player

== Politicians ==
- Thomas James (died 1619), English politician
- Thomas E. James (1872–1936), American politician, mayor of Miami Beach, Florida
- General Thomas James (1782–1847), trapper who served in the Illinois Legislature, was a general in the Illinois Militia, and served in the Black Hawk War
- Tom James (Texas politician) (born 1929), American politician in the Texas House of Representatives
- Tom James (Wyoming politician), member of the Wyoming Senate

== Others ==
- Thomas Lemuel James (1831–1916), banker and journalist who served as U.S. Postmaster General in 1881
- Thomas James (sea captain) (1593–1635), Arctic explorer
- Thomas James (minister, born 1595) (1595–1683), English Puritan minister in Massachusetts, Providence, New Haven, and Virginia
- Thomas James (minister, born 1620) (1620–1698), Puritan minister of East Hampton, Long Island
- Thomas James (minister, born 1804) (1804–1891), former slave who wrote a short memoir
- Thomas James (soldier) (c. 1789–c. 1827), British soldier
- Thomas James (businessman) (born 1940s), American businessman, chairman of Raymond James
- Thomas Marriott James (1875–1942), American architect
- Thomas Naum James (1925–2010), American cardiologist
- Tom James (professor) (born 1971), British professor and author
- Tommy James (born 1947), musician
- T. G. H. James (1923–2009), British Egyptologist
- Thomas James (bishop) (1786–1828), Anglican bishop in India
- Thomas Shadrach James (1859–1946), school teacher, Methodist lay preacher, linguist and herbalist
- Tommy Lee James, American country music songwriter and record producer
- Thomas Potts James (1803–1882), American botanist and bryologist
- Thomas S. James Jr., United States Army general
- Thomas L. James, United States Army general
- T. P. James (Thomas Power James), publisher
- Individualized Apparel Group, originally Tom James Company, American clothing company
- Manikuttan, stage name of Indian actor Thomas James (born 1986)
