= Mick Muggivan =

Australian rugby league footballer

Personal information
- Full name: Michael Muggivan
- Born: 22 July 1887; Paddington, New South Wales, Australia
- Died: 6 April 1971 (aged 83); Brisbane, Queensland, Australia

Playing information
- Position: Centre, Five-eighth, Wing
Club
Years	Team	Pld	T	G	FG	P
1910–12	Glebe	21	13	0	0	39
Representative
Years	Team	Pld	T	G	FG	P
1911	Metropolis	2	1	1	0	5
- Source: As of 11 February 2019

Michael Muggivan (1887–1971) was an Australian professional rugby league footballer who played in 1910s.

== Playing career ==
Muggivan played for Glebe for three seasons between 1910 and 1912.

He made one representative appearance for Metropolis (Sydney) in 1911. Sydney Beat Country 29–8 and Mick Muggivan scored an excellent try in the match played on 10 June 1911.

Muggivan played with other notable players in the Sydney Team such as Frank Burge, Mick Frawley and Ray Norman. Muggivan moved to Brisbane, Queensland in the 1930s and died there in 1971.
