= Jack Toohey (rugby league) =

Australian rugby league footballer

Personal information
- Full name: John Joseph Toohey
- Born: 13 June 1899 Glebe, New South Wales, Australia
- Died: 19 June 1968 (aged 69) South Hurstville, New South Wales, Australia

Playing information
- Position: Wing, Centre
Club
| Years | Team | Pld | T | G | FG | P |
|---|---|---|---|---|---|---|
| 1917–28 | Glebe | 69 | 31 | 42 | 0 | 177 |
Representative
| Years | Team | Pld | T | G | FG | P |
| 1922–26 | New South Wales | 10 | 12 | 6 | 0 | 48 |
- Source: As of 8 February 2019

John Joseph Toohey (1899–1968) was an Australian rugby league footballer who played in the 1910s and 1920s for Glebe in the NSWRL competition.

== Background ==
Toohey was born in Glebe, New South Wales to parents Patrick and Bridget Ann Toohey, Toohey came through the juniors to make grade for Glebe Dirty Reds in 1917.

== Playing career ==
He was a long serving player with the Reds playing nine seasons with the club between 1917 and 1928. Toohey did not feature in Glebe's grand final appearance in 1926 due to injury, although he did captain the club on many occasions. Toohey was a contemporary of the great Frank Burge and other great Glebe players from that era.

Toohey was also a representative player, playing for New South Wales on three occasions between 1922 and 1926.

Toohey died on 19 June 1968, aged 69 at South Hurstville, New South Wales.
