= Harold Angus =

Australian rugby league footballer (1892-1979)

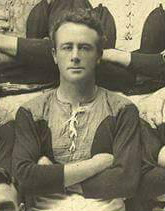

Personal information
- Full name: Harold James Angus
- Born: 21 September 1892; Sydney
- Died: 17 August 1979 (aged 86); Yowie Bay, New South Wales

Playing information
- Position: Lock, Second-row
Club
Years	Team	Pld	T	G	FG	P
1916–20	Glebe	18	0	0	0	0

Harold James Angus (1892–1979) was an Australian rugby league footballer for the Glebe club in the early years of the NSWRFL competition.

== Playing career ==
A local junior, Angus was a tough forward who played for the Glebe Dirty Red's for many years and captained Glebe Reserve Grade sides to premiership victory in 1918 and 1919. He retired in the early 1920s.

Angus was often used as a first grade replacement player for Club Captain Frank Burge.

== Death ==
Angus died in the Sutherland Shire on 17 August 1979 and was interred at Rookwood Cemetery on 20 August 1979.

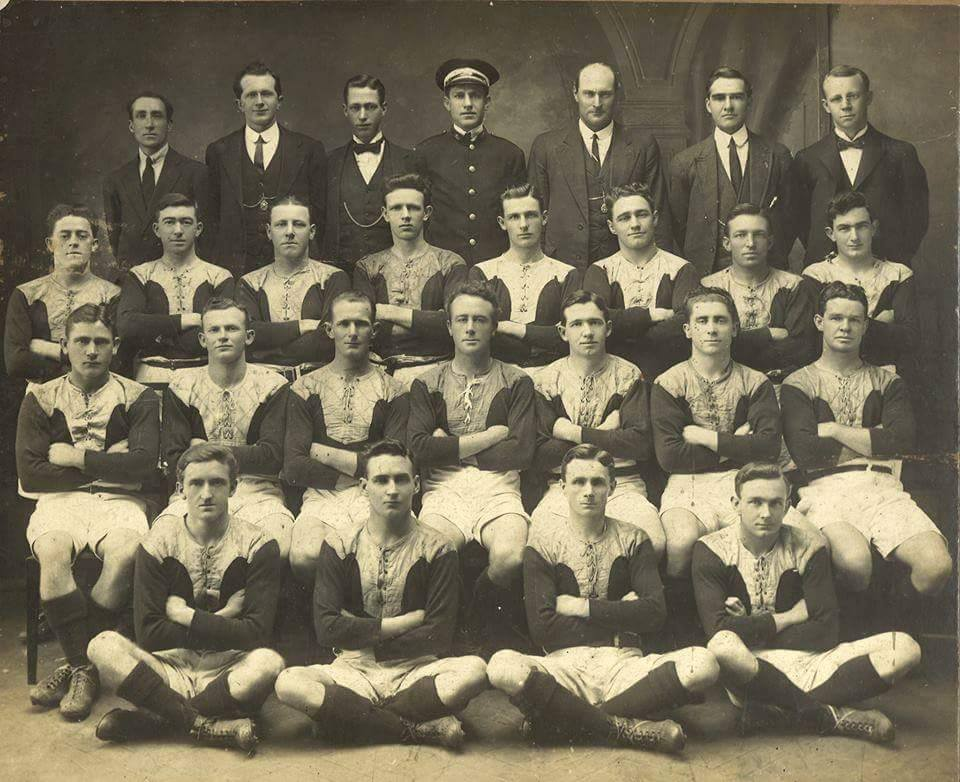
Harold Angus, captain of Glebe Reserve Grade, 1920
