= Max Doerner =

Max Doerner may refer to:

- Max Doerner (rugby league) (1889–1967), Australian rugby league player
- Max Doerner (artist) (1870–1939), German artist and art theorist
