= Hash Thompson =

Australian rugby league footballer

Playing information
- Position: Centre, Wing, Second-row
Club
| Years | Team | Pld | T | G | FG | P |
|---|---|---|---|---|---|---|
| 1908 | Eastern Suburbs | 5 | 1 | 0 | 0 | 3 |
| 1909–16 | South Sydney | 54 | 18 | 1 | 0 | 56 |
| 1919–20 | Glebe | 2 | 1 | 0 | 0 | 3 |
| | Total | 61 | 20 | 1 | 0 | 62 |
Representative
| Years | Team | Pld | T | G | FG | P |
| 1908-15 | Metropolis | 4 | 2 | 0 | 0 | 6 |
| 1908 | Australia Possibles | 1 | 0 | 0 | 0 | 0 |
| 1909-15 | New South Wales | 10 | 8 | 0 | 0 | 24 |

Hash Thompson was an Australian professional rugby league footballer who played in the 1900s, 1910s and 1920s. He played ten seasons in the New South Wales Rugby League Premiership, spending most of his career with South Sydney.

== Club career ==
Thompson made his rugby league debut with Eastern Suburbs on 16 May, 1908. He started on the lock in round 3 against Souths, with his side winning 13-12. In round 7, he scored his debut try in a 26-5 win against the lowly Cumberland Fruit Pickers. He made 5 season appearances with Easts, before signing with Souths at the season's end. Easts (who tied first on the ladder with Souths) played in the finals and lost to Souths, however Thompson did not play.

Thompson made his debut with Souths in Round 1, 1909 against Balmain, however he only made one more appearance for the season, before sitting out the 1910 season. In 1911, he returned in round 5 against the Western Suburbs, this time on the wing. Thompson made his second and final appearance for the season, playing in South Sydney's 10-23 loss to Easts in the elimination final.

In 1912, Thompson scored against Newtown in round 9, marking his first try with Souths. He played five more games until the season's end, finishing the season with a try from 12 games.

In round 8, 1913 against Western Suburbs, he scored his first and only goal of his career. Thompson had a good game in Souths' 31-7 win over Annadale, scoring 2 tries. Two rounds later, Thompson was reverted from centre to wing, scoring 2 tries against Newtown. His transition to wing proved effective, as he scored 2 more tries in the two remaining games of the season at that position. He had a very successful 1913 season, scoring 8 tries and a goal (26 points) in 13 appearances.

He scored 3 tries in 11 appearances for the 1914 season, helping Souths win their 3rd club premiership (which was determined by highest win total for the season) and their first since 1909.

Thompson had a short, but effective 1915 season. He set the ground running with a 2-try performance in a big win over Wests (30-3 in Round 4), before scoring twice in a draw against Balmain in round 7. He finished the season with 6 tries from 9 appearances. Despite Thompson's performances, Souths finished 4th for the season.

1916 saw Thompson play his only game of the season, and last game of his career with Souths, in a 3-5 loss to Balmain.

Thompson did not play another NSWRL game until the 1919 season, which he returned after signing with Glebe, however he only played two games with them over two seasons. He made his first appearance since 1916, and only appearance for the season in June, losing 15-5 to Balmain. He also only played one game in his final season in 1920. Thompson played his final career game in round 1 in a huge 43-0 win over Annadale (who finished the season 0-13), and holds the distinction of scoring a try in his final game.

He concluded his 10-year career with 20 tries and 1 goal (62 points) in 57 games.

== Representative career ==
Thompson was a standout for New South Wales Firsts, scoring 8 tries in 10 appearances, including a hat-trick during their 1913 Tour. NSW were a strong representative team at the time, with Thompson's team winning every game he played in. On average, NSW were scoring almost 37 points per game, scoring 332 points, while conceding only 58 in just 9 games.

During his representative career, Thompson represented Metropolis and also played a match for the Australian Possibles.
