= Bill Benson (rugby league) =

Australian rugby league footballer

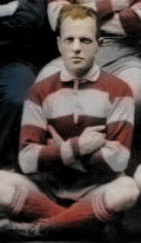
- Bill Benson. 1927

Personal information
- Full name: William Henry Benson
- Born: 4 January 1893; Sydney, New South Wales, Australia
- Died: 25 May 1968 (aged 75); Sydney, New South Wales, Australia

Playing information
- Position: Halfback
Club
Years	Team	Pld	T	G	FG	P
1916–24	Glebe	110	23	1	0	71
1927	St George	16	0	0	0	0
	Total	126	23	1	0	71
Representative
Years	Team	Pld	T	G	FG	P
1921–24	New South Wales	11	0	0	0	0

William Henry Benson (1893–1968) was an Australian rugby league footballer who played in the 1910s and 1920s.

== Career ==
Bill "Binghi" Benson was a pioneer halfback in the early years of the NSWRFL. He played halfback for the Glebe Dirty Reds for ten seasons between 1916 and 1924. Benson played in the 1922 NSWRL grand final for Glebe against North Sydney which ended in a 35–3 loss at the Sydney Cricket Ground.

Benson then switched to St. George for his final season with his Glebe team-mate Frank Burge, and the two of them took St George to the 1927 Final after the club got the wooden spoon the year before. He represented New South Wales on five occasions between 1921 and 1924, but was never selected to play for Australia.

== Death ==
A resident of Forest Lodge, New South Wales for his entire life, Benson died after watching a world cup match between Australia and England at the Sydney Cricket Ground on 25 May 1968. He was aged 75. His funeral was held two days later and he was cremated at Woronora Crematorium, Sutherland, New South Wales
