= Harry Melville (rugby league) =

Australian rugby league footballer

Personal information
- Full name: Harry Melville
- Born: 13 October 1929 Kogarah, New South Wales, Australia
- Died: 6 January 1965 (aged 35) Kogarah, New South Wales, Australia

Playing information
- Position: Second-row
Club
Years	Team	Pld	T	G	FG	P
1949-52, 1955–57	St. George	87	19	0	0	57
- Source: Whiticker/Hudson
- Father: Bill Melville

Harry 'Hughie' Melville (1929–1965) was an Australian rugby league footballer who played in the 1940s and 1950s and was a two time premiership winning player with St. George.

== Playing career ==
A local junior and the son of the former Glebe forward Bill Melville, Melville played for St. George for seven seasons between 1949 and 1952 and between 1955 and 1957. He was a two time premiership winning player with the Dragons. He was also a member of the playing squad in 1949 Grand Final and played in the 1956 Grand Final, scoring a try in that match, and was a member of the squad for the 1957 Grand Final. He played 137 games for St. George Dragons in all grades during his career.

Melville's place in the team was taken at the signing of champion forward, Harry Bath, and he retired from St. George soon afterward.

He died at the relatively young age of 35 on 6 January 1965.
