= Bill Melville =

Australian rugby league footballer

Personal information
- Full name: William Elvy Melville
- Born: 10 January 1902 Redfern, New South Wales, Australia
- Died: 15 January 1981 (aged 79) Mascot, New South Wales, Australia

Playing information
- Position: Second-row
Club
Years	Team	Pld	T	G	FG	P
1926–27	Glebe	17	4	0	0	12
- Source: Whittaker/Hudson
- Relatives: Harry Melville (son)

William Elvy Melville (1902–1981) was an Australian rugby league footballer from the 1920s.

Bill Melville was graded at Glebe from the Darlington junior rugby league club in 1926. He played two first grade seasons with Glebe before retiring, playing in the forward pack with the great Frank Burge.

Bill Melville was the father of the premiership winning St. George forward Harry Meville from the 1950s. He was also a member of the AIF during World War II.

Bill Melville died at Mascot, New South Wales on 15 Jan 1981 age 79.
