= Charles Ogle =

Charles Ogle may refer to:

- Charles Ogle (politician) (1798–1841), US congressman
- Sir Charles Ogle, 2nd Baronet (1775–1858), British admiral
  - Sir Charles Ogle, Canadian ferry
- Charles Stanton Ogle (1865–1940), American silent film actor
- Charles Chaloner Ogle (1851–1871), British journalist
- Charles Clifford Ogle (1923–1964), American businessman and aviator
- Charles Ogle (racing driver) (1941–1985), American physician, businessman and NASCAR driver
- Charlie Ogle (1893–1959), Australian rugby league player
