= Fritz Thiering =

Australian rugby league footballer

Personal information
- Full name: Fritz Thiering
- Born: 23 March 1891; Balmain, New South Wales, Australia
- Died: 3 February 1960 (aged 68); Kingsford, New South Wales, Australia

Playing information
- Position: Five-eighth, Halfback, Centre
Club
Years	Team	Pld	T	G	FG	P
1911–20	Glebe	29	7	18	0	57
- Source: As of 11 February 2019

Fritz Thiering (1892–1960) was an Australian rugby league footballer who played in the 1910s and 1920s.

== Playing career ==
Of German descent, Fritz debuted for the Glebe rugby league club in 1911 at the age of 21.

He played for Glebe for four seasons between 1911-1914 and returned for the 1920 season before retiring. He scored 7 tries and 18 goals during his career.

He played halfback in the Glebe team that were defeated in the 1911 Final.

Thiering was also a very successful middle-weight boxer in Sydney during his playing career.

Thiering died on 3 February 1960, at Kingsford, New South Wales.
