= 1919 NSWRFL season =

Rugby league competition

1919 New South Wales Rugby Football League
- Teams: 8
- Premiers: Balmain (4th title)
- Minor premiers: Balmain (4th title)
- Matches played: 56
- Points scored: 1474
- Top points scorer: Alexander McPherson (89)
- Wooden spoon: North Sydney (3rd spoon)
- Top try-scorer: Gordon Wright (17)

The 1919 New South Wales Rugby Football League premiership was the twelfth season of Sydney’s professional rugby league club competition, Australia’s first. Eight teams from across the city contested during the season, with Balmain finishing on top of the ladder to claim the premiership.

== Season summary ==
Balmain and Eastern Suburbs dominated the 14-round season, dropping just two and three games respectively. Balmain were undefeated after eight rounds but a mid-year Australian tour to New Zealand saw the black and golds lose their representative stars and their lead was lost to Eastern Suburbs for one week late in the season.

With eleven rounds played, Balmain led Eastern Suburbs by one point on the ladder but relinquished this lead by losing their round 12 match against Glebe as Eastern Suburbs beat winless Annandale 28–0. This meant Eastern Suburbs now led by one point with two rounds to play. However, they lost the very next round 15–12 to South Sydney, who had won just four of their twelve previous matches. Meanwhile, Balmain managed to beat Newtown 18–5, giving them the one point advantage heading into the final round.

The final match of the season turned out to be the decider for the premiership, with the top two teams playing one another at the Royal Agricultural Society Ground. The winner of the match would take out the premiership, whilst a draw would give Balmain the title. Ultimately, it was the goal kicking of Balmain's Lyall Wall that secured the premiership, with a 13–4 win over Eastern Suburbs. Five of Wall’s attempts hit the post that day, but four crossed the bar and won Balmain the title. Members of the Balmain premiership winning side included Bob Craig and Bill Kelly.

The City Cup was won by Wests for the second consecutive season.

=== Teams ===
The teams remained unchanged from the 1918 season

- Annandale
- Balmain, formed on January 23, 1908, at Balmain Town Hall
- Eastern Suburbs, formed on January 24, 1908, at Paddington Town Hall
- Glebe, formed on January 9, 1908
- Newtown, formed on January 14, 1908
- North Sydney, formed on February 7, 1908
- South Sydney, formed on January 17, 1908, at Redfern Town Hall
- Western Suburbs, formed on February 4, 1908

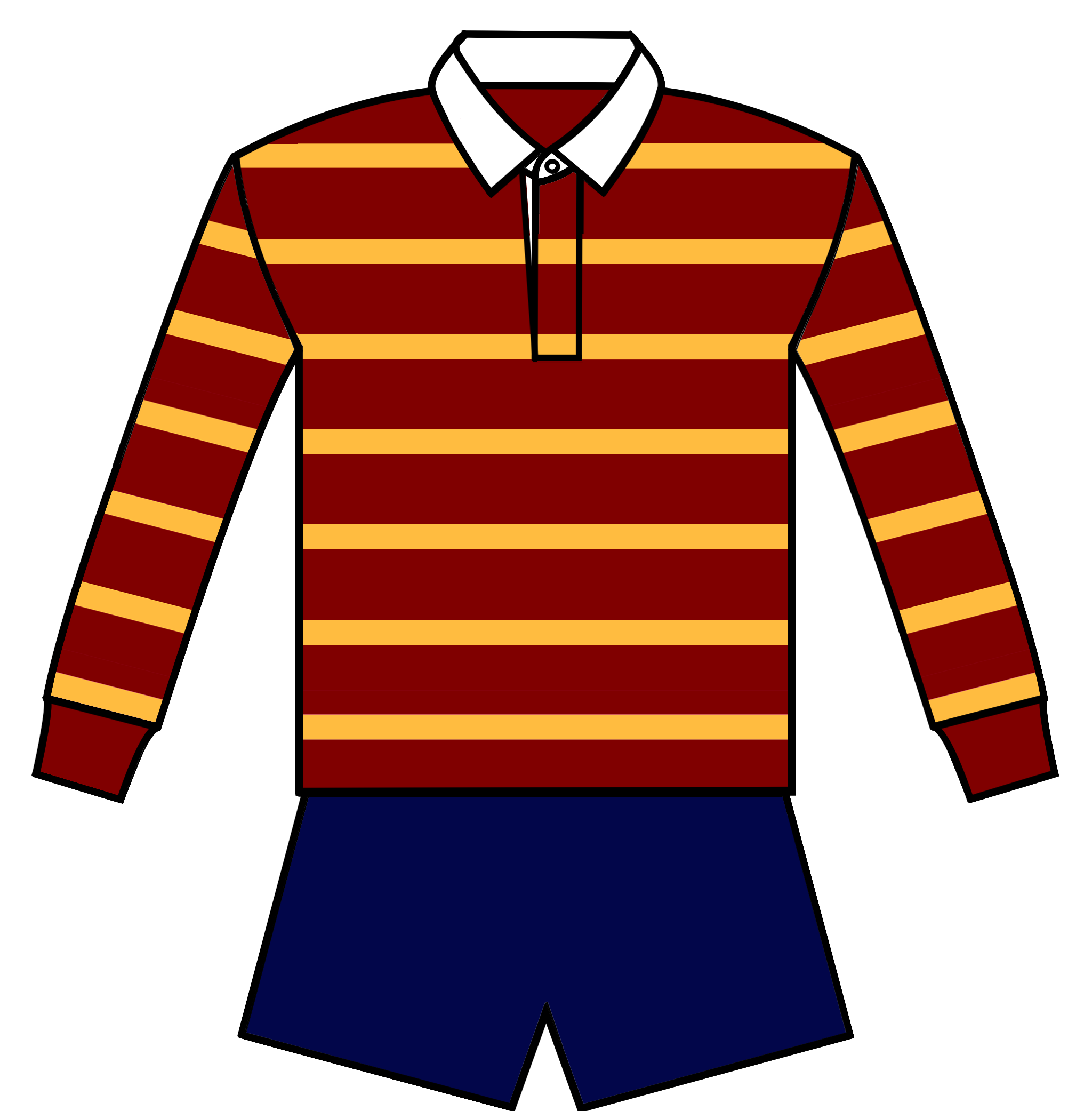
Annandale; 10th season Ground: Wentworth Park; Coach: Captain: Walter Haddock

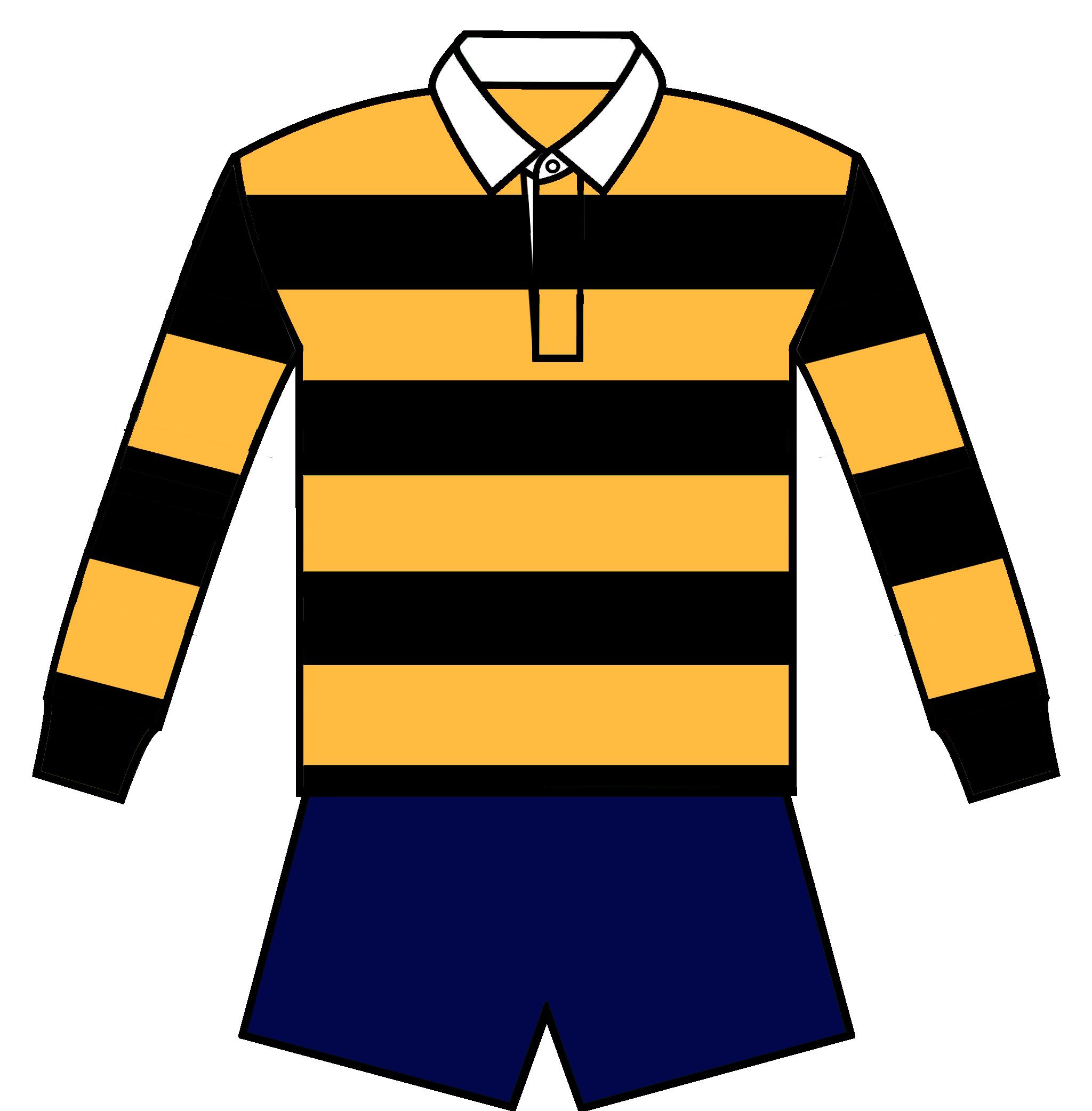
Balmain; 12th season Ground: Birchgrove Oval; Coach: Captain: Bob Craig

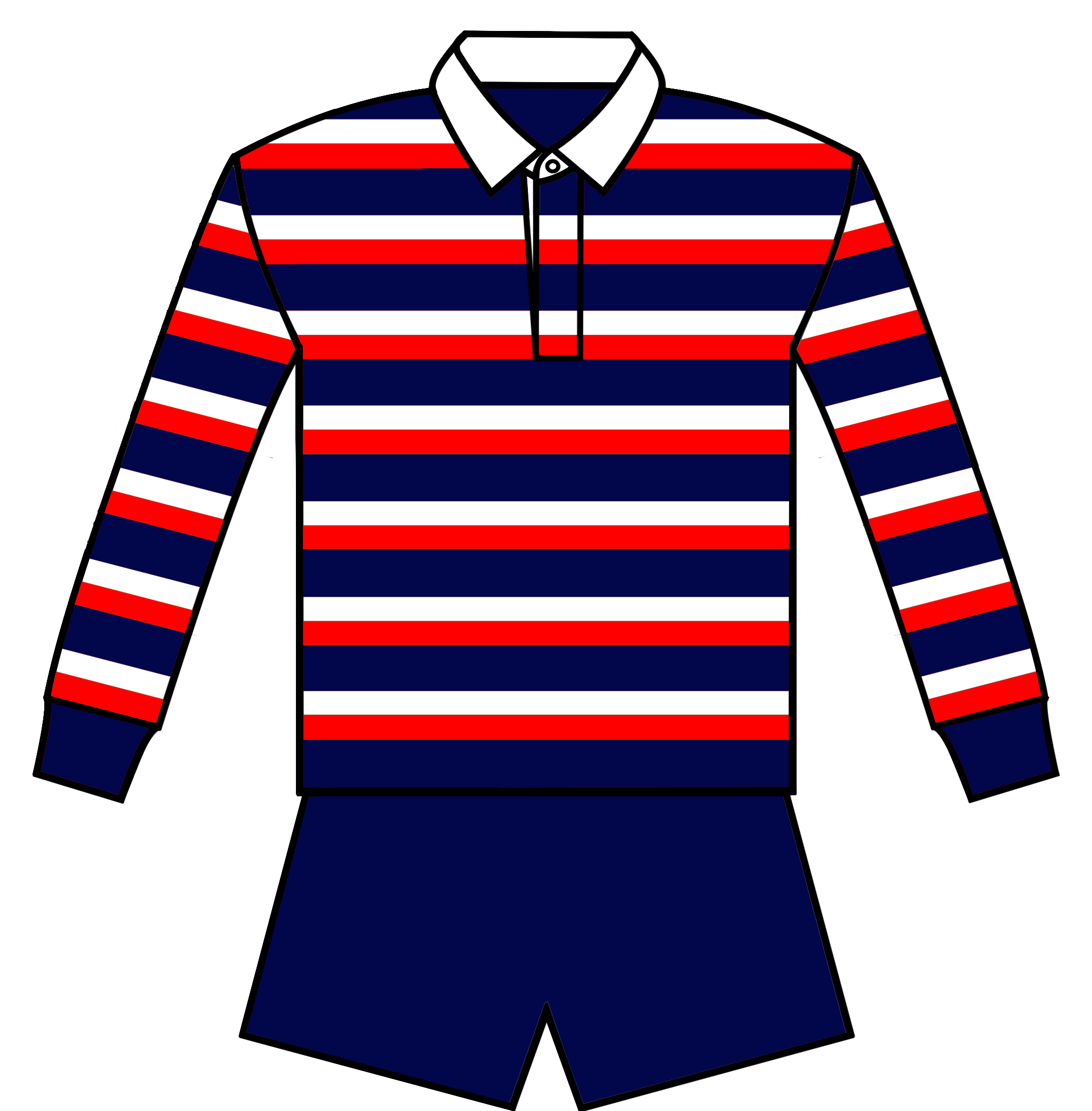
Eastern Suburbs; 12th season Ground: Sydney Sports Ground; Coach: Captain: Ray Norman

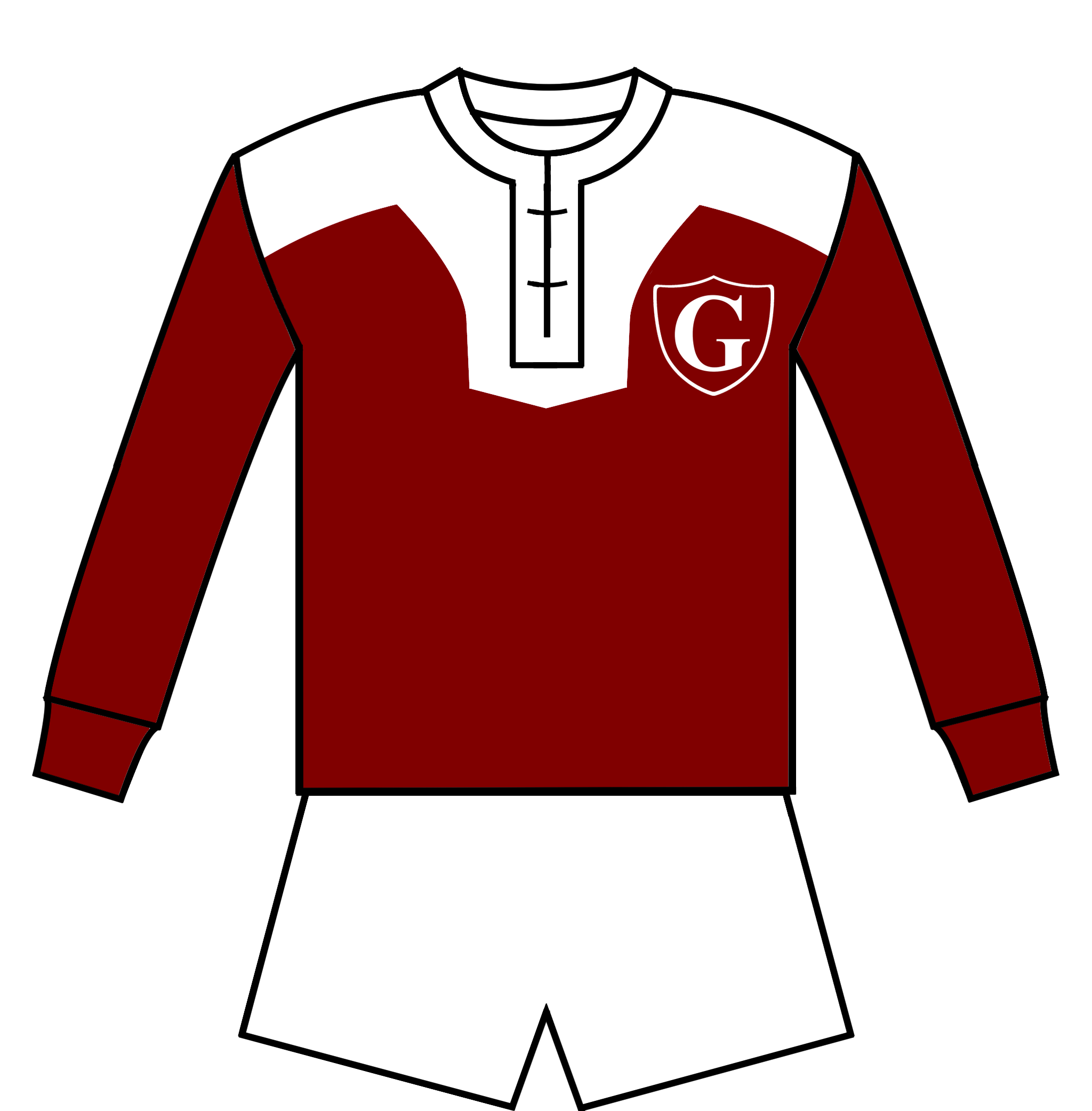
Glebe; 12th season Ground: Wentworth Park; Coach: Alex Burdon; Captain: Tom Leggo, Albert Burge

Newtown; 12th season Ground: Wentworth Park; Coach: Charles "Boxer" Russell; Captain: Albert "Ricketty" Johnston

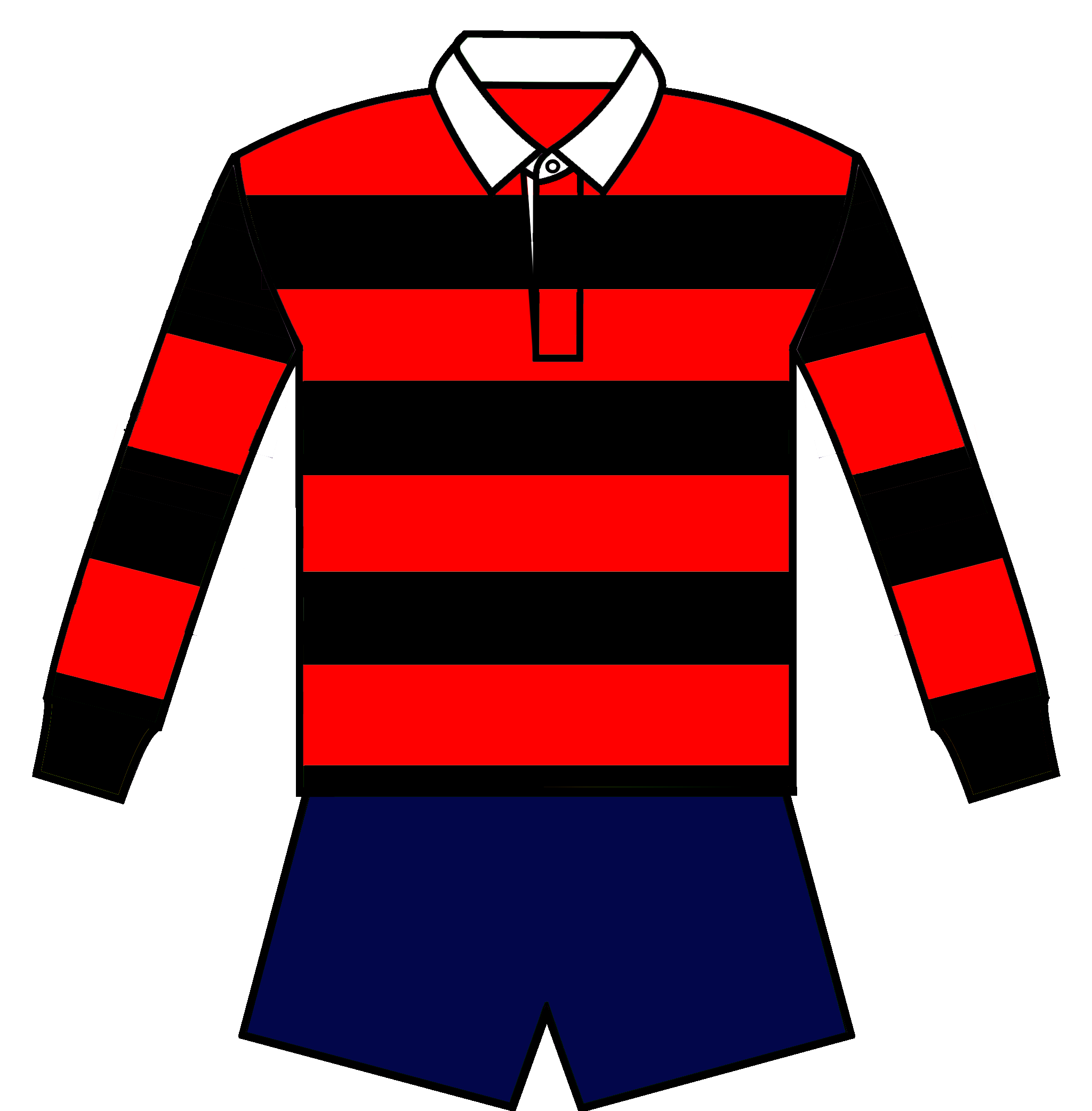
North Sydney; 12th season Ground: North Sydney Oval; Captain-Coach: George Green

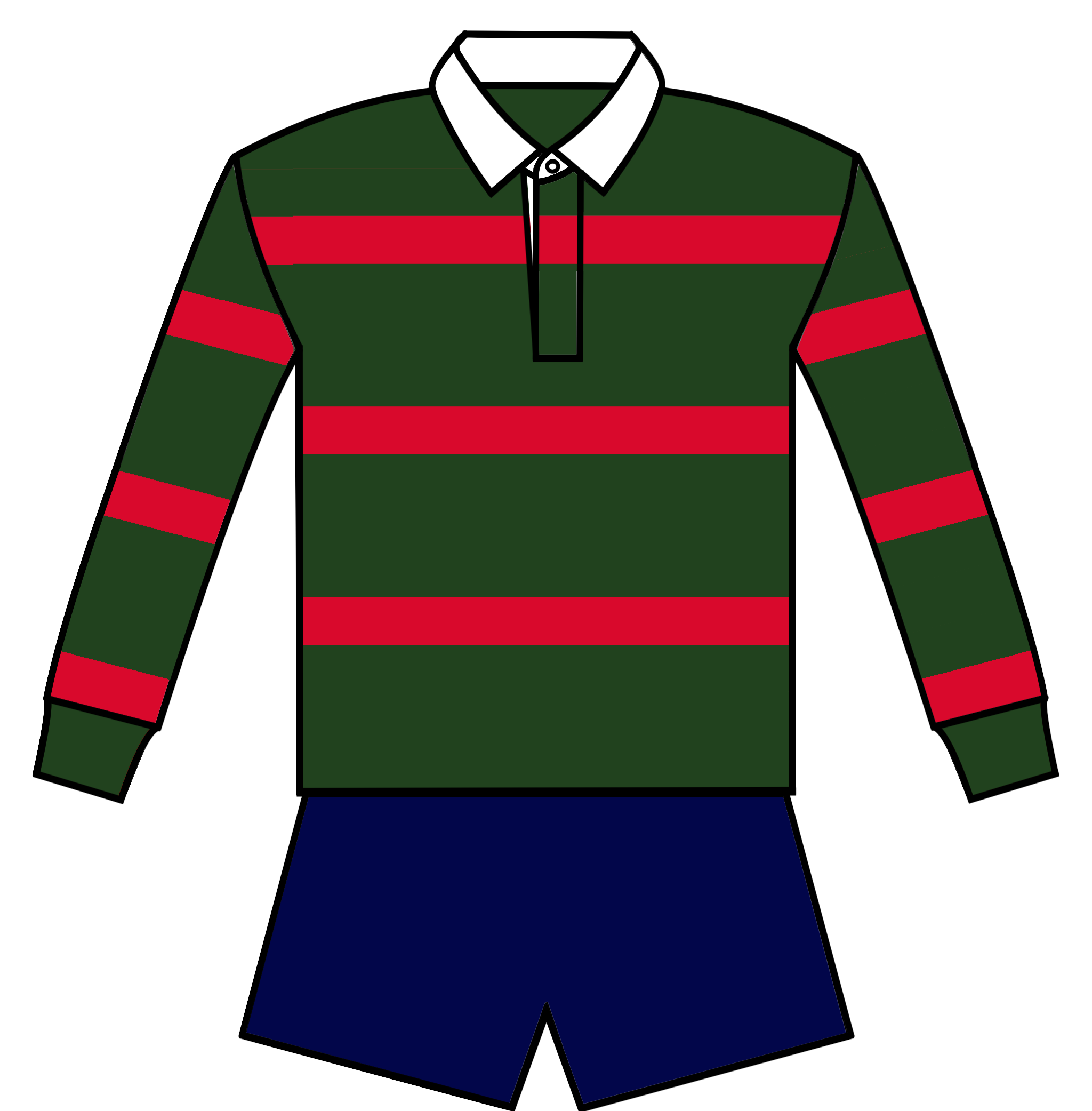
South Sydney; 12th season Ground: RAS Showground; Coach: Captain: Howard Hallett

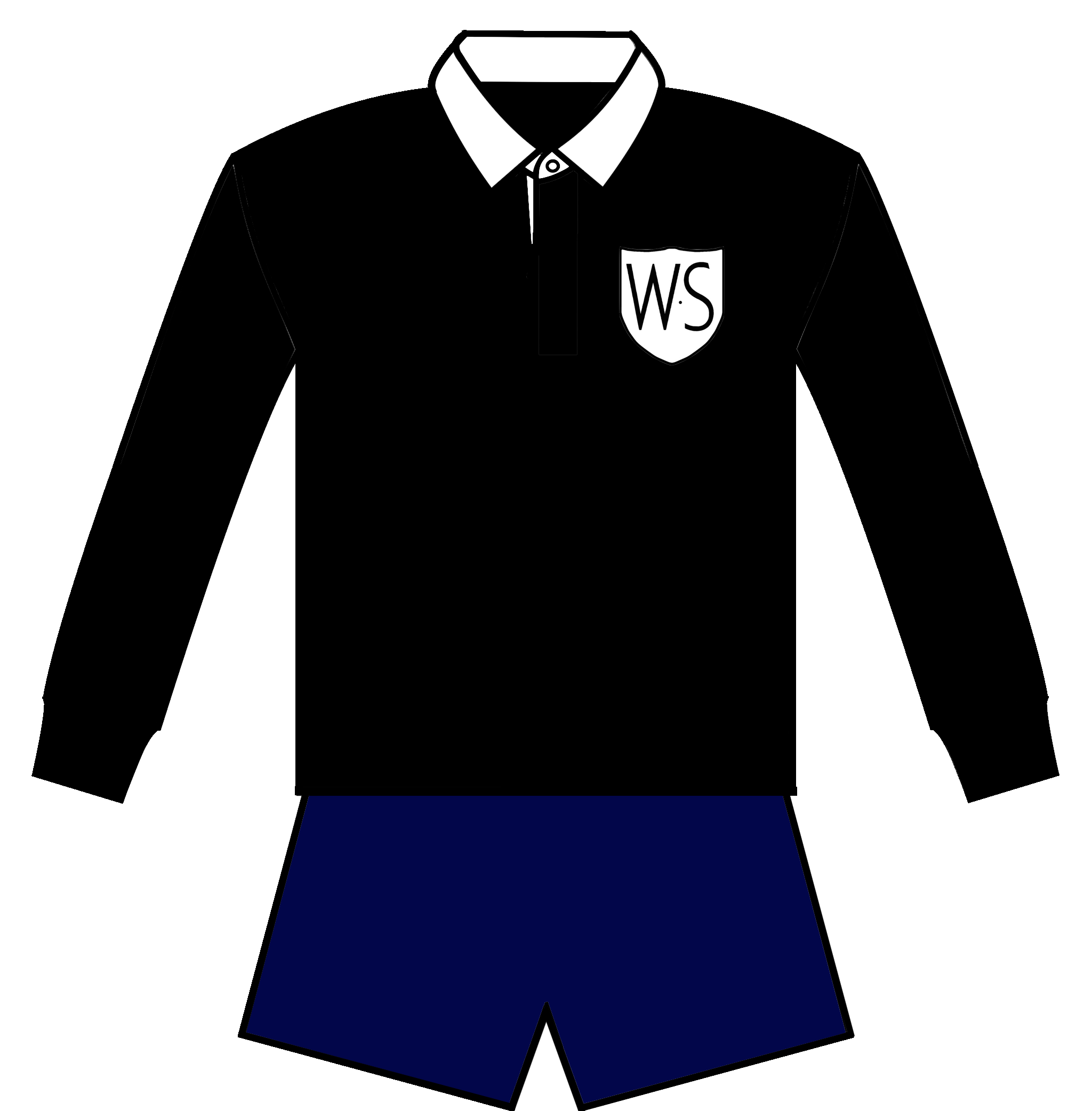
Western Suburbs; 12th season Ground: St. Luke's Oval; Coach: Captain: Tedda Courtney

=== Ladder ===
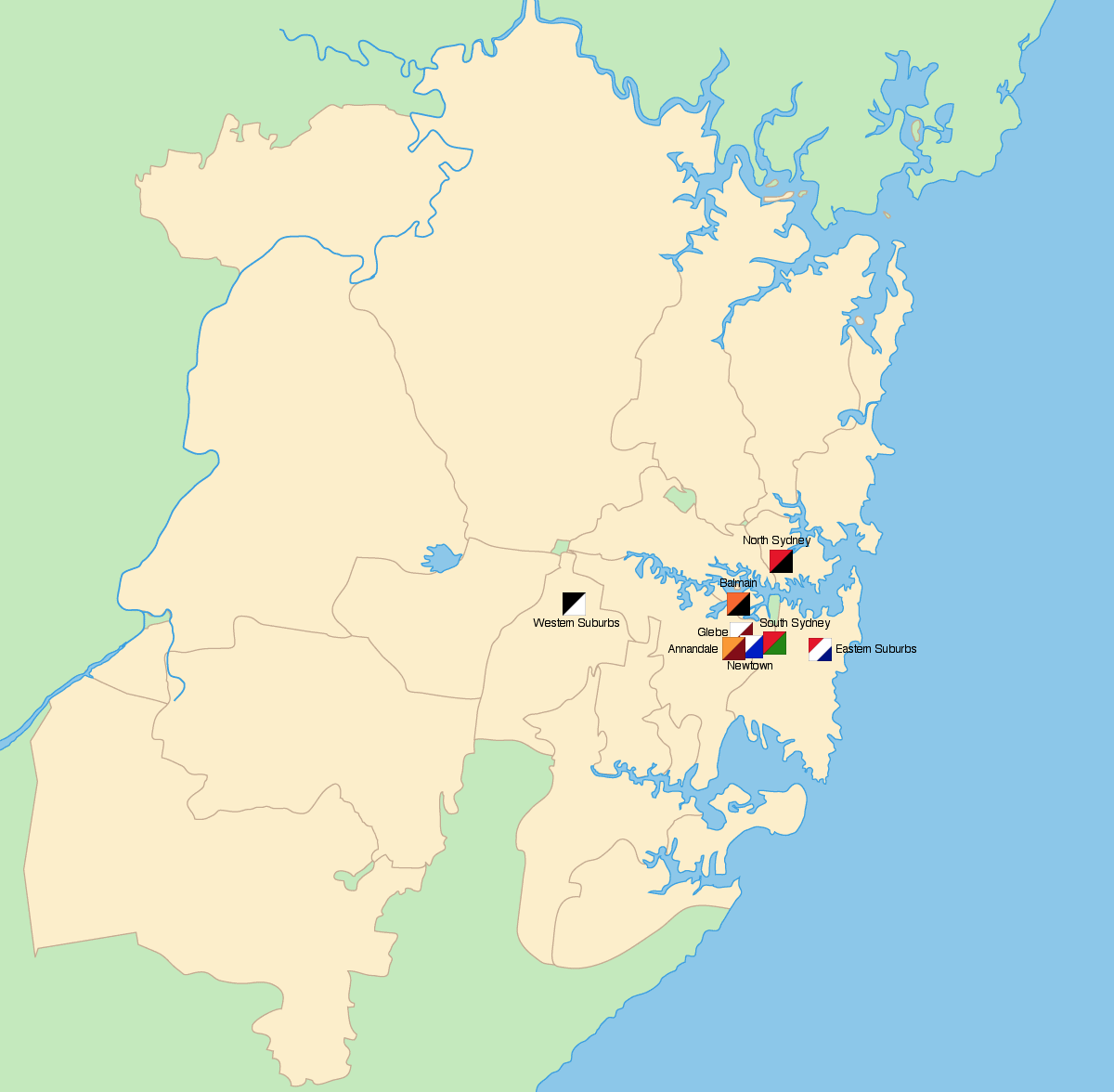
The geographical locations of the teams that contested the 1919 premiership across Sydney.

	Team	Pld	W	D	L	PF	PA	PD	Pts
1	Balmain	14	11	1	2	277	109	+168	23
2	Eastern Suburbs	14	9	2	3	229	108	+121	20
3	Western Suburbs	14	9	0	5	239	130	+109	18
4	Glebe	14	9	0	5	209	134	+75	18
5	Newtown	14	6	2	6	123	186	-63	14
6	South Sydney	14	6	1	7	208	223	-15	13
7	Annandale	14	1	1	12	86	270	-184	3
8	North Sydney	14	1	1	12	103	314	-211	3
