= Frank Gray (rugby league) =

Australian rugby league footballer

Personal information
- Full name: Frank Gray
- Born: 22 October 1905 Glebe, New South Wales, Australia
- Died: 13 August 1993 (aged 87)

Playing information
- Position: Second-row, Prop, Lock
Club
Years	Team	Pld	T	G	FG	P
1926–27	Glebe	13	4	0	0	12
1928–29	St. George	25	5	0	0	15
	Total	38	9	0	0	27
- Relatives: Bert Gray (brother); Paddy Gray (brother)

Frank Gray (22 October 1905 – 13 August 1993) was an Australian rugby league footballer who played in the 1920s.

== Playing career ==
The younger brother of Bert Gray and Paddy Gray, Gray debuted for Glebe before transferring to St. George in 1928.
