= Lloyd Edwards =

Australian rugby league footballer

Personal information
- Full name: Richard Lloyd Edwards
- Born: 25 June 1883 Rockhampton, Queensland, Australia
- Died: 28 January 1938 (aged 54)

Playing information
- Position: Wing, Five-eighth, Halfback, Centre
Club
Years	Team	Pld	T	G	FG	P
1908	Glebe	9	1	0	0	3
1909–10	Balmain	21	2	0	0	6
	Total	30	3	0	0	9
Representative
Years	Team	Pld	T	G	FG	P
1909	New South Wales	1	0	0	0	0
- Source: As of 15 February 2019

Lloyd Edwards was an Australian rugby league footballer who played in the 1900s and 1910s. He played for Glebe and was a foundation player of the club. Edwards also spent two seasons playing for Balmain.

== Playing career ==
Edwards made his first grade debut for Glebe in Round 1 1908 against Newcastle at Wentworth Park.

The match was the club's first ever game and also the opening week of the inaugural NSWRL competition. Glebe won the game 8-5 with Edwards playing on the wing.

In 1909, Edwards joined local rivals Balmain and played 2 seasons with the club.

Edwards also represented New South Wales in 1909 playing in 1 game against Queensland during the interstate series.
