= Stan King =

Australian rugby league footballer

Personal information
- Full name: Stanley Charles King
- Born: 22 March 1896 Woollahra, New South Wales, Australia
- Died: 14 August 1967 (aged 71)

Playing information
- Position: Hooker, Prop, Lock
Club
Years	Team	Pld	T	G	FG	P
1919–21	Eastern Suburbs	9	2	0	0	6
1923	Glebe	6	0	0	0	0
	Total	15	2	0	0	6

Stan King (22 March 1896 – 14 August 1967) was an Australian rugby league footballer who played for the Eastern Suburbs club and for Glebe. His older brother, Bill King, also played for Eastern Suburbs.
