= Ted Swinson =

Australian rugby league footballer

Personal information
- Full name: Edward Joseph Swinson
- Born: 1890 or 1891 Sydney, New South Wales, Australia
- Died: 14 June 1926 (aged 35) Sydney, New South Wales, Australia

Playing information
- Position: Prop, Second-row
Club
| Years | Team | Pld | T | G | FG | P |
|---|---|---|---|---|---|---|
| 1908–20 | Glebe | 108 | 6 | 0 | 0 | 18 |
Representative
| Years | Team | Pld | T | G | FG | P |
| 1911 | New South Wales | 1 | 0 | 0 | 0 | 0 |

Edward Joseph Swinson (c. 1891 – 14 June 1926) was an Australian rugby league footballer.

A forward, Swinson was a product of Sydney club Gipps Borough and from 1908 to 1920 played first–grade for Glebe. He gained representative honours for New South Wales in 1911.

Swinson lived on York street in Sydney and was employed as a wharf labourer.

In 1926, Swinson died aged 35 of head injuries sustained in a fall.
