= Tom Gleeson (rugby league) =

Australian rugby league footballer

Personal information
- Full name: Thomas Patrick Gleeson
- Born: 1889 Kempsey, New South Wales
- Died: 27 June 1931 (aged 41–42) drowned at La Perouse, New South Wales

Playing information
- Position: Wing, Centre
Club
Years	Team	Pld	T	G	FG	P
1911–12	Glebe	28	17	0	0	51
1914–22	Huddersfield					0
1923	Glebe	1	1	0	0	3
	Total	29	18	0	0	54
Representative
Years	Team	Pld	T	G	FG	P
1912	New South Wales	3	5	0	0	15
1912	Metropolis	1	0	0	0	0

Thomas Patrick Gleeson (1889-1931) was an Australian rugby league footballer from the 1910s.

Former Glebe centre Tom Gleeson also had a long career with Huddersfield Giants in England where he partnered the legendary Albert Rosenfeld. "Australian Tommy Gleeson, signed in November 1912 from the Glebe club in Sydney, just three months before protests from the New South Wales Rugby League resulted in a ban on overseas players - a ban which was effective for fourteen years."

He did not return to Australia until after the first world war and played one final season with Glebe in 1923.

== Death ==
Tom Gleeson died when he dived in the ocean from rocks near La Perouse, New South Wales to save his son Martin (aged 12) who had already been washed off the rocks while fishing. Tom Gleeson drowned soon after, and his son also drowned .
