= Peter Burge (rugby) =

Australian RL coach and Australia international dual-code rugby footballer

Personal information
- Full name: Peter Harold Boyne Burge
- Born: 14 February 1884 Penrith, New South Wales
- Died: 15 July 1956 (aged 72) Hurstville, New South Wales

Playing information

Rugby union
- Position: lock
Club
Years	Team	Pld	T	G	FG	P
1904–08	South Sydney
Representative
Years	Team	Pld	T	G	FG	P
1907	Australia	3				0
1905–08	New South Wales	3

Rugby league
- Position: Second-row
Club
Years	Team	Pld	T	G	FG	P
1910	South Sydney	1				0
1911–14	Glebe Dirty Reds	15	1			3
	Total	16	1	0	0	3
Representative
Years	Team	Pld	T	G	FG	P
1911–12	Australia	0

Coaching information
Club
Years	Team	Gms	W	D	L	W%
1937	St George Dragons
- Relatives: Albert Burge (brother); Frank Burge (brother); Laidley Burge (brother)

Peter Harold Boyne Burge (14 February 1884 – 15 July 1956) was an Australian rugby footballer and coach. He represented his country in both rugby league and rugby union. The eldest of the four Burge brothers, Peter was one of the first Australian dual-code rugby internationals.

== Rugby union career ==
Playing rugby union with South Sydney in 1904 the twenty-year-old Burge was selected for the Metropolis (City) representative side against the Great Britain tourists. When the All Blacks toured in 1905 Burge played against them firstly for Metropolis and then in a New South Wales side.

Burge, a lock claimed a total of three international rugby caps for Australia. In two of these matches, he served as captain. His debut game was against New Zealand, at Sydney, on 20 July 1907. He made two rugby union tours, to New Zealand in 1905 with the first full Australian team and later on the epic 1908–09 Australia rugby union tour of Britain under captain Paddy Moran. On both trips he only played one game due to injury. On the Wallaby tour of 1908 he broke his tibia in his first match against Devon. He took no further part in the tour and one of the replacements sent over to fill the touring squad was his brother Albert Burge.

== Rugby league career ==
He was one of the fourteen 1908–09 Wallabies including Chris McKivat, Charles McMurtie, "Boxer" Russell and Arthur McCabe who defected to rugby league after their return from the Olympics and the epic tour. In Burge's case he joined his brother Alby in the 1909 "Wallabies v Kangaroos" promotional match which then disqualified him from the amateur code.

He joined the South Sydney Rabbitohs in 1910 but then the following year linked with Alby and Frank at Glebe.

He toured Great Britain on the 1911–12 Kangaroo tour of Great Britain, captained by his former Wallaby and then Glebe captain, Chris McKivat. He made four tour matches appearances for Australia.

Along with McMurtie and Bob Stuart, Peter Burge made his international league debut in a tour match on that 1911 tour but did not play in any Tests. Collectively they were therefore Australia's 17th to 19th dual-code rugby internationals.

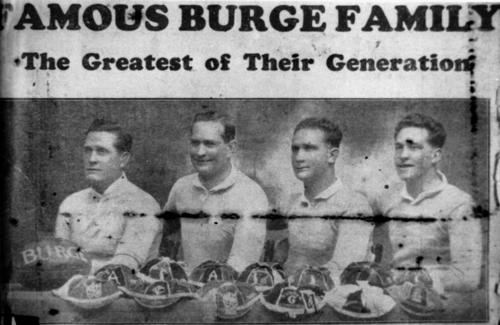
The Burge family

== Coaching career ==
Like Frank Burge had done in 1927, Peter in 1937 coached the St. George Dragons.

== Death ==
Peter Burge died suddenly at his brother Frank's house in Hurstville, New South Wales on 15 July 1956, age 72. He was buried at Waverley Cemetery with his parents, Peter and Emily Burge.

== See also ==
Sporting positions
Preceded by Frank Nicholson	Captain Australia; 1907	Succeeded by Allen Oxlade
