= Tom McCabe (rugby league) =

English rugby league player

Personal information
- Full name: Thomas McCabe
- Born: 21 August 1881 Widnes, Cheshire, England
- Died: 29 August 1960 (aged 79) Liverpool, England

Playing information
- Position: Forward
Club
| Years | Team | Pld | T | G | FG | P |
|---|---|---|---|---|---|---|
| 1902–06 | Widnes | 90 | 0 | 0 | 0 | 0 |
| 1906 | Wigan | 24 | 2 | 0 | 0 | 6 |
| 1908 | Glebe | 9 | 3 | 0 | 0 | 9 |
| 1909–12 | Oldham | 85 | 10 | 0 | 0 | 30 |
| | Total | 208 | 15 | 0 | 0 | 45 |
Representative
| Years | Team | Pld | T | G | FG | P |
| 1908–10 | New South Wales | 5 | 6 | 0 | 0 | 18 |
| 1908–09 | Australia | 2 | 0 | 0 | 0 | 0 |

Thomas McCabe (21 August 1881 – 29 August 1960) was an English rugby league player. Born and raised in Widnes, McCabe was a pioneer of the sport in Australia, having moved there as a young adult.

== Biography ==
Prior to emigrating to Australia, McCabe had played rugby league in England for Widnes and Wigan.

McCabe, a forward, competed with Glebe in the 1908 NSWRFL season and appeared for Australia in the first ever Test between them and New Zealand, held that year at Sydney's Royal Agricultural Society Showground. He also featured on the 1908–09 tour of Great Britain, where he remained and had several seasons with Oldham.
