= Tom McGrath (rugby league) =

Australian rugby league footballer

Personal information
- Full name: Thomas McGrath
- Born: 20 October 1898; Glebe, New South Wales, Australia
- Died: 11 January 1976 (aged 77); Glebe, New South Wales, Australia

Playing information
- Position: Second-row, Prop
Club
Years	Team	Pld	T	G	FG	P
1917–27	Glebe	79	13	0	0	39
Representative
Years	Team	Pld	T	G	FG	P
1926	Metropolis	1	0	0	0	0
- Source: As of 7 May 2020

Thomas McGrath (1898–1976) was an Australian rugby league footballer who played in the 1910s and 1920s.

== Playing career ==
McGrath had a long career at the Glebe Dirty Reds. Known by the nickname of 'Chaff', he played eight seasons in first grade for Glebe: 1917 and 1921–1927. He played in lock-forward in the 1922 Final Glebe team that were defeated 35–3 by North Sydney at the Sydney Cricket Ground.

== Death ==
A resident of Glebe, New South Wales his entire life, McGrath died on 11 January 1976, aged 77.
