= Ned Goddard =

Australian rugby league player

Personal information
- Full name: Edward Goddard
- Born: 25 August 1900; Sydney, NSW, Australia
- Died: 29 March 1955 (aged 54)

Playing information
- Position: Forward
Club
Years	Team	Pld	T	G	FG	P
1923–29	Glebe	82	29	0	0	87
Representative
Years	Team	Pld	T	G	FG	P
1926	New South Wales	7	4	0	0	12
- Relatives: Bill Killiby (nephew)

Edward Goddard (25 August 1900 – 29 March 1955) was an Australian rugby league player.

A ginger-haired, lightweight forward, Goddard was a permanent fixture in the Glebe first-grade side of the 1920s and played second-row for New South Wales in 1926. His wiry frame restricted his representative opportunities.

Goddard was the uncle of St. George lock Bill Killiby.
