= Alex Main (rugby league) =

Australian rugby league footballer

Personal information
- Full name: Alexander Main
- Born: 1 May 1900; Leichhardt, New South Wales, Australia
- Died: 16 August 1973 (aged 73); Caringbah, New South Wales, Australia

Playing information
- Position: Fullback
Club
Years	Team	Pld	T	G	FG	P
1920–22	Newtown	29	0	40	0	80
1923	Glebe	1	0	0	0	0
1924	St. George	6	0	0	0	0
	Total	36	0	40	0	80

Alexander Main (1900–1973) was an Australian rugby league footballer who played in the 1920s.

== Playing career ==
Former Newtown, Glebe and St. George fullback relocated to the Tamworth, New South Wales as a player/coach in 1925 where he remained into the 1930s. Main played representative football for Northern Division in 1925 and North West N.S.W. in 1930 against touring rep teams.

== Death ==
Main died on 16 August 1973 at Caringbah, New South Wales.
