= Bill Killiby =

Australian rugby league footballer

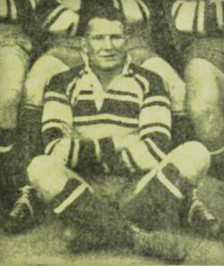
- Bill Killiby. 1933

Personal information
- Full name: William John Reginald Killiby
- Born: 16 January 1911 Balmain, New South Wales, Australia
- Died: 9 May 1979 (aged 68) Kurri Kurri, New South Wales, Australia

Playing information
- Position: Lock
Club
Years	Team	Pld	T	G	FG	P
1933–35	St George Dragons	39	11	0	0	33
- Source: Whiticker/Hudson
- Relatives: Ned Goddard (uncle)

Bill Killiby (16 January 1911 – 9 May 1979) was an Australian rugby league footballer who played in the 1930s.

He played three seasons of first grade with St George Dragons between 1933-1935 and retired at the end of the 1940 season in Reserve Grade.

Killiby played lock-forward in the 1933 Grand Final against Newtown. Killiby's last game was on 30 August 1940 in the Reserve Grade Grand Final in which St. George Dragons won 29–10.

== War service ==
Killiby served with the Australian Army in New Guinea in World War II. He was discharged due to injury in October 1944.

== Death ==
Killiby died on 9 May 1979.
