= Ron Stapleton =

Australian rugby league footballer

Personal information
- Full name: Reginald Jerome Stapleton
- Born: 24 August 1900; Newtown, New South Wales, Australia
- Died: 15 January 1968 (aged 67)

Playing information
- Position: Fullback, Wing
Club
Years	Team	Pld	T	G	FG	P
1918–22	Glebe	27	6	0	0	18

Ron Stapleton also known as "Reg Stapleton" was an Australian rugby league footballer who played in the 1910s and 1920s. He played for Glebe in the New South Wales Rugby League (NSWRL) competition.

== Playing career ==
Stapleton made his first grade debut for Glebe against Western Suburbs in Round 11 1918 at the Royal Agricultural Society Grounds. In 1920, Stapleton made 5 appearances as Glebe finished second on the table behind rivals Balmain.

In 1922, Glebe finished equal first on the table behind minor premiers North Sydney. Glebe and North Sydney were then required to contest a grand final to determine the outright premiership winner.

Stapleton played at fullback for Glebe in the 1922 NSWRL grand final which was played at the Sydney Cricket Ground in front of 15,000 spectators. Although both sides finished on equal points, North Sydney outclassed Glebe in the final by a score of 35-3. The grand final defeat was Stapleton's last game for Glebe.
