= Paddy Gray (cricketer) =

Australian sportsperson

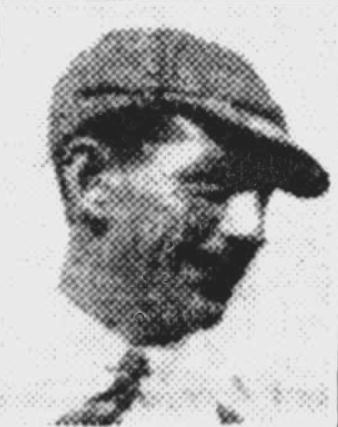

Personal information
- Full name: Arthur Thomas Gray
- Born: 12 June 1892; Sydney, Australia
- Died: 19 July 1977 (aged 85); Sydney, Australia
- Source: Cricinfo, 30 December 2016
- Rugby league career

Playing information
Club
Years	Team	Pld	T	G	FG	P
1917–1921	Glebe	26	8	15		54
1924–1927	Glebe	32	4			12
	Total	58	12	15	0	66
- Relatives: Bert Gray (brother); Frank Gray (brother)

Paddy Gray (12 June 1892 – 19 July 1977) was an Australian cricketer and rugby league footballer. He played seven first-class cricket matches for New South Wales between 1922/23 and 1924/25. As a rugby league footballer he played first-grade for Glebe in the NSWRFL.

== See also ==
- List of New South Wales representative cricketers
