= Tony Redmond =

Australian rugby league footballer

Personal information
- Full name: James Patrick Redmond
- Born: 2 September 1890 Glebe, Sydney, Australia
- Died: 27 June 1963 (aged 72) Sydney, Australia

Playing information
- Position: Hooker, Second-row
Club
Years	Team	Pld	T	G	FG	P
1911–14	Glebe	45	11	0	0	33
1917–20	Western Suburbs	43	3	3	0	15
1921	St. George	7	1	0	0	3
1922–23	Glebe	22	0	45	0	90
1924	Western Suburbs	1	0	1	0	2
	Total	118	15	49	0	143
Representative
Years	Team	Pld	T	G	FG	P
1914	Metropolis	1	1	0	0	3

James Patrick Redmond (1890–1963), also known by the nickname of "Tony", was a pioneer Australian rugby league footballer who played in the 1910s and 1920s. He played for Glebe (twice), Western Suburbs (twice) and for St George. He played at hooker but also played at second-row.

== Playing career ==
A local from Glebe in inner Sydney, Redmond was a forward who played 14 seasons of first grade rugby league, during the early years of the NSWRFL. He made his debut for Glebe in 1911 and in the same year played in the 1911 grand final against Eastern Suburbs which Easts won 11–8.

Always known by the nickname of 'Tony', Redmond also represented the AIF during World War I.

Redmond next played for Western Suburbs, where the club finished in the top half of the table each season he played there. In 1921, Redmond joined St George and played in the club's first ever game against his former club Glebe. In 1922, Redmond rejoined Glebe and played in his second grand final against a star studded North Sydney side comprising the likes of Harold Horder, Cec Blinkhorn and Duncan Thompson. Glebe lost the match 35–3 in a heavy defeat. In 1924, Redmond moved back to Western Suburbs and played one last game for the club before retiring.

Although mainly remembered as a player for Glebe and the Western Suburbs club, Redmond is also remembered as a member of the first St. George team in 1921.

== Death ==
Redmond died in Sydney in 1963, aged 73.
