= Norm Proctor =

Australian rugby league footballer

Personal information
- Full name: Norman Proctor
- Born: 1893; Forbes, New South Wales, Australia
- Died: 13 February 1973 (aged 79–80)

Playing information
- Position: Fullback
Club
Years	Team	Pld	T	G	FG	P
1916–21	Glebe	66	4	1	0	14
1922–24	North Sydney	21	2	1	0	8
	Total	87	6	2	0	22
Representative
Years	Team	Pld	T	G	FG	P
1922	New South Wales	5	0	0	0	0
1919–22	Metropolis	3	0	0	0	0

Norm Proctor was an Australian rugby league footballer who played from the 1910s to the 1920s. He played in the NSWRFL premiership for North Sydney and Glebe as a fullback.

== Playing career ==
Proctor began his first grade career in 1916 with Glebe before moving to Norths at the end of 1921. Proctor was a member of the North Sydney team which won their second premiership in 1922 defeating his former club Glebe in the grand final 35–3. Proctor also played representative football for New South Wales making 5 appearances. Proctor retired at the end of the 1924 season.
