= Albert Conlon =

Australian rugby league footballer

Personal information
- Full name: Albert Richard Conlon
- Born: 14 Jul 1880; Glebe, New South Wales
- Died: 9 July 1956 (aged 75); Brisbane, Queensland

Playing information
- Position: Five-Eighth
Club
Years	Team	Pld	T	G	FG	P
1908–10	Glebe	10	2	20	1	48
1912	Wests	9	1	1	0	5
	Total	19	3	21	1	53
Representative
Years	Team	Pld	T	G	FG	P
1908–1909	Australia	5	1	0	0	3
1908	N.S.W.	3	1	1		5
- Source: Whiticker/Hudson

Albert Richard Conlon (1880–1956) was an Australian pioneer rugby league footballer from the 1900s.

Former Glebe Rugby Union five-eighth captained the amateur club to the Metropolitan premiership in 1907. Conlon changed to the professional code in 1908 while champion playmakers Chris McKivat and Freddy Woods remained with the Glebe RU in order to play in the inaugural Wallabies Tour at the end of the year.

== Rugby League career ==
Conlon played three seasons with Glebe before ending his career at Wests in 1912.

Albert Conlon represented New South Wales in two matches in 1908 before touring with the pioneer 1908–09 Kangaroo tour of Great Britain. Conlon made his Test debut in the Second Test against England but injury limited him to just 6 other minor tour matches. Conlon was selected in the centres in two Tests against NZ the following year. He is remembered as Kangaroo No.32.

After his retirement as a player in 1920, he moved to Queensland and was a selector for the Brisbane Rugby League for many years.

He remained in Queensland for the rest of his life. Conlon died on 9 Jul 1956 in Brisbane, Queensland.
