= Dave Garlick =

Australian rugby league footballer

Personal information
- Full name: David William Garlick
- Born: 23 January 1887 Melbourne, Victoria
- Died: 19 June 1964 (aged 77) Forestville, New South Wales

Playing information
- Position: Wing
Club
Years	Team	Pld	T	G	FG	P
1911–14	Glebe	38	20	0	0	60
1919	North Sydney	1	0	0	0	0
	Total	39	20	0	0	60
Representative
Years	Team	Pld	T	G	FG	P
1912	New South Wales	1	1	0	0	3
1912	Metropolis	2	3	0	0	9

David William Garlick (1887–1964) was a pioneer Australian rugby league footballer who played in the 1910s.

== Background ==
Garlick was born to parents Richard and Jessie Garlick in Melbourne, Victoria in 1887. The family had moved to Sydney in the early 1900s and Garlick was brought up in a house at Glebe Point Road, Glebe, New South Wales.

== Playing career ==
A convert from the Glebe rugby union ranks, Dave Garlick turned out for the Glebe Dirty Reds in 1911 and played four seasons between 1911 and 1914. In his first year in first grade, Garlick was 1911's top try scorer with 13 tries from 16 games. Garlick's best year was 1912, when he represented Sydney (Metropolis) on two occasions, and represented New South Wales in one match, also in 1912.

Garlick returned to play one last season with North Sydney in 1919 before retiring from the game aged 32.

== Death ==
Garlick died at his Forestville, New South Wales home on 19 June 1964, aged 77.
