= Roy Algie =

Australian rugby league footballer

Personal information
- Full name: Leslie Roy Algie
- Born: 31 December 1888; Glebe, New South Wales, Australia
- Died: 24 January 1946 (aged 57); Five Dock, New South Wales, Australia

Playing information
- Position: Fullback
Club
Years	Team	Pld	T	G	FG	P
1910–14	Glebe	52	39	52	3	227
1916	Balmain	1	0	0	0	0
	Total	53	39	52	3	227
Representative
Years	Team	Pld	T	G	FG	P
1913	New South Wales	3	8	0	0	24

Leslie Roy 'Bunny' Algie (1888–1946) was an Australian rugby league footballer who played in the 1910s.

== Background ==
Algie was born at Glebe, New South Wales in 1888.

== Playing career ==
Algie played fullback for the Glebe Dirty Reds between 1910 and 1914. He played 55 first grade games for Glebe and was a prolific point scorer. 'Bunny' Algie scored 24 tries, 28 goals and 3 field goals (total 134 points) during his career at Glebe. He was also the NSWRFL season top try scorer in 1912.

Algie finished his career at Balmain, playing one season in 1916.

Algie died on 24 January 1946.
