= William Stirton =

Australian rugby league footballer

Personal information
- Full name: William Hilton Stirton
- Born: 10 January 1893 Dubbo, New South Wales, Australia
- Died: 23 August 1947 (aged 54) Newtown, New South Wales, Australia

Playing information
- Position: Five-eighth, Centre
Club
Years	Team	Pld	T	G	FG	P
1919–23	Glebe	12	1	0	0	3
- Source: As of 8 February 2019

William Stirton (1893–1947) was an Australian rugby league footballer who played in the 1910s and 1920s. He played five-eighth for Glebe Dirty Reds in four seasons between 1919 and 1923.

== Background ==
Stirton was born in Dubbo, New South Wales.

== Playing career ==
Stirton made his debut for Glebe against Western Suburbs in Round 6 1919 scoring a try in an 8–5 victory. Stirton played in Glebe's 1922 NSWRL grand final loss against North Sydney which Norths won in convincing fashion 35–3 at the Sydney Cricket Ground.

He died at Newtown, New South Wales in 1947.
