= Harry Brighton =

English rugby league footballer

Personal information
- Full name: Herbert George Brighton
- Born: 1881; Bristol, England
- Died: 17 June 1950 (aged 68–69); Sydney, New South Wales, Australia

Playing information
- Position: Second-row, Hooker
Club
Years	Team	Pld	T	G	FG	P
1911–12	Glebe	30	0	0	0	0
1913	South Sydney	9	0	0	0	0
	Total	39	0	0	0	0
Representative
Years	Team	Pld	T	G	FG	P
1912	New South Wales	1	0	0	0	0
1912	Metropolis	1	0	0	0	0
- Source: As of 20 March 2019

Harry Brighton (1881–1950) was an Australian rugby league footballer who played in the 1910s. He played for Glebe and South Sydney in the NSWRL competition.

== Playing career ==
Brighton made his first grade debut for Glebe in Round 1 1911 against Western Suburbs at the Sydney Sports Ground.

Brighton played 16 times for Glebe in 1911 as the club finished first on the table and claimed the minor premiership. Brighton played at hooker in the 1911 NSWRL grand final against Eastern Suburbs at the Agricultural Ground. In a tight match, Easts emerged victorious winning their first premiership by a score of 11–8 in front of 20,000 spectators.

In 1912, Brighton played 14 games as Glebe finished second on the table but were again runners up to Eastern Suburbs as they claimed their second premiership.

In 1913, Brighton joined South Sydney and played with them for one season before retiring. At representative level, Brighton played for New South Wales and Metropolis in 1912.
