= Albert Burge =

Australia international rugby union & league player (1889-1943)

- Born: Albert Bentley Burge; 4 June 1889 Penrith, New South Wales
- Died: 4 January 1943 (aged 53) Hornsby, New South Wales

Rugby union career
- Position: lock
International career
Years	Team	Apps	(Points)
1907–1908	Wallabies	2	(0)
- Rugby league career

Playing information
- Position: Prop/Second Row
Club
Years	Team	Pld	T	G	FG	P
1910	South Sydney
1911–19	Glebe
	Total	0	0	0	0	0
- Relatives: Frank Burge (brother); Laidley Burge (brother); Peter Burge (brother)

Albert Bentley "Son" Burge (4 June 1889 – 4 January 1943) was an Australian rugby union lock who played with the Souths rugby union club in Sydney and at the age of nineteen was selected for the Australian national team in two Tests against New Zealand in 1907.

== Rugby union career ==
He made the Wallaby tour of Great Britain of 1908, called up as a squad replacement for his brother Peter who broke his leg. Alby appeared in a Test match against Wales. He was sent off for kicking in that match and did not make another rugby international appearance. Despite his sending off, Burge continued to be selected for the invitational matches against club opposition during the tour. Two weeks after the Wales match, Burge was part of the Australian team that faced Cardiff, and was again sent from the pitch by referee Gil Evans after 'brutally' kicking Dai Westacott while the player was prone on the ground.

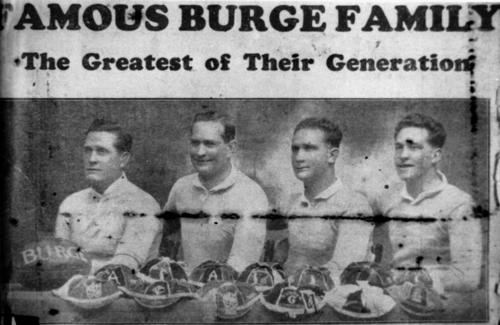
The Burge family

== Rugby league career ==
'Alby' Burge switched to rugby league football initially joining South Sydney but then in 1911 he joined his brother Frank at Glebe. Albert was the captain of the Glebe side that lost the 1911 New South Wales Rugby League premiership final to Easts and captained the side.

He and his brother Frank, continued to captain Glebe until his retirement after the 1919 NSWRFL season. He also had a brief stint with the North Sydney Bears in 1913.
