= Ed Summers (rugby league) =

Australian rugby league footballer

Personal information
- Full name: Edward Summers
- Born: 1894; Sydney, New South Wales, Australia
- Died: 28 December 1973 (aged 78–79)

Playing information
- Position: Centre
Club
Years	Team	Pld	T	G	FG	P
1919–23	Glebe	43	10	0	0	30

Ed Summers was an Australian rugby league footballer who played in the 1910s and 1920s. He played for Glebe in the New South Wales Rugby League (NSWRL) competition.

== Playing career ==
Summers made his first grade debut for Glebe against Eastern Suburbs in Round 9 1919 at the Sydney Cricket Ground. Glebe would go on to finish the 1919 season in third place.

The following year in 1920, Glebe would go on to finish second on the table behind premiers Balmain. In 1922, Glebe finished equal first on the table behind minor premiers North Sydney. Glebe and North Sydney were then required to contest a grand final to determine the outright premiership winner.

Summers played in the centres for Glebe in the 1922 NSWRL grand final which was played at the Sydney Cricket Ground in front of 15,000 spectators. Although both sides finished on equal points, North Sydney outclassed Glebe in the final by a score of 35-3. Summers scored Glebe's only points in the final with a second half try. Summers retired the following season in 1923.
