= Bert Gray (rugby league) =

Australia international rugby league footballer

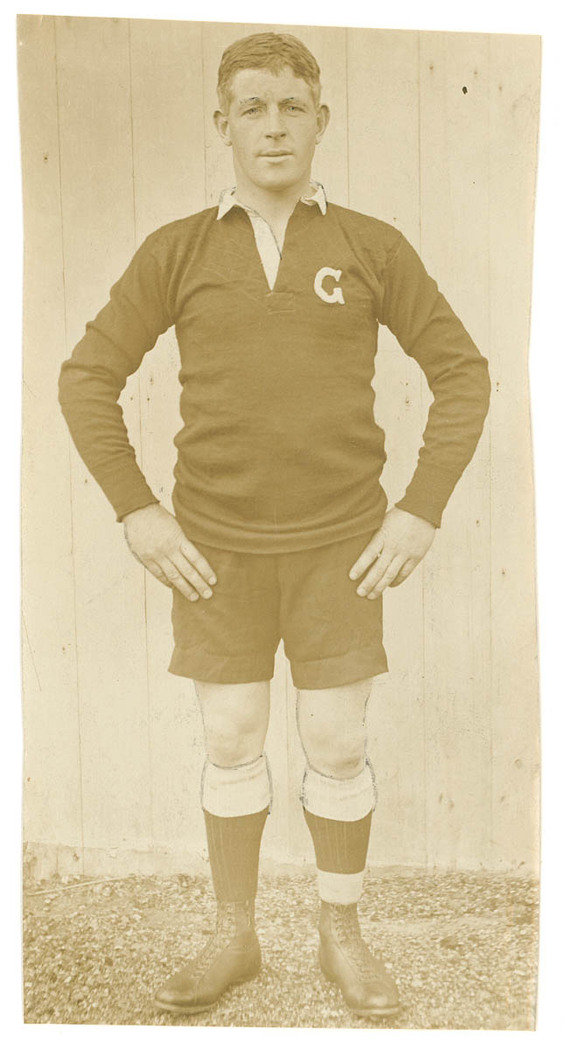

Personal information
- Full name: Alfred Bert Gray
- Born: 1 August 1890; Glebe, New South Wales, Australia
- Died: 17 December 1967 (aged 77); Bondi, New South Wales, Australia

Playing information
- Position: Lock, Second-row, Hooker
Club
Years	Team	Pld	T	G	FG	P
1912–26	Glebe	102	33	1	0	101
Representative
Years	Team	Pld	T	G	FG	P
1913–22	New South Wales	19	8	0	0	24
1920–21	Australia	4	1	0	0	3
1915–23	Metropolis	4	0	1	0	2
- Relatives: Paddy Gray (brother); Frank Gray (brother)

Alfred Bert Gray (1890–1967) was an Australian rugby league footballer who played for Glebe in the NSWRL competition in the 1910s and 1920s. He represented New South Wales and Australia.

== Background ==
Born in Glebe, New South Wales to parents Ernest and Jane Gray, Gray learnt the game of rugby in the Glebe rugby union juniors before switching to rugby league. His younger brothers Paddy and Frank were also first-grade rugby league players. Another brother, Tom, played reserve grade for Glebe.

== Playing career ==
Gray played in twelve first grade seasons for Glebe between 1912 and 1926. Following a three season absence while serving in World War I, Gray returned to first grade in 1919.

Gray was selected to represent Australia during the 1920 Ashes series against Great Britain. He was selected again for Australia for their tour of Great Britain in 1921–22. He played just five matches during this tour after suffering a knee injury. This knee injury hampered the remainder of his career, and was ultimately the cause of his retirement in May 1925.

Gray came out of retirement for the 1926 season after the twelve month break afforded him a chance to rest and recover.

He played in the 1922 Grand Final for the Glebe team that was defeated by North Sydney Bears 35–3.

== Post-playing career ==
Gray was a selector for Australia, New South Wales, and Metropolis for a total of 20 years until retiring in 1952.

== Death ==
Gray died on 17 December 1967, aged 77.
