= Laidley Burge =

Australian rugby union and rugby league footballer

Personal information
- Full name: Laidley Burge
- Born: 4 December 1896 Sydney, New South Wales, Australia
- Died: 17 September 1990 (aged 93) Gold Coast, Queensland

Playing information
- Position: Second-row, Prop
Club
Years	Team	Pld	T	G	FG	P
1916–22	Glebe	64	9	11	0	49
Representative
Years	Team	Pld	T	G	FG	P
1919	Metropolis	1	0	1	0	2
- Source: As of 6 May 2020
- Relatives: Albert Burge (brother); Frank Burge (brother); Peter Burge (brother)

Laidley Burge (1896–1990) was a rugby league footballer in New South Wales during the 1910s and 1920s.

== Playing career ==
Burge played seven seasons and 64 first grade games for the Glebe Dirty Reds between 1916 and 1922, many of them alongside his brother Frank Burge.

He and Frank formed a front-row partnership in the Glebe side that contested the 1922 NSWRL Grand final against North Sydney which Glebe lost 35-3 at the Sydney Cricket Ground. He retired from rugby league after that game.

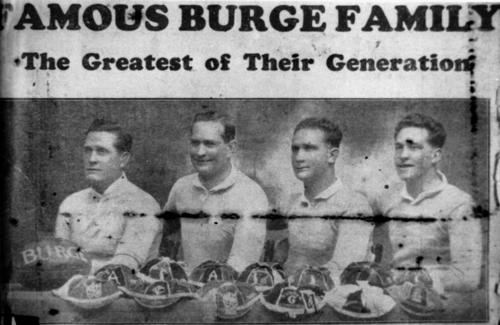
The Burge family

== Death ==
Burge died on 17 September 1990, age 93 at his home at Gold Coast, Queensland and was the last of the famous Burge brothers to die.

== Sources ==
- Andrews, Malcolm (2006) The ABC of Rugby League, Austn Broadcasting Corpn, Sydney
- Whiticker, Alan (2004) Captaining the Kangaroos, New Holland, Sydney
- Whiticker, Alan & Hudson, Glen (2006) The Encyclopedia of Rugby League Players, Gavin Allen Publishing, Sydney
- Whiticker, Alan & Collis, Ian (2006) The History of Rugby League Clubs, New Holland, Sydney
- Heads, Ian & Middleton, David (2008) A Centenary of Rugby League, MacMillan, Sydney.
- Howell, Max (2005) Born to Lead: Wallaby Test Captains, Celebrity Books, Auckland, NZ.
