= Austin Sherry =

Australian rugby league player

Playing information
- Position: Centre, Halfback
Club
Years	Team	Pld	T	G	FG	P
1923, 1925–1927	Glebe	17	2	9	0	24

Austin Sherry was an Australian professional rugby league footballer who played for Glebe of the New South Wales Rugby League Premiership.

== Playing career ==
Sherry made his debut for the club in round 16 of the 1923 season against Balmain. He kicked a goal, though his team lost 15–19. Sherry did not play another game until the opening round of the 1925 season. He started at five-eighth and scored the first try of his career to help his team defeat St. George. Two rounds later, he kicked a goal and scored a try in a win against Eastern Suburbs. In Round 10, he kicked 2 goals in a narrow 1-point win over North Sydney. He finished the season with 3 goals and 2 tries in 9 appearances.

Sherry only played one game in the 1926 season. He kicked 5 goals in a win against Newtown. He played the following game - a semi final matchup against Sydney University. Glebe were shocked 3-29 by University - who already had 3 wooden spoons in the last 5 years and had never made a finals appearance prior to the season.

In 1927, Sherry played 5 games for Glebe. He played his last game in a round 8 loss to Newtown. He concluded his career with 2 tries and 9 goals in 17 appearances.
