= Glebe Dirty Reds =

Australian rugby league football club, based in Glebe, NSW

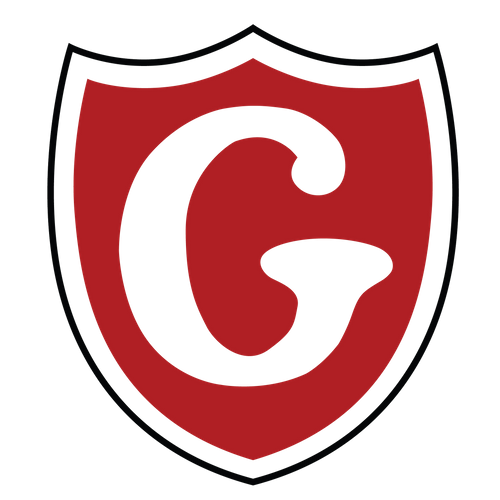

Club information
- Full name: Glebe District Rugby League Football Club
- Nickname: The Dirty Reds
- Short name: Glebe
- Founded: 9 January 1908; 118 years ago as Glebe
- Exited: 1929; 97 years ago
- Readmitted: 2017; 9 years ago

details
- Ground: Wentworth Park (20,000)
- Competition: NSWRFL (1908–1929); Ron Massey Cup (2017–present); Sydney Shield (2023–present)

Records
- Runners-up: 4 (1911, 1912, 1915, 1922)
- Minor premierships: 1 (1911)
- NSW Cup: 5 (1912, 1918, 1919, 1920, 1921)

The Glebe Dirty Reds are an Australian rugby league foundation club which played in the New South Wales Rugby Football League's Sydney premiership, the major competition for the sport in Sydney, from 1908 until their exit at the end of 1929. They were formed on 9 January 1908, with some sources suggesting that they may have been the first Sydney rugby league club to have been created. They were nicknamed and well known as the "Dirty Reds" due to the maroon colour of their playing jerseys.

Based in Glebe, New South Wales and playing most of their home matches out of the local Wentworth Oval, Glebe remained a highly competitive team for many years. Though they came close at times, the club was never able to secure a premiership title. After struggling towards the end of the 1920s the club was eventually voted out of the premiership. The club was revived in late 2015 and began to field teams in 2017 for the first time in 87 years. During their revival, they played their home games at Henson Park in Marrickville, sharing the ground with fellow foundation club, the Newtown Jets. In 2023, Glebe make their return to play home games permanently at Wentworth Oval for the first time since 1929.

== History ==
Chart of yearly table positions for Glebe Dirty Reds First Grade NSWRL

At the dawn of the 20th century, Glebe was a working-class suburb of Sydney, situated a few kilometres to the west of the city centre. The suburb had rugby union clubs during the 1880s-90s (Glebe FC, Toxteth FC, Glebe Rosedale and Glebe Electorate), but none reached any great prominence against the city's powerful membership-based clubs. The community rallied behind local identity Lewis Abrams who in 1900 successfully pushed for the dissolution of all of the city's existing clubs, replacing them with a district clubs scheme with players chosen on residential qualification only.

The Glebe District Rugby Union Club was created from this new scheme and was allocated boundaries per "Glebe. — The whole of the electorates of Glebe, Annandale, Pyrmont, Denison, and Phillip, Lang, and Gipps." The club adopted to the already established local sporting colour of maroon and was called "the Dirty Reds" by supporters. The club immediately made a big impact on the district competition, winning all three grades in the inaugural season before taking out another three first grade titles over the next seven years.

When the push for the formation of a new professional rugby league competition began, Glebe was one of the areas considered for the formation of a new breakaway team. The Glebe District Rugby League Football Club was formed as a result on 8 January 1908, possibly the first rugby league club to be formed in Australia. There was much support from both players and locals for the new team and this was considered an achievement in itself for the New South Wales Rugby League. As with the local rugby team (1900-14), the new rugby league club chose to play in maroon-coloured jerseys and the "Dirty Reds' moniker continued across.

The club began their premiership campaign with an 8–5 victory over Newcastle on 20 April 1908. Throughout the season they either remained close to or on top of the ladder and with one round remaining were on equal points with South Sydney and Eastern Suburbs to lead the competition. In the last regular-season match, Glebe went down 10–5 to sixth-placed Balmain and ended up running third overall, although the match ended up having no impact on who they would play in the finals a week later. In their semi final, Glebe went down 16–3 to minor premiers South Sydney and were knocked out of the competition.

In 1909, the club again lost their final regular-season match against Balmain 10–5 and ended up missing out on a possible finals berth by virtue of the loss. In 1910, the club had a mediocre season and had little chance of ever taking the premiership out. The 1911 season was arguably the most successful in the club's history, taking out the minor premiership outright by two points and winning 11 of their 14 matches on the way. They also secured their first-ever victory over local rivals Balmain, winning 41–2 in the second last regular-season match of the season. However, they came up against an Eastern Suburbs side led by Dally Messenger who had won six matches straight. In the final in which Glebe had a chance to take away the premiership, Eastern Suburbs won 22–9, forcing the first-ever Grand Final to be played since the minor premiers had a "right to challenge" if they were to lose the final. In a match where Glebe were leading almost all the way, Eastern Suburbs fought back and took the lead within the final ten minutes to 11–8, giving them the premiership.

Following Glebe's failure to convert their minor premiership into a premiership in 1911, the New South Wales Rugby Football League decided that no finals would be played from 1912 unless two teams were tied on equal points at the end of the season. In round four, Glebe faced Eastern Suburbs in front of a record crowd of 22,000 at the Royal Agricultural Society Grounds, going down 10–2. After 10 rounds, Glebe trailed Eastern Suburbs by just two points and were to face them the following week with four rounds to go. In a match in which Glebe almost certainly had to win to stay in premiership contention, Eastern Suburbs won a close match 6–4 in front of another record crowd of 25,000 at the Sydney Sports Ground and ended up taking away the premiership four points in front of Glebe at the end of the season.

1913 and 1914 proved to be mediocre seasons for Glebe and despite winning more games than they lost in each year, the club only managed to finish fourth and fifth respectively. In 1915, however, they came close to taking out the premiership. With four rounds remaining and equal with their local rivals, Glebe were to face the undefeated Balmain at the Sydney Sports Ground. Again, however, Glebe failed to win this crucial game, losing 12–2 in front of 20,000 people and allowed Balmain to take a one-match lead. With both teams winning their remaining games, Balmain ended up taking out the premiership. Overall in 1915, Glebe won 12 out of their 14 matches, a club best, losing twice to Balmain.

In 1917, Glebe was involved in a dispute with Annandale for fielding a player that did not reside in Glebe's district. As a result, former Newcastle player Dan Davies received a life ban from all rugby league. The entire Glebe 1st grade squad disagreed and went on strike. All Glebe 1st grade players were suspended. Three of the Burge brothers, including Frank Burge, were banned till the start of the 1919 season (an eighteen-month suspension), however many of these suspensions were subsequently overturned or shortened. Further implications came into the Newcastle Rugby League, where the competition was split until 1920.

Glebe finished out the decade continuing to win more games than they lost each season and regularly finished within the top four, but without a finals system in place they were unable to capitalise on this relatively strong position. In 1922, they finally gained another shot at the premiership when they and North Sydney finished on equal points at the end of the season. In the ensuing final, North Sydney easily accounted for Glebe 35–3, again denying Glebe the elusive premiership title.

From 1923 onwards, the club's form started to decline and for the first time since 1910, Glebe lost more games than they won. In 1926, they were given another shot at the premiership when the finals series was reinstated. Finishing second to runaway leaders South Sydney, Glebe were to face off against fourth-placed University for a place in the final. However, they lost this decisive match 29–3 and were sent out of the finals.

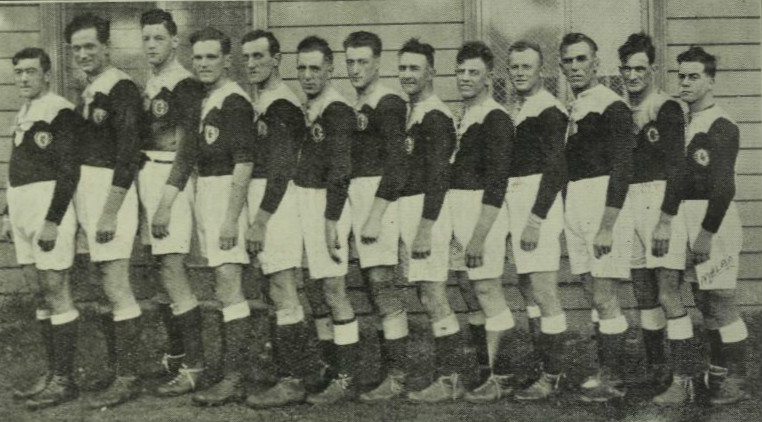
Glebe first grade team,1926

In their final three seasons, Glebe struggled at the bottom of the premiership after the departure of their long-time player Frank Burge. Out of nine teams they finished eighth in 1927, seventh in 1928 and eighth in 1929. At the end of the 1929 season at the insistence of South Sydney, the New South Wales Rugby Football League General Committee voted 13–12 to expel Glebe from the competition. One theory is that Balmain made a deal with South Sydney to remove Glebe as a means of consolidating both of their local territories. However, others suggest that the local area was changing in such a way that the club was probably on a road to its demise anyway. Glebe never played another match.

=== 2017 ===
After 87 years of non-existence, Glebe emerged from the ashes to play Rugby League again. Earlier in the year after a series of negotiations, The Concord-Burwood United side agreed to merge with Glebe to form the Concord-Burwood-Glebe Wolves. Part of the deal was that for a few games a year Glebe would wear the old jersey which has not been worn on the field since 1929. The main aim of the future was for Glebe to have their own stand alone team in the Ron Massey Cup and the Sydney Shield. One of the main people responsible for Glebe's rebirth was club spokesman Darren Flynn. The club would continue to play home matches at Goddard Park located in Concord, Sydney.

=== 2018 ===
On 5 January 2018, it was announced that Glebe would be returning to play preseason games at Wentworth Park which would be the first time that rugby league has been played there in 90 years. The matches also featured the Newtown Jets and the Blacktown Workers Sea Eagles.

For the 2018 Ron Massey Cup season, The Concord-Burwood-Glebe Wolves changed their name to the Glebe-Burwood Wolves.

On 11 February, Glebe played alongside fellow foundation club Newtown at Wentworth Park in two pre-season trial matches. It was the first time in 90 years that a professional game of rugby league had been played at the ground.

=== 2019 ===
On 17 February Glebe returned to Wentworth Park and played in a pre-season trial against North Sydney which finished with Glebe running out winners 24–12. This was the first time Glebe had played against North Sydney in 90 years with their last meeting being in 1929. At the end of the 2019 Ron Massey Cup season, Glebe finished in second last position on the table only 2 points above last placed Brothers Penrith.

=== 2020 ===
On 16 February, Glebe played in a pre-season trial match against fellow foundation side Newtown at Wentworth Park. It was the first time in 91 years that the two clubs had played against each other in a game. Newtown would run out comfortable 20–0 winners.

Due to the COVID-19 pandemic. The Ron Massey Cup and Sydney Shield competitions were cancelled along with the Canterbury Cup NSW. As a result, Glebe entered into the temporary Presidents Cup competition. Glebe would go on to reach the grand final against the Maitland Pickers but were defeated 17–16 at Bankwest Stadium.

=== 2021 ===
For the second year running, the Ron Massey Cup competition, along with all NSWRL competitions, were halted due to the COVID-19 Pandemic, and were subsequently, cancelled.

=== 2022 ===
In the 2022 Ron Massey Cup season, Glebe reached the grand final against Hills District but were defeated 18–12 at Kogarah Oval.

=== 2023 ===
In 2023, Glebe formed a partnership with the Sydney Roosters, ending a five-year partnership with Newtown. Glebe also introduced a Sydney Shield team, and will be playing all their home games from Wentworth Park in Glebe, alongside the Sydney Roosters Knock-On Effect NSW Cup and Jersey Flegg teams.

=== 2024 ===
On 14 September, Glebe won their first Ron Massey Cup title defeating Wentworthville 19–6 in the grand final which was played at Leichhardt Oval.

== Seasons ==
NOTE: P=Premiers, R=Runners-Ups, M=Minor Premierships, F=Finals Appearance, W=Wooden Spoons (Brackets Represent Finals Games)

| Competition | Games Played (FINALS) | Games Won (FINALS) | Games Drawn (FINALS) | Games Lost (FINALS) | Ladder Position | City Cup | P | R | M | F | W | Coach | Captain | Notes |
|---|---|---|---|---|---|---|---|---|---|---|---|---|---|---|
| 1908 NSWRFL season | 9(1) | 7 | 0 | 2(1) | 3/9 | – | | | | X | | – | Alex Burdon, Peter Moir | |
| 1909 NSWRFL season | 10 | 4 | 0 | 6 | 5/8 | – | | | | | | – | Alex Burdon | |
| 1910 NSWRFL season | 14 | 6 | 0 | 8 | 5/8 | – | | | | | | – | Alex Burdon | |
| 1911 NSWRFL season | 14(2) | 11 | 0 | 3(2) | 1/8 | – | | X | X | X | | – | Chris McKivat | Sign Frank Burge, Minor Premiers, Runners Up |
| 1912 NSWRFL season | 14 | 11 | 0 | 3 | 2/8 | Runners Up | | X | | | | – | Chris McKivat | Runners Up |
| 1913 NSWRFL season | 14 | 8 | 0 | 6 | 4/8 | Winners | | | | | | – | Chris McKivat | City Cup Winners |
| 1914 NSWRFL season | 14 | 7 | 1 | 6 | 5/8 | Semi Finals | | | | | | – | Chris McKivat | |
| 1915 NSWRFL season | 14 | 12 | 0 | 2 | 2/8 | Runners Up | | X | | | | – | Alex Bolewski | Runners Up |
| 1916 NSWRFL season | 14 | 10 | 1 | 3 | 3/8 | Runners Up | | | | | | – | Frank Burge | |
| 1917 NSWRFL season | 14 | 8 | 0 | 6 | 6/8 | Round 1 | | | | | | – | Tom Leggo | |
| 1918 NSWRFL season | 14 | 9 | 0 | 5 | 3/8 | Semi Finals | | | | | | – | Frank Burge | |
| 1919 NSWRFL season | 14 | 9 | 0 | 5 | 3/8 | Runners Up | | | | | | – | Frank Burge | |
| 1920 NSWRFL season | 13 | 8 | 0 | 5 | 2/9 | Round 1 | | | | | | – | Frank Burge | |
| 1921 NSWRFL season | 8 | 6 | 0 | 2 | 3/9 | Semi Finals | | | | | | – | Frank Burge | |
| 1922 NSWRFL season | 16(1) | 12 | 0 | 4(1) | 2/9 | Semi Finals | | X | | X | | – | Bill Benson | Runners Up |
| 1923 NSWRFL season | 16 | 6 | 0 | 10 | 6/9 | Runners Up | | | | | | – | Bill Benson | |
| 1924 NSWRFL season | 8 | 4 | 0 | 4 | 4/9 | Round 1 | | | | | | John Hickey | Bill Benson | |
| 1925 NSWRFL season | 12 | 5 | 0 | 7 | 6/9 | Runners Up | | | | | | – | Tom McGrath | |
| 1926 NSWRFL season | 16(1) | 9 | 1 | 6(1) | 2/9 | – | | | | X | | – | Tom McGrath | |
| 1927 NSWRFL season | 16 | 4 | 0 | 12 | 8/9 | – | | | | | | – | Tom McGrath, Jack McMahon | |
| 1928 NSWRFL season | 12 | 4 | 0 | 8 | 7/9 | – | | | | | | – | Jack Toohey | |
| 1929 NSWRFL season | 16 | 3 | 3 | 10 | 8/9 | – | | | | | | – | Jack McMahon | |

== Statistics and records ==
As an individual, Frank Burge holds all of Glebe's records. His eight try tally in a match against University on 19 June 1920 is not only a club record, but also the standing Australian premiership record for most tries in a game. It was in that same game that he managed to claim the club record for most points in a game, kicking four goals in addition to his eight tries for a total of 32 points. A month earlier he scored eight goals in a match against Annandale, a club record later equalled by Jack Hickey in 1927.

In 1918, Frank Burge scored a club-record 24 tries in a season and in 1920, broke the club record for most points in a season with 110. Overall, he scored 137 tries and 49 goals for the club in a career spanning 16 seasons and 138 games, which were also club records. As a forward, his record tally of 146 tries (including nine later scored with St. George in 1927) remained unbroken until Steve Menzies managed to do so in 2004, almost 80 seasons after Burge had retired.

The team's biggest victory was a 59–3 victory over North Sydney at Wentworth Oval on 17 July 1915. Its biggest ever loss was against Eastern Suburbs when they went down 36–0. Overall, Glebe are also statistically one of the most successful clubs to have played in the premiership. Out of the 33 teams who have made an appearance over the years, Glebe has the fifth-best winning percentage. From 297 games played, 163 were won, six drawn and 128 lost for a winning percentage of 55.89%.

== Past players ==
=== NSWRFL (1908–1929) ===
| Name | First Yr | Last Yr | Apps | Tries | Goals | FG | Pts |
|---|---|---|---|---|---|---|---|
| Leo Abberton | 1925 | 1925 | 1 | - | - | - | - |
| George Algie | 1929 | 1929 | 3 | - | - | - | - |
| Roy Algie | 1910 | 1914 | 55 | 24 | 28 | 3 | 134 |
| John Alleyne | 1929 | 1929 | 3 | - | - | - | - |
| Henry Andrews | 1926 | 1926 | 1 | - | - | - | - |
| Harold Angus | 1916 | 1919 | 15 | - | - | - | - |
| S. Atkinson | 1929 | 1929 | 1 | - | - | - | - |
| George Bain | 1921 | 1921 | 7 | 1 | - | - | 3 |
| Jack Bartley | 1914 | 1914 | 11 | - | - | - | - |
| Leslie Bateman | 1909 | 1909 | 1 | - | - | - | - |
| J. Beckett | 1927 | 1927 | 1 | - | - | - | - |
| Bill Benson | 1916 | 1924 | 94 | 19 | - | - | 57 |
| Alby Black | 1928 | 1929 | 18 | 3 | - | - | 9 |
| William Black | 1928 | 1929 | 21 | 1 | - | - | 3 |
| Alex Bolewski | 1914 | 1919 | 53 | 7 | 96 | - | 213 |
| Henry Bolewski | 1912 | 1921 | 41 | 8 | 26 | - | 76 |
| Harry Brighton | 1911 | 1912 | 30 | - | - | - | - |
| Dave Brolly | 1917 | 1920 | 39 | 7 | - | - | 21 |
| Eddie Brolly | 1917 | 1917 | 1 | - | - | - | - |
| Jack Brolly | 1923 | 1923 | 1 | - | - | - | - |
| Michael Brown | 1914 | 1914 | 1 | - | - | - | - |
| Anthony Burden | 1927 | 1929 | 7 | 2 | - | - | 6 |
| Alex Burdon | 1908 | 1910 | 19 | 6 | - | - | 18 |
| Dick Burdon | 1908 | 1909 | 4 | - | - | - | - |
| Albert Burge | 1911 | 1919 | 59 | 10 | 88 | - | 206 |
| Frank Burge | 1911 | 1926 | 138 | 139 | 49 | - | 515 |
| Laidley Burge | 1916 | 1922 | 64 | 9 | 11 | - | 49 |
| Peter Burge | 1911 | 1914 | 15 | 1 | - | - | 3 |
| S. Burton | 1927 | 1927 | 4 | - | - | - | - |
| Arthur Butler | 1916 | 1917 | 21 | 1 | - | - | 3 |
| M. Callanan | 1918 | 1918 | 1 | - | - | - | - |
| George Carruthers | 1910 | 1910 | 2 | - | - | - | - |
| Syd Christensen | 1928 | 1929 | 8 | 3 | 8 | - | 25 |
| W. Christie | 1927 | 1927 | 11 | 1 | - | - | 3 |
| John Cleary | 1910 | 1910 | 1 | 1 | - | - | 3 |
| William Cockburn | 1923 | 1924 | 5 | 3 | - | - | 9 |
| Ed Colbrain | 1927 | 1929 | 25 | 6 | - | - | 18 |
| Patrick Coll | 1921 | 1925 | 27 | 2 | - | - | 6 |
| Denis Comerford | 1916 | 1917 | 3 | - | - | - | - |
| Conlon | 1917 | 1917 | 1 | - | - | - | - |
| Albert Conlon | 1908 | 1910 | 10 | 2 | 17 | 1 | 42 |
| E. Cox | 1923 | 1927 | 7 | - | - | - | - |
| Charles Cubitt | 1911 | 1912 | 21 | 3 | 1 | - | 11 |
| Les Cubitt | 1911 | 1911 | 16 | 9 | 4 | 1 | 37 |
| Eddie Cummins | 1923 | 1926 | 44 | 1 | 5 | - | 13 |
| J. Cusack | 1910 | 1910 | 1 | - | - | - | - |
| Billy Dalton | 1914 | 1914 | 1 | - | - | - | - |
| J. Darley | 1927 | 1927 | 2 | - | - | - | - |
| Joe Davidson | 1910 | 1910 | 6 | 2 | - | - | 6 |
| Dan Davies | 1917 | 1917 | 1 | 1 | 1 | - | 5 |
| Herbert Davies | 1909 | 1909 | 1 | - | - | - | - |
| Charles Davis | 1908 | 1910 | 10 | 1 | - | - | 3 |
| Jim Davis | 1913 | 1913 | 12 | 1 | 3 | - | 9 |
| Jim Deeley | 1929 | 1929 | 9 | 2 | - | - | 6 |
| Max Doerner | 1915 | 1916 | 19 | 1 | 1 | - | 5 |
| Billy Doyle | 1927 | 1927 | 10 | 2 | - | - | 6 |
| T. Dwyer | 1917 | 1917 | 1 | - | - | - | - |
| Lloyd Edwards | 1908 | 1908 | 9 | 1 | - | - | 3 |
| George Eves | 1921 | 1921 | 1 | - | - | - | - |
| Mal Fallon | 1929 | 1929 | 1 | - | - | - | - |
| Jim Farrelly | 1909 | 1912 | 16 | - | - | - | - |
| Tom Faunce | 1910 | 1910 | 2 | - | 3 | - | 6 |
| L. Ferrow | 1928 | 1928 | 1 | - | - | - | - |
| John Flahey | 1909 | 1910 | 2 | - | - | - | - |
| J. Flanagan | 1914 | 1917 | 3 | - | - | - | - |
| Billy Fullham | 1927 | 1927 | 5 | 2 | - | - | 6 |
| Eddie Gallagher | 1916 | 1919 | 31 | 3 | 1 | - | 11 |
| Dave Garlick | 1911 | 1914 | 38 | 20 | - | - | 60 |
| C. Geelan | 1924 | 1924 | 1 | - | - | - | - |
| Arthur George | 1909 | 1909 | 1 | - | - | - | - |
| Tom Gleeson | 1911 | 1923 | 29 | 17 | - | - | 51 |
| Ned Goddard | 1923 | 1929 | 82 | 29 | - | - | 87 |
| Bill Gough | 1928 | 1928 | 2 | - | - | - | - |
| Arthur Gray | 1917 | 1927 | 58 | 12 | 15 | - | 66 |
| Bert Gray | 1912 | 1926 | 102 | 33 | 1 | - | 101 |
| Frank Gray | 1926 | 1927 | 13 | 4 | - | - | 12 |
| Sam Griffiths | 1910 | 1913 | 40 | - | - | - | - |
| Walter Haddock | 1921 | 1923 | 34 | 2 | - | - | 6 |
| Arthur Halloway | 1908 | 1908 | 8 | 3 | - | - | 9 |
| J. Hansen | 1924 | 1924 | 1 | - | - | - | - |
| Bill Hardcastle | 1909 | 1910 | 13 | 6 | 1 | - | 20 |
| Vic Harris | 1908 | 1909 | 12 | 4 | - | - | 12 |
| T. Harrison | 1926 | 1929 | 41 | 5 | - | - | 15 |
| Charlie Hedley | 1908 | 1908 | 6 | - | - | - | - |
| William Hendry | 1908 | 1908 | 1 | - | - | - | - |
| Clarrie Hickey | 1927 | 1927 | 10 | - | 18 | - | 36 |
| Dave Hickey | 1928 | 1929 | 20 | - | 11 | - | 22 |
| F. Hickey | 1927 | 1927 | 2 | - | - | - | - |
| Jack Hickey | 1925 | 1929 | 53 | 7 | 40 | - | 101 |
| J. "Jack" Hickey | 1910 | 1915 | 55 | 14 | 29 | - | 100 |
| Tom Holder | 1925 | 1926 | 22 | 2 | 1 | - | 8 |
| Dick Hyland | 1910 | 1910 | 1 | - | - | - | - |
| Edward Ireland | 1923 | 1923 | 1 | - | - | - | - |
| Bill Ives | 1920 | 1920 | 11 | 3 | - | - | 9 |
| C. Jacques | 1925 | 1925 | 2 | - | - | - | - |
| Tommy James | 1920 | 1928 | 66 | 17 | - | - | 51 |
| N. Johnson | 1919 | 1919 | 1 | - | - | - | - |
| A. Johnston | 1929 | 1929 | 16 | 2 | - | - | 6 |
| Alec Johnston | 1916 | 1921 | 29 | 3 | - | - | 9 |
| A. Jones | 1909 | 1910 | 6 | - | - | - | - |
| Wally Jones | 1928 | 1929 | 11 | - | - | - | - |
| Jenkin Joseph | 1929 | 1929 | 15 | 7 | - | - | 21 |
| Jim Keating | 1913 | 1913 | 2 | - | - | - | - |
| Bill Kelleway | 1926 | 1928 | 23 | 3 | - | - | 9 |
| Dan Kelly | 1911 | 1915 | 43 | 3 | - | - | 9 |
| P. Kelly | 1928 | 1928 | 3 | - | 1 | - | 2 |
| Stan King | 1923 | 1923 | 6 | - | - | - | - |
| Jack Knight | 1914 | 1920 | 56 | - | - | - | - |
| Frank Ladner | 1910 | 1910 | 4 | 1 | - | - | 3 |
| W. Larken | 1925 | 1925 | 2 | - | - | - | - |
| E. Larter | 1929 | 1929 | 11 | 1 | - | - | 3 |
| Tom Leggo | 1913 | 1919 | 87 | 41 | 18 | - | 159 |
| J. Lennon | 1909 | 1909 | 1 | - | - | - | - |
| T. Lewins | 1920 | 1920 | 4 | - | - | - | - |
| Roy Liston | 1923 | 1923 | 14 | 1 | 2 | - | 7 |
| Billy Lloyd | 1926 | 1929 | 29 | 9 | - | - | 27 |
| Jack Lodge | 1923 | 1924 | 16 | 4 | - | - | 12 |
| Horrie Logan | 1912 | 1912 | 10 | 2 | - | - | 6 |
| Bill Lucas | 1923 | 1925 | 29 | - | - | - | - |
| B. Lupton | 1927 | 1927 | 3 | - | - | - | - |
| Stephen Lynch | 1908 | 1910 | 16 | 1 | - | - | 3 |
| Tom McCabe | 1908 | 1908 | 9 | 3 | - | - | 9 |
| John McGovern | 1909 | 1910 | 2 | 2 | - | - | 6 |
| Maurice McGrane | 1917 | 1917 | 1 | - | - | - | - |
| J. McGrath | 1917 | 1917 | 1 | - | - | - | - |
| Tom McGrath | 1917 | 1927 | 79 | 13 | - | - | 39 |
| Dugald McGregor | 1912 | 1914 | 37 | 2 | 7 | - | 20 |
| Ted McGuinness | 1912 | 1912 | 1 | - | - | - | - |
| Chris McKivat | 1910 | 1914 | 54 | 5 | - | - | 15 |
| J. McMahon | 1926 | 1929 | 45 | 2 | 1 | - | 8 |
| Jack McMahon | 1923 | 1929 | 62 | 15 | - | - | 45 |
| Ewart McMillan | 1923 | 1923 | 7 | - | - | - | - |
| Alexander McPherson | 1921 | 1921 | 2 | - | 2 | - | 4 |
| Tom Maher | 1911 | 1911 | 6 | - | 5 | - | 10 |
| Alex Main | 1923 | 1923 | 1 | - | - | - | - |
| Oscar Manwaring | 1910 | 1910 | 4 | - | - | - | - |
| S. Martin | 1929 | 1929 | 8 | 2 | - | - | 6 |
| Lionel Matchett | 1929 | 1929 | 11 | - | - | - | - |
| William May | 1913 | 1917 | 5 | 1 | - | - | 3 |
| William Meadows | 1925 | 1925 | 7 | 1 | - | - | 3 |
| Bill Melville | 1926 | 1927 | 26 | 4 | - | - | 12 |
| Jim Moir | 1908 | 1908 | 1 | - | - | - | - |
| Peter Moir | 1908 | 1909 | 10 | 3 | 1 | - | 11 |
| Peter Moko | 1909 | 1909 | 2 | 1 | 1 | - | 5 |
| Dick Moroney | 1909 | 1910 | 23 | 8 | 9 | - | 42 |
| John Moroney | 1908 | 1910 | 15 | 1 | - | - | 3 |
| Mick Muggivan | 1910 | 1912 | 21 | 13 | - | - | 39 |
| F. Murphy | 1927 | 1927 | 2 | - | - | - | - |
| Joe Murphy | 1922 | 1923 | 14 | 1 | - | 1 | 5 |
| William Neill | 1914 | 1914 | 2 | - | - | - | - |
| Fred Nelson | 1912 | 1912 | 1 | - | - | - | - |
| Fred Noakes | 1927 | 1928 | 8 | 1 | - | - | 3 |
| Roy Norman | 1913 | 1914 | 17 | 11 | - | - | 33 |
| George Norris | 1909 | 1909 | 2 | - | - | - | - |
| Claud O'Donnell | 1915 | 1917 | 39 | - | 1 | - | 2 |
| Wally Ogaard | 1908 | 1909 | 13 | 2 | - | - | 6 |
| Charlie Ogle | 1917 | 1922 | 57 | 40 | 3 | - | 126 |
| Edward O'Keefe | 1908 | 1910 | 10 | 1 | 2 | - | 7 |
| Sid Palmer | 1929 | 1929 | 5 | 1 | 4 | - | 11 |
| J. Parkinson | 1927 | 1928 | 5 | - | - | - | - |
| Arthur Pearce | 1908 | 1908 | 7 | 1 | - | - | 3 |
| H. Pearce | 1909 | 1909 | 1 | - | - | - | - |
| Harry Pendergast | 1908 | 1909 | 18 | 1 | - | - | 3 |
| Sid Pert | 1908 | 1919 | 115 | 28 | - | - | 84 |
| Henry Pidcock | 1923 | 1924 | 2 | - | - | - | - |
| Fred Prendergast | 1908 | 1908 | 2 | - | - | - | - |
| Prince | 1915 | 1915 | 1 | - | - | - | - |
| Norm Proctor | 1916 | 1921 | 66 | 4 | 1 | - | 14 |
| J. Pye | 1919 | 1919 | 12 | - | - | - | - |
| Frank Quigley | 1923 | 1925 | 14 | - | 14 | - | 28 |
| George Quigley | 1917 | 1917 | 2 | - | - | - | - |
| Sam Quigley | 1919 | 1924 | 19 | 2 | 34 | - | 74 |
| Tony Redmond | 1911 | 1923 | 67 | 11 | 45 | - | 123 |
| Phil Regan | 1911 | 1922 | 59 | 7 | 1 | - | 23 |
| N. Reid | 1908 | 1908 | 5 | - | - | - | - |
| George Reynolds | 1918 | 1919 | 14 | 3 | - | - | 9 |
| W. Reynolds | 1919 | 1919 | 3 | - | - | - | - |
| Charlie Ricketts | 1922 | 1928 | 37 | 3 | 7 | - | 23 |
| W. Rochford | 1917 | 1917 | 2 | - | - | - | - |
| John Ryan | 1908 | 1909 | 17 | 1 | - | - | 3 |
| R. Ryan | 1909 | 1909 | 2 | - | - | - | - |
| Fred Saunders | 1913 | 1915 | 16 | - | 2 | - | 4 |
| John Scannell | 1914 | 1914 | 1 | - | - | - | - |
| Mick Scannell | 1914 | 1920 | 76 | 19 | 2 | - | 61 |
| W. Seccombe | 1927 | 1927 | 5 | 1 | - | - | 3 |
| Andy See | 1925 | 1925 | 12 | 4 | - | - | 12 |
| Bill Shankland | 1927 | 1928 | 13 | 2 | 6 | - | 18 |
| Austin Sherry | 1923 | 1927 | 17 | 2 | 9 | - | 24 |
| E. Smith | 1917 | 1917 | 2 | - | - | - | - |
| Frank Smith | 1925 | 1928 | 22 | 2 | - | - | 6 |
| W. Smith | 1908 | 1909 | 2 | - | - | - | - |
| Billy Splatt | 1917 | 1921 | 4 | - | - | - | - |
| Charles Splatt | 1910 | 1910 | 3 | - | 1 | - | 2 |
| Ron Stapleton | 1918 | 1922 | 19 | 2 | - | - | 6 |
| A. Stewart | 1909 | 1909 | 3 | - | - | - | - |
| Billy Stirton | 1919 | 1923 | 12 | 1 | - | - | 3 |
| Charles Stuart | 1922 | 1925 | 17 | 1 | - | - | 3 |
| Mick Sullivan | 1908 | 1910 | 14 | - | - | - | - |
| Ed Summers | 1914 | 1923 | 46 | 10 | - | - | 30 |
| Ted Swinson | 1908 | 1920 | 108 | 6 | - | - | 18 |
| Bill Telford | 1928 | 1928 | 6 | 1 | - | - | 3 |
| Fritz Thiering | 1911 | 1920 | 29 | 7 | 18 | - | 57 |
| Alfie Thompson | 1923 | 1929 | 34 | 10 | - | - | 30 |
| Cecil Thompson | 1919 | 1919 | 1 | - | - | - | - |
| Hash Thompson | 1919 | 1920 | 2 | 1 | - | - | 3 |
| Jack Toohey | 1917 | 1928 | 69 | 31 | 42 | - | 177 |
| Jack Tracey | 1927 | 1927 | 7 | 1 | - | - | 3 |
| James Travers | 1910 | 1910 | 1 | - | - | - | - |
| Billy Trewin | 1912 | 1912 | 1 | - | - | - | - |
| Augustus Veness | 1908 | 1908 | 5 | 1 | - | - | 3 |
| H. Watling | 1927 | 1927 | 1 | - | - | - | - |
| Vic Webber | 1926 | 1926 | 1 | - | - | - | - |
| Arthur Weymark | 1908 | 1908 | 1 | - | - | - | - |
| Eddie White | 1911 | 1911 | 1 | - | - | - | - |
| Austin Williams | 1910 | 1910 | 1 | - | - | - | - |
| R. Williams | 1908 | 1908 | 1 | 1 | - | - | 3 |
| Albert Wright | 1908 | 1918 | 51 | 8 | 4 | - | 32 |
| Bill Young | 1923 | 1926 | 20 | 3 | - | - | 9 |

=== Greatest players ===
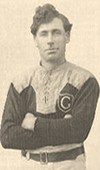
Chris McKivat

During their 22-year presence in the New South Wales Rugby Football League premiership, the club managed to produce 12 internationals. Those twelve players were Alex Burdon, Frank Burge, who was probably the best player they ever had, Peter Burge, Albert Conlon, Bert Gray, Arthur Halloway, Charlie Hedley, Harold Angus, Tom Gleeson, Jack Hickey, Tom McCabe, Chris McKivat, Peter Moir and Les Cubitt. A third Burge brother, former Wallaby tourist Albert Burge was also a Dirty Red. Alex Burdon and Chris McKivat had the honour of captaining their country, from 1908 to 1909 and 1911–12 respectively and Les Cubitt captained an Australasian side in 1921.

In 2008, to celebrate the Centenary of Rugby League in Australia, a panel commissioned by the Australian Rugby League and National Rugby League voted four Glebe players into a group of "Rugby League's 100 Greatest Players". These players were Frank Burge, Les Cubitt, Arthur Halloway, and Chris McKivat.

The side that played in the 1911 New South Wales Rugby Football League Grand Final is shown below.

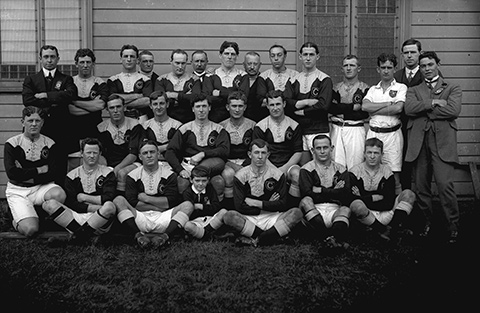
Glebe RLC 1911 McKivat (centre with ball), flanked by R Algie left F Burge right

No.

Position
Player

1 Roy Algie – FB 2 Mick Muggivan – WG 3 Dave Garlick – CE 4 Tom Gleeson – CE 5 Charlie Cubitt – WG 6 Les Cubitt – FE 7 Fritz Thiering – HB

No.

Position
Player

8 Sid Pert – PR 9 Tony Redmond – HK 10 Sam Griffiths – PR 11 Albert Burge – SR (c) 12 Frank Burge – SR 13 Harry Brighton – LK 14 J Farrelly – positions

The side that played in the 1922 New South Wales Rugby Football League Grand Final is shown below.

No.

Position
Player

1 R Stapleton – FB 2 Charlie Ogle – WG 3 Ed Summers – CE 4 Tommy James – CE 5 Jack Toohey – WG 6 William Stirton – FE 7 Bill Benson – HB (c)

No.

Position
Player

8 Frank Burge – PR 9 Bert Gray – HK 10 Laidley Burge – PR 11 Tony Redmond – SR 12 Walter Haddock – SR 13 Tom McGrath – LK

== Notable supporters ==
- Billy Hughes, former Prime Minister of Australia

== Honours ==
- New South Wales Rugby Football League First Grade runners-up: 4

1911, 1912, 1915, 1922

- New South Wales Rugby Football League minor premierships: 1

1911

- City Cup: 1

1913

- City Cup runners-up: 6

1912, 1915, 1916, 1919, 1923, 1925

- Reserve Grade: 5

1912, 1918, 1919, 1920, 1921

- Third Grade: 1

1927

- Ron Massey Cup: 1

2024

- NSW Challenge Cup: 1

2020

== Footnotes ==
- Fagan, Sean (2005). The Rugby Rebellion – The Divide of League and Union. ISBN 978-0-9875002-7-4
