= Tommy James (rugby union) =

- Full name: Thomas Owen James
- Born: 6 October 1904 Aberavon, Wales
- Died: 8 April 1984 (aged 79) Port Talbot, Wales

Rugby union career
- Position: Fullback
International career
| Years | Team | Apps | (Points) |
| 1935–37 | Wales | 2 | (3) |

Thomas Owen James (6 October 1904 – 8 April 1984) was a Welsh international rugby union player.

James was a younger brother of Wales winger Will James.

A goal–kicking fullback, James was a product of the Aberavon juniors. He made his first XV debut with Aberavon in 1927 and was capped twice for Wales, debuting against Ireland at Belfast in 1935. His other cap came two years later in Swansea when turned out against Scotland. He continued playing with Aberavon after the war despite being into his 40s.

== See also ==
- List of Wales national rugby union players
