= Tommy James (rugby league) =

Australian rugby league footballer

Personal information
- Full name: Thomas Leslie James
- Born: 1899; Glebe, New South Wales, Australia
- Died: 20 July 1967 (aged 67–68)

Playing information
- Position: Wing, Centre
Club
Years	Team	Pld	T	G	FG	P
1920–28	Glebe	70	17	0	0	51

Tommy James was an Australian rugby league footballer who played in the 1920s. He played for Glebe in the New South Wales Rugby League (NSWRL) competition.

== Playing career ==
James made his first grade debut for Glebe against local rivals Annandale in Round 1 1920 at Birchgrove Oval which ended in a 43-0 victory with James scoring 2 tries in the rout.

That season, Glebe would finish as runners up in the competition behind their other local rival Balmain. In 1922, James made 16 appearances for the club as they finished second on the table again behind North Sydney. Glebe had finished on equal points with Norths and therefore a grand final was needed to be played to determine the premiership winner.

James played in the centres for Glebe in the 1922 NSWRL grand final which was played at the Sydney Cricket Ground in front of 15,000 spectators. Although both sides finished on equal points, North Sydney outclassed Glebe in the final by a score of 35-3.

Following the grand final defeat, Glebe went through a period of decline were not able to replicate their form of the 1922 season. James played with Glebe until the end of the 1928 season a year before the club was controversially voted out of the premiership at the conclusion of the 1929 season.
