= Max Doerner (rugby league) =

Australian rugby league footballer

Max Sebastian Doerner (1889–1967) was an early rugby league footballer in the New South Wales Rugby League competition in the 1910s.

Max Doerner played with Glebe for two seasons between 1915-1916 and Eastern Suburbs in the 1917 season. He is listed on the Sydney Roosters Players register as player No.91.

He died on 3 May 1967.
