= Charlie Ogle =

Australian rugby league footballer

Personal information
- Full name: Charles Ogle
- Born: 1893; Tamworth, New South Wales, Australia
- Died: 22 February 1959 (aged 65–66); Leichhardt, New South Wales, Australia

Playing information
- Position: Wing
Club
Years	Team	Pld	T	G	FG	P
1917–22	Glebe	70	55	4	0	173
Representative
Years	Team	Pld	T	G	FG	P
1919	New South Wales	1	0	0	0	0
1922	Metropolis	1	2	0	0	6

Charles Ogle (1893-1959) was an Australian rugby league footballer who played in the 1910s and 1920s.

== Playing career ==
Ogle played for Glebe for five seasons between 1917 and 1922. Ogle played wing in the 1922 Grand Final against North Sydney which Glebe lost 35–3 at the Sydney Cricket Ground. He represented New South Wales on one occasion in 1919. Ogle took up a player-coach role with Manilla in 1923, with the town's team competing against Tamworth teams.

== Death ==
He died at his Leichhardt, New South Wales home on 22 February 1959, aged 65.
