= Tom Leggo =

Australian rugby league footballer

Personal information
- Full name: Thomas Tregear Leggo
- Born: 8 August 1892 Sydney, New South Wales, Australia
- Died: 10 June 1958 (aged 65) Balgowlah, New South Wales

Playing information
- Position: Wing
Club
Years	Team	Pld	T	G	FG	P
1912	Newtown	3	1	0	0	3
1913–19	Glebe	94	25	4	0	83
	Total	97	26	4	0	86
Representative
Years	Team	Pld	T	G	FG	P
1913–19	New South Wales	5	2	2	0	10

Thomas Tregear Leggo (1892 – 10 June 1958) was an Australian pioneer rugby league player who played in the 1910s.

== Background ==
Leggo was born at Sydney in 1892. Leggo grew up in Glebe, Sydney.

== Playing career ==
Leggo's playing career started at Newtown in 1912. He swifted to his local team, the Glebe rugby league team in 1913 and played seven seasons with the club between 1913 and 1919. He represented Sydney(Metropolis) in 1913–1914 and represented New South Wales on five occasions between 1913 and 1914, which included a tour of New Zealand.

Leggo died on 10 June 1958, at Balgowlah, New South Wales aged 66.
