= Frank Burge =

Australia international rugby league footballer & coach

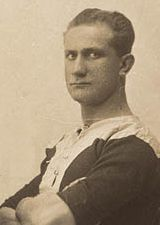
- Frank Burge circa 1914

Personal information
- Born: 14 August 1894 Darlington, New South Wales, Australia
- Died: 5 July 1958 (aged 63) Marrickville, New South Wales, Australia

Playing information
- Height: 183 cm (6 ft 0 in)
- Weight: 93 kg (14 st 9 lb)
- Position: Lock, Second-row, Prop
Club
Years	Team	Pld	T	G	FG	P
1911–26	Glebe	149	137	50	0	511
1927	St. George	18	9	0	0	27
	Total	167	146	50	0	538
Representative
Years	Team	Pld	T	G	FG	P
1912–26	New South Wales	26	32	32	0	160
1914–22	Australia	13	7	7	0	35
1911–22	Metropolis	8	16	3	0	54

Coaching information
Club
Years	Team	Gms	W	D	L	W%
1927–30	St George	66	44	3	19	67
1932	Eastern Suburbs	15	9	0	6	60
1935	North Sydney	17	10	1	6	59
1936	Canterbury-Bankstown	15	9	2	4	60
1937	St George	0	0	0	0
1940	Newtown	15	9	0	6	60
1945	North Sydney	15	8	0	7	53
1947	Western Suburbs	20	12	0	8	60
	Total	163	101	6	56	62
- Relatives: Albert Burge (brother); Laidley Burge (brother); Peter Burge (brother)

Frank Burge (14 August 1894 – 5 July 1958) was an Australian rugby league footballer. He was one of the greatest forwards in the history of rugby league in Australia, and later became one of the game's finest coaches. His club career was with Glebe and the St. George Dragons. He represented New South Wales on twenty-six occasions and played thirteen test matches for the Australia and played for the Kangaroos in a further twenty-three tour matches.

== Early years ==
Born on 14 August 1894 in Darlington, New South Wales, Burge was playing first grade rugby union at age 14, the youngest ever to play senior rugby in either code.

== Professional playing career ==
=== Glebe ===
Upon switching to the professional New South Wales Rugby Football League, Burge was playing first grade for Glebe at age 16 and was selected for the state at age 18. After his attempt to enlist in the Australian Imperial Force was rejected because of a speech impediment, Burge devoted his energies to rugby league. At 93 kilograms or 14 stone 9 pounds and equally effective anywhere in the forwards from lock to prop, he had the speed of a back to complement his strength and an anticipation that made him a support player without peer. Burge was a teetotaller who was way ahead of his time in observing a strict diet, he used coaching concepts familiar in modern sports psychology and upheld an all-year training regime that continued right through the long Sydney summer off-season. He debuted for Australia in the domestic 1914 Ashes series against Great Britain appearing in all three Tests. He is listed on the Australian Players Register as Kangaroo No. 88. Burge was the New South Wales Rugby Football League's top try-scorer in 1915, 1916 and 1918 an extremely rare feat in even one year for a forward.

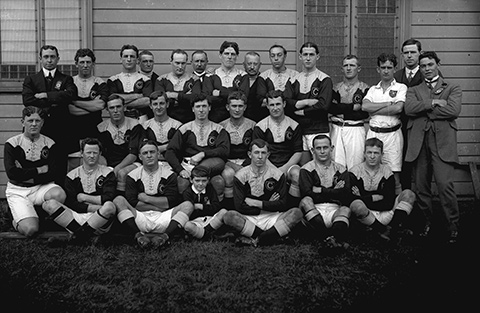
Glebe RLFC 1911 Veteran captain McKivat centre with ball, 17 year old Burge to his left

On the 1919 tour of New Zealand Burge played in all four tests. In the 1920 season, he was the league's top point scorer. Burge holds the NSWRFL/NSWRL/ARL/NRL record for most tries in a match, scoring eight in a club match for Glebe in 1920. Again in 1920 he appeared in all three Tests of the domestic Ashes series and then was selected on the 1921–22 Kangaroo tour of Great Britain where he played in all three tests and twenty tour matches scoring 33 tries in 23 matches, more than any touring forward before or since. Burge's representative record shows him appearing in every single Australia Test match played in the war-interrupted eight-year period between 1914 and 1922. He played 16 seasons and a record 148 first grade games for Glebe and was club captain for many years. His career tally of 146 first grade tries stood for eighty years as the highest by a forward until Manly-Warringah back rower Steven Menzies broke it in 2004.

Burge standing left with the 1921-22 Kangaroos

=== St. George ===
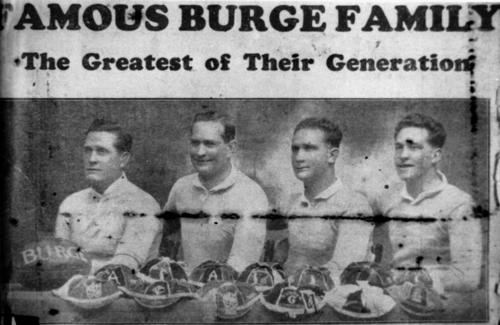
The Burge brothers

Burge back row third from right, coach of Saints' 1930 team.

Burge moved to St. George in 1927, retired as a player at the end of that season, and coached the club for a further three seasons. He maintained an average of a try a game for seventeen seasons, scoring 218 tries in 213 senior matches with 146 coming from his 154 Sydney first grade matches. That try-scoring tally today stands at eleventh on an all-time list dominated by backs.

== Coaching career ==
Burge's first coaching job was with St. George between 1927 and 1930. Burge coached the club to the 1927 and 1930 grand finals where St. George were defeated on both occasions. Burge's next two coaching jobs saw him take Eastern Suburbs and North Sydney to the preliminary finals respectively. In 1936, he coached Canterbury-Bankstown to their first finals series. He had similar success with Newtown in 1940 taking them to the finals after a second-placed finish. He returned to North Sydney in 1945 and once more guided them to the finals. In his final coaching role, Burge took Western Suburbs to the preliminary final in 1947. Following this match, Burge retired from coaching. He had a unique coaching career as he never once missed the finals with any team he was in charge of.

== Retirement and death ==
Burge was awarded life membership of the New South Wales Rugby League in 1935.

On 5 July 1958, after watching a Newtown versus North Sydney match at Henson Park, Burge died suddenly after suffering a heart attack, 41 days short of his 64th birthday. A large funeral was held on 8 July at the Woronora Crematorium. He was survived by his wife Millie. Burge's former University rival Dick O'Brien said on Burge's death: 'May I say, as Anthony did of Caesar: his life was gentle, the elements so mixed in him that nature might stand up and say to all the world "This was a man"'. Tom Goodwin, Sun Herald sports journalist, said of Burge: "I believe Frank Burge was the greatest forward the game has ever produced. Indeed, he may have been the greatest league player ever."

== Recognition ==
In 2004 he was admitted into the Australian Rugby League Hall of Fame.

In February 2008, Burge was named in the list of Australia's 100 Greatest Players (1908–2007) which was commissioned by the NRL and ARL to celebrate the code's centenary year in Australia. Burge was named as an interchange player in Australian rugby league's Team of the Century. Announced on 17 April 2008, the team is the panel's majority choice for each of the thirteen starting positions and four interchange players.

In 2008 New South Wales announced their rugby league team of the century, naming Burge at prop.

Joining fellow pre-WWII greats Dave Brown and Dally Messenger, Burge was inducted as a rugby league Immortal in 2018, along with recent greats Norm Provan and Mal Meninga. Uniquely, Burge is the only Immortal who has not won a NRL, NSWRL or BRL Premiership. On 20 July 2022, Burge was named in the St. George Dragons District Rugby League Clubs team of the century as head coach.

== Sources ==
- Andrews, Malcolm (2006) The ABC of Rugby League, Austn Broadcasting Corpn, Sydney
- Whiticker, Alan (2004) Captaining the Kangaroos, New Holland, Sydney
- Whiticker, Alan & Hudson, Glen (2006) The Encyclopedia of Rugby League Players, Gavin Allen Publishing, Sydney
- Whiticker, Alan & Collis, Ian (2006) The History of Rugby League Clubs, New Holland, Sydney
- Heads, Ian & Middleton, David (2008) A Centenary of Rugby League, MacMillan, Sydney.
- Howell, Max (2005) Born to Lead: Wallaby Test Captains, Celebrity Books, Auckland, NZ.
