= List of South Sydney Rabbitohs players =

Following are lists of all rugby league footballers who have played first-grade for the South Sydney Rabbitohs Rugby League Football Club.

== Players and statistics ==
Correct as of round 15 of the 2024 NRL season

Club								Representative	
No.	Name	Career	Appearances	Tries	Goals	FGs	Points	Country	State
1	Tommy Anderson	1908–1910	29	23	1	-	71	(Australia)	—
2	Arthur Butler	1908–1911	95	20	20	0	100	(Australia)	—
3	Harry Butler	1908–1915	96	16	8	0	64	—	—
4	Jack Cochrane	1908	9	1	0	0	3	—	—
5	Arthur Conlin	1908–1911	30	13	32	1	105	(Australia)	—
6	Jim Davis	1908–1910, 1912, 1914–1919	66	11	20	0	87		—
7	Ed Fry	1908	9	2	0	0	6	—	—
8	Dick Green	1908–1909, 1912	27	7	16	0	53	—	—
9	Arthur Hennessy	1908–1911	26	7	1	0	23	(Australia)	—
10	Fred Jarman	1908	9	2	0	0	6	—	—
11	Jack Leveson	1908–1913	45	10	1	0	11	—	—
12	John Rosewell	1908–1910	29	4	5	0	22	(Australia)	—
13	Frank Storie	1908–1909	13	8	0	0	24	—	—
14	Billy Cann	1908–1916	72	32	4	0	104	(Australia)	—
15	Jack Coxon	1908–1911	21	4	0	0	12	—	—
16	Tom Golden	1908–1909	7	2	0	0	6	—	—
17	William Neill	1908–1909	18	0	0	0	0	(Australia)	—
18	Leo Senior	1908	4	3	0	0	9	—	—
19	Bruce Douglas	1908	1	0	0	0	0	—	—
20	Dick Wylie	1908	1	0	0	0	0	—	—
21	Bill Harden	1908	1	0	0	0	0	—	—
22	Arthur McCallum	1908	2	0	0	0	0	—	—
23	George Wells	1908	2	0	0	0	0	—	—
24	Pat Carroll	1909–1910	10	1	0	0	3	—	—
25	George Dawson	1909	2	1	0	0	3	—	—
26	Henry Fletcher	1909	1	0	0	0	0	—	—
27	Fred Fry	1909–1911	22	9	0	0	27	—	—
28	Howard Hallett	1909–1924	155	23	22	12	137	(Australia)	—
29	Hash Thompson	1909–1916	50	18	1	0	56	—	—
30	Alexander Ross	1909	5	2	0	0	6	—	—
31	Tom McCann	1909–1912	2	0	0	0	0	—	—
32	Steve Darmody	1910–1912	21	6	22	0	62	—	—
33	Arthur McCabe	1910–1914	65	46	3	0	144	—	—
34	Bill Spence	1910–1914	56	10	2	0	34	(Australia)	—
35	Charlie Waite	1910	1	0	0	0	0	—	—
36	Peter Burge	1910	2	0	0	0	0	—	—
37	Ernie Hucker	1910, 1912	18	5	0	0	15	—	—
38	Harry Pearce	1910	4	1	0	0	3	—	—
39	Frank Twiss	1910	3	0	0	0	0	—	—
40	Os Brown	1911–1915	48	7	2	0	25	—	—
41	Herb Gilbert	1911–1915	23	6	2	2	26	(Australia)	—
42	Eddie Hilliard	1911–1917	74	5	1	0	17	—	—
43	Harry Nicholls	1911–1914	25	6	1	0	20	—	—
44	Johnno Stuntz	1911	6	1	0	0	3	—	—
45	Charlie Collier	1911–1912	19	12	1	0	38	—	—
46	Bill Groves	1911	1	0	0	0	0	—	—
47	Robert Thompson	1911	3	2	0	0	6	—	—
48	Tom Butler	1911	3	0	0	0	0	—	—
49	Wally Dymant	1911–1917	32	0	30	0	60	—	—
50	Norman Leary	1911	2	1	2	0	7	—	—
51	W Rix	1911	1	0	0	0	0	—	—
52	Owen McCarthy	1912–1917	78	0	0	0	0	—	—
53	Perce Hale	1912	5	0	0	0	0	—	—
54	George Maidment	1912	6	1	12	0	27	—	—
55	Roy Almond	1912–1917	38	4	0	0	12	—	—
56	Harold Horder	1912–1919, 1924	86	102	77	1	462	(Australia)	—
57	Ed Rigney	1912	1	0	0	0	0	—	—
58	Harry Brighton	1913	9	0	0	0	0	—	—
59	Clarrie Horder	1913–1921	80	41	14	0	151	—	—
60	William Hilliard	1913–1915	10	0	0	0	0	—	—
61	Harry R. Thompson	1913–1914	12	4	1	0	14	—	—
62	William Lewis	1913	11	1	0	0	3	—	—
63	J Forgie	1913	2	0	0	0	0	—	—
64	Robert Coulter	1913	1	0	0	0	0	—	—
65	Fred Crook	1913	1	0	0	0	0	—	—
66	A Phelan	1913	1	1	0	0	3	—	—
67	Ray Norman	1914–1916	38	5	1	0	17	—	—
68	George Reynolds	1914	8	1	2	0	7	—	—
69	John Kerwick	1915–1922	83	18	0	0	54	—	—
70	Rex Norman	1915–1917, 1919	40	11	0	0	33	—	—
71	George Hartman	1915	2	0	0	0	0	—	—
72	Bill Tijou	1915	1	0	0	0	0	—	—
73	F Howard	1915	4	1	0	0	3	—	—
74	Arthur Oxford	1915–1921	76	18	121	0	296	(Australia)	—
75	Bill Rowley	1915–1919	17	1	0	0	3	—	—
76	Andy Morris	1915	1	0	0	0	0	—	—
77	George Lindsay	1916	5	0	0	0	0	—	—
78	George McGowan	1916–1918	39	4	11	0	34	—	—
79	George Moore	1916–1919	43	3	0	0	9	—	—
80	Ted Nicholls	1916	7	5	0	0	15	—	—
81	C Phelps	1916–1918	24	2	0	0	6	—	—
82	Harry Clarke	1916	8	2	0	0	6	—	—
83	E Anderson	1916–1919	12	1	0	0	3	—	—
84	J Kearns	1916–1917	8	0	0	0	0	—	—
85	Peter Cruise	1916–1918	3	0	0	0	0	—	—
86	Gordon Vaughan	1916–1921	36	25	1	0	77	—	—
87	Jim Breen	1917–1918	14	6	0	0	18	—	—
88	William Bruce	1917	9	2	0	0	6	—	—
89	Bill Cameron	1917, 1922–1923	24	4	0	0	12	—	—
90	Alf Blair	1917–1930	158	39	120	0	357	(Australia)	—
91	George Lucas	1917	7	1	15	0	33	—	—
92	Vince Sheehan	1917–1922	44	22	0	0	66	—	—
93	Jack Lawrence Sr.	1918–1928	67	16	41	0	130	—	—
94	Dave Lindsay	1918–1920	14	1	0	0	3	—	—
95	Harold Holmes	1918–1920	25	5	1	0	17	—	—
96	Claud O'Donnell	1918	12	1	0	0	3	—	—
97	Les Arthur	1918	2	2	0	0	6	—	—
98	Ted Coyne	1918	2	1	0	0	3	—	—
99	Bill Sheehan	1918	1	0	0	0	0	—	—
100	Perce Horne	1919–1924	28	0	2	0	4	—	—
101	Jack Baker	1919–1920	24	5	0	0	15	—	—
102	Cec Blinkhorn	1919, 1924	16	7	0	0	21	(Australia)	—
103	Lionel Sheeley	1919	2	0	0	0	0	—	—
104	Bill Hucker	1919	2	0	0	0	0	—	—
105	Ernie Swinnerton	1919–1921	19	3	0	0	9	—	—
106	Reg Fusedale	1919–1920	12	6	2	0	22	—	—
107	Jack Blinco	1920	6	0	0	0	0	—	—
108	Ted McGrath	1920–1922	15	5	2	0	19	—	—
109	Bill Gillespie	1920–1923	45	8	0	0	24	—	—
110	Vic Lawrence	1920–1928	93	44	1	0	134	—	—
111	George Johnson	1920–1922	14	1	0	0	3	—	—
112	Pat Murphy	1920–1926	39	4	0	0	12	—	—
113	Fred Funnell	1921–1923	30	4	0	0	12	—	—
114	Bryan Maloney	1921	2	2	0	0	6	—	—
115	Ern Wilmot	1921–1924	49	0	0	0	0	—	—
116	Benny Wearing	1921–1933	172	144	202	0	836	(Australia)	—
117	Wade Lane	1921–1922	7	2	0	0	6	—	—
118	Alec Johnson	1922–1925	32	6	0	0	18	—	—
119	Alf O'Connor	1922–1929	83	14	0	0	42	(Australia)	—
120	Frank Brogan	1922–1929	50	5	0	0	15	—	—
121	Tom Barry	1922–1927	35	11	0	0	33	—	—
122	Robert Booth	1922	1	1	0	0	3	—	—
123	Oscar Quinlivan	1923–1930	91	26	34	0	146	—	—
124	Wal Allan	1923	1	0	0	0	0	—	—
125	Hector Courtenay	1923	6	0	5	0	10	—	—
126	Phil Bagwill	1923	4	0	0	0	0	—	—
127	David Watson	1923–1931	82	9	1	0	29	—	—
128	Dave Hickey Sr.	1923–1925	13	0	0	0	0	—	—
129	Bob Linklater	1923	1	0	0	0	0	—	—
130	Edward Root	1923–1929, 1931–1933	99	34	1	0	104	—	—
131	Dick Burke	1923	1	0	0	0	0	—	—
132	H Andrews	1924	2	0	0	0	10	—	—
133	Roy Beiber	1924–1926	6	0	0	0	0	—	—
134	Alby Carr	1924–1927	51	19	0	0	57	—	—
135	Harry Cavanough	1925–1928	50	13	0	0	39	—	—
136	Jack Jones	1925–1933	44	4	32	0	76	—	—
137	Ernie Lapham	1925–1928	35	36	1	0	110	—	—
138	Jack Lodge	1925–1927	18	6	0	0	18	—	—
139	Arch Thompson	1925	1	0	0	0	0	—	—
140	Les Dolan	1925	1	0	0	0	0	—	—
141	Alan Righton	1925–1931	74	4	6	1	26	—	—
142	Sid Harris	1926–1934	66	27	0	0	81	—	—
143	Harry Finch	1926–1934	62	38	0	0	114	—	—
144	George Treweek	1926–1934	120	39	0	0	117	(Australia)	—
145	Jack Why	1926–1934	77	32	0	0	96	(Australia)	—
146	Reg Williams	1926–1931	23	16	2	0	24	—	—
147	Hector Melville	1927	2	0	0	0	0	—	—
148	Tom Craigie	1927–1930	10	2	0	0	6	—	—
149	Michael O'Connor	1927–1928	16	0	0	0	0	—	—
150	Vic Funnell	1927	2	0	0	0	0	—	—
151	Chas Fennell	1927–1934	38	3	0	0	9	—	—
152	Harry Kadwell	1927–1930	40	14	16	0	74	(Australia)	—
153	Frank O'Connor	1927–1937	72	14	0	0	42	(Australia)	—
154	Dick Kerr	1927–1929	2	0	0	0	0	—	—
155	Frank Crowe	1928–1933	7	0	0	0	0	—	—
156	Paddy Maher	1928–1932	44	11	0	0	33	(Australia)	—
157	Alf Binder	1928–1930	36	10	0	0	30	—	—
158	Jim Tait	1928–1936	16	4	3	0	18	—	—
159	Mick Manning	1928–1930	14	3	0	0	9	—	—
160	William Dennett	1929–1930	6	1	0	0	3	—	—
161	Carl Eggen	1929–1931	26	9	0	0	27	—	—
162	Harry Eyers	1929–1936	57	18	0	0	54	—	—
163	Albert Spillane	1929–1934	52	2	14	1	36	—	—
164	Charlie Lloyd	1930–1933	13	3	0	0	9	—	—
165	Paddy Stewart	1930–1936	29	5	2	0	19	—	—
166	Fred Chaplin	1930–1932	10	4	0	0	12	—	—
167	Billy Lloyd	1930	2	1	0	0	3	—	—
168	Sid Riddell	1930	2	0	0	0	0	—	—
169	Harold Johnston	1931–1939	13	1	1	0	5	—	—
170	Tom McLachlan	1931	8	0	0	0	0	—	—
171	Jack Morrison	1931–1933	35	8	4	0	32	—	—
172	Alan Pritchard	1931–1933	4	0	0	0	0	—	—
173	Percy Williams	1931–1938	80	19	186	0	429	(Australia)	—
174	Frank Curran	1931–1937	71	16	1	0	50	(Australia)	–
175	Jim Deeley	1931–1934	37	7	0	0	21	—	—
176	Jack Peterson	1931–1932	16	0	0	0	0	—	—
177	G Whitmore	1931	1	0	0	0	0	—	—
178	Hugh Byrne	1932–1933	8	5	0	0	15	—	—
179	Sid Sampson	1932–1934	9	4	0	0	12	—	—
180	Vic Moses	1932–1934	4	0	0	0	0	—	—
181	Eric Lewis	1932–1937	76	7	1	0	47	(Australia)	—
182	E Stanger	1932	3	0	0	0	0	—	—
183	Alby Black	1932–1933	10	4	0	0	12	—	—
184	Eroll Collins	1932–1933	8	0	0	0	0	—	—
185	Jack Lennox	1933–1934	12	3	0	0	9	—	—
186	Clinton Quinlivan	1933–1934	10	4	0	0	12	—	—
187	Jack Lonard	1933	3	0	0	0	0	—	—
188	Jim Veney	1933	1	0	0	0	0	—	—
189	Jack Coyne	1933–1935	10	1	0	0	3	—	—
190	H Lundy	1933	2	0	0	0	0	—	—
191	Frank Young	1933–1935	3	1	0	0	3	—	—
192	G Algie	1933	1	0	0	0	0	—	—
193	Joe Jacobs	1933	5	0	0	0	0	—	—
194	Les McDonald	1933–1940	26	0	19	0	38	—	—
195	Arthur McPherson	1933	1	0	0	0	0	—	—
196	Arthur Dean	1934–1937	22	8	0	0	24	—	—
197	G Potter	1934	3	0	0	0	0	—	—
198	E Pratt	1934	1	0	0	0	0	—	—
199	Fred Blann	1934–1940	23	13	0	0	39	—	—
200	Eddie Hinson	1934–1945	82	14	0	0	42	—	—
201	John Kollias	1934	3	0	0	0	0	—	—
202	John Hurst	1934–1935	3	0	0	0	0	—	—
203	Keith Wylie	1934–1936	15	7	0	0	21	—	—
204	Michael Williams	1934–1935	18	0	0	0	0	—	—
205	John Anderson	1935	5	0	0	0	0	—	—
206	John Caffrey	1935	3	0	0	0	0	—	—
207	Harleigh Hanrahan	1935	7	1	0	0	4	—	—
208	Bernard Martin	1935–1936	9	8	0	0	24	—	—
209	Jack McCormack	1935	17	6	0	0	18	—	—
210	Harry Thompson	1935–1939	64	42	0	0	126	—	—
211	Sid Mannix	1935	1	0	0	0	0	—	—
212	Jimmy Stiff	1935–1937	18	1	2	0	7	—	—
213	Eddie Finucane	1935–1936	25	8	0	0	24	—	—
214	George Kilham	1935–1943	95	16	0	0	48	—	—
215	Alby Thorne	1935–1942	11	6	1	0	20	—	—
216	George Shankland	1935	5	2	0	0	6	—	—
217	Jack Hewitt	1935–1936	3	0	0	0	0	—	—
218	Walter Cameron	1935–1936	3	1	0	0	3	—	—
219	Leo Perry	1935	1	0	0	0	0	—	—
220	Bob Banham	1936–1937, 1941	30	8	0	0	24	—	—
221	Fred Felsch	1936–1944	98	22	188	0	442	—	—
222	Sam Griffiths	1936–1937	20	2	0	0	6	—	—
223	Alan Quinlivan	1936–1945	62	42	5	0	139	—	—
224	C Sutton	1936	2	0	0	0	0	—	—
225	Bill Halloway	1936	5	0	0	0	0	—	—
226	Joe Brennan	1936	1	0	0	0	0	—	—
227	Jack Munn	1936	2	0	0	0	0	—	—
228	Johnny Brown	1937–1940	51	10	0	0	30	—	—
229	Don Manson	1937–1941	21	24	0	0	72	—	—
230	Jack Walsh	1937–1944	96	12	0	0	36	—	—
231	Hilton Delaney	1937	1	0	0	0	0	—	—
232	Alf Fairhall	1937	1	1	0	0	3	—	—
233	Ray Byrne	1938–1939	21	7	0	0	21	—	—
234	Percy Fairall	1938–1940	35	5	6	0	27	—	—
235	Dick Johnson	1938–1939	29	2	1	0	8	—	—
236	Alan Schafer	1938–1940	7	0	0	0	0	—	—
237	Frank McCann	1938	10	3	0	0	9	—	—
238	Brian Murphy	1938	6	2	0	0	6	—	—
239	Bill Schmidt	1938	2	0	0	0	0	—	—
240	Tom Voce	1938	1	0	0	0	0	—	—
241	Vince Mahboub	1938	2	0	0	0	0	—	—
242	Rod McFarlane	1938	2	0	0	0	0	—	—
243	Alan Tuohey	1938–1939	20	11	0	0	33	—	—
244	George Boyd	1938	2	0	0	0	0	—	—
245	Jack Kadwell	1938–1940	20	1	0	0	3	—	—
246	Bill Schofield	1938	1	0	0	0	0	—	—
247	Dave Woods Sr.	1938–1943	10	4	0	0	12	—	—
248	Albert Lee	1938	1	0	1	0	41	—	—
249	Jim Armstrong	1939–1947	84	28	4	0	92	(Australia)	—
250	Ray Hines	1939	3	0	0	0	0	—	—
251	Tom Henry	1939	1	0	0	0	0	—	—
252	John Whitfield	1939–1945	35	9	0	0	27	—	—
253	Arthur Mather	1930–1940	8	1	0	0	3	—	—
254	Albert Webster	1939–1946	16	3	0	0	9	—	—
255	Harry Paul	1939	2	0	0	0	0	—	—
256	Clem Kennedy	1939–1946	40	14	0	0	42	(Australia)	—
257	Don McInerney	1939–1940	5	2	1	0	8	—	—
258	Bill Goodwin	1940–1941	7	1	0	0	2	—	—
259	Keith Murray	1940–1941	7	4	0	0	12	—	—
260	Jack Wunsch	1940–1946	56	19	0	0	57	—	—
261	Johnny Parker	1940	1	0	0	0	0	—	—
262	Leon Quinlivan	1940–1944	20	4	1	0	14	—	—
263	Tommy Robertson	1940	7	1	0	0	3	—	—
264	Ernie Singles	1940–1943	24	5	0	0	15	—	—
265	Kevin Willcocks	1940–1946	29	2	0	0	6	—	—
266	Howard Hallett Jr.	1940–1949	61	9	17	0	61	—	—
267	Jim Hale	1940	3	1	0	0	3	—	—
268	Vince Hardiman	1940	4	0	0	0	0	—	—
269	Reg Kable	1940–1941	8	0	0	0	0	—	—
270	Ernie Cox	1940–1942	10	4	0	0	12	—	—
271	Sid Feegan	1940–1946	26	2	0	0	6	—	—
272	Billy Stokes	1940–1945	22	2	21	0	48	—	—
273	Neville Jack	1940–1941	4	0	0	0	0	—	—
274	Johnny Abel	1941	7	1	0	0	3	—	—
275	Percy Jacobsen	1941	2	1	0	0	3	—	—
276	Cyril Pyle	1941–1946	9	2	0	0	6	—	—
277	Vic Anderson	1941–1946	15	1	0	0	3	—	—
278	Fred Lane	1941–1947	55	2	0	0	6	—	—
279	Wally McAnulty	1941–1944	6	1	0	0	3	—	—
280	Jock Livingston	1941–1943	18	0	13	0	26	—	—
281	Wally Finch	1941–1942	8	3	8	0	25	—	—
282	Fred Worrall	1941–1942	21	3	0	0	9	—	—
283	Henry Bowers	1941	6	0	0	0	0	—	—
284	Jim Dennehy	1941–1942	13	6	0	0	18	—	—
285	George Jones	1941–1942	28	2	0	0	6	—	—
286	Jim Cooke	1942	8	0	1	0	2	—	—
287	Jim Thorne	1942	3	1	0	0	3	—	—
288	Alf Gallagher	1942	2	0	0	0	0	—	—
289	George Landow	1942–1943	8	1	0	0	3	—	—
290	Fred Baber	1942–1943	7	0	0	0	0	—	—
291	John Williamson	1942	3	1	0	0	3	—	—
292	Dave Ross	1942	2	0	0	0	0	—	—
293	Les Brown	1942–1945	19	5	0	0	15	—	—
294	Billy Thompson	1942–1946	32	1	0	0	3	(Australia)	—
295	Eddie McGrath	1942	3	0	0	0	0	—	—
296	Frank McDowell	1942–1943	13	0	0	0	0	—	—
297	Frank Curry	1943–1945	26	7	0	0	21	—	—
298	Jack Hutchinson	1943–1945	19	4	0	0	12	(Australia)	—
299	Robin Smith	1943–1946	27	10	0	0	30	—	—
300	Les Gilbert	1943–1944	7	0	0	0	0	—	—
301	Les Bell	1943–1946	21	0	17	0	34	—	—
302	Arthur Slattery	1943–1945	21	4	0	0	12	—	—
303	John Melvaine	1943–1944	5	0	0	0	0	—	—
304	Arthur Harris	1943–1944	8	3	0	0	9	—	—
305	Jack Lawrence Jr.	1944–1945	19	2	0	0	6	—	—
306	Bill Sherwood	1944–1945	6	0	3	0	6	—	—
307	Ed Bray	1944–1946	21	0	0	0	0	—	—
308	Frank Bonner	1944–1947	24	0	62	0	124	—	—
309	Des Fullerton	1944	7	1	2	0	7	—	—
310	Bill Robinson	1944	2	0	0	0	0	—	—
311	Jim Mangan	1944–1946	12	7	0	0	21	—	—
312	Ed Griffiths	1944–1945	6	1	0	0	3	—	—
313	John Patterson	1944	1	0	0	0	0	—	—
314	Bill Mackie	1944–1945	6	0	0	0	0	—	—
315	George Haddon	1945–1946	11	0	0	0	0	—	—
316	Vince Lawrence	1945–1946	23	2	0	0	6	—	—
317	Neville Stokes	1945–1946	4	0	0	0	0	—	—
318	Ken Brogan	1945–1953	77	13	29	0	97	—	—
319	Jim Borger	1945–1946	12	2	0	0	6	—	—
320	Cec King	1945–1946	5	3	0	0	9	—	—
321	Keith Smith	1945	2	0	0	0	0	—	—
322	Stan Bailey	1945	1	0	0	0	0	—	—
323	Keith Aitken	1945–1949	64	5	0	0	15	—	—
324	Joe Leo	1945	2	0	2	0	4	—	—
325	Tom Wood	1945	1	0	2	0	4	—	—
326	Dave Hickey Jr.	1946	3	0	0	0	0	—	—
327	Jack Rayner	1946–1957	194	58	8	6	190	(Australia)	—
328	Eric Anderson	1946–1948	25	5	0	0	15	—	—
329	Sam Beddy	1946	3	1	0	0	3	—	—
330	Bill Sweeney	1946	3	0	0	0	0	—	—
331	Alec Tracey	1946–1949	10	8	0	0	24	—	—
332	Fred Miller	1946–1947	11	4	0	0	12	—	—
333	Kevin Timbs Snr.	1946	3	1	0	0	3	—	—
334	Doug Barwick	1946–1948	10	0	0	0	0	—	—
335	Bob Burke	1947	1	0	0	0	0	—	—
336	Ted Butler	1947	4	0	20	0	40	—	—
337	Les Cowie	1947–1957	178	66	0	0	198	AUS	—
338	Jack Devery	1947	11	2	0	0	6	—	—
339	Jim Joy	1947	2	0	0	0	0	—	—
340	Bill Mullane	1947–1948	21	0	0	0	0	—	—
341	Neville Smith	1947	10	0	0	0	0	—	—
342	Eric Magill	1947	1	0	0	0	0	—	—
343	Ian Verrender	1947	2	0	0	0	0	—	—
344	Ernie Hammerton	1947–1958	157	10	1	0	32	(Australia)	—
345	Jack Lannon	1947	2	1	0	0	3	—	—
346	George Morton	1947–1948	3	2	0	0	6	—	—
347	Alan Stolzenheim	1947–1948	14	6	0	0	18	—	—
348	Alec Johnston	1947–1948	8	4	0	0	12	—	—
349	Jack Melville	1947–1949	31	7	0	0	21	—	—
350	John Graves	1947–1952	77	79	158	0	(Australia)	—	
351	Jim Hunt	1947–1948	3	0	0	0	0	—	—
352	Clive Churchill	1947–1958	157	13	77	0	193	(Australia)	—
353	Len Allmond	1947–1949	36	30	0	0	90	—	—
354	Tom Cameron	1947	1	0	0	0	0	—	—
355	John Payne	1948	1	0	0	0	0	—	—
356	Barry Redding	1948–1949	21	4	27	0	66	—	—
357	Terry Crowe	1948	5	0	0	0	0	—	—
358	Bruce Devlin	1948	13	2	0	0	6	—	—
359	Gordon Glasscock	1948	4	0	3	0	6	—	—
360	Jimmy O'Connor	1948–1949	14	3	0	0	9	—	—
361	Ron Brightwell	1948	4	8	0	0	0	—	—
362	Bill Collins	1948	8	0	0	0	0	—	—
363	George Kempshall	1948	6	3	0	0	9	—	—
364	Denis Donoghue	1948–1957	171	25	1	0	77	(Australia)	—
365	Ed Crawford	1948	4	1	0	0	3	—	—
366	Don Murdoch	1948–1956	45	3	9	0	27	—	—
367	Max Bennett	1948	1	0	0	0	0	—	—
368	Len Haskins	1948–1950	9	4	0	0	12	—	—
369	Jack Quinlivan	1948	1	0	0	0	0	—	—
370	Norm Nilson	1948–1955	23	3	0	0	9	—	—
371	Norm Spillane	1948–1953	41	13	0	0	39	—	—
372	Jim Evans	1948	1	0	0	0	0	—	—
373	Des Bryan	1949–1951	25	7	0	0	21	—	—
374	Cec Fitzsimmons	1949	3	0	0	0	0	—	—
375	Bernie Purcell	1949–1960	173	36	509	1	1126	(Australia)	—
376	Ken Stephen	1949	8	0	0	0	0	—	—
377	Eddie Tracey	1949	6	2	0	0	6	—	—
378	Arthur Moynihan	1949	3	0	0	0	0	—	—
379	Milton Atkinson	1950–1953	42	14	0	0	42	—	—
380	Bryan Orrock	1950–1952	50	7	0	0	21	—	—
381	Cliff Smailes	1950–1953	57	25	0	0	75	—	—
382	Bill Stewart	1950–1951	30	6	0	0	18	—	—
383	Kevin Woolfe	1950–1954	78	28	8	0	100	—	—
384	Greg Hawick	1950–1956	81	19	63	0	183	(Australia)	—
385	Ken Macreadie	1950–1953	40	11	0	0	33	—	—
386	Ray Nielson	1950–1952	12	6	0	0	18	—	—
387	William Sneddon	1950	2	0	0	0	0	—	—
388	Pat Conaghan	1950	1	0	0	0	0	—	—
389	Reg Curran	1950	1	0	0	0	0	—	—
390	Ray Thomas	1950, 1957	12	2	21	0	48	—	—
391	Harry Wells	1951	6	3	0	0	9	—	—
392	Bill Maloney	1951	2	0	0	0	0	—	—
393	Ray Mason	1951–1957	90	6	0	0	18	—	—
394	Brian Hogan	1951	1	1	0	0	3	—	—
395	Ian Moir	1952–1958	110	105	0	0	(Australia)	—	
396	Frank Threlfo	1952–1953	39	24	0	0	72	—	—
397	Wally Floyd	1952	2	0	0	0	0	—	—
398	Malcolm Spencer	1952, 1955	14	4	0	0	12	—	—
399	Alan Dennis	1953	9	2	0	0	6	—	—
400	Pat Thornton	1953	4	0	0	0	0	—	—
401	John Dougherty	1953–1956	56	31	15	0	123	—	—
402	Martin Gallagher	1953–1958	78	13	1	0	41	—	—
403	Joe Renshaw	1953–1956	18	8	0	0	24	—	—
404	Jim Richards	1953–1957	75	4	0	0	12	—	—
405	John Sellgren	1953	2	2	0	0	6	—	—
406	Brian Murray	1953–1961	40	1	3	0	9	—	—
407	Bob Moon	1953–1957	19	7	0	0	21	—	—
408	Les Brennan	1954–1955	24	32	0	0	96	—	—
409	Frank Lloyd	1954–1956	8	2	0	0	6	—	—
410	Bob Honeysett	1954–1957	52	25	0	0	75	—	—
411	Doug Boatwright	1954	1	0	0	0	0	—	—
412	Bob Sait	1954–1955	6	1	0	0	3	—	—
413	Col Donohoe	1955–1959	85	13	10	0	39	—	—
414	Jimmy Fligg	1955–1956	2	0	0	0	0	—	—
415	Dale Puren	1955–1959	50	30	27	0	144	—	—
416	Bill Sandstrom	1955	1	0	0	0	0	—	—
417	John Cottee	1956–1960	53	7	0	0	21	—	—
418	Alan Flockton	1956–1961	21	1	2	0	7	—	—
419	Brian Hambly	1956–1958	33	7	0	0	21	—	—
420	Bob McWilliams	1956–1958	3	0	0	0	0	—	—
421	Keith Middleton	1956	12	0	0	0	0	—	—
422	Fred Nelson	1956–1961	82	9	0	0	27	—	—
423	Bruce Ranier	1956–1958	22	2	1	0	8	—	—
424	Eric Sladden	1956–1961	82	56	0	0	168	—	—
425	Kevin Turner	1956–1958	15	16	0	0	48	—	—
426	Mark Pryke	1957–1959	3	0	0	0	0	—	—
427	Ron Taylor	1957–1962	40	4	20	0	52	—	—
428	Brian Wright	1957–1958	13	6	0	0	18	—	—
429	Jim Campbell	1957	2	0	0	0	0	—	—
430	Colin Bakes	1957–1959	7	0	0	0	0	—	—
431	Nev Turner	1957–1958	8	0	6	0	12	—	—
432	Danny Byrnes	1958	4	0	0	0	0	—	—
433	Arthur Lang	1958–1961	52	5	0	0	15	—	—
434	Richie Powell	1958–1967	97	10	0	0	30	—	—
435	Russell Butler	1958	1	0	0	0	0	—	—
436	Jim Hall	1958	1	0	0	0	0	—	—
437	Warren Glanville	1958	1	0	0	0	0	—	—
438	Vic Mossman	1958	6	2	0	0	6	—	—
439	Bill Bennett	1959–1960	17	2	25	1	58	—	—
440	Tom Cocking	1959–1962	13	0	0	0	0	—	—
441	Charlie Gibson	1959–1962	31	2	0	0	6	—	—
442	John Shearer	1959–1960	24	4	0	0	12	—	—
443	Geoff Smith	1959	10	1	0	0	3	—	—
444	John Porter	1959	4	0	2	0	4	—	—
445	Les Broach	1959–1961	23	0	0	0	0	—	—
446	Keith Carroll	1959	2	0	0	0	0	—	—
447	Ray Picklum	1959	4	0	0	0	0	—	—
448	John Gudgeon	1959–1961	31	4	0	0	12	—	—
449	Sam Martin	1959	6	3	0	0	9	—	—
450	Bob Wallace	1959–1961	15	5	5	0	25	—	—
451	Charlie Donovan	1959–1960	8	2	0	0	6	—	—
452	Ken Anderson	1960–1961	19	2	0	0	6	—	—
453	Ron Brown	1960	5	0	0	0	0	—	—
454	Merv Cross	1960–1961	23	0	0	0	0	—	—
455	Ron Lovett	1960	15	2	1	0	8	—	—
456	Alan Scott	1960, 1966–1969	35	4	0	0	12	—	—
457	Darrel Chapman	1960–1964	61	10	0	0	30	—	—
458	Fonda Metassa	1960–1961	13	6	0	0	18	—	—
459	Laurie Haynes	1960–1961	8	1	0	0	3	—	—
460	Russell Addison	1960–1961	10	0	0	0	0	—	—
461	Frank Connolly	1960	2	1	0	0	3	—	—
462	Gary Deazey	1960–1962	9	3	0	0	9	—	—
463	Kevin Roberts	1960–1965	13	2	0	0	6	—	—
464	Eric Robinson	1961–1964	42	18	3	0	60	—	—
465	Bill Stokes Jr.	1961–1962	23	2	14	0	34	—	—
466	Bob Richardson	1961	2	1	0	0	3	—	—
467	Jack Coyne Jr.	1961–1963	27	1	0	0	3	—	—
468	Frank Clegg	1961	1	0	0	0	0	—	—
469	Mick Falla	1961–1966	63	2	0	0	6	—	—
470	Ken Kay	1961–1962	14	0	0	0	0	—	—
471	Kevin Longbottom	1961–1969	105	27	134	0	349	—	—
472	Bill Summerhayes	1961	8	1	0	0	3	—	—
473	Tom Craigie Jr.	1961–1962	3	0	0	0	0	—	—
474	Michael Cleary	1962–1970	140	88	1	0	266	AUS	—
475	Bob Gehrke	1962–1963	4	0	0	0	0	—	—
476	Henry Morris	1962	18	1	0	0	3	—	—
477	John Robinson	1962–1964	37	0	38	0	76	—	—
478	Bill Tonkin	1962	13	1	0	0	3	—	—
479	Dave Woods Jr.	1962	4	1	0	0	3	—	—
480	Jim Chapman	1962–1963	27	0	0	0	0	—	—
481	Ron Crowe	1962	15	0	0	0	0	AUS	—
482	Wally Hourn	1962	3	2	0	0	8	—	—
483	Bill McCarthy	1962–1964	10	0	0	0	0	—	—
484	Wally Watsford	1962	3	0	0	0	0	—	—
485	John Burns	1962	1	0	0	0	0	—	—
486	Trevor Heiler	1962	6	0	0	0	0	—	—
487	Jimmy Lisle	1962–1968	100	7	0	0	21	AUS	—
488	Paul Gibson	1962	2	0	0	0	0	—	—
489	Greg McMillan	1962–1965	32	8	94	0	212	—	—
490	Geoff Meaney	1962	2	0	0	0	0	—	—
491	Don Margan	1962	3	0	0	0	0	—	—
492	Harold Thompson	1962	1	0	0	0	0	—	—
493	Bob Hough	1962	5	0	0	0	0	—	—
494	Dennis Lee	1962–1972	30	5	0	0	15	—	—
495	Barry Harris	1963–1964	8	0	0	0	0	—	—
496	John Hynes	1963–1965	9	0	0	0	0	—	—
497	Bob McCarthy	1963–1974, 1978	211	100	0	1	301	AUS	—
498	Bill Owen	1963–1964	32	3	0	0	9	—	—
499	Dave Perrin	1963	2	0	2	0	4	—	—
500	John Sattler	1963–1972	197	12	0	0	36	AUS	—
501	Alan Skene	1963	16	2	0	0	6	SAF	—
502	Warren Thompson	1963	12	0	0	0	0	—	—
503	Fred Jackson	1963	2	0	0	0	0	—	—
504	John Coleman	1963–1966	7	1	0	0	3	—	—
505	Arthur Branighan	1963–1971	92	20	0	0	60	—	—
506	Greg Christensen	1963–1964	3	0	0	0	0	—	—
507	Bob McKenzie	1963–1964	4	1	0	0	3	—	—
508	Rod Gorman	1963–1967	12	0	0	0	0	—	—
509	Ron McPherson	1963	1	0	0	0	0	—	—
510	Fred Anderson	1964–1967	56	6	0	0	18	—	—
511	Jim M. Campbell	1964	1	0	0	0	0	—	—
512	Ron Coote	1964–1971	148	48	0	0	144	AUS	—
513	Wayne Stevens	1964–1968	16	9	1	0	29	—	—
514	Chris Armstrong	1964–1965	4	1	0	0	3	—	—
515	Ted Lawler	1964	3	1	0	0	3	—	—
516	John Willmott	1964	3	0	0	0	0	—	—
517	Ivan Jones	1965–1969	80	13	6	0	51	—	—
518	John O'Neill	1965–1971	128	11	0	0	33	AUS	—
519	Colin Dunn	1965–1967	12	2	4	0	14	—	—
520	Alan Heiler	1965–1972	43	22	0	0	66	—	—
521	Jim Morgan	1965–1969	59	3	0	1	11	AUS	—
522	Bob Moses	1965–1970	94	12	0	0	36	—	—
523	Brian Cottell	1965	1	0	0	0	0	—	—
524	Gary Stevens	1965–1976	163	12	0	0	36	AUS	—
525	Eric Simms	1965–1975	206	23	803	86	1841	AUS	—
526	Bob Grant	1966–1975	136	20	0	4	68	AUS	—
527	Brian James	1966–1969	79	32	0	0	96	AUS	—
528	John Lawrence	1966	2	0	0	0	0	—	—
529	Ralph Grace	1966	2	0	0	0	0	—	—
530	Bob Honan	1967–1975	1	0	0	0	0	—	—
531	Dallas O'Neill	1967–1971	15	0	0	0	0	—	—
532	George Piggins	1967–1978	118	6	0	0	18	—	—
533	Greg Norgard	1967–1972	21	4	0	0	12	—	—
534	Elwyn Walters	1967–1973	129	17	0	0	51	AUS	—
535	Paul Sait	1968–1978	160	31	0	0	93	AUS	—
536	Ray Branighan	1968–1971	57	26	31	0	140	AUS	—
537	Denis Pittard	1968–1973	121	56	0	0	168	AUS	—
538	Russell Amatto	1968	1	1	0	0	3	—	—
539	Kerry Burke	1969–1972	18	7	0	0	21	—	—
540	Keith Edwards	1969–1975	85	28	0	0	84	—	—
541	Shane Day	1969	1	0	0	0	0	—	—
542	Peter Brown	1970–1974	14	5	0	0	15	—	—
543	Alan Burke	1970	1	0	0	0	0	—	—
544	Darrell Bampton	1970–1979	51	1	0	0	3	—	—
545	Phil Smith	1971–1973	20	8	0	0	24	—	—
546	Gordon Fraser	1971–1972	21	2	0	0	6	—	—
547	Claude Williams	1971–1973	13	3	12	0	33	—	—
548	Herbie Timms	1971–1977	56	7	0	0	21	—	—
549	Bob Bolin	1971, 1974	2	0	0	0	0	—	—
550	Steve Kosta	1971–1973	19	9	0	0	27	—	—
551	Jeff Withers	1971–1976	52	14	0	0	42	—	—
552	Bob Broad	1972–1973	14	1	0	0	3	—	—
553	Tom Mooney	1972–1974	62	29	0	0	87	—	—
554	Paul Hills	1972–1973	2	0	0	0	0	—	—
555	Ross Birrell	1972–1975	56	10	38	1	107	—	—
556	Noel Murray	1972–1973	8	2	0	0	6	—	—
557	Warren Knox	1972	1	0	0	0	0	—	—
558	Tom Lyons	1972	1	0	0	0	0	—	—
559	John Bringolf	1972	1	0	0	0	0	—	—
560	Mick Byrne	1972–1973	2	0	0	0	0	—	—
561	Eric Cain	1972	1	1	0	0	3	—	—
562	Jim Hall	1973	12	1	1	0	5	—	—
563	Rod Urquhart	1973–1974	24	2	0	0	6	—	—
564	Jeff Williams	1973–1974	10	2	0	0	6	—	—
565	Frank Curry Jr.	1973	4	0	0	0	0	—	—
566	John Kay	1973–1977	12	2	3	0	12	—	—
567	Greg Longhurst	1973–1974	11	0	0	0	0	—	—
568	Bill Moore	1973–1974	3	0	0	0	0	—	—
569	Steve Reilly	1973–1974	17	1	0	0	3	—	—
570	John Schmitzer	1973	1	0	0	0	0	—	—
571	Bob McMillan	1973–1980	55	5	0	0	15	—	—
572	Tom Moylan	1973–1974	17	8	0	0	24	—	—
573	Brian Wall	1973–1977	28	4	27	0	66	—	—
574	John Kearns	1973	2	0	0	0	0	—	—
575	Harry Eden	1974–1975	38	17	0	0	51	—	—
576	Steve Magnus	1974–1979	20	3	0	0	9	—	—
577	Owen O'Donnell	1974–1975	27	10	0	0	30	—	—
578	Peter van Gulik	1974–1975	23	3	0	0	9	—	—
579	Steve Little	1974–1978	57	15	50	0	145	—	—
580	Brad Jones	1974–1975	9	0	0	0	0	—	—
581	Barry Wood	1974	8	3	0	0	9	—	—
582	Peter Reed	1974	1	0	0	0	0	—	—
583	Bill Sawers	1974–1975	11	0	0	0	0	—	—
584	John Dykes	1975, 1978	17	0	0	0	0	—	—
585	Bernie Lowther	1975–1976	42	14	0	0	42	—	—
586	Greg Purcell	1975–1977	41	6	53	0	124	—	—
587	Steve Kovacs	1975	4	0	0	0	0	—	—
588	Glen Porter	1975–1977	24	1	0	0	3	—	—
589	John Marsh	1975–1978	5	1	0	0	3	—	—
590	Brian Smith	1975, 1979	17	0	0	0	0	—	—
591	Terry Gibson	1975–1977	2	0	0	0	0	—	—
592	Ken Stewart	1975–1983	145	6	0	0	18	—	—
593	Andrew Donnelly	1975–1976	9	3	0	0	9	—	—
594	Ambrose Morgan	1975	3	0	0	0	0	—	—
595	John Berne	1976–1979	73	9	3	0	33	—	—
596	Terry Fahey	1976–1980	89	47	28	0	197	AUS	—
597	Gary Souter	1976	6	0	0	0	0	—	—
598	Bill Annabel	1976–1978	36	2	0	0	6	—	—
599	John Delaney	1976	7	0	0	0	0	—	—
600	Trevor Reardon	1976–1977	38	3	0	0	9	—	—
601	David Grant	1976	1	1	0	0	3	—	—
602	John Burke	1976	10	0	0	0	0	—	—
603	Rod Irons	1976	1	0	0	0	0	—	—
604	Paul Peachey	1976	1	1	0	0	3	—	—
605	Gary Haig	1976	1	0	0	0	0	—	—
606	Graham West	1976–1977	13	1	17	0	37	—	—
607	Paul Larsen	1976–1977	9	2	0	0	6	—	—
608	Gary Wright	1976–1981	71	19	0	0	57	—	—
609	Warren Griffin	1976	1	0	0	0	0	—	—
610	Glen Bishop	1977–1978	7	0	0	0	0	—	—
611	Geoff Bultitude	1977	15	2	0	0	6	—	—
612	Ian Mackay	1977	13	0	0	0	0	—	—
613	Paul O'Brien	1977	7	1	0	0	3	—	—
614	Bill Hilliard	1977	5	0	0	0	0	—	—
615	Les Mara	1977	18	4	0	1	13	—	—
616	Richard Tongue	1977	7	0	0	0	0	—	—
617	David Sinclair	1977–1981	53	7	0	0	21	—	—
618	Ian Miller	1977	6	0	0	0	0	—	—
619	Grant Jones	1977–1981	18	7	18	2	59	—	—
620	Jim Swift	1977–1980	40	9	1	0	29	—	—
621	Dave Seelin	1977–1978	5	1	0	0	3	—	—
622	Peter Tunks	1977–1983	98	27	0	0	86	—	—
623	Harry Bryant	1978–1982	7	0	0	0	0	—	—
624	John Peek	1978–1981	60	13	0	0	39	—	—
625	Trevor Barnes	1978–1979	25	2	4	2	16	—	—
626	Arthur Kitinas	1978	3	1	0	0	3	—	—
627	Robert Laurie	1978–1980	64	16	1	0	50	—	—
628	John Sellar	1978–1979	14	1	0	0	3	—	—
629	Bruce Buchan	1978	8	0	0	0	0	—	—
630	Morrie Griffiths	1978–1980	6	0	0	0	0	—	—
631	Col Cheeseman	1978–1980	13	1	0	0	3	—	—
632	Eric Ferguson	1978–1981	32	4	116	0	244	—	—
633	Bob Stratton	1978	4	0	0	0	0	—	—
634	Nathan Gibbs	1978–1983	86	27	0	0	87	—	—
635	Steve Sydenham	1978–1979	4	0	0	0	0	—	—
636	Denis Corak	1978–1979	9	2	0	0	6	—	—
637	Gary Knight	1978–1980	36	12	3	0	42	—	—
638	Kevin Roche	1978–1979	7	1	0	0	3	—	—
639	Paul Beauchamp	1979	7	1	0	0	3	—	—
640	Charlie Frith	1979–1981	49	1	0	0	3	—	—
641	Rod McGregor	1979	6	0	0	0	0	—	—
642	Fred Pagano	1979	5	0	0	0	0	—	—
643	Don Prior	1979	10	1	0	0	3	—	—
644	Dean Rampling	1979–1984	46	1	0	0	3	—	—
645	Steve Topper	1979	7	0	0	0	0	—	—
646	John Floyd	1979	1	0	0	0	0	—	—
647	Joe Squadrito	1979–1983	58	8	6	1	37	—	—
648	Chris Ross	1979	3	0	0	0	0	—	—
649	Gary Hambly	1979–1983	88	7	0	0	23	—	NSW
650	Shane Arneil	1979–1983	49	8	0	0	24	—	—
651	Michael Carberry	1980–1984	68	7	0	1	27	—	—
652	Ziggy Niszczot	1980–1984	114	39	0	0	129	—	NSW
653	Pat Smith	1980	6	1	5	0	13	—	—
654	Wayne McPherson	1980	1	0	1	0	2	—	—
655	Michael Prest	1980	2	0	0	0	0	—	—
656	Steve Walsh	1980–1983	58	12	35	0	106	—	—
657	Greg Mackey	1980–1983	28	6	0	0	18	—	—
658	Chris Walters	1980	1	0	0	0	0	—	—
659	Mitch Brennan	1981–1982	41	16	0	0	48	—	QLD
660	Russell Fairfax	1981	4	1	0	0	3	—	—
661	Garry Metcalfe	1981–1983	46	0	0	0	0	—	—
662	Michael Mosman	1981	5	0	0	0	0	—	—
663	Graham Murray	1981–1983	43	7	0	0	21	—	—
664	Michael Pattison	1981–1982	32	8	0	0	24	—	—
665	John Cook	1981	2	0	0	0	0	—	—
666	Kyle Connor	1981	1	0	0	0	0	—	—
667	Mark Ross	1981–1987	63	26	59	0	206	—	—
668	Tony Rampling	1981–1986, 1989	91	4	0	0	14	—	—
669	Paul Jelfs	1981	6	1	0	0	3	—	—
670	Arthur Mountier	1981	4	0	0	0	0	—	—
671	Craig Mullins	1981	2	0	0	0	0	—	—
672	Robert Simpkins	1981–1983	40	12	0	0	38	—	—
673	Paul West	1981–1982	11	0	8	0	16	—	—
674	Mario Fenech	1981–1990	181	18	0	1	73	—	NSW
675	Greg Nixon	1981	2	0	0	0	0	—	—
676	Tony Melrose	1982–1983	50	10	148	12	340	—	NSW
677	Peter Smith	1982–1983	93	10	0	1	41	—	—
678	Ken Wright	1982–1983	36	6	5	11	41	—	—
679	David Boyle	1982–1991	169	7	0	0	28	—	NSW
680	Joe Reaiche	1982	2	0	0	0	0	—	—
681	Danny Loftus	1982	8	2	0	0	6	—	—
682	Stan Browne	1982–1983	30	8	0	0	28	—	—
683	Craig Coleman	1982–1992	208	25	0	8	108	—	—
684	Geoff Smith	1982	1	0	0	0	0	—	—
685	Greg Evans	1983–1986	17	0	1	0	2	—	—
686	John Jarvie	1983	13	0	0	0	0	—	—
687	Michael Pobjie	1983–1987	91	28	0	0	112	—	—
688	Bill Walker	1983	17	2	0	0	8	—	—
689	Darren McCarthy	1983–1986	54	22	0	0	88	—	—
690	Les Biles	1983–1987	53	14	0	0	56	—	—
691	Kelvin Eirth	1983	1	0	0	0	0	—	—
692	George Longbottom	1983–1985	14	7	2	1	31	—	—
693	Wayne Lonergan	1983	4	0	0	0	0	—	—
694	Bill Hardy	1983–1985	37	5	0	0	20	—	—
695	Rick Bourke	1983	1	0	0	0	0	—	—
696	Ross Harrington	1983–1991	102	15	0	0	60	—	—
697	Neil Baker	1984–1987	87	15	206	31	503	—	—
698	Les Davidson	1984–1990	113	5	0	0	20	AUS	NSW
699	Marty Gurr	1984	15	4	0	0	16	—	—
700	John Kambas	1984	1	0	0	0	0	—	—
701	Terry Murphy	1984–1985	17	4	0	0	16	—	—
702	Rick Montgomery	1984	2	0	0	0	0	—	—
703	Michael Andrews	1984–1993	181	21	7	0	98	—	—
704	Joe Thomas	1984–1987	20	2	0	0	8	—	—
705	Michael Speechley	1984–1985	4	0	0	0	0	—	—
706	Corey Adams	1984	2	0	0	0	0	—	—
707	Russell Bartlett	1984	1	0	0	0	0	—	—
708	Mark Ellison	1984, 1987–1990	85	10	164	9	377	—	—
709	Paul Akkary	1984–1985	25	0	0	0	0	—	—
710	Todd Bishop	1984	1	0	0	0	0	—	—
711	John Elias	1984	4	0	0	0	0	—	—
712	Bronko Djura	1984–1985, 1988–1989	79	11	45	1	135	—	—
713	Mark Judd	1984	1	0	0	0	0	—	—
714	Royce Ayliffe	1985	11	0	0	0	0	—	—
715	Wayne Chisholm	1985–1991	115	12	0	0	48	—	—
716	Col Murphy	1985	4	0	0	0	0	—	—
717	Matt Cruickshank	1985–1986	9	0	0	0	0	—	—
718	Tony Davies	1985	3	0	0	0	0	—	—
719	Brett Ross	1985–1988	46	9	0	0	36	—	—
720	Mark Kyle	1985	1	0	0	0	0	—	—
721	Henderson Gill	1985	8	4	0	0	16	GBR	—
722	Michael Markou	1985	1	0	0	0	0	—	—
723	Peter Davies	1985	2	1	0	0	4	—	—
724	Alan Nelson	1985–1987	2	0	0	0	0	—	—
725	Phil Gould	1986	23	1	0	0	4	—	—
726	David Moon	1986–1988	24	3	0	0	12	—	—
727	Ian Roberts	1986–1989	65	5	0	0	20	—	—
728	Brad Webb	1986–1987	10	3	0	0	12	—	—
729	Glen Graham	1986	1	0	0	0	0	—	—
730	Paul Judd	1986–1988	8	1	0	0	4	—	—
731	David Cruickshank	1986–1989	45	6	0	0	24	—	—
732	Paul Roberts	1986–1991	70	14	0	0	56	—	—
733	Andrew Mack	1986–1987	4	0	0	0	0	—	—
734	Craig Weeks	1986–1989	9	1	0	0	4	—	—
735	Jason Moon	1986–1988	31	5	0	0	20	—	—
736	Lindsay Johnston	1986–1989	27	0	0	0	0	—	—
737	Luke Beasley	1987–1988	10	0	0	0	0	—	—
738	Michael Blake	1987–1988	36	2	0	0	8	—	—
739	Phil Blake	1987–1990	75	37	8	6	170	—	NSW
740	Steve Mavin	1987–1990	88	24	0	0	96	—	—
741	David Hosking	1987–1989	15	0	0	0	0	—	—
742	Trevor Tuckwell	1987–1988	11	0	0	0	0	—	—
743	Warren Lee	1987–1988	10	0	0	0	0	—	—
744	Darren Maroon	1987–1992, 1994	58	2	0	0	8	—	—
745	Adam O'Neill	1987–1990	37	14	0	0	56	—	—
746	John Bilbija	1988	4	0	0	0	0	—	—
747	Bruce Longbottom	1988–1990	49	16	0	0	64	—	—
748	Leslie White	1988	4	0	0	0	0	—	—
749	Graham Lyons	1988–1991	60	16	0	0	64	—	NSW
750	Scott Wilson	1988–1990	13	3	0	0	12	—	—
751	Steve Fenech	1988–1991	11	0	0	0	0	—	—
752	Steve O'Dea	1988–1992	28	3	0	0	12	—	—
753	Rod Maybon	1988–1993	78	10	33	1	107	—	—
754	Charlie Saab	1988–1991	32	5	56	0	132	—	—
755	Michael Mills	1989–1991	16	1	0	0	4	—	—
756	Rick Stone	1989	3	0	0	0	0	—	—
757	Darren Brown	1989–1990, 1992–1993	70	18	1	0	74	—	—
758	Darren Schott	1989–1993	43	11	0	0	44	—	—
759	Blake Butcher	1989–1993	23	0	0	0	0	—	—
760	Jim Serdaris	1989–1992	69	11	0	0	44	—	—
761	Mark Lyons	1989–1991	29	5	0	0	20	—	—
762	Manoa Thompson	1989–1993	61	29	0	2	118	—	—
763	Mark Carroll	1990–1993, 1999	84	6	0	1	25	AUS	NSW
764	Terry Hill	1990	9	2	0	0	8	—	—
765	Darrell Trindall	1990–1999	150	44	73	6	328	—	—
766	Sean Garlick	1990–1993, 1998–1999	96	14	0	0	56	—	—
767	Mark Blackburn	1990	6	0	0	0	0	—	—
768	Brett Cook	1990–1991	3	0	0	0	0	—	—
769	Michael Koellner	1990	9	2	0	0	8	—	—
770	Anthony Castro	1990	2	0	0	0	0	—	—
771	Brad Hayes	1990	4	0	0	0	0	—	—
772	Vince Cibulka	1990–1991	3	0	0	0	0	—	—
773	Craig Field	1990–1996	85	22	83	0	254	—	—
774	John Georgas	1990	1	0	0	0	0	—	—
775	John Larkin	1990	1	0	0	0	0	—	—
776	Sandy Campbell	1991	19	3	0	0	12	—	—
777	Ron Timbery	1991	3	0	0	0	0	—	—
778	Jason Williams	1991	16	12	0	0	48	—	—
779	Warren Ferguson	1991	2	1	0	0	4	—	—
780	Keith Cole	1991	7	0	0	0	0	—	—
781	Nick Zisti	1991–1993	12	0	0	0	0	—	—
782	Billy Noke	1991	6	0	0	0	0	—	—
783	Paul Carr	1991	1	0	0	0	0	—	—
784	Paul Mellor	1991–1996, 2006–2007	107	45	0	0	180	—	—
785	Greg Keenan	1991–1993	12	2	3	0	14	—	—
786	Corey Murray	1991–1993	12	1	0	0	4	—	—
787	Eion Crossan	1992–1993	22	3	76	0	164	—	—
788	Matt Goodwin	1992	7	0	0	0	0	—	—
789	Tim Horan	1992–1994	17	5	0	0	20	—	—
790	Brian Jackson	1992	2	0	0	0	0	—	—
791	Peter Johnston	1992–1993	33	3	0	0	12	—	—
792	Anthony Kaberry	1992–1994	16	0	0	0	0	—	—
793	Darren Stewart	1992	1	0	0	0	0	—	—
794	Paul Fuller	1992–1993	12	1	0	0	4	—	—
795	John Minto	1992–1993	15	4	0	0	16	—	—
796	Brett Patterson	1992–1993	20	10	0	0	40	—	—
797	Tim Fuller	1992	1	0	0	0	0	—	—
798	Andrew McIlwaine	1992–1993	14	0	0	0	0	—	—
799	Arthur Pappas	1992	3	0	0	0	0	—	—
800	Daniel Coote	1992	1	0	0	0	0	—	—
801	James Hinchey	1992	7	0	0	0	0	—	—
802	Brent Hill	1992–1993	4	0	0	0	0	—	—
803	John Lintmeijer	1992–1993	10	3	0	0	12	—	—
804	Stuart Coupland	1993–1994	6	0	0	0	0	—	—
805	Matt Fuller	1993	15	0	0	0	0	—	—
806	Mark G. Lyons	1993–1995	19	2	0	0	8	—	—
807	Sean Skelton	1993	13	1	0	0	4	—	—
808	Shane Wilson	1993–1997	71	19	19	0	114	—	—
809	Evan Cochrane	1993	2	0	0	0	0	—	—
810	Jeremy Donougher	1993–1995	51	3	0	0	12	—	—
811	Brandon Pearson	1993	6	4	0	0	16	—	—
812	Troy Slattery	1993–1999	46	3	0	0	12	—	—
813	Michael Francis	1993–1999	56	3	0	0	12	—	—
814	Terry Hermansson	1993–1994	28	4	0	0	16	NZL	—
815	Duncan McRae	1993–1995	23	4	0	0	16	—	—
816	Craig Salmon	1993	3	0	0	0	0	—	—
817	David Webber	1993–1995	11	3	0	0	12	—	—
818	Tyran Smith	1993–1996	52	8	0	0	32	NZL	—
819	Peter Baumgart	1993	1	0	0	0	0	—	—
820	Paul Israel	1993	3	0	0	0	0	—	—
821	Cole Skelly	1993–1997	8	0	5	0	10	—	—
822	Phil McDonald	1993	1	0	0	0	0	—	—
823	Jason Bell	1994–1996	58	13	1	0	53	—	—
824	Jamie Corcoran	1994–1995	16	5	0	0	20	—	—
825	Brett Goldspink	1994	20	2	0	0	8	—	—
826	Jason Hedges	1994	4	0	0	0	0	—	—
827	Mark McGaw	1994–1995	22	3	0	0	12	—	—
828	Tony Mestrov	1994–1995	30	3	0	0	12	—	—
829	David Penna	1994–1997	56	19	0	0	76	—	—
830	Paul Quinn	1994–1997	46	4	0	0	16	—	—
831	Dean Schifilliti	1994	6	0	0	0	0	—	—
832	Dennis Beecraft	1994–1995	8	1	0	0	4	—	—
833	Joe Faimalo	1994	1	0	0	0	0	—	—
834	Michael Kearney	1994	2	0	0	0	0	—	—
835	Jamie Kelso	1994–1995	8	1	0	0	4	—	—
836	Aaron McLean	1994	8	1	0	0	4	—	—
837	Michael Peachey	1994	1	0	0	0	0	—	—
838	Jacin Sinclair	1994–1996	28	6	0	1	25	—	—
839	Scott Tronc	1994	7	0	0	0	0	—	—
840	Vaea Taliai	1994	10	4	0	0	16	—	—
841	Craig Gibson	1994–1996	8	4	0	0	16	—	—
842	Brett Langford	1994–1995	8	0	0	0	0	—	—
843	Gene Ngamu	1994	1	0	0	0	0	—	—
844	Craig Carrington	1995	2	0	0	0	0	—	—
845	Shannon Donato	1995–1997	19	3	0	0	12	—	—
846	Greg Drake	1995	9	0	0	0	0	—	—
847	Jason Keough	1995	6	0	0	0	0	—	—
848	Jason Tassell	1995–1997	31	0	0	0	0	—	—
849	Andrew Willett	1995	14	0	35	0	70	—	—
850	Adam Wright	1995–1996	5	0	0	0	0	—	—
851	Will Robinson	1995–1996	25	5	0	0	20	—	—
852	Greg Clarke	1995–1996	13	2	0	0	8	—	—
853	John Fearnley	1995	3	0	0	0	0	—	—
854	Jamil Khadem	1995	4	1	0	0	4	—	—
855	Craig Smith	1995	7	1	0	0	4	—	—
856	Peter Driscoll	1995–1997	37	1	0	0	4	—	—
857	Scott Breen	1995	2	0	0	0	0	—	—
858	Richard McKell	1995–1996	18	1	0	0	4	—	—
859	Jason Ryan	1995–1996	6	1	0	0	4	—	—
860	Paul Shahin	1995	4	0	0	0	0	—	—
861	Shaun Walliss	1995–1996	7	0	0	0	0	—	—
862	Lee Jackson	1995	8	2	0	0	8	—	—
863	Matt Nable	1995	3	0	0	0	0	—	—
864	Danny O'Keefe	1995–1997	34	9	0	0	36	—	—
865	Andy Patmore	1995	2	0	0	0	0	—	—
866	Damian Browne	1995–1996	16	2	0	0	8	—	—
867	Anthony Hancock	1995–1996	11	0	0	0	0	—	—
868	Adam McEwen	1995–1997	28	1	0	0	4	—	—
869	Grant McWhirter	1995–1996	4	0	0	0	0	—	—
870	Nigel Waugh	1995–1997	4	0	0	0	0	—	—
871	Martin Masella	1996	17	0	0	0	0	—	—
872	Paul McNicholas	1996–1999, 2002	34	0	0	0	0	—	—
873	Corin Ridding	1996	10	1	0	0	4	—	—
874	Craig Salvatori	1996	22	2	0	0	8	—	—
875	Shane Vincent	1996	1	0	0	0	0	—	—
876	Phil Howlett	1996–1998	45	12	0	0	48	TON	—
877	David Leigh	1996	2	0	0	0	0	—	—
878	Bart Williams	1996–1997	9	1	0	0	4	—	—
879	Marty Moore	1996–1997	31	8	0	0	32	—	—
880	Geordi Peats	1996–1998	20	5	0	0	20	—	—
881	Ian Rubin	1996–1999	45	0	0	0	0	—	—
882	Dean Amos	1996–1997	7	0	0	0	0	—	—
883	Gary Price	1996	1	0	0	0	0	—	—
884	Darren Burns	1997–1998	41	6	0	0	24	—	—
885	Matthew Hogan	1997	6	2	0	0	8	—	—
886	Matt Manning	1997	5	2	10	0	28	—	—
887	Don McLeod	1997	9	6	0	0	24	—	—
888	Damian O'Donnell	1997	1	0	0	0	0	—	—
889	Brendan O'Meara	1997–1998	30	2	0	0	8	—	—
890	Michael Ostini	1997–1998	29	1	0	0	4	—	—
891	Matt Parsons	1997–1999	58	2	0	0	8	—	—
892	Craig Simon	1997	18	1	0	0	4	—	—
893	Paul Sutton	1997	10	1	0	0	4	—	—
894	Chris Crotty	1997	1	0	0	0	0	—	—
895	Aaron White	1997	10	0	0	0	0	—	—
896	Brett Gillard	1997	7	0	0	0	0	—	—
897	Scott Murray	1997–1999	16	0	0	0	0	—	—
898	Peter Stimson	1997	9	2	0	0	8	—	—
899	Willie Peters	1997–1998, 2003–2004	38	4	3	1	23	—	—
900	Julian O'Neill	1997–1999	54	9	101	0	238	—	QLD
901	Jeff Orford	1997	10	5	0	0	20	—	—
902	Jack Slockee	1997	1	0	0	0	0	—	—
903	Tere Glassie	1997	3	0	0	0	0	—	—
904	Tate Moseley	1997	2	0	0	0	0	—	—
905	Garth Wood	1997	6	0	0	0	0	—	—
906	Troy Barnes	1997	3	1	1	0	6	—	—
907	Tim Brasher	1998–1999	40	14	0	0	56	—	—
908	Chris Caruana	1998–1999, 2002	49	6	0	0	24	—	—
909	David Hall	1998	5	0	0	0	0	—	—
910	Justin Loomans	1998–1999	35	12	0	0	48	—	—
911	Brett Rodwell	1998–1999	46	10	0	0	40	—	—
912	Jeremy Schloss	1998–1999	45	2	0	0	8	—	—
913	Jimmy Smith	1998–1999	47	7	0	0	28	—	—
914	Craig Wing	1998–1999, 2008–2009	71	20	1	0	82	—	NSW
915	Matt Munro	1998	17	0	0	0	0	—	—
916	Simon Forrest	1998	9	4	16	0	48	—	—
917	Brian Siemson	1998	2	0	0	0	0	—	—
918	Shane Millard	1998	1	0	0	0	0	—	—
919	Justin Doyle	1998–1999	14	0	0	0	0	—	—
920	Andrew Dunemann	1999	5	1	0	0	4	—	—
921	Lee Hookey	1999, 2003–2005	67	22	0	0	88	—	—
922	Tony Iro	1999	22	1	0	0	4	—	—
923	Jason Nicol	1999	19	2	0	0	8	—	—
924	Wayne Richards	1999	17	1	0	0	4	—	—
925	Robert Tocco	1999	11	0	0	0	0	—	—
926	Wes Patten	1999	11	3	0	0	12	—	—
927	Peter Clarke	1999	1	0	0	0	0	—	—
928	Owen Craigie	2002–2004	54	11	31	2	108	—	—
929	Jason Death	2002–2004	44	0	0	0	0	—	—
930	Glenn Grief	2002	1	0	0	0	0	—	—
931	Brent Grose	2002	24	9	0	0	36	—	—
932	Andrew Hart	2002–2003	36	7	0	0	28	—	—
933	Andrew King	2002	20	4	0	0	16	—	—
934	Duncan MacGillivray	2002–2003	23	0	0	0	0	—	—
935	Wade McKinnon	2002–2003	26	9	0	0	36	—	—
936	Scott McLean	2002	9	6	24	0	72	—	—
937	Adam Muir	2002	16	0	0	0	0	—	—
938	Adam Peek	2002	10	0	0	0	0	—	—
939	Russell Richardson	2002–2003	22	8	0	0	32	—	—
940	Shane Rigon	2002–2007	99	12	0	0	48	—	—
941	Paul Stringer	2002–2004	48	5	0	0	20	—	—
942	Luke Stuart	2002–2011	190	6	0	0	24	—	—
943	Brad Watts	2002–2005	63	15	19	0	98	—	—
944	Jamie Fitzgerald	2002–2003	15	2	0	0	8	—	—
945	Scott Geddes	2002–2012	125	5	0	0	20	—	—
946	Terry Lamey	2002	2	0	0	0	0	—	—
947	Blaine Stanley	2002	7	1	3	0	10	—	—
948	Anthony Colella	2002	5	0	0	0	0	—	—
949	Andrew Hinson	2002	5	3	0	0	12	—	—
950	Frank Puletua	2002–2003	26	3	0	0	12	—	—
951	Wes Maas	2002	2	0	0	0	0	—	—
952	Brett Sheehan	2002	8	3	5	0	22	—	—
953	Nathan Merritt	2002–2003, 2006–2014	218	146	34	1	653	—	NSW
954	Justin Brooker	2002	7	1	0	0	4	—	—
955	Jay Bandy	2002	2	0	0	0	0	—	—
956	Noah Sete	2002	2	0	0	0	0	—	—
957	Nathan DeBartolo	2002	4	0	0	0	0	—	—
958	Joel Penny	2002	2	0	0	0	0	—	—
959	Joven Clarke	2002–2006	8	4	0	0	16	—	—
960	Beau Mundine	2002–2004	2	0	0	0	0	—	—
961	John Olzard	2002	3	1	1	0	6	—	—
962	Gerald Symonds	2002	2	0	0	0	0	—	—
963	Filimone Lolohea	2002–2004	9	0	0	0	0	—	—
964	Michael Berne	2002	1	1	0	0	4	—	—
965	Mark Meredith	2002–2003	5	1	0	0	4	—	—
966	Ahmad Bajouri	2003	11	0	0	0	0	—	—
967	Bryan Fletcher	2003–2005	45	15	0	0	60	AUS	NSW
968	Ashley Harrison	2003–2005	66	21	0	0	84	—	QLD
969	Stacey Katu	2003	2	0	0	0	0	—	—
970	Brett Kearney	2003–2005	28	5	0	0	20	—	—
971	Justin Smith	2003–2004	30	10	49	0	138	—	—
972	Chris Walker	2003	5	1	0	0	4	—	—
973	Shane Walker	2003–2006	67	4	0	0	16	—	—
974	Mark Minichiello	2003–2006	85	16	0	0	64	—	—
975	Jamie Russo	2003–2004	19	2	0	0	8	—	—
976	Wise Kativerata	2003	9	6	0	0	24	—	—
977	Damon Alley-Tovio	2003–2004	4	0	0	0	0	—	—
978	David Fa'alogo	2003–2009	142	24	0	0	96	NZL	—
979	Danny McAllister	2003	1	0	0	0	0	—	—
980	Jess Caine	2003	4	2	0	0	8	—	—
981	Jared Taylor	2003	1	0	0	0	0	—	—
982	Luke MacDougall	2003–2006	47	31	0	0	124	—	—
983	Ryan Tandy	2003	3	0	0	0	0	—	—
984	Troy Robinson	2003	2	0	0	0	0	—	—
985	James Storer	2003	2	0	0	0	0	—	—
986	Glenn Hall	2004–2005	19	2	0	0	8	—	—
987	Adam MacDougall	2004–2006	31	5	0	0	20	—	—
988	Willie Manu	2004	19	1	0	0	4	—	—
989	Todd Polglase	2004–2006	38	10	0	0	40	—	—
990	Matt Riddle	2004	2	1	6	0	16	—	—
991	Shane Marteene	2004–2005	22	5	0	0	20	—	—
992	Mark Leafa	2004	5	0	0	0	0	—	—
993	Steve Skinnon	2004	5	2	0	0	8	—	—
994	Dean Byrne	2004	1	0	2	0	4	—	—
995	David Thompson	2004	15	1	0	0	4	—	—
996	Wes Tillott	2004	15	4	0	0	16	—	—
997	Rhys Hanbury	2004	2	0	0	0	0	—	—
998	Joe Williams	2004–2007	46	7	126	4	284	—	—
999	John Sutton	2004–2019	336	61	7	1	259	—	—
1000	Mark Christensen	2004	1	0	0	0	0	—	—
1001	Roy Bell	2004–2005	9	7	1	0	30	—	—
1002	Scott Logan	2004–2005	22	1	0	0	4	—	—
1003	Chris Enahoro	2004–2005	2	0	0	0	0	—	—
1004	Peter Cusack	2005–2007	73	3	0	0	12	—	—
1005	Shannon Hegarty	2004–2008	59	10	0	0	40	—	—
1006	Peter Taylor	2005	1	0	0	0	0	—	—
1007	Trent Young	2005–2006	15	1	0	0	4	—	—
1008	Manase Manuokafoa	2005–2008	71	4	0	0	16	TON	—
1009	Ben Walker	2005–2006	21	5	43	3	109	—	—
1010	Michael Moran	2005	11	2	0	0	8	—	—
1011	Yileen Gordon	2005–2008	34	11	0	0	44	—	—
1012	Shannan McPherson	2005–2011	93	2	0	0	8	—	—
1013	Beau Champion	2005–2010	70	33	5	0	142	—	—
1014	Joe Galuvao	2006–2007	23	3	0	0	12	—	—
1015	Jaiman Lowe	2006–2010	50	2	0	0	8	—	—
1016	Stuart Webb	2006–2007	21	2	0	0	8	—	—
1017	Ben Rogers	2006–2008	36	6	0	1	25	—	—
1018	Michael Greenfield	2006–2009	24	1	0	0	4	—	—
1019	Germaine Paulson	2006–2008	17	3	0	0	12	—	—
1020	Joe Lichaa	2006	2	0	0	0	0	—	—
1021	David Peachey	2006–2007	25	7	0	0	28	—	—
1022	Kane Cleal	2006	9	0	0	0	0	—	—
1023	Dale Newton	2006	1	0	0	0	0	—	—
1024	Fetuli Talanoa	2006–2013	95	40	0	0	160	TON	—
1025	Eddie Paea	2006–2008	8	3	1	0	14	TON	—
1026	Roy Asotasi	2007–2013	133	12	0	0	48	NZL→SAM	—
1027	Daniel Irvine	2007	11	1	0	0	4	—	—
1028	David Kidwell	2007–2009	38	3	0	0	12	NZL	—
1029	Jeremy Smith	2007–2008	26	4	0	0	16	NZL	—
1030	Nigel Vagana	2007–2008	32	10	0	0	40	SAM	—
1031	Dean Widders	2007–2008	34	7	0	0	28	—	—
1032	Reece Simmonds	2007	7	1	2	0	8	—	—
1033	Issac Luke	2007–2015	189	36	134	0	412	NZL	—
1034	Eddy Pettybourne	2007–2012	91	13	0	0	52	—	—
1035	Ben Lowe	2008–2015	117	7	1	0	30	—	—
1036	George Ndaira	2008	14	0	2	0	4	—	—
1037	Beau Falloon	2008–2010	25	3	0	0	12	—	—
1038	Sam Huihahau	2008	2	0	0	0	0	—	—
1039	John Tamanika	2008	3	0	0	0	0	—	—
1040	Luke Capewell	2008–2010	28	15	0	0	60	—	—
1041	Chris Sandow	2008–2011	84	19	198	13	485	—	—
1042	Jamie Simpson	2008–2010	37	16	0	0	64	—	—
1043	Colin Best	2009–2010	44	18	0	0	72	—	—
1044	Shaune Corrigan	2009–2012	26	1	0	0	4	—	—
1045	Rhys Wesser	2009–2011	41	16	0	0	64	—	—
1046	Michael Crocker	2009–2013	68	5	0	0	20	—	QLD
1047	Garret Crossman	2009–2010	18	0	0	0	0	—	—
1048	David Tyrrell	2009–2017	158	7	0	0	78	—	—
1049	Chris McQueen	2009–2015	117	25	0	0	100	—	—
1050	Taioalo Vaivai	2009–2011	4	1	0	0	4	—	—
1051	Jason Clark	2009–2018	172	11	1	0	46	—	—
1052	Sam Burgess	2010–2014, 2016–2019	182	44	0	0	176	ENG	—
1053	David Taylor	2010–2012	63	18	0	0	72	—	QLD
1054	Craig Stapleton	2010	3	0	0	0	0	—	—
1055	Dylan Farrell	2010–2012	70	31	0	0	124	—	—
1056	Greg Inglis	2011–2019	146	87	0	1	293	AUS	QLD
1057	Ben Ross	2011	24	1	0	0	4	—	—
1058	Kane Morgan	2011	1	0	0	0	0	—	—
1059	Nathan Peats	2011–2013	55	6	0	0	24	—	—
1060	James Roberts	2011–2012, 2019–2020	28	7	0	0	28	—	NSW
1061	Deon Apps	2011	2	0	0	0	0	—	—
1062	Luke Burgess	2011–2014	52	2	0	0	8	—	—
1063	Matt King	2012–2013	23	3	0	0	12	—	—
1064	Adam Reynolds	2012–2021	231	38	860	22	1896	—	NSW
1065	Andrew Everingham	2012–2013	40	21	0	0	84	—	—
1066	Neccrom Areaiiti	2012	1	0	0	0	0	COK	—
1067	Josh Starling	2012–2013	7	0	0	0	0	—	—
1068	Justin Hunt	2012–2013	13	7	0	0	28	—	—
1069	George Burgess	2012–2019	149	13	0	0	52	ENG	—
1070	Jeff Lima	2013	20	1	0	0	4	SAM	—
1071	Ben Te'o	2013–2014	41	5	0	0	20	—	QLD
1072	Dylan Walker	2013–2015	63	34	2	0	140	AUS	—
1073	Luke Keary	2013–2016	64	13	0	0	52	—	—
1074	Tom Burgess	2013–	249	22	1	0	90	ENG→GBR	—
1075	Joe Picker	2014	11	1	0	0	4	—	—
1076	Lote Tuqiri	2014	16	7	0	0	28	FIJ	—
1077	Nathaniel Neale	2014	1	0	0	0	0	—	—
1078	Joel Reddy	2014–2015	19	9	0	0	36	—	—
1079	Kyle Turner	2014–2019	90	11	0	0	44	—	—
1080	Apisai Koroisau	2014	14	1	0	0	4	FIJ	—
1081	Cameron McInnes	2014–2016	39	6	0	0	24	—	—
1082	Kirisome Auva'a	2014	39	12	0	0	48	—	—
1083	Alex Johnston	2014–	265	240	0	0	960	AUS→PNG	—
1084	Chris Grevsmuhl	2015–2016	30	8	0	0	32	—	—
1085	Glenn Stewart	2015	18	0	0	0	0	—	—
1086	Tim Grant	2015	21	1	0	0	4	—	—
1087	Daryl Millard	2015	4	0	0	0	0	FIJ	—
1088	Nathan Brown	2015–2016	28	1	0	0	4	—	—
1089	Aaron Gray	2015–2017	42	17	0	0	68	—	—
1090	John Olive	2015	1	0	0	0	0	—	—
1091	Paul Carter	2015–2016	16	2	0	0	8	—	—
1092	Damien Cook	2016–2024	207	31	16	0	156	AUS	NSW
1093	Hymel Hunt	2016–2018	46	11	0	0	44	—	—
1094	Zane Musgrove	2016–2018	27	0	0	0	0	—	—
1095	Cody Walker	2016–	247	109	12	0	460	—	NSW
1096	Michael Oldfield	2016	3	2	0	0	(Tonga)	—	
1097	Dane Nielsen	2016–2017	7	3	0	0	12	—	—
1098	Patrice Siolo	2016	2	0	0	0	0	—	—
1099	Jack Gosiewski	2016–2017	6	0	0	0	0	—	—
1100	Siosifa Talakai	2016–2017	11	2	0	0	8	—	—
1101	Joe Burgess	2016	9	5	0	0	20	—	—
1102	Ed Murphy	2016–2017	2	0	0	0	0	—	—
1103	Tautalatasi Tasi	2016	2	0	0	0	0	—	—
1104	Angus Crichton	2016–2018	55	11	0	0	44	—	NSW
1105	Robbie Farah	2017–2018	26	2	0	0	8	LEB	—
1106	Luke Kelly	2017	2	0	0	0	0	—	—
1107	Robbie Rochow	2017	8	0	0	0	0	—	—
1108	Braidon Burns	2017–2021	40	10	0	0	40	—	—
1109	Robert Jennings	2017–2018	34	24	0	0	96	TON	—
1110	Sitiveni Moceidreke	2017	1	1	0	0	4	FIJ	—
1111	Anthony Cherrington	2017	5	0	0	0	0	—	—
1112	Cameron Murray	2017–	182	40	0	0	160	AUS	NSW
1113	Tyrell Fuimaono	2017–2018	20	2	0	0	8	—	—
1114	Campbell Graham	2017–	161	78	0	0	312	AUS	—
1115	Dean Britt	2017–2019	16	1	0	0	4	—	—
1116	Dane Gagai	2018–2021	92	35	8	0	156	AUS	QLD
1117	Richard Kennar	2018, 2022–	27	17	0	0	68	—	—
1118	Mark Nicholls	2018–2022	100	6	0	0	24	—	—
1119	Tevita Tatola	2018–	183	13	0	0	52	TON	—
1120	Adam Doueihi	2018–2019	30	2	10	0	28	—	—
1121	Mawene Hiroti	2018–2019	5	1	0	0	4	—	—
1122	Corey Allan	2019–2020	29	8	0	0	32	—	—
1123	Liam Knight	2019–2023	66	3	0	0	12	—	—
1124	Ethan Lowe	2019–2020	35	5	0	0	20	—	QLD
1125	Rhys Kennedy	2019	2	0	0	0	0	—	—
1126	Jacob Gagan	2019	1	0	0	0	0	—	—
1127	Billy Brittain	2019	2	0	0	0	0	—	—
1128	Bayley Sironen	2019–2020	22	2	0	0	8	—	—
1129	Connor Tracey	2019	1	0	0	0	0	—	—
1130	Tom Amone	2019–2020	9	0	0	0	0	—	—
1131	Jaydn Su'A	2019–2021	52	7	0	0	28	SAM	QLD
1132	Latrell Mitchell	2020–	98	55	229	5	686	AUS	NSW
1133	Hame Sele	2020–2023	49	2	0	0	8	—	—
1134	Troy Dargan	2020	2	0	0	0	0	—	—
1135	Keaon Koloamatangi	2020–	151	26	0	0	104	AUS	NSW
1136	Patrick Mago	2020–2021	23	0	0	0	0	—	—
1137	Jaxson Paulo	2020–2022	43	19	0	0	76	SAM	—
1138	Jack Johns	2020	2	0	0	0	0	—	—
1139	Kurt Dillon	2020	1	0	0	0	0	—	—
1140	Steven Marsters	2020–2021	6	1	0	0	4	—	—
1141	Jed Cartwright	2020–2023	29	1	0	0	4	—	—
1142	Jai Arrow	2021–	100	7	1	0	30	AUS	QLD
1143	Jacob Host	2021–	68	6	0	0	24	—	—
1144	Josh Mansour	2021–2022	16	12	0	0	48	LEB/AUS	—
1145	Benji Marshall	2021	22	3	0	0	12	NZL	—
1146	Dean Hawkins	2021–2024	14	1	9	0	22	—	—
1147	Taane Milne	2021–2024	69	24	1	0	98	FIJ	—
1148	Peter Mamouzelos	2021–	49	5	0	0	20	GRE	—
1149	Blake Taaffe	2021–2023	31	6	60	0	144	—	—
1150	Davvy Moale	2021–	70	5	0	0	20	COK	—
1151	Lachlan Ilias	2021–2024	53	10	2	1	45	GRE	—
1152	Tautau Moga	2021	1	0	0	0	0	—	—
1153	Michael Chee-Kam	2022–2024	38	2	0	0	8	—	—
1154	Siliva Havili	2022–	69	4	0	0	16	—	—
1155	Isaiah Tass	2022–	70	18	2	0	76	—	—
1156	Shaquai Mitchell	2022–	20	1	0	0	4	—	—
1157	Trent Peoples	2022–	2	0	0	0	0	—	—
1158	Kodi Nikorima	2022	15	0	10	0	20	New Zealand	—
1159	Daniel Suluka-Fifita	2022–2023	15	0	0	0	0	—	—
1160	Izaac Thompson	2022–2024	13	6	0	0	24	—	—
1161	Ben Lovett	2023–	3	0	0	0	0	—	—
1162	Tallis Duncan	2023–	73	24	0	0	96	—	—
1163	Tyrone Munro	2023–	19	13	0	0	52	—	—
1164	Jacob Gagai	2024	17	9	0	0	36	—	—
1165	Sean Keppie	2024–	60	3	0	0	12	—	—
1166	Jack Wighton	2024–	55	16	0	0	64	Australia	NSW
1167	Jye Gray	2024–	48	17	0	0	68	—	—
1168	Matt French	2024–	1	0	0	0	0	—	—
1169	Gehamat Shibasaki	2024	1	0	0	0	0	Australia	QLD
1170	Dion Teaupa	2024	4	1	1	0	6	—	—
1171	Matthew French	2024	1	0	0	0	0	---	---
1172	Liam Le Blanc	2024-2026	27	1	0	0	4		
1173	Fletcher Myers	2024-2025	8	2	9	0	26		
1174	Lachlan Hubner	2025 -	44	2	0	0	8		
1175	Jamie Humphreys	2025 -	36	3	17	1	47		
1176	Jayden Sullivan	2025 -	28	1	8	0	20		
1177	Bayleigh Bentley-Hape	2025-2026	10	4	5	0	26	Fiji	
1178	Mikaele Ravalawa	2025	3	0	0	0	0	Fiji	
1179	Euan Aitken	2025-	32	7	0	0	28	Scotland	
1180	Lewis Dodd	2025	6	0	0	0	0		
1181	Ryan Gray	2025	5	0	0	0	0		
1182	Brandon Smith	2025-	22	3	0	0	12	New Zealand	
1183	Ashton Ward	2025-	19	2	17	0	42		
1184	Thomas Fletcher	2025-	7	1	0	0	4		
1185	David Fifita	2026-	17	6	0	0	24	Australia	QLD
1186	Bronson Garlick	2026-	11	0	0	0	0		
1187	Moala Graham-Taufa	2026	2	0	0	0	0		
1188	Matthew Dufty	2026-	15	3	0	0	12		
1189	Edward Kosi	2026-	6	3	0	0	12		
1190	Latrell Siegwalt	2026-	8	2	28	0	64	France	
1191	Adam Elliott	2026-	7	1	0	0	4		
1192	Talanoa Penitani	2026-	1	2	0	0	8		
1193	John Radel	2026-	4	2	0	0	8		
1194	Dayne Jennings	2026-	3	1	0	0	4		

== Club Internationals – Australia ==
The following players have represented Australia whilst playing for South Sydney.

- Tommy Anderson
- Jim Armstrong
- Alf Blair
- Cec Blinkhorn
- Ray Branighan
- Tim Brasher
- Arthur Butler
- Billy Cann
- Mark Carroll
- Clive Churchill
- Michael Cleary
- Arthur Conlin
- Damien Cook
- Ron Coote
- Les Cowie
- Frank Curran
- Steve Darmody
- Les Davidson
- Jim Davis
- Denis Donoghue
- Terry Fahey
- David Fifita
- Harry Finch
- Bryan Fletcher
- Dane Gagai
- Herb Gilbert
- Campbell Graham
- Bob Grant
- John Graves
- Howard Hallett
- Ernie Hammerton
- Greg Hawick
- Bob Honan
- Greg Inglis
- Brian James
- Alex Johnston
- Harry Kadwell
- Clem Kennedy
- John Kerwick
- Keaon Koloamatangi
- Jack Leveson
- Eric Lewis
- Jimmy Lisle
- Bob McCarthy
- Eddie McGrath
- Paddy Maher
- Latrell Mitchell
- Ian Moir
- Cameron Murray
- Ray Norman
- Alf O'Connor
- Frank O'Connor
- John O'Neill
- Arthur Oxford
- George Piggins
- Denis Pittard
- Bernie Purcell
- Jack Rayner
- Eddie Root
- John Rosewell
- Paul Sait
- John Sattler
- Eric Simms
- Bill Spence
- Gary Stevens
- David Taylor
- George Treweek
- Dylan Walker
- Elwyn Walters
- Benny Wearing
- Jack Why
- Percy Williams

Note that Jim Morgan was selected as a reserve for Australia whilst as a player for South Sydney but did not actually take the field in the representative match.

== Represented Australia before or after playing with South Sydney ==
The following players have represented Australia either before or after they played for South Sydney.

- Royce Ayliffe
- Peter Burge
- Hugh Byrne
- Darrel Chapman
- Michael Crocker
- Ron Crowe
- Col Donohoe
- Percy Fairall
- Robbie Farah
- Dane Gagai
- Bob Gehrke
- Brian Hambly
- Shannon Hegarty
- Terry Hill
- Ray Hines
- Johnny Hutchinson
- Luke Keary
- Matt King
- Adam MacDougall
- Ian Mackay
- Mark McGaw
- Keith Middleton
- Jim Morgan
- Adam Muir
- Webby Neill
- Rex Norman
- Claud O'Donnell
- Julian O'Neill
- Bryan Orrock
- Bill Owen
- David Peachey
- Russell Richardson
- Ian Roberts
- Craig Salvatori
- Jim Serdaris
- Gehamat Shibasaki
- Glenn Stewart
- Billy Thompson
- Peter Tunks
- Lote Tuqiri
- Harry Wells
- Craig Wing

== Club Internationals – New Zealand ==
The following players have represented New Zealand whilst playing for South Sydney.

- Roy Asotasi
- David Kidwell
- David Fa'alogo
- Bryson Goodwin
- Terry Hermansson
- Issac Luke
- Gene Ngamu
- Jeremy Smith
- Tyran Smith
- Nigel Vagana^{1}
- Jason Williams

^{1} Represented New Zealand All Golds in 2007

== Club Internationals – Other Countries ==
The following players have represented other rugby league playing nations (i.e. other than Australia or New Zealand) whilst playing for South Sydney.

- Neccrom Areaiiti (Cook Islands)
- Roy Asotasi (Samoa)
- Bayleigh Bentley-Hape (Fiji)
- George Burgess (England)
- Sam Burgess (England)
- Tom Burgess (England)
- Angelo Dymock (Tonga)
- Robbie Farah (Lebanon)
- Tere Glassie (Cook Islands)
- Siliva Havili (Tonga)
- Lachlan Ilias (Greece)
- Robert Jennings (Tonga)
- Alex Johnston (Papua New Guinea)
- Keaon Koloamatangi (Tonga)
- Apisai Koroisau (Fiji)
- Jeff Lima (Samoa)
- Peter Mamouzelos (Greece)
- Josh Mansour (Lebanon)
- Manase Manuokafoa (Tonga)
- Daryl Millard (Fiji)
- Taane Milne (Fiji)
- Sitiveni Moceidreke (Fiji)
- Michael Oldfield (Tonga)
- Eddie Paea (Tonga)
- Jaxson Paulo (Samoa)
- Hame Sele (Tonga)
- Latrell Siegwalt (France)
- Alan Skene (South Africa)
- Jaydn Su'A (Samoa)
- Fetuli Talanoa (Tonga)
- Tevita Tatola (Tonga)
- Lote Tuqiri (Fiji)
- Nigel Vagana (Samoa)

== Represented other countries before or after playing with South Sydney ==
The following players have represented other rugby league playing nations (i.e. other than Australia) either before or after they played for South Sydney.

- Fred Anderson (South Africa)
- Bob Banham (New Zealand)
- John Burke (Great Britain)
- Adam Doueihi (Lebanon)
- David Fa'alogo (Samoa)
- Joe Galuvao (New Zealand)
- Henderson Gill (Great Britain)
- Phil Howlett (Tonga)
- Lee Jackson (Great Britain)
- Filimone Lolohea (Tonga)
- Bernie Lowther (New Zealand)
- Willie Manu (Tonga)
- Darren Maroon (Lebanon)
- Martin Masella (Tonga)
- Mark Minichiello (Italy)
- Eddy Pettybourne (Samoa, United States)
- Gary Price (Great Britain)
- Frank Puletua (Samoa)
- Ian Rubin (Russia)
- Sean Skelton (South Africa)
- James Storer (Fiji)
- Craig Smith (New Zealand)

== Australian Test Captains ==
- Arthur Hennessy (1908)
- Clive Churchill (1950–1955)
- John Sattler (1969–1970)
- Bob McCarthy (1973)

== New Zealand Test Captains ==
- Roy Asotasi (2007–2008)

== Australian World Cup Captains ==
- Clive Churchill (1954)
- Ron Coote (1970)

== State representatives ==
=== Prior to State of Origin ===
The following players have represented New South Wales in rugby league whilst playing for South Sydney.

- Tommy Anderson
- Jim Armstrong
- Tom Barry
- Alf Blair
- Cec Blinkhorn
- Ray Branighan
- Frank Brogan
- Os Brown
- Arthur Butler
- Harry Butler
- Billy Cann
- Alby Carr
- Harry Cavanough
- Clive Churchill
- Michael Cleary
- Arthur Conlin
- Ron Coote
- Les Cowie
- Jack Coxon
- Ron Crowe
- Frank Curran
- Jim Davis
- Jim Deeley
- Denis Donoghue
- Col Donohoe
- Johnny Dougherty
- Terry Fahey
- Fred Felsch
- Harry Finch
- Ed Fry
- Martin Gallagher
- Herb Gilbert
- Bill Gillespie
- Bob Grant
- John Graves
- Dick Green
- Howard Hallett
- Gary Hambly
- Ernie Hammerton
- Sid Harris
- Greg Hawick
- Arthur Hennessy
- Eddie Hilliard
- Bob Honan
- Clarrie Horder
- Harold Horder
- Bob Honeysett
- Brian James
- Dick Johnson
- Harry Kadwell
- Clem Kennedy
- John Kerwick
- Ernie Lapham
- Vic Lawrence
- Eric Lewis
- John Leveson
- Pat Maher
- Don Manson
- Arthur McCabe
- Bob McCarthy
- Ted McGrath
- Ian Moir
- Jim Morgan
- Jack Morrison
- Pat Murphy
- Fred Nelson
- Alf O'Connor
- Frank O'Connor
- John O'Neill
- Arthur Oxford
- George Piggins
- Denis Pittard
- Bernie Purcell
- Alan Quinlivan
- Oscar Quinlivan
- Jack Rayner
- Alan Righton
- Eddie Root
- John Rosewell
- Paul Sait
- John Sattler
- Vince Sheehan
- Eric Simms
- Bill Spence
- Albert Spillane
- Gary Stevens
- Frank Storie
- Johnno Stuntz
- Jim Tait
- Ron Taylor
- Hash Thompson
- George Treweek
- Benny Wearing
- Elwyn Walters
- Dave Watson
- Jack Why
- Percy Williams

=== State of Origin ===
The following players have represented either New South Wales or Queensland in State of Origin rugby league whilst playing for South Sydney.

New South Wales

- David Boyle
- Tim Brasher
- Mark Carroll
- Damien Cook
- Angus Crichton
- Les Davidson
- Mario Fenech
- Bryan Fletcher
- Gary Hambly
- Keaon Koloamatangi
- Graham Lyons
- Tony Melrose
- Nathan Merritt
- Latrell Mitchell
- Cameron Murray
- Ziggy Niszczot
- Tony Rampling
- Adam Reynolds
- Cody Walker
- Craig Wing

Queensland

- Mitch Brennan
- Michael Crocker
- Dane Gagai
- Ashley Harrison
- Greg Inglis
- Ethan Lowe
- Chris McQueen
- Julian O'Neill
- Jaydn Su'A
- David Taylor
- Ben Te'o

== Captains (since 1908) ==
- Arthur Hennessy (1908, 1910)
- Arthur Butler (1908–1909, 1911–1915)
- John Rosewell (1908)
- Harry Butler (1908–1909)
- Arthur Conlin (1908–1910)
- Jack Leveson (1910)
- Billy Cann (1911)
- Bill Spence (1911)
- Howard Hallett (1915, 1918–1919, 1922)
- Roy Almond (1916–1917)
- Rex Norman (1916)
- George McGowan(1917)
- Arthur Oxford (1918–1921)
- John Kerwick (1919)
- Bill Rowley (1919)
- Cec Blinkhorn (1919)
- Alf Blair (1922–1930)
- Bill Gillespie (1923)
- Harold Horder (1924)
- Jack Lawrence (1924)
- Vic Lawrence (1925)
- Jim Breen (1927)
- Pat Maher (1931)
- George Treweek (1932–1934)
- Percy Williams (1935)
- Eric Lewis (1935–1937)
- Fred Felsch (1938–1944)
- Jack Walsh (1944)
- Clem Kennedy (1945–1946)
- Howard Hallett Jnr (1946)
- Jack Rayner (1947–1956)
- Clive Churchill (1957–1958)
- Bernie Purcell (1959–1960)
- Darrel Chapman (1961–1964)
- Jimmy Lisle (1963–1966)
- John Sattler (1967–1972)
- Bob McCarthy (1973–1975)
- Denis Pittard (1973)
- Bob Grant (1974)
- Gary Stevens (1974, 1976)
- George Piggins (1977)
- Paul Sait (1977–1978)
- Darryl Bampton (1978)
- Nathan Gibbs (1979–1982)
- Ken Stewart (1978–1981)
- Mitch Brennan (1981)
- Ziggy Niszczot (1983–1984)
- Mario Fenech (1985–1990)
- Craig Coleman (1991)
- Michael Andrews (1992–1993)
- Dean Schifilliti (1994)
- Lee Jackson (1995)
- Craig Field (1995–1996)
- Craig Salvatori (1996)
- Sean Garlick (1997–1999)
- Adam Muir (2002)
- Bryan Fletcher (2003–2005)
- Ashley Harrison (2005)
- Peter Cusack (2006–2007)
- David Kidwell (2007–2008)
- Roy Asotasi (2007–2012)
- John Sutton (2008, 2011–2019)
- Luke Stuart (2009–2010)
- Michael Crocker (2011–2013)
- Matt King (2012)
- Sam Burgess (2012–2013, 2017–2019)
- Greg Inglis (2015–2019)
- Adam Reynolds (2015, 2020–2021)
- Cody Walker (2021)
- Mark Nicholls (2021)
- Cameron Murray (2022–)
- Bronson Garlick (2026-)

== George Piggins Medal ==
Since 2003 the South Sydney Rabbitohs have awarded the "George Piggins Medal" to their best and fairest player of the season.

- 2003: Bryan Fletcher
- 2004: Ashley Harrison
- 2005: Peter Cusack
- 2006: David Fa'alogo
- 2007: Roy Asotasi
- 2008: Luke Stuart
- 2009: John Sutton
- 2010: Issac Luke
- 2011: Nathan Merritt
- 2012: John Sutton
- 2013: Greg Inglis & John Sutton
- 2014: Sam Burgess
- 2015: Greg Inglis
- 2016: Sam Burgess

== South Sydney "Dream Team" ==
The South Sydney Rabbitohs' greatest club side in history, the "South Sydney Dream Team", was announced in Sydney on 29 July 2004. The team consists of 17 players and a coach representing the South Sydney Rabbitohs Football Club from 1908 through to 2004.

The team spans the history of the code of rugby league in Australia and has collectively played 2,135 first grade games for the South Sydney Rabbitohs, 158 games for New South Wales, 3 games for Queensland and 158 Tests for Australia.

The "South Sydney Dream Team" is:

- Fullback – Clive Churchill (164 games for Souths between 1947 and 1958, 27 games for NSW, 34 Tests for Australia. Coached Souths to four premierships in 1967, 1968, 1970 and 1971).
- Winger – Harold Horder (86 games for Souths between 1912 and 1919 & 1924, 9 games for NSW, 13 Tests for Australia).
- Centre – Herb Gilbert (23 games for Souths between 1911 and 1912 & 1915, 3 games for NSW, 7 Tests for Australia).
- Centre – Paul Sait (163 games for Souths between 1968 and 1978, 5 games for NSW, 7 Tests for Australia).
- Winger – Ian Moir (118 games for Souths between 1952 and 1958, 10 games for NSW, 8 Tests for Australia).
- Five-eighth – Jimmy Lisle (102 games for Souths between 1962 and 1968, 8 games for NSW, 6 Tests for Australia).
- Halfback – Bob Grant (136 games for Souths between 1966 and 1975, 2 games for NSW, 1 Test for Australia).
- Lock – Ron Coote (151 games for Souths between 1964 and 1971, 13 games for NSW, 13 Tests for Australia).
- Second Row – Bob McCarthy (211 games for Souths between 1963 and 1975 & 1978, 10 games for NSW, 10 Tests for Australia).
- Second Row – George Treweek (120 games for Souths between 1926 and 1934, 7 games for NSW, 18 Tests for Australia).
- Prop – John O'Neill (150 games for Souths between 1965 and 1971 & 1975–76, 5 games for NSW, 2 Tests for Australia).
- Hooker – Elwyn Walters (129 games for Souths between 1967 and 1973, 11 games for NSW, 12 Tests for Australia).
- Prop – John Sattler (Captain, 195 games for Souths between 1963 and 1972, 4 games for NSW, 3 games for Queensland, 4 Tests for Australia).
- Reserve – Greg Hawick (84 games for Souths between 1950 and 1956, 8 games for NSW, 6 Tests for Australia).
- Reserve – Ray Branighan (52 games for Souths between 1968 and 1971, 5 games for NSW, 8 Tests for Australia).
- Reserve – Ian Roberts (65 games for Souths between 1986 and 1989, 11 games for NSW, 13 Tests for Australia).
- Reserve – Les Cowie (176 games for Souths between 1947 and 1957, 10 games for NSW, 6 Tests for Australia).
- Coach – Jack Rayner (Played 194 games for Souths between 1946 and 1957, 11 games for NSW, 5 Tests for Australia. Coached Souths to five premierships in 1950, 1951, 1953, 1954 and 1955).

== "The Magnificent XIII" ==
In 2002 on the Rabbitohs readmission to the competition, The Magnificent XIII, a team consisting of great South Sydney players over the years was selected by a panel of rugby league journalists and former Souths players and coaches. The team consists of 17 players (four being reserves) and a coach representing the South Sydney Rabbitohs Football Club from 1908 through to 2002.

South Sydney Rabbitohs – The Magnificent XIII
Starting XIII	Reserves	Coaching staff
1 Clive Churchill – FB (c); 2 Harold Horder – WG; 3 Ray Branighan – CE; 4 Paul Sait – CE; 5 Ian Moir – WG; 6 Alf Blair – FE; 7 Bob Grant – HB; 8 John Sattler – PR; 9 George Piggins – HK; 10 John O'Neill – PR; 11 Jack Rayner – SR; 12 Bob McCarthy – SR; 13 Ron Coote – LK	14 Terry Fahey; 15 Ziggy Niszczot; 16 Elwyn Walters; 17 George Treweek	Head coach: Bernie Purcell; Legend: (c) Captain(s); (vc) Vice-captain(s); Updated: 31 October 2026; Source(s):
