= Frank Brogan (disambiguation) =

Frank Brogan (born 1953) is an American educator and politician.

Frank Brogan may also refer to:

- Frank Brogan (footballer) (1942–2021), Scottish professional footballer
- Frank Brogan (rugby league) (1903–1961), Australian rugby league footballer
