= Ken Brogan =

Australian rugby league player

Personal information
- Full name: Kenneth Brogan
- Born: 7 February 1927; Sydney, New South Wales, Australia
- Died: 2 February 2006 (aged 78); Sydney, New South Wales, Australia

Playing information
- Position: Centre, Halfback, Five-eighth
Club
Years	Team	Pld	T	G	FG	P
1948–53	South Sydney	77	13	29	0	97

Ken Brogan (1927–2006) was an Australian rugby league footballer who played in the 1940s and 1950s. He played for South Sydney in the New South Wales Rugby League (NSWRL) competition during the club's second golden era where they won 5 premierships from 7 grand final appearances between 1949 and 1955.

== Background ==
Brogan was the son of Frank Brogan who was a premiership winning player with South Sydney in the 1920s. Brogan was a ball boy with Souths before being graded by the club at the age of 16.

== Playing career ==
Brogan made his first grade debut for Souths in 1945. In the same year, the club finished last on the table winning only one game all season. The following year it did not get any better for Souths as they went the entire 1946 season without winning a game.

In 1949, Brogan made 19 appearances as Souths claimed the minor premiership and reached the grand final against St George. Brogan played in the match as Souths lost the grand final 19-12 with St George claiming their second premiership.

In 1952, Souths reached their 4th grand final in a row against Western Suburbs. Souths would lose the grand final 22-12 with Brogan playing at halfback. The match was remembered due to its controversy with claims the referee George Bishop had put a big wager on Wests winning the game. Souths claimed that they were denied two fair tries and Wests had scored one try off a blatant knock on.

Brogan played on in 1953, but missed out on playing in the club's premiership victory over St George as Ray Mason was chosen to play instead.

== Post playing ==
After retirement, Brogan became treasurer of the South Sydney club. He died on 2 February 2006.
