= Mark Christensen (rugby league) =

Australian rugby league footballer

Personal information
- Born: 19 April 1982 (age 44) Mackay, Queensland, Australia

Playing information
- Position: Wing
Club
Years	Team	Pld	T	G	FG	P
2004	South Sydney	1	0	0	0	0
- Source: As of 12 November 2019

Mark Christensen (born 19 April 1982) is an Australian former professional rugby league footballer who played in the 2000s. He played for South Sydney in the NRL competition.

== Playing career ==
Christensen began his playing career with Mackay in Queensland. He then moved to the Redcliffe Dolphins and played two years with them in the Queensland Cup.

In 2002, Christensen signed for St. George Illawarra and played two seasons for them in reserve grade before signing with South Sydney. Christensen made his first grade debut for South Sydney against the Wests Tigers in round 22 2004 which ended in a 56–6 loss at Leichhardt Oval.

Christensen was handed his debut after Souths player Ahmad Bajouri was badly injured in a car accident in the week leading up to the game. At the end of the 2004 NRL season, Christensen was released by Souths. In 2006, Christensen joined the Gateshead Thunder in England where he spent two seasons.
