= Alan Righton =

Australian rugby league footballer

Personal information
- Full name: Alexander Alan Righton
- Born: 18 February 1905 Redfern, New South Wales, Australia
- Died: 11 June 1982 (aged 77) Sydney, New South Wales, Australia

Playing information
- Position: Fullback
Club
Years	Team	Pld	T	G	FG	P
1925–31	South Sydney	74	4	6	1	26
1933–34	Newtown	21	1	12	0	27
	Total	95	5	18	1	53
Representative
Years	Team	Pld	T	G	FG	P
1927	New South Wales	1	0	0	1	2
1930	Queensland	1	1	0	0	3
1929	NSW City	1	0	0	0	0

Alexander Alan Righton (1905–1982) was an Australian rugby league footballer who played in the 1920s and 1930s.

== Background ==
Righton was born in Redfern, New South Wales on 18 February 1905.

== Playing career ==
Righton went on to become one of South Sydney Rabbitohs greatest fullbacks, and a premiership winner. Righton was a South's junior, and made his first grade debut in 1925.

He went on to play seven seasons with South Sydney between 1925 and 1931, and played in three premiership winning teams in 1925, 1926 and 1928. He represented N.S.W. City Firsts in 1929 and played for New South Wales on one occasion in 1927.

He later switched to Newtown and played three seasons with them between 1933 and 1935 before retiring.

Righton died on 11 June 1982, aged 77.
