= Bob Honeysett =

Australian rugby league footballer

Personal information
- Full name: Robert Henry Honeysett
- Born: 24 May 1934 Condobolin, New South Wales, Australia
- Died: 5 December 2017 (aged 83) Wyee, New South Wales

Playing information
- Position: Centre, Five-eighth
Club
Years	Team	Pld	T	G	FG	P
1954–57	South Sydney	52	26	0	0	78
1958–59	North Sydney	30	15	0	0	45
	Total	82	41	0	0	123
Representative
Years	Team	Pld	T	G	FG	P
1956–62	New South Wales	4	1	0	0	3
1956–62	NSW City	2	1	0	0	3
1962	NSW Country	1	0	0	0	0
- Source: As of 9 December 2022

Bob Honeysett (1933–2017) was an Australian professional rugby league footballer who played in the 1950s and 1960s. He played for South Sydney and North Sydney in the New South Wales Rugby League (NSWRL) competition.

== Playing career ==
Honeysett made his first-grade debut in round 7 of the 1954 NSWRL season against Parramatta, scoring a try in an 18-11 victory at Cumberland Oval. Honeysett made his first grade debut in round 7 of the 1954 NSWRL season against Parramatta scoring a try on debut during a 18-11 victory at Cumberland Oval. In 1955, Honeysett played the majority of the season including two of the club's finals matches but was left out of the grand final team that defeated Newtown due to a broken hand. In 1958, Honeysett joined North Sydney and played two seasons for the club. In 1960, he was captain-coach of the Young Cherrypickers.

== Representative career ==
Honeysett represented New South Wales on four occasions. In 1959, it was reported that he became the first Indigenous player to captain the New South Wales team. His last call up was earned whilst playing for the Wagga Magpies in 1962. Honeysett also represented New South Wales Country and City teams.
