= Ken Stewart (rugby league) =

English rugby league footballer

Personal information
- Full name: Kenneth Gordon Stewart
- Born: 9 September 1955 (age 69); Manchester, Lancashire, England

Playing information
- Position: Hooker
Club
| Years | Team | Pld | T | G | FG | P |
|---|---|---|---|---|---|---|
| 1977–83 | South Sydney | 145 | 6 | 0 | 0 | 18 |
| 1984–85 | Parramatta Eels | 28 | 0 | 0 | 0 | 0 |
| | Total | 173 | 6 | 0 | 0 | 18 |

Kenneth Gordon Stewart (born 9 September 1955) is an Australian former professional rugby league footballer who played for the South Sydney Rabbitohs and the Parramatta Eels.

== Biography ==
Manchester born Stewart was a regular fixture in the South Sydney first-grade side from 1977 to 1983, during which time he served as one of the club's captains. He amassed a total of 145 premiership games, with one finals appearance in 1980. Stewart, who played as a hooker, finished his career with two seasons at Parramatta.

Stewart remained involved in rugby league after retiring, coaching the Moss Vale Dragons in 1993 and 1994. He is a former CEO of the South Sydney Leagues Club.
