= Paul O'Brien (rugby league) =

Australian rugby league footballer

Personal information
- Full name: Paul O'Brien
- Born: Australia

Playing information
- Position: Centre
Club
| Years | Team | Pld | T | G | FG | P |
|---|---|---|---|---|---|---|
| 1977 | South Sydney | 7 | 1 | 0 | 0 | 3 |
| 1976–77 | Wakefield Trinity | 12 | 6 | 0 | 0 | 18 |
| | Total | 19 | 7 | 0 | 0 | 21 |
Representative
| Years | Team | Pld | T | G | FG | P |
| | City New South Wales |

Paul O'Brien is an Australian former professional rugby league footballer who played in the 1970s. He played at representative level for City New South Wales, and at club level for South Sydney Rabbitohs and Wakefield Trinity, as centre.

== Playing career ==
Paul O'Brien made his début for Wakefield Trinity during March 1976, and he played his last match for Wakefield Trinity during the 1976–77 season.
