= Nathan DeBartolo =

Australian rugby league footballer

Personal information
- Born: 16 April 1980 (age 46)

Playing information
- Position: Halfback, Hooker
Club
Years	Team	Pld	T	G	FG	P
2002	South Sydney	4	0	0	0	0

Nathan DeBartolo is an Australian former professional rugby league footballer who played in the 2000s. He played for South Sydney in the NRL competition.

== Background ==
Nathan DeBartolo played his junior rugby league for Bondi united in the easts competition before switching to zetland then played sg ball jersey flegg n reserve grade for the roosters, before signing with souths in the nrl 2002

== Playing career ==
DeBartolo played reserve grade for South Sydney's arch rivals the Sydney Roosters and captained the reserve team in 2001 before signing with Souths for the 2002 NRL season.

DeBartolo made his first grade for South Sydney in round 16 2002 against the Newcastle Knights at the Sydney Football Stadium with the match finishing in a 26-8 loss. DeBartolo played three further games for Souths, the last of which was a 54-0 loss against the Parramatta Eels at Parramatta Stadium in round 22 2002.

At the end of 2002, DeBartolo was released by South Sydney. He then went on to play for the Sydney Bulls in the Ron Massey Cup competition. In 2006, DeBartolo played in the club's grand final defeat against Newtown. At the end of 2006, DeBartolo signed for the Leigh Centurions in England.
