= Gary Hambly =

Australian rugby league footballer

Personal information
- Born: 18 April 1956 (age 69) Sydney, New South Wales, Australia

Playing information
- Height: 183 cm (6 ft 0 in)
- Weight: 95 kg (14 st 13 lb)
- Position: Prop
Club
Years	Team	Pld	T	G	FG	P
1979–83	South Sydney	88	7	0	0	23
1983–84	York
	Total	88	7	0	0	23
Representative
Years	Team	Pld	T	G	FG	P
1980	New South Wales	1	0	0	0	0
- Relatives: Brian Hambly (uncle)

Gary Hambly (born 18 April 1956) is an Australian former professional rugby league footballer who played in the 1970s and 1980s. He played for the South Sydney Rabbitohs in the New South Wales Rugby League (NSWRL) competition. He primarily played in the front row.

A Mascot junior, Hambly was selected to represent New South Wales in the front row for the inaugural State of Origin contest in 1980.

In late 1983, Hambly joined English club York for a season, and later played for the Wagga Magpies in the Country Rugby League competition.

Hambly is the cousin of former test forward, Brian Hambly.
