= Bill Owen (rugby league) =

Australian rugby league player

Personal information
- Full name: William Owen
- Born: 11 February 1936
- Died: 13 August 1996 (aged 60)

Playing information
- Position: Front-row / Second-row
Club
Years	Team	Pld	T	G	FG	P
1963–64	South Sydney	31	3	0	0	9
Representative
Years	Team	Pld	T	G	FG	P
1959–62	New South Wales	5	0	0	0	0
1962	Australia	1	0	0	0	0

William Owen (11 February 1936 – 13 August 1996) was an Australian rugby league player.

Known as "Bags", Owen was a prop and second-rower with North Newcastle.

Owen was uncapped for Kangaroos on their 1961 tour of New Zealand, before making his debut the following year against Great Britain at Lang Park, partnering Mick Veivers in the second row.

In 1963 and 1964, Owens played first-grade for South Sydney.
