= Damon Alley-Tovio =

Australian rugby league footballer

Personal information
- Born: 24 January 1984 (age 42)

Playing information
- Position: Wing
Club
Years	Team	Pld	T	G	FG	P
2003–04	South Sydney	4	0	0	0	0

Damon Alley-Tovio is an Australian former professional rugby league player. He played for the South Sydney Rabbitohs in the NRL.

== Background ==
Alley-Tovio was a South Sydney junior and holds the record for most tries in a Jersey Flegg game when he scored 6 tries against Balmain in the Jersey Flegg Cup.

== Playing career ==
Alley-Tovio made his first grade debut for South Sydney in round 10 2003 against Cronulla-Sutherland at Shark Park which ended in a 14–30 loss. Alley-Tovio played 2 further games for Souths in the 2003 NRL season as the club finished last on the table.

In the 2004 NRL season, Alley-Tovio only made one appearance for Souths which came against Canterbury-Bankstown in round 7 with the match finishing in an 8–34 loss. Souths would finish last on the table for a second consecutive year and this would prove to be Alley-Tovio's last game in the top grade.

After being released by Souths, Alley-Tovio played in reserve grade for the Canberra Raiders, St. George Illawarra, Newtown, Canterbury-Bankstown and Penrith.

== Controversy ==
In 2007, Alley-Tovio agreed to hand himself in to police after allegedly assaulting three men inside a hotel and fleeing in a stolen car. It was reported that a fight began at the Rydges Hotel in Parramatta after Alley-Tovio knocked over a tray of drinks. After a fight broke out, Alley-Tovio was ejected out of the hotel by security staff. He then allegedly ran across James Ruse Drive, dodging traffic, and got into a car which was pulled over with the keys in the ignition, but unoccupied. The car was later dumped outside Maroubra police station with the keys in the ignition. Alley-Tovio was suspended by his club Canterbury who he was playing with at the time and was subsequently released.
