= Pat Thornton (rugby league) =

Australian rugby league footballer

Playing information
- Position: Hooker
Club
Years	Team	Pld	T	G	FG	P
1947–53	Central Charlestown	?	?	?	?	?
1953	South Sydney	4	0	0	0	0
1954	Central Charlestown	?	?	?	?	?
	Total

Pat Thorton was an Australian professional rugby league footballer who played one season in the New South Wales Rugby League (NSWRL).

== Playing career ==
Playing in Newcastle's lower grades since 1947, Thornton was a successful player for the Central Charlestown Butcher Boys club at the hooker position. Prior to his first grade stint, Thornton was remembered for his rivalry with Bob Crane of the (now defunct) Northern Suburbs Bulldogs RLFC. He was also noted for his heavily aggressive play in scrums, leading to frequent scrum infringements, which consequently resulted in many penalty calls from the referees.

Thornton made his professional rugby league debut with South Sydney in the opening round of the 1953 season against the Western Suburbs Magpies. He made three more consecutive appearances for the club, before making his final first grade appearance in Round 4.

He retired from rugby league on 2 June 1954, citing that the weekly Saturday afternoon games were interfering with his work commitments. Thornton also stated he wanted to spend more time with family, although numerous pundits believed Thornton's decision to retire from the game occurred out of frustration and dissatisfaction from the referees' officiating around scrum penalties, especially after Central's game against the Western Suburbs Rosellas in May that year.
