= Steve O'Dea =

Australian rugby league footballer

Personal information
- Full name: Steve O'Dea
- Born: 28 March 1966 (age 58)

Playing information
- Position: Centre, Fullback
Club
Years	Team	Pld	T	G	FG	P
1988–92	South Sydney	28	3	0	0	12
1993	Western Suburbs	4	0	0	0	0
	Total	32	3	0	0	12

Steve O'Dea is an Australian former rugby league footballer who played in the 1980s and 1990s. He played for South Sydney and Western Suburbs in the New South Wales Rugby League (NSWRL) competition.

== Playing career ==
O'Dea made his first grade debut for Souths against Illawarra in round 19 1988 at WIN Stadium scoring a try in a 22–20 victory.

In 1989, O'Dea was part of the South Sydney side which won the minor premiership. O'Dea played in the club's preliminary final defeat against eventual premiers the Canberra Raiders at the Sydney Football Stadium.

The following year in 1990, O'Dea played 11 games as South Sydney finished bottom of the table managing to only win 2 games all year. O'Dea played with Souths until the end of 1992 before departing. He played a total of 146 games for the club across all grades.

O'Dea joined Western Suburbs in 1993 but only managed to make 4 appearances for Wests in his only season at the club.
