= Matt Riddle (rugby league) =

Australian rugby league footballer

Personal information
- Full name: Matthew Riddle
- Born: 18 March 1983 (age 42)

Playing information
- Position: Wing
Club
Years	Team	Pld	T	G	FG	P
2004	South Sydney	2	1	6	0	16

Matt Riddle (born 18 March 1983) is an Australian former professional rugby league footballer who played for the South Sydney Rabbitohs in the National Rugby League (NRL).

== Biography ==
Riddle, who grew up in the NSW north coast town of Lennox Head, started his career with Canterbury. He was a member of the Bulldogs' 2001 Jersey Flegg premiership winning team and scored the winning try in the grand final win over Cronulla. At the World Sevens in 2003 he was tournament's the leading point-scorer with 40 points, but didn't make a first-grade appearance while with the Canterbury club and left for South Sydney after that season.

In the 2004 NRL season he featured as a goal-kicking winger for South Sydney in the first two rounds of the season. On debut against the Sydney Roosters he scored a second half try and kicked two goals from five attempts, in a 10-point loss. The following round against the Wests Tigers he finished on the winning side courtesy of a golden point field goal by Willie Peters and scored from all four of his shots on goal, with two conversions and two penalties.
