= Jim Tait (rugby league) =

Australian rugby league footballer

Personal information
- Full name: Victor James Tait
- Born: 1904 Redfern, New South Wales, Australia
- Died: 24 April 1972 (aged 67–68)

Playing information
- Position: Five-eighth, Centre, Lock
Club
Years	Team	Pld	T	G	FG	P
1924–36	South Sydney	16	4	3	0	18
Representative
Years	Team	Pld	T	G	FG	P
1931	New South Wales	2	1	4	0	11

Coaching information
Club
Years	Team	Gms	W	D	L	W%
1941	South Sydney
- Source: As of 6 December 2022

Jim Tait was an Australian former professional rugby league footballer who played in the 1920s and 1930s. He played for the South Sydney in the New South Wales Rugby League (NSWRL) competition. He coached South Sydney Rabbitohs first grade from 1941- 1943 and later served on the club's board 1929-32, 1935-38 and 1957-72. Tait also served the Rabbitohs in many roles as an administrator, and he was one of 14 people who were the first to be inducted as Life Members of the South Sydney Football Club in 1962. His brother Alec, also played for the Rabbitohs.

== Playing career ==
Tait was a Redfern United junior and made his first grade debut for South Sydney in round 9 of the 1928 NSWRL season against North Sydney at North Sydney Oval.

== Representative career ==
Tait was selected by New South Wales in 1931 and played in two matches against Brisbane firsts and Toowoomba.
