= Ambrose Morgan =

Australian rugby league footballer

Personal information
- Born: 1947
- Died: 16 August 1975 (aged 29) Sydney, NSW, Australia

Playing information
- Height: 6 ft 1 in (185 cm)
- Weight: 16 st (224 lb; 102 kg)
- Position: Front rower
Club
Years	Team	Pld	T	G	FG	P
1975	South Sydney	3	0	0	0	0

Andrew Williams (1947 – 1975), better known as Ambrose Morgan, was an Australian rugby league footballer.

An Indigenous Australian, Morgan hailed from Redfern and was known locally as the "King of Redfern". He was a 16 stone front rower and outside of rugby league worked as a nightclub bouncer.

Morgan toured New Zealand with the Redfern All Blacks in 1973.

After impressing in the Amco Cup, Morgan got his opportunity to play first grade for the South Sydney Rabbitohs late in the 1975 NSWRFL season and took the field in three matches.

Morgan was killed in the early hours of 16 August 1975 while drinking with friends at the Kiwi Club on Quay Street. A man came into the club carrying a concealed sawn off .22 rifle under his poncho and shot Morgan in the chest, after calling out his name. It is believed to have been retribution for an earlier brawl Morgan had been involved in. The shooter was sentenced to seven years imprisonment for manslaughter.
