= David Sinclair (rugby league) =

Australian rugby league player

Personal information
- Born: 31 July 1957 (age 67)

Playing information
- Position: Halfback
Club
Years	Team	Pld	T	G	FG	P
1977–78, 1980–81	South Sydney	53	7	0	0	21

David Sinclair (born 31 July 1957) is an Australian former professional rugby league footballer. He played four seasons in the New South Wales Rugby League Premiership (NSWRFL) for South Sydney.

== Playing career ==
In 1977, Sinclair made his first grade debut with South Sydney off the bench in round 7. He started the following game against Cronulla-Sutherland at half-back. Two rounds later, he scored the first try of his career in a round 10 win over Newtown. In round 12, he scored a try in a 13-17 loss to Balmain. Sinclair scored in the final round of the season against Newtown, however Souths lost the game 20-33 and received their 11th straight loss.

Sinclair made 6 appearances in the 1978 season and did not play in 1979.

In 1980, Sinclair returned with South Sydney off the bench in round 5 against Newtown. He would not experience success until later in the season, when he scored a try in three consecutive games from Round 20 to Round 22. He played in the minor preliminary semi final, though South Sydney lost to the St. George Dragons.

Sinclair played 14 games in 1981. In Round 13, he scored the final try of his career in a win against St. George. Sinclair played his final NSWRL game in round 16 in a 10-13 loss to Balmain. He concluded his career with 7 tries from 53 games.
