= Bill Rowley (rugby league) =

Australian rugby league footballer

Personal information
- Full name: William Kimpton Rowley
- Born: 17 July 1889

Playing information
- Position: Centre
Club
Years	Team	Pld	T	G	FG	P
1915–19	South Sydney	17	1	0	0	3
- Source: As of 2 December 2022

Bill Rowley was an Australian former professional rugby league footballer who played in the 1910s. He played for the South Sydney in the New South Wales Rugby League (NSWRL) competition.

== Playing career ==
Rowley made his first grade debut for South Sydney in round 10 of the 1915 NSWRL season against Annandale which ended in a 3-2 loss at Erskineville Oval. In 1918, Rowley played 12 games for Souths as they won the 1918 premiership. Rowley then joined the South Sydney squad for their tour of Queensland in the same season. Rowley's final game for South Sydney was in round 9 of the 1919 NSWRL season against Annandale which Souths won 18-10 at Wentworth Park.
