= Jim Breen (rugby league) =

Australian rugby league player

Personal information
- Full name: James Breen
- Born: 13 February 1899 Waterloo, New South Wales
- Died: 29 September 1957 (aged 58)

Playing information
- Position: Halfback, Five-eighth
Club
Years	Team	Pld	T	G	FG	P
1924–28	South Sydney	11	4	0	0	12

Jim Breen was an Australian rugby league footballer who played in the 1920s. He played for South Sydney in the NSWRL competition during the club's first golden era where Souths won 7 premierships in 8 seasons.

== Background ==
Breen was born in Waterloo, New South Wales, Australia and played his junior rugby league for Mascot before being signed by Souths.

== Playing career ==
Breen made his first grade debut for South Sydney against University in Round 8 1924 at the Sydney Cricket Ground.

In 1928, Breen captained Souths in the 1928 NSWRL grand final against arch rivals Eastern Suburbs which was played at the Royal Agricultural Society Grounds. Souths would win the match in convincing fashion by a score of 26-5 claiming their 4th premiership in a row.

The 1928 NSWRL grand final would be Breen's last game in the top grade. Overall, Breen played a total of 113 matches across all grades for Souths scoring 46 tries and kicking 23 goals. Breen retired at the end of the 1930 season.
