= Greg McMillan =

Australian rugby player (born 1938)

Personal information
- Born: 11 July 1938 (age 86)

Playing information
- Position: Wing
Club
Years	Team	Pld	T	G	FG	P
1962–65	South Sydney	32	8	94	0	212
Representative
Years	Team	Pld	T	G	FG	P
1962	NSW Country Firsts	1	0	6	0	12

Greg McMillan (born 11 July 1938) is an Australian former professional rugby league footballer who played for the South Sydney Rabbitohs.

McMillan, a winger from Lithgow, represented the NSW Country Firsts in 1962. He transferred to South Sydney during the 1962 NSWRFL season and played first-grade until 1965, during which time he was the club's goal-kicker.

Since the 1970s, he has lived in the Albury-Wodonga region.
