= Stuart Coupland =

Australian rugby league footballer

Personal information
- Full name: Stuart Coupland
- Born: 14 February 1972 (age 53)

Playing information
- Position: Second-row, Prop
Club
Years	Team	Pld	T	G	FG	P
1993	South Sydney	5	0	0	0	0
1994	Western Suburbs	1	0	0	0	0
	Total	6	0	0	0	0
- Source: As of 23 December 2022

Stuart Coupland is an Australian former professional rugby league footballer who played in the 1990s. He played for Western Suburbs and South Sydney in the NSWRL/ARL competition.

== Playing career ==
A St. George junior, Coupland made his first grade debut for South Sydney in round 1 of the 1993 NSWRL season against the Illawarra Steelers at WIN Stadium. Coupland played from the interchange bench in a 19–0 loss. Coupland played a further four games for South Sydney throughout the season. In 1994, Coupland joined Western Suburbs and played one match for the club, a 36–10 loss against Cronulla-Sutherland in round 4 of the competition.
