= Steve Walsh (rugby league) =

Australian rugby league footballer

Personal information
- Full name: Stephen Walsh
- Born: 13 April 1958 (age 68)

Playing information

Rugby union
Club
Years	Team	Pld	T	G	FG	P
197?–7?	Randwick

Rugby league
- Position: Fullback
Club
Years	Team	Pld	T	G	FG	P
1980–83	South Sydney	58	12	35	0	106

Steve Walsh (born 13 April 1958) is an Australian former professional rugby league footballer who played for the South Sydney Rabbitohs.

== Biography ==
Walsh, who went to Marcellin College, played rugby union for Randwick in the late 1970s.

A full-back, Walsh played first-grade with South Sydney from 1980 to 1983. During his career he made a total of 58 premiership appearances, which included the 1980 finals series. He was a member of South Sydney's 1981 Tooth Cup premiership winning team and was Man of the Match in the grand final win over Cronulla.

He now lives in Pittsburgh, Pennsylvania, U.S.A.
