= Ernie Lapham =

Australian rugby league footballer

- Ernie Lapham, 1921

Personal information
- Full name: Ernest Frederick Lapham
- Born: 2 July 1901; Sydney, New South Wales, Australia
- Died: 19 September 2000 (aged 99); Redcliffe, Queensland, Australia

Playing information
- Position: Second-row, Lock
Club
Years	Team	Pld	T	G	FG	P
1921–24	St. George	50	9	0	0	27
1925–28	South Sydney	35	36	1	0	110
1929	St. George	5	2	0	0	6
	Total	90	47	1	0	143
Representative
Years	Team	Pld	T	G	FG	P
1922–28	New South Wales	13	5	4	0	23
1922–27	Metropolis	3	3	0	0	9
1928	NSW City	1	2	0	0	6

Ernest Frederick 'Ernie' Lapham (/ˈlæfəm/;) (1901–2000) was an Australian rugby league footballer who played in the 1920s.

== Playing career ==
Known as 'Curly', Lapham was born in Sydney on 2 July 1901. Lapham was a St. George junior from Hurstville, New South Wales who became a foundation player with St. George, He played in the club's first ever match against Glebe on 23 April 1921.

Lapham stayed at the St. George club for four seasons between 1921 and 1924, and then moved to South Sydney during their golden era of 1925–1928. He played 11 games for Souths in the 1925 season as they went undefeated and won the premiership without the need to contest a grand final. Despite being at Souths until the end of 1928, Lapham was not included in the grand final sides of 1926, 1927 and 1928.

He then returned to St. George for his final season in 1929.

Lapham also represented New South Wales on eight occasions between 1926 and 1928.

== Death ==
Lapham was regarded as the last surviving member of St. George's foundation team when he died in 2000. Lapham died on 19 September 2000, in his 100th year at Redcliffe, Queensland.
