= Michael Andrews (rugby league) =

Australian rugby league footballer (born 1962)

Personal information
- Full name: Michael John Andrews
- Born: 18 March 1962 (age 63)

Playing information
- Position: Second-row, Lock
Club
Years	Team	Pld	T	G	FG	P
1984–93	South Sydney	181	21	7	0	98

Michael Andrews (born 1962) is an Australian former rugby league footballer, a lock forward who played in the late 1980s and early 1990s and captained the South Sydney in the New South Wales Rugby League (NSWRL) competition.

== Playing career ==
Andrews made his first grade debut for South Sydney against Parramatta in round 3 of the 1984 season at Redfern Oval. Andrews played in both of South Sydney's finals games in that season. Andrews played for Souths in their subsequent finals campaigns in 1986, 1987 and 1989, the latter of which is when the club claimed the minor premiership.

In 1990, Andrews only made 2 appearances as Souths suffered one of their worst seasons on the field and also one of the worst form slumps as they went from minor premiers to wooden spooners. Andrews played with Souths until the end of 1993. His last three seasons at Souths saw the club finish 14th three years in a row.

He played in 181 games for South Sydney between 1984 and 1993, scoring 21 tries and kicking 7 goals (98 points).

== Sources ==
- The Encyclopaedia of Rugby League Players – South Sydney Rabbitohs, Alan Whiticker & Glen Hudson, Bas Publishing, 2005.
