= Craig Weeks =

Craig Weeks is an Australian former professional rugby league footballer. He played three seasons for the South Sydney Rabbitohs of the New South Wales Rugby League Premiership from 1986 to 1989.

== Playing career ==
Weeks made his professional rugby league debut off the bench in Round 13 of the 1986 season against the Balmain Tigers. In Round 19, he was given a starting role as a hooker. He scored the first and last try of his career the following round in a 38-14 win over the North Sydney Bears. Weeks was reverted to the bench the following match.

Weeks made 4 more appearances in 1987. South Sydney qualified for the Semi-Finals for the second straight season, however Weeks did not play.

He did not play in 1988, however he would return the following year off the bench in Round 19 against the Illawarra Steelers. This turned out to be the final game of his career. Weeks retired with 1 try from 9 appearances.
