= Gerald Symonds =

Australian rugby league footballer

Personal information
- Full name: Gerald Symonds
- Born: 7 December 1976 (age 49)

Playing information
- Position: Prop
Club
Years	Team	Pld	T	G	FG	P
2002	South Sydney Rabbitohs	2	0	0	0	0

Gerald Symonds (born 7 December 1976) is an Australian former rugby league footballer who played in the 2000s. He played for the South Sydney Rabbitohs. His position of choice was prop.

== Playing career ==
A Moore Park junior, Symonds was graded by the South Sydney Rabbitohs in 1996. He had to wait six more years until the age of 25 before making his first grade debut which was from the bench in his side's 54−0 loss to the Parramatta Eels at the Sydney Football Stadium in round 22 of the 2002 season. He played only one more game of first grade which was in his side's 58−16 loss to the St. George Illawarra Dragons at WIN Stadium the following week. Symonds was released by the Rabbitohs at the end of the 2003 season, and subsequently never played first grade rugby league again.

Symonds later played for the Newtown Jets in the NSWRL Premier League competition.
