= Dennis Beecraft =

Australian rugby league footballer

Personal information
- Born: 5 May 1968 (age 58) Sydney, New South Wales, Australia

Playing information
- Position: Second-row, Prop
Club
Years	Team	Pld	T	G	FG	P
1988–93	Eastern Suburbs	32	4	0	0	16
1994–95	South Sydney	8	1	0	0	4
1996–98	Wakefield Trinity	16	2	0	0	8
	Total	56	7	0	0	28

Dennis Beecraft (born 5 May 1968) is an Australian former professional rugby league footballer who played in the 1980s, and 1990s. He spent most of his career at the Eastern Suburbs club. His position of choice was second row. Beecraft also played for the South Sydney Rabbitohs as well as for Wakefield Trinity.

== Playing career ==
Beecraft was a schoolboy rugby union representative with the Sydney Combined High Schools side. He was graded by the Eastern Suburbs Roosters in 1987, and made his first grade début in round 20 of the 1988 season against the Gold Coast Giants at Seagulls Stadium. He scored a try on début in his side's 38-14 demolition of the Giants. Beecraft was a large and 'fiery' second row forward, but he possessed skill and some pace. Beecraft's career was plagued with injuries. Despite playing six seasons with the Roosters, he only managed to make 32 appearances for them. His stint at the Roosters ended at the conclusion of the 1993 season.

In 1994, Beecraft joined the South Sydney Rabbitohs. Injuries would further hamper his career once again. In his two seasons with the Rabbitohs, Beecraft only made 8 appearances. He left the Rabbitohs at the conclusion of the 1995 season. He finished his career with English Super League club Wakefield Trinity.

== Sources ==
- Whitticker, Alan; Hudson, Glen (2007). The Encyclopedia of Rugby League Players. Gary Allen Ltd. p. 609. ISBN 978-1-877082-93-1.
