= Roy Beiber =

Australian rugby league footballer (1901-1955)

Personal information
- Full name: Roy Francis Beiber
- Born: 30 August 1901 Redfern, New South Wales, Australia
- Died: 21 May 1955 (aged 53) Redfern, New South Wales, Australia

Playing information
- Position: Prop, Second-row
Club
Years	Team	Pld	T	G	FG	P
1922	St. George	1	0	0	0	0
1924–26	South Sydney	5	0	0	0	0
	Total	6	0	0	0	0

Roy Francis Beiber (1901-1955) was an Australian rugby league footballer who played in the 1920s.

== Playing career ==
Former teenage Sydney boxer, Roy Beiber (or Bieber) was a South Sydney junior who came to the St. George club for one season in 1922. He re-joined South Sydney in 1924 and stayed for three seasons before retiring.

Roy Beiber won a Reserve Grade premiership with the South Sydney Rabbitohs on 18 Sep 1926.

== Death ==
Beiber died on 21 May 1955.
