= Steve Sydenham =

Australian rugby league footballer

Playing information
- Position: Centre, winger
Club
Years	Team	Pld	T	G	FG	P
1978–79	South Sydney	4	0	0	0	0
1980	Eastern Suburbs	3	1	2	0	7
	Total	7	1	2	0	7

Steve Sydenham is a former Australian professional rugby league player. A centre and winger, he played seven matches in the NSWRFL for South Sydney (1978–79) and the Eastern Suburbs (1980).
