= Bob Gehrke =

Australian rugby league player

Personal information
- Full name: Robert Leslie Gehrke
- Born: 25 April 1938
- Died: 18 September 2007 (aged 69)

Playing information
- Height: 5 ft 7 in (170 cm)
- Weight: 12 st (168 lb; 76 kg)
- Position: Hooker
Club
Years	Team	Pld	T	G	FG	P
1962–63	South Sydney	4	0	0	0	0
Representative
Years	Team	Pld	T	G	FG	P
1958–61	Queensland	8	2	0	0	6
1961	Australia

Robert Leslie Gehrke (25 April 1938 – 18 September 2007) was an Australian rugby league player.

A hooker, Gehrke played with Brisbane Valleys and Redcliffe in his native Queensland. He gained a national call up in 1961 for a tour of New Zealand, but was unable to displace Ian Walsh as Test hooker and featured in only the minor matches. In 1962, Gehrke transferred to South Sydney, where had the misfortune of breaking an ankle on his first-grade debut, and subsequently received limited opportunities.

Gehrke served as an Australia Army corporal and was based for a time in Papua New Guinea.
