= Mark Lyons (rugby league) =

Australian rugby league footballer

Personal information
- Full name: Mark Lyons
- Born: 31 March 1965 (age 59)

Playing information
- Position: Prop
Club
| Years | Team | Pld | T | G | FG | P |
|---|---|---|---|---|---|---|
| 1989–91 | South Sydney | 29 | 5 | 0 | 0 | 20 |
| 1992 | St. George Dragons | 3 | 0 | 0 | 0 | 0 |
| 1993 | Ryedale-York | 15 | 1 | 0 | 0 | 4 |
| | Total | 47 | 6 | 0 | 0 | 24 |

Mark Lyons is an Australian former rugby league footballer who played in the 1980s and 1990s. He played for South Sydney and St. George in the New South Wales Rugby League (NSWRL) competition and for Ryedale-York in England.

== Playing career ==
Lyons made his first grade debut for South Sydney in round 9 of the 1989 season against Western Suburbs at Campbelltown Stadium. Lyons made 13 appearances for Souths in his debut year as the club won the minor premiership and were one of the favourites to win the competition. Lyons played in the club's preliminary final defeat against the Canberra Raiders at the Sydney Football Stadium.

The following season, Lyons played 10 games for Souths as the club endured a horror season on and off the field after finishing last. Souths managed to win only 2 games for the entire campaign. In Lyons last year at Souths, the club finished in a disappointing 14th place on the table.

In 1992, Lyons joined St George but was limited to only 3 games for the club. Lyons did not play in St George's grand final loss against the Brisbane Broncos. In 1993, Lyons signed with English side Ryedale-York who were later known as the York Wasps. Lyons spent one year in England before returning to Australia.
