= Shane Day (rugby league) =

Australian rugby league footballer

Personal information
- Full name: Shane Day
- Born: 3 August 1949 (age 76)

Playing information
- Position: Hooker, Second-row
Club
Years	Team	Pld	T	G	FG	P
1969–70	South Sydney	1	0	0	0	0
1973–78	Western Suburbs	84	1	0	0	3
	Total	85	1	0	0	3
Representative
Years	Team	Pld	T	G	FG	P
1972	NSW Country	1	0	0	0	0
- Source: As of 8 July 2019

Shane Day (born 3 August 1949) is an Australian former rugby league footballer who played in the 1960s and 1970s. He played for Western Suburbs and South Sydney in the New South Wales Rugby League (NSWRL) competition.

== Playing career ==
Day made his first grade debut for South Sydney in 1969 but only managed one first grade appearance over two seasons at the club. In 1972, Day was selected to play for NSW Country against NSW City.

In 1973, Day was recruited by Western Suburbs and became a regular feature in the side. Day missed out on playing in the club's 1974 preliminary final defeat against Eastern Suburbs. In 1978, Day was part of the Western Suburbs side which won the minor premiership under new coach Roy Masters who turned Wests from also-rans to a competitive force.

Day played in both of Western Suburbs finals games which were a 14–10 defeat against Cronulla-Sutherland and the preliminary final defeat against Manly-Warringah. The loss to Manly would also be Day's final game and he retired at the end of 1978.
