= Ted McGrath (rugby league) =

Australian rugby league player

Personal information
- Full name: Edward McGrath
- Born: 1893 or 1894

Playing information
- Position: Forward
Club
Years	Team	Pld	T	G	FG	P
1920–22	South Sydney	35	5	2	0	19
Representative
Years	Team	Pld	T	G	FG	P
1918–25	Queensland	8	0	0	0	0
1921	Australasia	1	0	0	0	0

Edward J. McGrath was an Australian rugby league player.

Known by the nickname "Deadwood", McGrath was a versatile forward and played much of his rugby league in Brisbane with the Valleys club, which he captained prior to his arrival at South Sydney in 1920. He had three first-grade seasons for South Sydney before returning to Queensland.

McGrath was a member of the Australasian squad for the 1921–22 tour of Great Britain, as the sole South Sydney representative. He didn't feature in any of the Test matches against Great Britain, but still put together 16 tour appearances, which included their win over Wales in Pontypridd.
