= Michael Moran (rugby league) =

Australian rugby league footballer

Mick Moran
Personal information
- Full name: Michael Moran
- Born: 16 August 1983 (age 41)

Playing information
- Position: Halfback
Club
Years	Team	Pld	T	G	FG	P
2005–2006	South Sydney	11	2	0	0	8
- Source: As of 1 May 2020

Michael "Mick" Moran (born 16 August 1983) is a former rugby league player. He played for the South Sydney Rabbitohs.

== NRL career ==
Moran debuted in the 2005 season, in South Sydney's round 9 match against the St. George Illawarra Dragons. He showed promise in his first season, playing 11 games, and signed on to another contract until the end of 2007 midway through the year. However, he failed to play a single game in the 2006 season. His contract was terminated midway through the 2006 season more than a year before it was due to expire for unspecified disciplinary reasons.

== Newcastle Rugby League career ==
Moran later signed on with the Maitland Pickers in the Newcastle Rugby League, winning two Grand Finals with them, in 2010 and 2011. Special attention was drawn to his performance in the 2011 Grand Final, where he kicked the winning field goal during Golden point. He later moved to the Macquarie Scorpions. Moran retired from rugby league prior to the 2016 season.
