= Frank Crowe (rugby league) =

Playing information
- Position: Hooker
Club
Years	Team	Pld	T	G	FG	P
1928	South Sydney	2	0	0	0	0
1933	South Sydney	6	0	0	0	0
	Total	8	0	0	0	0

Frank Crowe was an Australian rugby league footballer of the 1930s. He played two brief seasons in the New South Wales Rugby League Premiership for South Sydney.

== Playing career ==
In 1928, Crowe made his professional rugby league debut against University in a Round 3 win. He played the following game in a 7-9 loss to Eastern Suburbs and would not appear again until 1933.

Returning at his usual position as hooker, Crowe made an appearance for the first time in five years in a double-digit loss to Easts. He played 3 more games in the regular season. South Sydney concluded the season 3rd, below Easts (who also had 8 wins, but had a better point differential). Souths played Newtown in the semi-final on a Saturday afternoon. Crowe played the game, however, his team lost 17-12 to the eventual premiers.

Crowe would not play another game after Souths' Semi Final loss. He concluded his career with 8 appearances.
