= Les Arthur =

Australian rugby league footballer (1894-1967)

Personal information
- Born: 22 November 1894
- Died: 11 September 1967 (aged 72)

Playing information
Club
Years	Team	Pld	T	G	FG	P
1918–19	South Sydney	2	2	0	0	6
1920	Eastern Suburbs	4	1	0	0	3
	Total	6	3	0	0	9

Les Arthur was a professional rugby league footballer in the Australian competition the New South Wales Rugby League (NSWRL).

Arthur played for both the South Sydney in 1918 and the Eastern Suburbs club in the 1920 seasons.
