= Bill Tijou =

Australian rugby league footballer

Personal information
- Full name: William Harman Tijou
- Born: 1890
- Died: 10 October 1962; Perth, Western Australia

Playing information
- Position: Second-row, Lock
Club
| Years | Team | Pld | T | G | FG | P |
|---|---|---|---|---|---|---|
| 1915 | South Sydney | 1 | 0 | 0 | 0 | 0 |
| 1917–20 | Eastern Suburbs | 21 | 0 | 0 | 0 | 0 |
| | Total | 22 | 0 | 0 | 0 | 0 |
- Source: Whitiker/Hudson

William Tijou (Australia) was a rugby league footballer in the New South Wales Rugby League (NSWRL) from the 1910s.

Tijou, a forward was graded at Souths in 1912. He also played with Eastern Suburbs in the (1917–20) seasons.
