= Bill Cameron (rugby league) =

Australian rugby league footballer

Personal information
- Full name: William Cameron

Playing information
- Position: Prop, Second-row, Hooker
Club
Years	Team	Pld	T	G	FG	P
1917	South Sydney	2	0	0	0	0
1920–21	Eastern Suburbs	21	5	0	0	15
1922–23	South Sydney	22	4	0	0	12
	Total	45	9	0	0	27
- Source: As of 2 December 2022

Bill Cameron was an Australian former professional rugby league footballer who played in the 1910s and 1920s. He played for the South Sydney and Eastern Suburbs in the New South Wales Rugby League (NSWRL) competition.

== Playing career ==
Cameron made his first grade debut for South Sydney in round 2 of the 1917 NSWRL season against Annandale at Wentworth Park. In 1920, Cameron joined arch-rivals Eastern Suburbs. Cameron spent two seasons at Eastern Suburbs before returning to South Sydney. Cameron spent two final years at South Sydney with his final game for the club being a 28-5 loss against St. George in round 8 of the 1923 NSWRL season.
