= Jim Deeley =

Australian rugby league footballer

Jim Deely
Personal information
- Full name: James Francis William Deely

Playing information
- Position: Halfback, Five-eighth, Wing
Club
Years	Team	Pld	T	G	FG	P
1929	Glebe	9	2	0	0	6
1931–34	South Sydney	37	7	0	0	21
	Total	46	9	0	0	27
Representative
Years	Team	Pld	T	G	FG	P
1932	New South Wales	1	0	0	0	0
1932	Metropolis	1	1	0	0	3

James 'Jim' Deely was an Australian rugby league footballer who played in the 1920s and 1930s. He played for Glebe and South Sydney in the New South Wales Rugby League (NSWRL) competition.

== Playing career ==
Deely began his first grade career as a winger with Glebe in 1929 and made his debut in Round 8 against University which finished 6–6. Deeley played in Glebe's last ever game as a first grade club when they drew 24–24 against North Sydney. After the 1929 season was concluded, Glebe were controversially voted out of the competition.

In 1931, Deely joined South Sydney and in his first season with the club was a member of the Souths side which claimed the premiership defeating arch rivals Easts 12–7 with Deely playing at halfback, a position he switched to upon joining Souths.

In 1932, Souths won the premiership for a second consecutive season defeating Western Suburbs 19–12 in the grand final with Deely playing at five-eighth. Deely played two more seasons and retired at the end of 1934.
