= Jack Slockee =

Australian rugby league footballer

Personal information
- Full name: Jack Slockee
- Born: 8 March 1977 (age 48)

Playing information
- Position: Halfback
Club
Years	Team	Pld	T	G	FG	P
1997	South Sydney	1	0	0	0	0
- Source: As of 15 December 2022

Jack Slockee is an Australian former professional rugby league footballer who played in the 1990s. He played for South Sydney in the Australian Rugby League (ARL Competition).

== Playing career ==
Slockee previously played rugby league for Cowra and Canberra's lower grade sides before being signed by South Sydney. Slockee made his first grade debut for South Sydney in round 13 of the 1997 ARL season against the Gold Coast Chargers. Slockee played off the bench in a 28–4 loss at Carrara Oval. It was Slockee's one and only top grade rugby league match.
