= Mark Meredith (rugby league) =

Australian rugby league footballer

Personal information
- Born: 29 January 1982 (age 44) Western Samoa

Playing information
- Position: Prop
Club
Years	Team	Pld	T	G	FG	P
2002–03	South Sydney	5	1	0	0	4

Mark Meredith is a Samoan former professional rugby league footballer who played in the 2000s. He played for South Sydney in the NRL competition.

== Playing career ==
Meredith made his first grade debut for South Sydney in round 25 2002 against North Queensland which finished in a 36-34 loss at the Sydney Football Stadium.

Meredith had to wait until round 22 of the 2003 NRL season for his next game in the top grade which was against the Wests Tigers. Meredith played from the bench in an 18-16 victory at Leichhardt Oval.

In round 24 2003, Meredith scored his only try in first grade which came against North Queensland. Souths lost the match 60-8 at the Willows Sports Complex. Meredith's final game for Souths in first grade was against Cronulla-Sutherland in round 25 2003. Souths lost the match 54-34 at the Sydney Football Stadium. The defeat meant that Souths finished with the Wooden Spoon at the end of 2003 after coming last.

At the end of the 2004 NRL season, Meredith was released by South Sydney and signed a two-year deal to join the Wests Tigers.
