= Os Brown =

Australian rugby league footballer

Personal information
- Full name: Oscar Brown
- Born: 4 August 1889 Newcastle, New South Wales, Australia
- Died: 14 April 1955 (aged 65)

Playing information
- Position: Fullback, Wing
Club
Years	Team	Pld	T	G	FG	P
1911–15	South Sydney	48	7	2	0	25
Representative
Years	Team	Pld	T	G	FG	P
1911	New South Wales	1	0	0	0	0
1911	Metropolis	2	0	0	0	0

Os Brown (1889–1955) was an Australian rugby league footballer who played in the 1910s. He played for South Sydney in the New South Wales Rugby League (NSWRL) competition.

== Playing career ==
Brown made his first grade debut for South Sydney in round one of the 1911 season against North Sydney at the Sydney Sports Ground. In the same year, he was selected for New South Wales and Metropolis.

In 1914, he made 12 appearances for South Sydney as the club won the 1914 premiership. Brown retired following the conclusion of the 1915 season.
