= Tom Craigie =

Australian rugby league footballer

Playing information
- Position: Second-row, Prop
Club
Years	Team	Pld	T	G	FG	P
1927–1930	South Sydney	10	2	0	0	6

Tom Craigie was an Australian rugby league footballer for South Sydney of the New South Wales Rugby League Premiership (NSWRFL). He played four seasons with South Sydney, playing primarily as a second row forward.

== Playing career ==
Craigie made his debut in round 4 of the 1927 season. He scored on debut, helping his team defeat Newtown 24–0. In round 13, Craigie scored in a 34–9 win over Newtown. South Sydney went on to win the 1927 premiership, though Craigie did not play in the finals that year. The following year, he played 3 games for the season. He made 2 more appearances in 1929. South Sydney won both the 1928 and 1929 premierships. In August 1930, Craigie played his final game in a 27–17 win over North Sydney. He concluded his career with 2 tries in 10 appearances.
