= Vince Sheehan (rugby league, South Sydney) =

Australian rugby league footballer

Personal information
- Full name: Vince Sheehan
- Born: 5 December 1896 Redfern, New South Wales, Australia
- Died: 23 May 1926 (aged 29)

Playing information
- Position: Wing, Centre
Club
Years	Team	Pld	T	G	FG	P
1917–22	South Sydney	43	22	0	0	66
Representative
Years	Team	Pld	T	G	FG	P
1919	New South Wales	1	2	0	0	6

Vince Sheehan (5 December 1896 –23 May 1926) was an Australian rugby league footballer who played in the 1910s and 1920s. He played for South Sydney in the New South Wales Rugby League (NSWRL) competition.

== Playing career ==
Sheehan made his first grade debut for South Sydney in round 9 of the 1917 season against Annandale at Wentworth Park.

In 1918, Sheehan played eight games and scored five tries as South Sydney won the premiership that year. In 1919, he was selected to play for New South Wales and made one appearance where he scored two tries against Queensland. He was selected for New South Wales to tour New Zealand but broke his collar bone on the eve of the trip.

Sheehan retired following the conclusion of the 1922 season.

He died in 1926 aged 29 after contacting pneumonia after a short illnes.
