= Noah Sete =

Australian rugby league player

Personal information
- Full name: Noah Sete
- Born: 7 April 1981 (age 44); Newcastle, New South Wales, Australia

Playing information
- Height: 184 cm (6 ft 0 in)
- Weight: 108 kg (17 st 0 lb)
- Position: Prop
Club
Years	Team	Pld	T	G	FG	P
2002	South Sydney	2	0	0	0	0

Noah Sete (/sɛteɪ/) (born 7 April 1981) is an Australian former professional rugby league footballer who played as a prop in the 2000s. He played for the South Sydney Rabbitohs in the NRL.

== Playing career ==
Sete was a Mascot junior. In 2002, he joined the newly readmitted South Sydney Rabbitohs and became a regular member of their side in the lower grade competitions. He made his first grade debut from the bench in his side's 44–6 loss to the Melbourne Storm at the Olympic Park in round 15 of the 2002 season. His only other first grade appearance came in his side's 38–24 victory over the Wests Tigers at the Leichhardt Oval in round 18 of the 2002 season. He was released by South Sydney club at the end of the 2003 season and subsequently never played first grade rugby league again.
