= Ahmad Bajouri =

Lebanon international rugby league footballer

Personal information
- Born: 4 May 1982 (age 44) Lebanon

Playing information
- Position: Wing
Club
Years	Team	Pld	T	G	FG	P
2002	Wests Tigers	9	2	0	0	8
2003	South Sydney	11	0	0	0	0
	Total	20	2	0	0	8
Representative
Years	Team	Pld	T	G	FG	P
2000	Lebanon	0	0	0	0	0

Ahmad Bajouri Lebanese rugby league footballer who represented Lebanon in the 2000 World Cup.

== Playing career ==
Bajouri was selected as part of the Lebanese squad in the 2000 World Cup however he did not play a game.

He made his National Rugby League debut for the Wests Tigers in 2002, playing in nine games before joining South Sydney for the 2003 NRL season.

He played in eleven games for the club before he was involved in a car accident that ended his career. In 2009 a court awarded him over $1 million compensation for the crash due to loss of earnings.
