= Frank Brogan (rugby league) =

Australian rugby league footballer

Personal information
- Full name: Frank Brogan
- Born: 14 December 1903
- Died: 12 July 1961 (aged 57)

Playing information
- Position: Halfback
Club
Years	Team	Pld	T	G	FG	P
1922–29	South Sydney	50	5	0	0	15
Representative
Years	Team	Pld	T	G	FG	P
1924	New South Wales	2	1	0	0	3

Frank Brogan (1903–1961) was an Australian rugby league footballer who played in the 1920s. He played as a halfback with South Sydney during the club's golden era of the 1920s when they won 5 premierships.

== Playing career ==
Brogan made his debut for South Sydney in 1922 against Newtown as an 18-year-old. In 1924, Brogan was selected to play for New South Wales and featured in two matches. The following year, Brogan won his first premiership with Souths as they finished first on the table and were not required to play in a grand final to be declared champions. In 1926, Brogan was a member of the Souths side which defeated University 11–5 at the Sydney Showground (Moore Park). Brogan continued to play with Souths up until the end of 1929 but did not feature in any of the other premiership winning teams that followed in 1927, 1928 and 1929. Brogan's son Ken also played for Souths and featured in the 1949 grand final loss to St George.
