= 1926 NSWRFL season =

Rugby league competition

1926 New South Wales Rugby Football League
- Teams: 9
- Premiers: South Sydney (6th title)
- Minor premiers: South Sydney (6th title)
- Matches played: 75
- Points scored: 2009
- Top points scorer: Jack Courtney (104)
- Wooden spoon: St. George (2nd spoon)
- Top try-scorer: Benny Wearing (14)

The 1926 New South Wales Rugby Football League premiership was the nineteenth season of Sydney’s top-level rugby league club competition, Australia’s first. Nine teams from across the city contested during the season, which culminated in South Sydney’s victory over Sydney University in the premiership final.

== Season summary ==
Rugby league had been going through a period of declining popularity. The “first past the post” method had resulted in a number of seasons where the premiership was decided before the end of scheduled matches, killing interest during the closing rounds. Falling crowd numbers led to the NSWRFL making a substantial loss in 1925, forcing changes to be made. For the 1926 season a finals series was introduced to maintain interest in the competition. The Premiership would therefore be determined amongst the leading four teams.

The league agreed to ban the use of substitutes in order to align with the rules used in British rugby league.

The rules concerning the play-the-ball were also changed. Only two players could play at the ball, with one player from each side being allowed to stand immediately behind, and all other players having to stay behind that second man until the ball was heeled. Previously any number of players could play at the ball, and by 1925 play-the-balls had become a real mess.

The rules were changed so that when a ball was forced in goal by the defending side play restarted with a line drop-out rather than a scrum.

These changes combined with the use of multiple reserve balls turned rugby league into a faster and much more attractive spectacle, and the fans returned.

=== Teams ===
- Balmain, formed on January 23, 1908, at Balmain Town Hall
- Eastern Suburbs, formed on January 24, 1908, at Paddington Town Hall
- Glebe, formed on January 9, 1908
- Newtown, formed on January 14, 1908
- North Sydney, formed on February 7, 1908
- South Sydney, formed on January 17, 1908, at Redfern Town Hall
- St. George, formed on November 8, 1920, at Kogarah School of Arts
- Western Suburbs, formed on February 4, 1908
- University, formed in 1919 at Sydney University

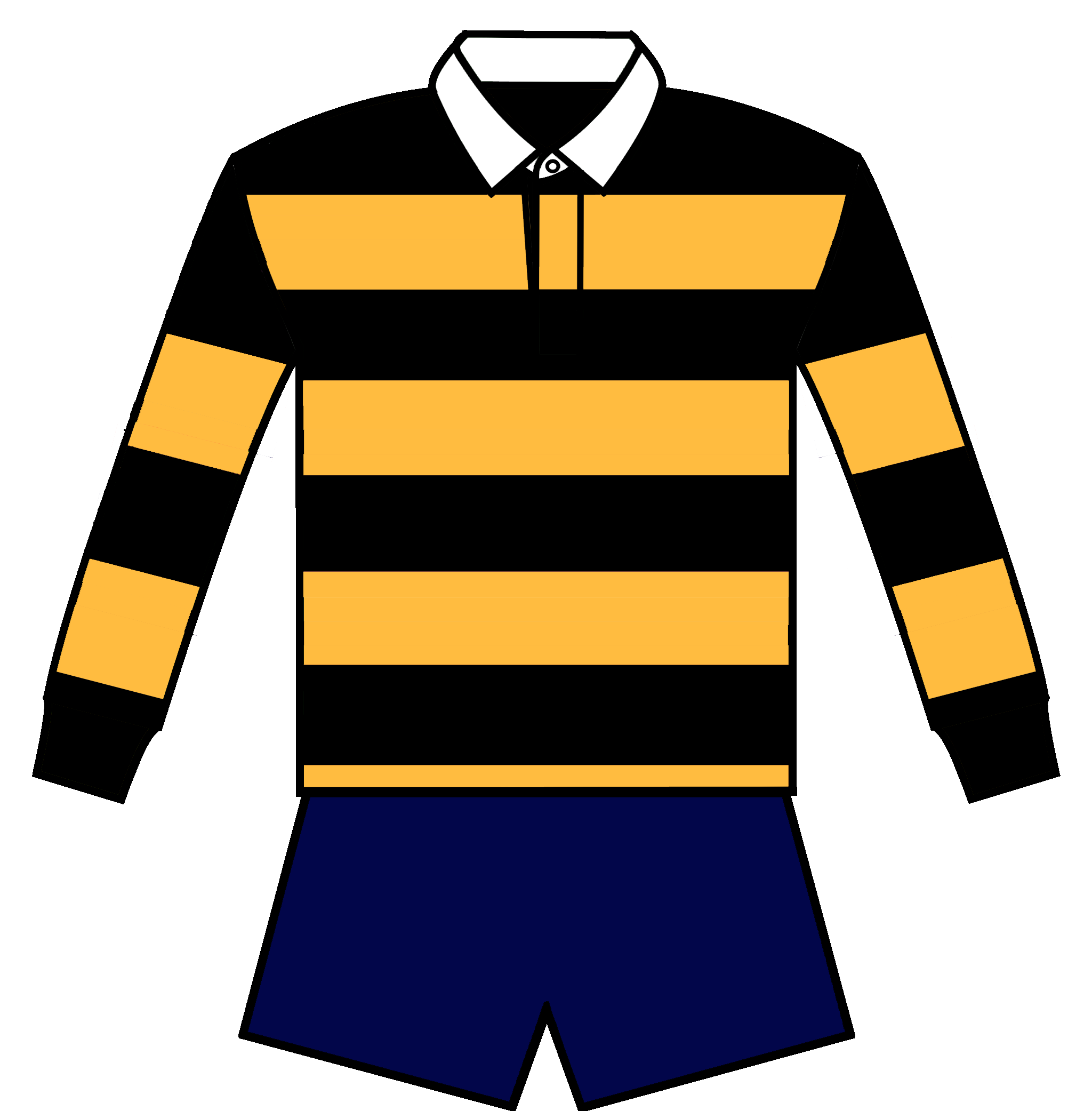
Balmain 19th season Ground: Birchgrove Oval; Coach: Alf Fraser; Captain: Reg Latta

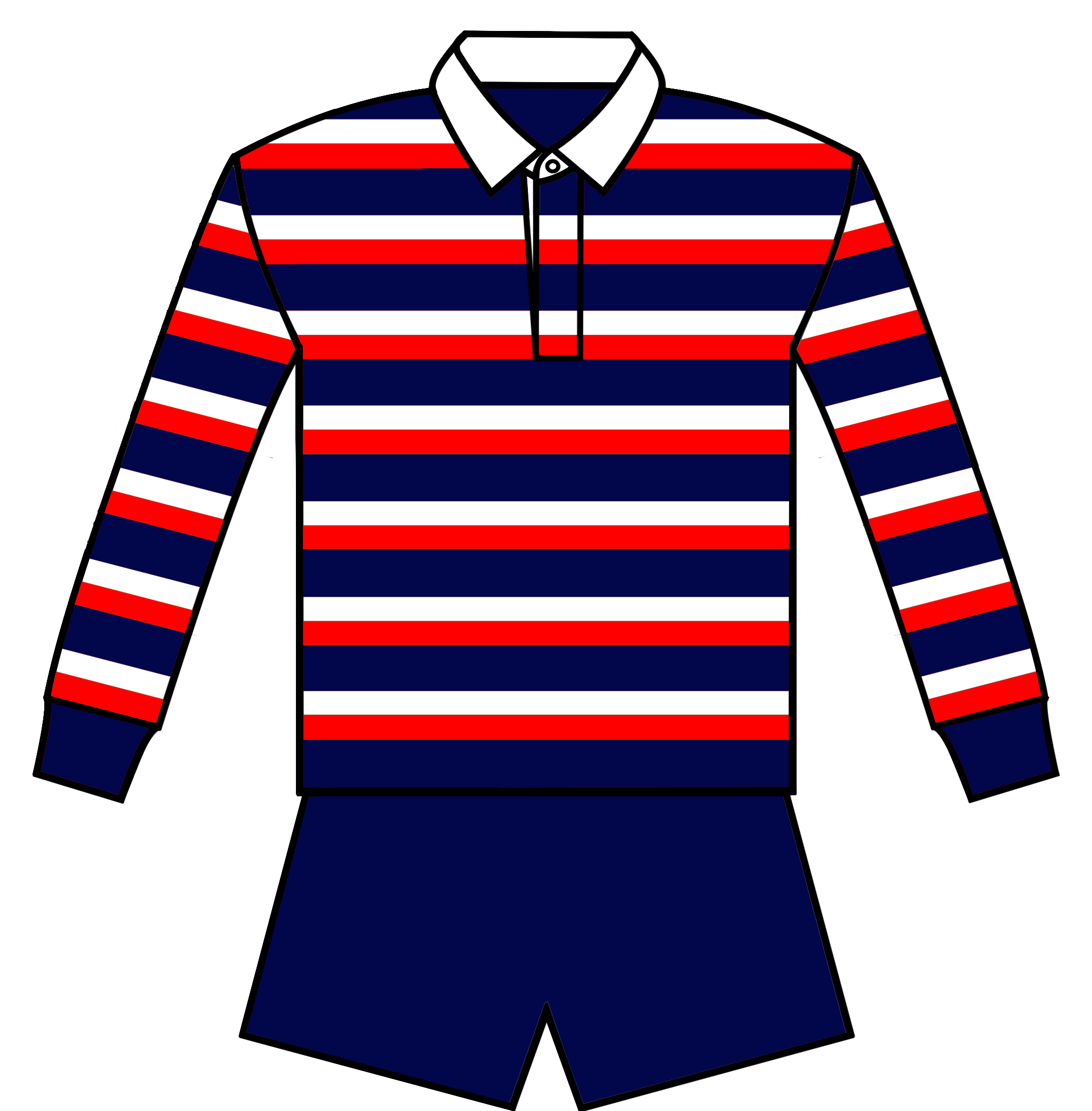
Eastern Suburbs 19th season Ground: RAS Showground; Captains:Arthur Oxford, Les Steel

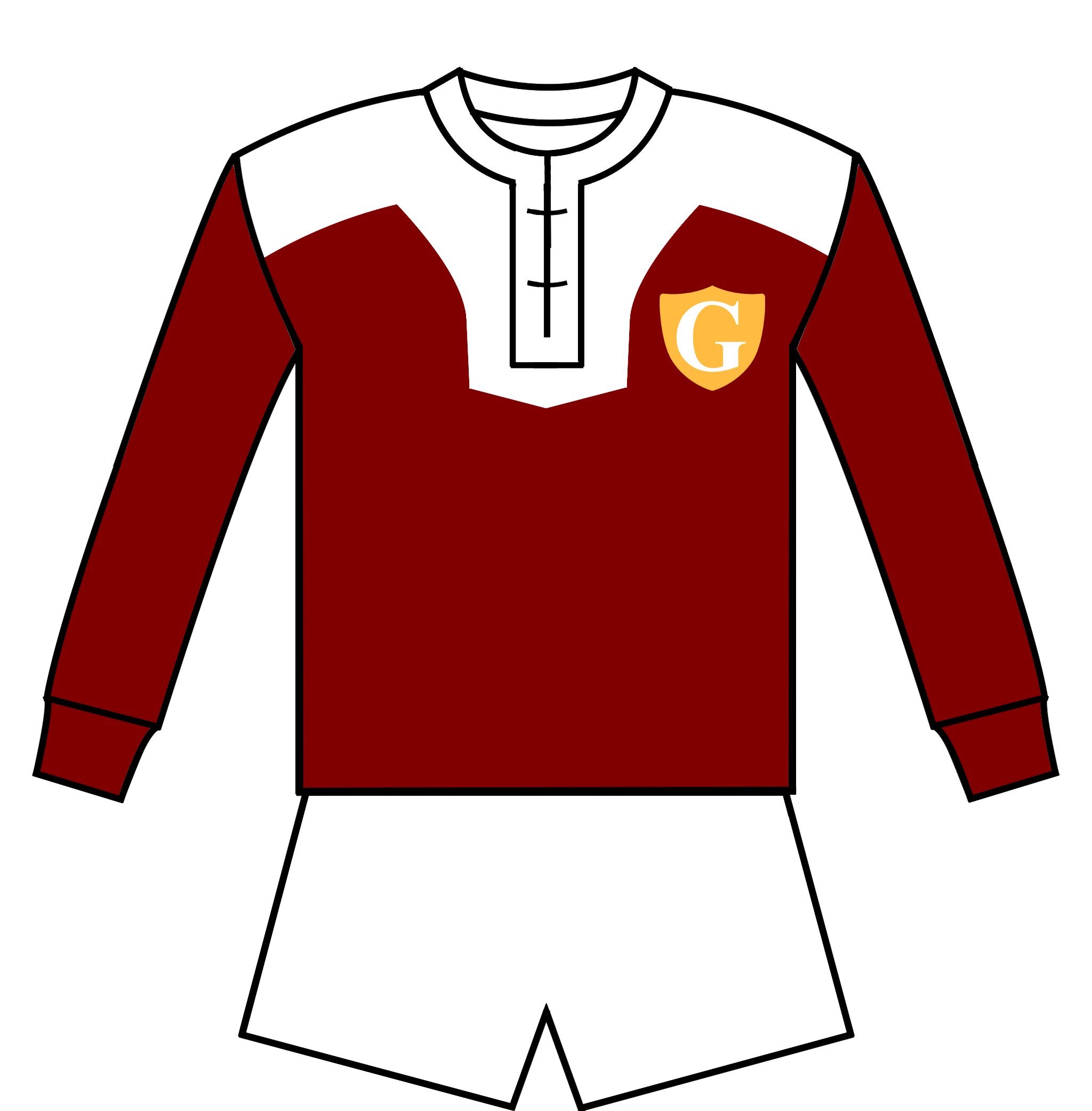
Glebe 19th season Ground: Wentworth Park; Captain: Frank Burge, Tom McGrath

Newtown 19th season Ground: Marrickville Oval; Coach: Albert "Ricketty" Johnston; Captain: Charles Kell

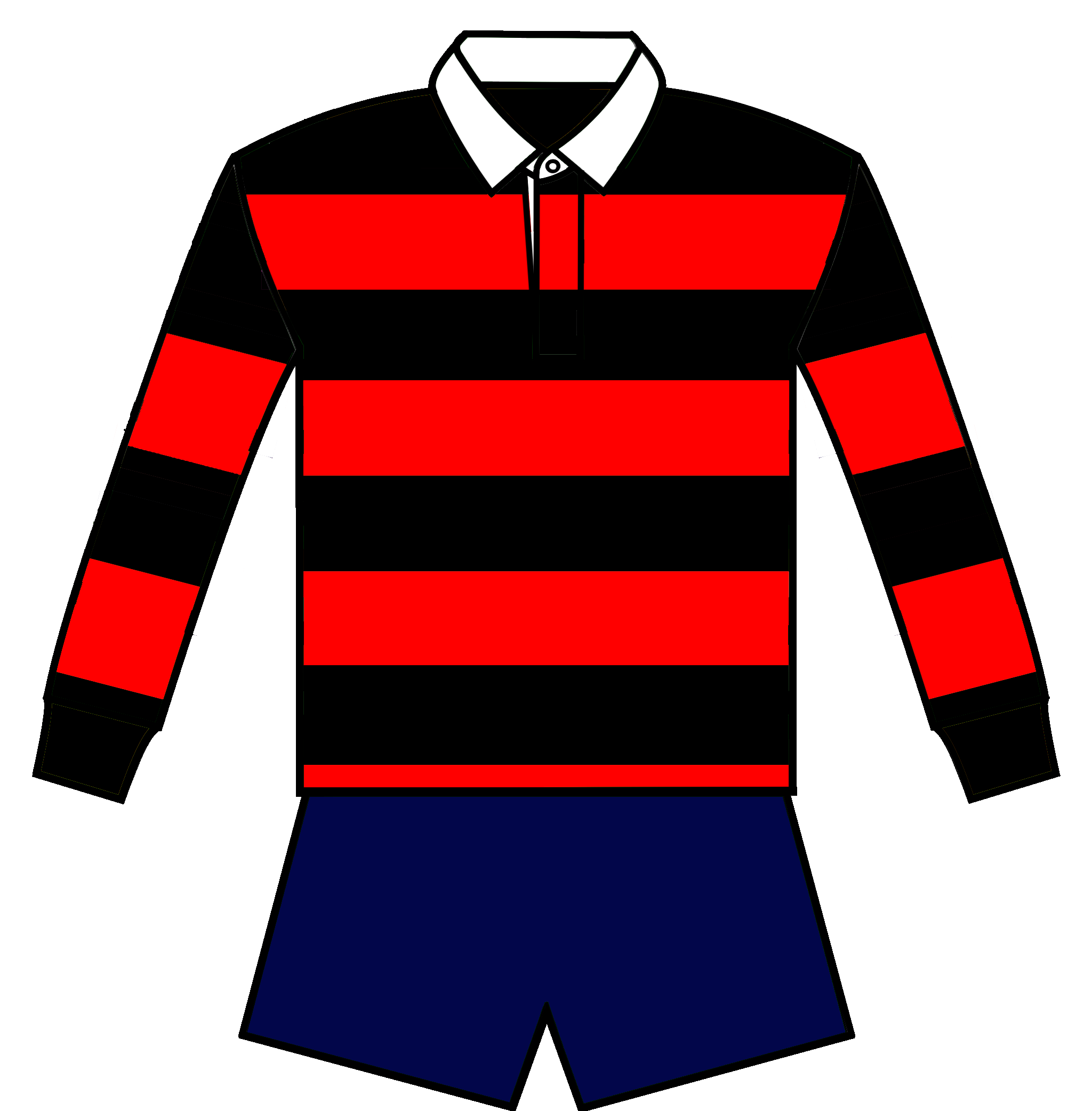
North Sydney 19th season Ground: North Sydney Oval; Captain: Leo O'Connor

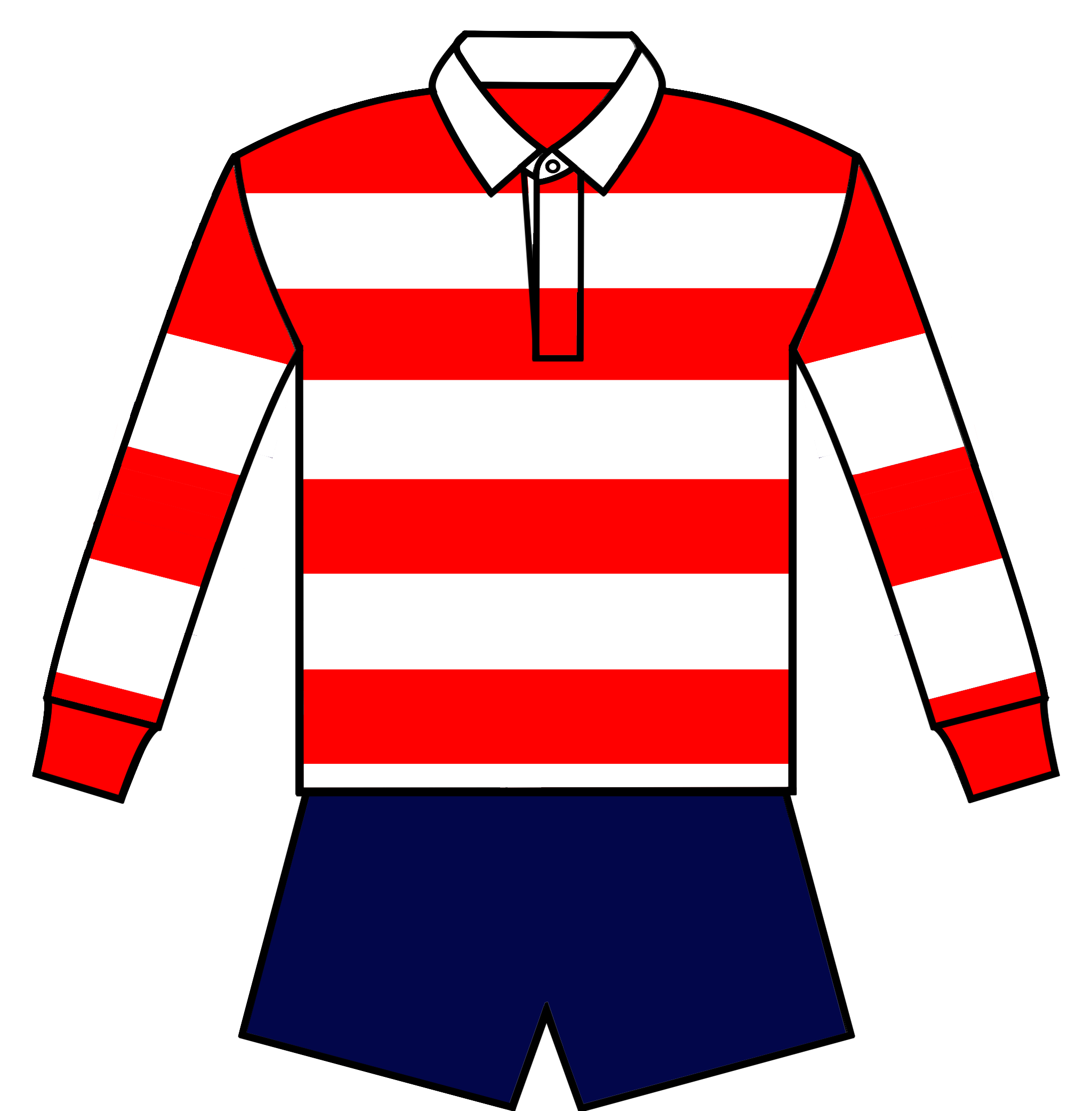
St. George 6th season Ground: Earl Park; Captain-Coach: Arnold Traynor

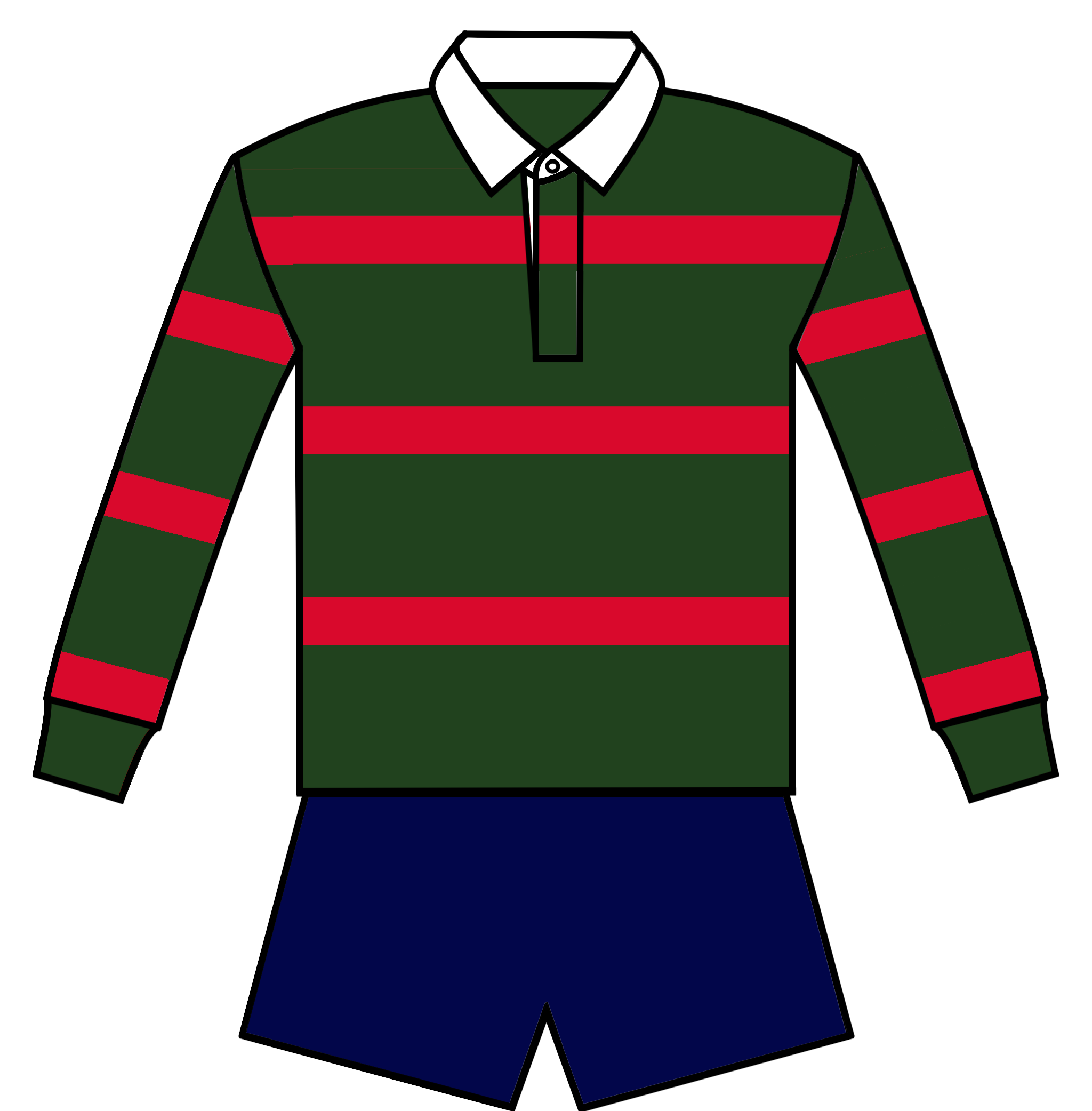
South Sydney 19th season Ground: Sydney Cricket Ground; Coach: Howard Hallett; Captain: Alf Blair

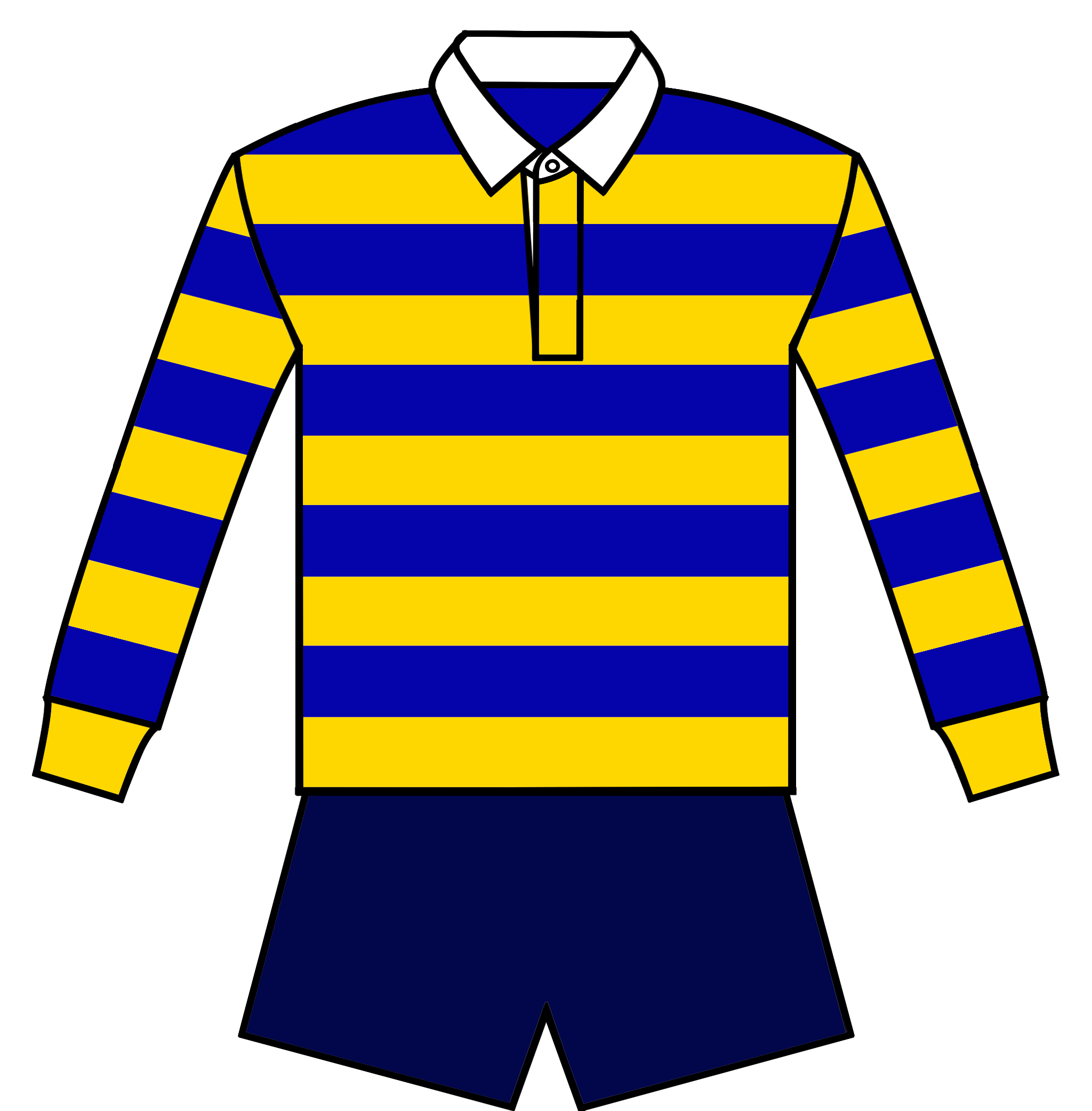
University 7th season Coach: Bill Kelly; Captain: A.S. Lane

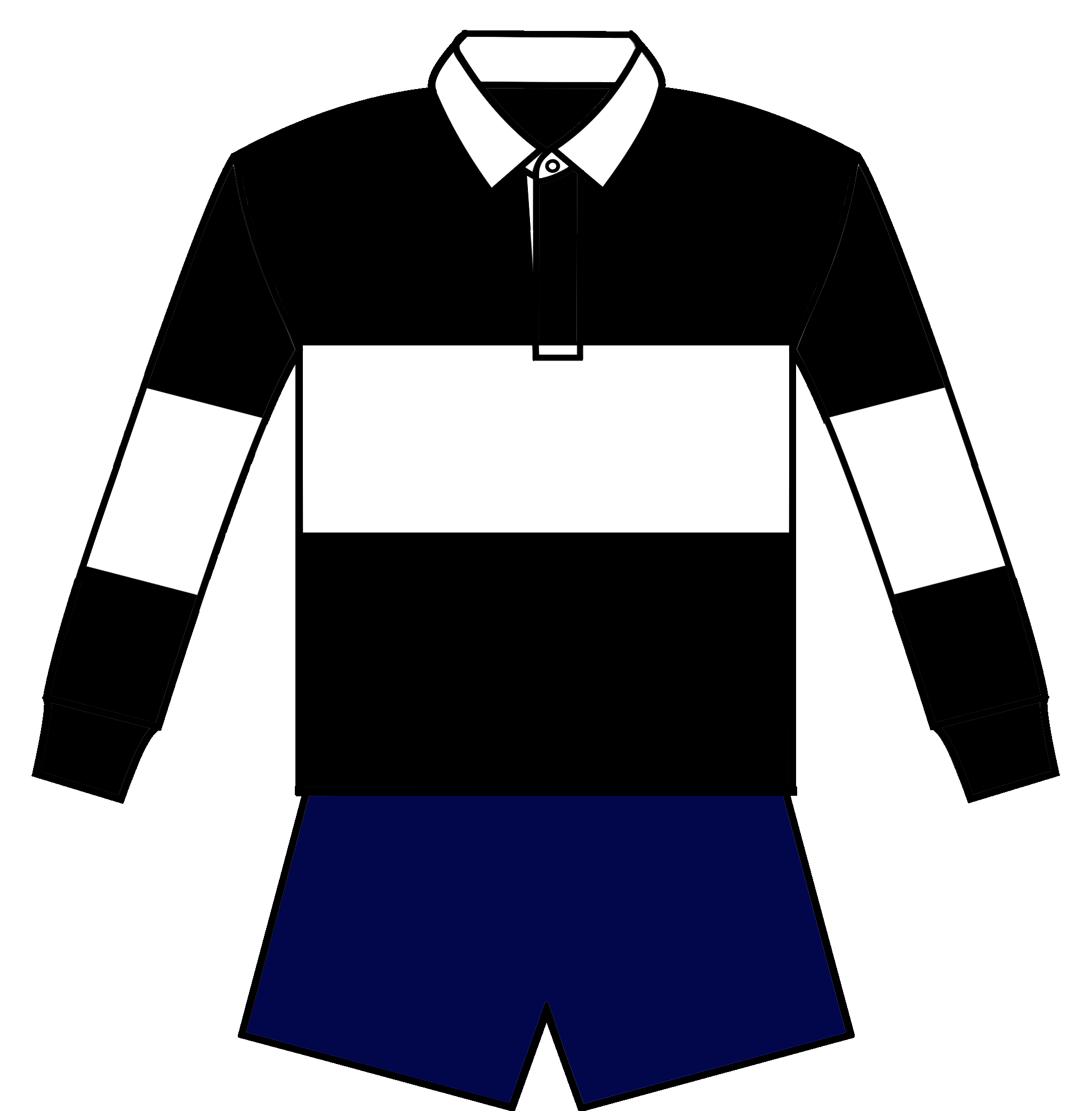
Western Suburbs 19th season Ground: Pratten Park; Coach: Captain: Gordon Stettler

=== Ladder ===
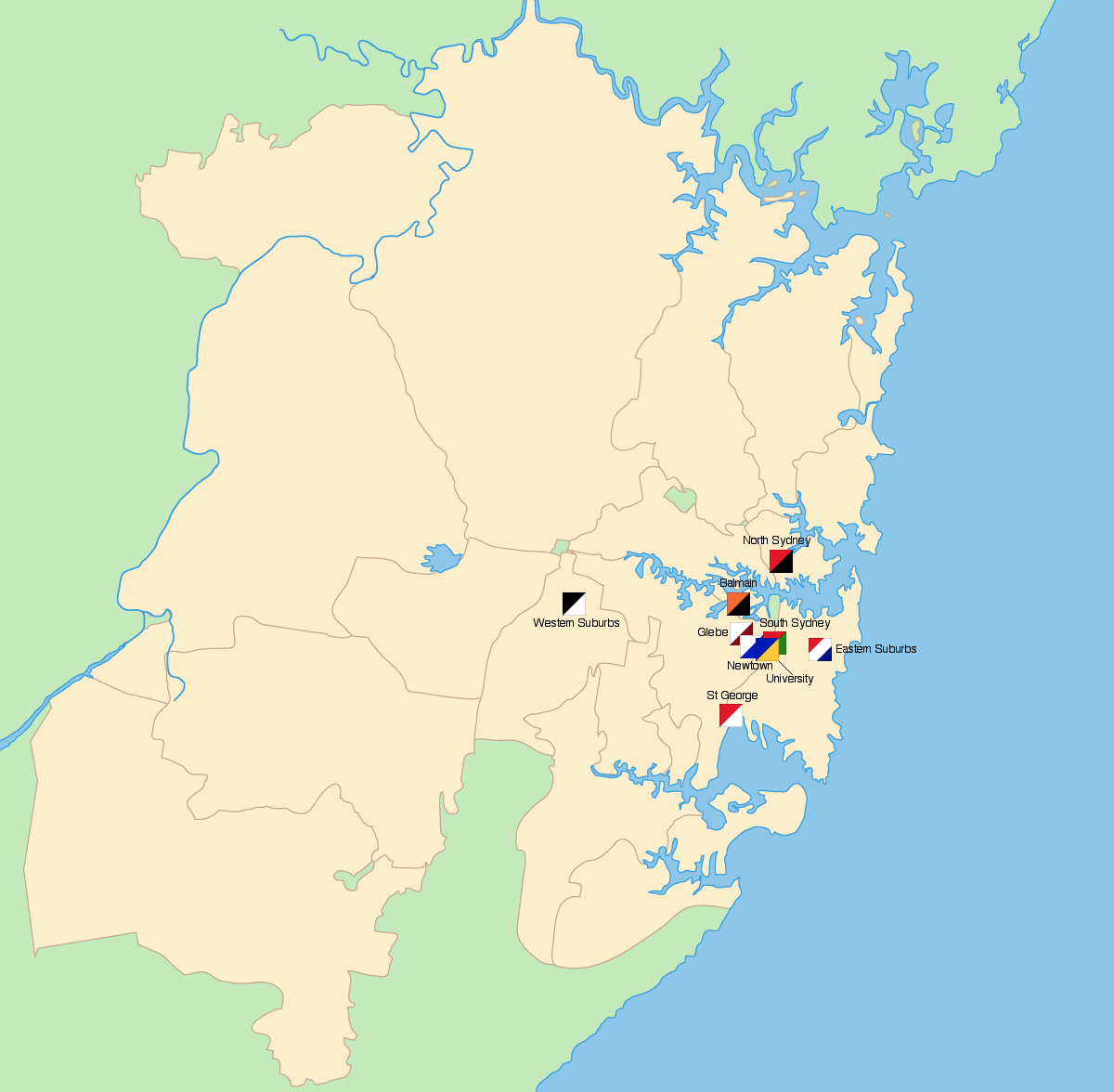
The geographical locations of the teams that contested the 1926 premiership across Sydney.

Pos.	Team	Pld.	W	D	L	B	PF	PA	Diff.	Pts.
1	South Sydney	16	14	0	2	2	318	146	+172	32
2	Glebe	16	9	1	6	2	188	168	+20	23
3	Eastern Suburbs	16	9	1	6	2	207	192	+15	23
4	Sydney University	16	9	0	7	2	198	217	–19	22
5	Western Suburbs	16	8	0	8	2	252	227	+25	20
6	Newtown	16	7	0	9	2	189	223	–34	18
7	North Sydney	16	7	0	9	2	227	271	–44	18
8	Balmain	16	6	0	10	2	187	184	+3	16
9	St. George	16	2	0	14	2	169	307	–138	8

== Finals ==
At one stage in the second half of the season, University had been sitting just one win behind reigning premiers South Sydney. But five successive losses at the back end of the season saw them fall to fourth on the ladder. This though was enough to secure their only ever finals berth in their eighteen-year history. South Sydney for the second season straight showed consistent good form, and in the end comfortably won the minor premiership.

In the semi-finals, both University and South Sydney comfortably defeated their opponents to progress to the final.

Semi-finals
4 September – Sydney Cricket Ground
Glebe	3
University	29
11 September – Sydney Cricket Ground
South Sydney	21
Eastern Suburbs	5

Final
18 September – Agricultural Showground
South Sydney	11
University	5

=== Final ===
South Sydney	Position	Sydney University
Alan Righton	FB	Hubert Finn
Alby Carr	WG	Tom Barry
Vic Lawrence	CE	Frank O'Rourke
Harry Finch	CE	Paddy McCormack
Reg Williams	WG	Martin Cunningham
Alf Blair (c)	FE	A.S. Lane (c)
Frank Brogan	HB	Ed Wynter
Arch Thompson	PR	Edward Ryan
Harry Cavanough	HK	Frank Benning
George Treweek	PR	Jim Ward
Edward Root	SR	Sammy Ogg
Alf O'Connor	SR	Bill Flanagan
David Watson	LK	John McIntyre
Howard Hallett	Coach	Bill Kelly

The 1926 season was the most successful of the eighteen seasons between the wars in which University competed in the top Sydney grade. This may have had to do with their coach Bill Kelly or their new trainer, the former Kangaroo Sid Pearce. Or perhaps they benefitted from that season’s play-the-ball rule change which initially resulted in a cleaner and faster game that suited the lighter and quicker Students. Whatever the reason they won their first seven games.

However the loss of their centre Frank O'Rourke to a broken hand, saw them slip in the final rounds to finish fourth. The play-off system and South Sydney’s “right-of-challenge” as minor-premiers required University to beat the powerful Glebe side and then South Sydney twice to take the title.

In the semi-final against Glebe, University regained their early season form and trounced Glebe by 29–3.

O'Rourke returned for the Final and lined up with state representatives Hubert “Butt” Finn, Jim McIntyre and Alby Lane in front of 20,000 at the Royal Agricultural Society Grounds.

In the opening twenty minutes University had three opportunities to score but poor finishing let them down. After withstanding the Students’ attack Souths responded with eleven points of their own by the half-time break. Early in the second half University’s centre McCormack hit back with an intercept try to pull the deficit back to 11–5 however the Rabbitohs defence held for the remainder of the game and they claimed the premiership.

Referee Webby Neill, himself a former premiership winning Rabbitoh, sent off Souths’ Edward Root during the match.

South Sydney 11 (Tries: Brogan, Finch, Watson. Goal: Blair)

University 5 (Tries: Paddy McCormack. Goal: Jim McIntyre)

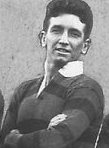
Alf O'Connor

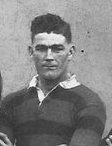
Alby Carr
