= Ray Morris =

Australian rugby league footballer

- Ray Morris

Personal information
- Full name: Ray Benjamin Morris
- Born: 4 April 1908 Ashfield, New South Wales, Australia
- Died: 10 August 1933 (aged 25) Valletta, Malta

Playing information
- Position: Three-quarter back
Club
Years	Team	Pld	T	G	FG	P
1927–32	Western Suburbs	52	29	0	0	87
1933	Sydney University	5	2	0	0	6
	Total	57	31	0	0	93
Representative
Years	Team	Pld	T	G	FG	P
1931–33	New South Wales	9	5	0	0	15
1931–32	NSW City	2	2	0	0	6

Ray Morris (1908-1933) was an Australian professional rugby league footballer who played in the 1920s and 1930s. A New South Wales representative three-quarter back, he played his club football in Sydney for Western Suburbs (with whom he won the 1930 NSWRFL Premiership), then for Sydney University until his death on the 1933-34 Kangaroo tour.

== Playing career ==
Morris played first grade for the New South Wales Rugby Football League's Western Suburbs club from 1927 to 1932. During this time he helped Wests to victory the 1930 competition's Grand Final, scoring a try, and also played in the 1932 season's final.

Morris moved to the Sydney University team for the 1933 NSWRFL season, and following strong performances for New South Wales against Queensland, became the club's first player to be selected for the Australia national team squad when he embarked on the 1933–34 Kangaroo tour of Great Britain. Whilst en route by ship to London, Morris developed an ear infection and meningitis after swimming at Colombo and disembarked in Malta for medical attention. There he died from complications after surgery.

== Funeral and legacy ==
Morris' body was returned to Sydney for burial. A very large funeral service place at Sydney Town Hall on 23 September 1933. The burial later took place at Waverley Cemetery. Four members of the University Rugby League Club -- Ross McKinnon, Tom Monaghan, Gordon Favelle and G.Sullivan acted as pall-bearers together with four members of the Western Suburbs Club. Thousands of people attended the service. Among those who attended were a famous New South Wales Rugby League administrators such as Harry Jersey Flegg (president), W.A. Billy Cann (vice president), Bill Kelly (vice president) and J J Giltinan (Founder). Every club in the New South Wales Rugby League were represented by their executives. Many notable former players attended including Dally Messenger, Denis Lutge, Alex Burdon, Charles 'Boxer' Russell, William "Webby" Neill, Cec Blinkhorn, Claud O'Donnell, Clarrie Prentice, Harry Finch, Arthur Justice, Eddie Root and Benny Wearing. Large crowds gathered outside the Town Hall, and when the cortege moved off, the traffic was blocked for some time. The route to the Waverley Cemetery was lined with crowds of people and there was a large gathering at the graveside. The outpouring of grief in Sydney was enormous and the New South Wales Rugby League sent flowers to the graveside for many decades afterward. On arrival in Sydney on 26 February 1934, many team-mates from the 1933-34 Kangaroo tour of Great Britain visited the grave to pay their last respects. The grave of Ray Morris is situated at Waverley Anglican Cemetery, Section 15, Row 24, Grave number 6636.

The Ray Morris headstone

The grave of Ray Morris at Waverley Cemetery

The headstone reads :- "Ray Morris. Who died at Malta while on tour with Aust. Rugby League Team. (KANGAROOS) 10th August 1933. Aged 25 Years. Loved and Remembered By All." The gravesite is considered an Australian rugby league shrine.

The "Ray Morris Medal", which is awarded by the Malta Rugby League to the Maltese player of the year has been named in Morris's honour since 2008.
