= Bill Flanagan (rugby league) =

Australian rugby league footballer

Personal information
- Full name: William Flanagan

Playing information
- Position: Prop, Lock, Hooker
Club
Years	Team	Pld	T	G	FG	P
1926–29	University	45	12	32	0	100

Bill Flanagan was an Australian rugby league footballer who played in the 1920s. He played for University in the New South Wales Rugby League (NSWRL) competition.

== Playing career ==
Flanagan made his first grade debut for University against Western Suburbs in Round 12 1926 at the Sydney Cricket Ground. Flanagan scored a try in the 20-8 victory.

In 1926, University went on to finish 4th on the table and qualified for their first finals campaign. The Students went on to defeat Glebe in the preliminary final. In the grand final, The Students opponents were South Sydney who boasted the likes of George Treweek, Eddie Root and Alf Blair and had gone the previous season undefeated. Flanagan played at prop in the game as Souths raced out to an 11-0 lead at halftime. A second half fightback by University was not enough and Souths ran out winners 11-5 at the Royal Agricultural Society Grounds in front of 20,000 spectators.

In 1927, University finished last on the table and claimed the wooden spoon in a complete form reversal. University did much better the following season in 1928 finishing 5th. In Flanagan's last season with the club, they finished last on the table winning only 2 games for the entire year. Flanagan finished the top point scorer for the club with 65 points.
