= John McIntyre (rugby league) =

Australian rugby league footballer

Personal information
- Full name: John McIntyre

Playing information
- Position: Hooker, Second-row
Club
Years	Team	Pld	T	G	FG	P
1926–28	University	39	4	82	0	176
Representative
Years	Team	Pld	T	G	FG	P
1928	NSW City	2	0	4	0	8
- Source: As of 10 May 2019

John McIntyre nicknamed "Jack" was an Australian rugby league footballer who played in the 1920s. He played for University in the New South Wales Rugby League (NSWRL) competition.

== Playing career ==
McIntyre made his first grade debut for University against Western Suburbs in Round 3 1926 at Pratten Park. In 1926, University surprised everyone in the competition by going from easy beats in previous seasons to being grand finalists.

University finished 4th on the table and qualified for the first finals campaign. The Students went on to defeat Glebe to reach the grand final. In the grand final, The Students opponents were South Sydney who boasted the likes of George Treweek, Eddie Root and Alf Blair and had gone the previous season undefeated. Souths raced out to an 11-0 lead at halftime before University scored a converted try to make the score 11-5. After University scored this try they were unable to score any further points as the Souths defence held firm and they lost the final at the Royal Agricultural Society Grounds in front of 20,000 spectators.

In 1927, University finished last on the table and claimed the wooden spoon. McIntyre finished the season as the club's top point scorer with 60 points. The following year in 1928, University avoided the wooden spoon but missed out on the finals. McIntyre finished the year as the club's top point scorer for a second season in a row with 86 points. McIntyre was also selected to play for NSW City and featured in 2 games. McIntyre then departed the club and went on to play in the NSW Country competitions. McIntyre is University's record points scorer with 184 points in all competitions.
