= Edward Ryan (rugby league) =

Australian rugby league footballer

Personal information
- Full name: Edward Ryan

Playing information
- Position: Lock, Hooker, Second-row, Wing, Centre
Club
Years	Team	Pld	T	G	FG	P
1922–27	University	66	20	18	0	96
- Source: As of 10 May 2019

Edward Ryan nicknamed "Mo" was an Australian rugby league footballer who played in the 1920s. He played for University in the New South Wales Rugby League (NSWRL) competition.

== Playing career ==
Ryan made his first grade debut for University against Newtown in Round 2 1922 at the Sydney Cricket Ground with University winning 11–8.

Ryan went on to play 10 games as University finished second last on the table. In 1923 and 1924, University finished last on the table claiming the wooden spoon. Ryan finished as top point scorer for the club in 1924.

In 1926, University surprised everyone in the competition by going from easy beats to being grand finalists. University finished 4th on the table and qualified for the first finals campaign. The Students went on to defeat Glebe to reach the grand final with Ryan scoring 2 tries in the game. In the grand final, The Students opponents were South Sydney who boasted the likes of George Treweek, Eddie Root and Alf Blair. Souths raced out to an 11–0 lead at halftime before University scored a converted try to make the score 11–5. After University scored this try they were unable to score any further points and lost the final at the Royal Agricultural Society Grounds in front of 20,000 spectators. Ryan finished the 1926 as the club's top try scorer and top point scorer.

Ryan played one last season in 1927 as University finished last on the table claiming another wooden spoon after winning only three games all year. Ryan is University's record try scorer with 25 tries in all competitions.
