= Keith Pettiford =

Australian rugby player (1915–1942)

Personal information
- Born: 15 February 1915; Wollongong, New South Wales, Australia
- Died: 20 November 1942 (aged 27) near Upper Hulme, England

Playing information
- Position: Wing
Club
Years	Team	Pld	T	G	FG	P
1937	University	1	0	0	0	0

Keith Pettiford (15 February 1915 – 20 November 1942) was an Australian RAAF officer who died in WWII and rugby league footballer who played in the New South Wales Rugby League for Sydney University.

== Early life and rugby league career ==
Pettiford was born on 15 February 1915 in Wollongong to parents Henry Augustine and Ellen Scott Pettiford. He graduated from the University of Sydney with a B.A. degree, and appeared once as wing for the university's rugby league team in 1937.

== Military career ==
Pettiford worked as a public school teacher in his hometown of Wollongong. He enlisted in the Royal Australian Air Force on 28 April 1941 in Sydney. Rising through the ranks to flying officer, Pettiford served in England as part of No. 27 Operations Training Unit RAF, flying Vickers Wellington bombers from RAF Lichfield. On 20 November 1942, serving as a flight navigator on Vickers Wellington Z1744, Pettiford and the other five crewmen aboard were killed when the bomber crashed near Upper Hulme. The Wellington had been intercepted by two American Supermarine Spitfires while the bomber was conducting a training flight. One of the fighters cut the radio line used to communicate with the airbase, causing Z1744's crew to become disoriented and to eventually crash. Pettiford and the other Australian casualties were buried in Fradley (St. Stephen) Cemetery.

== Career statistics ==
Appearances and goals by club, season and competition
Club	Season	Division	League				Other				Total			
Club	Season	Division	Apps	Tries	Goals	Points	Apps	Tries	Goals	Points	Apps	Tries	Goals	Points
University	1937	New South Wales Rugby League	1	0	0	0	0	0	0	0	1	0	0	0
Career total			1	0	0	0	0	0	0	0	1	0	0	0
