= Paddy McCormack (rugby league) =

Australian rugby league footballer

Personal information
- Full name: Paddy McCormack

Playing information
- Position: Centre, Halfback, Five-eighth, Wing
Club
Years	Team	Pld	T	G	FG	P
1926–29	University	50	9	0	0	27
- Source: As of 10 May 2019

Paddy McCormack was an Australian rugby league footballer who played in the 1920s. He played for University in the New South Wales Rugby League (NSWRL) competition.

== Background ==
McCormack played rugby union for St Joseph's in Hunters Hill before switching codes and joining University.

== Playing career ==
McCormack made his debut for University against Eastern Suburbs in Round 4 1926 which was played at Wentworth Park. Originally a five-eighth, McCormack switched to the wing and centre later in the season.

University went on to finish 4th on the table and qualified for the first finals campaign. The Students went on to defeat Glebe to reach the grand final with McCormack scoring a try in the preliminary final victory. In the grand final, The Students opponents were South Sydney who boasted the likes of George Treweek, Eddie Root and Alf Blair and had gone the previous season undefeated. Souths raced out to an 11-0 lead at halftime before McCormack who was playing in the centres crossed for a try in the second half. After University scored this try they were unable to score any further points as the Souths defence held firm and they lost the final at the Royal Agricultural Society Grounds in front of 20,000 spectators.

In 1927, University finished last on the table and claimed the wooden spoon. McCormack finished the 1927 season as the club's joint top try scorer. The following year in 1928, University avoided the wooden spoon but missed out on the finals. McCormack's final season for University was in 1929 and the club finished last on the table after only winning 2 games all year.
