= Ernest Ogg =

Australian rugby league footballer (1906–1969)

- 'Sammy' Ogg. 1930

Personal information
- Full name: Ernest Samuel Ogg
- Born: 30 December 1906 Camperdown, New South Wales
- Died: 8 July 1969 (aged 62) Dover Heights, New South Wales

Playing information
- Position: Second-row
Club
Years	Team	Pld	T	G	FG	P
1925–33	University	118	24	18	0	108
Representative
Years	Team	Pld	T	G	FG	P
1925	Metropolis	1	0	0	0	0
1929	NSW City	1	0	0	0	0

Ernest Samuel 'Sammy' Ogg (1906–1969) was an Australian rugby league footballer who played in the 1920s and 1930s. He played in the New South Wales Rugby League premiership for University, whom he also captained.

== Background ==
Ogg was born at Camperdown, New South Wales on 30 December 1906.

== Playing career ==
While obtaining his medical degree at the University of Sydney, he joined the University Rugby League team in 1925 and played a total of nine seasons with them between 1925 and 1933. He played second row in the 1926 Grand Final loss to South Sydney.

He later went on to captain the team during his later years as a player. He played 118 first grade games, scoring 24 tries and kicking 18 goals during his career. Ogg is the record appearance holder for the University club. He claimed five Wooden Spoon's whilst at University as the club struggled on the field for a number of years.

== Post playing ==
Ogg became a doctor in Sydney and later the chief Coroner of New South Wales.

== Death ==
Ogg died at Dover Heights, Sydney on 8 July 1969.
