= Edmund Hanrahan (rugby league) =

Australian rugby league footballer

Personal information
- Full name: Edmund Hanrahan

Playing information
- Position: Second-row, Lock
Club
Years	Team	Pld	T	G	FG	P
1920–21	University	12	0	0	0	0
Representative
Years	Team	Pld	T	G	FG	P
1921	New South Wales	1	1	0	0	3
- Source: As of 19 April 2023

Edmund Hanrahan nicknamed "Feather" was an Australian former professional rugby league footballer who played in the 1920s. He played for University in the NSWRL competition.

== Playing career ==
Hanrahan made his first-grade debut for University in their inaugural game in the NSWRFL when they played against North Sydney in round 2 of the 1920 NSWRFL season at North Sydney Oval. In 1921, Hanrahan was selected to play for New South Wales and earned the distinction of being the club's first NSW player.
