= Martin Cunningham =

Australian rugby league footballer

Personal information
- Full name: Martin Aloysius Cunningham
- Born: 12 March 1903 Raymond Terrace, New South Wales, Australia
- Died: 19 October 1979 (aged 76) Tamworth, New South Wales

Playing information
- Position: Five-eighth, Centre, Wing
Club
Years	Team	Pld	T	G	FG	P
1922–23	University	21	3	1	0	11
1924–25	Eastern Suburbs	6	0	2	0	0
1926–28	University	33	3	0	0	9
	Total	60	6	3	0	20
Representative
Years	Team	Pld	T	G	FG	P
1923	Metropolis	1	0	0	0	0

Martin Aloysius Cunningham (1903-1979), was a rugby league footballer in the New South Wales Rugby League (NSWRL)- Australia's major rugby league competition.

== Playing career ==
Cunningham began his career playing with the University club in 1922. He played 52 matches for that club in the years 1922–23 and 1926–28.

A Winger, Cunningham was a member of University’s most successful side that was beaten in the 1926 premiership decider by South Sydney.

Between his stints at the University club Cunningham had two seasons at the Eastern Suburbs club playing in 9 matches and is recognised as that club's 145th player.

== Death ==
He died at Tamworth, New South Wales on 19 November 1979.

== Sources ==
- The Encyclopedia of Rugby League, Alan Whiticker and Glen Hudson
- History Of The New South Wales Rugby League Finals, Steve Hadden
