= Arch Thompson =

Australian rugby league footballer

Personal information
- Full name: Archibald Thompson
- Born: 1902 Sydney, New South Wales, Australia

Playing information
- Position: Hooker, Lock
Club
Years	Team	Pld	T	G	FG	P
1925–27	South Sydney	28	0	0	0	0

Arch Thompson, nicknamed "Ruggie", was an Australian rugby league footballer who played in the 1920s. He played for South Sydney in the NSWRL competition during the club's first golden era where Souths won 7 premierships in 8 seasons.

== Playing career ==
Thompson made his first grade debut for South Sydney against Balmain in Round 1 1925 at the Sydney Cricket Ground. Thompson made 10 appearances for Souths in 1925 as the club won the premiership going undefeated throughout the season.

In 1926, South Sydney reached the grand final against University who had surprised the competition reaching their first decider. Thompson played at lock in Souths 11–5 victory which was played at the Royal Agricultural Society Grounds in front of 20,000 spectators.

In 1927, Thompson played 2 games for the club but did not play in the premiership winning team which defeated St George.
