= Jack Gray-Spence =

Australian rugby league & rugby union player

Personal information
- Full name: John Alfred Gray-Spence
- Born: 9 February 1910; Sydney, New South Wales, Australia
- Died: 5 May 1992 (aged 82); Coogee, New South Wales, Australia

Playing information

Rugby league
- Position: Wing
Club
Years	Team	Pld	T	G	FG	P
1932	Eastern Suburbs	1	0	0	0	0
1933–34	University	24	15	0	0	45
	Total	25	15	0	0	45

Rugby union
- Position: Wing
Club
Years	Team	Pld	T	G	FG	P
1936	Randwick
1937–?	St George
	Total	0	0	0	0	0

John Alfred Gray-Spence (9 February 1910 – 5 May 1992) was an Australian rugby league and rugby union player from the 1930s and 1940s.

Jack Grey-Spence was a brilliant winger for the Sydney University rugby league team. He played two seasons with them in 1933–1934, and Gray-Spence was the NSWRFL top try scorer in 1933. He moved to St George Dragons in 1935 before retiring from rugby league.

Gray-Spence, like his brother Jim, retained his amateur status while playing rugby league. They both successfully applied to be reinstated to play rugby union in 1936. They played for Randwick in 1936, and became residentially qualified for St George in 1937. He also represented New South Wales in Rugby.

Jack Grey-Spence died on 5 May 1992, aged 82.
