= Eric McClintock =

Australian public servant and businessman

Sir Eric McClintock
- Born: Eric Paul McClintock; 13 September 1918; Gulgong, New South Wales, Australia
- Died: 27 March 2018 (aged 99); Sydney, New South Wales, Australia
- Education: De La Salle College, Armidale, University of Sydney
- Occupations: Public servant, businessman
- Years active: 1935–2018
- Employer: Woolworths (1980–1987)
- Spouse: Lady Eve (m. 1943; died 2013)
- Rugby league career

Playing information
- Position: Fullback, Centre
Club
Years	Team	Pld	T	G	FG	P
1936	Sydney University	3	0	0	0	0

Sir Eric Paul McClintock (13 September 1918 – 27 March 2018) was an Australian public servant and businessman. He was notable for serving as chairman of Woolworths from 1980 to 1987.

== Early life ==
McClintock was born on 13 September 1918 in Gulgong, New South Wales, to Robert Emanuel McClintock (d. 1979), a newspaper proprietor and his wife, Ada Marion McClintock (née Whitton; 1888–1987). He was educated at De La Salle College, Armidale, and the University of Sydney, where he played rugby league.

== Career ==
McClintock worked in the Naval Supply Office, Department of the Navy, 1935–1947. He joined the Australian Trade Commissioner Service, serving in Washington as Commercial Attaché on various international emergency food council committees. He was appointed an Assistant Trade Commissioner in 1948, based in New York. He returned to Australia in 1951 as Director of Trade Promotion in the Department of Commerce and Agriculture.

He was a speech writer for future Prime Minister John McEwen, then Minister for Trade, and served as First Assistant Secretary, Department of Trade, 1958–1961. He was also associated with the Australian Industry Development Corporation.

After leaving the Public Service, he was chairman of Woolworths from 1980 to 1987. During his tenure, the Dick Smith electronics business and Victorian supermarket chain Safeway were acquired, and the "Fresh Food People" slogan was instituted. In 1986, for the first time since 1923, no final dividend was paid on the company's shares.

Directorships and board appointments include Ashton Mining, the Asia Pacific Space Centre Advisory Board, and Commissioner of Medicare Australia 2004–05. He was NSW campaign chair for the Australian Prospectors & Miners' Hall of Fame (now defunct).

== Personal life ==
McClintock was married to Lady Eve from 1943 until her death in 2013. They had three children; Paul, the former chairman of Myer and Medibank Private; Leigh, who followed his father into the Department of Trade and worked for Alcoa in North Asia; and Marjorie "Marg", an architect. In 2010, McClintock delivered the eulogy at the funeral of his friend and neighbour, the novelist Jon Cleary.

McClintock died in Sydney on 27 March 2018 at the age of 99.

== Honours ==
Eric McClintock was knighted in the 1981 New Year's Honours for service to exports and industry.
