= Harleigh Hanrahan =

Australian rugby league footballer

Personal information
- Full name: Harleigh Hanrahan

Playing information
- Position: Centre, Wing
Club
Years	Team	Pld	T	G	FG	P
1928–30	University	34	11	2	0	37
1933	Eastern Suburbs	15	1	0	0	3
1935	South Sydney	7	1	0	0	3
	Total	56	13	2	0	43
Representative
Years	Team	Pld	T	G	FG	P
1929	New South Wales	2	0	3	0	6
1933	NSW City	1	0	0	0	0
1932–34	NSW Country	3	1	0	0	3
- Source: As of 19 April 2023

Harleigh Hanrahan was an Australian former professional rugby league footballer who played in the 1920s and 1930s. He played for Eastern Suburbs, University and South Sydney in the NSWRL competition.

== Playing career ==
Hanrahan made his first grade debut for University in round 1 of the 1928 NSWRFL season against Eastern Suburbs at the Royal Agricultural Society Showground. Hanrahan spent three years at University with two of them seeing the team finish in last place. He was their top try scorer in the 1929 season. In 1933, he played one season with Eastern Suburbs where the club reached the preliminary final against St. George. In 1935, Hanrahan played one year at South Sydney but did not feature in their grand final loss to Eastern Suburbs. Hanrahan represented New South Wales twice in 1929. He also represented both NSW Country and NSW City. Hanrahan is also listed as playing for Jambaroo in the NSW Country competitions.
