= Hubert Finn =

Australian rugby league footballer

Personal information
- Full name: Hubert Clement Finn
- Born: 21 December 1900 Canowindra, New South Wales
- Died: 19 May 1952 (aged 51) Dover Heights, New South Wales

Playing information
- Position: Fullback
Club
Years	Team	Pld	T	G	FG	P
1920–26	University	77	9	8	0	43
Representative
Years	Team	Pld	T	G	FG	P
1925	New South Wales	1	0	0	0	0
1925	Metropolis	1	0	0	0	0

Hubert Clement 'Butt' Finn (1900-1952) was an Australian rugby league footballer who played in the 1920s and was also a physician.

== Background ==
Finn was born in Canowindra, New South Wales on 21 December 1900, the youngest son of Thomas and Maria Finn. He was educated at St Stanislaus College (Bathurst) and then at Sydney University to study medicine.

== Playing career ==
In the early 1920s and joined the Sydney University rugby league team for seven seasons between 1920 and 1926. He played Fullback, and the highlight of his career was his appearance in the 1926 Grand Final in which University lost to the South Sydney 11-6. He also captained the club on many occasions.

== Later life and death ==
Finn retired after the match, but went on to become the chief medical officer for the NSWRFL, a position he held until his death in 1952. Finn died suddenly at his home Wallangra Road, Dover Heights, New South Wales on 19 May 1952. At the time of his death he was chief medical officer of the N.S.W. Rugby League and the N.S.W. Trotting Club. He also held the rank of squadron leader in the RAAF during the war. He was survived by his wife, a son and a daughter.

A large gathering attended his funeral at St. Terese's Church, Dover Heights. Hubert 'Butt' Finn was buried at South Head Cemetery on 22 May 1952.
