= Vern Deacon =

Australian rugby league player

Personal information
- Full name: Vernon Deacon
- Born: 1908; Narromine, NSW, Australia
- Died: 11 September 1965; Turramurra, NSW, Australia

Playing information
- Position: Utility back
Club
Years	Team	Pld	T	G	FG	P
1926–28	University	24	10	0	0	30
1929	Balmain	14	8	0	0	24
	Total	38	18	0	0	54
Representative
Years	Team	Pld	T	G	FG	P
1928	NSW City	1	0	0	0	0

Vernon Deacon (1908 – 11 September 1965) was an Australian rugby league player.

Deacon was born in the town of Narromine and attended the nearby Dubbo High School, where he played on the same school rugby league side as future Wallabies representative Ron Walden.

A utility back, Deacon was a five-eighth in his first two seasons with University, then in 1928 began playing as both a fullback and winger. It was as a fullback that he represented NSW City against NSW Country in 1928. He competed for Balmain in the 1929 NSWRFL season, before moving to Kenebri to teach.
