= A.S. Lane =

Australian rugby league footballer

Alby Lane
Personal information
- Full name: Albert Stephen Lane
- Born: 21 March 1904 Balmain, New South Wales, Australia
- Died: 8 September 1982 (aged 78) Canberra, Australia

Playing information
- Position: Halfback
Club
Years	Team	Pld	T	G	FG	P
1924–28	University	42	6	0	0	18
Representative
Years	Team	Pld	T	G	FG	P
1925–28	New South Wales	8	1	0	0	3
1925	Metropolis	2	0	0	0	0
1928	NSW City	1	0	0	0	0

Albert Stephen 'Alby' Lane (21 March 1904 – 8 September 1982) was an Australian rugby league footballer who played in the 1920s.

== Playing career ==
Born at Balmain, New South Wales in 1904, Alby Lane, often known as 'Georgie' Lane was a half-back for the Sydney University rugby league team during the 1920s. He was the son of state politician Albert Lane.

He played four seasons for the club between 1924-1926 and 1928, whilst studying medicine at Sydney University. He captained University in their only Grand Final appearance in 1926.

He also represented New South Wales on eight occasions in 1925, 1926 and 1928.

== Post playing ==
Lane later ran his own Sydney medical practice. He then moved to Canberra and became the head of the Canberra Community Hospital.

== Death ==
Lane died in Canberra on 8 September 1982.
