= Jim Dunworth =

Australian rugby league footballer

Personal information
- Full name: Jim Dunworth

Playing information
- Position: Hooker, Prop, Second-row, Lock
Club
Years	Team	Pld	T	G	FG	P
1918–19	North Sydney	16	3	0	0	9
1921–24	University	42	9	0	0	27
1925	North Sydney	10	2	0	0	6
	Total	68	14	0	0	42
Representative
Years	Team	Pld	T	G	FG	P
1922–25	New South Wales	6	1	0	0	3
1923	Metropolis	1	0	0	0	0
- Source: As of 19 April 2023

Jim Dunworth was an Australian former professional rugby league footballer who played in the 1910s and 1920s. He played for North Sydney and University in the NSWRL competition.

== Playing career ==
Dunworth made his first-grade debut for North Sydney in round 1 of the 1918 NSWRFL season against South Sydney. Dunworth played two seasons with Norths with his last year at the club ending with a Wooden Spoon in 1919. In 1921, Dunworth began playing for University. Dunworth's time was not successful at University with the club finishing last three times. In 1925, he returned to North Sydney and played ten further matches. Dunworth represented New South Wales six times and also played one match for Metropolis, the early incarnation of the NSW City rugby league team.
