= Ross McKinnon =

Australian RL coach and former Australia international rugby league footballer

Personal information
- Full name: Ross Lachlan McKinnon
- Born: 15 April 1914 Oberon, New South Wales
- Died: 25 May 1962 (aged 48) Camperdown, New South Wales

Playing information
- Position: Centre, Five-eighth
Club
Years	Team	Pld	T	G	FG	P
1933–34	Sydney University	18	1	2	0	7
1935–38	Eastern Suburbs	23	9	11	0	49
1939–4?	Cessnock
	Total	41	10	13	0	56
Representative
Years	Team	Pld	T	G	FG	P
1933–37	New South Wales	7	0	2	0	4
1935–37	City NSW	3	1	3	0	9
1935–38	Australia	8	3	0	0	9
1939–40	Country NSW	2	1	4	0	11

Coaching information
Club
Years	Team	Gms	W	D	L	W%
1946–47	Canterbury-Bankstown	32	21	2	9	66
1952–53	North Sydney	36	21	1	14	58
1959	North Sydney	18	9		9	50
	Total	86	51	3	32	59

Ross McKinnon (1914-1962) was an Australian rugby league footballer and coach. Born in Oberon, New South Wales, he played for the University, Eastern Suburbs, New South Wales and for the Australian national side.

== Playing career ==
McKinnon, who attended Sydney Boys High, graduating in 1932, started playing at the University club as a five-eighth. He then joined Eastern Suburbs and played with them for four seasons between 1935 and 1938, and won two premierships with them in 1935 and 1937.

McKinnon was selected to go on the 1937-38 Kangaroo tour. He is listed on the Australian Players Register as Kangaroo No. 195.

After McKinnon finished playing in Australia's major rugby league competition – the NSWRL he moved to the more rural locality of Cessnock, New South Wales where the Centre played out the remainder of his career as the captain coach of that side. He took them to a Newcastle Rugby League's grand final victory in 1941.

== Post playing ==
McKinnon later returned to Sydney and coached Canterbury-Bankstown, taking them to the play-offs in 1946 and in 1947 to the Grand final. He also coached North Sydney in 1952, 1953 and 1959.

In 1962, at the age of 48, following an operation on a brain tumor he died of coronary occlusion.

Although he was married twice, McKinnon was never able to have children due to injuries.
