= Gordon Favelle =

Australian rugby league footballer and coach

Personal information
- Full name: Gordon Benjamin Favelle
- Born: 19 August 1912 Beechworth, Victoria, Commonwealth of Australia
- Died: 4 September 1987 (aged 75) Newcastle, New South Wales, Australia

Playing information
- Position: Lock, Five-eighth
Club
Years	Team	Pld	T	G	FG	P
1932–34	University	31	16	8	0	64
1935	Eastern Suburbs	4	2	4	0	14
	Total	35	18	12	0	78
Representative
Years	Team	Pld	T	G	FG	P
1933	NSW City	1	0	0	0	0

Gordon Benjamin Favelle (1912–1987) was an Australian professional rugby league footballer who played in the 1930s. He played in the New South Wales Rugby League (NSWRL).

== Early life ==
Birth records show "Gordon Benjamin Favell", born on 19 August 1912 in Beechworth, Victoria, Commonwealth of Australia. He was the son of butcher William John Favell (b. 1876 in Beeac, Victoria, Colony of New South Wales, d. 16 Jun 1949 in Bondi Junction) and his wife Bridget Hartney (b. about 1877 in County Kerry or County Limerick, Ireland), who arrived in Brisbane on 14 November 1899.

His paternal grandparents were James Favell, who had arrived in New South Wales on 3 June 1864 at the age of 25 from New Zealand, and Mary Ryan. His older sister Margaret Brereton Favell (b. 1907 in Beechworth, d. 13 September 1997) married James William Stent in 1943 in New South Wales.

== Playing career ==
Originally a Christian Brothers Waverley student, Favelle played for Sydney University rugby league team between 1932 and 1934 and holds the record for being the youngest first grade player-coach at age 20 during the 1933 NSWRFL season. His only representative match was for N.S.W. City Firsts in 1933.

Favelle also played for the Eastern Suburbs club in the 1935 NSWRFL season, the year the club won its fifth Premiership. He finished his career as captain-coach of Newcastle Easts and Kurri Kurri in the late 1930s.

He is recognized as Eastern Suburbs player No. 241.

== Personal life ==
Gordon was one of the pallbearers at the funeral of rugby league footballer Ray Morris on 23 September 1933.

Recorded as Gordon Benjamin Patrick Favell, in 1939 he married Tita Frances Fortington (b. 25 June 1917, d. 19 January 1999 in Newcastle), daughter of Leslie Francis Fortington (1891–1950) and Eliza Isabel Watts (b. 1870).

They enjoyed living in the Newcastle metropolitan area. In 1963, Gordon and his wife were proprietors of a coffee lounge with their son Anthony Gordon Favell as assistant. Gordon Benjamin Favell is listed with the occupation of clerk on the Electoral Rolls when they lived in New Lambton in 1968. In the 1980s, they lived in Kotara South.
