= Sid Mannix =

Australian rugby league footballer (1910–1986)

Personal information
- Full name: Sydney Edward Mannix
- Born: 13 July 1910 Paddington, New South Wales, Australia
- Died: 2 May 1986 (aged 75)

Playing information
- Position: Wing
Club
Years	Team	Pld	T	G	FG	P
1930–32	Sydney University	36	8	0	0	24
1935	South Sydney	1	0	0	0	0
	Total	37	8	0	0	24

Sydney Edward Mannix (13 July 1910 – 2 May 1986) was an Australian rugby league footballer.

Born in Paddington, Mannix had a background in athletics and was associated with the Kensington club. He competed in sprint events and was at one time a relay teammate of Olympian James Carlton.

Mannix played first–grade rugby league for Sydney University from 1930 to 1932. Although utilised mainly on a wing, Mannix could also play centre and five–eighth. He subsequently plied his trade in Newcastle, before returning to Sydney in 1935 to play for South Sydney. His time with the Rabbitohs was brief and after just one first–grade appearance left to coach Moree. He moved on to Canowindra in 1936 and represented Western Division that year against the touring Great Britain national team.
