= Jim Ward (rugby league) =

Australian rugby league footballer (1896–1928)

Personal information
- Full name: James Goethe Ward
- Born: 1896 Sydney, New South Wales, Australia
- Died: 17 March 1928 (aged 31–32) Katoomba, New South Wales, Australia

Playing information

Rugby union
Club
Years	Team	Pld	T	G	FG	P
191?–20	Randwick

Rugby league
- Position: Lock, Centre, Second-row, Wing
Club
Years	Team	Pld	T	G	FG	P
1919–20	North Sydney	15	1	25	0	53
1921–27	University	36	7	9	0	39
	Total	51	8	34	0	92
- Source: As of 18 June 2019

James Goethe Ward (1896-1928) was an Australian rugby league and rugby union footballer who played in the 1910s and 1920s.

== Career ==
Ward, who was employed at the Weather Bureau, began his football career with the Randwick Rugby Union team.

Later he played Rugby League with North Sydney (1919-1920), and University (1921-22, 1926-27) in which he played in the 1926 Grand Final.

== Death ==
Ward died at Katoomba on 17 March 1928.
