= 1937 NSWRFL season =

Rugby league competition

1937 New South Wales Rugby Football League
- Teams: 9
- Premiers: Eastern Suburbs (7th title)
- Minor premiers: Eastern Suburbs (8th title)
- Matches played: 36
- Points scored: 1088
- Top points scorer(s): Jack Beaton (56)
- Wooden spoon: University (10th spoon)
- Top try-scorer(s): Fred Tottey (10)

The 1937 New South Wales Rugby Football League premiership was the 30th season of the Sydney, New South Wales-based top-grade rugby league club competition, Australia's first. Nine teams from across the city contested the premiership during the season, which lasted from April until June, with Eastern Suburbs being crowned champions.

== Season summary ==
The 1937 season only lasted eight rounds due to the Kangaroo tour, and used a “first past the post” system to determine the premiers. There were no Finals. The second half of what would normally have been the NSWRFL season was taken up with a City Cup competition.

Eastern Suburbs won their seventh Premiership going through the season undefeated – a feat achieved by teams in only five other seasons before or since. Having won only two matches in four seasons and only fifteen (plus two draws) in the nine seasons since 1929, the University club withdrew voluntarily from the premiership at the end of the season.

=== Teams ===
1937 proved University’s final NSWRFL season. After being allowed one more season to prove themselves, the Students did not win a match in any grade, scoring only 41 points in first grade, 39 in reserves, and 21 in third grade – in which University veterans were allowed to play the second half of the last match as a farewell.

- Balmain, formed on January 23, 1908, at Balmain Town Hall
- Canterbury-Bankstown
- Eastern Suburbs, formed on January 24, 1908, at Paddington Town Hall
- Newtown, formed on January 14, 1908
- North Sydney, formed on February 7, 1908
- South Sydney, formed on January 17, 1908, at Redfern Town Hall
- St. George, formed on November 8, 1920, at Kogarah School of Arts
- University, formed in 1919 at Sydney University
- Western Suburbs, formed on February 4, 1908

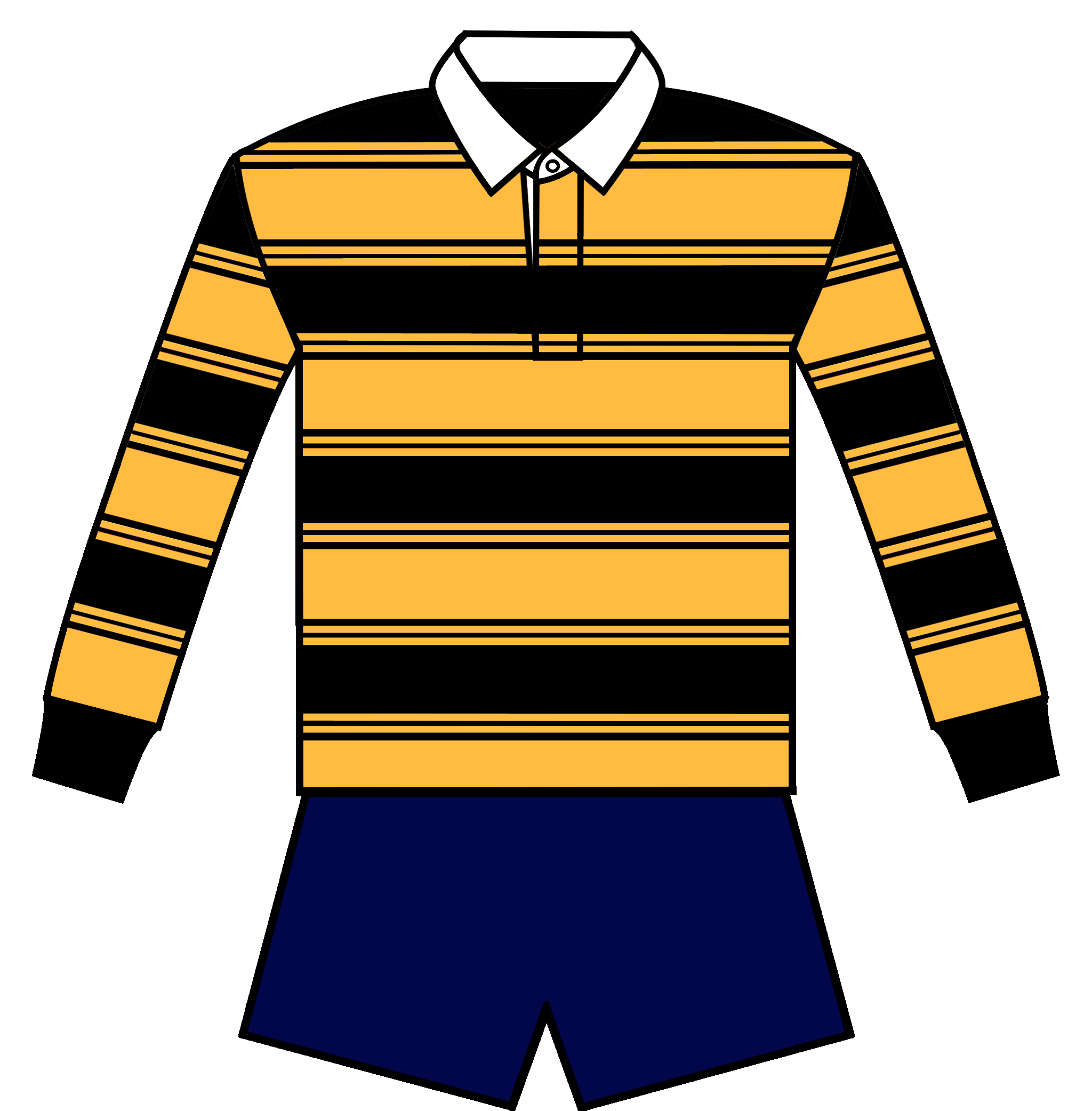
Balmain 30th season Ground: Leichhardt Oval; Coach: Harold Matthews; Captain(s): Jim Duckworth, Jack Redman

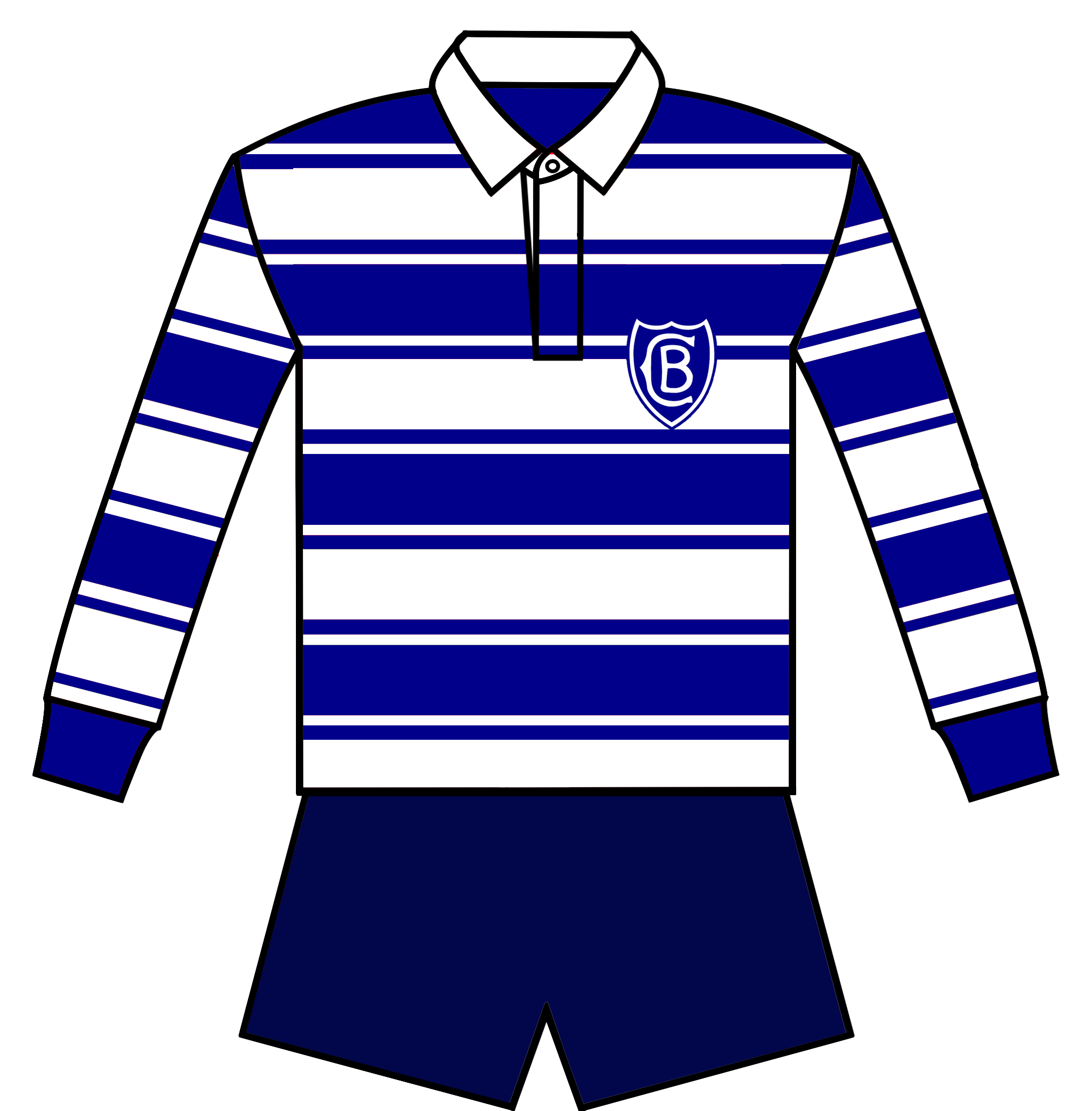
Canterbury-Bankstown 3rd season Ground: Belmore Oval; Coach: George Mason; Captain: Alan Brady

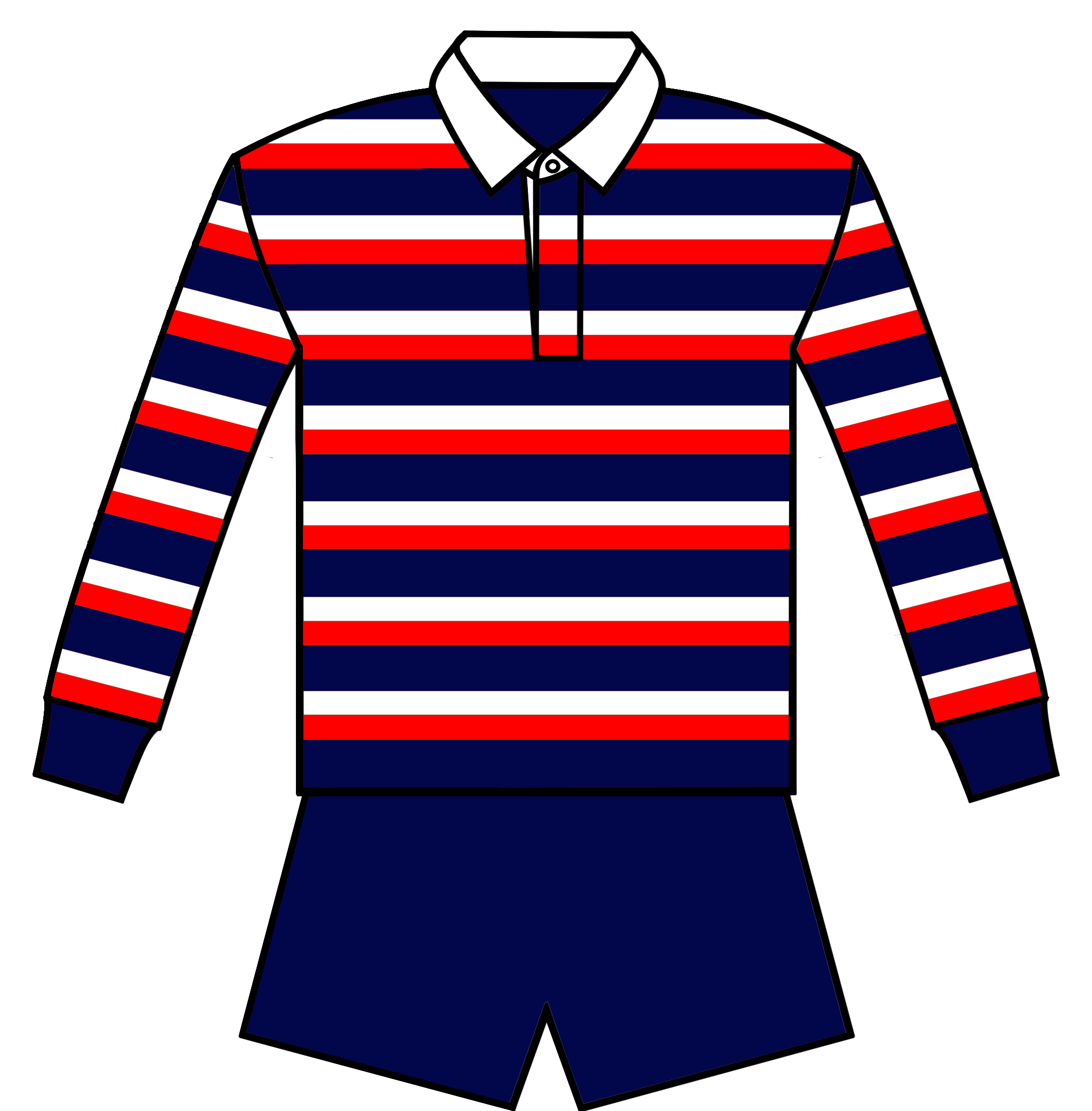
Eastern Suburbs 30th season Ground: Sydney Cricket Ground; Coach: Arthur Halloway; Captain: Viv Thicknesse

Newtown 30th season Ground:Henson Park; Coach: Bill Kelly; Captain: Herb Narvo

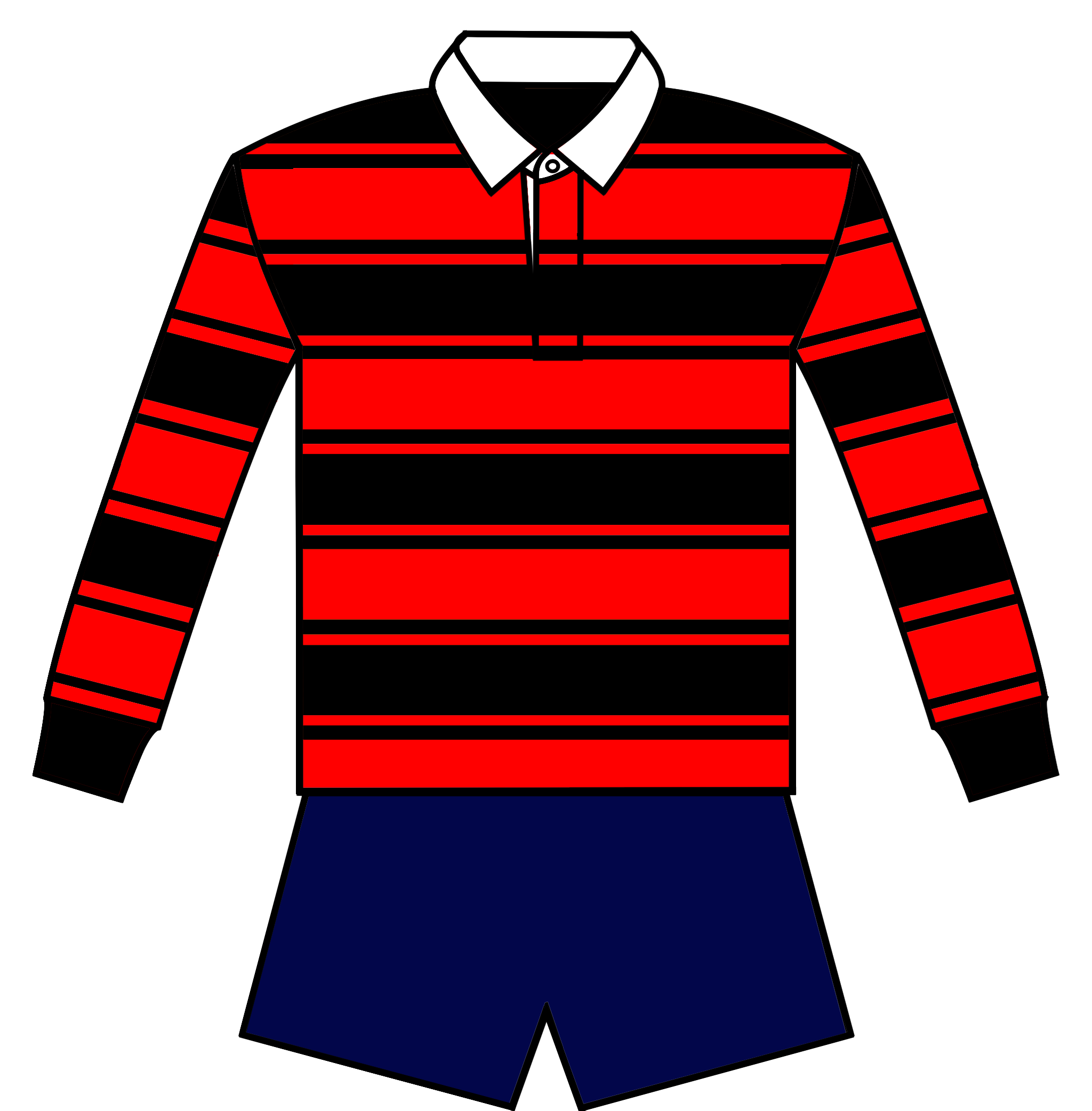
North Sydney 30th season Ground: North Sydney Oval; Captain-Coach: Laurie Ward

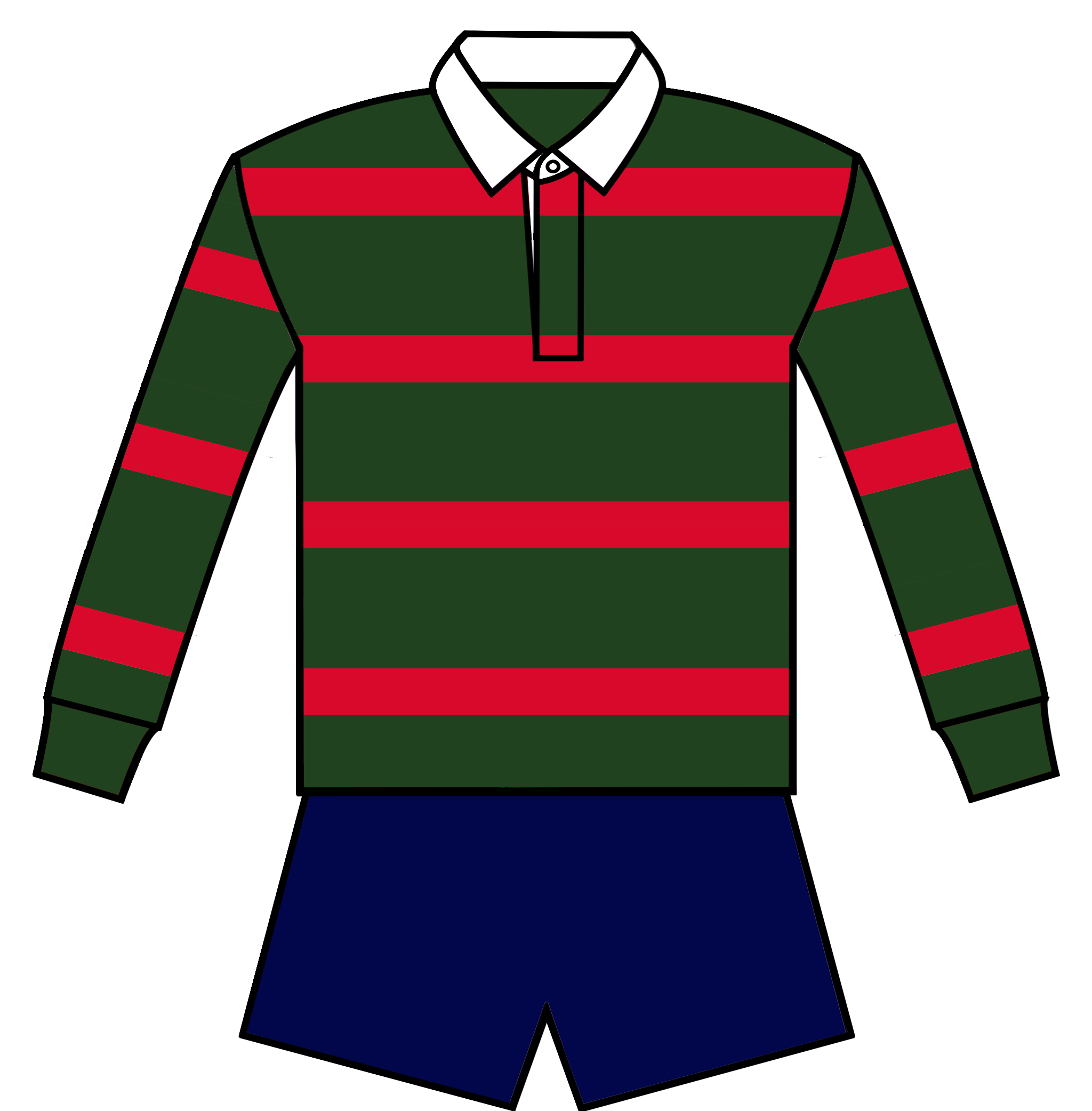
South Sydney 30th season Ground: Sydney Sports Ground; Coach: Charlie Lynch; Captain: Eric Lewis

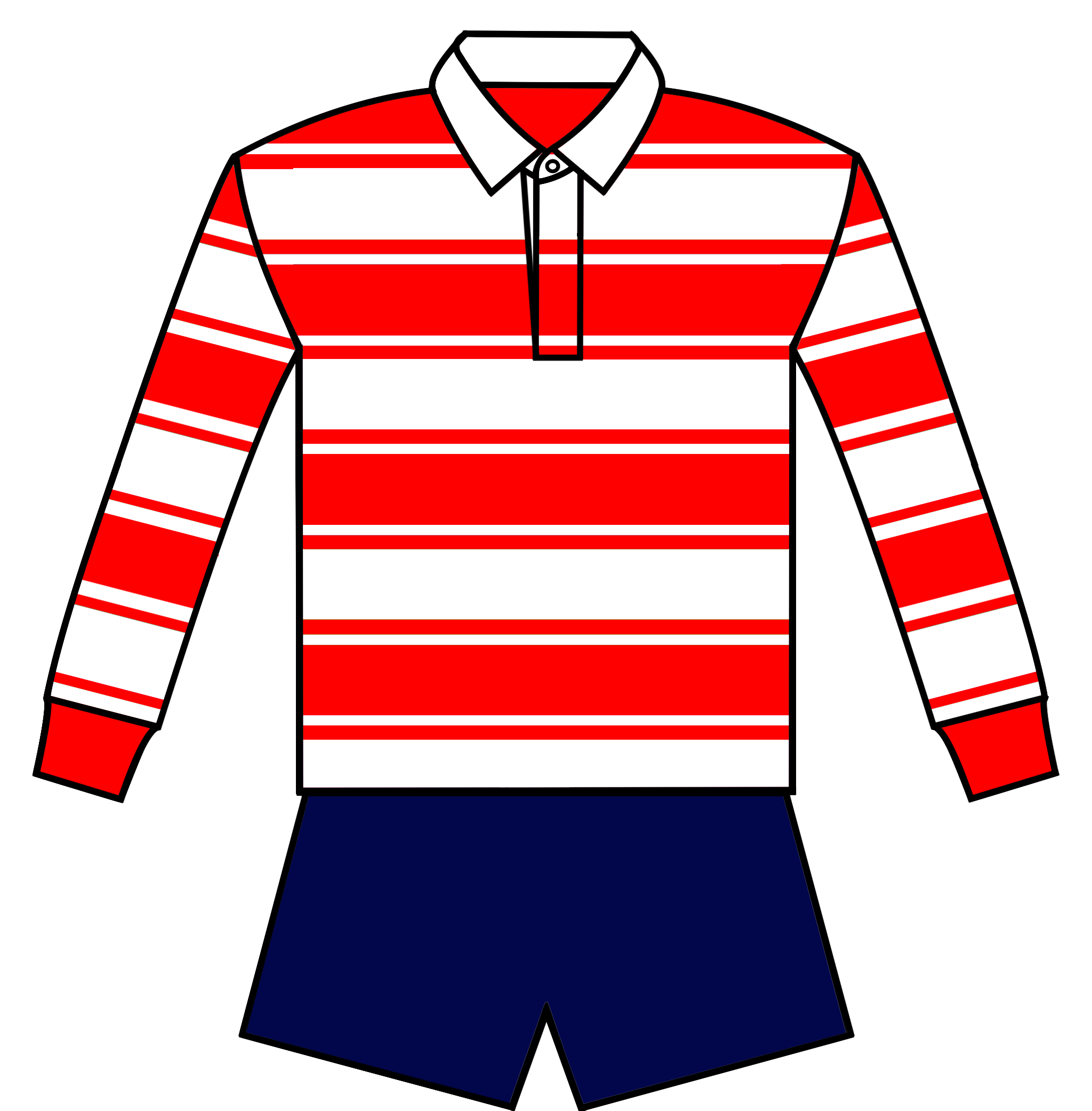
St. George 17th season Ground: Earl Park; Coach: Peter Burge / Norm Pope; Captain: Norm Pope & Percy Fairall

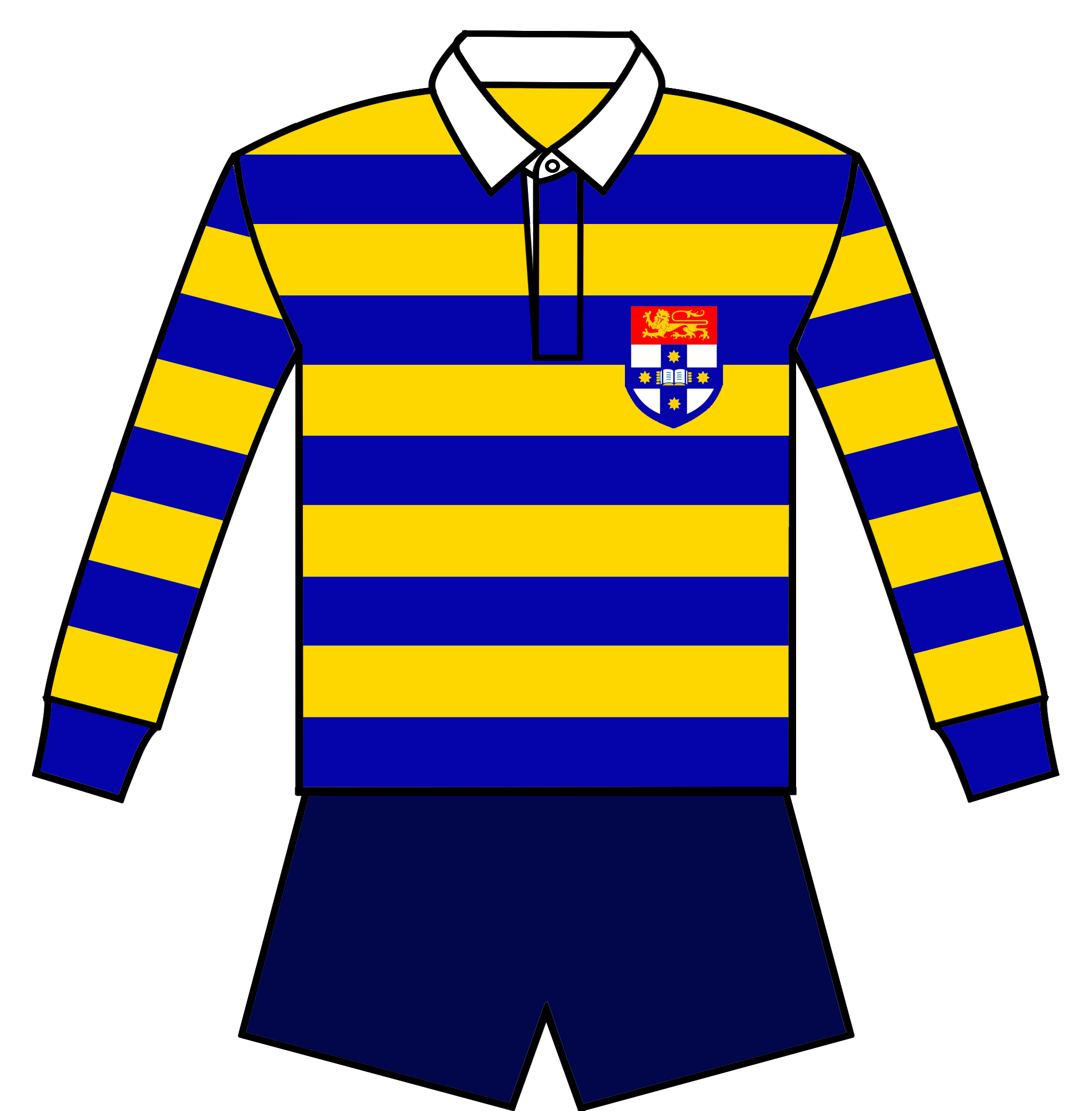
University 18th season Coach: Bob "Botsy" Williams; Captain: Tom Carey

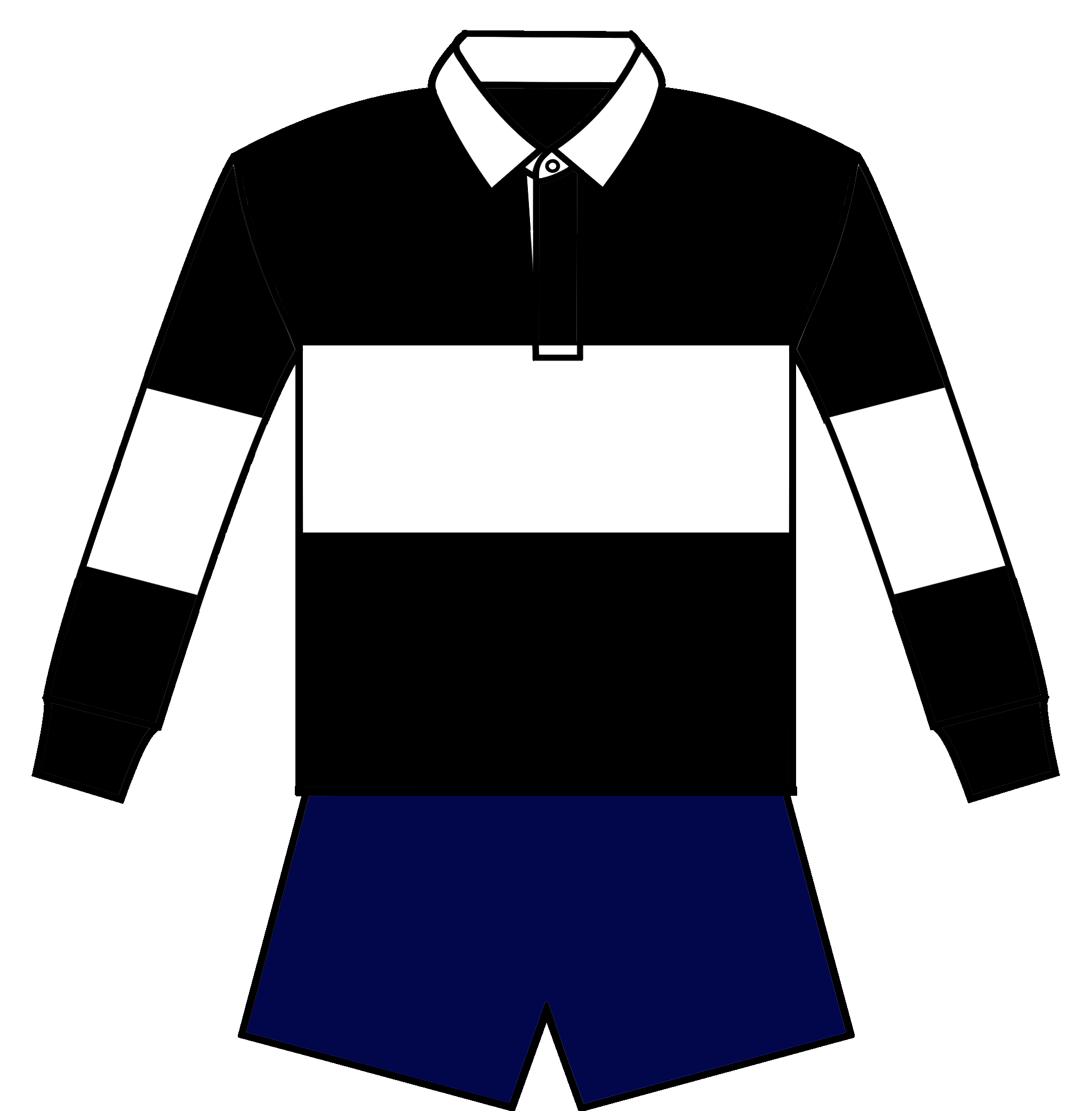
Western Suburbs 30th season Ground: Pratten Park; Coach: Jerry Brien; Captain: Cliff Pearce

== Ladder ==
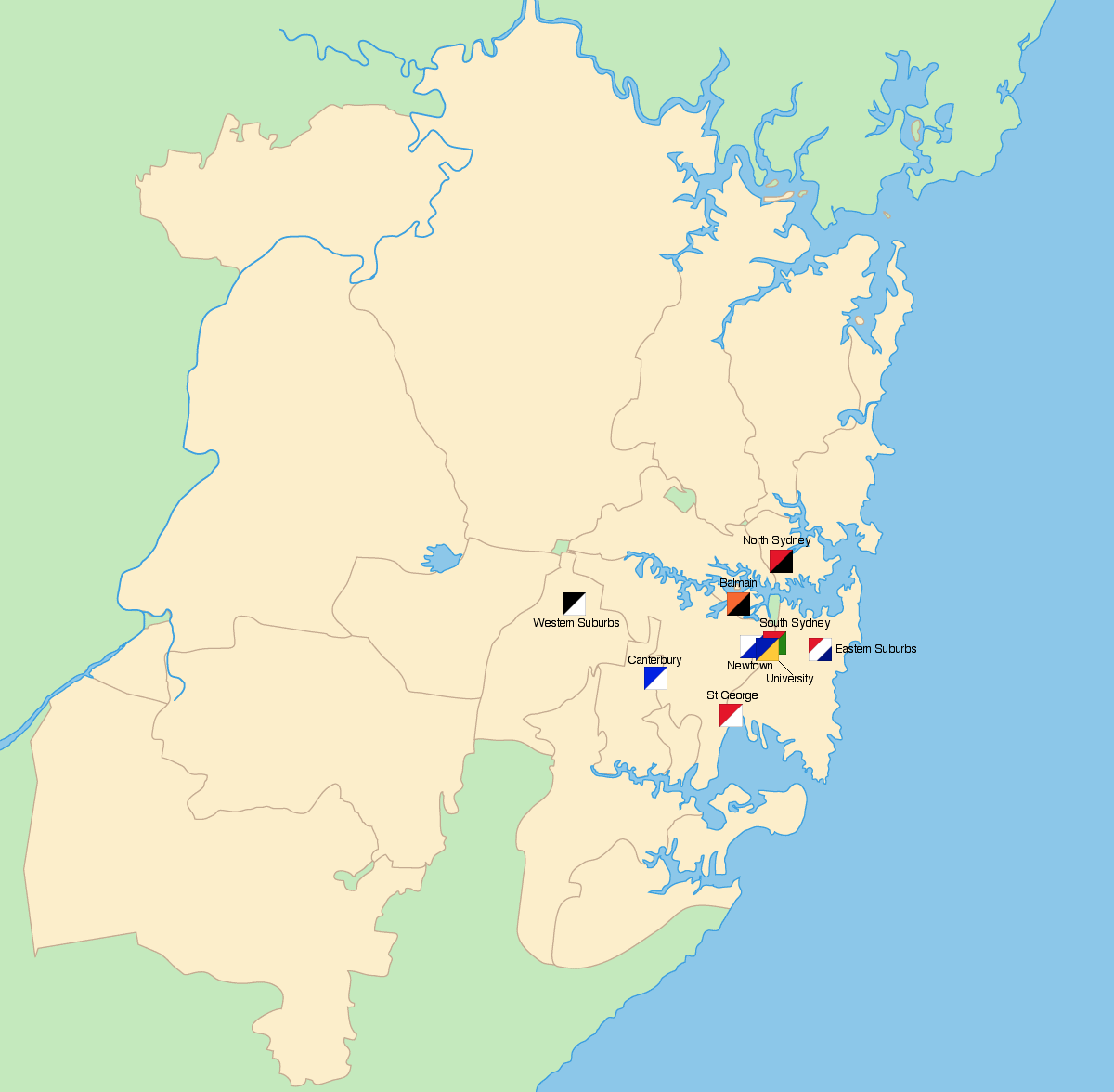
The geographical locations of the teams that contested the 1937 premiership across Sydney.

	Team	Pld	W	D	L	B	PF	PA	PD	Pts
1	Eastern Suburbs	8	6	2	0	1	187	56	+131	16
2	South Sydney	8	5	1	2	1	164	58	+106	13
3	St. George	8	5	1	2	1	151	92	+59	13
4	Newtown	8	4	0	4	1	144	126	+18	10
5	Canterbury	8	4	0	4	1	98	91	+7	10
6	Balmain	8	4	0	4	1	115	136	-21	10
7	North Sydney	8	3	0	5	1	84	94	-10	8
8	Western Suburbs	8	3	0	5	1	104	126	-22	8
9	Sydney University	8	0	0	8	1	41	309	-268	2
