= George Cummins (rugby league) =

Australian rugby league player (1886–1953)

Personal information
- Born: 17 June 1886 Port Macquarie, NSW, Australia
- Died: 14 February 1953 (aged 66) Marrickville, NSW, Australia

Playing information
- Weight: 14 st 0 lb (89 kg)
- Position: Hooker, Prop, Second-row
Club
Years	Team	Pld	T	G	FG	P
1912–15	Balmain Tigers	50	7	50	0	121
1921	Sydney University	7	1	0	0	3
	Total	57	8	50	0	124
Representative
Years	Team	Pld	T	G	FG	P
1912–13	New South Wales	4	1	4	0	11
- Military career
- Allegiance: Australia
- Branch: Australian Army
- Service years: 1916-1919; 1939-1945
- Rank: Lieutenant (WW1); Major (WW2)
- Units: 55th Battalion; Royal Australian Army Medical Corps
- Conflicts: World War I; Western Front; Attack at Fromelles; World War II

George Cummins (17 June 1886 – 14 February 1953) was an Australian rugby league player.

Cummins was raised on Dumaresq Island on the Manning River as the eldest of three siblings. His father Albert, who died when Cummins was eight, crewed a tug boat which would tow vessels to nearby localities, while his mother Sarah (Downton) was a nurse who later set up a maternity hospital in Taree.

A 14 stone forward, Cummins started out in rugby union and switched to rugby league when he moved to Sydney to attend a teacher's college. He joined Balmain and made a big enough impact during his first season in 1912 that he earned a place in the state side which toured New Zealand that year. In 1915, Cummins missed only one match in a premiership–winning season for Balmain, with his 46 points bettered only by Charles Fraser.

Cummins' career was interrupted by World War I service and in 1916 he left for France as a Lieutenant with the 55th Battalion. He was captured during the fighting at Fromelles and spent three years as a German prisoner of war. Although he had better living conditions as an officer, Cummins still lost considerable weight in captivity and was suffering from pneumonia at the time he was repatriated in January 1919.

Following the war, Cummins studied medicine at the University of Sydney and briefly played rugby league for University. He qualified as a doctor in 1928 and moved to Bega to practise medicine. During World War II, Cummins was a major in the Australian Army Medical Corps and served at an army hospital in Bathurst. He was at one time the Sydney University rugby union coach and led them to the 1945 Shute Shield title.

Cummins died at his home on Stanmore road in Marrickville at the age of 66 in 1953.
