= Isidor Sender =

Australian rugby league player

Personal information
- Full name: Isidor Harry Sender
- Born: 8 November 1905 Leeds, England
- Died: 14 May 1943 (aged 37) At sea, near Brisbane

Playing information
- Position: Hooker
Club
Years	Team	Pld	T	G	FG	P
1923–27	University	7	0	0	0	0
- Military career
- Allegiance: Australia
- Branch: Australian Army
- Service years: 1940-1943
- Unit: Royal Australian Army Medical Corps
- Conflicts: World War II

Isidor Harry Sender (8 November 1905 – 14 May 1943) was an Australian doctor, soldier and rugby league player.

Born in Leeds, England, Sender grew up in a Jewish family in Sydney. His father, Leslie, served as treasurer of the Great Synagogue. He was educated at Fort Street High School and the University of Sydney, where he graduated with a medical degree. Primarily a hooker, Sender played rugby league for University in the NSWRFL and in 1924 toured New Zealand with an Australian Universities representative side.

Sender enlisted into the Australian Army in 1940 and served initially with the Light Horse Brigade, before transferring to an ambulance unit. He died in the 1943 sinking off the Queensland coast of the hospital ship AHS Centaur, which had been transporting his unit to New Guinea. The ship was torpedoed by the Japanese.
