= Frank Benning =

Australian rugby league footballer and administrator

Personal information
- Full name: Herbert Francis Benning
- Born: 5 May 1907 Gunnedah, New South Wales
- Died: 8 February 1990 (aged 82) Cronulla, New South Wales

Playing information
- Position: Hooker, Second-row
Club
Years	Team	Pld	T	G	FG	P
1926–1930	University	66	5	0	0	15
Representative
Years	Team	Pld	T	G	FG	P
1930	Metropolis	1	0	0	0	0

Herbert Francis Benning OBE (1907-8 February 1990) was an Australian rugby league player and administrator.

== Playing career ==
Benning was a forward that played with the University for five seasons between 1926 and 1930.

Benning played for University in the 1926 NSWRL grand final against South Sydney which University lost 11–5 at the Royal Agricultural Society Grounds in front of 20,000 spectators.

== Administrative career ==
After excelling at Rugby League he became interested in administration, and he became the club secretary of the University club in 1930, a position that he retained until the club folded in 1937. He was awarded an OBE in 1969 for services to the community.

== Death ==
Benning died on 8 February 1990, aged 82.
