= Ed Wynter =

Australian rugby league footballer

Edward James Collins Wynter (1904–1974) was an Australian professional rugby league footballer for the University club in the New South Wales Rugby League premiership competition.

Wynter died in Lane Cove on 16 August 1974, aged 70.

== Career playing statistics ==
=== Point scoring summary ===
Games	Tries	Goals	F/G	Points
13	1	-	-	4

=== Matches played ===
Team	Matches	Years
University	13	1926 & 1928
