= Sydney University Rugby League Football Club =

Australian rugby league club, based in Sydney, NSW

Sydney University
Club information
- Full name: Sydney University Rugby League Football Club
- Founded: 1920; 106 years ago
- Exited: 1937; 89 years ago

Former details
- Competition: New South Wales Rugby Football League
- 1937: 9th of 9
- Team colours

Records
- Premierships: Nil
- Runners-up: 1 – 1926
- Minor premierships: Nil
- Wooden spoons: 10 – 1921, 1923, 1927, 1929, 1930, 1931, 1934, 1935, 1936, 1937

The Sydney University Rugby League Football Club (SURLFC) is a rugby league team currently playing in the Saturday Metro League competition. The University of Sydney was represented in the New South Wales Rugby Football League (premiership) (NSWRL) from 1920 to 1937 as University, and also in the NSWRL Second Division and Metropolitan League competitions from 1963 to 1976.

== History ==
The inaugural by-laws of the NSWRL premiership in 1908 included provision for a SURLFC. However, it was not until 1919 that movements at the University of Sydney to be involved in the new game of rugby league began.

In February 1920 the NSWRL met with the rugby union aligned Sydney University Football Club (SUFC) hoping they would switch codes as the extent of support for club rugby union in Australia was now down to the SUFC and just five other cobbled together 1919 Sydney first grade teams, and there was a palpable rise in preference for rugby league among the SUFC's younger footballers. NSWRL officials James Joynton Smith, Fred Flowers and Horrie Miller held discussions with SUFC representatives retired Wallabies Herbert "Paddy" Moran and Hyram Marks along with Eric Mortley Fisher. When the SUFC subsequently decided to stay loyal to the NSW Rugby Union, elements within the SUFC took their own action.

As put by Herbert Vere Evatt (a final year law student and later a politician, jurist and president of the UN General Assembly) at the time the reasons were:

"Owing to the general dissatisfaction with the management of the Rugby Union during the 1919 football season, and the fact that University footballers were starting to realise that rugby league was a faster and cleaner game, several leading members of the football club, including seven 'blues' of the past season, took steps to introduce the league game into the University for the 1920 season. A special meeting of league supporters was held and decided to enter three teams, all members to play as strict amateurs."

The club wore the University sports colours of blue and gold in the same hooped jerseys playing strip of the SUFC. However, unlike the SUFC, the SURLFC maintained the Oxbridge universities' rugby traditions of confining teams to undergraduates only. Upon graduating, the rugby league players would move from SURLFC to another club or retire.

=== Anti-rugby league prejudice ===
From the very beginning of the SURLFC, the Students (or 'Varsity' as they were also known) struggled to gain acceptance by the University Sports Association who displayed great prejudice toward those who wished to play rugby league.

Although the University students received no payment for taking part in SURLFC matches, they were strongly reminded by detractors that if they intended to later continue their studies at the Oxbridge universities in England, they would soon find there that their having played rugby league was sufficient to mean they were professionals and not amateurs, preventing their participating in rugby union, rowing or other sports and gaining of a 'Blue'.

On the same basis, the University's Sports Association forbid the SURLFC from training and playing on the University Oval (forcing Varsity to train with Eastern Suburbs at the Sydney Sports Ground), even though it had been leased during the war to the NSW Football Association (soccer). The view was that the Oval could not be used by a professional sport such as first grade rugby league. While public pressure soon forced the Association to relent in regard to training, the SURLFC never once played a game at the University Oval during its involvement in the NSWRL premiership. In 1931 the Sports Association were finally persuaded by NSWRL officials to enter into an agreement for nine SURLFC home games on the Oval that season, however the deal was made futile when the University's Senate refused approval.

=== Inter-varsity rugby league matches and representative football ===
The only exceptions granted for the use of the University Oval for rugby league were for less than a handful of representative matches. Two games were played on the Oval by the 'Combined Australian Universities' selection in 1922 (against 'Metropolis') and 1930 (versus New Zealand). The combined XIII was chosen from SURLFC players and those of the University of Queensland rugby club (UQRC) which had switched to rugby league. The SURLFC and UQRC commenced annual contests in 1920, with the first held at the Sydney Cricket Ground in front of 50,000 spectators on the under-card to NSW Blues v England.The Melbourne University rugby club also changed allegiance to rugby league during 1923 to 1925, resulting in further inter-varsity matches, including a tri-series in Sydney in 1924, and the Australian Universities team having representatives from all three universities of the mainland eastern states. Tours to New Zealand were made in 1922 and 1924 by the Australian Universities rugby league team. The final Sydney and Brisbane (Queensland) inter-varsity game under rugby league appears to have been the contest held in 1929 on the University Oval for the Alan Maclean Memorial Shield.The SURLFC also undertook many tours of regional NSW and throughout Queensland to play local clubs and representative sides.

=== 1926 Grand Final ===
The highlight of the Students' 18 seasons in the NSWRL Premiership was their one and only finals appearance (having finished fourth in the regular season). To get to the Grand Final at the Sydney Agricultural Ground University had to defeat Glebe which they did comfortably 29 - 3. In the Grand Final, however, they were defeated 5–11 by Souths in front of 20,000 people.

Year	Premiers	Runners-up	Score
1926	South Sydney	University	11–5

=== Withdrawal from the Premiership ===
Chart of yearly table positions for Sydney University in First Grade NSWRL

Generally, the amateur students struggled to perform against the professional players of the other sides and University enjoyed very little success only winning 44 of its 226 games during its time in the Premiership (and only won 2 games after 1933). The club did not win a single match in 1935, continuing a losing streak that started in round 2, 1934 and which would run till round 14, 1936 and which marked the most consecutive losses in NSWRL/NRL premiership history at 42. This run of form, in addition to having spent 12 of its 18 seasons in last place prompted their decision to withdraw from the Premiership at the close of the 1937 season.

== Life after the Premiership ==
Rugby league did not perish at the University of Sydney and sides representing the university continued to play in various competitions. Most notably, Varsity played in the NSWRL Inter-District Competition, Second Division and Metropolitan League (predecessors to the Jim Beam Cup) between 1964 and 1976, finishing as Second Division runners-up in 1969 and 1971, both times to the leading side of the day Wentworthville.

Year	Premiers	Runners-up	Score
1969	Wentworthville Magpies	University	20–2
1971	Wentworthville Magpies	University	21–15

Year	Competition	Ladder			Finals Position	All Match Record						
Year	Competition	Pos	Byes	Pts	Finals Position	P	W	L	D	For	Agst	Diff
1964	Second Division	7	0	12		18	6	12	0	248	277	-29
1965	Second Division	9	0	7		17	3	14	1	177	386	-209
1966	Second Division	7	0	4		14	2	12	0	32	313	-281
1967	Second Division	4	0	16	Semi-Finalist	15	8	7	0	146	159	-13
1968	Second Division	3	2	22	Semi-Finalist	17	11	6	0	263	163	100
1969	Second Division	3	0	24	Grand Finalist	19	14	5	0	213	202	11
1970	Second Division	4	2	28	Semi-Finalist	21	14	7	0	322	248	74
1971	Second Division	2	2	35	Grand Finalist	22	18	3	1	578	255	323
1972	Second Division	5	2	25	Play-Off	21	10	10	1	435	349	86
1973	Second Division	9	2	12		20	4	16	0	202	565	-363
1974	Metropolitan Cup	5		18		21	8	11	2	274	324	-50
1975	Metropolitan Cup	3	2	23	Finalist	18	12	5	1	498	285	213
1976	Metropolitan Cup	5	0	12		16	5	9	2	256	343	-87

=== Wills Cup ===
As runners-up in the 1969 Second Division, University (along with Wentworthville) were invited to compete in the NSWRL pre-season competition (the Wills Cup) in 1970.

Despite the inclusion of mature players from other metropolitan University clubs and professional coaches, the sides were too inexperienced and light to compete with the senior club sides. University finished 13th (above last-placed Penrith) in the competition with 1 win from 4 games (their lone win, a close 19–17 victory, came against Wentworthville), with a points differential of -29.

=== University Shield Competition ===
In 1922 the University of Sydney Club presented the league with a shield for use as a trophy in a statewide High School Rugby League knockout competition. The competition became known as the 'University Shield' and is widely regarded as one of the most prestigious competitions in schoolboy rugby league.

The University Shield has undergone various changes in format since its inception in 1922, the most notable of these having been the exclusion of specialised 'Sports High Schools' which dominated the competition between 1996 and 2006 in a spirit deemed 'untrue' to the traditional concept of the competition.

=== Sydney Shield ===
In December 2018, it was revealed that University would be competing in the Sydney Shield competition. At the end of the 2019 Sydney Shield season, University finished 10th on the table. Due to the COVID-19 pandemic, University were initially meant to compete in the 2021 Sydney Shield but pulled out for financial reasons.

Year	Competition	Ladder			Finals Position	All Match Record						
Year	Competition	Pos	Byes	Pts	Finals Position	P	W	L	D	For	Agst	Diff
2019	Sydney Shield	10	1	11		20	4	15	1	397	744	-347
2020	Sydney Shield	N/A	0	0	Competition Cancelled	1	0	1	0	20	24	-4
2020	Sydney Shield	7	1	7		8	2	5	1	176	218	-42

== University Shield Honour Board (1922–2007) ==
Year	Premiers
1922	Goulburn
1923	Goulburn
1924	Goulburn
1925	Sydney Technical
1926	Tamworth
1927	Tamworth
1928	Tamworth
1929	Tamworth
1930	Randwick
1931	Tamworth
1932	Newcastle
1933	Cessnock
1934	Combined
1935	Newcastle
1936	Newcastle
1937	Cessnock
1938	Cessnock
1939	Newcastle
1940	Newcastle
1941	Newcastle
1942	Newcastle
1943	Newcastle
1944	Sydney Technical
1945	Sydney Technical
1946	Newcastle
1947	Maitland
1948	Taree
1949	Gosford
1950	Gosford
1951	Gosford
1952	Gosford
1953	Muswellbrook
1954	Newcastle
1955	Gosford
1956	Newcastle
1957	Tamworth
1958	Newcastle
1959	Newcastle
1960	Newcastle
1961	Tamworth
1962	Newcastle
1963	Newcastle Tech
1964	Tamworth
1965	Tamworth
1966	Griffith
1967	Orange
1968	Orange/Tamworth
1969	Tamworth
1970	Yanco Ag.
1971	Tamworth
1972	Yanco Ag.
1973	Moree
1974	Gosford
1975	Tamworth
1976	Ashcroft
1977	Ashcroft
1978	Tamworth
1978	Blacktown
1980	Chatham
1981	Chatham
1982	James Cook
1983	James Cook
1984	Ashcroft
1985	Ashcroft
1986	Toormina
1987	Yanco Ag.
1988	Melville
1989	James Cook
1990	Yanco Ag.
1991	Dubbo South
1992	Yanco Ag.
1993	Kingsgrove
1994	Kingsgrove
1995	Sarah Redfern
1996	Yanco Ag.
1997	Camden
1998	Westfield Sports
1999	Westfield Sports
2000	Westfield Sports
2001	Westfield Sports
2002	Endeavour Sports
2003	Farrer Ag.
2004	Endeavour Sports
2005	Westfield Sports
2006	Hunter Sports
2007	Junee High School

== Players ==
=== NSWRFL (1920–1937) ===
Name	First Yr	Last Yr	Apps	Tries	Goals	FG	Pts
Frank Ainsworth	1937	1937	7				
John Allison	1920	1920	9	2			6
P. Anderson	1930	1930	2				
John Austin	1920	1920	10	1			3
W. Austin	1920	1920	7	2			6
Edmund Barker	1937	1937	4				
John Barry	1927	1930	14	1			3
Tom Barry	1922	1927	61	15	1		47
John Bassetti	1925	1926	6				
Arthur Beckhouse	1935	1935	3				
John Beckley	1934	1935	25	3	6		21
Noel Behl	1930	1932	7				
Frank Benning	1926	1930	67	5			15
Anthony Blomgren	1935	1937	32	3			9
Greg Bondietti	1927	1929	13	1			3
Bert Bowen	1936	1937	10				
John Brennan	1929	1930	9	2			6
Bill Brewer	1932	1934	7	1			3
J. Bridgman	1924	1925	22				
George Brown	1929	1929	5				
J. Bryant	1928	1928	3				
H. Buckland	1931	1931	2				
Frank Buckley	1929	1930	27		1		2
P. Burke	1930	1930	1	1			3
Vince Byrne	1920	1922	9				
E. Cahill	1920	1920	3				
J. Callaghan	1930	1930	2				
A. Callan	1920	1921	10	1			3
Hugh Campbell	1936	1937	21	2			6
R. Campbell	1922	1922	2				
Tom Carey	1937	1937	16	4	5		22
Roy Cloutier	1920	1920	5				
Jim Comans	1932	1936	37	4			12
Paddy Conaghan	1921	1922	25	9			27
J. Condon	1937	1937	3				
James Connolly	1930	1930	1				
Arthur Connor	1926	1927	14	3			9
Russell Cooper	1934	1935	22				
T. Corbett	1920	1920	4				
Hector Courtenay	1921	1922	29	3	48		105
Jim Craig	1922	1922	12	3	8		25
Roy Cripps	1921	1922	28	20			60
George Cummins	1921	1921	9	1			3
Bob Cunningham	1923	1923	5				
Martin Cunningham	1922	1928	56	6	1		20
J. Curtis	1925	1925	2				
Gus Cusack	1920	1920	1				
Bill Darragh	1922	1924	35	1			3
Jack Davies	1930	1937	26	6	10		38
Vern Deacon	1926	1928	24	10			30
J. Delamotte	1922	1922	1				
Hilton Delaney	1929	1930	20	7			21
Daniel Dempsey	1927	1927	2	1			3
Jack Dempsey	1934	1934	4				
R. Dempsey	1930	1931	12	4			12
Roy Dinley	1920	1921	30	2			6
M. Dodds	1923	1923	2				
Leo Doran	1930	1932	10	1			3
Griffith Duncan	1934	1934	3	1			3
Jim Dunworth	1921	1924	59	12			36
Robert Dunworth	1922	1925	54	5	1		17
Tom Edwards	1935	1935	14	2			6
Jack Elliott	1932	1936	24	1	22		47
Clive Evatt	1922	1925	46	1			3
Gordon Favelle	1932	1934	31	16	8		64
Jack Fay	1932	1932	11				
William Fennell	1922	1923	6				
Aldo Ferrari	1930	1932	6				
R. Ferry	1922	1922	1				
Vic Fetherstone	1921	1921	8				
Hubert Finn	1920	1926	88	9	8		43
Bill Flanagan	1926	1929	45	12	32		100
Jim Flattery	1920	1925	63	21			63
Frank Freeman	1934	1937	30	6	13		44
Rupert Frew	1931	1933	19	2			6
Geoff Gartner	1934	1934	1				
Henry George	1921	1921	2				
Harold Grant	1925	1926	13		1		2
Jack Gray-Spence	1933	1934	24	15			45
Jim Gregan	1933	1934	28	1			3
Frank Gwynne	1920	1920	12	3	3		15
Les Halberstater	1922	1924	9	2			6
Edmund Hanrahan	1920	1921	20	4			12
Harleigh Hanrahan	1928	1930	35	11	2		37
H. Haynes	1933	1933	1				
George Heery	1927	1929	38	5			15
L. Henry	1922	1922	2		1		2
Jim Hinchey	1932	1932	2				
Fred Homer	1936	1937	28				
J. Hyland	1931	1931	1				
Paul Hyndes	1922	1922	2				
Cecil Inch	1937	1937	9	2			6
Norm Johnson	1932	1932	9	2			6
Matthew Keogh	1922	1922	2				
J. Lambourne	1925	1925	1				
Alby Lane	1922	1928	49	8			24
Frank Learmonth	1934	1937	27				
Tom Linskey	1920	1924	56	1	13		29
Francis Lions	1922	1933	38				
Alf Loton	1936	1936	1				
Jack Lowe	1928	1931	36	11			33
Dick Lynch	1931	1933	32	3			9
J. Lynch	1930	1930	1				
Jock MacNeill	1930	1931	21	10			30
John Madden	1931	1931	5				
Sid Mannix	1930	1932	37	8			24
James Marks	1934	1937	49	2			6
Cyril Massey	1922	1922	1				
G. McCann	1920	1920	2	1			3
Ryan McCarthy	1920	1920	4	1	3		9
G. McCaughey	1926	1927	10	2			6
Eric McClintock	1936	1936	5				
N. McClosky	1920	1921	3	1			3
Paddy McCormack	1925	1929	52	9			27
Bill McCulloch	1934	1935	18	4	5		22
Tom McInerney	1930	1935	53	8	77		178
John McIntyre	1926	1928	40	4	86		184
Charles McKay	1935	1936	11				
Martin McKeown	1922	1923	19	1			3
Alban McKillop	1920	1920	13	4	10		32
Ross McKinnon	1933	1934	18	1	2		7
Alan McLeod	1920	1921	32	6	15		48
Henry McLoskey	1922	1922	1				
Jack McMahon	1925	1925	11	1			3
T. McMahon	1920	1923	20				
James McMenamin	1929	1930	20	3			9
A. McRae	1930	1931	15				
L. McRae	1932	1932	11				
Herbert Milligan	1933	1933	2				
Tom Monaghan	1930	1933	33	11			33
A. Moran	1929	1930	14	1			3
Michael Moran	1935	1937	24	2			6
Ray Morris	1933	1933	5	2			6
Horace Moxon	1923	1924	21	2			6
Crawford Munro	1922	1924	24	7			21
H. Murphy	1922	1922	1				
Wal Murphy	1922	1923	18	7	3		27
Frank Nethery	1935	1937	15	1			3
Trevor Newcombe	1935	1935	11	2			6
A. Norris	1929	1930	4				
Dick O'Brien	1923	1927	41	15	6		57
L. O'Brien	1929	1929	4				
T. O'Donnell	1926	1927	5	1			3
Frank O'Hara	1935	1937	11				
F. O'Loan	1930	1930	5	1	2		7
Rod O'Loan	1933	1934	28	12			36
Frank O'Rourke	1924	1934	46	18	35		124
Ernest Ogg	1925	1933	120	24	18		108
Alex Owen	1926	1929	13	2			6
Phil Parsonage	1930	1937	22	7			21
Rex Pedler	1934	1934	1				
Don Peel	1934	1934	4	1			3
Charlie Peoples	1920	1921	23	3			9
John Perry	1929	1930	4				
Keith Pettiford	1937	1937	3				
A. Powell	1925	1925	4				
Lachlan Powell	1926	1932	30	3			9
John Quinlan	1931	1931	7				
N. Quinlan	1930	1930	5				
Clinton Quinlivan	1928	1928	7	4			12
Norman Quinn	1925	1925	10	2			6
Harry Ratcliffe	1935	1937	21	4			12
Leo Reddy	1935	1936	12	1			3
Jack Redman	1933	1934	10	1			3
Ernest Ritchie	1936	1936	13	1			3
L. Roberts	1921	1921	4				
Charles Rowley	1926	1929	23	1			3
Reg Rowley	1936	1937	6		8		16
Cec Rubie	1929	1932	50	5			15
Jack Rubinson	1936	1937	20				
Edward Ryan	1922	1927	76	25	24		123
Keith Sabine	1925	1928	16	1	1		5
Favel Satterthwaite	1920	1920	12	1			3
Isidor Sender	1923	1927	7				
Leslie Sender	1935	1937	27	2	10		26
John Sharples	1936	1937	9				
Noel Sligar	1921	1922	17	1			3
Jim Smyth	1931	1932	23	4			12
Frank Spillane	1934	1934	9	1			3
Jack Spillane	1933	1934	19	1	17		37
Jim Staines	1936	1937	15	5			15
M. Stevens	1927	1927	1				
C. Sullivan	1936	1936	1				
Greg Sullivan	1931	1935	21				
J. Sullivan	1920	1922	2				
Charles Taylor	1920	1920	9	1			3
W. Temperley	1930	1930	2	1			3
Bob Terry	1922	1925	18	8			24
Jack Thom	1930	1932	28	4			12
Tom Thorne	1937	1937	2				
Dennis Treacy	1935	1935	3	1			3
Leslie Trives	1932	1934	6				
Roy Turner	1935	1937	21	2			6
Maurice Unwin	1922	1925	32	4			12
H. Walpole	1925	1925	2				
C. Ward	1929	1936	17				
Jim Ward	1921	1927	37	7	9		39
Joe Wells	1933	1933	1				
J. Wherrett	1932	1932	3				
Pat Williams	1920	1920	2				
Hugh Willis	1933	1935	23	1	1		5
Keith Willis	1935	1937	16	3			9
Martin Willis	1930	1930	7				
C. Woodhead	1920	1920	2				
John Woods	1926	1926	2				
John Woods	1926	1929	58	19	5		67
J. Woolfe	1927	1930	3				
Ed Wynter	1926	1928	25	1			3

=== Representatives ===
Australian

- Ray Morris (1933/34 Kangaroo Tour)
- Jim Craig

New South Wales

- Hubert "Butt" Finn
- John McIntyre
- A.S. Lane
- Edmund "Feather" Hanrahan
- Harleigh Hanrahan
- Clive Evatt
- Tom Linskey
- Tom Barry
- Frank O'Rourke
- Ray Morris
- Ross McKinnon
- Rod O'Loan
- Ernest Ogg
- Jim Dunworth

== Records ==
=== Club records ===
Biggest Win

- 34 points, 42–8 against St. George at Sydney Sports Ground on 15 July 1933.

Biggest Loss

- 63 points, 0–63 against South Sydney at Sydney Sports Ground on 17 April 1937.

Most Consecutive Wins

- 5 matches, 8 May – 19 June 1926

Most Consecutive Loses

- 42 matches^, 28 April 1934 – 29 August 1936

Record point scorer

- John McIntyre – 176 points

Record appearance holder

- Ernest Ogg – 118 games

^ denotes premiership record

=== Club honours ===
Premierships: (0)

Runners-Up: (1) 1926

Minor Premierships: (0)

Wooden Spoons: (10) 1921, 1923, 1927, 1929, 1930, 1931, 1934, 1935, 1936, 1937
