= Tom Carey (rugby league) =

Australian rugby league footballer

Personal information
- Full name: Thomas Sylvester Carey
- Born: 20 January 1912 Prescot, Lancashire
- Died: 20 June 1992 (aged 80) Sydney, Australia

Playing information
- Position: Halfback, Five-eighth
Club
Years	Team	Pld	T	G	FG	P
1932–34	St George	14	3	3	0	15
1935–36	Canterbury-Bankstown	19	0	12	0	24
1937	University	8	2	3	0	12
	Total	41	5	18	0	51
- Source: As of 20 February 2019

Tom Carey (1912–1992) was an English professional rugby league footballer who played in the 1930s. Carey played for St George Dragons, Canterbury-Bankstown and University. Carey was a foundation player for Canterbury-Bankstown.

== Playing career ==
Carey began his first grade career for St George and played 3 seasons for them before switching to Canterbury in 1935 who were the newly admitted team into the competition. Carey played in the club first ever game against North Sydney at North Sydney Oval which finished in a 20–5 loss. Carey is credited as kicking the first goal for the club.

Canterbury-Bankstown finished the 1935 season in second last position narrowly avoiding the wooden spoon which was handed to University. In 1936, Canterbury managed to do a lot better reaching the preliminary final in their second season as a club.

Carey went on to join University in 1937. The season would be the club's last in the NSWRL competition as they withdrew from the premiership at the conclusion of the season. University finished their final year losing all 9 games. Carey captained and played in the club's final ever game, a 17–0 loss against his former club Canterbury at Belmore Oval.
