= Jack Redman =

Australian rugby league footballer

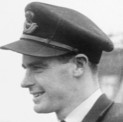

Personal information
- Full name: John Robert Walter Redman
- Born: 10 July 1914 Canterbury, New South Wales, Australia
- Died: 5 July 1945 (aged 30) Borneo, Japanese-occupied Dutch East Indies

Playing information
- Position: Lock
Club
Years	Team	Pld	T	G	FG	P
1933–34	University	10	1	0	0	3
1935–40	Balmain	77	41	0	0	123
	Total	87	42	0	0	126
Representative
Years	Team	Pld	T	G	FG	P
1939	NSW City	1	1	0	0	3
- Military career
- Allegiance: Australia
- Branch: Royal Australian Air Force
- Service years: 1941-1945
- Rank: Squadron leader
- Conflicts: World War II; Pacific War

John Robert Walter Redman (10 July 1914 – 5 July 1945) was an Australian rugby league player who played of the 1930s and an RAAF officer who was killed in the Pacific theatre of World War II.

== Background ==
John Robert Walter Redman was born at Canterbury, New South Wales in 1914, and played rugby league from a young age.

== Playing career ==
He debuted in first grade for University in 1933 and played 10 games for the club between 1933 and 1934. After completing his studies, he joined Balmain in 1935 and went on to become one of the best lock-forwards in Sydney rugby league until his last season in 1940.

Redman was selected for NSW City Firsts, playing in one representative game in 1939.

Balmain Premiers 1939 - Redman 2nd row 3rd from left

== Military career and death ==
He joined the RAAF in 1941 and did not play rugby league again. He rose to squadron leader and was shot down over Borneo on 5 July 1945, five days before his 31st birthday.
