= Reg Williams (rugby league) =

Australian rugby league footballer

Personal information
- Full name: Reg Williams

Playing information
- Position: Wing
Club
Years	Team	Pld	T	G	FG	P
1926–31	South Sydney	23	16	2	0	24

Reg Williams was an Australian rugby league footballer who played in the 1920s and 1930s. He won 3 premierships with the South Sydney Rabbitohs as a winger.

== Playing career ==
Williams was an Eastern Suburbs junior, but made his debut for South Sydney in 1926 against Newtown. That year, Williams was a member of the Souths side which defeated University in the 1926 grand final. Williams missed out on being in the 1927 premiership winning team, but returned the following year and scored a try in the 1928 grand final victory over Easts.

In 1929, Williams won his third premiership with Souths, and scored a hat trick in the 1929 grand final victory over Newtown. Williams played two more seasons for Souths; his final game for the club was a 36–20 victory over Newtown in Round 8 of the 1931 season, where he scored a try.
