= Tom Barry (rugby league, born 1899) =

Australian rugby league footballer (1899-1959)

Personal information
- Full name: Thomas Joseph Barry
- Born: 20 March 1899; Redfern, New South Wales
- Died: 17 July 1959 (aged 60); Randwick, New South Wales

Playing information
- Position: Centre, Wing
Club
Years	Team	Pld	T	G	FG	P
1922–25	South Sydney	30	8	0	0	24
1927	Eastern Suburbs	5	3	0	0	9
	Total	35	11	0	0	33
Representative
Years	Team	Pld	T	G	FG	P
1925	New South Wales	2	0	0	0	0
- Source: As of 10 May 2019

Tom Barry (1899-1959) was an Australian rugby league footballer who played in the 1920s.

Barry played for the South Sydney club in the years 1922-25 and the Eastern Suburbs club in 1927. In the 1923 premiership decider Barry played in the Centre's for Souths.

In 1925 season Barry represented New South Wales in two interstate matches against Queensland.
