= George Treweek =

Australia international rugby league footballer

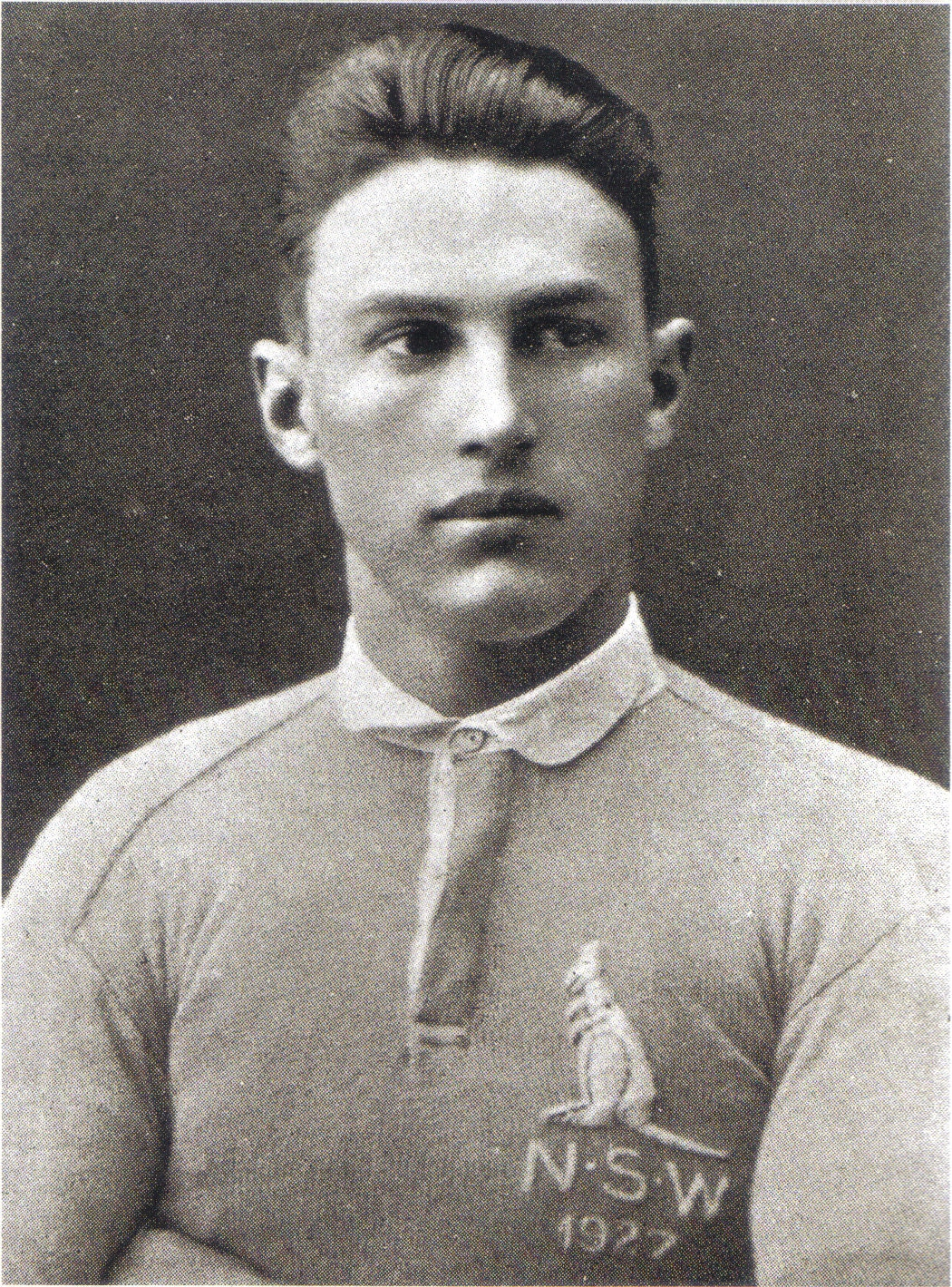
- Treweek in 1927

Personal information
- Full name: Albert George Treweeke
- Born: 31 March 1905 Grahamstown, New South Wales, Australia
- Died: 28 October 1991 (aged 86) Monterey, New South Wales, Australia

Playing information
- Height: 188 cm (6 ft 2 in)
- Weight: 90 kg (14 st 2 lb)
- Position: Second-row
Club
Years	Team	Pld	T	G	FG	P
1926–34	South Sydney	120	39	0	0	117
Representative
Years	Team	Pld	T	G	FG	P
1927–33	New South Wales	26	16	0	0	48
1928–30	Australia	8	2	0	0	6
1928–33	NSW City	6	1	0	0	3

George Treweek (31 March 1905 – 28 October 1991) was an Australian rugby league footballer who played in the 1920s and 1930s. He was a towering second-row in his time, who formed an integral part of the champion South Sydney teams of the 1920s and early 1930s. He is rated as one of the finest second-row forwards ever to play for Australia.

== Club career ==
Starting out as a fullback in the lower grades at the Mascot Juniors RLFC, Treweek was moved into the second-row upon reaching first grade and won five premierships with South Sydney, captaining the side in the 1931 and 1932 premiership victories. All up Treweek played 120 games for Souths between 1926 and 1934.

Kangaroos 1st Test 1929.

== Representative career ==
He made 7 Test appearances for the Australian national representative side. His test debut was against the touring Great Britain team in 1928. He was selected to go on the 1929–30 Kangaroo tour of Great Britain, playing in four tests and 22 games in all and scoring six tries. Curren is listed on the Australian Players Register as kangaroo No. 142. Treweek also played eighteen games for NSW.

== Accolades ==
In 2004 he was named by the Souths in their South Sydney Dream Team, consisting of 17 players and a coach representing the club from 1908 through to 2004. In 2006 he was inducted into the ARL Hall of Fame.

In February 2008, Treweek was named in the list of Australia's 100 Greatest Players (1908–2007) which was commissioned by the NRL and ARL to celebrate the code's centenary year in Australia.

In 2010, Treweek was named as captain in the Mascot Juniors RLFC Team of the Century.

== Surname and spelling ==
George Treweeke was born Albert George Treweek. The family name was always spelled without the final e. His brothers and parents all kept the original spelling but George changed it to Treweeke. He never had the heart to tell the press of the day that they had spelled his name wrong throughout his entire career. The proper spelling of his surname is actually Treweek not Treweeke though he graciously accepted Treweeke throughout his life.

== Sources ==
- Andrews, Malcolm. The ABC of Rugby League. Australia: ABC Books, 2006.
