= 1940 South Sydney season =

South Sydney Rabbitohs season

- NSWRFL rank: 6th (out of 8)
- Play-off result: Did not qualify
- 1940 record: Wins: 7; draws: 0; losses: 7
- Points scored: For: 165; against: 259

Team information
- Coach: Charlie Lynch
- Captain: Fred Felsch

Top scorers
- Tries: Alan Quinlivan (7)
- Goals: Fred Felsch (20)
- Points: Fred Felsch (43)
← 1939	1941 →

The 1940 South Sydney Rabbitohs season was the 33rd in the club's history. The club competed in the New South Wales Rugby Football League Premiership (NSWRFL), finishing the season 6th.

== Ladder ==
	Team	Pld	W	D	L	PF	PA	PD	Pts
1	Eastern Suburbs	14	9	1	4	250	136	+114	19
2	Newtown	14	9	0	5	261	200	+61	18
3	St. George	14	7	2	5	263	203	+60	16
4	Canterbury-Bankstown	14	8	0	6	204	195	+9	16
5	Balmain	14	7	1	6	199	162	+37	15
6	South Sydney	14	7	0	7	165	259	-94	14
7	North Sydney	14	4	0	10	156	243	-87	8
8	Western Suburbs	14	3	0	11	159	259	-100	6

== Fixtures ==
Round	Opponent	Result	Score	Date	Venue	Crowd	Ref
1	Western Suburbs	Loss	11 – 16	Thursday 25 April	Cumberland	5,000	
2	Balmain	Win	9 – 5	Saturday 27 April	Sports Ground	4,000	
3	Eastern Suburbs	Loss	12 – 19	Saturday 4 May	Sports Ground	8,000	
4	St. George	Loss	8 – 30	Saturday 11 May	Sydney Cricket Ground	13,450	
5	Canterbury-Bankstown	Win	18 – 16	Saturday 18 May	Belmore Oval		
6	Newtown	Loss	13 – 24	Saturday 25 May	Sydney Cricket Ground	10,620	
7	North Sydney	Win	17 – 4	Saturday 1 June	Sports Ground	4,000	
8	Western Suburbs	Win	4 – 2	Saturday 22 June	Sports Ground		
9	Balmain	Loss	0 – 27	Saturday 29 June	Leichhardt Oval	4,000	
10	St. George	Win	13 – 6	Saturday 6 July	Hurstville Oval	4,000	
11	Eastern Suburbs	Loss	7 – 38	Saturday 13 July	Sports Ground		
12	Newtown	Loss	8 – 37	Saturday 20 July	Sports Ground		
13	Canterbury-Bankstown	Win	24 – 22	Saturday 27 July	Sports Ground		
14	North Sydney	Win	21 – 13	Saturday 3 August	North Sydney Oval		

== Player statistics ==
Name	App	T	G	FG	Pts
James Armstrong	1	0	0	0	0
Fred Blann	11	1	0	0	3
Johnny Brown	13	2	0	0	6
Ernie Cox	3	2	0	0	6
Percy Fairall	6	2	0	0	6
Sid Feegan	3	2	0	0	6
Fred Felsch	11	1	20	0	43
Bill Goodwin	6	0	0	0	0
James Hale	3	1	0	0	3
Howard Hallett	3	0	0	0	0
Eddie Hinson	5	0	0	0	0
Neville Jack	1	0	0	0	0
Reg Kable	5	0	0	0	0
Jack Kadwell	5	0	0	0	0
George Kilham	14	3	0	0	9
Les McDonald	2	0	2	0	4
Donald McInerney	4	2	1	0	8
Arthur Mather	7	1	0	0	3
Ken Murray	4	4	0	0	12
Johnny Parker	1	0	0	0	0
Alan Quinlivan	12	7	1	0	23
Leon Quinlivan	2	1	0	0	3
Tommy Robertson	7	1	0	0	3
Alan Schaefer	3	0	0	0	0
Ernie Singles	9	0	0	0	0
Billy Stokes	3	1	6	0	15
Jack Walsh	13	0	0	0	0
John Whitfield	4	0	0	0	0
Kevin Willcocks	10	2	0	0	6
Jack Wunsch	11	2	0	0	6
