= 1936 South Sydney season =

- NSWRFL rank: 7th (out of 9)
- Play-off result: Did not qualify
- 1938 record: Wins: 5; draws: 0; losses: 8
- Points scored: For: 187; against: 185

Team information
- Coach: Dave Watson
- Captain: Eric Lewis
- Avg. attendance: 5,000

Top scorers
- Tries: Alan Quinlivan & Harold Thomson (7)
- Goals: Fred Felsch (28)
- Points: Fred Felsch (62)
← 1935	1937 →

The 1936 South Sydney Rabbitohs season was the 29th in the club's history. The club competed in the New South Wales Rugby Football League Premiership (NSWRFL), finishing the season 7th.

== Ladder ==
	Team	Pld	W	D	L	B	PF	PA	PD	Pts
1	Eastern Suburbs	13	11	2	0	2	335	145	+190	28
2	Balmain	13	9	0	4	2	268	161	+107	22
3	Canterbury	14	9	2	3	1	345	243	+102	22
4	North Sydney	13	7	1	5	2	210	161	+49	19
5	Newtown	14	7	0	7	1	203	226	-23	16
6	Western Suburbs	13	5	1	7	2	199	203	-4	15
7	South Sydney	13	5	0	8	2	187	185	+2	14
8	St. George	13	3	0	10	2	141	228	-87	10
9	Sydney University	14	1	0	13	1	99	414	-315	4

== Fixtures ==
Round	Opponent	Result	Score	Date	Venue	Crowd	Ref
1	Eastern Suburbs	Loss	9 – 26	Monday 13 April	Sports Ground	9,500	
2	Newtown	Loss	2 – 21	Saturday 18 April	Henson Park	7,000	
3	St. George	Win	11 – 7	Saturday 25 April	Earl Park	6,000	
4	Canterbury-Bankstown	Win	22 – 5	Saturday 2 May	Belmore Sports Ground	5,000	
5	BYE						
6	North Sydney	Loss	9 – 12	Saturday 20 June	North Sydney Oval	6,000	
7	Western Suburbs	Loss	5 – 12	Saturday 27 June	Pratten Park	3,000	
8	Balmain	Loss	6 – 23	Saturday 4 July	Leichhardt Oval	3,000	
9	Sydney University	Win	49 – 9	Saturday 11 July	Earl Park	1,500	
10	Eastern Suburbs	Loss	8 – 23	Saturday 25 July	Sydney Cricket Ground	7,800	
11	Newtown	Loss	15 – 16	Saturday 1 August	Henson Park	5,300	
12	St. George	Win	20 – 7	Saturday 8 July	Earl Park	5,000	
13	Canterbury-Bankstown	Loss	2 – 12	Saturday 15 August	Belmore Sports Ground	3,000	
14	BYE						
15	North Sydney	Win	27 – 12	Saturday 29 August	Chatswood Oval	3,000	

== Player statistics ==
Name	App	T	G	FG	Pts
John Banham	9	3	0	0	9
Joe Brennan	1	0	0	0	0
Walter Cameron	2	1	0	0	3
Francis Curran	10	2	1	0	8
Arthur Dean	7	0	0	0	0
Henry Eyers	5	1	0	0	3
Fred Felsch	12	2	28	0	62
Eddie Finucane	11	3	2	0	9
Harry Griffin	11	1	5	0	3
Sam Griffiths	13	0	0	0	0
Bill Halloway	5	0	0	0	0
Jack Hewitt	1	0	0	0	0
Eddie Hinson	2	1	0	0	3
George Kilham	13	1	0	0	3
Eric Lewis	11	2	1	0	8
Bernie Martin	3	3	0	0	9
Jack Munn	2	0	3	0	0
Francis O'Connor	1	0	17	0	0
A Potter	2	0	3	0	0
Alan Quinlivan	8	7	0	0	21
Jack Stewart	12	2	2	0	10
Jimmy Stiff	4	1	0	0	3
C Sutton	2	0	0	0	0
Jim Tait	1	0	1	0	2
Harold Thomson	11	7	0	0	21
Alby Thorne	6	2	1	0	8
Keith Wylie	4	0	0	0	0
