= 1938 South Sydney season =

- NSWRFL rank: 2nd (out of 8)
- Play-off result: Lost semifinals
- 1938 record: Wins: 9; draws: 1; losses: 4
- Points scored: For: 254; against: 245

Team information
- Coach: Charlie Lynch
- Captain: Fred Felsch
- Avg. attendance: 6,650

Top scorers
- Tries: Don Manson (14)
- Goals: Percy Williams (40)
- Points: Percy Williams (80)
← 1937	1939 →

The 1938 South Sydney Rabbitohs season was the 31st in the club's history. The club competed in the New South Wales Rugby Football League Premiership (NSWRFL), finishing the season 2nd.

== Ladder ==
	Team	Pld	W	D	L	PF	PA	PD	Pts
1	Canterbury-Bankstown	14	12	2	1	276	135	+141	26
2	South Sydney	14	9	1	4	254	245	+109	19
3	Balmain	14	7	1	6	238	176	+62	15
4	Eastern Suburbs	14	6	3	5	228	203	+25	15
5	North Sydney	14	6	0	8	163	220	-57	12
6	Newtown	14	5	1	8	174	228	-54	11
7	Western Suburbs	14	4	1	9	155	265	-110	9
8	St. George	14	3	1	10	159	275	-116	7

== Fixtures ==
=== Regular season ===
Round	Opponent	Result	Score	Date	Venue	Crowd	Ref
1	Balmain	Loss	5 – 10	Saturday 23 April	Leichhardt	3,000	
2	Eastern Suburbs	Win	21 – 14	Monday 25 April	Sydney Cricket Ground	8,000	
3	North Sydney	Win	31 – 5	Saturday 30 April	Sydney Cricket Ground	5,000	
4	Western Suburbs	Win	8 – 4	Saturday 7 May	Sydney Cricket Ground	5,000	
5	St. George	Win	28 – 14	Saturday 14 May	Earl Park	5,000	
6	Newtown	Win	18 – 4	Saturday 21 May	Sydney Cricket Ground	7,300	
7	Canterbury-Bankstown	Draw	3 – 3	Saturday 28 May	Sydney Cricket Ground	20,100	
8	Balmain	Win	35 – 7	Saturday 18 June	Sydney Cricket Ground	10,300	
9	Western Suburbs	Win	13 – 9	Saturday 25 June	Pratten Park	3,500	
10	North Sydney	Loss	11 – 19	Saturday 16 July	North Sydney Oval	4,000	
11	Eastern Suburbs	Loss	10 – 28	Saturday 23 July	Sports Ground		
12	St. George	Win	33 – 3	Saturday 30 July	Sydney Cricket Ground	3,700	
13	Canterbury-Bankstown	Loss	8 – 12	Saturday 6 August	Sydney Cricket Ground	10,00	
14	Newtown	Win	30 – 13	Saturday 13 August	Henson Park	3,000	

=== Finals ===
Semi-finals
20 August 1938 - Sydney Cricket Ground
Canterbury	31
Balmain	24
27 August 1938 - Sydney Cricket Ground
Eastern Suburbs	19
South Sydney	10

Final
3 September 1938 - Sydney Cricket Ground
Canterbury	19
Eastern Suburbs	6

== Player statistics ==
Name	App	T	G	FG	Pts
George Boyd	2	0	0	0	0
Johnny Brown	15	5	0	0	15
Ray Byrne	11	4	0	0	12
Percy Fairall	15	0	4	0	8
Fred Felsch	13	3	7	0	23
Eddie Hinson	14	4	0	0	12
Dick Johnson	13	1	0	0	3
Jack Kadwell	2	0	0	0	0
George Kilham	15	5	0	0	15
Albert Lee	1	0	0	0	0
Paul McCann	10	3	0	0	9
Rodney McFarlane	2	0	0	0	0
Vincent Mahboub	2	0	0	0	0
Don Manson	14	13	0	0	39
Bernard Murphy	6	2	0	0	6
Alan Quinlivan	10	8	0	0	24
Alan Schafer	2	0	0	0	0
William Schmidt	2	0	0	0	0
William Schofield	1	0	0	0	0
Harold Thomson	13	4	0	0	12
Alan Tuohey	4	1	0	0	3
Tom Voce	1	0	0	0	0
Jack Walsh	14	1	0	0	3
Percy Williams	12	0	40	0	80
David Woods	1	0	0	0	0
Totals	195	54	51	0	264
