= 1934 South Sydney season =

South Sydney Rabbitohs season

- NSWRFL rank: 4th (out of 8)
- Play-off result: Lost Semi Final
- 1934 record: Wins: 8; draws: 0; losses: 6
- Points scored: For: 213; against: 149

Team information
- Coach: Charlie Lynch
- Captain: George Treweek
- Stadium: Sydney Sports Ground

Top scorers
- Tries: Fred Blann (8)
- Goals: Percy Williams (23)
- Points: Percy Williams (61)
← 1933	1935 →

The 1934 South Sydney Rabbitohs season was the 27th in the club's history. The club competed in the New South Wales Rugby Football League Premiership (NSWRFL), finishing the season fourth.

== Ladder ==
	Team	Pld	W	D	L	PF	PA	PD	Pts
1	Eastern Suburbs	14	12	0	2	308	165	+143	24
2	Western Suburbs	14	12	0	2	263	158	+105	24
3	St. George	14	9	0	5	251	166	+85	18
4	South Sydney	14	8	0	6	213	149	+64	16
5	Newtown	14	5	0	9	192	229	-37	10
6	North Sydney	14	5	0	9	194	234	-40	10
7	Balmain	14	4	0	10	206	275	-69	8
8	Sydney University	14	1	0	13	113	364	-251	2

== Fixtures ==
=== Trials ===
Opponent	Result	Score	Date	Venue	Ref
Eastern Suburbs	Win	3 – 0	Saturday 31 March	Sydney Cricket Ground	
North Sydney	Loss	4 – 10	Monday 2 April	Sydney Cricket Ground	
Newtown	Win	13 – 5	Saturday 5 May	Sydney Cricket Ground	
Balmain	Loss	24 – 30	Saturday 12 May	Drummoyne	

=== Regular season ===
Round	Opponent	Result	Score	Date	Venue	Crowd	Ref
1	Eastern Suburbs	Win	3 – 0	Wednesday 25 April	Sports Ground	10,800	
2	Western Suburbs	Loss	13 – 17	Saturday 28 April	Sports Ground	14,000	
3	St. George	Loss	8 – 31	Saturday 5 May	Earl Park	5,000	
4	Sydney University	Win	45 – 3	Saturday 12 May	Leichhardt Oval	2,000	
5	North Sydney	Draw	10 – 10	Saturday 19 May	North Sydney Oval	6,000	
6	Newtown	Win	19 – 9	Saturday 9 June	Marrickville	5,000	
7	Balmain	Win	28 – 8	Saturday 16 June	Drummoyne	2,000	
8	Eastern Suburbs	Loss	10 – 14	Saturday 23 June	Sports Ground	15,400	
9	Western Suburbs	Loss	0 – 6	Saturday 30 June	Sports Ground	8,000	
10	St. George	Loss	7 – 18	Saturday 7 July	Earl Park	3,500	
11	Sydney University	Win	30 – 5	Saturday 14 July	Leichhardt Oval		
12	North Sydney	Draw	11 – 11	Saturday 21 July	Chatswood		
13	Newtown	Win	11 – 5	Saturday 28 July	Marrickville	1,000	
14	Balmain	Win	18 – 12	Saturday 4 August	Drummoyne		

=== Finals ===
Semi-finals
18 August 1934 - Sports Ground
Western Suburbs	16
St. George	6
25 August 1934 - Sports Ground
Eastern Suburbs	19
South Sydney	6

Final
8 September 1934 - Sports Ground
Western Suburbs	15
Eastern Suburbs	12

== Statistics ==
Name	App	T	G	FG	Pts
Fred Blann	9	8	0	0	24
John Coyne	2	1	0	0	3
Francis Curran	11	4	0	0	12
Arthur Dean	10	4	0	0	12
Jim Deeley	2	1	0	0	3
Henry Eyers	9	1	0	0	3
Charlie Fennell	14	0	0	0	0
Harry Finch	14	4	0	0	12
Sidney Harris	13	4	0	0	12
Eddie Hinson	5	2	0	0	6
John Hurst	2	0	0	0	0
John Kollias	3	0	0	0	0
Jack Lennox	6	1	0	0	3
Eric Lewis	13	2	0	0	6
Les McDonald	9	0	8	0	16
Victor Moses	3	0	0	0	0
Francis O'Connor	10	0	0	0	0
A Potter	3	0	0	0	0
E Pratt	1	0	0	0	0
Clinton Quinlivan	3	0	0	0	0
Sid Sampson	3	0	0	0	0
Albert Spillane	6	0	11	0	22
George Treweek	15	1	0	0	3
John Why	11	5	0	0	15
Michael Williams	1	0	0	0	0
Percy Williams	12	5	23	0	61
Keith Wylie	5	2	0	0	6
