= 1935 NSWRFL season =

Rugby league competition

1935 New South Wales Rugby Football League
- Teams: 9
- Premiers: Eastern Suburbs (5th title)
- Minor premiers: Eastern Suburbs (6th title)
- Matches played: 75
- Top points scorer: Dave Brown (244)
- Wooden spoon: University (8th spoon)
- Top try-scorer: Dave Brown (38)

The 1935 New South Wales Rugby Football League premiership was the twenty-eighth season of Sydney’s top-grade rugby league club competition, Australia’s first. The season culminated in Eastern Suburbs’ victory over South Sydney in the final.

== Teams ==
The addition of Canterbury-Bankstown meant that the League involved nine clubs for the first time since 1929.

- Balmain, formed on January 23, 1908, at Balmain Town Hall
- Canterbury-Bankstown, formed October 30, 1934.
- Eastern Suburbs, formed on January 24, 1908, at Paddington Town Hall
- Newtown, formed on January 14, 1908
- North Sydney, formed on February 7, 1908
- South Sydney, formed on January 17, 1908, at Redfern Town Hall
- St. George, formed on November 8, 1920, at Kogarah School of Arts
- University, formed in 1919 at Sydney University
- Western Suburbs, formed on February 4, 1908

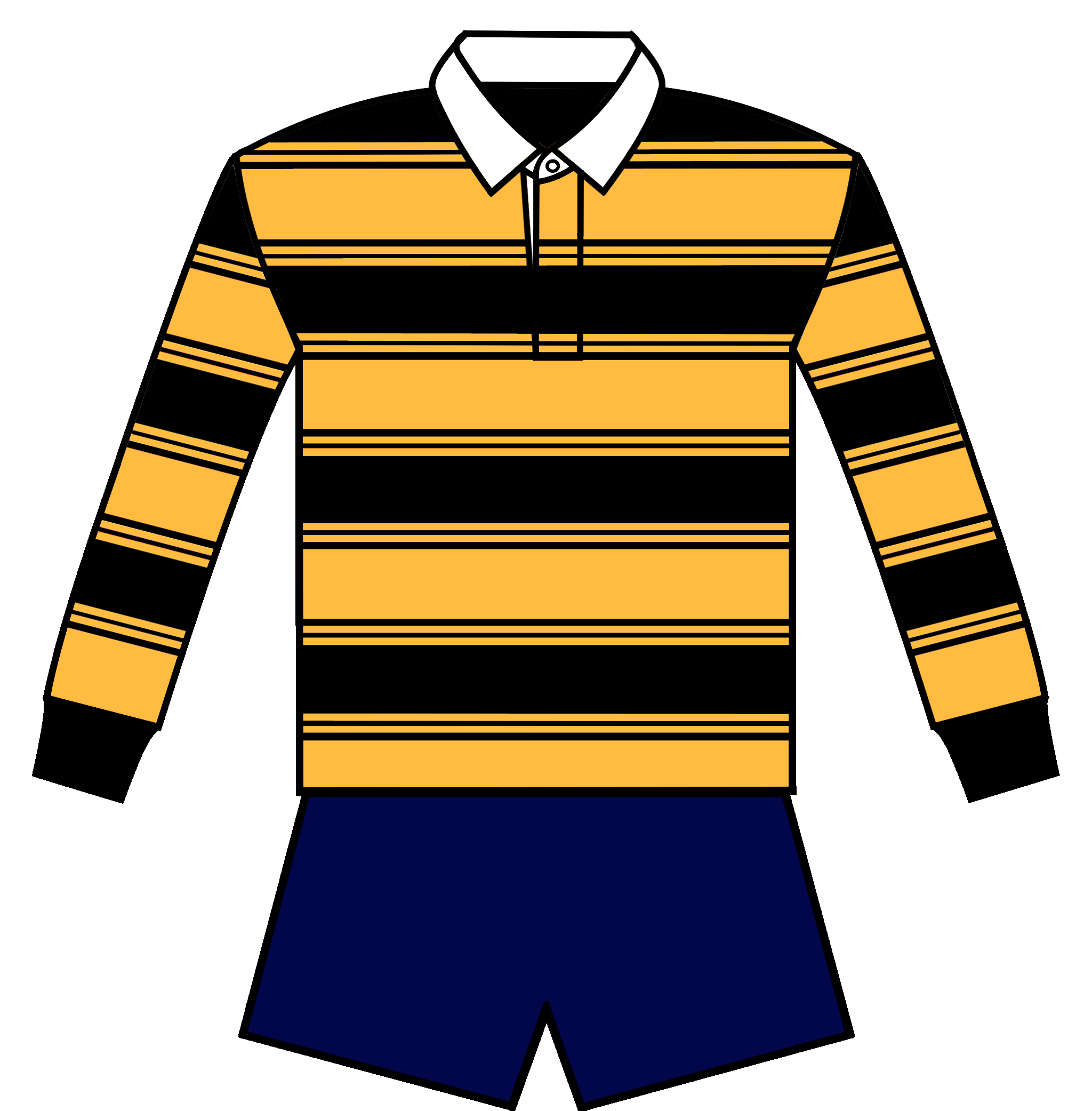
Balmain 28th season Ground: Leichhardt Oval; Coach: George Robinson; Captain: Joe Busch

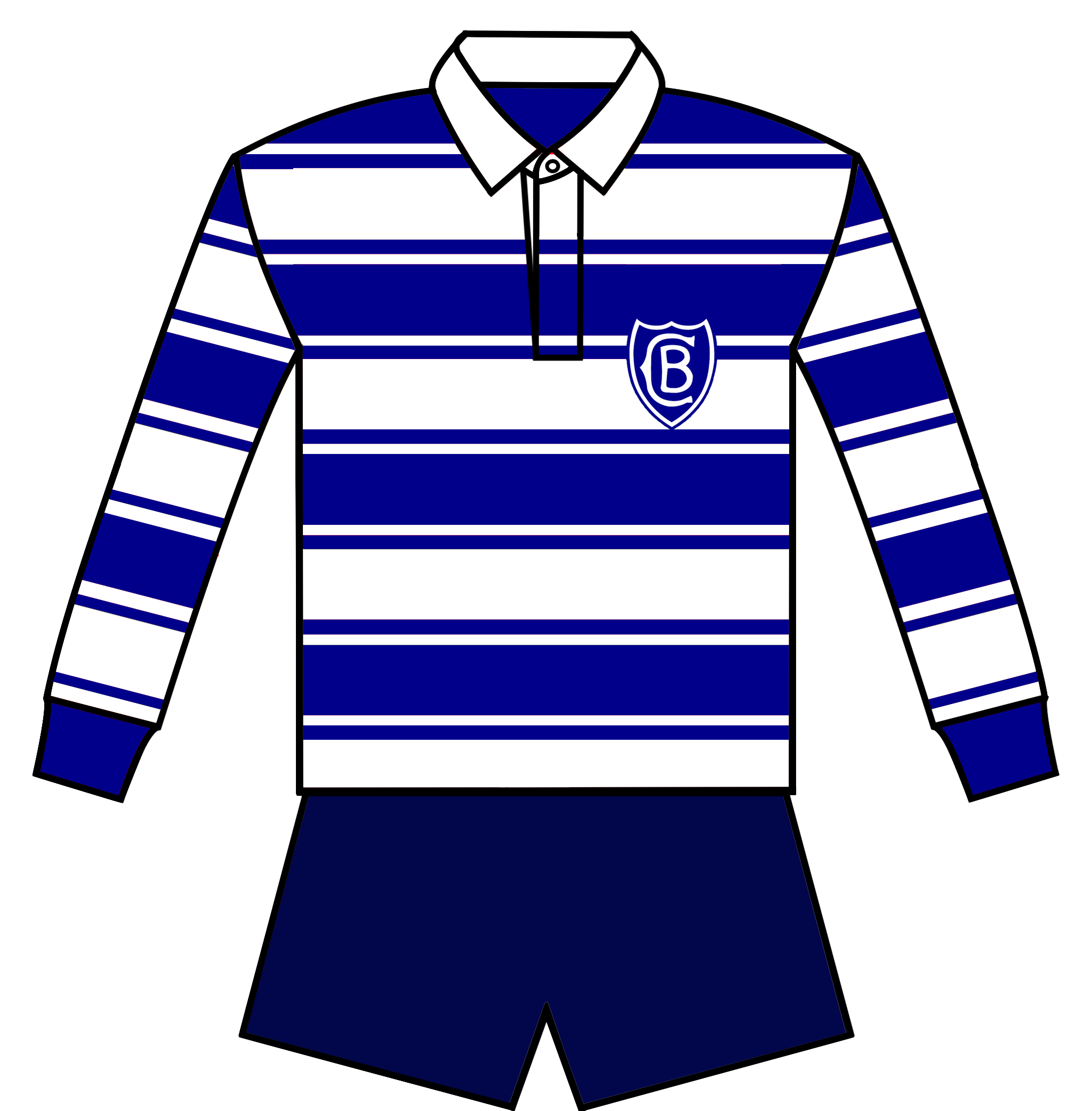
Canterbury-Bankstown 1st season Ground: Pratten Park; Coach: Tedda Courtney; Captain: Jack Morrison & Tom Carey

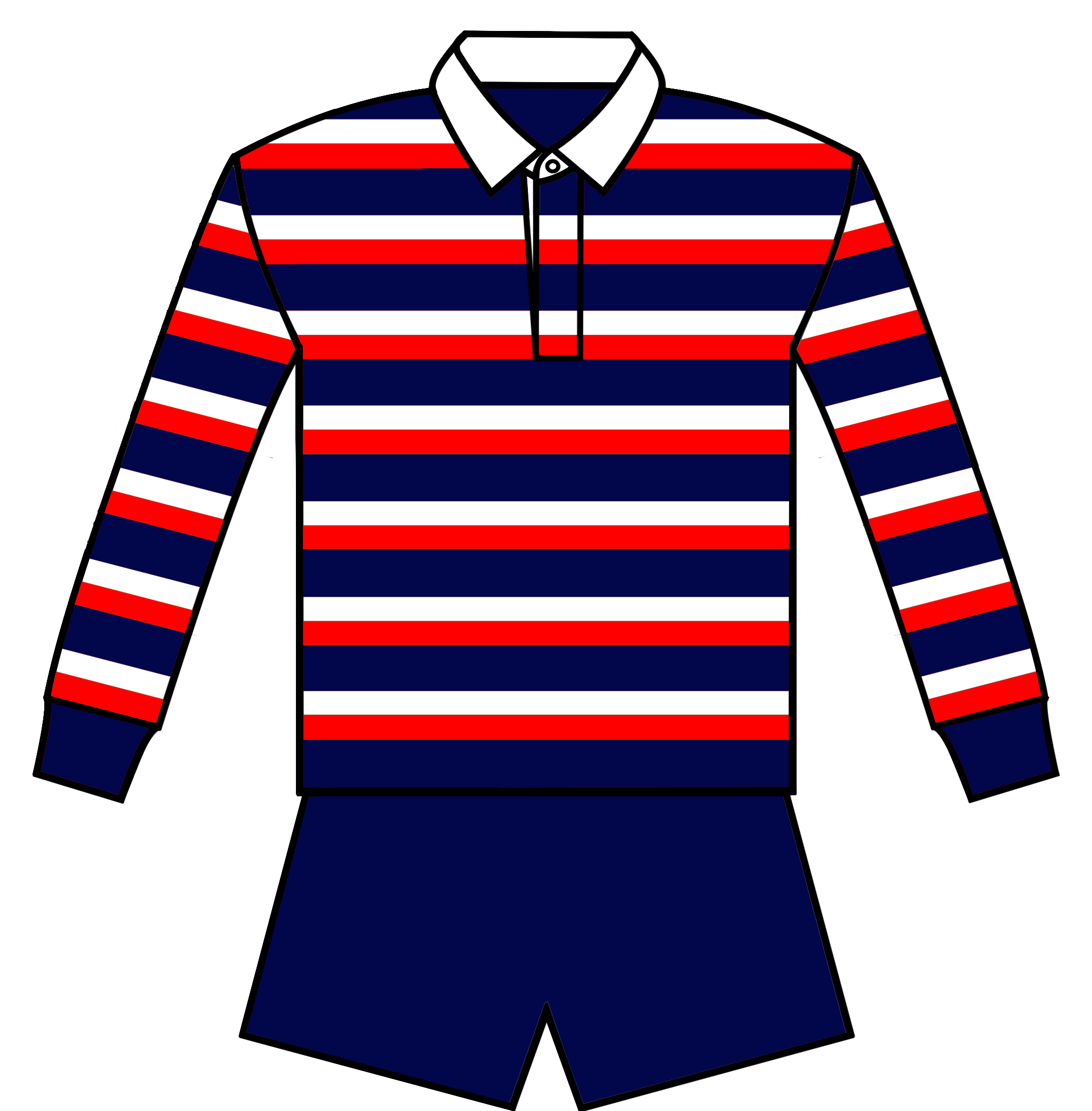
Eastern Suburbs 28th season Ground: Sports Ground; Coach: Arthur Halloway; Captain: Dave Brown

Newtown 28th season Ground: Marrickville Oval; Captain: Hans Mork & Arthur Folwell

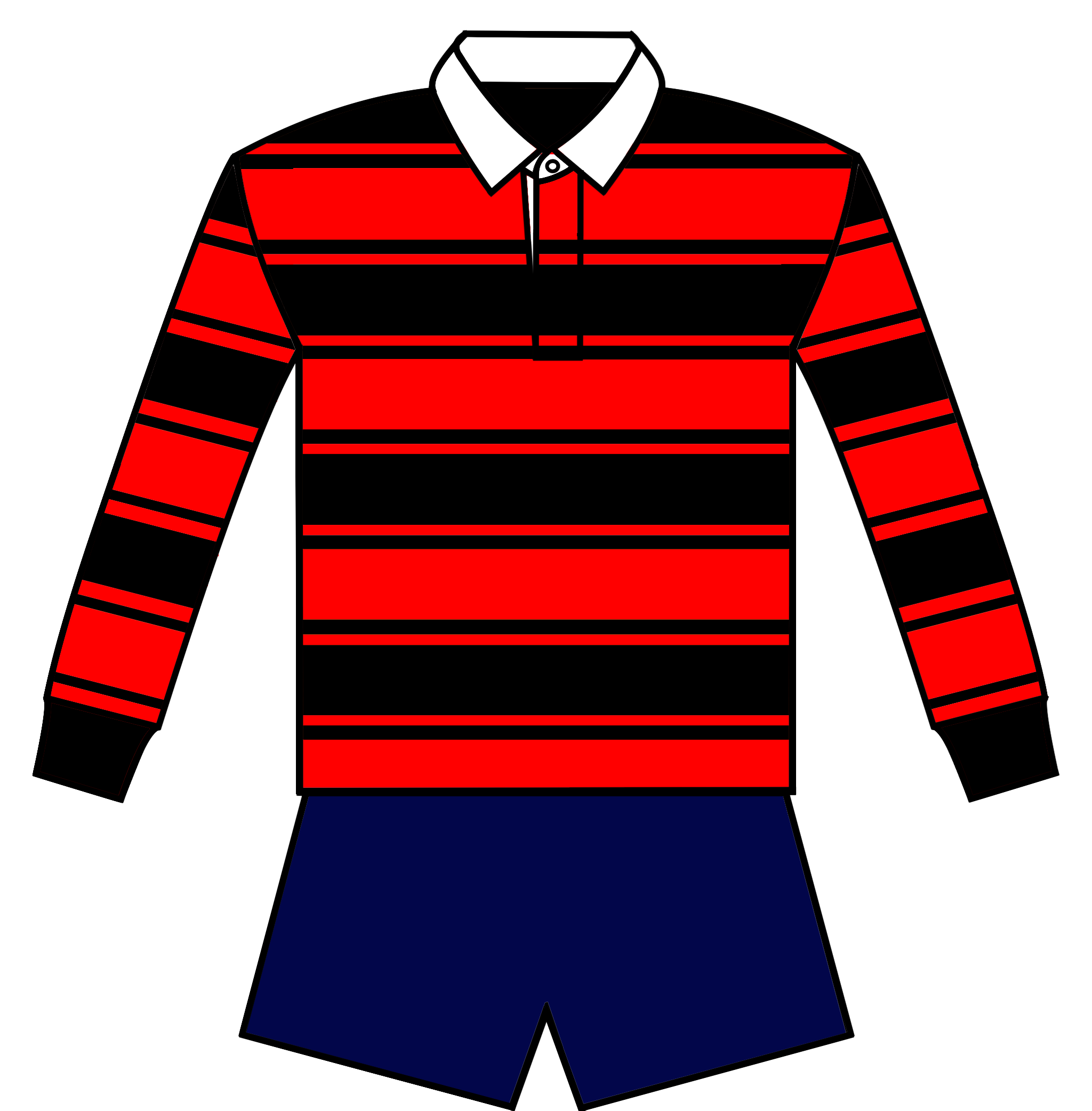
North Sydney 28th season Ground: North Sydney Oval; Coach: Frank Burge; Captain: Stan Ridgway & Grantley Bennett

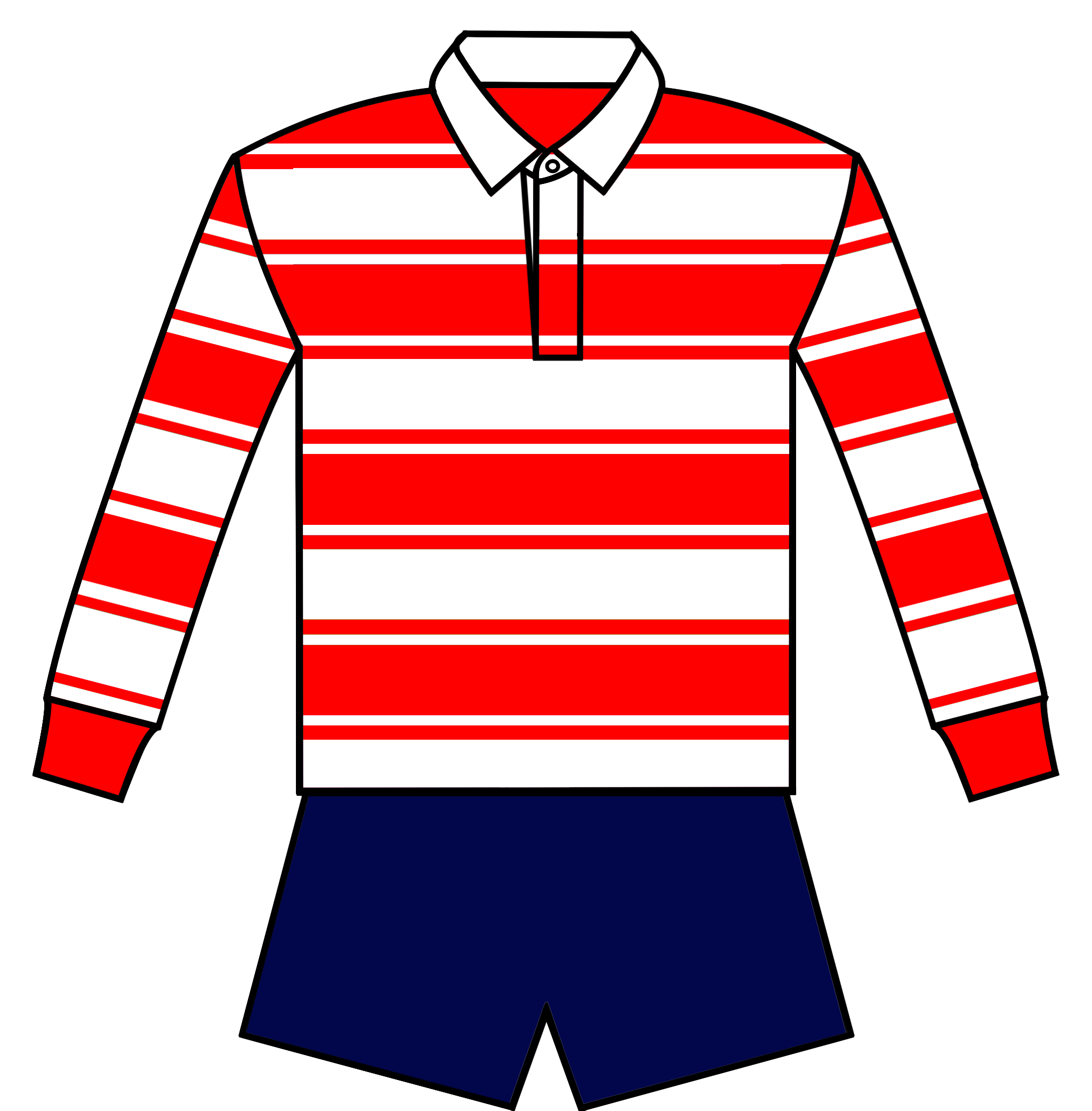
St. George 15th season Ground: Earl Park; Coach: Albert Johnston; Captain: Fred Gardner & Edward Root

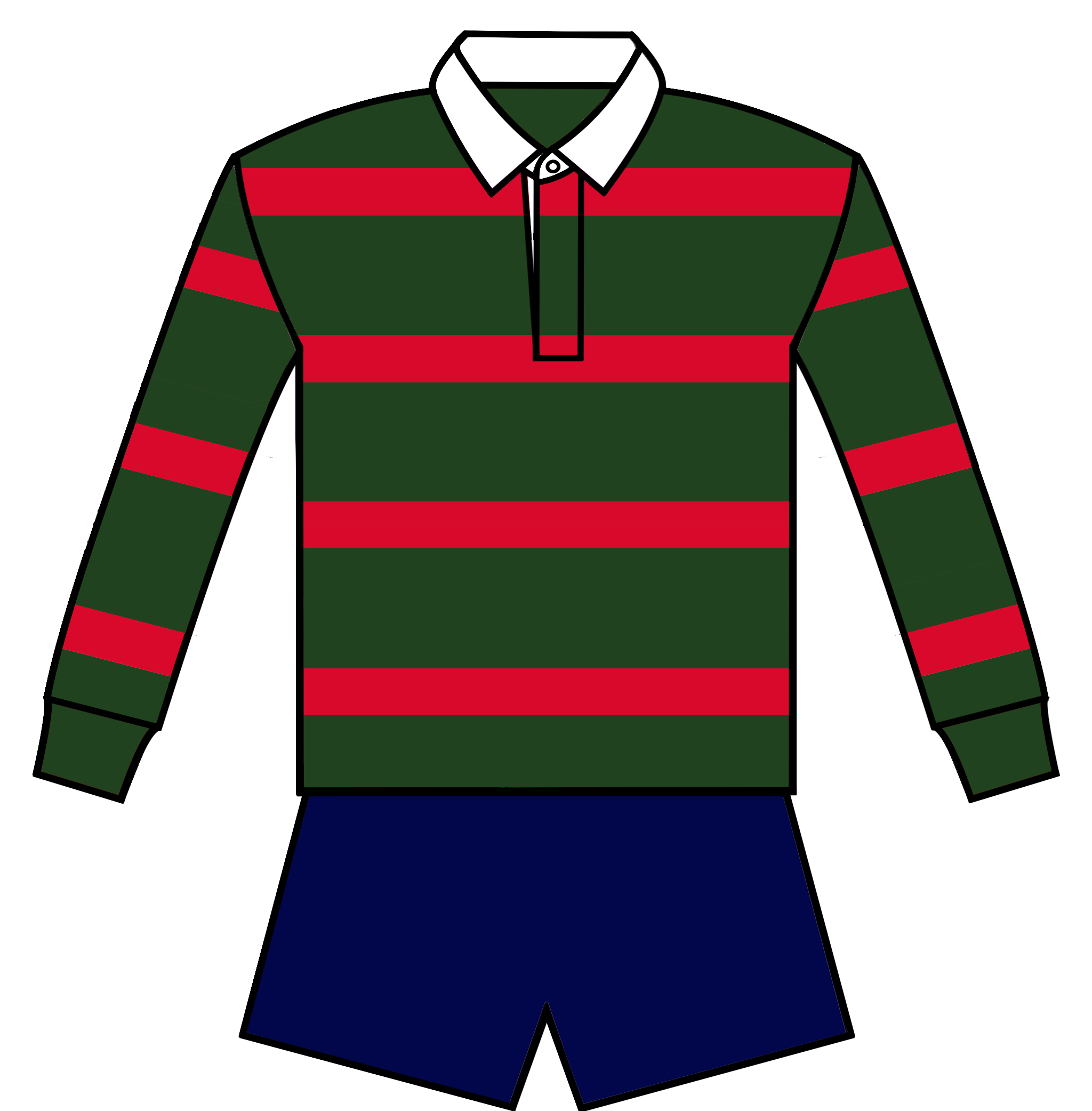
South Sydney 28th season Ground: Sports Ground; Coach: Dave Watson; Captain: Percy Williams

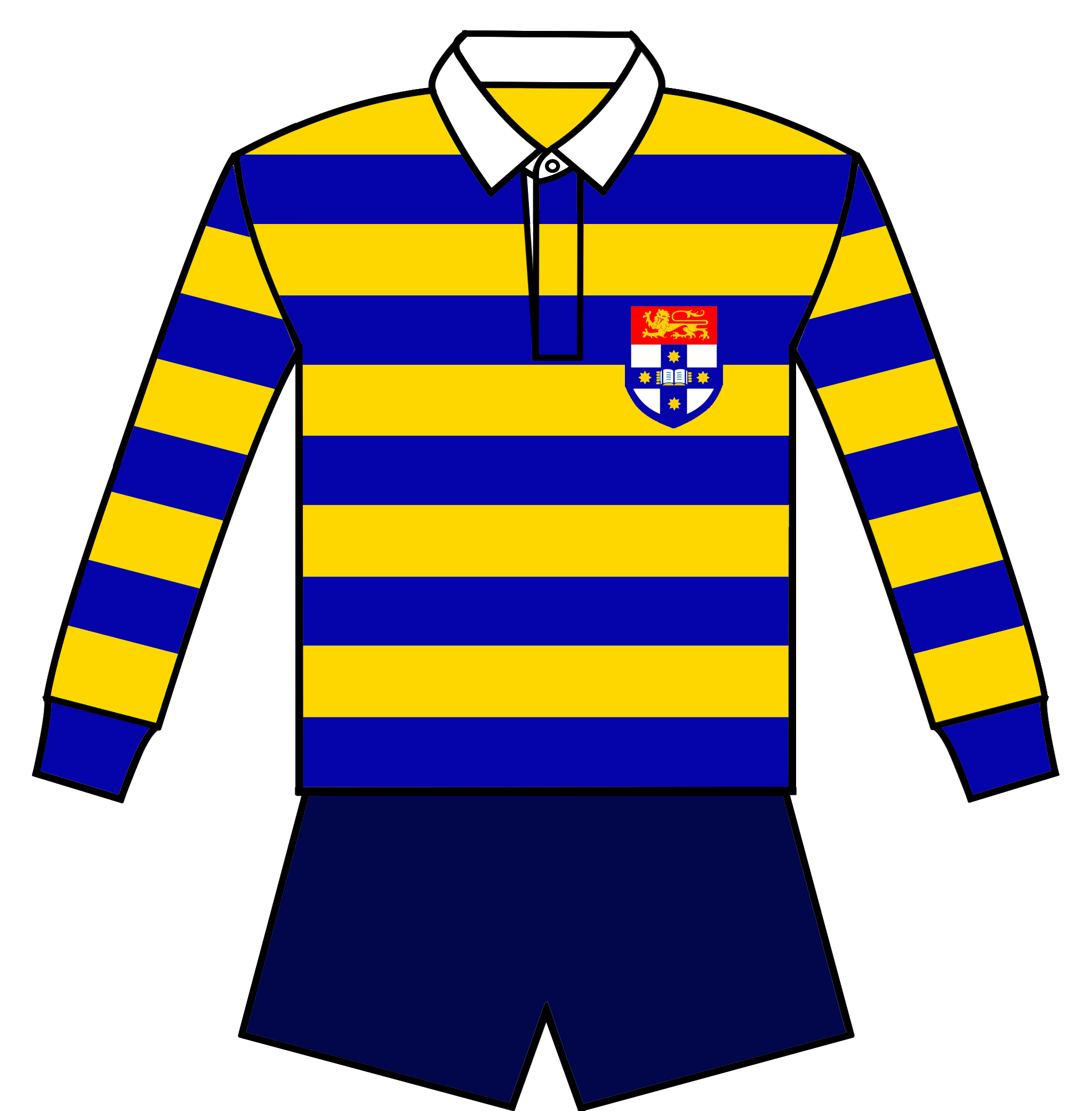
University 16th season Coach: Robert Williams; Captain: Tom McInerney

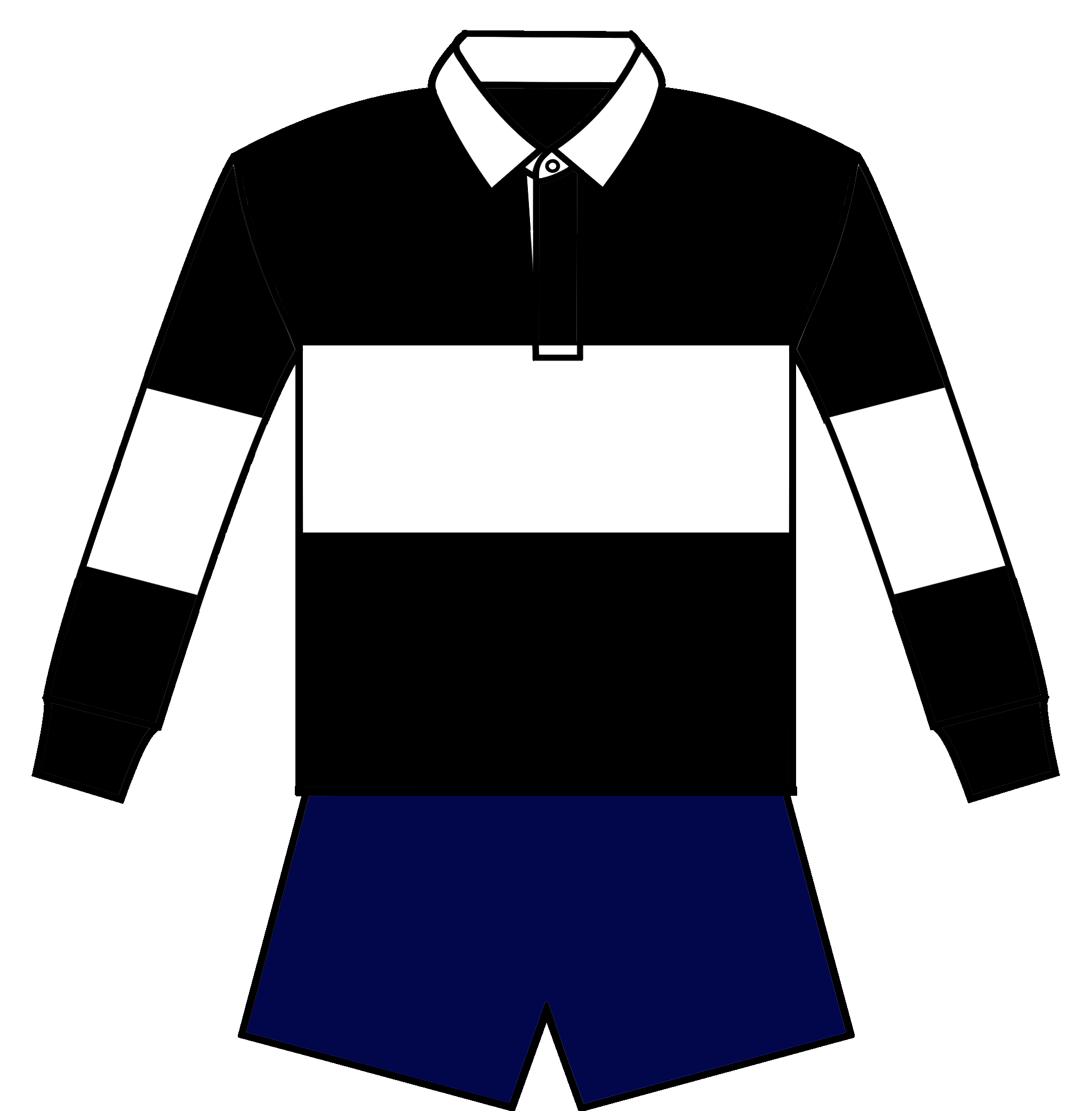
Western Suburbs 28th season Ground: Pratten Park; Captain-coach: Frank McMillan

== Records set in 1935 ==
The University club did not win a single match in 1935, continuing a losing streak that started in round 2, 1934 and which would run till round 14, 1936, and which marks the most consecutive losses in NSWRL/NRL premiership history at 42.

On 11 May at Earl Park, St. George defeated newcomers Canterbury 91–6, this remaining the biggest winning margin and most points scored by one team in the history of the NSWRFL/NSWRL/ARL/NRL, beating South Sydney’s 67–nil win over Western Suburbs in 1910. The following weekend on 18 May, Eastern Suburbs defeated the “Cantabs” (as Canterbury were initially known) 87–7, this remaining the second-highest score and winning margin in the history of the competition. The record in any grade occurred on 19 July 1913 when South Sydney reserves defeated Mosman by 102 points to 2.

In the second half of the Earl Park match, St. George scored fourteen tries and sixty-eight points, this being the most scored in one half of any match.

Eastern Suburbs winger Rod O'Loan scored a club record of seven tries in a 61–5 win over University. This tally stands second (behind Frank Burge's eight tries in 1920) on the list of most individual tries in a premiership match. Dave Brown’s six tries in a 1935 game against Canterbury stands in equal third place in that same list, Easts winning the match 65–10.

The standing record for most tries in one season also comes from 1935, being 38 by Brown.

Dave Brown’s season tally of 244 points stood for 34 years as the record points scored in a season until topped by Eric Simms in 1969.

=== Ladder ===
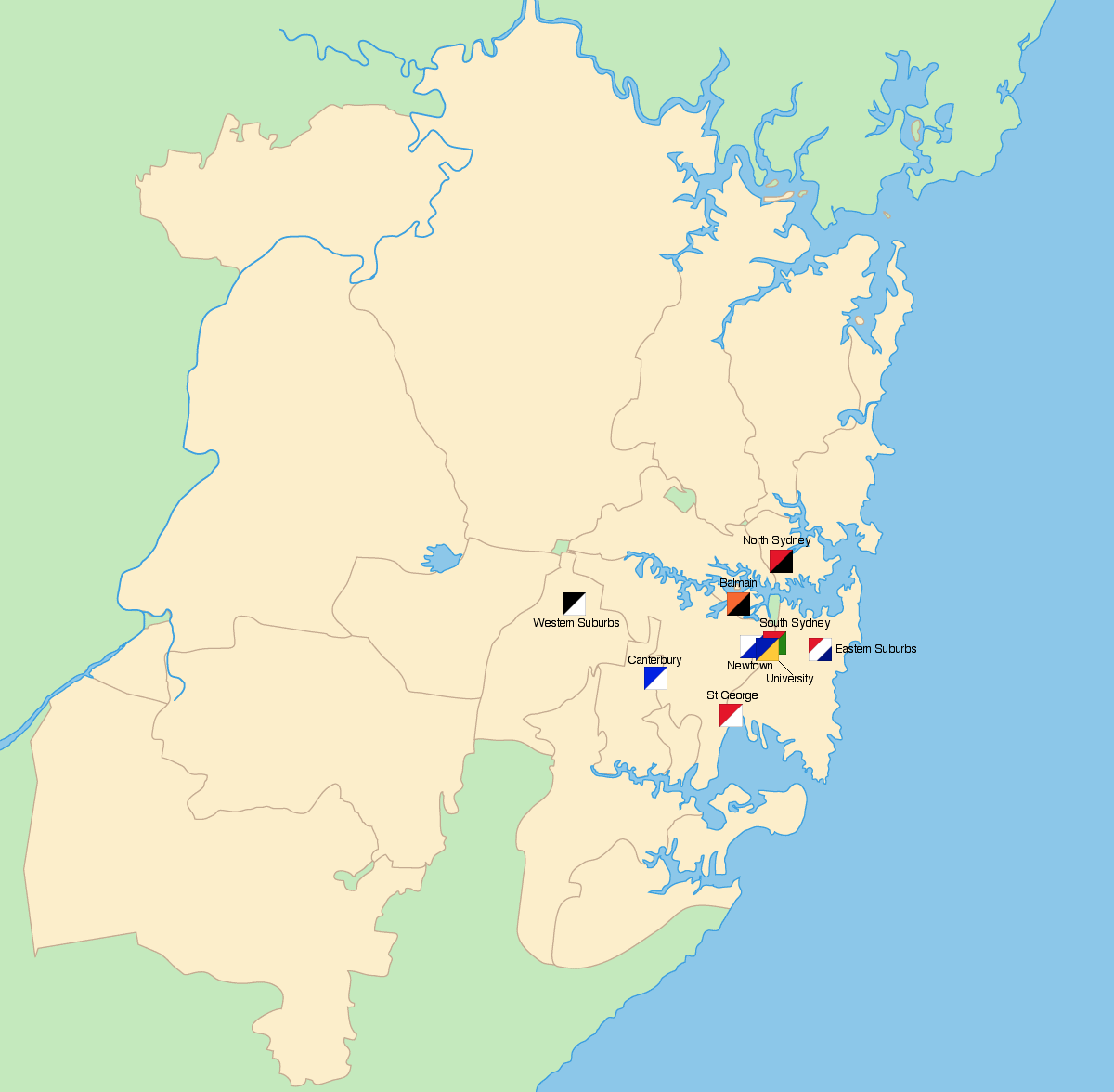
The geographical locations of the teams that contested the 1935 premiership across Sydney.

	Team	Pld	W	D	L	B	PF	PA	PD	Pts
1	Easts	16	15	0	1	2	599	157	+442	34
2	Souths	16	11	0	5	2	314	222	+92	26
3	Wests	16	10	0	6	2	345	243	+102	24
4	Norths	16	9	1	6	2	248	253	-5	23
5	Balmain	16	8	1	7	2	320	225	+95	21
6	St. George	16	8	0	8	2	334	162	+172	20
7	Newtown	16	8	0	8	2	280	248	+32	20
8	Canterbury	16	2	0	14	2	150	660	-510	8
9	University	16	0	0	16	2	109	529	-420	4

== Finals ==
In the two semi-finals played as a double-header at the Sydney Cricket Ground on the same day, the top two ranked teams Eastern Suburbs and South Sydney beat their lower-ranked opponents Western Suburbs and North Sydney. Eastern Suburbs and South Sydney won their respective matches and met each other in the Final.

Semi-finals
7 September 1935 – Sydney Cricket Ground
Eastern Suburbs	15
Western Suburbs	10
7 September 1935 – Sydney Cricket Ground
South Sydney	14
North Sydney	10

Final
14 September 1935 – Sydney Cricket Ground
Eastern Suburbs	19
South Sydney	3

=== Premiership Final ===
Eastern Suburbs	Position	South Sydney
13. Tom Dowling	FB	32. Les McDonald
9. Rod O’Loan	WG	15. Harry Thompson
10. Ross McKinnon	CE	18. Harry Eyers
12. Jack Beaton	CE	34. Eddie Finucane
24. Fred Tottey	WG	54. George Shankland
8. Ernie Norman	FE	12. Jack 'Paddy' Stewart
7. Viv Thicknesse	HB	10. Percy Williams(c)
1. Ray Stehr (c)	PR	6. Jack McCormack
14. Tom McLachlan	HK	7. George Kilham
3. Max Nixon	PR	4. Eric Lewis
4. Harry Pierce	SR	1. Frank Curran
5. Joe Pearce	SR	2. Michael Williams
6. Andy Norval	LK	3. Eddie Hinson
Arthur Halloway	Coach	Dave Watson

Before a crowd of 22,106 and refereed by Tom McMahon, Easts led 9–nil at half-time and were never headed despite being without their record-breaking centre, Dave Brown.

==== Scorers ====
- Eastern Suburbs

Tries: Rod O'Loan 2, Harry Pierce, Fred Tottey, Jack Beaton. Goals: Ross McKinnon 2

- South Sydney

Try: George Shankland

== Player statistics ==
The following statistics are as of the conclusion of Round 18.

Top 5 point scorers

Points	Player	Tries	Goals	Field Goals
244	Dave Brown	38	65	0
154	Syd Christensen	12	59	0
125	Les Griffin	7	52	0
118	Les Mead	4	53	0
116	Percy Williams	4	52	0

Top 5 try scorers

Tries	Player
38	Dave Brown
25	Rod O'Loan
17	Fred Tottey
16	Sid Goodwin
15	Alan Ridley

Top 5 goal scorers

Goals	Player
65	Dave Brown
59	Syd Christensen
53	Les Mead
52	Percy Williams
52	Les Griffin
