= 1945 NSWRFL season =

Rugby league competition

1945 New South Wales Rugby Football League
- Teams: 8
- Premiers: Eastern Suburbs (9th title)
- Minor premiers: Eastern Suburbs (11th title)
- Matches played: 60
- Points scored: 1941
- Top points scorer: Dick Dunn (150)
- Wooden spoon: South Sydney (1st spoon)
- Top try-scorer: Chicka Cahill (13)

The 1945 NSWRFL season was the thirty-eighth New South Wales Rugby Football League premiership season, Sydney’s top-level rugby league club competition, and Australia’s first. Eight teams from across the city contested during the season which culminated in Eastern Suburbs' victory over Balmain in the grand final.

== Teams ==
- Balmain, formed on January 23, 1908, at Balmain Town Hall
- Canterbury-Bankstown
- Eastern Suburbs, formed on January 24, 1908, at Paddington Town Hall
- Newtown, formed on January 14, 1908
- North Sydney, formed on February 7, 1908
- South Sydney, formed on January 17, 1908, at Redfern Town Hall
- St. George, formed on November 8, 1920, at Kogarah School of Arts
- Western Suburbs, formed on February 4, 1908

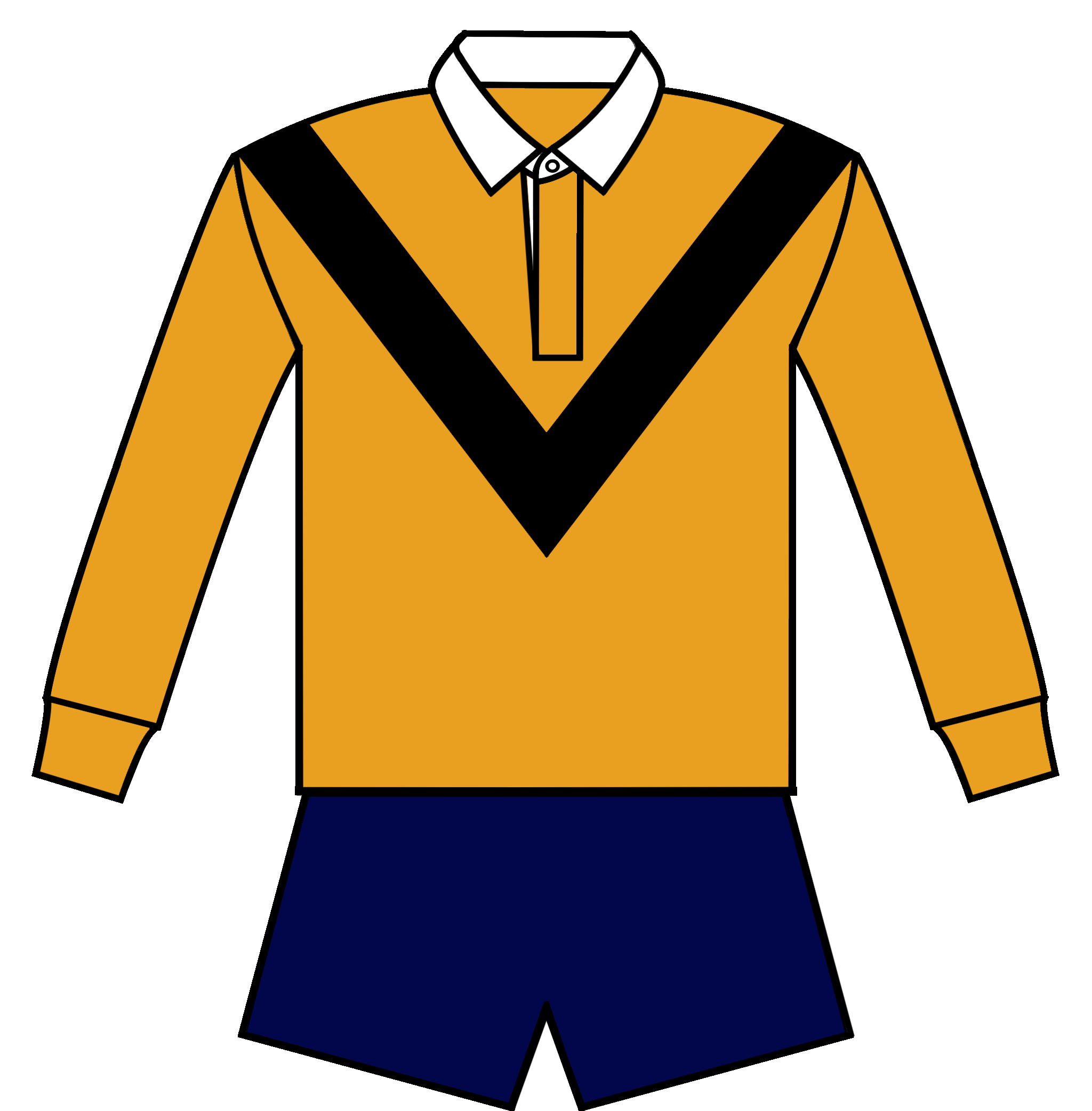
Balmain 38th season Ground: Leichhardt Oval; Captain: Tom Bourke; Coach: Norm Robinson

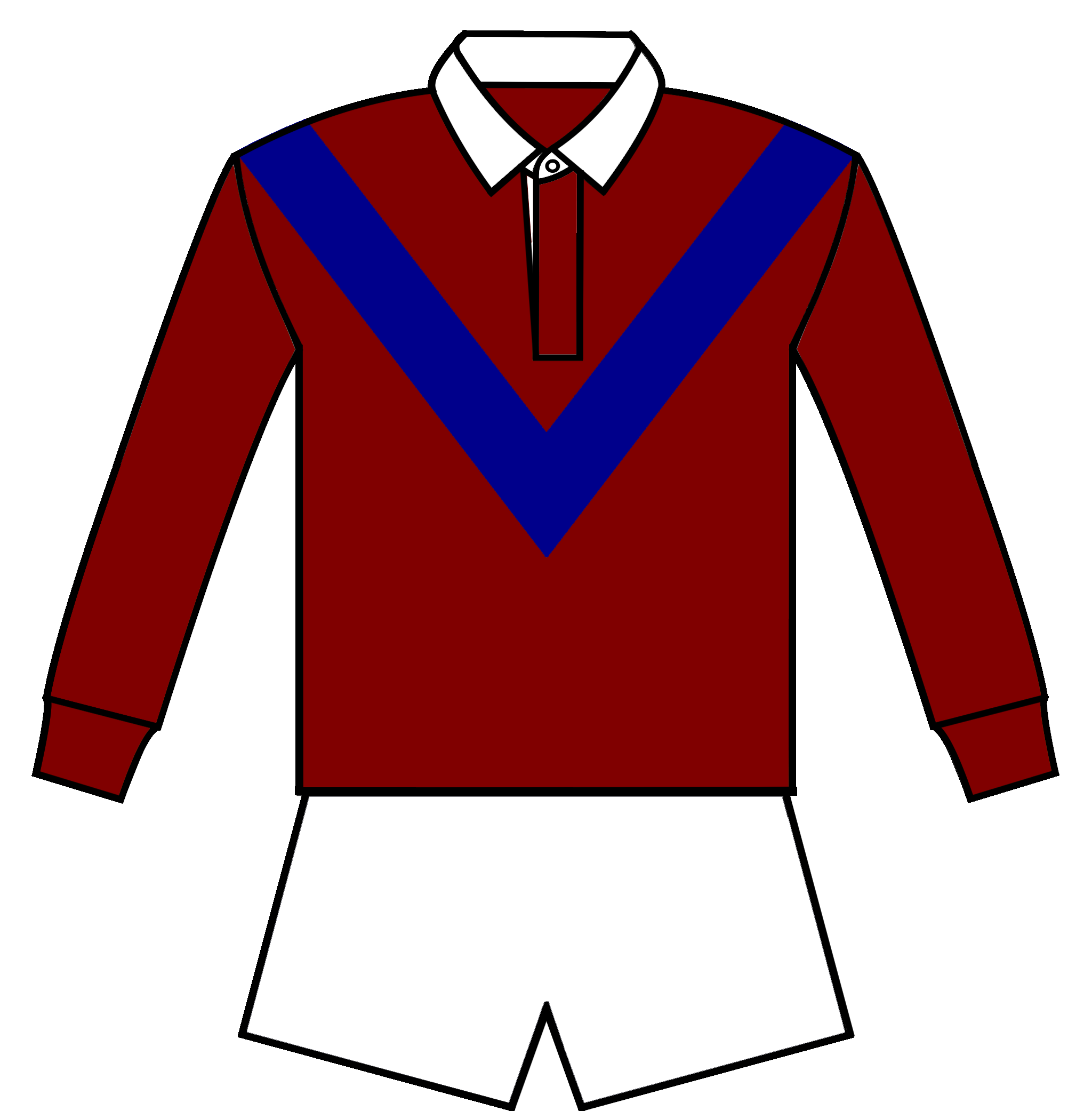
Canterbury-Bankstown 11th season Ground: Belmore Sports Ground; Coach: Bill Kelly; Captain: George Kilham

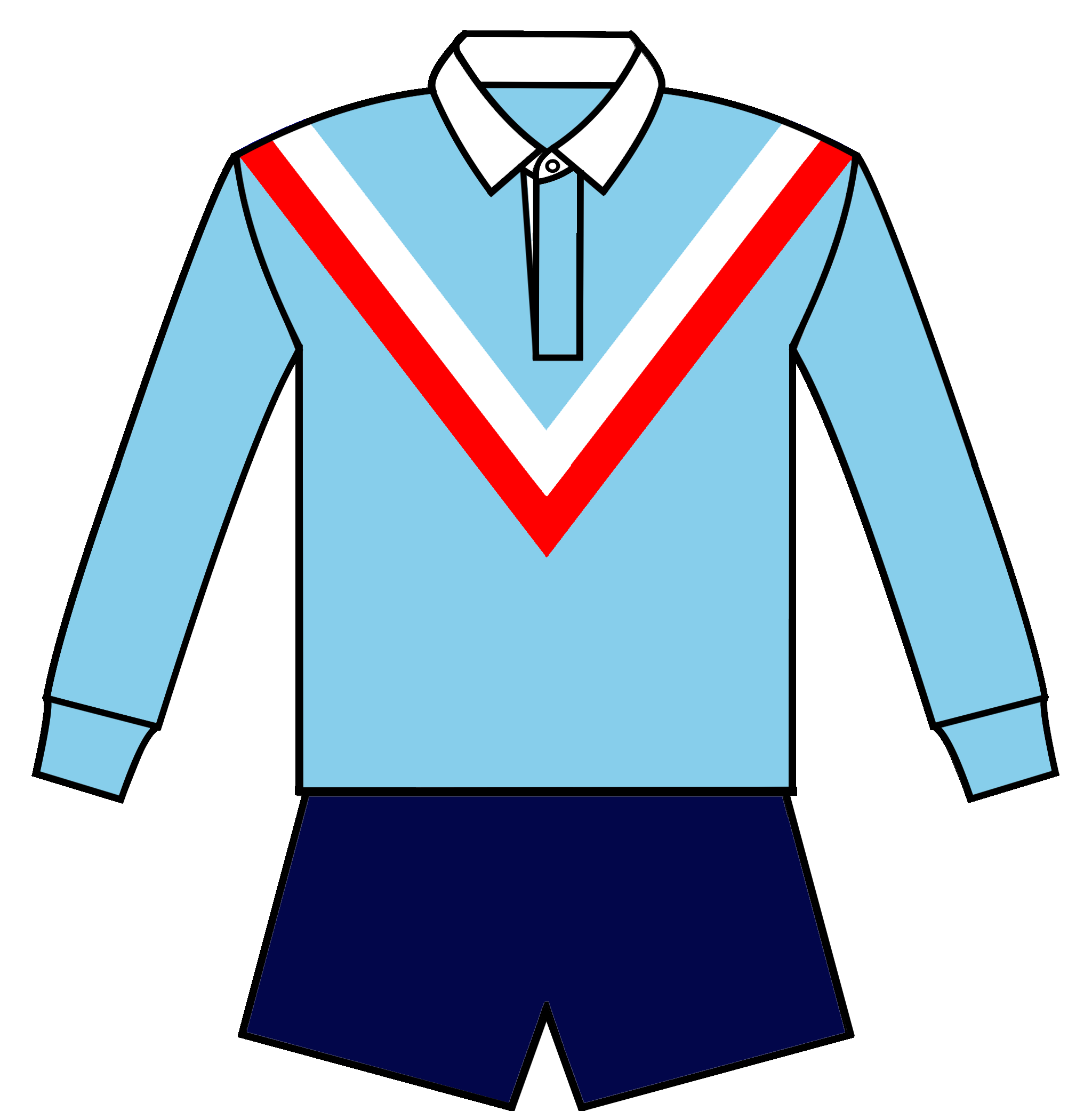
Eastern Suburbs 38th season Ground: Sydney Sports Ground; Coach: Arthur Halloway; Captain: Ray Stehr

Newtown 38th season Ground: Henson Park; Coach: Arthur Folwell, Frank Farrell and Len Smith; Captain: Frank Farrell

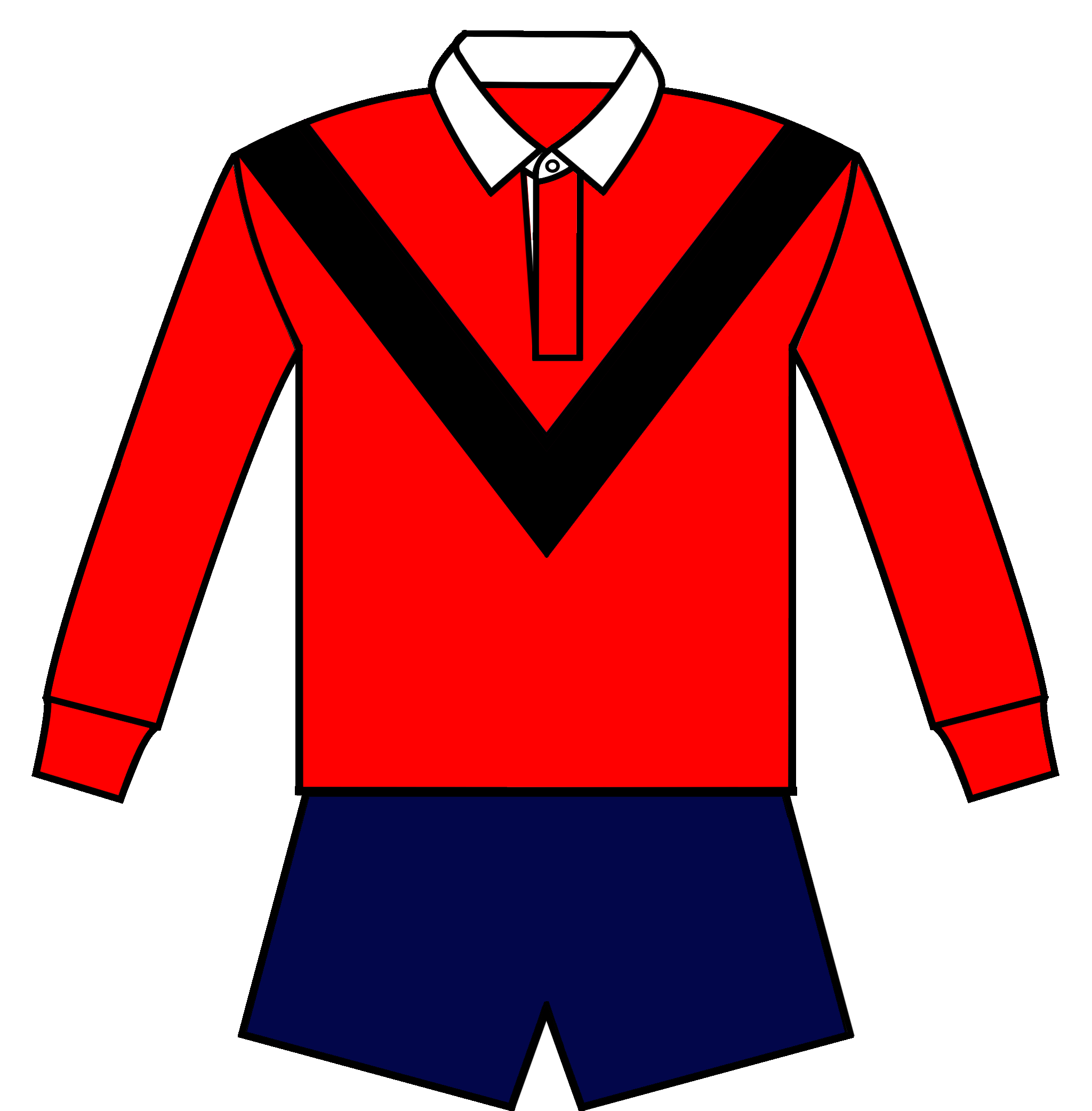
North Sydney 38th season Ground: North Sydney Oval; Coach: Frank Burge; Captain: Rex Harrison

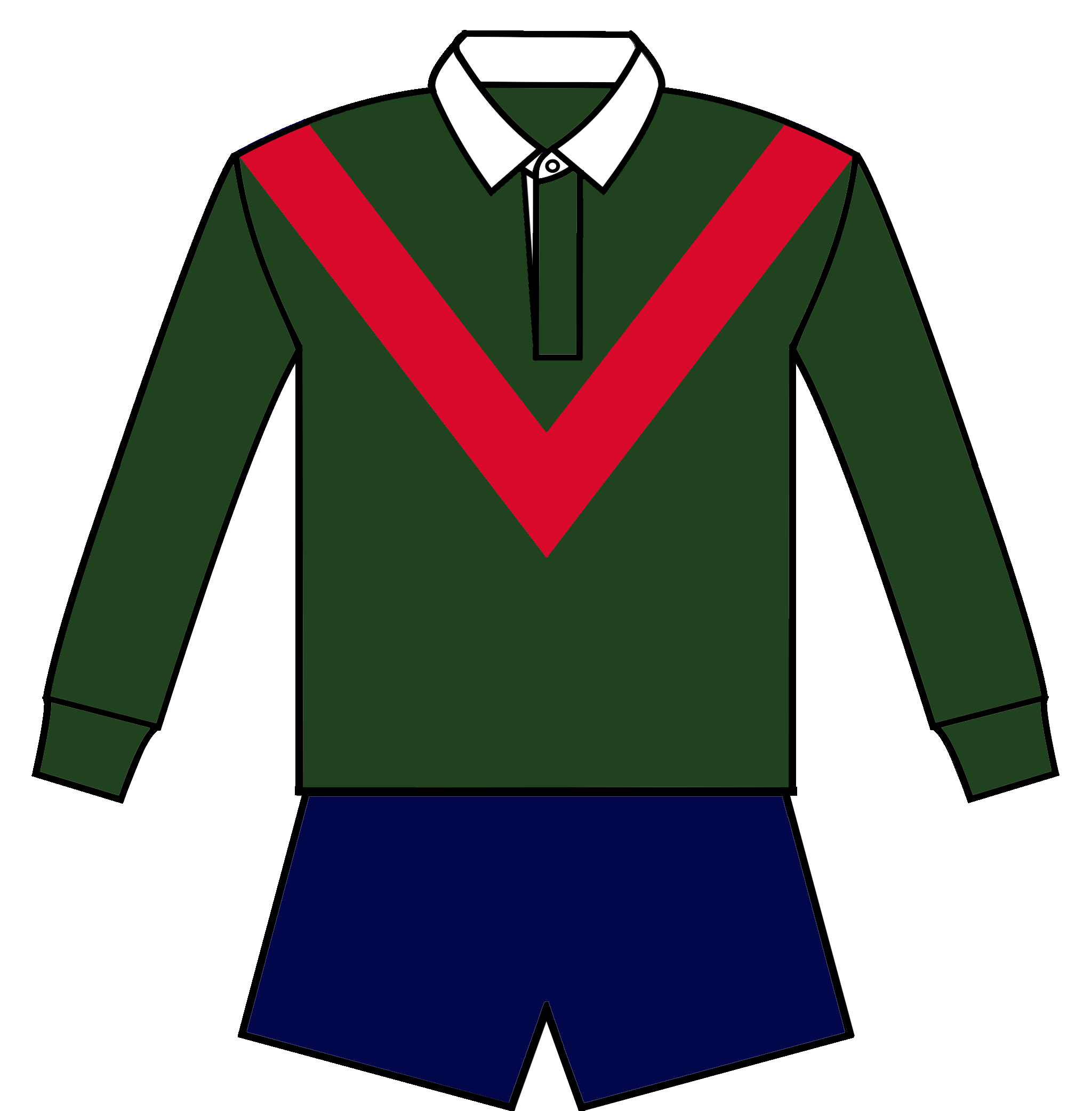
South Sydney 38th season Ground: Sydney Sports Ground; Coach: Eric Lewis; Captain: Eddie Hinson

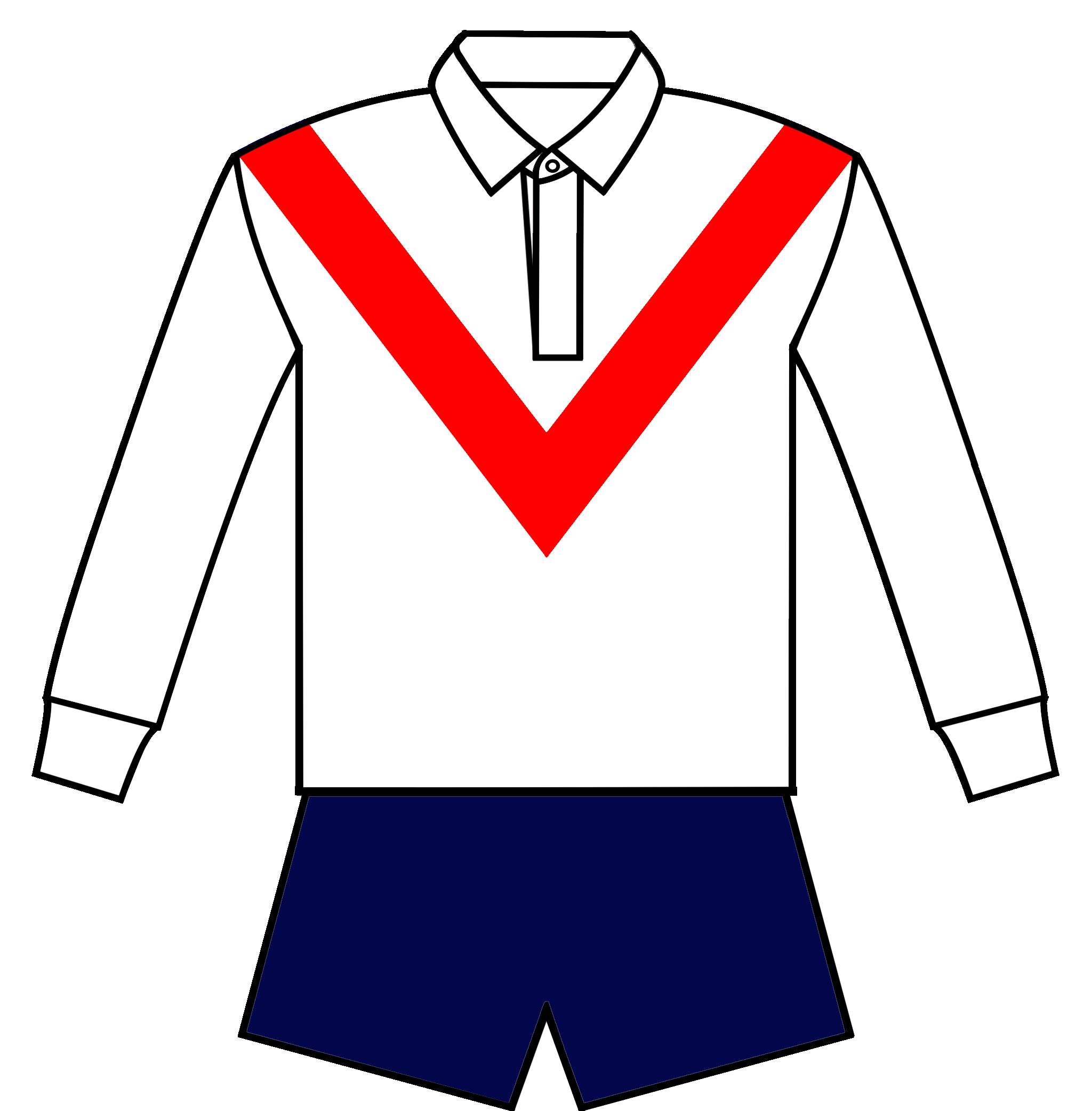
St. George 25th season Ground: Hurstville Oval; Coach: Percy Williams & Harry Kadwell; Captain: Jim Hale

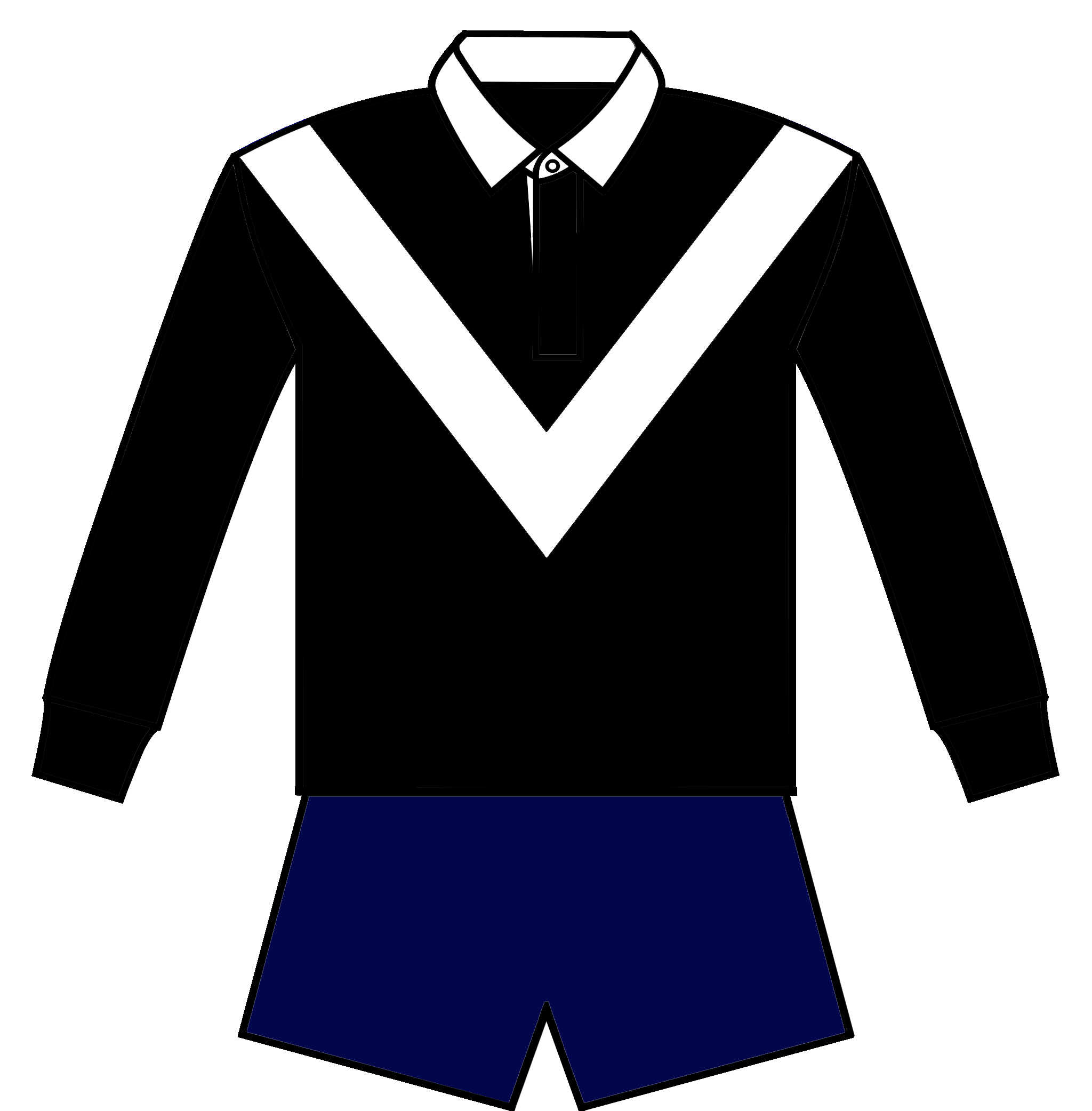
Western Suburbs 38th season Ground: Pratten Park; Coach: Frank McMillan; Captain: Jack Walsh

== Ladder ==
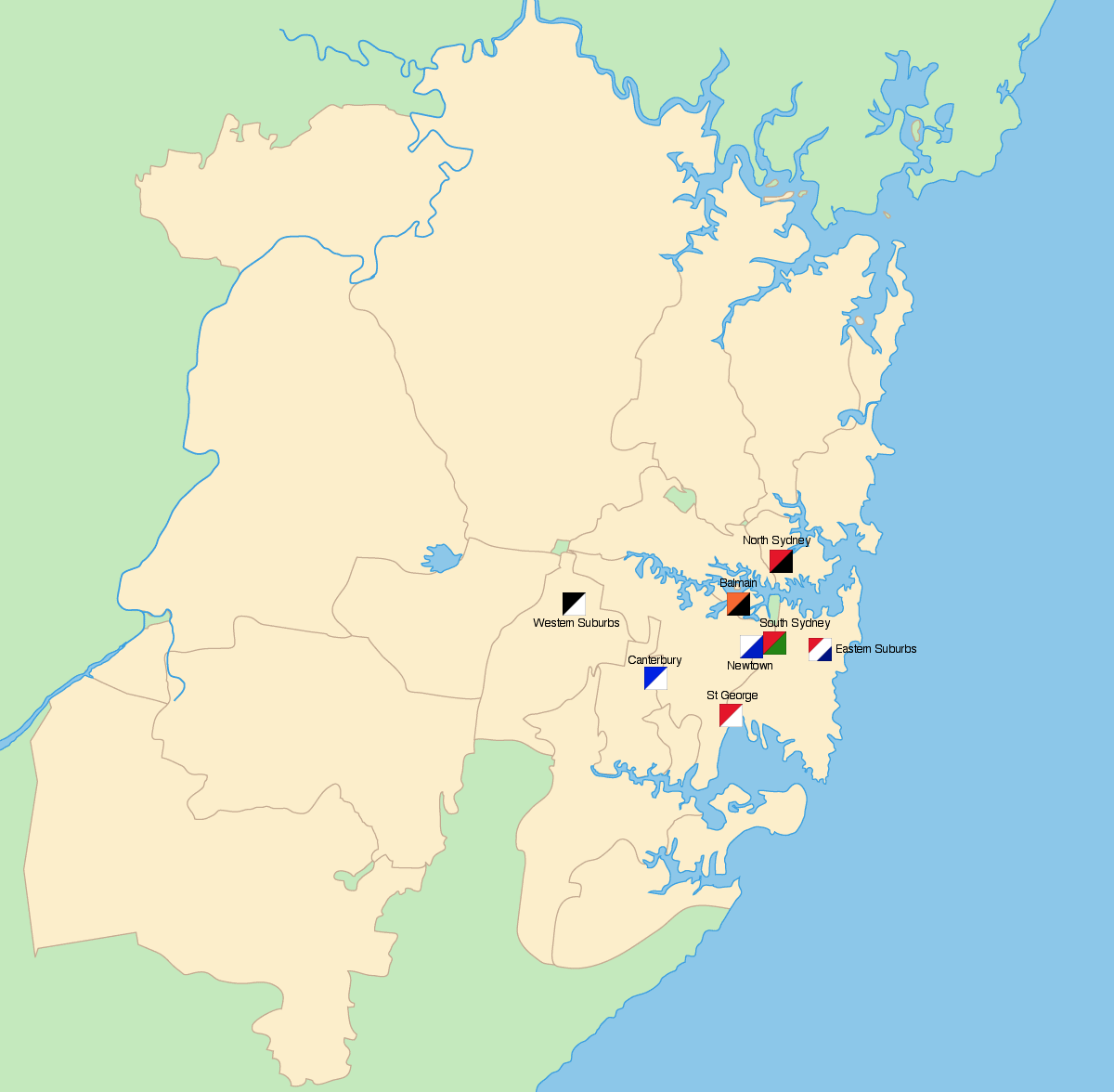
The geographical locations of the teams that contested the 1945 premiership across Sydney.

	Team	Pld	W	D	L	PF	PA	PD	Pts
1	Eastern Suburbs	14	11	0	3	276	190	+86	22
2	Newtown	14	10	1	3	326	177	+149	21
3	Western Suburbs	14	8	1	5	238	192	+46	17
4	Balmain	14	6	4	4	252	202	+50	16
5	North Sydney	14	8	0	6	188	175	+13	16
6	Canterbury	14	4	1	9	217	285	-68	9
7	St. George	14	4	1	9	183	253	-70	9
8	South Sydney	14	1	0	13	144	350	-206	2

== Finals ==
Home	Score	Away	Match Information
Home	Score	Away	Date and Time	Venue	Referee	Crowd
Playoff
Balmain	9–5	North Sydney	16 August 1945	Sydney Cricket Ground		17,207
Semifinals
Eastern Suburbs	28–13	Western Suburbs	18 August 1945	Sydney Cricket Ground	Tom McMahon	34,916
Newtown	9–13	Balmain	25 August 1945	Sydney Cricket Ground	George Bishop	35,151
Final
Eastern Suburbs	22–18	Balmain	1 September 1945	Sydney Cricket Ground	Jack O'Brien	44,585

=== Premiership final ===
Eastern Suburbs	Position	Balmain
40. Ray Pratt	FB	1. Dave Parkinson
9. Lionel Cooper	WG	12. Robert Nielson
10. Paul Tierney	CE	3.Joe Jorgenson
11. Johnny Hunter	CE	4. Tom Bourke (c)
35. Ken Foster	WG	31. Robert Paterson
8. Wally O'Connell	FE	8. Harry Leo
7. Sel Lisle	HB	7. Stan Ponchard
1. Ray Stehr (c)	PR	10. Jack Spencer
15. George Watt	HK	9. Ted Dawes
14. Jack Arnold	PR	23. Hilton Kidd
5. Bert Rollason	SR	11. Jim Metcalf
4. Sid Hobson	SR	24. Sid Ryan
6. Dick Dunn	LK	13. Jack Hampstead
Arthur Halloway	Coach	Norm Robinson

Balmain led 10–5 at half time and the match was evenly balanced throughout the second half. With three minutes to go the Tricolours trailed 17—18. The Roosters were awarded a penalty on half way and Dick Dunn convinced his reluctant captain Ray Stehr that he could make the distance. Dunn successfully kicked the goal from the then unorthodox upright position.

Dunn received Joe Jorgenson’s kick from the restart and booted the ball into touch five metres from the Balmain line. Tricolours’ hooker George Watt won the scrum against the feed and Easts’ classy halves pairing of Sel Lisle and Wally O'Connell put on a move that saw Dunn score in the corner.

Dunn scored 19 of the Tricolours’ 22 points that day carrying with him for luck the sock of his fourteen-month-old daughter in his shorts pocket throughout the match.

Eastern Suburbs 22 (Tries: Dunn 3, J Arnold. Goals: Dunn 5)

defeated

Balmain 18 (Tries: Ponchard 2, Dawes, Nielsen. Goals: Jorgenson 3)

== Player statistics ==
The following statistics are as of the conclusion of Round 14.

Top 5 point scorers

Points	Player	Tries	Goals	Field Goals
118	Dick Dunn	8	47	0
103	Joe Jorgenson	5	44	0
98	Tom Kirk	0	49	0
50	Doug Deitz	0	25	0
41	George Endycott	1	19	0

Top 5 try scorers

Tries	Player
12	Charles Cahill
12	Athol Stewart
11	Sid Goodwin
11	Jack Snare
9	Harry Leo

Top 5 goal scorers

Goals	Player
49	Tom Kirk
47	Dick Dunn
44	Joe Jorgenson
25	Doug Deitz
19	George Endycott
