= 1937 South Sydney season =

- NSWRFL rank: 2nd (out of 9)
- Play-off result: N/A
- 1937 record: Wins: 5; draws: 1; losses: 2
- Points scored: For: 187; against: 56

Team information
- Coach: Charlie Lynch
- Captain: Eric Lewis

Top scorers
- Tries: Harold Thomson (11)
- Goals: Percy Williams (28)
- Points: Fred Felsch (65)
← 1936	1938 →

The 1937 South Sydney season was the 30th in the club's history. The club competed in the New South Wales Rugby Football League Premiership (NSWRFL), finishing the season 2nd.

The 1937 season only lasted 8 rounds due to the Kangaroos tour. No finals were played, and Eastern Suburbs were declared premiers. The second half of the season was occupied by a City Cup tournament.

== Ladder ==
	Team	Pld	W	D	L	B	PF	PA	PD	Pts
1	Eastern Suburbs	8	6	2	0	1	187	56	+131	16
2	South Sydney	8	5	1	2	1	264	58	+106	13
3	St. George	8	5	1	2	1	151	92	+59	13
4	Newtown	8	4	0	4	1	144	126	+18	10
5	Canterbury-Bankstown	8	4	0	4	1	98	91	+7	10
6	Balmain	8	4	0	4	1	115	136	-21	10
7	North Sydney	8	3	0	5	1	84	94	-10	8
8	Western Suburbs	8	3	0	5	1	104	126	-22	8
9	Sydney University	8	0	0	8	1	44	309	-265	2

== Fixtures ==
=== Regular season ===
Round	Opponent	Result	Score	Date	Venue	Crowd	Ref
1	Sydney University	Win	63 – 0	Saturday 17 April	Sports Ground	4,700	
2	Canterbury-Bankstown	Win	14 – 10	Saturday 24 April	Sydney Cricket Ground		
3	St. George	Loss	7 – 8	Monday 26 April	Earl Park, Arncliffe	6,000	
4	Newtown	Win	34 – 14	Saturday 1 May	Henson Park	7,000	
5	Western Suburbs	Win	14 – 9	Saturday 8 May	Sports Ground	8,500	
6	BYE						
7	Eastern Suburbs	Draw	6 – 6	Saturday 15 May	Sydney Cricket Ground	21,200	
8	North Sydney	Loss	8 – 10	Saturday 22 May	North Sydney Oval	7,000	
9	Balmain	Win	15 – 15	Saturday 19 June	Leichhardt		

=== City Cup ===
Round	Opponent	Result	Score	Date	Venue	Crowd	Ref
1	Sydney University	Win	15 – 2	Saturday 26 June	Sports Ground		
2	Canterbury-Bankstown	Loss	7 – 12	Saturday 3 July	Belmore Park		
3	St. George	Win	31 – 10	Monday 10 July	Sydney Sports Ground		
4	Newtown	Loss	22 – 23	Saturday 17 July	Sydney Sports Ground	5,000	
5	Western Suburbs	Loss	10 – 22	Saturday 24 July	Pratten Park		
6	BYE						
7	Eastern Suburbs	Loss	5 – 13	Saturday 7 August	Sydney Cricket Ground		
8	North Sydney	Win	32 – 3	Saturday 14 August	Sydney Cricket Ground		
9	Balmain	Loss	0 – 5	Saturday 21 August	Sydney Cricket Ground		

== Club records ==
Most Tries in a Match: 5 tries by Don Manson versus Sydney University on April 17, 1937
