= 1939 South Sydney season =

South Sydney Rabbitohs season

- NSWRFL rank: 4th (out of 8)
- Play-off result: Runners up
- 1939 record: Wins: 9; draws: 0; losses: 5
- Points scored: For: 219; against: 158

Team information
- Coach: Charlie Lynch
- Captain: Fred Felsch
- Stadium: Sydney Sports Ground

Top scorers
- Tries: Alan Tuohey (12)
- Goals: Fred Felsch (34)
- Points: Fred Felsch (77)
← 1938	1940 →

The 1939 South Sydney Rabbitohs season was the 32nd in the club's history. The club competed in the New South Wales Rugby Football League Premiership (NSWRFL), finishing the season fourth.

== Ladder ==
	Team	Pld	W	D	L	PF	PA	PD	Pts
1	Balmain	14	10	2	2	249	115	+134	22
2	St. George	14	10	0	4	268	169	+99	20
3	Canterbury-Bankstown	14	10	0	4	234	155	+79	20
4	South Sydney	14	9	0	5	219	158	+61	18
5	Eastern Suburbs	14	8	0	6	192	184	+8	16
6	Western Suburbs	14	2	2	10	148	213	-65	6
7	North Sydney	14	2	2	10	129	272	-143	6
8	Newtown	14	2	0	12	124	297	-173	4

== Fixtures ==
=== Regular season ===
Round	Opponent	Result	Score	Date	Venue	Crowd	Ref
1	St. George	Loss	15 – 33	Saturday 22 April	Earl Park		
2	Western Suburbs	Win	8 – 6	Tuesday 25 April	Sports Ground	3,000	
3	Newtown	Win	24 – 2	Saturday 29 April	Henson Oval	6,000	
4	Eastern Suburbs	Win	12 – 0	Saturday 6 May	Sydney Cricket Ground	8,000	
5	Canterbury-Bankstown	Loss	4 – 9	Saturday 13 May	Sports Ground	6,000	
6	Balmain	Win	13 – 11	Saturday 20 May	Sydney Cricket Ground	18,700	
7	North Sydney	Win	26 – 12	Saturday 27 May	North Sydney Oval	5,500	
8	St. George	Loss	8 – 21	Saturday 17 June	Sports Ground	8,000	
9	Western Suburbs	Loss	8 – 19	Saturday 24 June	Pratten Park		
10	Newtown	Win	13 – 8	Saturday 1 July	Earl Park		
11	Eastern Suburbs	Win	13 – 6	Saturday 8 July	Sports Ground	7,000	
12	Canterbury-Bankstown	Win	17 – 12	Saturday 15 July	Sydney Cricket Ground	10,600	
13	Balmain	Loss	5 – 19	Saturday 5 August	Sydney Cricket Ground	11,200	
14	North Sydney	Win	53 – 0	Saturday 12 August	Sports Ground		

=== Finals ===
Home	Score	Away	Match Information
Home	Score	Away	Date and Time	Venue	Referee	Crowd
Semifinals
St. George	10–23	South Sydney	26 August 1939	Sydney Cricket Ground	Tom McMahon	21,722
Final
Balmain	33–4	South Sydney	2 September 1939	Sydney Cricket Ground	George Bishop	26,972
