= 1941 South Sydney season =

South Sydney Rabbitohs season

- NSWRFL rank: 7th (out of 8)
- Play-off result: Did not qualify
- 1941 record: Wins: 4; draws: 0; losses: 10
- Points scored: For: 193; against: 277

Team information
- Coach: Charlie Lynch
- Captain: Fred Felsch
- Avg. attendance: 4,600

Top scorers
- Tries: George Kilham (5)
- Goals: Fred Felsch (24)
- Points: Fred Felsch (43)
← 1940	1942 →

The 1941 South Sydney Rabbitohs season was the 34th in the club's history. The club competed in the New South Wales Rugby Football League Premiership (NSWRFL), finishing the season 7th.

== Ladder ==
	Team	Pld	W	D	L	PF	PA	PD	Pts
1	Eastern Suburbs	14	9	0	5	217	160	+57	18
2	Balmain	14	9	0	5	243	205	+38	18
3	Canterbury-Bankstown	14	9	0	5	205	182	+23	18
4	St. George	14	8	1	5	307	248	+59	17
5	Newtown	14	6	2	6	219	242	-23	14
6	Western Suburbs	14	6	0	8	247	226	+21	12
7	South Sydney	14	4	0	10	193	277	-84	8
8	North Sydney	14	3	1	10	171	262	-91	7

== Fixtures ==
Round	Opponent	Result	Score	Date	Venue	Crowd	Ref
1	Eastern Suburbs	Loss	12 – 14	Saturday 19 April	Sports Ground	5,000	
2	Newtown	Loss	10 – 14	Saturday 26 April	Henson Park	8,000	
3	St. George	Loss	15 – 41	Saturday 3 May	Sports Ground	5,300	
4	Canterbury-Bankstown	Loss	10 – 14	Saturday 10 May	Belmore Oval	4,000	
5	Western Suburbs	Loss	8 – 17	Saturday 17 May	Pratten Park	3,500	
6	North Sydney	Loss	12 – 15	Saturday 24 May	Erskineville Oval	1,500	
7	Balmain	Win	16 – 10	Saturday 31 June	Leichhardt Oval	4,000	
8	Eastern Suburbs	Win	22 – 15	Saturday 21 June	Sports Ground	3,000	
9	Newtown	Win	26 – 8	Saturday 28 June	Sports Ground	8,000	
10	St. George	Loss	12 – 28	Saturday 5 July	Hurstville Oval	6,900	
11	Canterbury-Bankstown	Loss	13 – 16	Saturday 12 July	Belmore Oval	5,000	
12	North Sydney	Win	14 – 13	Saturday 26 July	North Sydney Oval	5,000	
13	Balmain	Loss	14 – 32	Saturday 2 August	Sports Ground	4,500	
14	Western Suburbs	Loss	9 – 40	Saturday 9 August	Sports Ground	1,000	
