= Fred Blann =

Australian rugby league footballer

Playing information
- Position: Wing
Club
Years	Team	Pld	T	G	FG	P
1934–36	South Sydney	12	12	0	0	36
1940	South Sydney	11	1	0	0	3

Fred Blann was an Australian rugby league footballer who played in the New South Wales Rugby Football League (NSWRFL) in the 1930s and 1940s. He played all three of his seasons with the South Sydney Rabbitohs.

== Playing career ==
Blann made his debut on the 16th of June in Round 7 of the 1934 season against the Balmain Tigers. He scored on debut on the wing, helping Souths (who were down 7-8 at half-time) keep Balmain scoreless in the second half to win 28-8. He also scored in the next round in a 14-10 loss against Eastern Suburbs. Souths would then lose two more games consecutively, before Blann's 2 tries helped Souths prevail in a 30-5 win against the under-performing University. In Round 12, Blann scored two tries again in a 11-11 draw against North Sydney - making that 4 tries in 2 games.

In the final round, he would score yet another two tries in a 18-12 win against Balmain. Blann ended the season as the club's highest tryscorer for the season with 8 tries (24 points) in 9 appearances (in front of 32-year-old John "Jack" Why and halfback Percy Williams - both with 5 tries). Souths conceded the fewest points for the season despite finishing the season fourth. They qualified for the finals and faced Eastern Suburbs in the semi-finals, losing 6-19.

In the opening round of next season, Blann scored twice in a 24-19 win against University. Souths' star player (also on the wing) Harold Thomson scored a hat trick that game. This year saw Souths have a very different lineup with 15 out of 32 players that season playing their first season with the club. Notable players last year had departed the club including Albert "Buller" Spillane and Why, who had both retired.

The following game in Round 2, Blann scored a try in a big win (37-8) against Canterbury-Bankstown (then in their maiden season). He scored in his final game of the season in a Round 3 loss to Norths. He was replaced by 18-year-old Eddie Finucane (who excelled in his first year of professional football) and would remain absent from Souths' lineup for the rest of the 1935 season. Blann concluded 1935 with 4 tries in 3 appearances. Souths finished second and defeated Northern Suburbs in the Semi-finals. They made their first grand final appearance since winning in 1932, but could not defeat the minor premiers Easts that year, losing the 1935 grand final 19-3.

Blann sat out the 1936 season for unknown reasons, presumably in retirement.

He returned to play the 1940 season. Blann appeared in a 9-5 round 2 win against Balmain, playing his first game since May 4, 1935. On May 25, Blann scored his only try of the season (and thus the final try of his career) in a 24-13 loss to Newtown. He played 11 games of Souths' 14 games that season. On June 20, 1940, Blann played the last game of his career in a lopsided 37-8 loss to Newtown. Souths finished 6th that season, missing out on the finals.

He concluded his career with 23 appearances and 13 tries (39 points).

In 2018, he was listed on the Rabbitohs' Armed Forces Roll of Honour.
