= 1935 South Sydney season =

South Sydney Rabbitohs season

- NSWRFL rank: 2nd (out of 8)
- Play-off result: Runner Up
- 1934 record: Wins: 11; draws: 0; losses: 5
- Points scored: For: 314; against: 222

Team information
- Coach: Dave Watson
- Captain: Percy Williams
- Stadium: Sydney Sports Ground

Top scorers
- Tries: Harold Thomson (16)
- Goals: Percy Williams (56)
- Points: Percy Williams (124)
← 1934	1936 →

The 1935 South Sydney Rabbitohs season was the 28th in the club's history. The club competed in the New South Wales Rugby Football League Premiership (NSWRFL), finishing the season 2nd.

== Ladder ==
	Team	Pld	W	D	L	B	PF	PA	PD	Pts
1	Eastern Suburbs	16	15	0	1	2	599	157	+442	34
2	South Sydney	16	11	0	5	2	314	222	+112	26
3	Western Suburbs	16	10	0	6	2	345	243	+102	24
4	North Sydney	16	9	1	6	2	248	253	-5	23
5	Balmain	16	8	1	7	2	320	225	+95	21
6	St. George	16	8	0	8	2	334	162	+172	20
7	Newtown	16	8	0	8	2	280	248	+32	20
8	Canterbury-Bankstown	16	2	0	14	2	150	660	-510	8
9	University	16	0	0	16	2	109	529	-420	4

== Fixtures ==
=== Regular season ===
Round	Opponent	Result	Score	Date	Venue	Crowd	Ref
1	University	Win	24 – 19	Thursday 25 April	Sports Ground		
2	Canterbury-Bankstown	Win	37 – 9	Saturday 27 April	Marrickville	4,000	
3	North Sydney	Loss	10 – 17	Saturday 4 May	Chatswood		
4	Western Suburbs	Win	14 – 12	Monday 6 May	Pratten Park	3,400	
5	Balmain	Loss	12 – 26	Saturday 11 May	Sydney Cricket Ground	15,800	
6	Newtown	Win	17 – 11	Saturday 18 May	Marrickville	4,000	
7	St. George	Loss	8 – 25	Saturday 15 June	Earl Park		
8	Eastern Suburbs	Win	18 – 11	Saturday 22 June	Sydney Cricket Ground	13,155	
9	BYE						
10	University	Win	42 – 5	Saturday 6 July	Sports Ground		
11	Canterbury-Bankstown	Win	28 – 3	Saturday 13 July	Sports Ground		
12	North Sydney	Loss	9 – 19	Saturday 20 July	North Sydney Oval		
13	Western Suburbs	Win	29 – 11	Saturday 29 July	Pratten Park	6,000	
14	Balmain	Win	18 – 10	Saturday August 3	Sports Ground	10,500	
15	Newtown	Win	21 – 13	Saturday August 10	Marrickville		
16	St. George	Win	18 – 10	Saturday August 17	Earl Park	4,500	
17	Eastern Suburbs	Loss	9 – 21	Saturday August 24	Sydney Cricket Ground	25,150	
