= Les Griffin =

Australian rugby league footballer

- Les Griffin 1935

Personal information
- Full name: Leslie Clive Griffin
- Born: 10 May 1907 Petersham, New South Wales, Australia
- Died: 27 June 1985 (aged 78) Lidcombe, New South Wales, Australia

Playing information
- Position: Centre, Wing
Club
Years	Team	Pld	T	G	FG	P
1935	St. George	14	7	25	0	125
Representative
Years	Team	Pld	T	G	FG	P
1930–31	New South Wales	10	6	0	0	18
1929–33	NSW Country	5	1	0	0	3

Leslie Clive Griffin (1907 – 1985) was an Australian rugby league footballer who played in the 1920s and 1930s.

== Playing career ==
Originally from Tumut, New South Wales, Griffin played for New South Wales in 1930 and 1931 before moving to St. George.

He played first grade for only the 1935 NSWRFL season, but in doing so created a club and NSWRFL point scoring record. In a match against Canterbury-Bankstown on 11 May 1935 at Earl Park, Arncliffe, Griffin scored 36 points (2 tries and 15 goals) in the St. George club's biggest ever win (91-6) which is still a club record for an individual player, while his 15 goals is still an NSWRFL record (held jointly with Easts legend Dave Brown.

Les Griffin

As of the 2024 NRL season, this remains the biggest recorded victory by a team and the biggest winning margin.
