= Billy Stokes =

Australian rugby league player

Playing information
- Position: Fullback, Centre, Five-eighth
Club
Years	Team	Pld	T	G	FG	P
1940–42	South Sydney	15	2	6	0	18
1944–45	South Sydney	12	0	15	0	30
	Total	27	2	21	0	48

Billy Stokes was an Australian professional rugby league footballer of the 1940s. He played 5 seasons in the New South Wales Rugby League Premiership - all for South Sydney. He was also the father of former 1960s rugby league player Bill Stokes (who also played for South Sydney).

== Playing career ==
Stokes made his professional rugby league debut in round 12 of 1940 versus Newtown. He kicked a goal, but his side lost 8-37. The following round, he kicked two goals in Souths' 24-22 win over Canterbury-Bankstown. In Round 14, Stokes scored the first try of his career in a win against North Sydney. He also kicked three goals that game, totaling nine points. He finished the season with 1 try and 6 goals (15 points) in 3 appearances.

Stokes did not play much of 1941, only making two appearances. He did not score that season, playing in double-digit losses to Balmain Tigers (Round 13) and the Western Suburbs Magpies (Round 14).

He played nine games in 1942, scoring a try in the second round against Western Suburbs. Stokes also made an appearance in the City Cup, though Souths lost to the St. George Dragons 24-10. Newtown won the City Cup that year.

Stokes did not play the following season. He opened the 1944 season however, with a 5-goal performance in a win against St. George. This time, he played fullback for the whole season - a position he played throughout 1942. He kicked 5 more goals by the season's end, finishing with 10 goals in 5 appearances.

1945 turned out to be Stokes' final season. He played fullback for the first half of the season, before transitioning to five-eighth in his final games. Round 14 - the last round of the season was Stokes' final game. His team was against Balmain, losing 12-29.

He finished his career with a respectable 2 tries and 21 goals in 26 appearances.
