= Oscar Quinlivan =

Australian rugby league footballer

Personal information
- Full name: Oscar John Quinlivan
- Born: 15 November 1897 Taree, New South Wales, Australia
- Died: 21 January 1949 (aged 51) Stanmore, New South Wales, Australia

Playing information
- Position: Centre, Wing, Lock
Club
| Years | Team | Pld | T | G | FG | P |
|---|---|---|---|---|---|---|
| 1923–30 | South Sydney | 93 | 26 | 34 | 0 | 146 |
Representative
| Years | Team | Pld | T | G | FG | P |
| 1922–24 | New South Wales | 5 | 0 | 0 | 0 | 0 |
| 1928 | NSW City | 1 | 0 | 2 | 0 | 4 |
- Relatives: Leon Quinlivan (brother); Alan Quinlivan (brother)

Oscar John Quinlivan (1897–1949) was an Australian rugby league footballer who played in the 1920s and 1930s. He played for South Sydney during the club's first golden era.

== Playing career ==
Born at Cundle near Taree, New South Wales and one of 12 brothers, Oscar Quinlivan was a wing, centre or lock who played for South Sydney for eight seasons between 1923 and 1930. He featured in four grand finals during his career, winning two of them in 1928 and 1929 and losing two in 1923 and 1924.

He was also a member of the squad that won the 1925 Premiership. He also represented New South Wales in 1922 and 1924. His youngest brother, Alan Quinlivan also played for Souths between 1938 and 1945. Three other brothers: Jack Quinlivan, Clinton Quinlivan and Leon Quinlivan also played with the club.

== Death ==
He died suddenly at his Stanmore, New South Wales home on 21 January 1949, aged 51.
