= Paul Tierney (rugby league) =

Australian rugby league footballer

Personal information
- Full name: Paul William Tierney
- Born: 1919
- Died: 1973

Playing information
- Position: Centre
Club
Years	Team	Pld	T	G	FG	P
1943–49	Eastern Suburbs	64	33	0	0	99
- Source: As of 19 March 2019

Paul William Tierney (1919–1973) was an Australian rugby league footballer in the New South Wales Rugby Football League premiership.

== Playing career ==
An Australian former serviceman, Tierney played over 60 matches for the Eastern Suburbs club in the years (1943–49). A centre, Tierney was a member of the Eastern Suburbs side that defeated Balmain in the 1945 premiership decider.

== Death ==
Tierney died in 1973.
