= Alby Thorne =

Australian rugby league footballer

Personal information
- Full name: Albert Thorne

Playing information
- Position: Wing, Centre, Fullback
Club
Years	Team	Pld	T	G	FG	P
1935–42	South Sydney	9	6	1	0	20
Representative
Years	Team	Pld	T	G	FG	P
1936	NSW Police	1	0	0	0	0
1935	Sydney Colts	1	1	0	0	3
- Source: As of 2 November 2021

Albert "Alby" Thorne was an Australian rugby league footballer who played in the 1930s and 1940s. He represented the New South Wales Police rugby league team and the Sydney Colts.

== Playing career ==
Thorne played three seasons with South Sydney of the NSWRL Premiership in 1935, 1936 and 1942 (not playing a game in 1937). He debuted in round 6 against Newtown in 1935. He played on the wing, and Souths ended up winning 17–11. This was Thorne's only game of the season. Souths lost the grand final to Eastern Suburbs 19–3 in front of 22,106 people at Sydney Cricket Ground.

In 1937, Thorne scored his first and only career goal in a 49–9 win in round 6 against University (who only won one game for the season and collected their seventh wooden spoon in eight seasons). Souths' centre, Alan Quinlivan scored five tries that game.

It wasn't until round 11 that Thorne scored his first career try, although his team ended up losing 15–16 to the Jets. He played six games that season and scored another try to total two tries for that season. Souths finished seventh out of nine, missing the finals for the first time since 1922 and it was the first time the team had finished below 4th since 1921.

Thorne made a comeback to the Souths in 1942. In his first game of the season, Thorne scored three tries off the interchange, despite being absent from playing since August, 1937. Souths won that game 18–14 against Easts. In round 3, Thorne scored his final try of the season and his career, in a 2-point loss to the St. George Dragons. He scored four tries that season, only making two appearances. Souths missed the finals for the third straight time.

Thorne played one representative game for the New South Wales Police in a 10–7 win against Sydney Firsts in April, 1936. The team however never played another game. He also played a game for the Sydney Colts, scoring one try in a 18–15 win against Goulburn. The Colts led 18–2 at half time, before hanging onto the lead after Goulburn added on 13 points in the second half. This ended up being the only time the Colts ever won a game.
