= O'Loan =

O'Loan is a surname. Notable people with the surname include:

- Declan O'Loan (born 1951), Northern Irish politician
- Nuala O'Loan (born 1951), noted public figure in Northern Ireland
- Rod O'Loan (1915–1992), Australian rugby league footballer
