= Paul McCann =

Playing information
- Position: Halfback
Club
Years	Team	Pld	T	G	FG	P
1938	South Sydney	9	1	2	0	7

Paul McCann was an Australian professional rugby league footballer who played one season in the New South Wales Rugby Football League (NSWRFL) in 1938.

== Playing career ==
Prior to playing for South Sydney, McCann played half captaining West Wyalong Juniors.

McCann made his rugby league debut with South Sydney on April 25, 1938, in Round 2 against Eastern Suburbs. The following round, he recorded his first career try in a 31–5 win over North Sydney. In Round 5, McCann scored in a win over St. George.

This time playing as a centre, he scored in his final game of his career in the last round of 1938 against Newtown. McCann concluded his career with 9 tries from 10 appearances.
