= Doug Deitz =

Australian rugby league footballer

Personal information
- Full name: Douglas Phillip Charles Deitz
- Born: 5 January 1914 Mullumbimby, New South Wales, Australia
- Died: 7 April 1994 (aged 80) Greystanes, New South Wales, Australia

Playing information
- Position: Centre, Wing
Club
Years	Team	Pld	T	G	FG	P
1932–45	North Sydney	81	10	80	0	190

Douglas Phillip Charles Deitz (1914–1994) was an Australian rugby league player who played in the 1930s and 1940s.

== Playing career ==
Deitz started his long and successful career at North Sydney in 1932 and went on to play 10 seasons with the club between 1932 and 1937, 1940–1942 and 1945.

He played over 209 grade games with Norths during his career before retiring at the end of 1942, but due to the severe player shortage in the last year of World War II, he returned for 1945, playing most of the season and kicking 26 goals for Norths. He finally retired at the conclusion of the 1945 season, and went on to coach lower grades at the club for some years.

Deitz died on 7 April 1994, aged 80.
