= Jack Wunsch =

Australian rugby league footballer

Personal information
- Full name: John Francis Wunsch
- Born: 11 July 1919; Redfern, New South Wales, Australia
- Died: 26 December 1995 (aged 76)

Playing information
- Position: Wing
Club
| Years | Team | Pld | T | G | FG | P |
|---|---|---|---|---|---|---|
| 1940–46 | South Sydney | 56 | 19 | 3 | 0 | 57 |
- Source: As of 6 December 2022

Jack Wunsch was an Australian former professional rugby league footballer who played in the 1940s. He played for the South Sydney in the New South Wales Rugby League (NSWRL) competition.

== Playing career ==
Wunsch made his first grade debut for South Sydney in round 1 of the 1940 NSWRL season against Western Suburbs at Cumberland Oval. Wunsch was a mainstay on the wing for Souths during the first half of the 1940s and was their top try scorer in 1942. However, during this time the club were in a period of decline and they only reached the finals once during his time with the team. In 1945, South Sydney finished with the Wooden Spoon and in 1946 they finished winless. Wunsch played his final game for South Sydney in round 2 of the 1946 season against Western Suburbs at Pratten Park.
