= Leon Quinlivan =

Australian rugby league player

Leon Gerald Quinlivan
Personal information
- Born: 9 February 1913; Taree, New South Wales, Australia
- Died: 27 September 1989 (aged 76)

Playing information
- Position: Centre, Wing
Club
| Years | Team | Pld | T | G | FG | P |
|---|---|---|---|---|---|---|
| 1940–44 | South Sydney | 20 | 4 | 1 | 0 | 14 |
Representative
| Years | Team | Pld | T | G | FG | P |
| 1934 | NSW Country | 1 | 1 | 2 | 0 | 10 |
- Relatives: Alan Quinlivan (brother); Oscar Quinlivan (brother)

Leon Quinlivan was an Australian professional rugby league footballer. He played 5 seasons in the New South Wales Rugby Football League premiership (NSWRFL), all for South Sydney. He is the brother of Clinton, Alan, Oscar and Jack Quinlivan - who were also rugby league players.

== Playing career ==
Quinlivan made his rugby league debut in round 4 of the 1940 season against St. George. He scored in debut, however Souths lost 8-30. Quinlivan made one more appearance for the season in a low-scoring win over Western Suburbs in Round 8. In Round 3, Quinlivan scored a try in his first game of the 1941 season in a lobsidded 15-41 loss to St. George. He scored 2 more tries for the season.

Quinlivan's round 9 try in 1941 was the final try of his career. He played 12 more games in his career. In Round 12, Quinlivan kicked his first and last goal of his career in a win over North Sydney.

He played games for second grade New South Wales representative teams in the 1930s and made a representative football comeback with the NSW Seconds in 1942.

Quinlivan's last appearance was against Balmain in the 1944 semi-finals. Balmain would go on to win the grand final that year. After South Sydney's 6-15 semi-final loss, Quinlivan retired.
