= Jimmy Stiff =

Australian rugby league footballer

Personal information
- Full name: James Claude Stiff
- Born: 7 June 1911 Sydney, New South Wales, Australia
- Died: 21 December 1937 (aged 26) Sydney, New South Wales, Australia

Playing information
- Height: 160 cm (5 ft 3 in)
- Position: Fullback
Club
Years	Team	Pld	T	G	FG	P
1935–37	South Sydney	18	1	2	0	7

James Claude Stiff (7 June 1911 – 21 December 1937) was an Australian rugby league footballer. He was also notable as an Australian rules footballer and is a member of the NSW Australian Football Hall of Fame.

== Biography ==
Stiff was born in Sydney and educated at Gardeners Road Public School.

An all round sportsman, Stiff was a New South Wales Schoolboys representative in cricket and during his immediate post school years was committed to Australian rules football, playing as a rover for South Sydney. His highlight as an Australian rules footballer came representing New South Wales at the 1933 Sydney Carnival, where he claimed the Conder Cup as the tournament's best and fairest player. He switched to rugby league in 1935 to play for the Rabbitohs and was primarily utilised at fullback in his three first grade seasons.

Stiff died at a hospital in 1937 of injuries sustained when he crashed his motorcycle into a car on Botany Road.
