= Athol Stewart =

Australian rugby league player (1919–2001)

Personal information
- Full name: Athol Neville Stewart
- Born: 7 April 1919 Bombala, New South Wales, Australia
- Died: 7 June 2001 (aged 82) Bombala, New South Wales, Australia

Playing information
- Position: Wing
Club
Years	Team	Pld	T	G	FG	P
1938–45	Newtown Jets	47	45	0	0	135
Representative
Years	Team	Pld	T	G	FG	P
1938–40	New South Wales	7	7	0	0	21

Athol Neville Stewart (7 April 1919 – 7 June 2001) was an Australian rugby league player.

A native of Bombala, New South Wales, Stewart joined the Newtown Jets for the 1938 NSWRFL season and immediately established a place on the wing, with his form rewarded by selection to the New South Wales side for their interstate series against Queensland. He finished his first season as the club's top try–scorer (12).

Stewart left Sydney in 1939 to play for Maitland United.

In 1940, Stewart returned to Newton and was again their top first–grade try scorer. He also represented New South Wales in his second interstate series, securing two tries in their 52–11 win over Queensland at the SCG.

Stewart continued with Newtown in 1941, missing only one first–grade match, and at the end of the season featured in their successful State Cup campaign. His offseason was marked by ill health after he contracted the mumps, which caused him to lose a stone and a half in body weight.

During World War II, Stewart served in the AIF 3rd Battalion and was involved in the hostilities in New Guinea, where he received a gunshot wound to his right arm.

Stewart missed three seasons due to the war. He returned for one final season in 1945.
