= Ken Foster =

Australian rugby league footballer (1918–1985)

Personal information
- Full name: Kenneth Delmore Foster
- Born: 7 December 1918 Gloucester, NSW, Australia
- Died: 10 September 1985 (aged 66)

Playing information
- Position: Wing, Centre
Club
Years	Team	Pld	T	G	FG	P
1942	St. George	5	2	0	0	6
1945	Eastern Suburbs	4	1	0	0	3
	Total	9	3	0	0	9

Kenneth Delmore Foster (7 December 1918 – 10 September 1985) was an Australian rugby league footballer.

Foster, a national surfing champion, had stints with St. George and Eastern Suburbs in the 1940s. He played for St George in the 1942 NSWRFL season and marked his first–grade debut with two tries in a win over Newtown. In 1945, Foster moved on to Eastern Suburbs and was one of their wingers in that year's premiership–winning team.

During World War II, Foster served as a warrant officer in the Garrison Artillery.

Foster was later landlord of the Star Hotel in Wauchope.
