= George Shankland =

Australian rugby league footballer

Personal information
- Full name: George Shankland

Playing information
- Position: Wing
Club
Years	Team	Pld	T	G	FG	P
1932	Eastern Suburbs	3	0	1	0	2
1935	South Sydney	5	2	0	0	6
	Total	8	2	1	0	8
- Source: As of 23 April 2019

George Shankland was an Australian professional rugby league footballer who played in the 1930s. He played for Eastern Suburbs and South Sydney in the New South Wales Rugby League (NSWRL) competition.

== Playing career ==
Shankland made his first grade debut for Easts against Western Suburbs in Round 5 1932 at the Sydney Sports Ground kicking a goal in a 24–13 victory. Shankland only made 3 first grade appearances for Easts in his 3 seasons at the club as he failed to break into the star studded line up featuring the likes of David Brown, Fred Tottey and Tom Dowling.

In 1935, Shankland joined Easts arch rivals South Sydney. Souths would go on to reach the 1935 NSWRL grand final against his former club. Souths went into the game as the underdogs as Easts had only lost 1 game throughout the entire year. In the final, Easts went into the halftime break leading 9-0 and won the match 19–3 in front of 22,000 people at the Sydney Cricket Ground. Shankland scored a consolation try in the final for Souths. The grand final defeat would also be the players last game for the club.
