= Arthur Mather (rugby league) =

Australian rugby league footballer

Mick Mather
Personal information
- Full name: Arthur Edward Mather
- Born: 3 May 1918; Parramatta, New South Wales
- Died: 4 August 2005 (aged 87); Parramatta, New South Wales, Australia

Playing information
- Position: Front-Row
Club
Years	Team	Pld	T	G	FG	P
1939–40	South Sydney	8	1	0	0	3

Arthur "Mick" Edward Mather (3 May 1918 – 4 August 2005) was an Australian rugby league footballer who played in the 1930s and 1940s.

== Background ==
Mather graduated into South Sydney's playing ranks from Marist Brothers High School, Darlinghurst. Following school, he became a fitter and turner and achieved a Higher Trade Certificate in Marine Engineering and Applied Mechanics at Sydney Technical College in 1937. Mather joined the Royal Australian Air Force in 1940 and flew bombers over Europe and the Middle East during World War II. Mather was awarded the Distinguished Flying Cross in the Siege of Tobruk. He stayed in the Air Force after the war, receiving the Air Force Cross in 1965 before retiring as an Air Commodore in 1973.

== Playing career ==
Mather made his debut with South Sydney in round 10 against Newtown in 1939. Souths won that game 13–8. That ended up being the only game he played that season. Souths finished with 9 wins out of 14 games to sneak into the finals. They defeated the home side St. George in the semi-finals 10–23, however, they lost 33–4 to Balmain in the grand final.

Mather scored his first and only career try in round 6 in a 24–13 loss to the Newtown club. He made six more appearances that season without scoring another try.

Mather ended his career in the game early – as well as his career as a water-polo player and lifesaver at Maroubra Surf Life-Saving Club – to pursue a career in the Air Force.

== Personal life ==
Mather retired from the Air Force in 1973. He died in 2005 at age 87 at The Calvary Mater Hospital in Newcastle.
