= Arthur Dean (rugby league) =

Australian rugby league player

Personal information
- Full name: Arthur Frederick Dean
- Born: 30 September 1912; Redfern, New South Wales, Australia
- Died: 11 June 1998 (aged 85)

Playing information
- Position: Centre, Lock, Halfback
Club
Years	Team	Pld	T	G	FG	P
1934–37	South Sydney	22	8	0	0	24

Arthur Dean was an Australian professional rugby league footballer who played four seasons for the South Sydney Rabbitohs of the New South Wales Rugby League Premiership.

== Playing career ==
Dean made his professional rugby league debut in round 6 of the 1934 season against Newtown. He scored a try, helping his team win 19-9. He was switched from centre to lock the following round, and scored his second try of the season in round 8 against Eastern Suburbs. Dean scored two more tries in the regular season and finished the season with 10 appearances. Souths finished 4th for the season and faced minor premiers Easts in the semi-finals. Easts won 6-19.

In 1935, Dean only made 2 appearances for the season. He would not play until round 13. The following game, Dean made his final appearance for the season and scored two tries against St. George. Souths defeated North Sydney in the semi-finals, to advance to the grand final. Dean did not play in the finals that year and Souths lost to Easts by 16 points.

Dean was moved in the halves for the majority of the 1936 season. He made 7 appearances, not scoring any tries. South Sydney had a poor season, finishing below 6th for the first time in club history. It was also the first time the club had missed the finals since 1922.

Dean only made 3 appearances in the shortened 8-game 1937 season. In Round 4, he scored 2 tries to help his team win 34-14 against Newtown. Easts won their third straight premiership as they finished with the best win-loss record for the season (no finals were played in 1937). Dean played the final game of his career in round 8 - the final round of the season - against North Sydney.

He concluded his career with 8 tries in 22 games.
