= Grantley Bennett =

Australian rugby league footballer

Personal information
- Full name: Grantley Lloyd Bennett
- Born: 17 March 1910 Wilberforce, New South Wales, Australia
- Died: 26 April 1992 (aged 82) Mona Vale, New South Wales, Australia

Playing information
- Position: Wing
Club
| Years | Team | Pld | T | G | FG | P |
|---|---|---|---|---|---|---|
| 1930–41 | North Sydney | 121 | 39 | 0 | 0 | 117 |
Representative
| Years | Team | Pld | T | G | FG | P |
| 1931–33 | NSW City Firsts | 7 | 5 | 0 | 0 | 15 |
| 1931–34 | NSW City Seconds | 4 | 4 | 0 | 0 | 12 |

Grantley Bennett (1910–1992) nicknamed Snowy was an Australian rugby league footballer who played in the 1930s and 1940s. He played in the NSWRFL premiership for North Sydney as a winger.

== Playing career ==
Bennett began his first grade career in 1930, his three other brothers Ken, Cec and Eric also played for North Sydney.

Bennett was a member of the North's teams in the 1930s where the club made the preliminary finals in 1935 but lost to South Sydney and the preliminary final in 1936 where they lost to Balmain. Bennett retired at the end of the 1941 season. Bennett also played representative football for NSW City Firsts and NSW City Seconds scoring a total of 9 tries in 11 games.

Bennett died on 24 April 1992
