= Bert Rollason =

Australian rugby league footballer (1917–1994)

Personal information
- Born: 17 February 1917
- Died: 19 December 1994 (aged 77)

Playing information
- Position: Prop, Second-row
Club
Years	Team	Pld	T	G	FG	P
1943–45	Eastern Suburbs	25	3	1	0	11

Bert Rollason (17 February 1917 – 19 December 1994) was an Australian rugby league footballer.

Rollason joined Eastern Suburbs in 1943 after making his name with West Wyalong in the Maher Cup. He had three seasons playing first–grade, starting out as a fullback in the reserves, before transferring to the forward line. In 1945, Rollason was in the second row for Eastern Suburbs in their premiership team. He left for Barmedman in 1946 and represented Southern Division against Great Britain that year in Junee.
