= Johnny Brown (rugby league, born 1916) =

Professional rugby league footballer

Playing information
- Position: Prop, Second-row, Centre
Club
Years	Team	Pld	T	G	FG	P
1937–40	South Sydney	52	10	0	0	30
1941, 1943	Balmain	5	0	0	0	0
	Total	57	10	0	0	30

Johnny Brown was an Australian professional rugby league footballer. He played for the South Sydney Rabbitohs from 1937 to 1940 and the Balmain Tigers in 1941 and 1943.

== Playing career ==
In round 1 of the 1937 season, Brown made his rugby league debut in South Sydney's huge 63-0 win over University. This was South Sydney's biggest win since the club's 67-point win over Western Suburbs in July, 1910. He played the remaining 7 games of the shorterned season (due to a Kangaroos tour).

In 1938, Brown was moved from lock to second-row and front-row. Playing in all 14 of the season's games, he experienced significant success, scoring 5 tries, including a 2-try performance in round 12 to help Souths win by 30 points against St. George. Brown played in Souths' semi-final match up against Eastern Suburbs, however his team lost 10-19.

In 1939, he played another full season, recording 3 tries. Souths defeated St. George in the semi-finals and advanced to the club's 20th grand final appearance. Brown played in the grand final at the Sydney Cricket Ground, though Souths lost to Balmain by 29 points.

Brown played another full season in 1940, this time having stints at centre. Souths had minimal success over the season. In round 13, Brown scored two tries in Souths' 24-22 win over Canterbury-Bankstown.

Brown signed with Balmain at the start of the 1941 season. He made his debut for the club in a 5-15 loss to Wests. He made 3 more appearances in 1941. While Balmain performed well in the regular season (tying with Easts and Canterbury for 9 wins for the season), they were upset by St. George 8-32 in the semi-final. Brown did not play in the semi-final.

Absent in 1942, 1943 was Brown's final season in the NSWRL. He only played one game that season in a 12-point loss to Easts. He concluded his career with 10 tries in 57 appearances.
