= Keith Wylie (rugby league) =

Australian rugby league footballer

Playing information
- Position: Wing
Club
Years	Team	Pld	T	G	FG	P
1934–36	South Sydney	15	7	0	0	21

Keith Wylie was an Australian rugby league footballer who played for South Sydney in the New South Wales Rugby League Premiership. He played three seasons with the team, playing as a winger.

== Playing career ==
Wylie played his first career game in round 11 of the 1934 season vs University. He scored two tries on debut to help his team win 30–5. He played in South Sydney's 6–19 loss to Eastern Suburbs in the Semi Finals.

In 1935, Wylie scored two tries in a round 14 win over Balmain. The following round, he scored three tries agwainst Newtown, helping his side win 21–13. South Sydney advanced to the grand final, though Wylie missed the game due to a nagging elbow injury.

Wylie played his final game in round 6 of the 1936 season against North Sydney. He concluded his career with 7 tries in 15 appearances.
