= Les McDonald (rugby league) =

Australian rugby league footballer

Personal information
- Full name: Leslie McDonald

Playing information
- Position: Fullback
Club
Years	Team	Pld	T	G	FG	P
1933–41	South Sydney	30	0	19	0	38
- Source: As of 23 April 2019

Les McDonald was an Australian professional rugby league footballer who played in the 1930s and 1940s. He played for South Sydney in the New South Wales Rugby League (NSWRL) competition.

== Playing career ==
McDonald made his first grade debut for South Sydney against Western Suburbs in Round 12 1933 at Pratten Park. McDonald's first 2 seasons at Souths were spent as an understudy to Albert Spillane. After the retirement of Spillane, McDonald became Souths first choice fullback in 1935.

Souths would go on to reach the 1935 NSWRL grand final against arch rivals Eastern Suburbs. Souths went into the game as the underdogs as Easts had only lost 1 game throughout the entire year. McDonald was selected to play for Souths in the game at fullback. In the final, Easts went into the halftime break leading 9-0 and won the match 19–3 in front of 22,000 people at the Sydney Cricket Ground. In 1938, McDonald played 1 season with Kiama in the Group 7 competition and was selected for the representative team in that area.

McDonald then went on to play reserve grade for Souths upon his return and retired at the end of the 1941 season.
