= Alan Tuohey =

Australian rugby league footballer

Personal information
- Full name: Alan Tuohey
- Born: 31 August 1918 Sydney, New South Wales, Australia
- Died: 24 April 1985 (aged 66) Sydney, New South Wales, Australia

Playing information
- Position: Wing
Club
Years	Team	Pld	T	G	FG	P
1938–39	South Sydney	20	11	0	0	33
- Source: As of 23 April 2019

Alan Tuohey (1918-1985), nicknamed "Bert" and also known as Arthur Tuohey, was an Australian professional rugby league footballer who played in the 1930s. He played for South Sydney in the New South Wales Rugby League (NSWRL) competition.

== Playing career ==
Tuohey made his first grade debut in Round 11 1938 against Eastern Suburbs at the Sydney Sports Ground. Tuohey scored a try in Souths 1938 preliminary final defeat against Easts at the Sydney Cricket Ground.

In 1939, Tuohey finished as Souths joint top try scorer including 2 tries against St George in the preliminary final as the club reached the 1939 grand final against minor premiers Balmain. Tuohey played on the wing as Souths were held tryless and suffered a heavy 33–4 defeat at the Sydney Cricket Ground. The grand final defeat was also Tuohey's final game in rugby league.
