= Eddie Finucane =

Australian rugby league footballer

Personal information
- Full name: Edward James Finucane
- Born: 5 April 1916; Redfern, New South Wales
- Died: 24 February 1991 (aged 74); Maroubra, New South Wales

Playing information
- Position: Wing, Centre
Club
Years	Team	Pld	T	G	FG	P
1935–36	South Sydney	25	8	0	0	24
1937	North Sydney	2	0	0	0	0
	Total	27	8	0	0	24
- Source: As of 13 February 2019

Edward James Finucane (5 April 1916 – 24 February 1991) was an Australian rugby league footballer who played in the 1930s.

== Playing career ==
Finucane played three seasons with South Sydney Rabbitohs between 1935 and 1937. He played in the Souths losing Grand Final team of 1935.

In 1937, Finucane joined North Sydney and played 2 games for the club.

Finucane died on 24 February 1991, 40 days short of his 75th birthday.
