= Albert Spillane =

Australian rugby league player

Personal information
- Full name: Albert Spillane

Playing information
- Position: Fullback
Club
Years	Team	Pld	T	G	FG	P
1929–34	South Sydney	52	2	14	1	36
Representative
Years	Team	Pld	T	G	FG	P
1932	New South Wales	1	0	0	0	0
1932	Metropolis	1	0	1	0	2

Albert Spillane was an Australian rugby league footballer who played in the 1920s and 1930s. He played for South Sydney as a fullback during the club's first golden era.

== Playing career ==
Spillane made his debut for South Sydney in Round 15 of the 1929 season against Western Suburbs. In the same year, Spillane was a member of the South Sydney side which defeated Newtown 30–10 in the grand final played at the Sydney Sports Ground.

In 1931, Spillane won his second premiership with Souths as they defeated arch rivals Eastern Suburbs 12–7 in the grand final with Spillane kicking a field goal. The following year, Spillane won his third and final premiership with Souths as they defeated Western Suburbs 19–12 in the 1932 grand final.

Spillane played two more seasons before retiring at the end of 1934. Spillane also played representative football for New South Wales featuring in one match.
