= Alan Quinlivan =

Australian rugby league footballer

Personal information
- Full name: Alan Quinlivan
- Born: 1 September 1915 Sydney, New South Wales, Australia
- Died: 17 November 1965 (aged 50) Newcastle, New South Wales, Australia

Playing information
- Position: Centre, Five-eighth
Club
Years	Team	Pld	T	G	FG	P
1936–45	South Sydney	62	42	5	0	139
1946–47	Eastern Suburbs	7	2	0	0	6
	Total	69	44	5	0	145
Representative
Years	Team	Pld	T	G	FG	P
1940	New South Wales	3	0	0	0	0
1937–40	NSW City	2	0	0	0	0
- Relatives: Leon Quinlivan (brother); Oscar Quinlivan (brother)

Alan Quinlivan (1915-1965) was an Australian rugby league footballer who played in the 1930s and 1940s. He was one of five rugby league playing brothers; Clinton, Jack, Leon and Oscar Quinlivan.

== Playing career ==
Quinlivan played for the South Sydney club for seven seasons between 1936 and 1940, 1942 and 1945. He then played two seasons with Eastern Suburbs between 1946 and 1947.

He represented New South Wales on three occasions during 1940.

== Death ==
Quinlivan died at Newcastle, New South Wales on 17 November 1965, aged 50. He is buried at Sandgate Cemetery.
