= Harry Thompson (rugby league) =

Australian rugby league footballer

Personal information
- Full name: Harold Gladstone Thompson
- Born: 11 July 1910 Moama, New South Wales, Australia
- Died: 20 March 1983 (aged 72)

Playing information
- Position: Wing
Club
Years	Team	Pld	T	G	FG	P
1933–34	Eastern Suburbs	15	7	0	0	21
1935–39	South Sydney	64	42	0	0	126
	Total	79	49	0	0	147
Representative
Years	Team	Pld	T	G	FG	P
1938–39	NSW City	2	1	0	0	3

Harry Thompson was an Australian professional rugby league footballer who played in the 1930s who played Eastern Suburbs and South Sydney as a winger.

== Playing career ==
Thompson made his first grade debut for Eastern Suburbs in 1933 as the club reached the preliminary final that year before being defeated by St George. The following year, Thompson was a member of the Easts side which reached the grand final but lost to Western Suburbs 15-12. In 1935, Thompson switched clubs and joined arch rivals South Sydney. In his first year at the club, Thompson played for Souths in the grand final against Eastern Suburbs and was on the losing side yet again. In 1939, Thompson was a member of the Souths side which reached the grand final against Balmain but suffered a heavy 33-4 loss at the Sydney Cricket Ground. This would be the last time Thompson played a first grade match. Thompson had a unique playing career in which he was the only player to have played in finals games for and against both Souths and Eastern Suburbs until Luke Keary matched this record in 2018.
