= Eddie Hinson =

Australian rugby league footballer

Edward Hinson
Personal information
- Full name: Edward John Hinson
- Born: 11 July 1913 Rosebery, New South Wales, Australia
- Died: 27 August 1986 (aged 73) Queenscliff, New South Wales, Australia

Playing information
- Position: Lock, Second-row
Club
Years	Team	Pld	T	G	FG	P
1934–45	South Sydney	98	17	0	0	51

Edward John Hinson nicknamed "Blinko" (11 July 1913 – 27 August 1986) was an Australian rugby league player who played in the 1930s and 1940s.

He later became an Olympic wrestler and an Australian heavyweight champion.

== Background ==
Hinson was born in Redfern, New South Wales on 11 July 1913.

== Playing career ==
Hinson went on to play ten seasons with South Sydney between 1934-1945 and was known to eat six raw eggs before every game. Hinson was a lock-forward and played in two Grand Finals for Souths, in 1935 and 1939 although, the team were runners-up on both occasions. He retired aged 35 at the end of the 1945 NSWRFL season.

== Death ==
Hinson died on 27 August 1986, aged 73.
