= George Kilham =

Australian rugby league footballer

Personal information
- Full name: George Gerard Kilham
- Born: 4 November 1916; Waterloo, New South Wales
- Died: 20 June 1978 (aged 61); Kogarah, New South Wales

Playing information
- Position: Lock, Second-row, Hooker
Club
Years	Team	Pld	T	G	FG	P
1935–43	South Sydney	95	16	0	0	48
1944–47	Canterbury-Bankstown	44	16	0	0	48
	Total	139	32	0	0	96
Representative
Years	Team	Pld	T	G	FG	P
1938	New South Wales	1	0	0	0	0
1938	NSW City	1	0	0	0	0

George Kilham (1916 - 1978) was an Australian rugby league footballer who played in the 1930s and 1940s.

== Playing career ==
Kilham made his debut for South Sydney in 1935 and during the same year played for Souths in the 1935 grand final defeat by arch rivals Eastern Suburbs.

In 1938, Kilham was selected to play for New South Wales and also played for New South Wales City. In 1939, Kilham was on the losing side again as Souths were defeated 33-4 by Balmain in the grand final played at the Sydney Cricket Ground.

In 1944, Kilham joined Canterbury and played in 4 seasons at the club. He captained the team in 1945 and in his final season missed out playing in the grand final against Balmain which Canterbury lost 13-9.
