= Fred Felsch =

Australian rugby league footballer

Personal information
- Full name: Frederick George Felsch
- Born: 11 December 1915 Ulmarra, New South Wales, Australia
- Died: 20 June 1963 (aged 47) North Sydney, New South Wales, Australia

Playing information
- Position: Centre, Fullback
Club
Years	Team	Pld	T	G	FG	P
1936–44	South Sydney	98	22	188	0	442
Representative
Years	Team	Pld	T	G	FG	P
1938–41	New South Wales	11	6	10	0	38
1938–42	NSW City	4	6	2	0	22
1935	NSW Country	1	0	1	0	2
- Source: As of 22 February 2019

Frederick George Felsch (1915–1963) was an Australian rugby league footballer who played in the 1930s and 1940s.

== Background ==
Felsch was born at Ulmarra, New South Wales and was of German descent,

== Playing career ==
Felsch played nine seasons with South Sydney between 1936 and 1944. He rose to become club captain in the era prior to Jack Rayner. Felsch played for the club in the 1939 NSWRL grand final against Balmain in which Souths lost heavily by a score of 33–4. Felsch scored South Sydney's only points in the match kicking 2 goals.

Felsch represented New South Wales on ten occasions between 1938 and 1941, although World War II curtailed any possibility of playing for Australia.

== Death ==
Felsch died at North Sydney on 20 June 1963, aged 47.
