= 1927 NSWRFL season =

Rugby league competition

1927 New South Wales Rugby Football League
- Teams: 9
- Premiers: South Sydney (7th title)
- Minor premiers: South Sydney (7th title)
- Matches played: 75
- Points scored: 2183
- Top points scorer(s): Alf Blair (94)
- Wooden spoon: University (3rd spoon)
- Top try-scorer(s): Benny Wearing (19)

The 1927 New South Wales Rugby Football League premiership was the twentieth season of Sydney's top-level rugby league club competition, Australia's first. Nine teams from across the city contested during the season, which culminated in South Sydney's victory over St. George in the premiership final.

== Season summary ==
The 1927 season saw a new record for length of a player's suspension. Balmain's Bill Maizey was suspended for twelve months for punching Easts player George Clamback. The season was also the last as a player in the NSWRFL for future Australian Rugby League Hall of Fame inductee, Frank Burge, who had returned as captain-coach of St. George after three seasons out of the NSWRFL.

=== Teams ===
- Balmain, formed on 23 January 1908 at Balmain Town Hall
- Eastern Suburbs, formed on 24 January 1908 at Paddington Town Hall
- Glebe, formed on 9 January 1908
- Newtown, formed on 14 January 1908
- North Sydney, formed on 7 February 1908
- South Sydney, formed on January 17, 1908, at Redfern Town Hall
- St. George, formed on November 8, 1920, at Kogarah School of Arts
- Western Suburbs, formed on February 4, 1908
- University, formed in 1919 at Sydney University

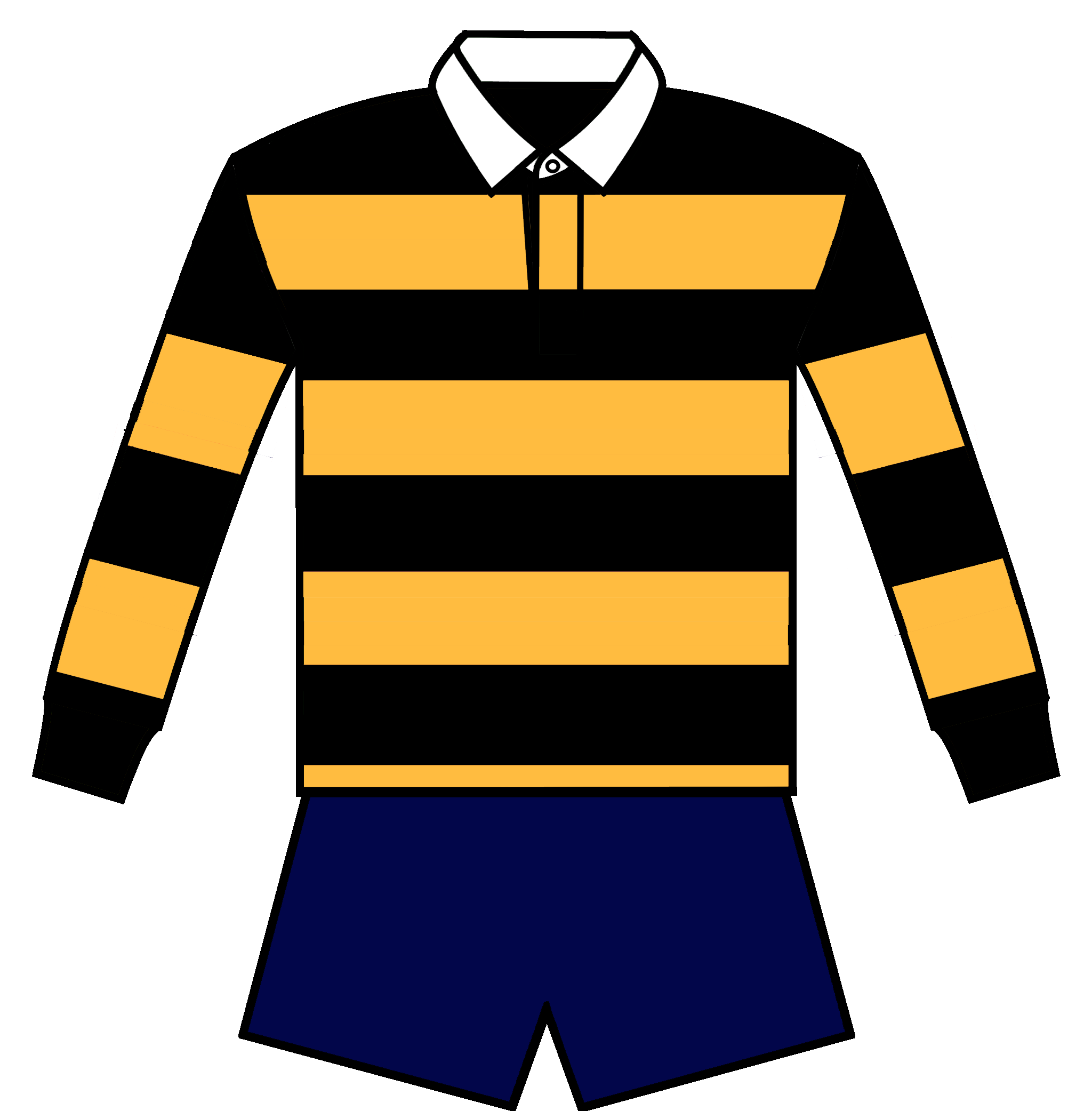
Balmain 20th season Ground: Birchgrove Oval; Coach: Alf Fraser; Captain: Norm Robinson

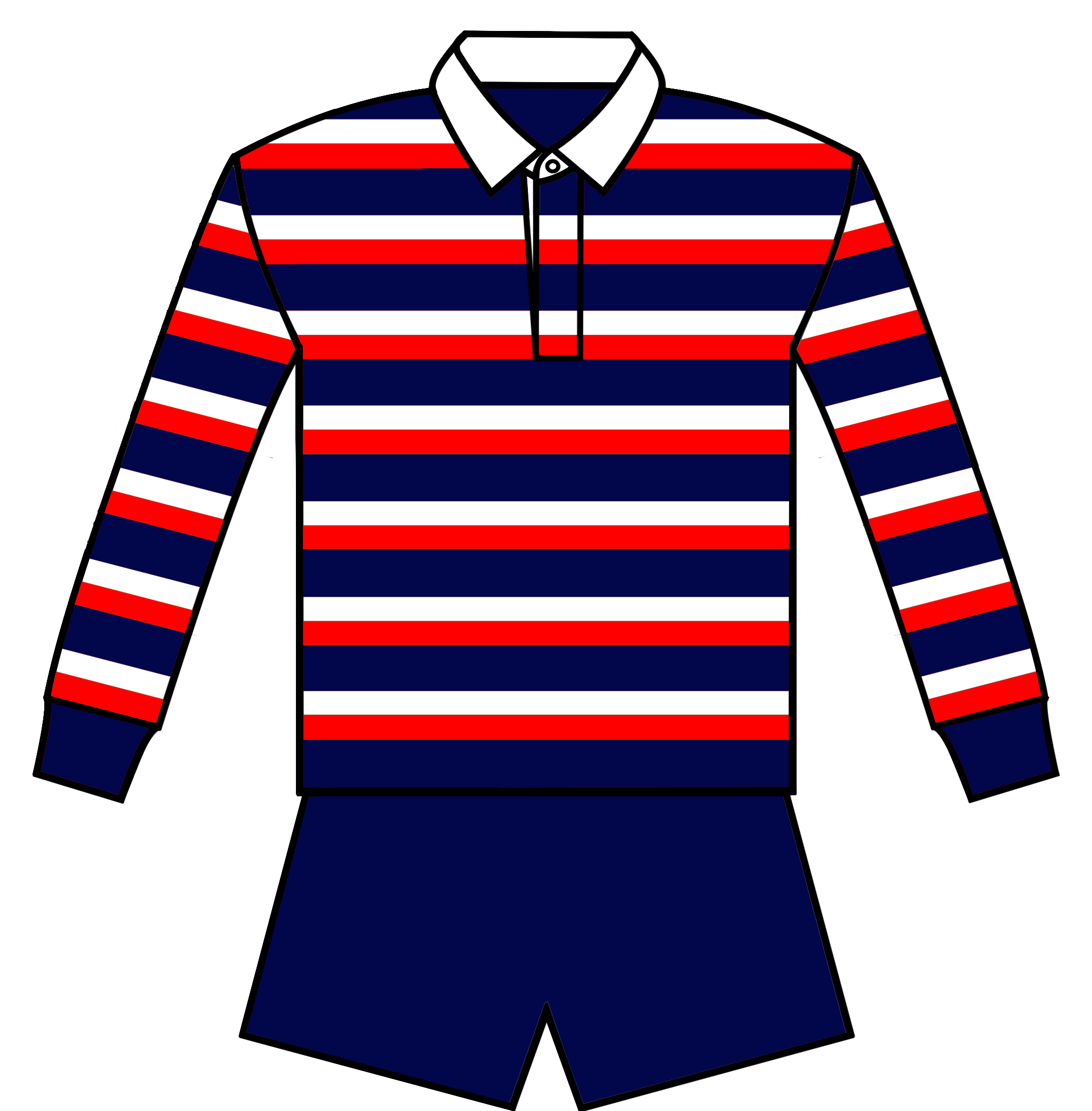
Eastern Suburbs 20th season Ground: RAS Showground; Coach: Captain: Arthur Oxford

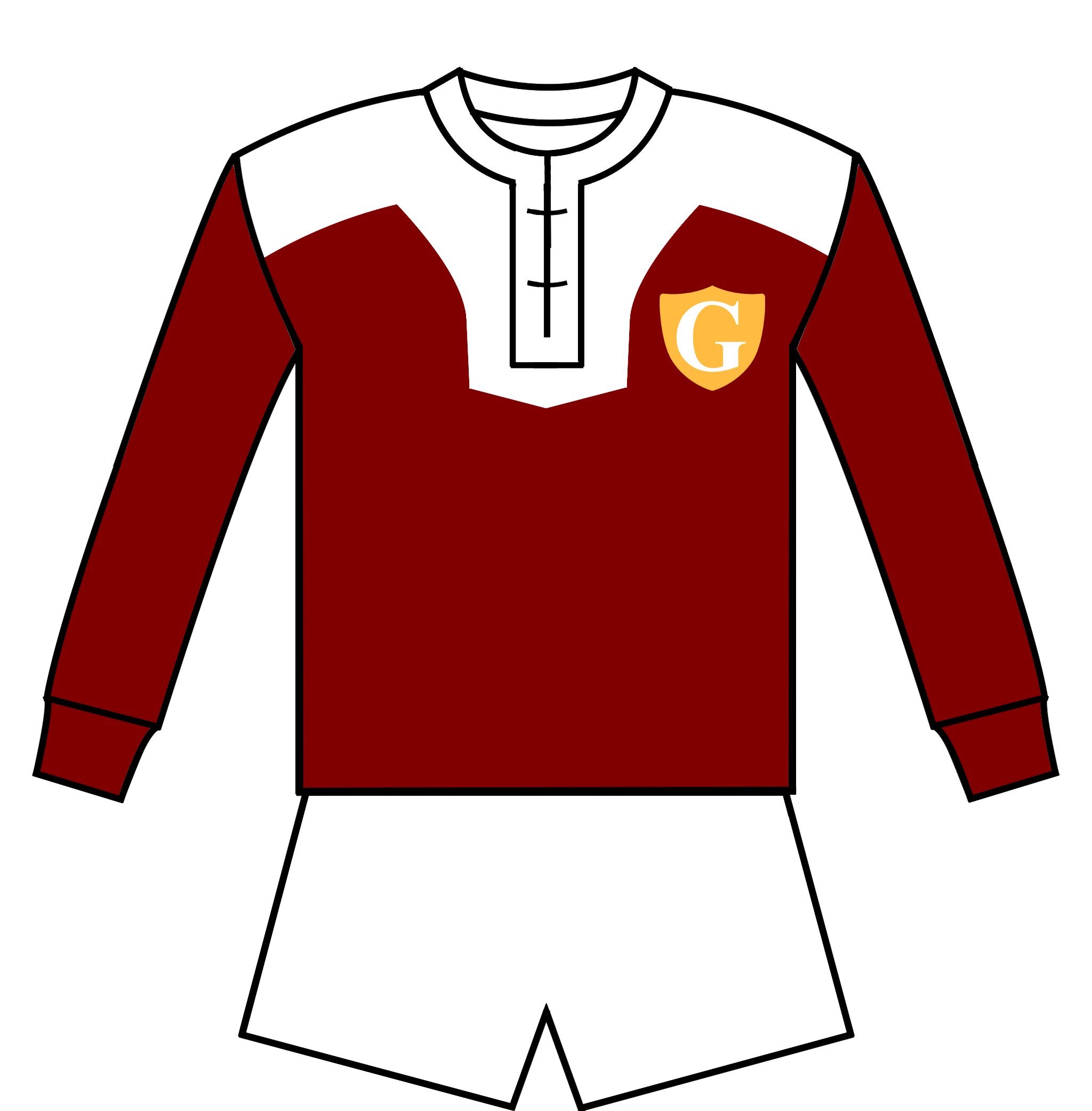
Glebe 20th season Ground: Wentworth Park; Captain: Tom McGrath

Newtown 20th season Ground: Marrickville Oval; Coach: Albert "Ricketty" Johnston; Captain(s): Charles Kell, Tom Ellis

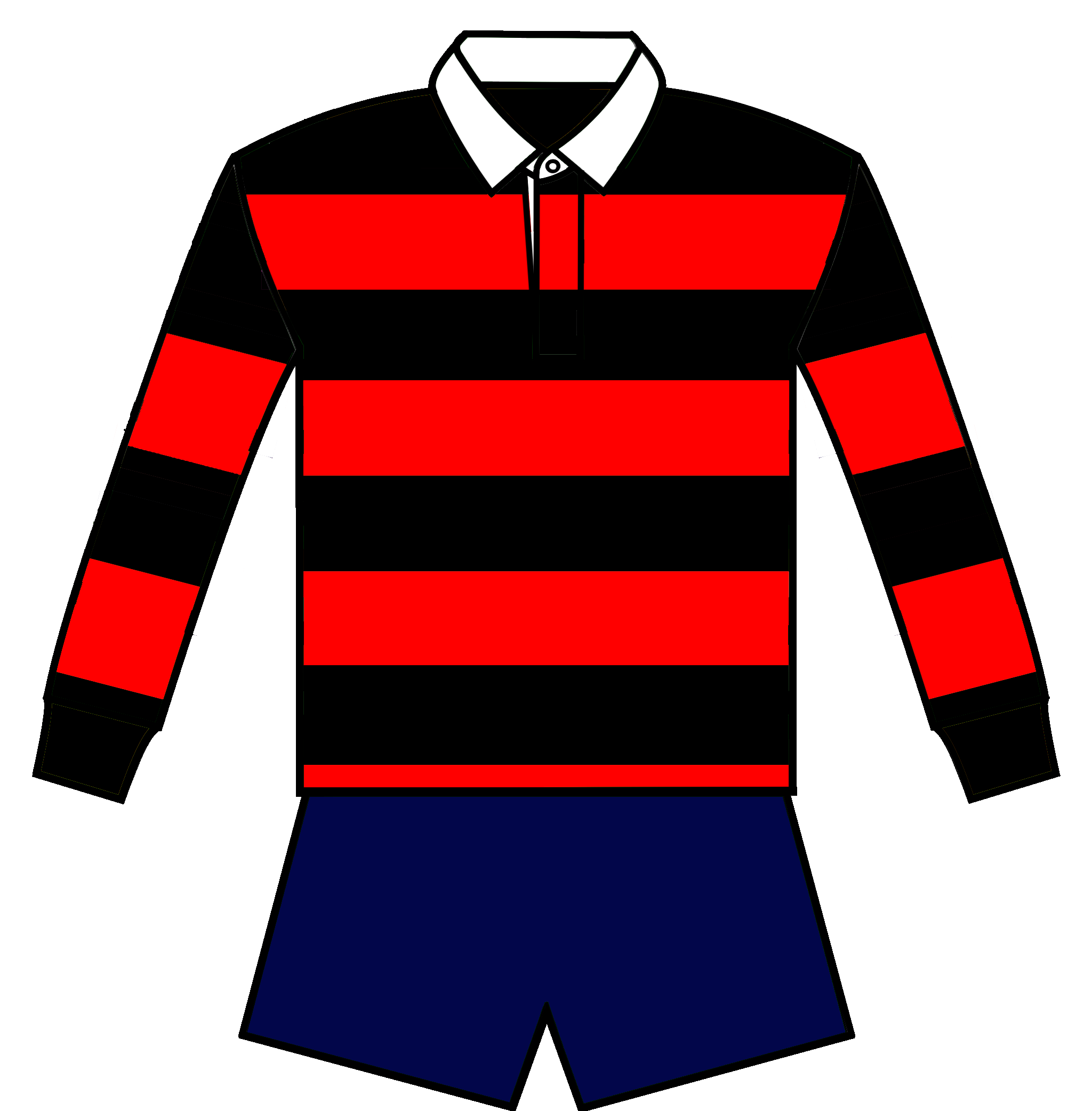
North Sydney 20th season Ground: North Sydney Oval; Coach: Captain: Leo O'Connor

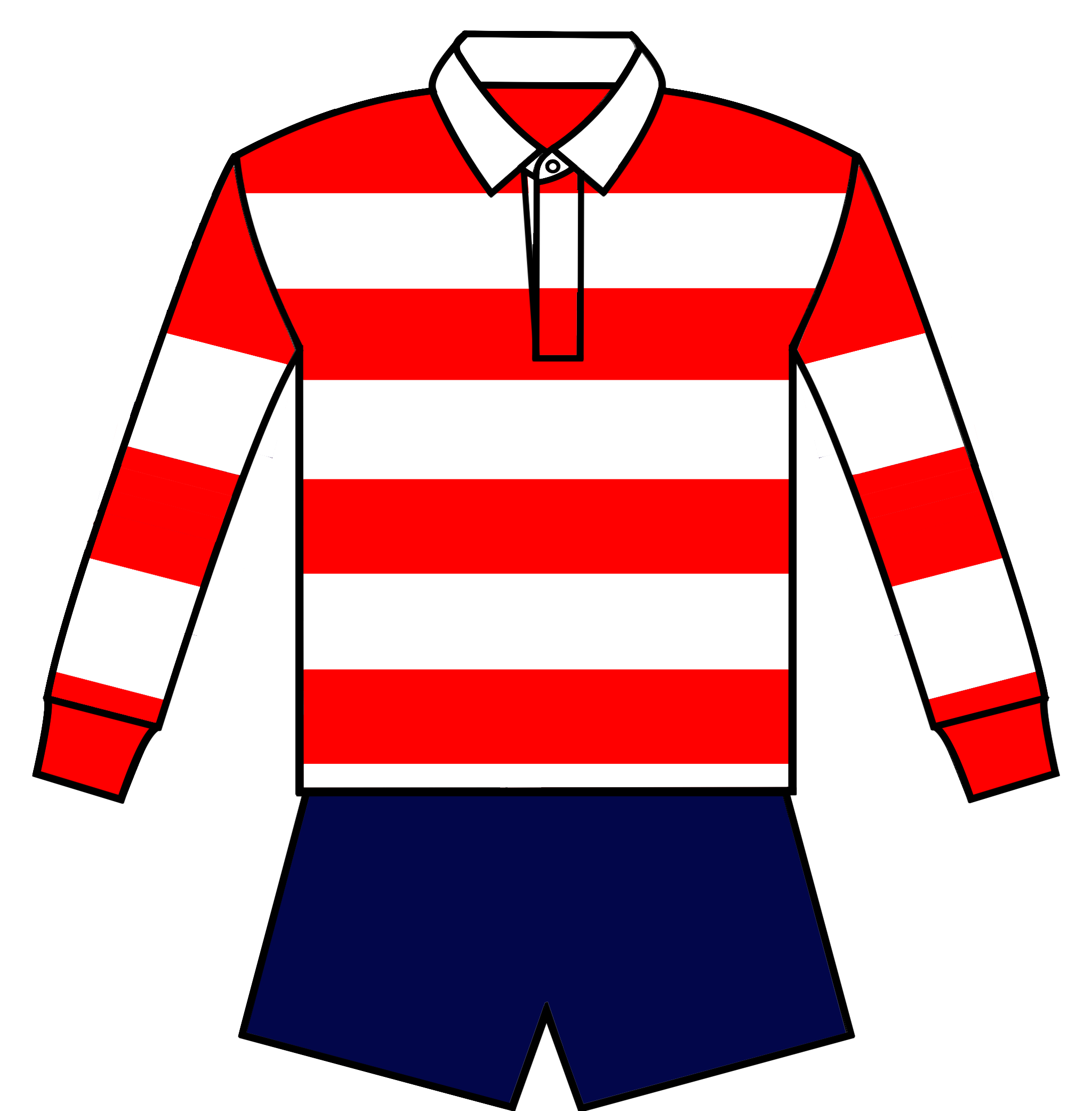
St. George 7th season Ground: Earl Park; Captain-Coach: Frank Burge

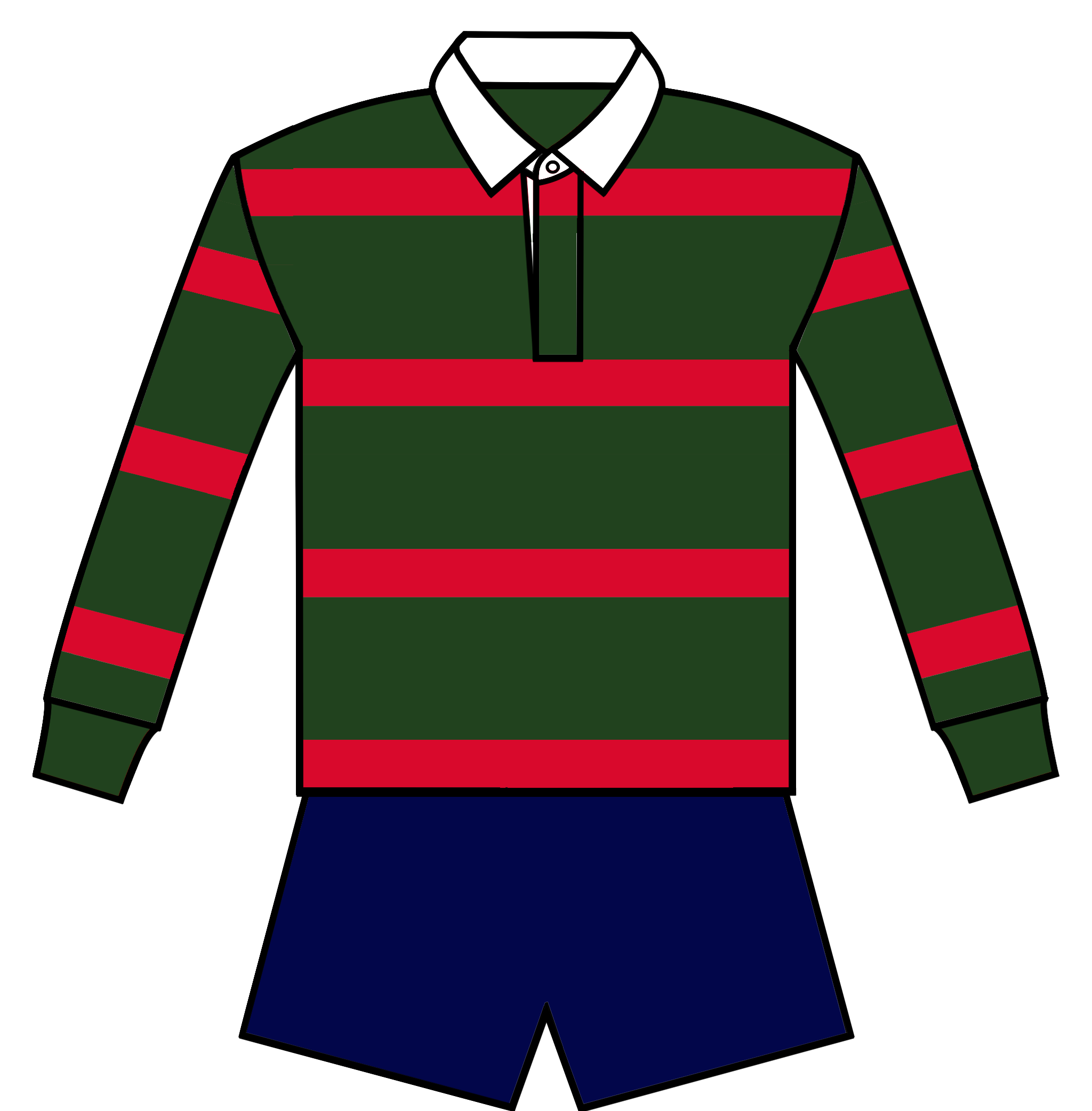
South Sydney 20th season Ground: Sydney Cricket Ground; Captain-coach: Alf Blair

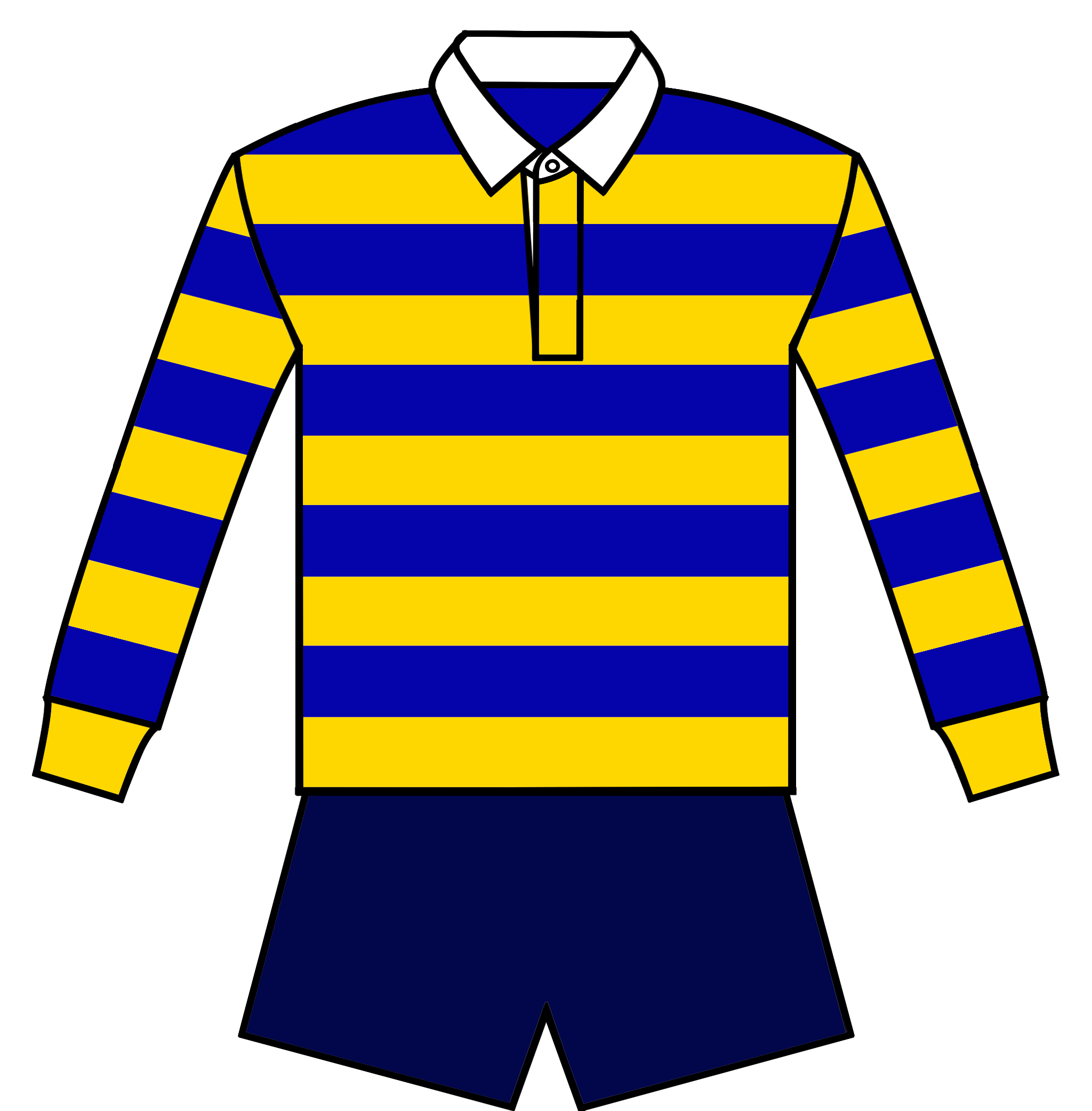
University 8th season Coach: Captain: Frank O'Rourke, Sammy Ogg

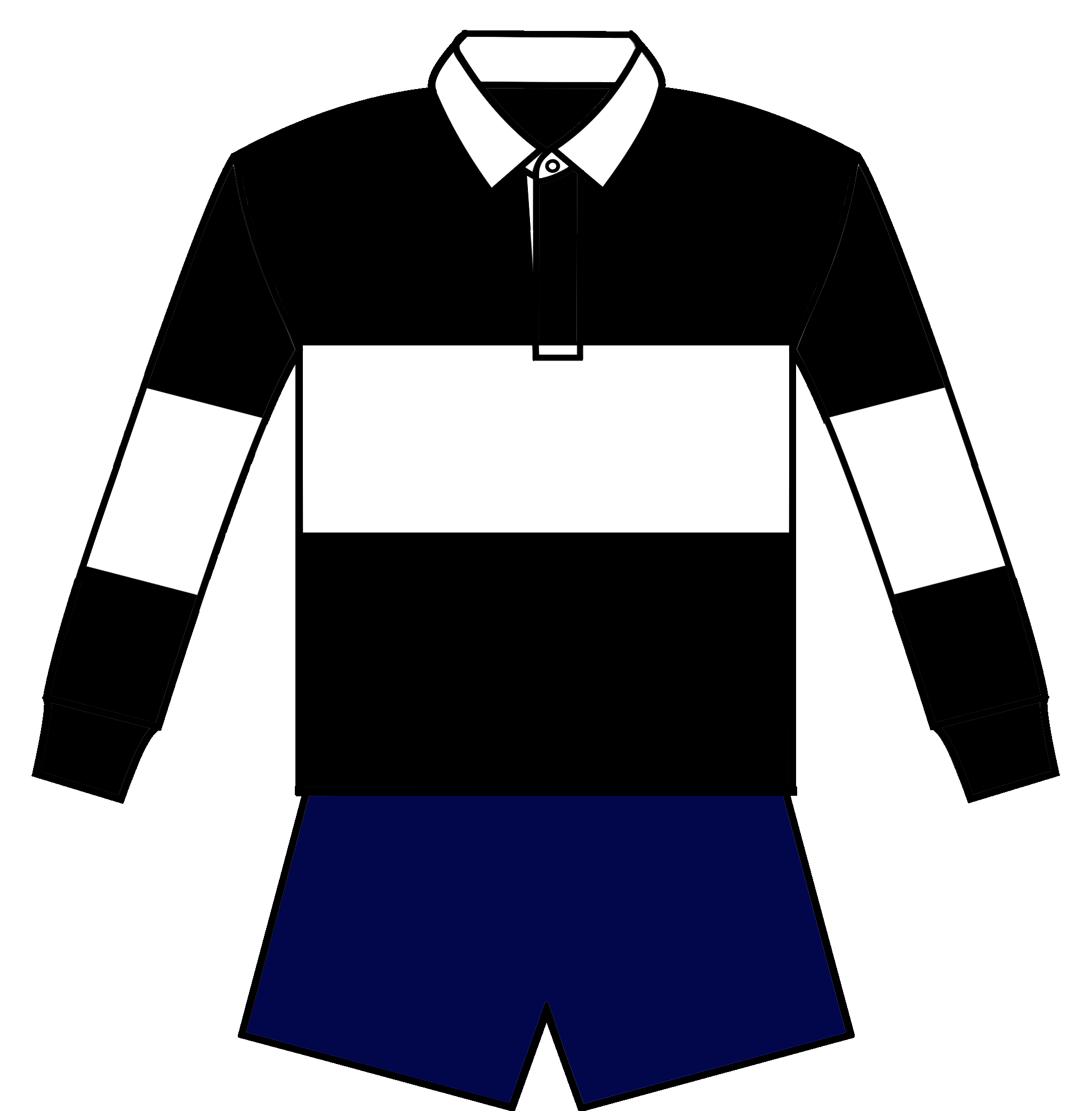
Western Suburbs 20th season Ground: Pratten Park; Coach: Clarrie Prentice; Captain: Frank McMillan

=== Ladder ===
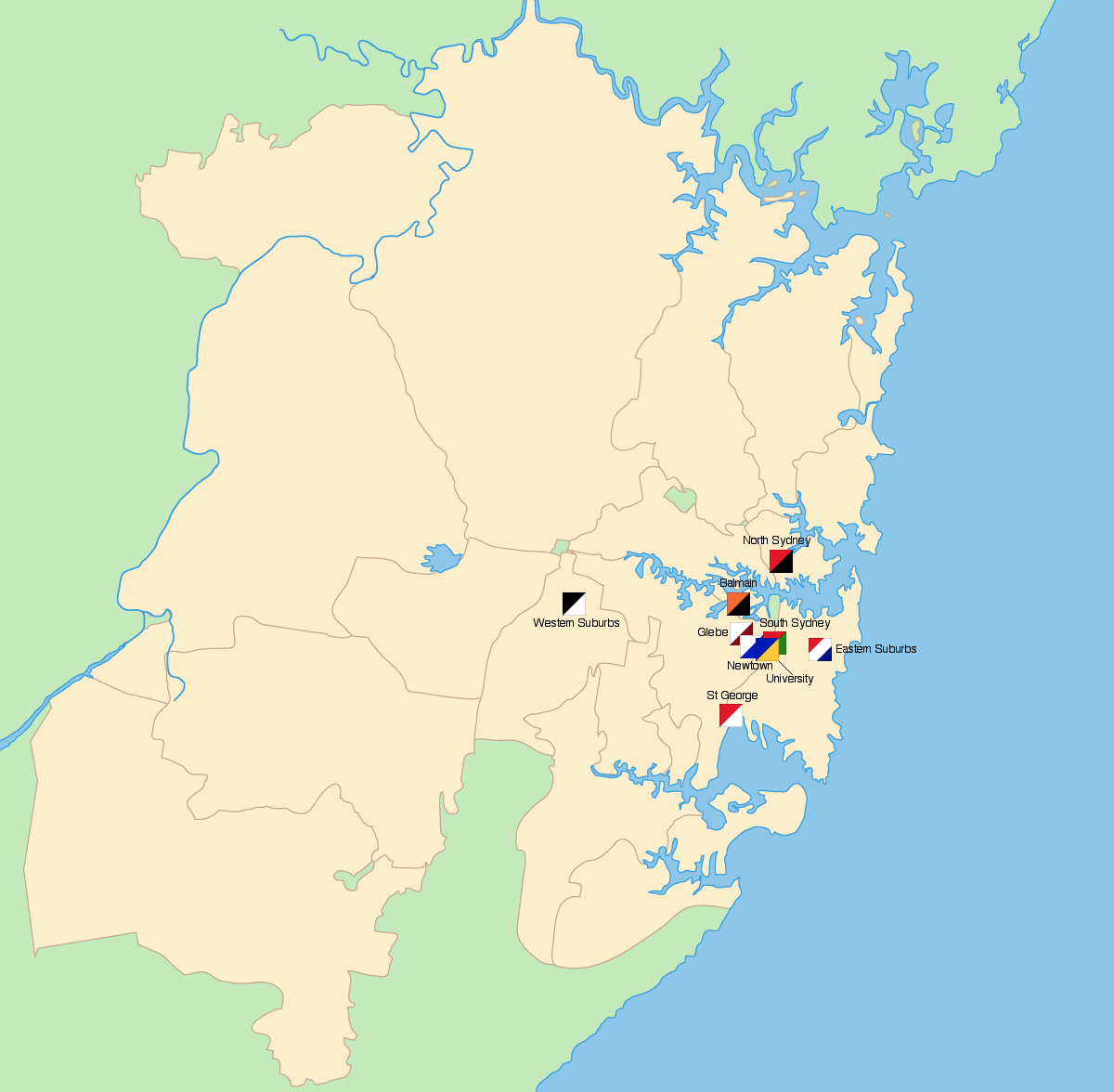
The geographical locations of the teams that contested the 1927 premiership across Sydney.

	Team	Pld	W	D	L	B	PF	PA	PD	Pts
1	South Sydney	16	14	0	2	2	402	162	+240	32
2	St. George	16	12	1	3	2	284	141	+143	29
3	Western Suburbs	16	9	0	7	2	222	182	+40	22
4	Eastern Suburbs	16	8	2	6	2	215	216	-1	22
5	Newtown	16	8	0	8	2	189	259	-70	20
6	North Sydney	16	6	1	9	2	174	256	-82	17
7	Balmain	16	5	2	9	2	210	238	-28	16
8	Glebe	16	4	0	12	2	176	297	-121	12
9	Sydney University	16	3	0	13	2	199	320	-121	10

== Finals ==
All four finalists had been decided before the end of the final round and by coincidence faced each other in the penultimate round. 1926 wooden spooners St. George had a massive turnaround in 1927, with a chance to become minor premiers in the final round when they played South Sydney who were just one point ahead of them on the ladder. However looking for their third successive title, South Sydney prevailed 22-9 in front of a large crowd of 26,649 at the Sydney Cricket Ground, and as a result took the minor premiership. On the same day, Western Suburbs and Eastern Suburbs played each other for third spot, with Western Suburbs winning 8-6.

In the semi-finals, both South Sydney and St. George overcame their opponents and were able to set up a rematch of their Round 18 game just two weeks earlier.

Semi-finals
10 September 1927 - Earl Park
St. George	26
Eastern Suburbs	11
10 September 1927 - Royal Agricultural Society Showground
South Sydney	38
Western Suburbs	6

Final
17 September 1927 - Royal Agricultural Society Showground
South Sydney	20
St. George	11

=== Final ===
South Sydney	Position	St. George
25. Harry Kadwell	FB	21. Jack McCormack
12. Benny Wearing	WG	9. Stan Brain
13. Vic Lawrence	CE	11. George Carstairs
17. Sid Harris	CE	28. Lennie Guest
15. Harry Finch	WG	12. Frank Saunders
11. Alf Blair (Ca./Co.)	FE	8. Arnold Traynor
20. Mick O'Connor	HB	7. Bill Benson
3. David Watson	PR	6. Clarrie Tye
6. Alby Carr	HK	5. Arthur Justice
31. Chas Fennell	PR	15. Tom Killiby
5. George Treweek	SR	3. Bill Hardman
8. Edward Root	SR	2. Frank Burge (Ca./Co.)
1. Harry Cavanough	LK	1. Aub Kelly

Playing on a quagmire at the Royal Agricultural Society Grounds in front of a modest crowd of 12,124 St. George contested their first ever premiership decider in their seventh year in the top league. They confronted the might of South Sydney who were reigning premiers in the two prior years and minor premiers at the end of the 1927 regular season.

The two teams had already met earlier in the season at the Sydney Cricket Ground when Souths defeated Saints 17–14 in front of a massive crowd of 31,500. With heavy rain falling throughout the match, refereed by former Rabbitoh and international Webby Neill Souths took a 13–6 lead to the half time break. The Rabbitohs won the decider scoring four tries to three to take their third successive premiership and becoming the third club to do so.

South Sydney 20 (Tries: Carr, Root, Wearing, Finch. Goals: Blair 2, Kadwell 2)

defeated

St George 11 (Tries: Justice, Carstairs, Saunders. Goal: Saunders )

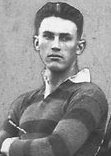
George Treweek

Edward Root

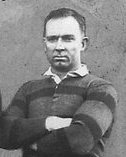
Harry Cavanough

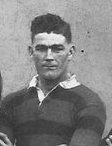
Alby Carr

Arthur Justice

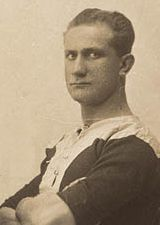
Frank Burge
