= List of South Sydney Rabbitohs coaches =

There have been 34 coaches of the South Sydney Rabbitohs since their first season in 1908.

== List of coaches ==
No.	Name	Seasons	Games	Wins	Losses	Draws	Winning Percentage	Premiers	Runners-up	Minor premiers	Wooden spoons
1	Arthur Hennessy	1908, 1918, 1946	39	22	17	0	56.4%	1908	1916	1908	1946
2	John Rosewell	1913	14	9	5	0	64.3%	—	—	—	—
3	Owen McCarthy	1924	9	6	2	1	66.7%	—	—	—	—
4	Howard Hallett	1925−1926	31	29	2	0	93.5%	1925, 1926	—	1925, 1926	—
5	Alf Blair	1927, 1944	34	24	9	1	70.6%	1927	—	1927	—
6	Charlie Lynch	1928−1934, 1937−1940	165	107	52	6	64.8%	1928, 1929, 1931, 1932	1939	1928, 1929, 1932	—
7	Dave Watson	1935−1936, 1947−1949	87	46	39	2	52.9%	—	1935, 1949	1949	—
8	Jim Tait	1941−1943	42	19	22	1	45.2%	—	—	—	—
9	Eric Lewis	1945	14	1	13	0	7.1%	—	—	—	1945
10	Jack Rayner	1950−1957	162	144	44	4	70.4%	1950, 1951, 1953, 1954, 1955	1952	1950, 1951, 1953	—
11	Clive Churchill	1958, 1967−1975	226	143	80	3	63.3%	1967, 1968, 1970, 1971	1969	1968, 1969, 1970	—
12	Denis Donoghue	1959−1963	90	30	58	2	33.3%	—	—	—	1962
13	Bernie Purcell	1964−1966	57	33	24	0	57.9%	—	1965	—	—
14	Bob McCarthy	1975, 1994	8	1	7	0	12.5%	—	—	—	1975
15	Johnny King	1976	22	8	14	0	36.4%	—	—	—	—
16	John O'Neill	1977	22	3	19	0	13.6%	—	—	—	—
17	Jack Gibson	1978−1979	45	21	23	1	46.7%	—	—	—	—
18	Bill Anderson	1980−1982	73	35	35	3	47.9%	—	—	—	—
19	Ron Willey	1983−1985	80	38	41	1	47.5%	—	—	—	—
20	George Piggins	1986−1990	124	63	55	6	50.8%	—	—	1989	1990
21	Frank Curry	1991−1993	66	20	46	0	30.3%	—	—	—	—
22	Ken Shine	1994−1997	85	22	59	4	25.9%	—	—	—	—
23	Steve Martin	1998	18	3	15	0	16.7%	—	—	—	—
24	Craig Coleman	1998−1999, 2002	54	17	37	0	31.5%	—	—	—	—
25	Paul Langmack	2003−2004	35	5	29	1	14.3%	—	—	—	2003
26	Arthur Kitinas	2004	13	3	9	1	23.1%	—	—	—	2004
27	Shaun McRae	2005−2006	48	12	35	1	25%	—	—	—	2006
28	Jason Taylor	2007−2009	73	31	41	1	42.5%	—	—	—	—
29	John Lang	2010−2011	48	22	26	0	45.8%	—	—	—	—
30	Michael Maguire	2012−2017	157	88	69	0	56.1%	2014	—	—	—
31	Anthony Seibold	2018	27	17	10	0	63%	—	—	—	—
32	Wayne Bennett	2019−2021 2025−present	99	60	39	0	60.6%	—	2021	—	—
33	Jason Demetriou	2020, 2022−2024	60	31	29	0	51.7%	—	—	—	—
34	Ben Hornby	2024	17	6	11	0	35%	—	—	—	—

== See also ==
- List of current NRL coaches
- List of current NRL Women's coaches
