= 1928 NSWRFL season =

Rugby league competition

1928 New South Wales Rugby Football League
- Teams: 9
- Premiers: South Sydney (8th title)
- Minor premiers: St. George (1st title)
- Matches played: 59
- Points scored: 1597
- Top points scorer: Benny Wearing (94)
- Wooden spoon: Newtown (3rd spoon)
- Top try-scorer: Jack Redmond (9)

The 1928 New South Wales Rugby Football League premiership was the twenty-first season of Sydney’s top-level rugby league club competition, Australia’s first. During the season, which lasted from April until September, nine teams from across the city contested the premiership, culminating in a final between Eastern Suburbs and South Sydney.

== Season summary ==
- No minor premiership was awarded, and hence no “right of challenge” arose from the finals. Only fourteen rounds of premiership matches were played, as against eighteen in 1926 and 1927.
- A dispute between the NSWRL and the Sydney Cricket Ground Trust over a number of issues lead to the League moving their match of the day to the neighbouring Sydney Sports Ground. This dispute wasn’t patched up until 1935.
- The first ever night rugby league match was played at the Sydney Showground, The match involved South Sydney and Eastern Sububs and was played on 22 December. Souths won 10–6. The match was played 9-a-side and took place without the approval of the NSWRL.
- Western Suburbs became the first Sydney club to use an animal for its nickname and logo. Wests, previously known as “The Fruitpickers” became “The Magpies”.

=== Teams ===
- Balmain, formed on January 23, 1908, at Balmain Town Hall
- Eastern Suburbs, formed on January 24, 1908, at Paddington Town Hall
- Glebe, formed on January 9, 1908
- Newtown, formed on January 14, 1908
- North Sydney, formed on February 7, 1908
- South Sydney, formed on January 17, 1908, at Redfern Town Hall
- St. George, formed on November 8, 1920, at Kogarah School of Arts
- Western Suburbs, formed on February 4, 1908
- University, formed in 1919 at Sydney University

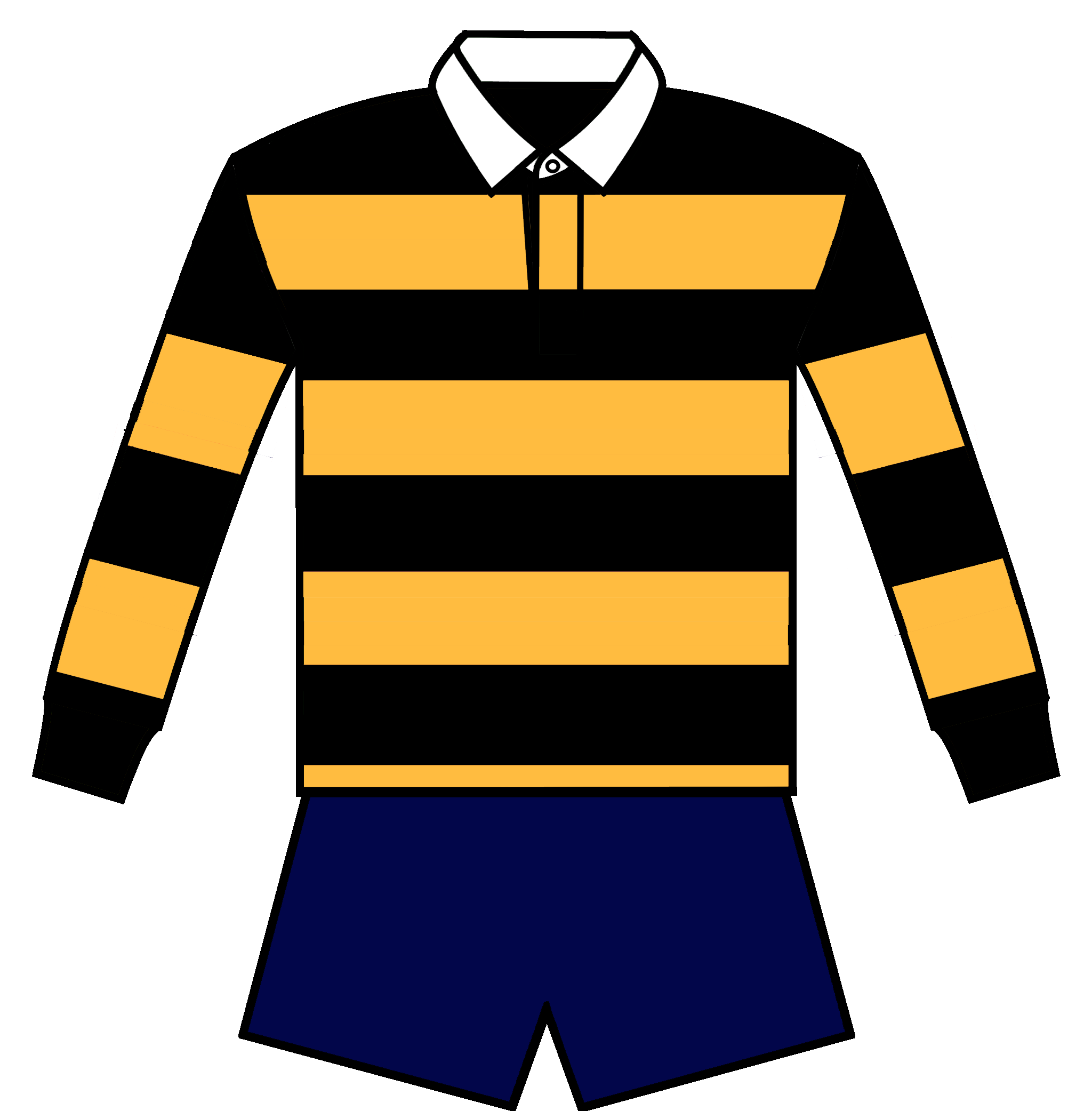
Balmain 21st season Ground: Birchgrove Oval; Coach: Alf Fraser; Captain: Ray Elliott

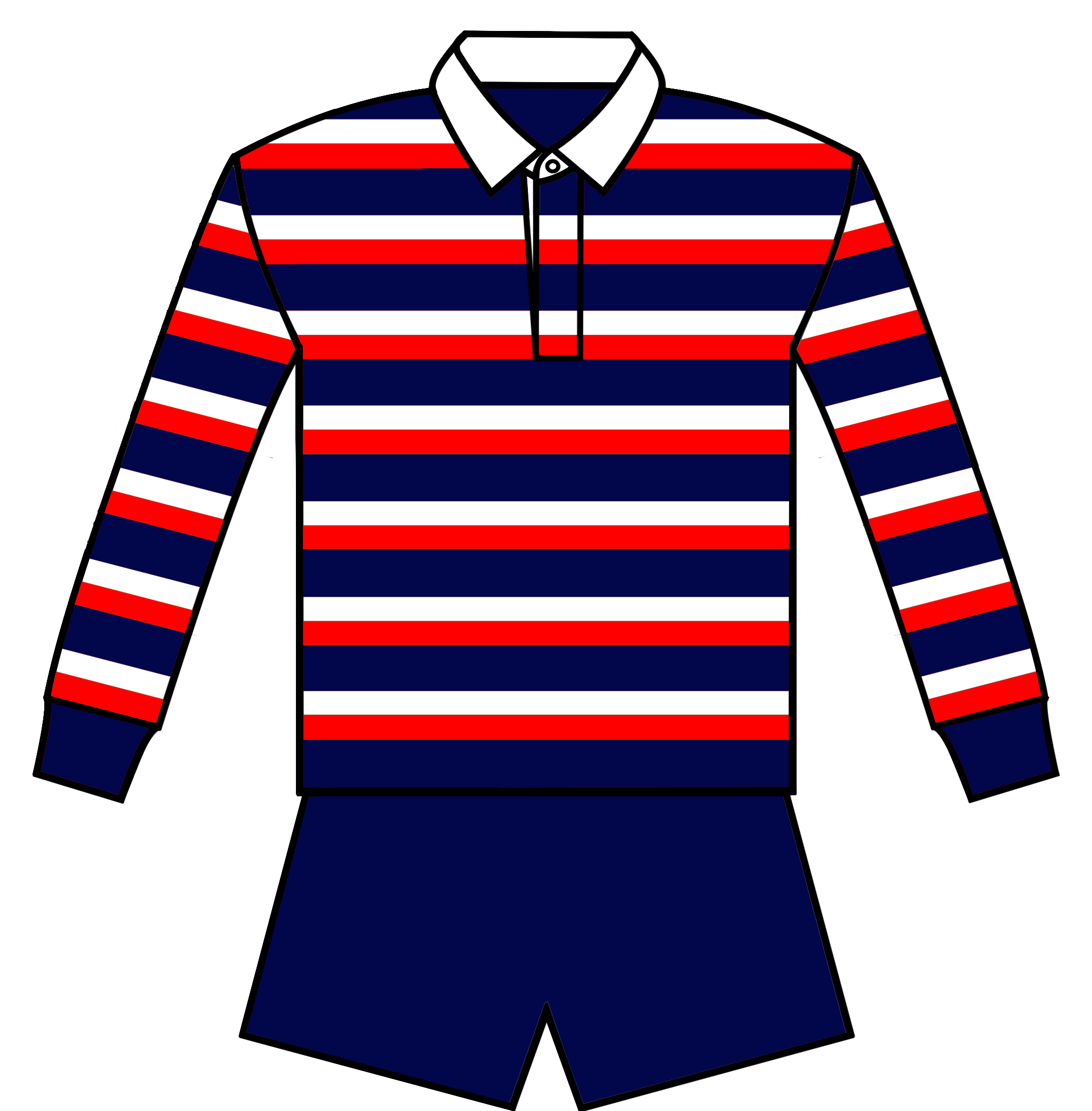
Eastern Suburbs 21st season Ground: RAS Showground; Captain: Arthur Toby

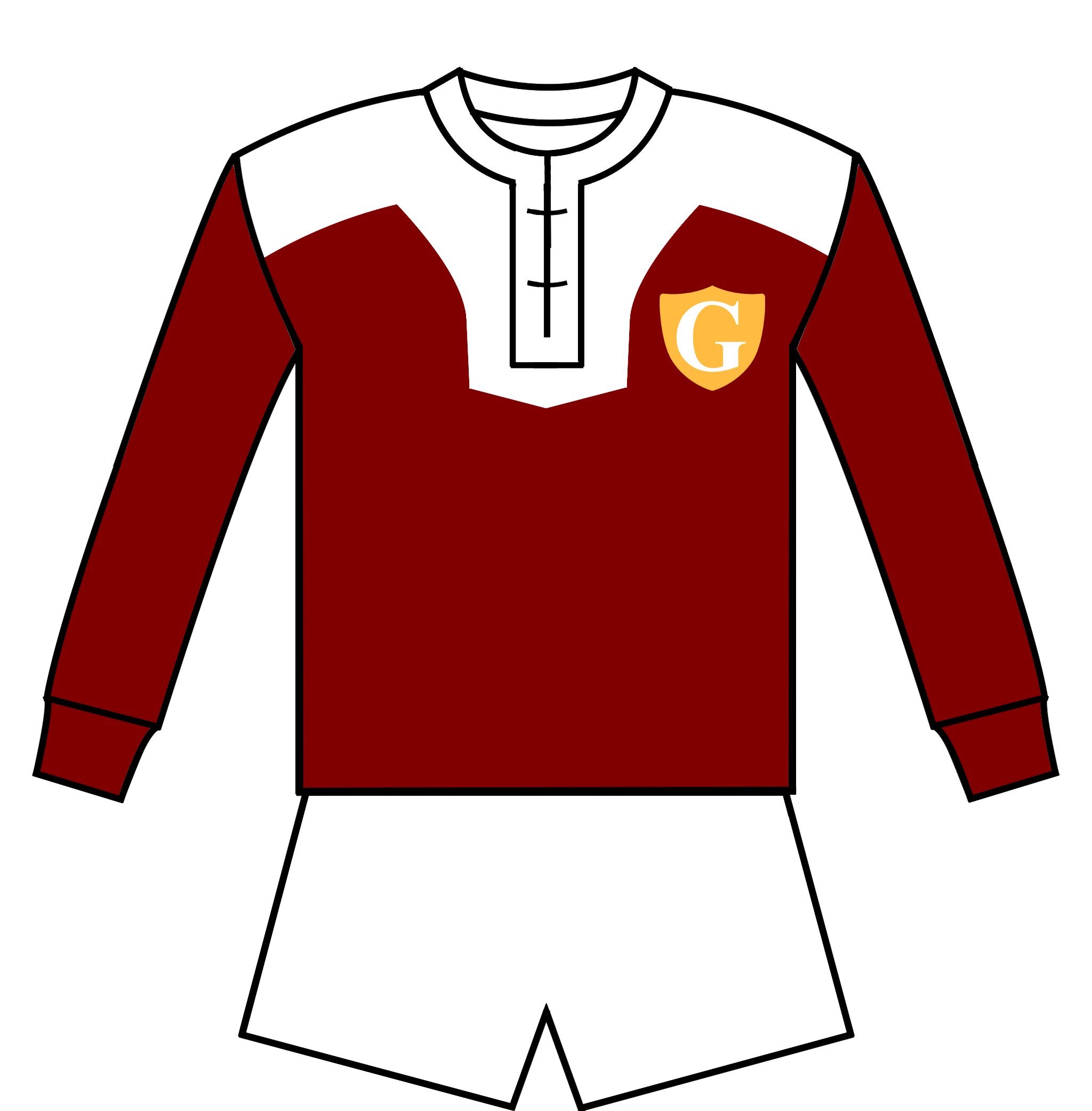
Glebe 21st season Ground: Wentworth Park; Captain-coach: Jack Toohey

Newtown 21st season Ground: Marrickville Oval; Captain(s): Charles Kell, Keith Ellis

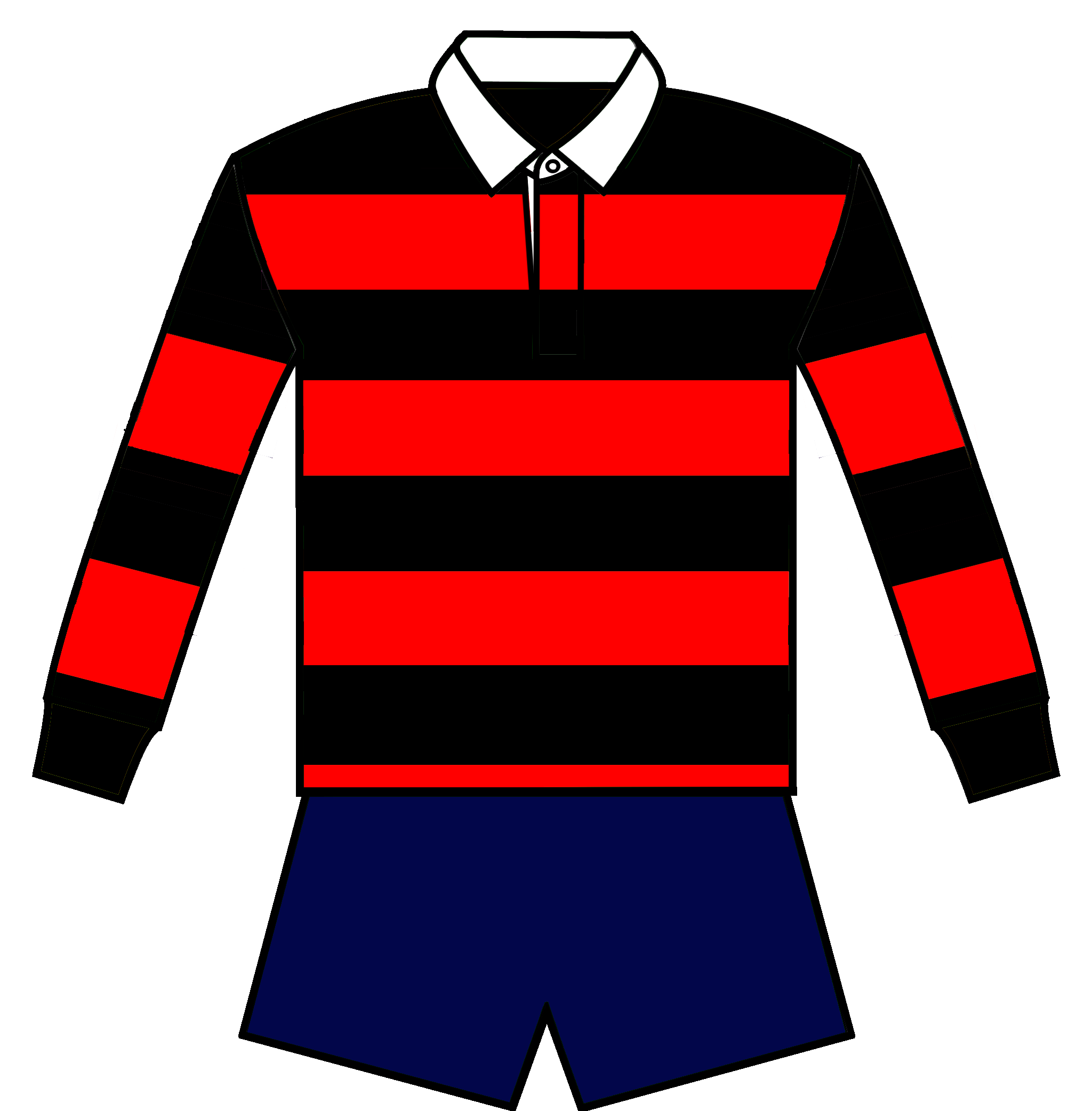
North Sydney 21st season Ground: North Sydney Oval; Coach: Tom McMahon; Captain: Jimmy Johnson

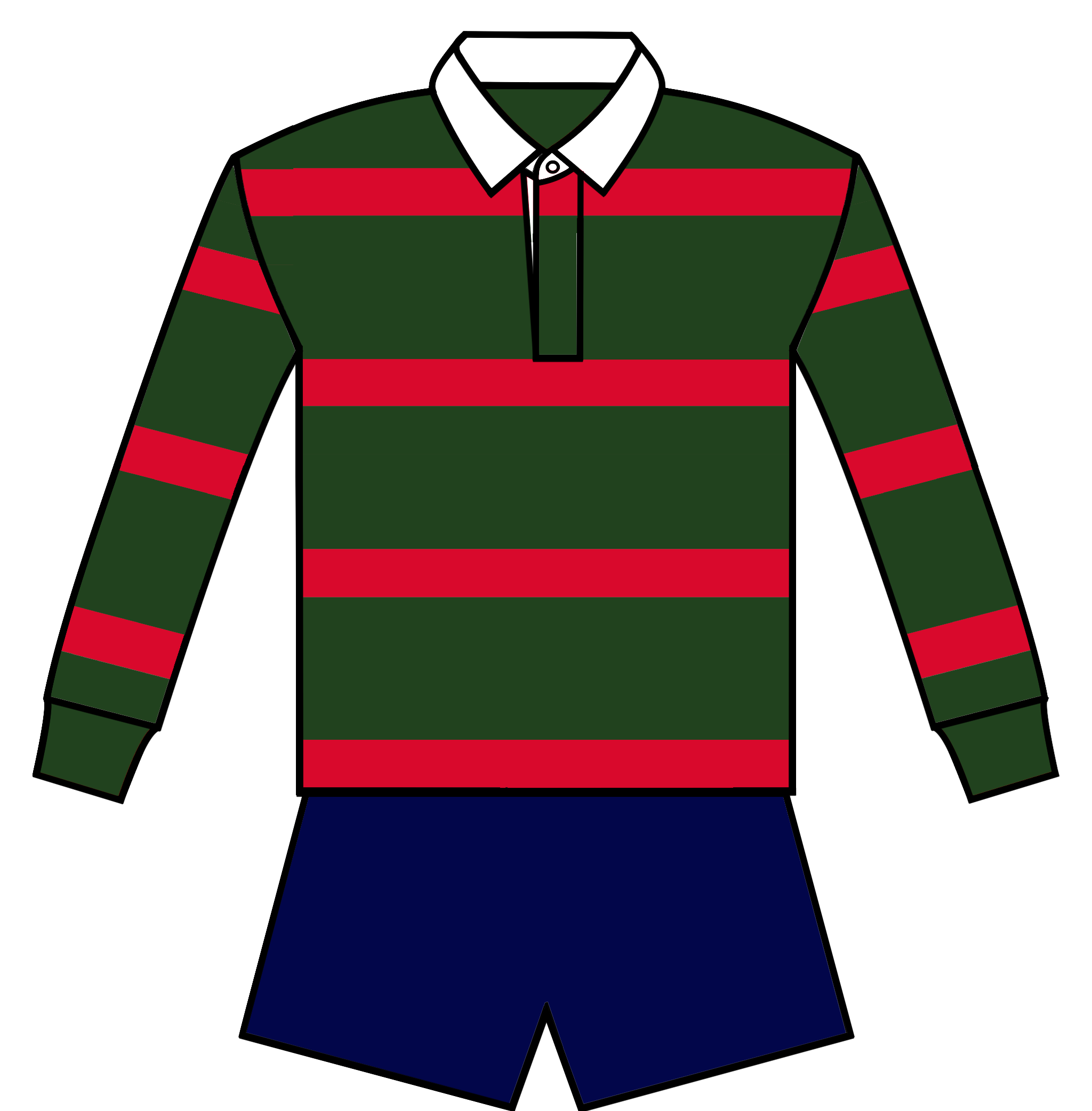
South Sydney 21st season Ground: Sydney Sports Ground; Coach: Charlie Lynch; Captain: Pat Maher

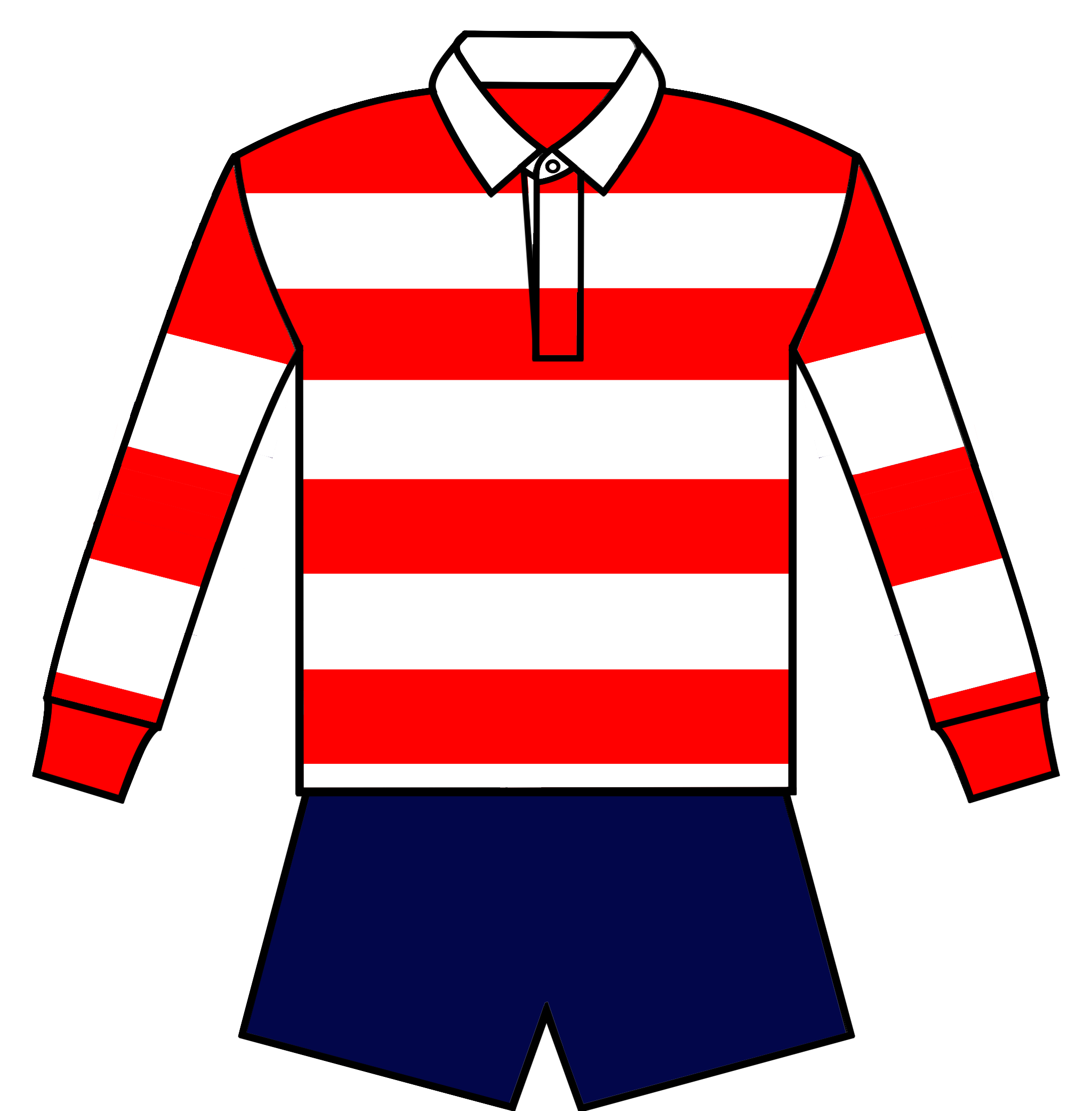
St. George 8th season Ground: Earl Park; Coach: Frank Burge; Captain: Arthur Justice

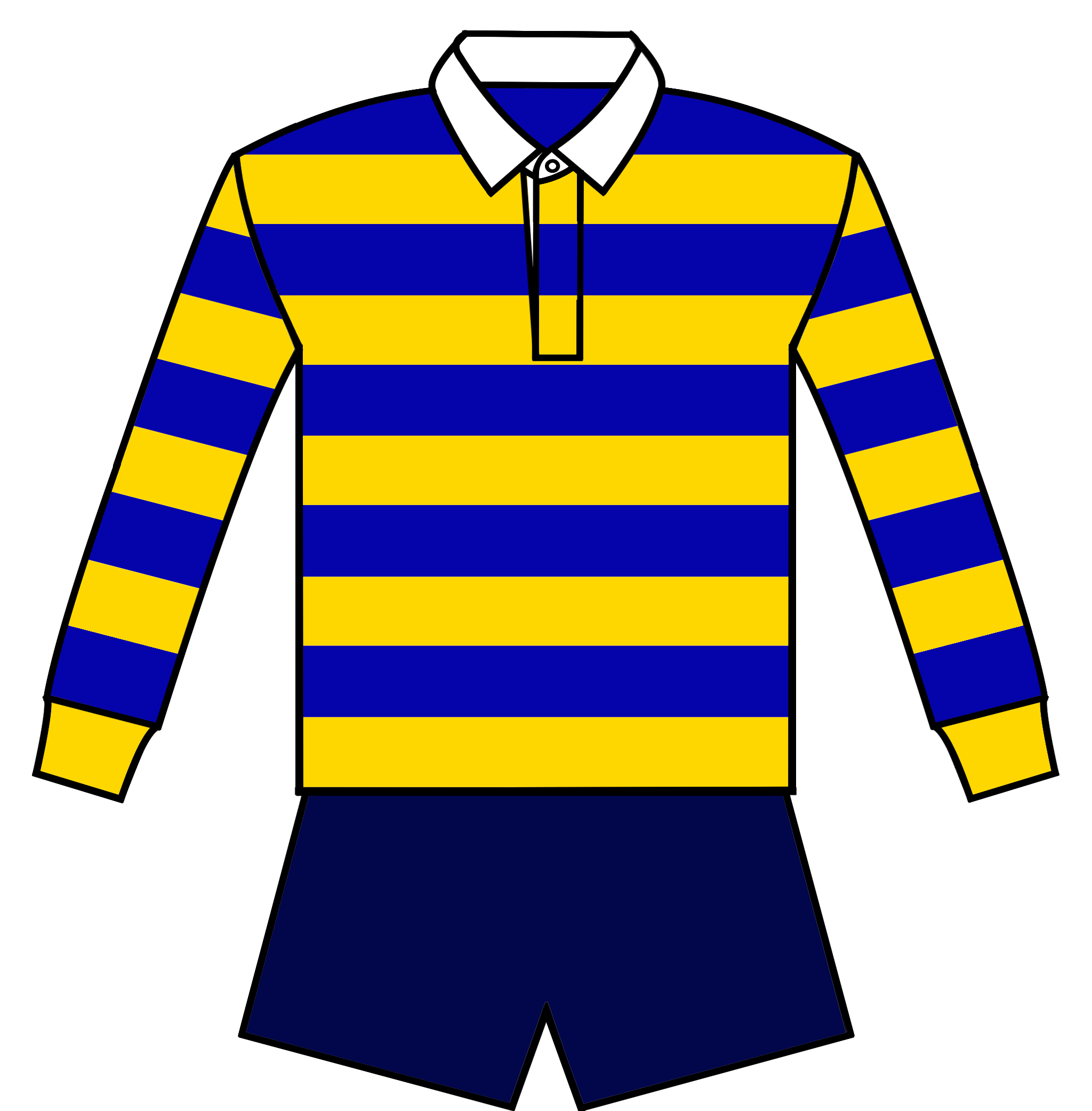
University 9th season Coach: Bill Kelly; Captain: A.S. Lane

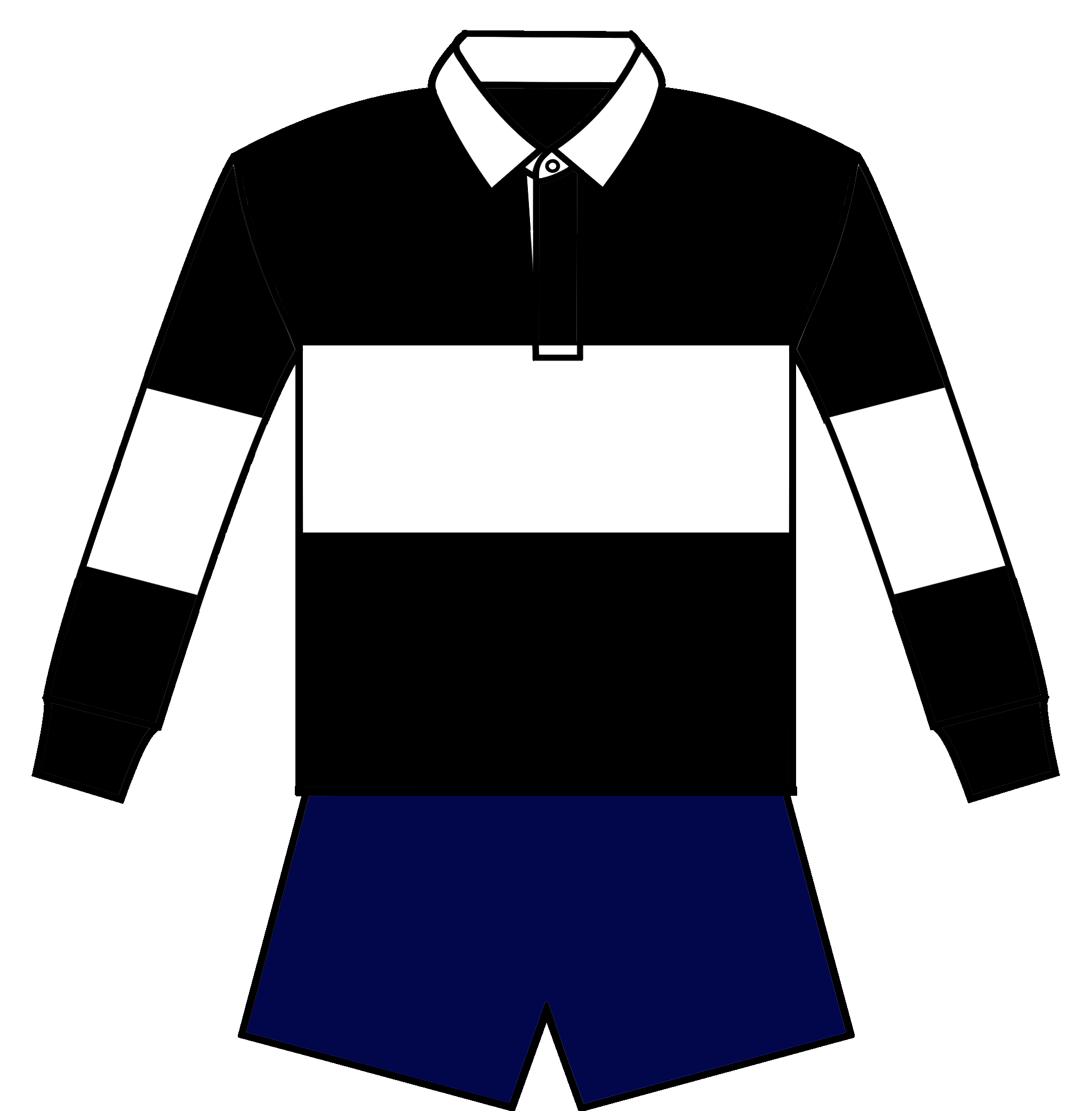
Western Suburbs 21st season Ground: Pratten Park; Coach: Chris McKivat; Captain: Frank McMillan

=== Earl Park riot ===
The season of 1928 was infamous for the Earl Park riot. In a St George home game 21–3 victory over Balmain, Tony Russell of Balmain became involved in a running feud with George Carstairs, the St George captain.

Referee Brannaghan began to lose control of the match when he sent off St George forward Harry Flower early in the second half but allowed Balmain players to stay on the field. After a later incident between Russell and Carstairs resulted in the latter being knocked unconscious and Brannaghan merely cautioning Russell, the crowd's aggravation grew and the situation escalated.

The Earl Park crowd took matters into their own hands by storming the field in an attempt to injure Russell. Police arrived and intervened using handcuffs, batons and fists but not before Russell was badly beaten by the crowd. He suffered leg and head injuries and was put into the same ambulance as George Carstairs where it was reported that Russell attempted to assault Carstairs and ambulance officers had to intervene to restrain him.

A week later, a NSWRL investigation blamed crowd violence and not the players or officials for the disturbance.

=== Ladder ===
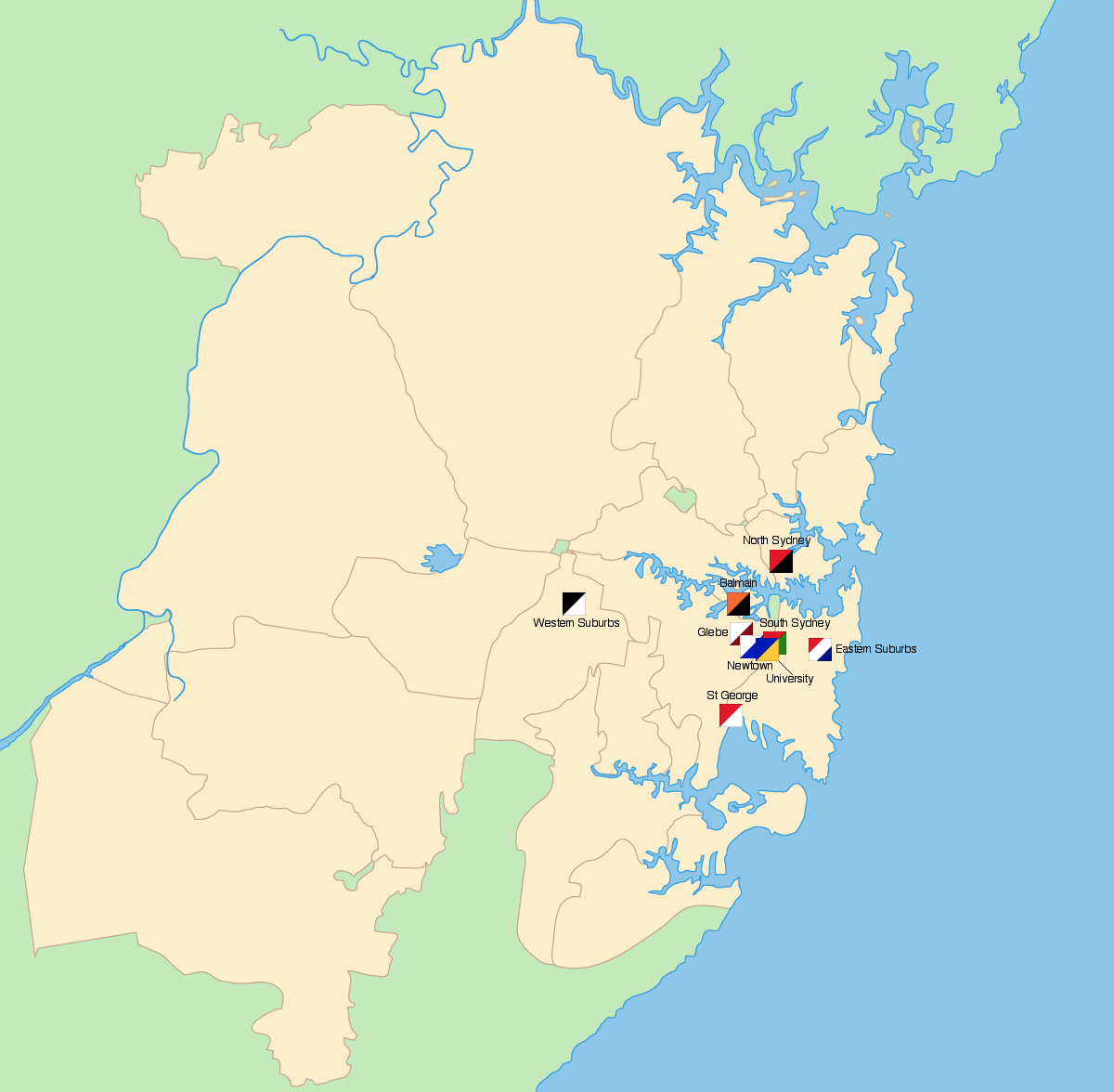
The geographical locations of the teams that contested the 1928 premiership across Sydney.

| | Team | Pld | W | D | L | B | PF | PA | PD | Pts |
|---|---|---|---|---|---|---|---|---|---|---|
| 1 | St. George | 13 | 12 | 0 | 1 | 1 | 200 | 98 | +102 | 26 |
| 2 | Eastern Suburbs | 12 | 11 | 0 | 1 | 2 | 192 | 116 | +76 | 26 |
| 3 | South Sydney | 13 | 8 | 0 | 5 | 1 | 216 | 152 | +64 | 18 |
| 4 | North Sydney | 12 | 6 | 0 | 6 | 2 | 157 | 149 | +8 | 16 |
| 5 | Sydney University | 13 | 6 | 0 | 7 | 1 | 184 | 176 | +8 | 14 |
| 6 | Western Suburbs | 12 | 4 | 0 | 8 | 2 | 174 | 206 | -32 | 12 |
| 7 | Glebe | 12 | 4 | 0 | 8 | 2 | 94 | 149 | -55 | 12 |
| 8 | Balmain | 13 | 4 | 0 | 9 | 1 | 180 | 236 | -56 | 10 |
| 9 | Newtown | 12 | 1 | 0 | 11 | 2 | 112 | 227 | -115 | 6 |

== Finals ==
Heading into the finals, top placed St. George and Eastern Suburbs were in top form, with St. George losing their only match in round 3 and Eastern Suburbs losing to St. George in round 7 of the 14-week competition. With Saints and Easts finishing on 26 points each, no playoff for the minor premiership was staged to award a right of challenge in the finals, thus negating the good work done by both sides during the premiership rounds and ultimately providing an easier route than otherwise for Souths to take the title away from both minor premiers.

In the semi-finals, Eastern Suburbs beat fourth-placed North Sydney to make the final, whilst South Sydney beat St. George, whom they had lost to 9–8 just three weeks earlier.

Semi-finals
7 September 1928 - Wentworth Oval
Eastern Suburbs | 26
North Sydney | 13
7 September 1928 - Earl Park
St. George | 5
South Sydney | 13

Final
22 September 1928 - Agricultural
Eastern Suburbs | 5
South Sydney | 26

=== Final ===
| Eastern Suburbs | Position | South Sydney |
|---|---|---|
| 13. Arthur Toby | FB | 26. Alan Righton |
| 12. Les Steel | WG | 12. Benny Wearing |
| 10. Larry Hedger | CE | 17. Jack Why |
| 11. Nelson Hardy | CE | 15. Harry Finch |
| 31. Vic Webber | WG | 27. Reg Williams |
| 8. Gordon Fletcher | FE | 16. Harry Kadwell |
| 15. Joe Busch | HB | 11. Jim Breen (c) |
| 1. Arthur Oxford | PR | 7. Harry Cavanough |
| 2. Dick Brown | HK | 41. Alf Binder |
| 4. Harry Kavanagh | PR | 1. David Watson |
| 3. Tom Fitzpatrick | SR | 3. Edward Root |
| 21. Sam Bryant | SR | 6. George Treweek |
| 6. George Harris | LK | 13. Oscar Quinlivan |
| | Coach | Charlie Lynch |

A crowd of 25,000 were at the Royal Agricultural Society Grounds to watch the final between South Sydney and Easts, refereed by Lal Deane. George Treweek scored Souths' first try, crashing over under the posts after Easts' fullback Toby fumbled the high kick. Wearing converted. Then Jack Why, Root and Brien combined to put Williams over and Souths took an 8–0 lead. Before the half-ended Wearing kicked a penalty goal from halfway and Quinlivan crossed for another Souths try and a 13–0 lead at the break.

The second stanza started no better for Easts when Hardy took the ball close with the line wide open only to see his pass dropped. Harry Kadwell struck back for Souths who went to a 16–0 lead before the floodgates opened – Cavanough scored from the next kick-off and then Kadwell crossed again. Easts’ only try of the match was by Steel under the posts and was the last of the match with the bell sounding shortly after. Thus the Rabbitohs took their fourth successive title and become the first club to achieve this feat.

South Sydney 26 (Tries: Harry Kadwell (2), George Treweek, Reg Williams, Oscar Quinlivan, Harry Cavanough. Goals: Benny Wearing 2, Oscar Quinlivan 2)

defeated

Eastern Suburbs 5 (Tries: Les Steel. Goal: Arthur Oxford)
