= 1930 South Sydney season =

23rd season of South Sydney Rabbitohs

- NSWRFL rank: 3rd (out of 8)
- Play-off result: Lost Semi Final
- 1930 record: Wins: 9; draws: 0; losses: 5
- Points scored: For: 234; against: 174

Team information
- Coach: Charlie Lynch
- Captain: Alf Blair

Top scorers
- Tries: Benny Wearing (12)
- Goals: Alf Blair (18)
- Points: Benny Wearing (64)
← 1929	1931 →

The 1930 South Sydney Rabbitohs season was the 23rd in the club's history. The club competed in the New South Wales Rugby Football League Premiership (NSWRFL), finishing 3rd for the season.

== Ladder ==
	Team	Pld	W	D	L	PF	PA	PD	Pts
1	Western Suburbs	14	12	0	2	237	130	+107	24
2	Eastern Suburbs	14	11	0	3	316	178	+138	22
3	South Sydney	14	9	0	5	234	174	+60	18
4	St. George	14	6	2	6	161	151	+10	14
5	Newtown	14	6	1	7	194	176	+18	13
6	Balmain	14	5	2	7	214	218	-4	12
7	North Sydney	14	2	1	11	164	289	-125	5
8	Sydney University	14	2	0	12	117	321	-204	4

== Fixtures ==
=== Regular season ===
Round	Opponent	Result	Score	Date	Venue	Crowd	Ref
1	Sydney University	Win	5 – 10	Saturday 26 April	Sports Ground	5,500	
2	North Sydney	Win	21 – 14	Saturday 3 May	Sports Ground	4,500	
3	Balmain	Loss	31 – 5	Saturday 10 May	Wentworth Park	5,000	
4	Eastern Suburbs	Win	8 – 4	Saturday 17 May	Sports Ground	15,000	
5	Western Suburbs	Loss	28 – 14	Saturday 21 June	Royal Agricultural Society Showground	18,000	
6	St. George	Loss	18 – 4	Saturday 28 June	Earl Park	2,500	
7	Newtown	Win	3 – 3	Saturday 19 July	Sports Ground	8,200	
8	Sydney University	Win	35 – 7	Saturday 26 July	Wentworth Park		
9	North Sydney	Win	13 – 9	Saturday 9 August	North Sydney Oval	3,000	
10	Balmain	Win	11 – 19	Saturday 16 August	Wentworth Park	5,000	
11	Eastern Suburbs	Win	10 – 28	Saturday 23 August	Sports Ground	11,900	
12	Western Suburbs	Loss	33 – 3	Saturday 30 August	Sports Ground	10,400	
13	St. George	Loss	8 – 12	Saturday 6 September	Earl Park		
14	Newtown	Loss	30 – 13	Saturday 13 August	Sports Ground	4,700	

=== Finals ===
Semi-finals
20 September 1930 - Earl Park
Eastern Suburbs	10
St. George	11
20 September 1930 - Sports Ground
Western Suburbs	9
South Sydney	5

Final
27 September 1930 – Sports Ground
Western Suburbs	6
St. George	14
