= 1931 South Sydney season =

- NSWRFL rank: 2nd (out of 8)
- Play-off result: Premiers
- 1931 record: Wins: 9; draws: 0; losses: 5
- Points scored: For: 254; against: 176

Team information
- Coach: Charlie Lynch
- Captains: Pat Maher; Dave Watson
- Avg. attendance: 8,300

Top scorers
- Tries: Benny Wearing (15)
- Goals: Benny Wearing (34)
- Points: Benny Wearing (107)
| ← 1930 | 1932 → |

The 1931 South Sydney Rabbitohs season was the 24th in the club's history. The club competed in the New South Wales Rugby Football League Premiership (NSWRFL), finishing 2nd for the season and winning their 10th premiership.

== Ladder ==
| | Team | Pld | W | D | L | PF | PA | PD | Pts |
|---|---|---|---|---|---|---|---|---|---|
| 1 | Eastern Suburbs | 14 | 12 | 0 | 2 | 339 | 121 | +218 | 24 |
| 2 | South Sydney | 14 | 9 | 0 | 5 | 250 | 176 | +74 | 18 |
| 3 | Western Suburbs | 14 | 9 | 0 | 5 | 220 | 227 | -7 | 18 |
| 4 | St. George | 14 | 8 | 0 | 6 | 178 | 183 | -5 | 16 |
| 5 | North Sydney | 14 | 6 | 0 | 8 | 143 | 198 | -55 | 12 |
| 6 | Newtown | 14 | 5 | 0 | 9 | 205 | 194 | +11 | 10 |
| 7 | Balmain | 14 | 5 | 0 | 9 | 133 | 205 | -72 | 10 |
| 8 | Sydney University | 14 | 2 | 0 | 12 | 135 | 299 | -164 | 4 |

== Fixtures ==
=== Regular season ===
| Round | Opponent | Result | Score | Date | Venue | Crowd | Ref |
|---|---|---|---|---|---|---|---|
| 1 | Newtown | Win | 5 – 10 | Saturday 25 April | Marrickville Oval | 8,000 | |
| 2 | St. George | Win | 21 – 14 | Saturday 2 May | Sports Ground | 14,900 | |
| 3 | Western Suburbs | Loss | 31 – 5 | Saturday 9 May | Sports Ground | 15,600 | |
| 4 | Eastern Suburbs | Loss | 8 – 4 | Saturday 16 May | Sports Ground | 19,200 | |
| 5 | Balmain | Loss | 28 – 14 | Saturday 23 May | Birchgrove Oval | 3,000 | |
| 6 | North Sydney | Win | 18 – 4 | Saturday 20 June | North Sydney Oval | 4,000 | |
| 7 | Sydney University | Win | 3 – 3 | Saturday 27 June | Marrickville Oval | 1,500 | |
| 8 | Newtown | Win | 35 – 7 | Saturday 4 July | Marrickville Oval | 4,000 | |
| 9 | St. George | Win | 13 – 9 | Saturday 11 July | Earl Park | | |
| 10 | Western Suburbs | Loss | 11 – 19 | Saturday 18 July | Pratten Park | | |
| 11 | Eastern Suburbs | Loss | 10 – 28 | Saturday 25 July | Sports Ground | 14,900 | |
| 12 | Balmain | Wn | 33 – 3 | Saturday 1 August | Earl Park | | |
| 13 | North Sydney | Win | 8 – 12 | Saturday 8 August | North Sydney Oval | 4,000 | |
| 14 | Sydney University | Win | 30 – 13 | Saturday 15 August | Earl Park | 2,000 | |

=== Finals ===
| Home | Score | Away | Match Information |
| Home | Score | Away | Date and Time | Venue | Referee | Crowd |
|---|---|---|---|---|---|---|
Semifinals
| South Sydney | 16–5 | St. George | 21 August 1931 | Sydney Sports Ground | McGrath | 17,561 |
Preliminary Final
| South Sydney | 17–3 | Western Suburbs | 5 September 1931 | Sydney Sports Ground | Lal Dean | 22,767 |
Grand Final
| Eastern Suburbs | 7–12 | South Sydney | 12 September 1931 | Sydney Sports Ground | Lal Dean | 27,104 |
