= 1932 South Sydney season =

South Sydney Rabbitohs season

- NSWRFL rank: 1st (out of 8)
- Play-off result: Premiers
- 1932 record: Wins: 13; draws: 0; losses: 1
- Points scored: For: 292; against: 130

Team information
- Coach: Charlie Lynch
- Captain: George Treweek
- Stadium: Sydney Sports Ground

Top scorers
- Tries: Benjamin Wearing (11)
- Goals: Benjamin Wearing (32)
- Points: Benjamin Wearing (97)
← 1931	1933 →

The 1932 South Sydney Rabbitohs season was the 25th in the club's history. The club competed in the New South Wales Rugby Football League Premiership (NSWRFL), finishing the season as premiers and minor premiers. Initially, South Sydney lost the final to Western Suburbs, however rules at the time allowed the minor premiers the right of rematch. Souths defeated Wests, and thus were the season's premiers. Following Round 1's loss to Wests, South Sydney would win the rest of the next 13 games consecutively.

== Ladder ==
	Team	Pld	W	D	L	PF	PA	PD	Pts
1	South Sydney	14	13	0	1	292	130	+162	26
2	Western Suburbs	14	11	0	3	321	156	+165	22
3	Eastern Suburbs	14	9	0	5	253	133	+120	18
4	Balmain	14	7	1	6	204	227	-23	15
5	Newtown	14	7	0	7	201	251	-50	14
6	St. George	14	4	1	9	140	203	-63	9
7	Sydney University	14	2	0	12	134	275	-141	4
8	North Sydney	14	2	0	12	147	317	-170	4

== Fixtures ==
=== Regular season ===
Round	Opponent	Result	Score	Date	Venue	Crowd	Ref
1	Western Suburbs	Loss	12 – 13	Saturday 16 April	Sports Ground	15,600	
2	Newtown	Win	19 – 14	Saturday 23 April	Pratten Park		
3	Balmain	Win	26 – 12	Monday 25 April	Birchgrove Park	4,000	
4	North Sydney	Win	32 – 7	Saturday 21 May	North Sydney Oval	5,000	
5	Sydney University	Win	16 – 14	Saturday 11 June	Earl Park, Arncliffe	2,000	
6	Eastern Suburbs	Win	15 – 5	Saturday 18 June	Sports Ground	13,000	
7	St. George	Win	22 – 5	Saturday 25 June	Earl Park, Arncliffe	4,000	
8	Western Suburbs	Win	12 – 8	Saturday 2 July	Sports Ground	14,300	
9	Newtown	Win	21 – 17	Saturday 23 July	Sports Ground	5,000	
10	Balmain	Win	17 – 4	Saturday 30 July	Sports Ground		
11	North Sydney	Win	40 – 14	Saturday 6 August	Earl Park, Arncliffe		
12	Sydney University	Win	23 – 13	Saturday 13 August	Marrickville Oval	2,000	
13	Eastern Suburbs	Win	14 – 2	Saturday 20 August	Sports Ground	15,175	
14	St. George	Win	23 – 2	Saturday 27 August	Earl Park, Arncliffe		

=== Finals ===
Semi-finals
3 September 1932 - Sports Ground
South Sydney	26
Eastern Suburbs	8
10 September 1932 - Sports Ground
Western Suburbs	15
Balmain	7

Final
17 September 1932 - Sports Ground
South Sydney	8
Western Suburbs	23

==== Grand final ====
Although losing the final to Western Suburbs, the rules allowed the minor premiers a right to rematch in the event the minor premiers lose the final. At the time, the term "Grand Final" only referred to the match played if the minor premiers were beaten.

A grand final was scheduled on the September 24 and was the first since 1911 when Glebe was upset in both the final and grand final by Eastern Suburbs 23-10 and 11-8 respectively. South Sydney were upset in the final 8-23, but won the grand final 19–12, holding onto a 9–2 lead at half time.
