= 1933 South Sydney season =

New South Wales Rugby Football League season

- NSWRFL rank: 3rd (out of 8)
- Play-off result: Lost Semi Final
- 1933 record: Wins: 8; draws: 1; losses: 5
- Points scored: For: 182; against: 177

Team information
- Coach: Charlie Lynch
- Captain: George Treweek
- Stadium: Sydney Sports Ground

Top scorers
- Tries: Benjamin Wearing (6)
- Goals: Benjamin Wearing (17)
- Points: Benjamin Wearing (49)
← 1932	1934 →

The 1933 South Sydney season was the 26th in the club's history. The club competed in the New South Wales Rugby Football League Premiership (NSWRFL), finishing the season third.

== Ladder ==
	Team	Pld	W	D	L	PF	PA	PD	Pts
1	Newtown	14	9	0	5	183	125	+58	18
2	Eastern Suburbs	14	8	1	5	224	169	+55	17
3	South Sydney	14	8	1	5	182	177	+5	17
4	St. George	14	8	0	6	165	174	-9	16
5	Balmain	14	5	3	6	187	210	-23	13
6	Sydney University	14	5	1	8	218	216	+2	11
7	North Sydney	14	5	1	8	136	188	-52	11
8	Western Suburbs	14	4	1	9	210	246	-36	9

== Fixtures ==
=== Regular season ===
Round	Opponent	Result	Score	Date	Venue	Crowd	Ref
1	Newtown	Win	9 – 7	Tuesday 25 April	Marrickville Oval	10,000	
2	North Sydney	Win	14 – 10	Saturday 29 April	Sports Ground	5,500	
3	St. George	Win	15 – 0	Saturday 6 May	Sports Ground	11,000	
4	Eastern Suburbs	Win	12 – 7	Saturday 13 May	Sports Ground	17,200	
5	Western Suburbs	Loss	5 – 18	Saturday 20 May	Sports Ground	9,000	
6	Sydney University	Win	20 – 15	Saturday 24 June	Marrickville Oval		
7	Balmain	Win	34 – 15	Saturday 1 July	Birchgrove Park	2,500	
8	Newtown	Loss	8 – 14	Saturday 8 July	Sports Ground	7,400	
9	North Sydney	Loss	12 – 16	Saturday 15 July	North Sydney Oval		
10	St. George	Loss	4 – 11	Saturday 22 July	Sports Ground	6,100	
11	Eastern Suburbs	Loss	3 – 26	Saturday 29 July	Sports Ground	7,700	
12	Western Suburbs	Win	10 – 5	Saturday 5 August	Pratten Park	4,000	
13	Sydney University	Draw	20 – 20	Saturday 12 August	Marrickville Oval		
14	Balmain	Win	16 – 13	Saturday 19 August	Sports Ground	9,000	

=== Finals ===
Semi-finals
26 August 1933 - Sports Ground
Newtown	17
South Sydney	12
2 September 1933 - Sports Ground
St. George	13
Eastern Suburbs	10

Final
9 September 1933 - Sports Ground
Newtown	18
St. George	5
