= Harry Kavanagh =

Harry Kavanagh may refer to:

- Harry Kavanagh (rugby league) (fl. 1920s), Australian rugby league footballer
- Harry Kavanagh (footballer) (born 2002), English footballer

== See also ==
- Harry Cavanough (1898–1966), Australian rugby league footballer
