= Bill Hardman (rugby league) =

English/Australian rugby league footballer

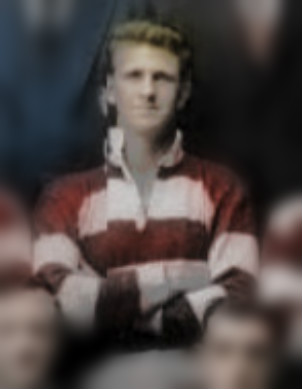

Personal information
- Full name: William Eastwood Hardman
- Born: 29 July 1900 The Fylde district, Lancashire, England
- Died: 14 April 1987 (aged 86) Mosman, New South Wales, Australia

Playing information
- Position: Second-row, Prop
Club
| Years | Team | Pld | T | G | FG | P |
|---|---|---|---|---|---|---|
| 1924–31 | St. George | 101 | 13 | 0 | 0 | 39 |
Representative
| Years | Team | Pld | T | G | FG | P |
| 1925–26 | New South Wales | 14 | 5 | 0 | 0 | 15 |
| 1925–26 | Metropolis | 2 | 2 | 0 | 0 | 6 |

William Eastwood Hardman (1900–1987) was an Australian rugby league footballer who played in the 1920s and 1930s.

== Background ==
Hardman's birth was registered in The Fylde, Lancashire, England

== Playing career ==
A St. George junior player from Brighton-Le-Sands, New South Wales, Hardman was a tough front row forward for St. George during the club's foundation years. He played eight seasons for Saints between 1924 and 1931, and played in two Grand Finals for the club: 1927 and 1930. He retired after playing his 101st first grade game on 2 May 1931. He became the third ever St. George Dragons player to achieve 100 first grade games for the club (the other two were Arthur Justice and Frank Saunders).

Hardman also represented New South Wales in fourteen games between 1925 and 1926. After retiring as a player, Hardman returned to his junior club, the Brighton Seagulls, to coach the juniors.

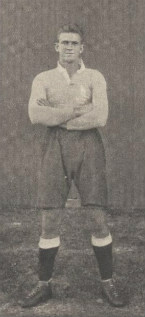
Bill Hardman NSW State Representative 1925

Uniquely, Hardman never played in any other grade but first grade. He was called from the Juniors straight to first grade and never played a lower grade game in his career.

== Death ==
Hardman died on 14 April 1987, at Mosman, New South Wales, aged 86.
