= Sidney Harris =

Sidney or Sydney Harris may refer to:

- Sid Harris (1906–1965), Australian rugby league footballer
- Sidney Harris (cartoonist) (born 1933), American science cartoonist
- Sydney Harris (judge) (1917–2009), Canadian judge and civil rights activist
- Sydney J. Harris, (1917–1986), American journalist
- Sir Sidney Harris, president of the British Board of Film Classification 1948–1960
