= Jack Why =

Australia international rugby league footballer

Personal information
- Full name: Jack Why
- Born: 3 April 1903 Wellington, New South Wales, Australia
- Died: 14 May 1944 (aged 41) Bacchus Marsh, Victoria, Australia

Playing information
- Position: Centre, Wing, Lock
Club
Years	Team	Pld	T	G	FG	P
1926–34	South Sydney	77	32	0	0	96
Representative
Years	Team	Pld	T	G	FG	P
1933	City NSW	1	0	0	0	0
1931–33	New South Wales	5	1	0	0	3
1933–34	Australia	2	0	0	0	0
- Relatives: Alby Why (brother)

Jack Why (3 April 1903 – 14 May 1944) was an Australian rugby league footballer who played in the 1920s and 1930s. A New South Wales state and Australian national representative three-quarter back, he played in the NSWRFL Premiership for the South Sydney club, winning the 1928, 1929, 1931 and 1932 titles with them. He was the brother of fellow South Sydney footballers, Oliver Why and Alby Why.

== Playing career ==
A South Sydney junior, Why began his first-grade NSWRFL Premiership career during the 1926 season. At the end of the 1928 NSWRFL season he played at centre in South Sydney's grand final victory against Eastern Suburbs, and in 1929 at lock forward in their grand final win over Newtown.

Why played on the wing in South Sydney's grand final victories over Eastern Suburbs in 1931 and Western Suburbs in 1932, scoring a try in the latter.

== Representative career ==
He was chosen as a reserve for the 3rd Test against Great Britain at the SCG on 16 July 1932, but did not take the field. Having also already played representative football for the Sydney and New South Wales sides, at the end of the 1933 season Why was chosen to go on the 1933-34 Kangaroo tour of Great Britain, becoming Kangaroo No. 189. He played in two test matches against England as well as 15 other matches on tour. The 1934 NSWRFL season was Why's last in first grade.

Why died in 1944 while rabbiting with his son and friends in the Victorian township of Bacchus Marsh, west of Melbourne.
