= Chas Fennell =

Australian rugby league footballer

Personal information
- Full name: Charles George Fennell
- Born: 21 March 1902; Sydney, New South Wales, Australia
- Died: 22 July 1970 (aged 68); Sydney, New South Wales, Australia

Playing information
- Position: Hooker, Prop
Club
Years	Team	Pld	T	G	FG	P
1927–34	South Sydney	38	3	0	0	9
- Source: As of 1 May 2019

Charles William James Fennell (1902–1970) was an Australian rugby league player in the 1920s. Fennell was a long serving South Sydney Rabbitohs player.

== Career ==
He was graded in 1926 from the Waterloo junior club and made first grade the following year. He played seven seasons at Souths between 1927 and 1934, and won a premiership with Souths in 1927. He retired in 1934, after being unable to consistently retain his first grade place for a number of years.

== Death ==
Fennell died on 22 July 1970 aged 68.
