= Arthur Toby =

Australia international rugby union & league player

Personal information
- Born: Arthur Edward Toby; 12 August 1903 Sydney, Australia
- Died: 19 November 1984 (aged 81) Eastwood, Sydney

Playing information

Rugby union
- Position: centre
Representative
Years	Team	Pld	T	G	FG	P
1924–25	Wallabies	3				0

Rugby league
- Position: fullback, centre
Club
Years	Team	Pld	T	G	FG	P
1926–29	Eastern Suburbs	54	5			15
1931–33	Balmain	41	3			9
	Total	95	8	0	0	24

Arthur E. Toby (1903–1984) was a rugby union player who represented Australia and a professional rugby league footballer in the NSWRFL.

== Rugby career ==
Toby, an auburn headed centre, was born in Sydney in 1903. He learnt his football as a youth with the Y.M.C.A junior rugby union sides and rose with that club to first grade. He later and claimed a total of 3 international rugby caps for Australia against New Zealand between 1924 and 1925.

== Rugby league career ==
In 1926 he changed codes to Rugby League where he was a very popular clubman. He played 4 seasons with Sydney Roosters between 1926 and 1929, and finished his career at Balmain Tigers, playing three seasons between 1931 and 1933. He captained Balmain in 1931. He was the fullback in Easts 26–5 loss to South Sydney in the 1928 Final.
