= Alby Carr =

Australian RL coach and former rugby league footballer

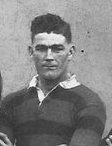

Personal information
- Full name: Albert George Henry Why
- Born: 2 August 1899 Brewarrina, New South Wales
- Died: 29 December 1969 (aged 70) Revesby, New South Wales

Playing information
- Position: Centre, Second-row
Club
| Years | Team | Pld | T | G | FG | P |
|---|---|---|---|---|---|---|
| 1922 | Newtown | 10 | 3 | 0 | 0 | 9 |
| 1924–30 | South Sydney | 68 | 31 | 0 | 0 | 93 |
| | Total | 78 | 34 | 0 | 0 | 102 |
Representative
| Years | Team | Pld | T | G | FG | P |
| 1924–25 | New South Wales | 5 | 2 | 0 | 0 | 6 |
| 1926–27 | Metropolis | 2 | 2 | 0 | 0 | 6 |

Coaching information
Club
| Years | Team | Gms | W | D | L | W% |
| 1950–52 | Canterbury-Bankstown | 36 | 14 | 1 | 21 | 39 |
- Relatives: Jack Why (brother)

Albert George Henry Why, known by the alias Alby Carr, (1899–1969) was an Australian rugby league footballer who played in the 1920s player for South Sydney, who played under his alias for most of his career.

== Playing career ==
He was born at Brewarrina in 1899. His family later moved to Redfern and he played his junior football in Wellington and later at Mascot.

As Alby Carr, he played four seasons for South Sydney between 1924 and 1927, including winning the 1926 and 1927 Grand Final's. Carr was also a premiership winner with South Sydney in 1925 as the club went the entire season undefeated. He represented New South Wales in 1924 under his alias. He played one last season with South Sydney in 1930, this time under his correct name of Alby Why. He played one season as Alby Why in 1930 before retiring. He was the brother of Australian Kangaroo, Jack Why.

Carr and Souths' teammate Sid Harris moved to England in 1927 and signed with Huddersfield. They returned to Australia two years later.

== Coaching career ==
In 1950, Alby Why coached the Canterbury-Bankstown team for a season before taking over from Vic Bulgin halfway through 1951. He continued to coach Canterbury-Bankstown in 1952.

== Alias, and exposure ==
A newspaper report from 1929 exposed Alby Carr as a 'ring-in' (Australian slang, meaning 'false'), who was actually Alby Why, the brother of Jack Why. The report was tabled at the NSWRFL on 13 May 1929. Alby Carr's true identity was revealed at the meeting regarding the 'ring-in' allegations. Alby Why tells the story: "I commenced my footballing days at Wellington in 1917. In 1921 he was at Redfern Oval and was asked to play third grade for the Mascot team as 'A.Carr'. Alby Why candidly admitted that he was Alby Carr, in what was known in the turf-world as a 'ring-in'. Then selected as A. Carr, he played one year with Newtown in 1922, then joining the City Houses Competition before being graded with South Sydney Rabbitohs in 1924. During this time and later in England playing with Huddersfield, he retained the name 'Carr', but by 1929 he wished to be recognized by his real name, as his brother Jack Why also played with Souths."

== Death ==
Albert George Henry Why died on 29 December 1969, aged 70.

== Sources ==
- Whiticker, Alan; Hudson, Glen (2007). The Encyclopedia of Rugby League Players. Wetherill Park, New South Wales: Gary Allen Pty Ltd. p. 609. ISBN 978-1-877082-93-1.
