= Harry Finch =

Australian rugby league footballer

Personal information
- Full name: Harry Alfred Finch
- Born: 20 March 1907 Newtown, New South Wales, Australia
- Died: 23 May 1949 (aged 42) Pagewood, New South Wales, Australia

Playing information
- Position: Wing, Centre
Club
Years	Team	Pld	T	G	FG	P
1925–26	Eastern Suburbs	16	3	1	0	11
1926–34	South Sydney	67	40	1	0	122
	Total	83	43	2	0	133
Representative
Years	Team	Pld	T	G	FG	P
1926–29	New South Wales	13	7	3	0	27
1929–30	Australia	0	0	0	0	0
1927	Metropolis	1	5	0	0	15
1929	NSW City	1	0	0	0	0

Harry Alfred Finch (1907–1949) was a professional rugby league footballer in Australia's leading competition – the New South Wales Rugby Football League premiership in the 1920s and 1930s. Finch was also an Australian international who played for both the Eastern Suburbs and South Sydney clubs.

== Playing career ==
Born Sydney, Australia and educated at Marist Brothers High School at Darlinghurst, Harry Finch, a wing, made his first grade debut with Eastern Suburbs in the year 1925 as an 18-year-old. He played 16 matches with Easts' in the years (1925-6). In his second year at the club Finch, was selected to make his state debut for the New South Wales rugby league team in the interstate series against Queensland.

The following season, 1927, Finch transferred to the South Sydney club where he played 62 matches in the years (1927–30) and (1933–34). Said to be an outstanding winger, Finch was a member of Souths' premiership winning teams in 1927 & 1928. Finch made his Australian debut after being selected for the 1929–30 Kangaroo tour of Great Britain. He is listed on the Australian Players Register as Kangaroo No. 157. On the tour, Finch didn't play in a Test but did represent Australia in 10 of the minor matches. Finch is recognized as Eastern Suburbs' 151st player and South Sydney's 143rd player.

== Coaching career ==
After retiring from Sydney football, Finch successfully captain-coached Cessnock to a premiership.

== Death ==
He died suddenly at his home in Pagewood, New South Wales on 23 May 1949, aged only 42.

== Sources ==
- Whiticker, Alan; Hudson, Glen (2007). The Encyclopedia of Rugby League Players. Wetherill Park, New South Wales: Gary Allen Pty Ltd. p. 609. ISBN 978-1-877082-93-1.
