= Stan Brain =

Australian rugby league footballer

- Stan Brain. St.George,1927

Personal information
- Full name: Stanley Vincent Brain
- Born: 17 January 1903; Newcastle, New South Wales, Australia
- Died: 1969; Hamilton, New South Wales, Australia

Playing information
- Position: Wing
Club
Years	Team	Pld	T	G	FG	P
1927–33	St George	63	15	0	0	45
Representative
Years	Team	Pld	T	G	FG	P
1925–28	New South Wales	6	4	0	0	12
- Source: Whiticker/Hudson

Stanley Vincent Brain (1903–1969) was an Australian rugby league footballer who played in the 1920s and 1930s.

== Career ==
Born at Newcastle, New South Wales in 1903, Brain played with St George during the club's foundation years. He played five seasons for the Saints between 1927 and 1933, and in 1929 he was captain.

Stan Brain, 1929

Brain represented New South Wales on six occasions in 1925, 1927 and 1928. He returned to Newcastle after 1932. He also played in the 1927 NSWRFL Final on the wing, of which Saints were runners up that day.

Brain died at Hamilton, New South Wales in 1969, aged 66.
