= Lennie Guest =

Australian rugby league footballer

Len Guest
- Lennie Guest 1928

Personal information
- Full name: Leonard Herbert Guest
- Born: 7 July 1908 Narrandera, New South Wales, Australia
- Died: 22 October 1965 (aged 57) Merrylands, New South Wales, Australia

Playing information
- Position: Centre, Halfback, Five-eighth
Club
Years	Team	Pld	T	G	FG	P
1926–29	St. George	39	11	81	0	195

Leonard Herbert Guest (1908–1965) was an Australian rugby league player who played in the 1920s.

== Background ==
Guest was born in Narrandera, New South Wales and then lived at Kingsgrove, New South Wales before signing with St George.

== Playing career ==
Guest played four seasons with St. George between 1926 and 1929. He played centre in the first St. George grand final team of 1927. Guest was a prolific goal kicker and was the club's top point scorer in 1928 and 1929. He scored nearly two hundred points for St. George during his four years at the club.

== Death ==
Guest died on 22 October 1965, aged 57.
