= Gordon Fletcher =

Australian rugby league footballer

Personal information
- Full name: Gordon Thomas Fletcher
- Born: 14 February 1908 Parkes, New South Wales, Australia
- Died: 3 September 1987 (aged 79)

Playing information
- Position: Five-eighth, Halfback, Centre
Club
| Years | Team | Pld | T | G | FG | P |
|---|---|---|---|---|---|---|
| 1928–32 | Eastern Suburbs | 39 | 5 | 0 | 0 | 15 |
| 1934 | North Sydney | 5 | 1 | 0 | 0 | 3 |
| | Total | 44 | 6 | 0 | 0 | 18 |
Representative
| Years | Team | Pld | T | G | FG | P |
| 1928 | New South Wales | 4 | 1 | 0 | 0 | 3 |
- Source: As of 21 June 2019

Gordon Fletcher was an Australian rugby league footballer who played in the 1930s. He played for Eastern Suburbs and North Sydney in the NSWRL competition.

== Background ==
Fletcher played in the local country competitions before joining Eastern Suburbs. He played representative football for Western NSW and Far Western NSW in 1927 and 1928.

== Playing career ==
Fletcher made his first grade debut for Eastern Suburbs in Round 1 1928 against University at the Royal Agricultural Society Grounds. Eastern Suburbs finished 2nd on the table that year and eventually reached the grand final against arch rivals South Sydney who were looking at winning their 4th premiership in a row.

Fletcher played at five-eighth in the match as Easts were comprehensively beaten 26–5 in the final played at the Royal Agricultural Society Grounds. Fletcher was also selected to play for New South Wales in 1928 and featured in 4 games.

Fletcher played with Easts up until the end of 1932 before departing the club. Due to the residency rules at the time, Fletcher sat out the 1933 season before signing with North Sydney for the 1934 season. Fletcher only managed to play 5 games with Norths before retiring.
