= David Watson (1920s rugby league) =

Australian RL coach and former rugby league footballer

Dave Watson
Personal information
- Full name: David William Watson
- Born: 25 March 1900 Waterloo, New South Wales, Australia
- Died: 21 December 1982 (aged 82) Sydney, New South Wales, Australia

Playing information
- Position: Second-row, Lock
Club
Years	Team	Pld	T	G	FG	P
1923–31	South Sydney	82	9	1	0	29
Representative
Years	Team	Pld	T	G	FG	P
1929	New South Wales	4	1	0	0	3
1923	Metropolis	1	0	0	0	0

Coaching information
Club
Years	Team	Gms	W	D	L	W%
1935–36	South Sydney	29	16	0	13	55
1947–49	South Sydney	54	29	2	23	54
	Total	83	45	2	36	54

David 'Dave' Watson (1900–1982) was an Australian rugby league footballer who played in the 1920s and 1930s. He was a multi premiership winner with South Sydney, and later a coach of the club.

== Playing career ==
Dave Watson, was a legendary South Sydney player from their golden era of the late 1920s. He played 9 seasons for South Sydney between 1923 and 1931, playing a total of 153 grade games for Souths during his long career. Dave Watson played in six grand finals for Souths between 1923–29 and won four premierships with them in 1926, 1927, 1928 and 1929. He was also selected to play for New South Wales on 2 occasions in 1929.

== Coaching career ==
He also coached South Sydney from 1935 to 1936, and from 1947 to 1949. He later went on to work for Souths and a Selector and committeeman, and later as a state and Kangaroo selector for the NSWRFL. As a national selector, Watson famously did not vote for Bob McCarthy to be selected on the 1967–68 Kangaroo Tour, after McCarthy had a stellar season – a grudge that Bob McCarthy still carries to this day.

The South Sydney website states that Dave Watson was awarded Life Membership of the Rabbitohs in 1962, and that he died in 1982 aged 82
