= Mick O'Connor (rugby league) =

Australian rugby league footballer (1903–1980)

Personal information
- Full name: Michael Joseph O'Connor
- Born: 25 May 1903
- Died: 16 August 1980 (aged 77)

Playing information
- Position: Halfback, Five-eighth
Club
Years	Team	Pld	T	G	FG	P
1927–28	South Sydney	16	0	0	0	0

Michael Joseph O'Connor (25 May 1903 – 16 August 1980) was an Australian rugby league footballer.

A diminutive halfback, O'Connor was a local Kensington junior and had two seasons of first–grade with South Sydney, making 16 appearances. He was a five–eighth in their 1927 premiership team and usually had team captain Alf Blair as his halves partner. His 1927 season also included selection to a Sydney Metropolis II squad.

O'Connor later had a three–season stint in Queensland, where he played for rural club Longreach, before making his way to North Tamworth as their new coach in 1933.
