= George Clamback =

Australian rugby league footballer and administrator

Personal information
- Full name: George Henry Ford or Clamback
- Born: James Henry Claude Ford; 30 June 1894; Newtown, New South Wales, Australia
- Died: 25 October 1982 (aged 88)

Playing information
- Position: Prop, Lock
Club
Years	Team	Pld	T	G	FG	P
1918–21	Newtown	47	8	0	0	24
1922	Eastern Suburbs	13	4	0	0	12
1923–24	Newtown	16	2	0	0	6
1927	Eastern Suburbs	15	2	0	0	6
	Total	91	16	0	0	48

Refereeing information
Years	Competition	Apps
1932	NSWRFL	5

George Henry Clamback (30 June 1894 – 25 October 1982) was an Australian rugby league footballer who played in the 1920s, was a referee in the 1930s, and was later a club administrator. Clamback played as a forward for Newtown and Eastern Suburbs.

== Early life ==
Born as James Henry Claude Ford, he later assumed the name George Henry Ford. During his rugby league career, he was known by his stepfather's surname, Clamback.

== Rugby league career ==
Prior to joining Newtown's third-grade team in 1914, Clamback played for Stanmore Wentworths in the Annandale junior competition. He made his first-grade debut for Newtown in 1918.

Clamback played six first-grade seasons with Newtown, and two with Eastern Suburbs.

In 1927, while playing for Easts during their round 17 match against Balmain, Clamback's lower jaw was fractured by a punch from an opposing player. Balmain's Bill Maizey was charged with assault in relation to the incident; he was acquitted by a jury. This would prove to be Clamback's final match in first-grade.

Having previously refereed junior matches in the Newtown district, Clamback opted to pursue grade refereeing in 1928.

In the 1940s, Clamback was president and selector for the Newtown Rugby League Club.

== Personal life ==
In 1934, Clamback suffered two fractured vertebrae in his neck after diving into shallow water at Patonga Beach. He was treated at Hornsby Hospital.
