= Charles Kell =

Australian rugby league footballer

- Charles 'Chicka' Kell 1923

Personal information
- Full name: Charles Joseph Kell
- Born: 12 April 1905 Ashfield, New South Wales, Australia
- Died: 28 September 1964 (aged 59) Earlwood, New South Wales, Australia

Playing information
- Position: Halfback
Club
Years	Team	Pld	T	G	FG	P
1920–1928	Newtown	85	14	3	0	48

Charles Joseph Kell (1905–1964) was an Australian rugby league player who played in the 1920s.

== Playing career ==
Charles 'Chick' Kell was a Newtown half-back that played nine season for the club between 1920 and 1928. 'Chick' Kell began his long career at the Camperdown Dragons junior club and made his way into grade in 1919.

In 1927, a press report described him as "Newtown's longest serving player even though he only in his mid twenties". He was also described, along with South Sydney halfback 'Micky' O'Connor, as "the smallest player in first grade league football." After captaining the Newtown club on numerous occasions during his long career, 'Chick' Kell retired after the 1928 season due to injuries.

Charles 'Chicka' Kell died on 28 September 1964, aged 59.
