= Frank Saunders (rugby league) =

Australian rugby league footballer

- Frank Saunders. 1927 First Grade

Personal information
- Full name: Frank Fuller Saunders
- Born: 11 November 1902 Rockdale, New South Wales, Australia
- Died: 19 July 1978 (aged 75) Carlton, New South Wales, Australia

Playing information
- Position: Wing, Centre
Club
Years	Team	Pld	T	G	FG	P
1923–29	St. George	75	50	20	0	190
Representative
Years	Team	Pld	T	G	FG	P
1924–25	New South Wales	2	0	0	0	0
1923	Metropolis	1	2	2	0	10

Frank Fuller Saunders (1902–1978) was an Australian rugby league player who played in the 1920s.

== Background ==
Saunders was born in Rockdale, New South Wales on 11 November 1902.

== Playing career ==
Frank 'Fatty' Saunders played with St. George during the clubs' foundation years. He played seven seasons with Saints between 1923 and 1929 including St. George's first grand final in 1927. Saunders also represented N.S.W. on two occasions in 1924–1925.

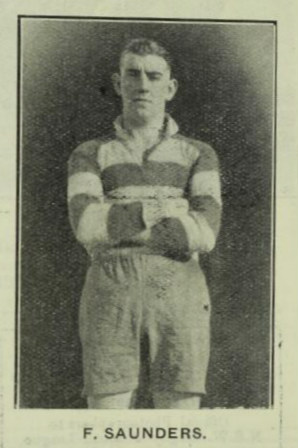
Frank Saunders. Centre 1927 Grand Final

== Post playing ==
After his retirement from football, he was a committeeman and loyal servant of the St. George club for most of his life.

== Death ==
Saunders died from cancer on 19 July 1978.
