= Aub Kelly =

Australian rugby league footballer and coach

- Aub 'Jockey' Kelly. 1927

Personal information
- Full name: Aubrey Jean Kelly
- Born: 15 June 1904 Neutral Bay, New South Wales, Australia
- Died: 17 September 1974 (aged 70) Brisbane, Queensland, Australia

Playing information
- Position: Lock
Club
| Years | Team | Pld | T | G | FG | P |
|---|---|---|---|---|---|---|
| 1924–29 | St George | 52 | 13 | 1 | 0 | 41 |
Representative
| Years | Team | Pld | T | G | FG | P |
| 1926–27 | New South Wales | 9 | 2 | 0 | 0 | 6 |
- Source: Whiticker/Hudson

Aubrey Jean Aitkenhead 'Aub' Kelly (1904–1974) was an Australian rugby league player who played in the 1920s.

Born in Neutral Bay, New South Wales in 1904, Aub 'Jockey' Kelly went on to play five seasons with St George between 1924 and 1929. A forward, he also represented New South Wales, playing 9 games between 1926 and 1927. He retired from Sydney to captain-coach Young in 1930–1931, before marrying a Queensland woman in 1932 and moving to Blackall, Queensland.

Kelly died on 17 September 1974, in Queensland aged 70.
