= Harry Kavanagh (rugby league) =

Australian rugby league footballer

Personal information
- Full name: Harry Kavanagh

Playing information
- Position: Second-row, Prop, Lock
Club
Years	Team	Pld	T	G	FG	P
1925–29	Eastern Suburbs	36	15	0	0	45
Representative
Years	Team	Pld	T	G	FG	P
1928	NSW City	1	0	0	0	0
- Source: As of 26 March 2019

Harry Kavanagh was an Australian rugby league footballer who played in the 1920s. He played for Eastern Suburbs in the NSWRL competition.

== Playing career ==
Kavanagh made his first grade debut for Eastern Suburbs in Round 10 1925 against Balmain at the Sydney Sports Ground. Eastern Suburbs would go on to finish second last in 1925 only 2 years after winning the premiership in 1923. The club only avoided the wooden spoon on for and against.

In 1928, Kavanagh was part of the Easts side which claimed the minor premiership and reached the grand final against Souths who were looking for their 4th premiership in a row. Kavanagh played at second-row as Easts were comprehensively beaten 26–5 in the final which was played at the Royal Agricultural Society Grounds in front of 25,000 people.

Kavanagh played on in 1929 before retiring at the end of the season.
