= Sid Harris =

Australian rugby league player

Personal information
- Full name: Sidney Raymond Harris
- Born: 5 August 1906; Sydney, New South Wales, Australia
- Died: 30 September 1965 (aged 59); Sydney, New South Wales, Australia

Playing information
- Position: Centre, Wing, Lock
Club
Years	Team	Pld	T	G	FG	P
1926–34	South Sydney	66	27	0	0	0
Representative
Years	Team	Pld	T	G	FG	P
1926–32	New South Wales	2	0	0	0	0
1926	Metropolis	1	0	0	0	0

Sid Harris (1906-1965) was an Australian rugby league footballer who played in the 1920s and 1930s. He played for South Sydney in the NSWRL competition during the club's first golden era where Souths won 7 premierships in 8 seasons.

== Background ==
Harris played his junior rugby league for Bloomfield Waratahs before being signed by South Sydney. He also played representative football for South Coast between 1923 and 1924.

== Playing career ==
Harris made his first grade debut for South Sydney in Round 1 1926 against St George at the Sydney Cricket Ground. Harris made 8 appearances in the 1926 season but missed out on playing in the club's premiership victory over University in the grand final.

In 1927, Harris played 16 games for Souths and scored 13 tries. Harris played in the 1927 NSWRL grand final victory over St George which was the club's third straight premiership.

Harris and Souths' teammate Alby Carr moved to England in 1927 and signed with Huddersfield. They returned to Australia two years later.

Harris then returned to Australia and played in the country rugby league competitions with Cootamundra and Burrawa.

In 1931, Harris rejoined South Sydney but did not play in the club's premiership victories of 1931 or 1932. In 1933, Harris captained the side at times as Souths finished short of another grand final appearance. In 1934, Harris played 13 games as Souths reached the preliminary final against arch rivals Eastern Suburbs. Souths lost the match 19–6. The game was also the players last in first grade. In total, Harris played 78 games for Souths across all grades.

At representative level, Harris played for New South Wales and Metropolis.

== Death ==
Harris was killed in a car accident in 1965.
