= George Carstairs (rugby league) =

Australian rugby league footballer (1900-1966)

Personal information
- Full name: George James Brian Carstairs
- Born: 25 March 1900 Rozelle, New South Wales, Australia
- Died: 14 October 1966 (aged 66) Concord, New South Wales, Australia

Playing information
- Position: Centre
Club
Years	Team	Pld	T	G	FG	P
1921–29	St. George	81	11	79	0	191
Representative
Years	Team	Pld	T	G	FG	P
1921–22	Australia	2	0	0	0	0
1922–24	New South Wales	2	0	0	0	0
1922–23	Metropolis	2	1	2	0	7
- Military career
- Allegiance: Australia
- Branch: Australian Army
- Service years: 1917-1918; 1940-1943
- Unit: First Australian Imperial Force
- Conflicts: World War I; Western Front; World War II; Middle East

George James Carstairs (1900–1966) was an Australian rugby league player who played in the 1920s and represented Australia.

Carstairs circled with the 1921-22 Kangaroos .

== Career ==
Born to parents George and Adeline Carstairs on 25 March 1900, George "Bluey" Carstairs went on to become a legendary figure at St. George club. He learned the game of rugby league at Kogarah Marist Brothers, where he attended as a student. He made his first grade début in St George's foundation year in 1921, and went on to play his whole career at the club between 1921 and 1929. He had scored the first try in St. George's first competition match on 23 April 1921, in a game that saw Glebe defeat St. George 4–3. At years end, he was selected to play on the 1921–22 Kangaroo tour of Great Britain, thus making Carstairs St. George's first international player. He is listed on the Australian Players Register as Kangaroo No. 123. He played in the 2nd and 3rd test matches on that tour. This happened to be his last representative appearance, either for Australia or his state. A loyal clubman, George Carstairs was involved in the massive controversy surrounding the Earl Park Riot, a 1928 match involving St George and Balmain that turned into an all in brawl with players and spectators alike. Carstairs retired at the end of the 1929 season.

== War service ==
George Carstairs served in both world wars. He enlisted in the AIF in January 1917, claiming he was 18 years of age, whilst being only 16. He sailed out with the 1st Battalion/24 Reinforcements on 17 February 1917 to see action in France, and returned to Australia in 1919 at war's end.

He also enlisted in the Australian Army during World War II in 1940, aged 40, and saw action in the Middle East before a war related injury forced his discharge in 1943.

George Carstairs died from complications due to old war injuries at the Concord Repatriation Hospital on 14 October 1966, aged 66.
