= Harry Cavanough =

Australian rugby league footballer

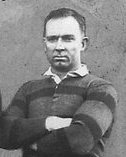

Personal information
- Full name: Henry Roy Cavanough
- Born: 25 January 1898
- Died: 10 January 1966 (aged 67); Panania, New South Wales

Playing information
- Position: Second-row, Lock, Hooker
Club
Years	Team	Pld	T	G	FG	P
1921–24	Newtown	36	8	0	0	24
1925–28	South Sydney	50	13	0	0	39
	Total	86	21	0	0	63
Representative
Years	Team	Pld	T	G	FG	P
1926–28	New South Wales	23	0	1	0	3

Harry Cavanough (1898–1966) was an Australian rugby league footballer who played in the 1920s. He was a multi premiership winner with South Sydney Rabbitohs and he also played for Newtown in the NSWRL competition.

== Playing career ==
Cavanough made his first grade debut for Newtown in 1921 against Balmain. Cavanough's time at Newtown was not a successful one as the club spent most of the time near the bottom of the ladder.

In 1925, Cavanough joined South Sydney and in 1926 was a member of the premiership winning team defeating University in the grand final. Cavanough went on to win two further premierships with Souths in consecutive years against St George and arch rivals Eastern Suburbs as the club went through a golden era in the 1920s winning a total of 5 premierships.

Cavanough retired at the end of the 1928 season. He also represented New South Wales on 23 occasions between 1926 and 1928.

Harry Cavanough died on 10 Jan 1966.
