= Alf Blair =

Australian RL coach and former Australia international rugby league footballer

Personal information
- Full name: Alfred Lewis Blair
- Born: 23 January 1896
- Died: 28 September 1944 (aged 48); Coogee, New South Wales

Playing information
- Position: Five-eighth
Club
Years	Team	Pld	T	G	FG	P
1917–30	South Sydney	167	37	120	0	351
Representative
Years	Team	Pld	T	G	FG	P
1919–27	New South Wales	15	6	6	0	30
1924	Australia	1	0	0	0	0

Coaching information
Club
Years	Team	Gms	W	D	L	W%
1927	South Sydney	16	14	0	2	88
1931	Waratah Mayfield
1943	Western Suburbs	14	3	0	11	21
1944	South Sydney	14	7	1	6	50
	Total	44	24	1	19	55

Alfred Lewis "Smacker" Blair (23 January 1896 – 28 September 1944) was an Australian rugby league footballer and coach whose playing career ran from 1917 to 1930 with South Sydney. A skilled five-eighth, he made a single appearance for the Australian national team in 1924.

== Club career ==
Blair played his club football career with South Sydney, whom he captained to premiership victories in 1925 (undefeated), 1926, 1927 and 1929. He was the 1927 NSWRFL season's top point scorer and was captain-coach of the South Sydney club that year. He took a year off from Sydney football in 1928 when he traveled to Queensland to captain-coach Longreach. He returned to Souths for his final playing year in 1929, winning a premiership and leading the side on the first tour of New Zealand by a Sydney club team.

After finishing his Sydney career with Souths, he captain-coached the Waratah-Mayfield club in Newcastle in 1931. He finished his career at Cooma before returning to Sydney.

Blair played 167 first grade games for the South Sydney club between 1917 and 1930 scoring 37 tries and 120 goals for a total of 351 points. The noted journalist Claude Corbett said of him, "He was beyond doubt the finest rugby league captain Sydney club football has ever known. He had an uncanny intuition of positional play."

== Representative career ==
Blair played seven games for the New South Wales rugby league team in 1919 and 1927. He also played one test match for Australia against the touring Great Britain team in 1924. He is listed on the Australian Players Register as Kangaroo No. 128.

== Post-playing ==
Blair coached Western Suburbs for the 1943 NSWRFL season, after which he was succeeded by Henry Bolewski. He then coached South Sydney for the 1944 NSWRFL season.

Blair had just completed the season coaching his old club when he died suddenly at his Coogee home on 28 September 1944. Up until his death, he was a popular steward at the NSW Leagues Club, and became ill at work a few days before he died. He was survived by his son, Alf. A large funeral was held for Smacker at St. Brigid's Church, Coogee where many past and present members of the South Sydney District Rugby League Football club were present. He was buried at Botany Cemetery on 30 September 1944.

== Sources ==
- Andrews, Malcolm. The ABC of Rugby League. Australia: ABC Books, 2006.
- Whiticker, Alan & Hudson, Glen (2006) The Encyclopedia of Rugby League Players, Gavin Allen Publishing, Sydney
- Whiticker, Alan & Collis, Ian (2006) The History of Rugby League Clubs, New Holland, Sydney
