= Charlie Lynch =

Australian rugby league coach

Personal information
- Full name: Charles Lynch
- Born: 5 June 1891; Parramatta, New South Wales, Australia
- Died: 21 August 1968 (aged 77); Narwee, New South Wales, Australia

Coaching information
Club
| Years | Team | Gms | W | D | L | W% |
| 1928–40 | South Sydney | 165 | 107 | 6 | 52 | 65 |
| 1947 | St. George | 16 | 9 | 0 | 7 | 56 |
| | Total | 181 | 116 | 6 | 59 | 64 |
- Source: As of 17 June 2019

Charlie Lynch (1891-1968) was an Australian rugby league coach of the 1920s and 1940s. He is known as a multi-premiership-winning coach.

== South Sydney ==
Lynch is mainly remembered as a premiership winning coach of the South Sydney club. A prodigy of the great Arthur Hennessey, Lynch took over from Alf Blair as the first grade coach in 1928, and coached to the club for 11 seasons between 1928-1934 and 1937–1940. He won a premiership in his debut year as a first grade coach in 1928, and also tasted premiership success in 1929, 1931 and 1932. After many years at the helm of South Sydney, he retired from coaching at the conclusion of the 1940 season.

== St. George ==
As a resident of Carlton, New South Wales, he began an association with St. George, and stepped in as their first grade coach in 1947 replacing Herb Narvo from the previous year. Although Lynch was popular with players and members, the St. George club missed the finals in 1947, and Charlie Lynch was not retained by the club as coach for the 1948 season.

== Accolades ==
Lynch was awarded Life Membership of the South Sydney Rabbitohs in 1967, and he died the following year.
