= Earl Park, Arncliffe =

Sports field in New South Wales, Australia

Earl Park
- Interactive map of Earl Park
- Location: Arncliffe, New South Wales
- Coordinates: 33.933477°S 151.147621°E
- Surface: Grass

Tenant
- St George Dragons (NSWRL) (1925–1939)

Earl Park is a former sports field in the Sydney suburb of Arncliffe. From 1925 to 1939 it was the site of New South Wales Rugby Football League Premiership club, St. George's home ground and headquarters. The ground was provided by a club benefactor named Lancelot Lewis Earl (1862–1938). Lancelot Earl owned and lived on the Earl Park estate until his death in 1938. The estate was sold in 1940 and a factory was built on the site.

== St. George ==
The St George Dragons played their home games at Earl Park from 1925 until 1939 in the New South Wales Rugby Football League Premiership. Earl Park was situated opposite the Arncliffe Railway Station, and was built on the site that one was a flourishing market garden. It transformed into one of the finest rugby league grounds in Sydney. The oval itself measured 175 feet by 150 feet. There was a new grandstand that could seat 1100 spectators, and the ground could easily accommodate 10,000 people. The dressing rooms were the largest in Sydney, at the time measuring 120 feet by 30 ft.

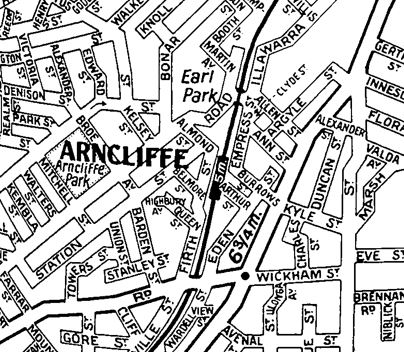
Earl Park 1934

== First game ==
Earl Park was completed and opened for the first time on 16 May 1925. St.George played Western Suburbs Magpies. The game was designated a 'testimonial' with the club giving its share of the gate to the recently retired champion player Herb Gilbert in recognition of his services rendered as a player and coach. The St.George Dragons defeated Western Suburbs 6–5.

The club set the League records for the highest scoring match, largest winning margin, and most points scored by a team in a match at the ground when they won 91–6 against neighbouring club Canterbury-Bankstown on 11 May 1935. During that game Les Griffin set two other records for the club: most points in a match (36) and most goals in a match (15). For the 1940 NSWRFL season, St. George left Earl Park, moving back to Hurstville Oval.

== Earl Park Riot ==
Earl Park was the site of the Earl Park Riot. On 11 August 1928, St. George played their Round 11 match of the 1928 NSWRFL season against Balmain at the ground in front of about 6,000 fans, with most supporting the home team St George. Saints won a spiteful match 21–3 as referee Mick Brannaghan lost control of the match in the second half. Brannaghan sent off St. George forward Harry Flower but did not take similar action when it came to the reported thuggery being dished out by the Balmain players. Saints' player George Carstairs was kicked in the face while he attempted to play the ball, and five minutes from time was knocked unconscious after being kicked in the head by Balmain forward Tony Russell. Brannaghan only cautioned Russell, and, after Balmain's earlier violent tactics, the Earl Park crowd was infuriated. The incident prompted Saints' coach Frank Burge, and secretary Reg Fusedale, to enter the playing field to talk to Brannaghan.

However, it was the actions of Balmain's George Bishop at full-time that pushed the crowd over the edge. Bishop began chasing Saints' Arnold Traynor, attempting to settle a score, which prompted the crowd to invade the field, many of whom ripped wooden pickets from the fence surrounding the oval to assault the Balmain players while screaming "We want Russell", with reports from future St George official Alex Mackie that one man was seen running behind the grandstand swinging an axe. The Police had attempted to restore order, moving through the mob with batons and handcuffs swinging. One man, who was arrested for brawling and handcuffed to a goalpost, was promptly forgotten about by the Police for three hours. The police couldn't stop Russell from being badly beaten by the crowd, and he had to be taken away in an ambulance suffering head and leg injuries.

Russell was eventually moved to safety and then bundled into an ambulance, but hostilities continued as he found he was in the same van as George Carstairs. Only the quick intervention of the ambulancemen prevented Russell from lunging at the St George player as the vehicle travelled to St George Hospital, with Russell snarling at Carstairs "You started this you bastard, now I'm going to finish it".

The police were eventually able to restore order, but the day will be remembered as a black day in the history of the New South Wales Rugby League. Following the riot, the NSWRL launched an official investigation and concluded that the crowd, rather than the players or referee Brannaghan, were to blame for the riot.

In an interview more than 40 years after the riot, Tony Russell claimed that it was actually George Carstairs who started it by elbowing him in the face and breaking his nose. Russell also strenuously denied kicking "Bluey" Carstairs, declaring, "I wouldn't have wasted the boot leather".

== The end of an era ==
When Lancelot Earl died on 20 June 1938, the ground was put on the open market after being offered to St. George and the NSWRFL for 5,000 pounds. As neither party was in a position to purchase the property, it was eventually sold to Cook's Caramels who constructed a factory on the site. The last match ever to be played at Earl Park was against North Sydney on Saturday 8 July 1939. St. George won the game 24–17.

Earl Park was situated on the block that is surrounded by Bonar Street, Wollongong Road, Martin Avenue, and Bidjigal Road, and nothing of it remains there.
