= Benny Wearing =

Australian rugby league footballer (1901–1968)

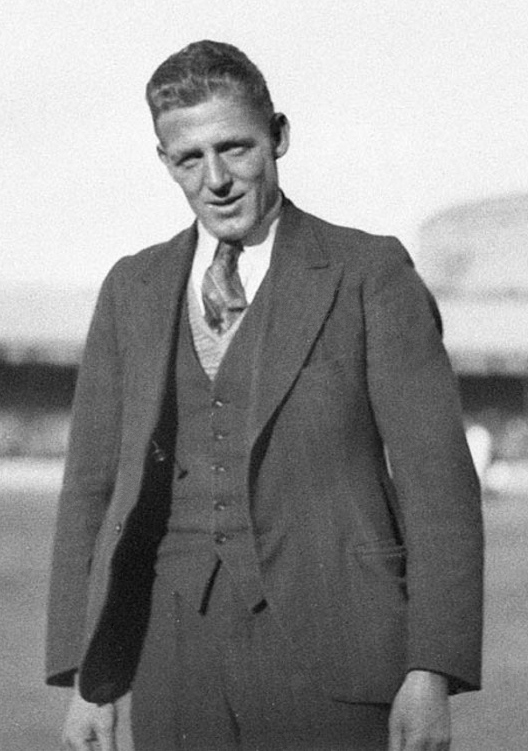

Personal information
- Full name: Benjamin Wearing
- Born: 11 June 1901 Redfern, New South Wales
- Died: 9 April 1968 (aged 66) Maroubra, New South Wales

Playing information
- Position: Wing
Club
Years	Team	Pld	T	G	FG	P
1921–33	South Sydney	172	144	202	0	836
Representative
Years	Team	Pld	T	G	FG	P
1923–32	New South Wales	23	17	37	0	125
1928	Australia	1	2	3	0	12
1928–30	NSW City	2	2	7	0	20
1927	Metropolis	1	2	0	0	6

Benny Wearing (11 June 1901 – 9 April 1968) was an Australian rugby league footballer who played in the 1920s and 1930s. An Australian international and New South Wales representative three-quarter, he played his club football in the NSWRFL Premiership for South Sydney. Wearing was the third player in Australian rugby league history to score 100 premiership tries.

== Playing career ==
Wearing was a prodigious try-scoring wing three-quarter and scored all of Souths' 12 points in their grand final loss in 1923. He then went on to play a major part in South Sydney's 7 premiership victories between 1925 and 1932.

For the seasons 1925 and 1928 he was the NSW Rugby League's top point scorer and in three consecutive seasons from 1926 to 1928 he was the League's top try scorer, a feat only ever achieved by two other players – Gordon Wright in the 1920s and Nathan Blacklock 1999 to 2001.

Having been representing New South Wales since 1924, Wearing debuted for Australia in the 3rd dead rubber Test of 1928 against the touring British Lions side. He scored two tries and kicked three goals to help Australia to a 21 to 14 victory at the Sydney Cricket Ground. Despite that contribution and good club form in 1929, he was overlooked by selectors for the 1929–30 Kangaroo tour of Great Britain. Wearing is listed on the Australian Players Register as Kangaroo No. 150.

Wearing retired having played 173 first grade games for Souths between 1921 and 1933 which stood as the club record till Jack Rayner eclipsed it in the late 1950s. He scored 836 points for the Rabbitohs (144 tries and 202 goals) which stood as the club record for several decades. His 144 career tries for the Rabbitohs stood as the club record for over eight decades until it was broken in 2014 by Nathan Merritt when he scored his 145th try in an 18–2 victory over the Penrith Panthers.

== Accolades ==
In February 2008, Wearing was named in the list of Australia's 100 Greatest Players (1908–2007) which was commissioned by the NRL and ARL to celebrate the code's centenary year in Australia.
