= 1908 Eastern Suburbs season =

- 1908 NSWRFL season Rank: 2
- Play-off result: Won
- 1908 record: Wins: 9; draws: 0; losses: 2
- Points scored: For: 218; against: 114

Team information
- Captain: Harry Flegg
- Stadium: Royal Agricultural Society Showground

Top scorers
- Tries: Horrie Miller(15)
- Goals: Herb Brackenreg(17)
- Points: Horrie Miller(47)
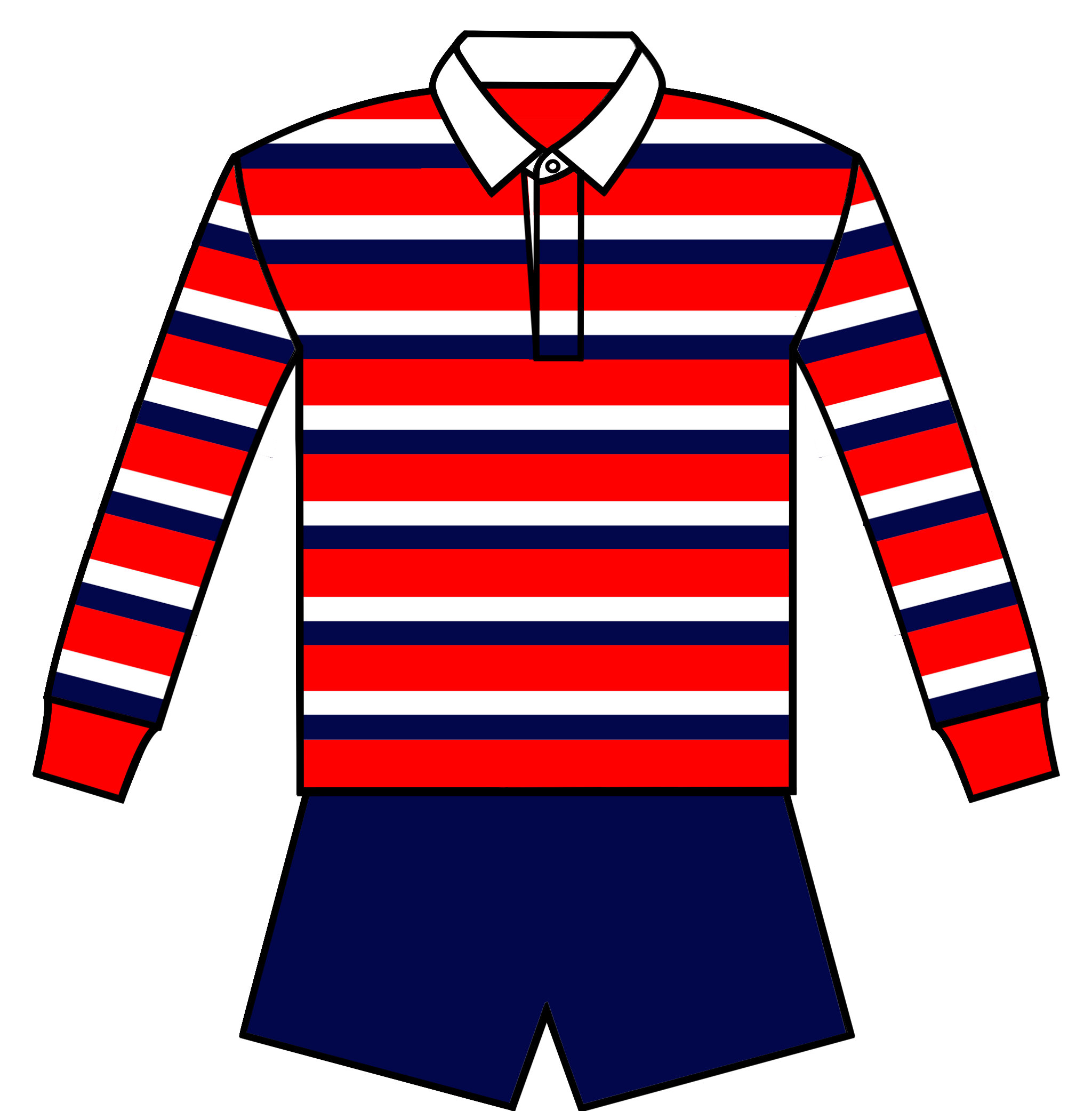
Home colours
1909 →

The 1908 season was the first in the history of the Eastern Suburbs District Rugby League Football Club (now known as the Sydney Roosters). Eastern Suburbs competed in the inaugural match of the inaugural season, of the newly formed New South Wales Rugby Football League, reaching the final which they lost to South Sydney. They have the distinction of being the only club to have competed in every season since that time.

== The early years ==
The Eastern Suburbs District Rugby League Football club was founded at a meeting held at the Paddington Town Hall on 24 January 1908. The meeting was chaired by Harry 'Jersey' Flegg who was named Easts first Secretary and a delegate to the NSWRL. Flegg was also appointed as the club's first captain and made a team selector. Legendary cricketer of the time Victor Trumper was appointed to Easts first committee, while Lieutenant-Colonel Onslow was made Patron of the Eastern Suburbs club.

At a subsequent meeting held on 7 February John White was appointed as the club's first President while R. Carty was named treasurer. Horrie Miller replaced Flegg as secretary and became the second of Easts two delegates to the NSWRL.

== Players ==
No.

Position
Player

1 Harry 'Jersey' Flegg – PR (c) 2 Herb Brackenreg – PR 3 David Brown – CE 4 Lou D'Alpuget – HB 5 Dan Frawley – WG 6 Fred Fry – FB 7 Lou 'Baby' Jones – SR 8 Bob Mable – LK 9 Larry 'Jersey' O'Malley – SR 10 Sid 'Sandy' Pearce – HK 11 Albert Rosenfeld – FE 12 William Smith – WG 13 Johnno Stuntz – WG

No.

Position
Player

14 Horrie Miller – WG 15 Percy McNamara – FB 16 Harry Thomson – SR 17 Harold Kelley – FE 18 Herbert Henry 'Dally' Messenger – CE 19 Herbert Woodhill – FB 20 George Green – HK 21 Alfred Playfair – SR 22 Joe Shakespeare – SR 23 Percy White – PR 24 William Leslie – SR 25 Mick Frawley – PR 26 Bill King – FB 27 Ted Briscoe – SR

== Inaugural season ==
=== Result by round ===
Round	1	2	3	4	5	6	7	8	9	10
Ground	Ww	-	A	A	A	A	A	Ww	A	A
Result	W	B	W	W	W	W	W	L	W	W
Points	2	4	6	8	10	12	12	14	16	18

Source: Rugby League Tables / Season 1908
A = Agricultural; B = Bye; W = Win; D = Draw; L = Loss; Ww = Wentworth
- Premiership Round 1 - The opening match of the New South Wales Rugby Football League premiership consisted of two double headers. The match involving Eastern Suburbs was played on 20 April 1908, (the Easter weekend) at Sydney's Wentworth Park ground against the Newtown club. Admittance was sixpence, and for an additional sixpence, one could sit in the grandstand.

The line-ups that day were:

- Eastern Suburbs: Fred Fry; Johnno Stuntz, William Smith (who was replaced by Horrie Miller after he injured his shoulder during the match), Dave Brown, Dan Frawley; Albert Rosenfeld, Lou D'Alpuget; Bob Mable, Larry O'Malley, Lou Jones, Herb Brackenreg, Sandy Pearce, and Jersey Flegg(c).

Newtown three-quarter Jack Scott had the honour of scoring the first ever try in the New South Wales Rugby League premiership when he took an intercept early in the match. As for Eastern Suburbs, William Smith had the honour of scoring the first ever try in first grade. It was the only try he ever scored for the club. The try was converted by Lou D'Alpuget and ironically this was also the only goal he ever kicked for Easts while Johnno Stuntz's 4 tries remains the most tries scored on debut in 1st grade.

Eastern Suburbs 32 (Stuntz 4, Miller, Brown, Smith, D'Alpuget tries; Jones 2, D'Alpuget goals, Miller field goal) defeated Newtown 16

Newspaper reports of the match were enthusiastic with one journalist describing the match as, "A capital display considering that the contestants have as yet only a fair acquaintance with the rules." Another, The Sydney Mail described it as "The best game of the day".

- Premiership Round 2 BYE
- Premiership Round 3–16 May 1908 at the Agricultural Ground. Crowd 2000.

Eastern Suburbs 13 (Miller 2, Pearce Tries; Brackenreg 2 Goals) defeated South Sydney 12 (4 Tries).

This has always been one of the rugby leagues fiercest rivalries, between the only two remaining foundation clubs - It was no different in that very first encounter.

- Premiership Round 4–23 May 1908 at the Agricultural Ground. Crowd 1500.

Eastern Suburbs 21 (Miller, Pearce, Jones, O'Malley, Flegg tries; Jones 3 goals) defeated Balmain 8 (2 tries; 1 goal)

- Premiership Round 5–30 May 1908 at the Agricultural Ground. Crowd 800.

Eastern Suburbs 9 (Miller 2, Brown tries) defeated Western Suburbs 8 (2 tries; 1 goal)

- Premiership Round 6–20 June 1908 at the Agricultural Ground. Crowd 1500.

Eastern Suburbs 19 (Dan Frawley 2, Miller, O'Malley, Rosenfeld tries; Messenger 2 goals) defeated North Sydney 11 (3 tries; 1 goal)

- Premiership Round 7–27 June 1908 at the Agricultural Ground. Crowd 4000.

Eastern Suburbs 26 (Dan Frawley 2, Miller, Brackenreg, Thompson, Rosenfeld tries; Brackenreg 4 goals) defeated Cumberland 5 (1 try; 1 goal)

- Premiership Round 8–4 July 1908 at the Wentworth Ground. Crowd 1200.

Eastern Suburbs 5 (Jones try; Brackenreg goal) lost to Glebe 11 (3 tries; 1 goal)

- Premiership Round 9–25 July 1908 at the Agricultural Ground. Crowd 400.

Eastern Suburbs 34 (Miller 2, Messenger 2, Brackenreg, Dan Frawley tries; Messenger 6, Brackenreg 2 goals) defeated Newcastle 17 (3 tries; 4 goals)

The game was a fast one, with tigerish work amongst the scrumragers. The Newcastle forwards held their opponents well in the scrums, but D'Alpuget, behind the Eastern pack, secured the ball oftener than Patfield, and set his backs to work well. A capital piece of passing, in which the ball went from D'Alpuget to Messenger, to Brown, to Miller, enabled the speedy three-quarter to score the first try for Eastern Suburbs. Messenger converted. The Newcastle full-back was in great form, his fielding and kicking getting his side out of some awkward corners. S. Carpenter landed a good goal for Newcastle, and then combined play by Eastern Suburbs enabled Messenger to score a try, which he also converted. Walsh, the tall Newcastle forward, was conspicuous in the open play. Patfield passed to M'Guinness close to the Eastern line, and scored a try, which S. Carpenter converted. Hot work followed, both sides being truly extended, but the Eastern Suburbs team was not to be denied. Miller obtaining possession, shot like a rocket for the line and scored a try, and a difficult goal was negotiated by Messenger. The half ended in favour of Eastern Suburbs by 17 points to 7.

The second half had not long started when a Newcastle player, Bartley, was knocked out, and had to leave the field. Bailey put in a great run for Newcastle, but his pass when he was tackled by M'Namara was overrun by his side. Jones showed prominently for Eastern Suburbs, taking the ball as far as M'Namara, but the fullback beat him for it, and got his kick in. From the centre Flegg passed to Brown to D'Alpuget to Messenger, who put in a characteristic corkscrew run, and scored a try, Brackenreg kicked the goal. Newcastle now shook things up, and had their opponents fully extended. It was hard luck that no score resulted from two of their charges, which were full of merit, but their persistence was rewarded as Cox scored two tries in rapid succession, one of which was converted by S. Carpenter. A magnificent kick by Messenger from 10 yards inside the centre line added 2 more to the Eastern Suburbs' score. It was the fifth goal the three-quarter had kicked, and Carpenter following suit for his side registered his fourth successful shot. The Newcastle team again attacked and kept the bill on the opposition line for five minutes. Their exhibition was distinctly high class. The only mistake their fullback made was in failing to pick up a rolling ball. He touched it forward, and Brackenreg beating him for possession picked up, and scored a try, which he also converted. From a try secured by Frawley Messenger kicked his sixth goal, and the whistle sounded with Eastern Suburbs in the lead by 34 points to 17.

— "LEAGUE RUGBY. EASTERN SUBURBS DEFEAT NEWCASTLE.", Sydney Morning Herald, 27 July 1908

- Premiership Round 10–8 August 1908 at the Agricultural Ground.

Eastern Suburbs 24 (Dan Frawley 3, Rosenfeld, D'Alpuget, Flegg tries: Brackenreg 2, Jones goals) defeated Western Suburbs 2 (1 goal)

== Ladder ==
	Team	Pld	W	D	L	B	PF	PA	PD	Pts
1	South Sydney	9	8	0	1	1	194	53	+141	18
2	Eastern Suburbs	9	8	0	1	1	183	90	+93	18
3	Glebe	9	7	0	2	1	106	63	+43	16
4	North Sydney	9	6	0	3	1	155	66	+89	14
5	Newcastle	9	4	0	5	1	151	116	+35	10
6	Balmain	9	3	1	5	1	86	113	-27	9
7	Cumberland	8	1	0	7	2	38	191	-153	6
8	Newtown	9	1	1	7	1	70	148	-78	5
9	Western Suburbs	9	1	0	8	1	47	190	-143	4

== The final series ==
Premiership Semi-Final - 15 August 1908 at the Agricultural Ground.

Eastern Suburbs 23 (Miller 3, Kelley, Frawley tries; Brackenreg 4 goals) defeated North Sydney 10 (2 tries; 2 goals)

Fullback
Bill King
Three-Quarters
William Smith
Horrie Miller
Dave Brown
Percy McNamara
Halves
Lou D'Alpuget
Harold Kelley
Forwards
George Green
Harry 'Jersey' Flegg(c)
Bob Mable
Percy White
Mick Frawley
Herb Brackenreg

"Notwithstanding the departure of several leading players for England, these clubs put two good teams in the field to contest their semi final engagement. The attendance was small. There was no preliminary second grade match, and some of the second grade Eastern Suburbs' team played with the first.

The pace was very warm from the kick-off, North Sydney showing admirable defensive tactics when Eastern Suburbs attacked. All the Eastern Suburbs three-quarters moved like one man in attack, but they were beaten back. The first score however, was registered by North Sydney, M'Carthy beating several opponents with a dodgy run, and grounding the ball across the opposition line. No goal was kicked. Kelley scored a try for Eastern Suburbs, and Brackenreg kicked a goal. From an illegal tackle Eastern Suburbs had a free given against them and Glanville kicked a goal. The teams appeared to be evenly matched, although the Eastern Suburb’s scrummagers were the better. Neat passing by East enabled Miller to secure on the wing and sprint for the line. Beating all opposition he ran round, and scored behind the posts Brackenrigg added two points for a goal. Fast open play, was witnessed at this stage, Brown, for Eastern Suburbs, and M'Carthy, for North Sydney, being particularly reliable. King stopped one dangerous North Sydney rush. At half time the scores were Eastern Suburbs, 10 points, North Sydney, 5 points.

The ground improved during the afternoon under the influence of the wind and sun, but, with the exception of two or three patches was in generally good order, and the men kept their feet well. A flagrant case of shepherding cost Eastern Suburbs a try, for Green would have scored without any assistance from a club mate who warded off a rear tackler. D'Alpuget behind the Easterners scrum was very sure. He fed his five eighth well, and Brown, Brackenreg, and Miller handed passes in turn, and the last man scored a try behind the posts, Brackenreg kicked a goal. Rochester went into the three-quarter line, and made a strong run into Northern quarters but his pass was along the ground, and North Sydney were beaten back, Glanville went into the forward ranks for Norths. Hot work on the Eastern line found Albert Broomham slow in taking a pass which should have given him a good chance for a try. Ten minutes of give and take play followed. From a scramble on the Eastern line Bollard got across the line and scored a try. No goal was kicked. There was some unpleasant language occasionally, and the play became willing. Frawley played a great forward game for Eastern Suburbs, especially in the loose. Miller, taking a pass from M'Namara to Smith, scored a try. No goal was kicked. Frawley was the next to score after a passing rush, in which Smith and M'Namara were also prominent Brackenreg kicked a goal. Glanville kicked a penalty goal for North Sydney, although two of his men were off-side being attended to by the ambulance officer. At full time the scores were Eastern Suburbs, 23 points. North Sydney, 10 points."....Sydney Morning Herald.

Premiership Final - 29 August 1908 at the Agricultural Ground. Crowd was 4000.

- South Sydney 14 (4 tries; 1 goal) defeated Eastern Suburbs 12 (Miller 2 tries; Brackenreg 2 goals; McNamara field goal)

Eastern Suburbs	Position	South Sydney
Bill King	FB	Webby Neil
William Smith	WG	Frank Storie
Percy McNamara	CE	Fred Jarman
Dave Brown	CE	Ed Fry
Horrie Miller	WG	Leo Senior
Harold Kelley	FE	Arthur Conlin (c)
Lou D'Alpuget	HB	Jack Leveson
Percy White	PR	Tom Golden
Herb Brackenreg	HK	Jack Coxon
Mick Frawley	PR	Dick Green
Jersey Flegg (c)	SR	Arthur McCallum
Ted Briscoe	SR	Jack Cochrane
Bob Mable	LK	Harry Butler
	Coach	Arthur Hennessy

"The final match to determine the premiership in the first grade of the Rugby League was played on the Agricultural Society's Ground on Saturday in perfect weather. The match was shorn of much interest on account of prominent members of both teams being absent, on their way to England. In accordance with the League rules, one-third of the profits of the match will be devoted to charity. The game, which was brilliant, and at times rather rough, resulted in a victory for South Sydney by 14 points to 12. The winners deserved their victory.

South Sydney lost the toss, and kicked off from the southern end, an easterly wind blowing across the ground, and the sun shining strongly against them. Play hummed from the beginning. South Sydney having the better of matters, the forwards putting in splendid work. Getting the ball from the scrum repeatedly, South Sydney's backs executed several brilliant bursts, but the tackling of their opponents was very safe. However, they broke through once, Conlin making a beautiful feinting run, and then passing to Senior, on the wing, the latter scoring a pretty try.

Immediately afterwards Herb Brackenreg kicked a penalty goal for Eastern Suburbs. South Sydney now attacked strongly, and appeared likely to score, but Horrie Miller, intercepting a yard or so from his own line, raced the whole length of the ground and scored a beautiful try behind the posts. Brackenreg converted, making the scores 7 points to 6 in favour of Eastern Suburbs.

On resuming South Sydney obtained the upper hand, forwards and backs playing brilliantly. They made repeated dashes, but could not break through for a long time. Once Storie got across, but was tackled. Then the three-quarters made fine dashes on either wing. From the last of these, which ended on the line, Golden scored a try, which Green failed to convert. Just before half time, Edward Fry marked at Eastern Suburb’s 25, and Conlin kicked a fine goal, South Sydney leading by 8 points to 7.

The second half proved exciting from start to finish, Eastern Suburbs at first attacked and South Sydney got out of the difficulty by forcing. South Sydney now became aggressive, the three-quarters combining very neatly. They repeatedly penetrated the defence, but could not put the finishing touch to the movements for some time. At length Levison obtained a scrum and passed to Conlin, on the wing. The latter dashed for the line, and scored. The kick at goal failed. South Sydney 11 points to 7.

Eastern Suburbs put in fine work. Dan Frawley and Brackenreg dribbling almost to the line. Then McNamara dropped a field goal from centre, which reduced South Sydney's lead to 2 points. McNamara almost repeated the performance a few minutes later, South Sydney rallied, and Levison getting from a scrum at the 25 passed in to Butler, who scored. The kick at goal failed.

Play now became very rough, several players being knocked out temporarily, and the referee had to administer cautions. Near time, Eastern Suburbs came with a rush, and Miller scored a good try, which Brackenreg failed to convert.

There was no further scoring, South Sydney winning by 14 points to 12"....Sydney Morning Herald.

Semi-finals
15 August 1908 – Agricultural
Eastern Suburbs	23
North Sydney	10
15 August 1908 – Wentworth
South Sydney	16
Glebe	3

Final
29 August 1908 – Agricultural
South Sydney	14
Eastern Suburbs	12

== Pointscorers ==
Player	Tries	Goals	Field Goals	Pts Total
Horrie Miller	15	-	1	47
Herb Brackenreg	2	17	-	40
Dan Frawley	8	-	-	24
Dally Messenger	2	8	-	22
Lou Jones	2	6	-	18
Johnno Stuntz	4	-	-	12
Albert Rosenfeld	3	-	-	9
Lou D'Alpuget	2	1	-	8
Dave Brown	2	-	-	6
Sid Pearce	2	-	-	6
Larry O'Malley	2	-	-	6
Jersey Flegg	2	-	-	6
William Smith	1	-	-	3
Hugh Thompson	1	-	-	3
Harold Kelley	1	-	-	3
Mick Frawley	1	-	-	3
Percy McNamara	-	-	1	2
Total	50	32	2	218

== Season summary ==
- Eastern Suburbs finished runners up in rugby league's first premiership.
- Eastern Suburbs won the reserve grade competition.
- The Eastern Suburbs club's first try scorer was William Smith.
- The Eastern Suburbs first goal kicker was Lou D' Alpuget.
- The highest pointscorer in the NSWRL's first season was Eastern Suburbs three-quarter, Horrie Miller, with 47 points.
- Horrie Miller was also the NSWRL's highest try scorer with 15 tries.
- The first footballer, from the Eastern Suburbs club, to captain Australia was Dally Messenger.
- Eastern Suburbs players to represent Australia in that first season were:- Lou Jones, Dally Messenger, Sid Pearce, Dan Frawley, Albert Rosenfeld & Larry O'Malley.
- Eastern Suburbs players to gain selection for the 1908 Kangaroo tour were:- Dally Messenger - Larry O'Malley - Lou Jones - Dan Frawley - Albert Rosenfeld & Sid Pearce.

== Notes ==
1. Eastern Suburbs player George Green was the first Aboriginal to play in the New South Wales Rugby League.
2. Dally Messenger was selected to represent both New South Wales and Queensland in that first season.
3. Johnno Stuntz's four try effort, in the first match, remains, till this day, an (equal) Premiership record for a player in his debut match.
4. While on tour with the first Kangaroo's Dally Messenger was officially recognised with kicking a world record length, for the now archaic field goal (not to be confused with the current drop/field goal). This kick, measuring 73.2 metres, was recorded in earlier versions of the Guinness Book of World Records but has faded out over the years.
5. On the first Kangaroo Tour forward Larry O'Malley played in 35 matches, which remains as the most matches ever played on a Kangaroo tour.

Preceded by N/A	Season; 1908	Succeeded by 1909
