= 1909 Eastern Suburbs season =

← 1908	1910 →

The 1909 season was the second in which the Eastern Suburbs DRLFC competed in the New South Wales Rugby Football League competition. They finished the regular season in 4th (of 8) position, before being knocked out in the semi-final by Balmain.

== Players ==
No.

Position
Player

1 Harry 'Jersey' Flegg – PR (c) 3 Dave Brown – CE 5 Dan Frawley – WG 7 Lou Jones – PR 8 Bob Mable – PR 9 Larry 'Jersey' O'Malley – PR 10 Sid 'Sandy' Pearce – HK 11 Albert Rosenfeld – FE 13 Johnno Stuntz – WG 14 Percy McNamara – CE 15 Horrie Miller – WG 17 Harold Kelley – FE 20 George Green – PR 23 Percy White – PR 25 Mick Frawley – PR 26 Bill King – FB

No.

Position
Player

27 Ted Briscoe – PR 28 Tom Bruce – HB 29 Eddie Griffiths – PR 30 Arthur Lawes – SR 31 Arthur 'Wicker' Surridge – PR 32 Wally Webb – PR 33 Joe Oates – SR 34 Billy Flegg – SR 35 Arthur Hennessy – PR 36 George 'Babe' Hooker – SR 37 L. Brown – SR 38 Frank Foran – SR 39 Lance Abbott – WG 40 Fred Denholm – PR 41 Henry Kaufman – LK 42 Rudolf Lenton – PR

== Season ==
Round	Opponent	Result	Score	Date	Venue	Crowd
Premiership 1	Glebe Dirty Reds	Won	38 - 5	24 April	Wentworth	-
Premiership 2	Western Suburbs Magpies	Won	10 - 2	1 May	Agricultural	400
Premiership 3	North Sydney Bears	Won	26 - 16	15 May	Agricultural	
Premiership 4	South Sydney Rabbitohs	Lost	10 - 22	22 May	Agricultural	1500

- Premiership round 5, Saturday 29 May 1909.

Eastern Suburbs 18 defeated Newcastle Rebels 16 at the Newcastle Sports Ground.

Described this way "As an exhibition the game was all that could have been desired. It was fast, open, exciting and even."

Premiership 6	Newtown Jets	Won	28-5	19 June	Agricultural	800
Premiership 7	Balmain Tigers	Lost	3 - 11	26 June	Birchgrove	1500
Premiership 8	South Sydney Rabbitohs	Lost	5 - 16	10 July	Wentworth	2500

- Premiership round 9, Saturday 17 July 1909.

Balmain 24 (Apploney 2, Moore 2, Halloway, Regent Tries; Fitzpatrick 3 Goals) defeated Eastern Suburbs 15 (M. Frawley, Kelley, Webb Tries; Surridge 2, King Goals) at the Agricultural Society's Ground.

This was reported to be a particularly rough affair, Easts lost a player early in the match through injury, and two more players were severely concussed, Four were sent off for fighting, and a fifth, Easts captain Larry O'Malley was sent off for kicking.

Round	Opponent	Result	Score	Date	Venue	Crowd
Pemiership 10	North Sydney Bears	Lost	14 - 24	7 August	Agricultural	3000

== Ladder ==
	Team	Pld	W	D	L	PF	PA	PD	Pts
1	South Sydney	10	9	0	1	210	41	+169	18
2	Balmain	10	8	0	2	130	62	+68	16
3	Newcastle	10	5	0	5	144	93	+51	10
4	Eastern Suburbs	10	5	0	5	167	141	+26	10
5	Glebe	10	4	0	6	62	159	-97	8
6	Newtown	10	3	1	6	73	107	-34	7
7	North Sydney	10	2	2	6	104	157	-53	6
8	Western Suburbs	10	2	1	7	42	172	-130	5

== Semi-final ==
- Premiership Semi-final, Saturday 14 August 1909.

Balmain 15 (Walker 2, Edwards, Graves, Regent tries) defeated Eastern Suburbs 8 (Lenton, Surridge tries; King goal) at the Wentworth Park Ground in front of around 3,000 spectators.

Balmain were never in any danger of defeat, both Easts tries came late in the match with Balmain already leading by 15 points.

The lineups were-

Eastern Suburbs: Bill King • Rudolf Lenton • Henry Kaufman • Percy McNamara • Lance Abbott • Billy Flegg • Tom Bruce • Mick Frawley • Fred Denholm • Arthur Surridge • Arthur Hennessy (c) • Harold Kelley • Sid Pearce

Balmain: F. Wooley • W. Smith • A. Walker • A. Latta • A Fitzpatrick • Arthur Halloway • L. Edwards • F. Woodward • B. Graves • J. Regent (c) • F. Ward • T. McFadyen • J. Appoloney

== Point analysis ==
=== Offence ===
The lowdown: Eastern Suburbs completed the following score options in the 1908 season:

- 37 tries
- 32 goals
- 0 field goals

The result:

Eastern Suburbs scored a total of 167 points in 1909.

The verdict:

- Eastern Suburbs try scoring ability dropped by 26% on their previous season.
- Eastern Suburbs goal scoring ability dropped by 3% on their previous season.
- Eastern Suburbs field goal kicking ability dropped by 100% on their previous season.
- Eastern Suburbs overall point scoring ability dropped by 16.8% on their previous season.
- Eastern Suburbs total point score dropped by 8.74% on their previous season.

=== Defence ===
The lowdown:

Eastern Suburbs conceded the following score options in the 1909 season:

- 38 tries
- 21 goals
- 0 field goals

The result:

Eastern Suburbs conceded a total of 141 points in 1909.

The verdict:

- Eastern Suburbs try scoring defence dropped by 26.3% on their previous season.
- Eastern Suburbs goal kicking defence dropped by 28.5% on their previous season.
- Eastern Suburbs field goal defence was maintained on their previous season.
- Eastern Suburbs overall defence dropped by 27.1% on their previous season.
- Eastern Suburbs total points against defensive effort dropped by 34% on their previous season.

== Season summary ==
- Eastern Suburbs made the semi-finals.
- Eastern Suburbs again won the reserve grade competition.
- Australian representatives:- Dave Brown, Dan Frawley, Mick Frawley, Larry O'Malley, Sandy Pearce and Johnno Stuntz.
- Larry O'Malley became the second Australian captain to come from the Eastern Suburbs club.

== Notes ==
1. Many of Eastern Suburbs leading players (particularly those who had gone away on the previous year's Kangaroo tour) had taken up contracts with English rugby league clubs . Missing much of the backend of the season. Excerpts from English rugby league club Warrington Wolves's 1909/10 yearbook show that Dan Frawley, Johnno Stuntz and Larry O'Malley all played with that club in the 1909/10 English season. It also reveals that they had telegrammed Dally Messenger attempting to sign both he and Sid Pearce. Another Eastern Suburbs player, Albert Rosenfeld, signed with Huddlesfield where he became one of English rugby league greatest try scorers.
2. Dally Messenger took no part in 1909 Eastern Suburbs season.

Preceded by 1908	Season; 1909	Succeeded by 1910
