= 1908 NSWRFL season =

Rugby league competition

- League: New South Wales Rugby Football League
- Duration: 20 April to 29 August
- Teams: 9
- Matches played: 43
- Points scored: 1108
- Premiers: South Sydney (1st title)
- Minor Premiers: South Sydney (1st title)
- Runners-up: Eastern Suburbs
- Wooden spoon: Cumberland (1st spoon)
- Top point-scorer: Horrie Miller (47)
- Top try-scorer: Horrie Miller (15)
- Disbanded: Cumberland

Second Grade
- Number of teams: 8 (1 withdrew)
- Premiers: Eastern Suburbs

Third Grade
- Number of teams: 8 (2 withdrew)
- Premiers: Sydney
- Runners-up: Drummoyne

The 1908 NSWRFL season was the inaugural season of the New South Wales Rugby Football League's premiership, Australia's first rugby league football club competition, in which nine clubs (eight from Sydney and one from Newcastle) competed from April till August 1908. The season culminated in the first premiership final, for the Royal Agricultural Society Challenge Shield, which was contested by Eastern Suburbs and South Sydney. In 1908 the NSWRFL also assembled a New South Wales representative team for the first ever interstate series against Queensland, and towards the end of the season, the NSWRFL's leading players were absent, having been selected to go on the first Kangaroo tour of Great Britain.

== Background ==
Early in the 20th century in Sydney, the game of rugby football was contested in competitions that were affiliated with the Rugby Football Union based in England. In 1895 the breakaway Northern Rugby Football Union was formed and its own version of rugby football started to evolve. The reasons for this split were ultimately based on the fact that clubs had wanted to compensate their players for time away from work due to injuries and travelling. After the Rugby Football Union denied the clubs' requests for compensation, many northern English clubs broke away and formed a new league, which implemented gradual rule changes to the football it played in an attempt to make a more attractive game for crowds. When crowd numbers started to rise, clubs were able to afford to pay players benefits as a direct result of increased gate takings.

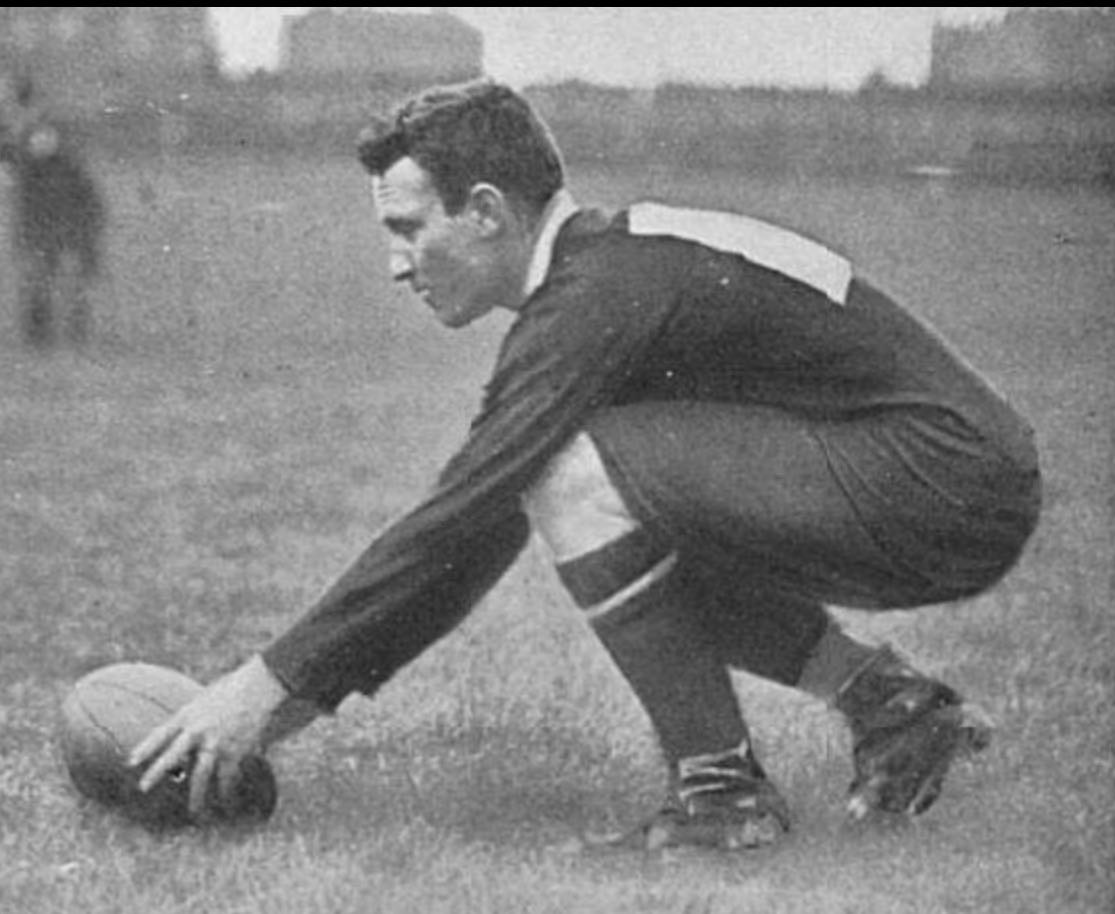
Dally Messenger - Bramley UK 1907

In 1906 in Sydney, crowd numbers for football matches began to increase significantly following the emergence of an especially talented player, Dally Messenger, whose skill was considered a pleasure to watch. It was around this time that the discontent of players with their clubs for failing to shift away from the amateur culture of the Rugby Football Union was starting to show. Even though bigger crowds had brought increased revenue to the game, footballers did not see any of the increased revenue going back to them. On 8 August 1907 a group of leading players and supporters met at Bateman's Hotel, George Street, Sydney and resolved to form the New South Wales Rugby Football League (NSWRFL). In the latter half of 1907, and unknown to the general public, Dally Messenger secretly agreed to sign on to play in a breakaway professional competition that would start the following year, run by the NSWRFL. It would turn out to be Messenger's popularity that would ensure the success of the new competition.

Early in 1908, a number of Rugby Football Union clubs held meetings across Sydney and Newcastle to decide whether or not breakaway clubs should be formed in preparation for the new Rugby Football League's premiership that was to start in the following months. The popularity amongst players in support of the new competition was overwhelming, with only some players deciding to continue playing in the traditional amateur Rugby Football Union competition. The Rugby Football League clubs that were formed were essentially breakaway clubs, and in most instances, teams continued the use of their team colours into the new competition. A key aspect of the new code was that players would be paid for playing the game. Adopting the playing rules of the rebel Northern Union of England, the new competition began on Easter Monday, 20 April 1908.

== Touring parties ==
The 1907–08 All Golds arrived back in Australia on 9 April. They spread themselves around the eight clubs that were preparing for the season. They helped advise them on the rules of rugby league. The team watched the first round of the competition before heading to Newcastle and playing the first game of rugby league in that city. They then played matches against New South Wales and Australia before heading north to Queensland. The final test was held on 6 June and Australia defeated New Zealand 14–9 for their first test win.

A New Zealand Māori side had arrived in Sydney in the first week of June and watched the All Golds' final test. They played four matches in New South Wales before also heading north to Queensland. On their return they played three more matches, including one against Australia, before financial and legal disputes ended the tour.

== Teams ==
Eight teams contested the first round of the season; seven teams from Sydney and one team from Newcastle. Another Sydney team, Cumberland, joined the competition in the second round, making it nine teams in total, however the club exited the League at the end of the season.

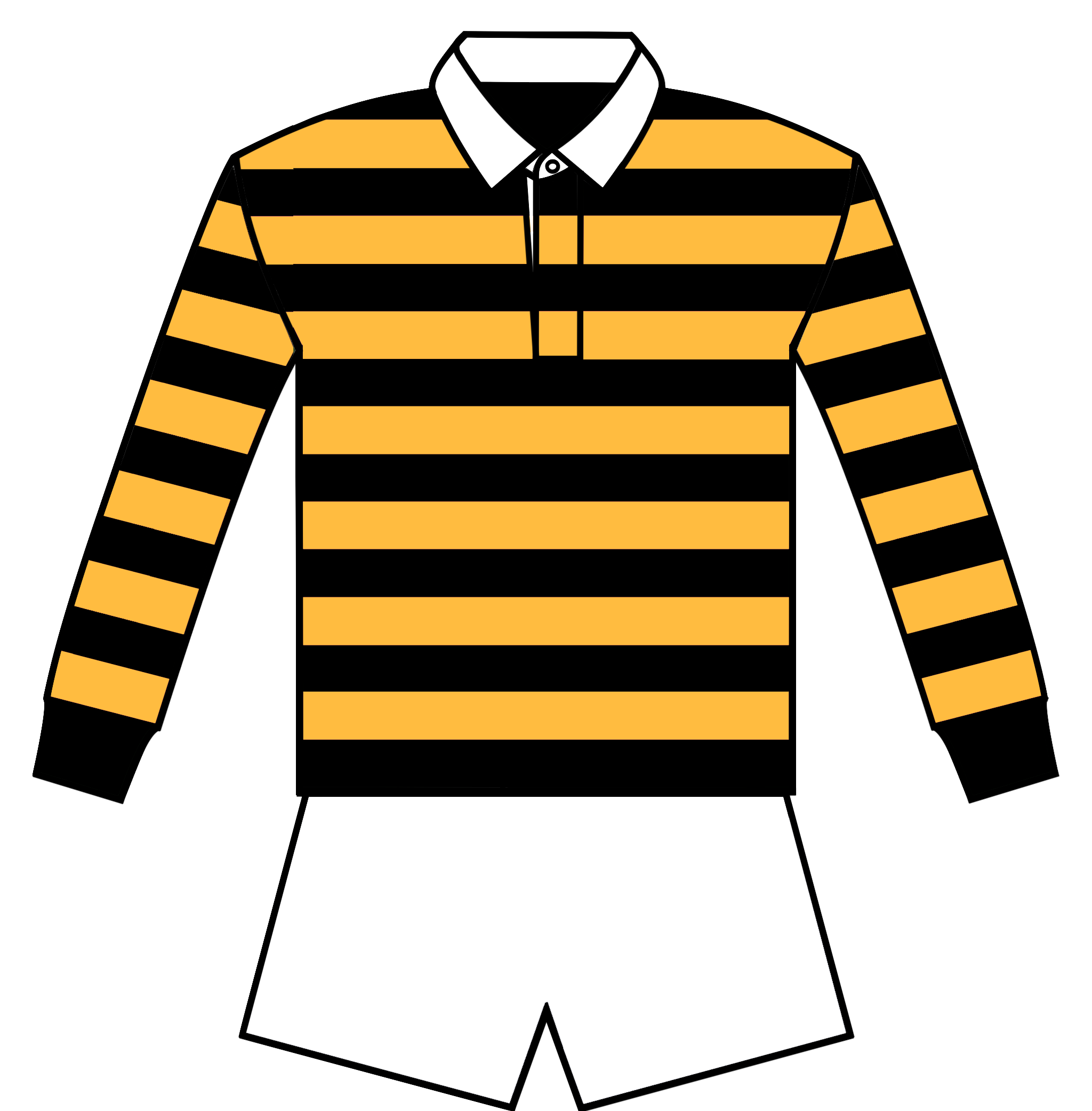
Balmain Formed on 23 January 1908 at Balmain Town Hall; Ground: Birchgrove Oval; Captain-Coach: Bob Graves

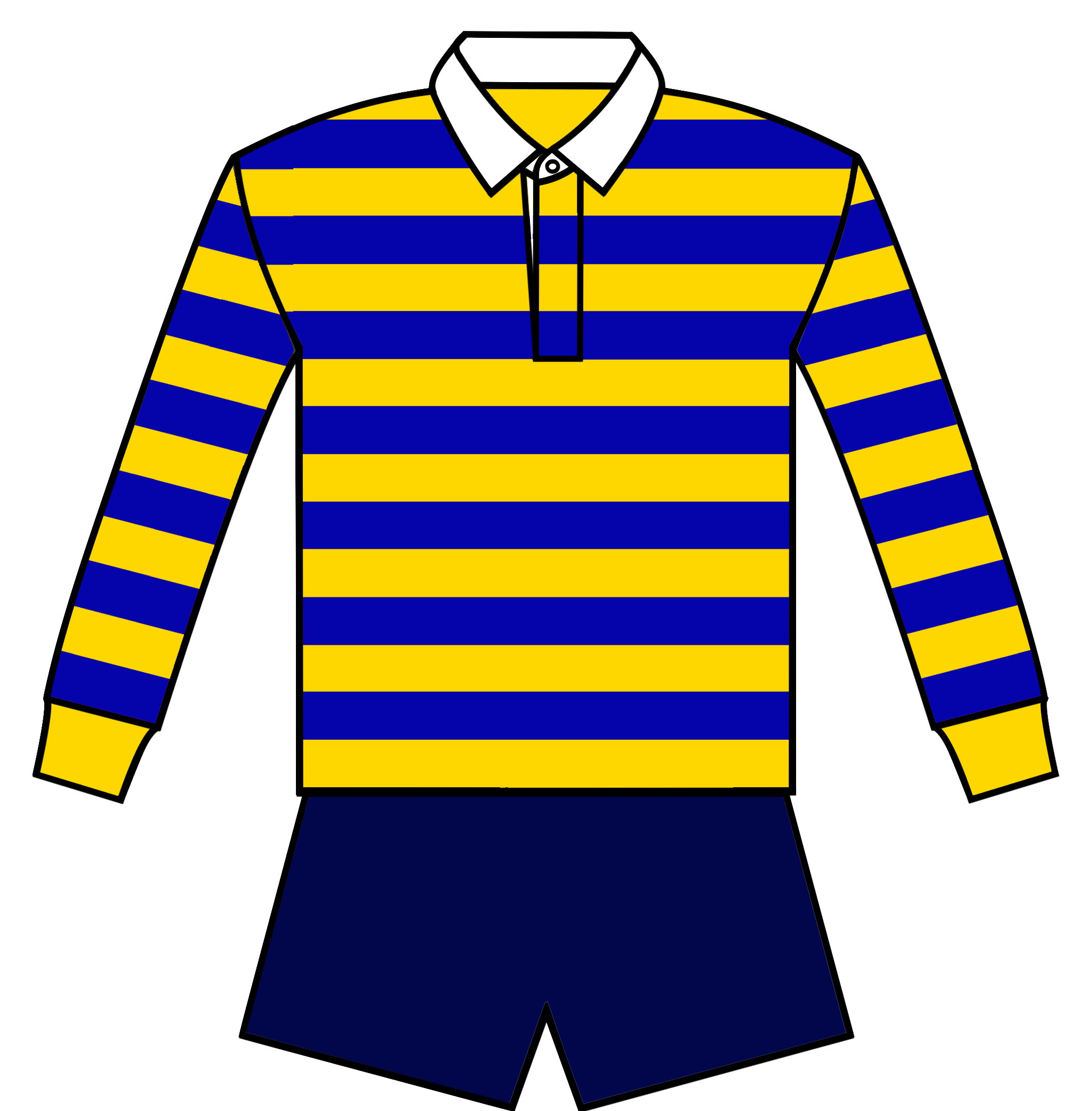
Cumberland Formed on 20 April 1908 at Horse and Jockey Hotel, Homebush; Ground: RAS Showground; Captain: Harry Bloomfield

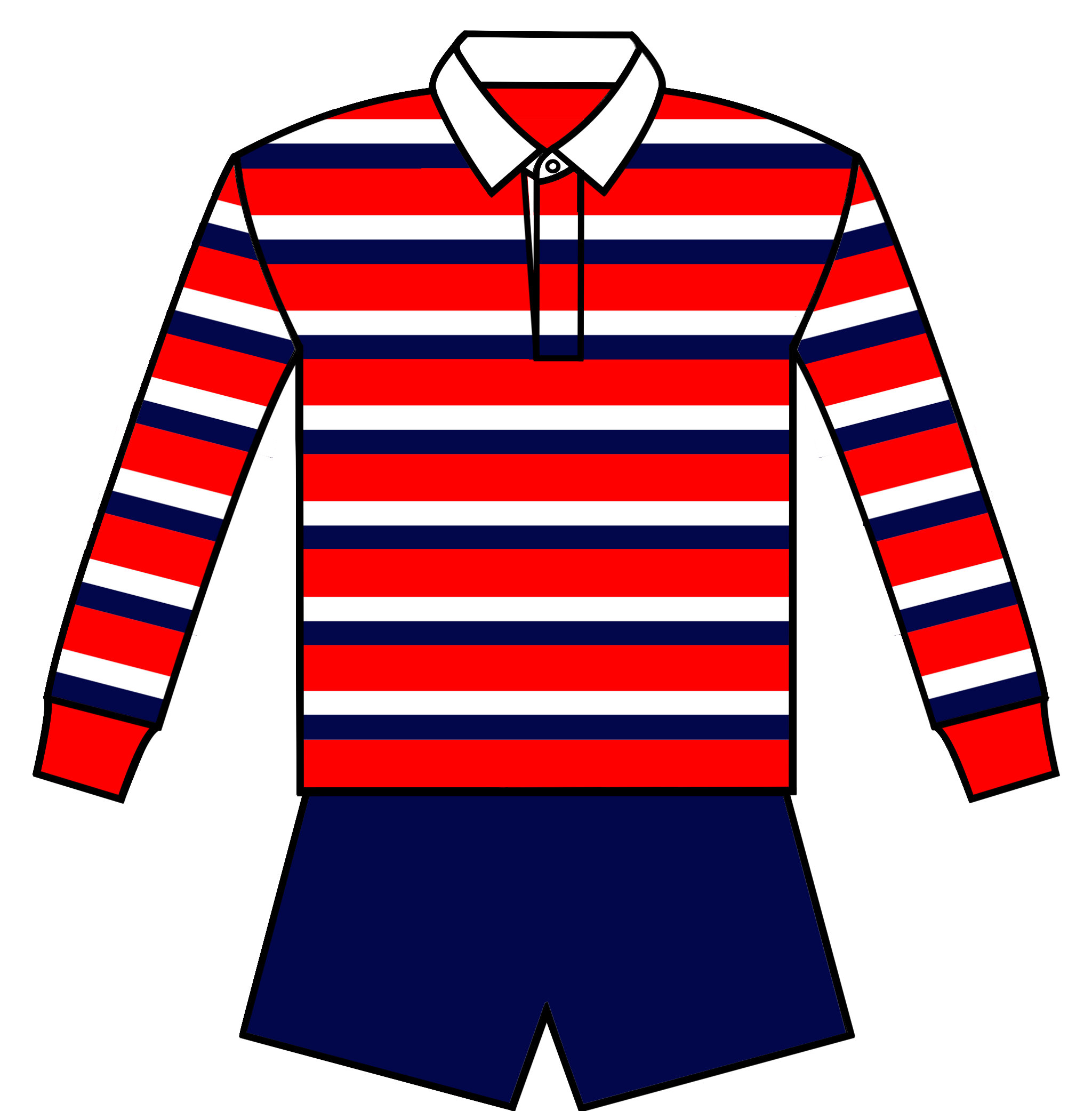
Eastern Suburbs Formed on 24 January 1908 at Paddington Town Hall; Ground: RAS Showground; Captain: Albert Rosenfeld

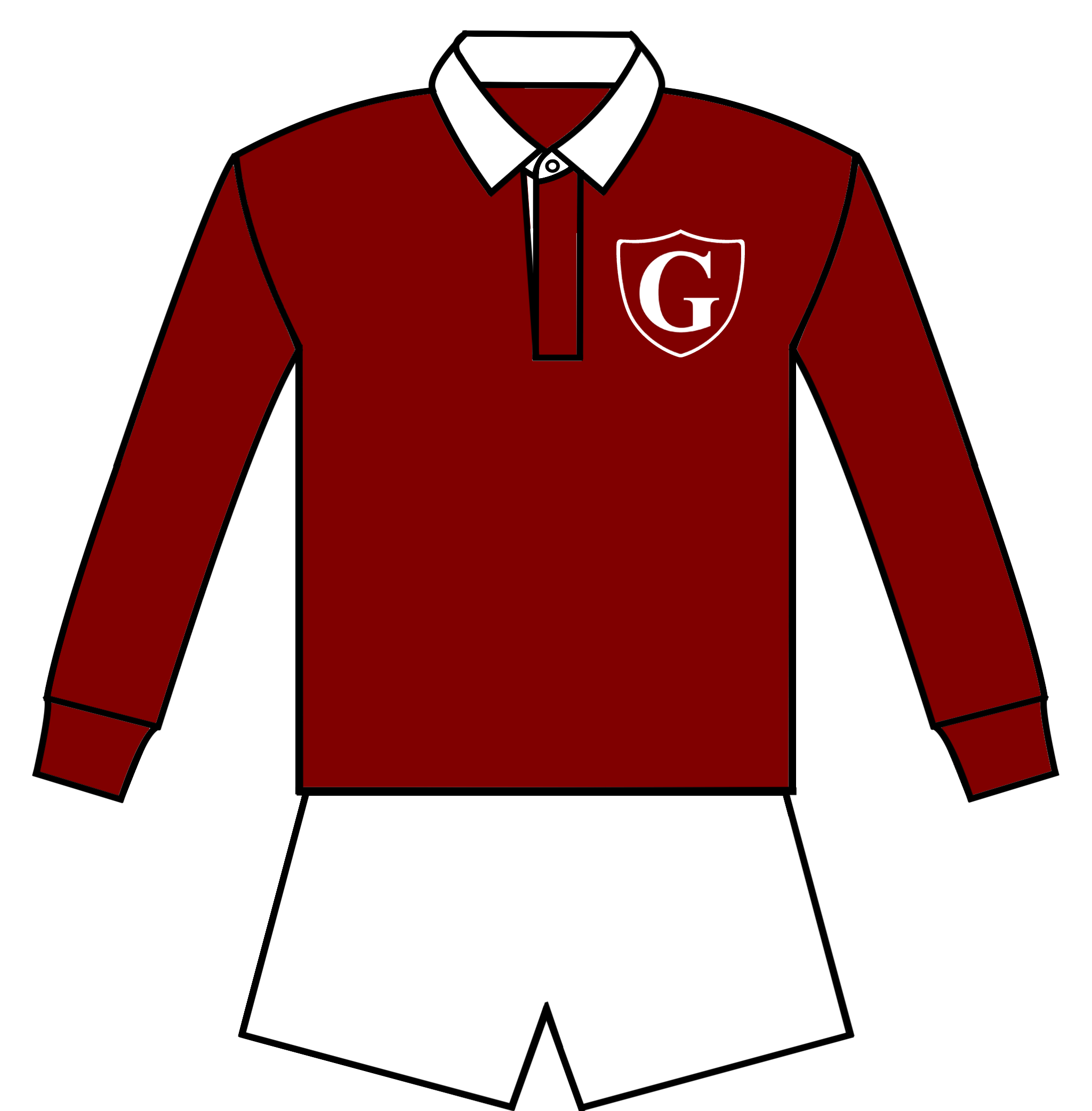
Glebe Formed on 9 January 1908; Ground: Wentworth Park; Captain: Alex Burdon

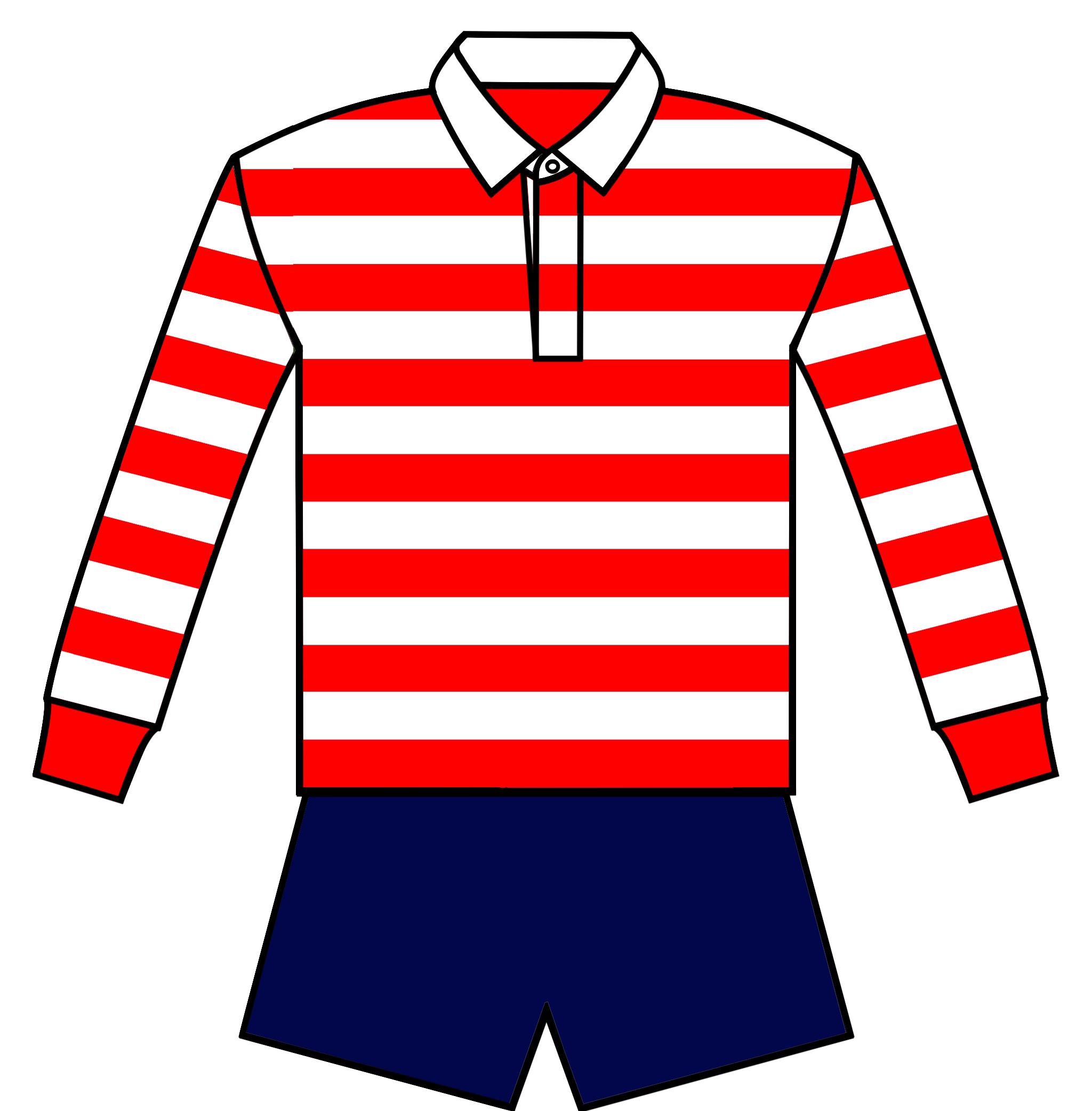
Newcastle Formed on 8 February 1908 at Pike's Rooms, Bolton Street, Newcastle; Captain: Stan Carpenter

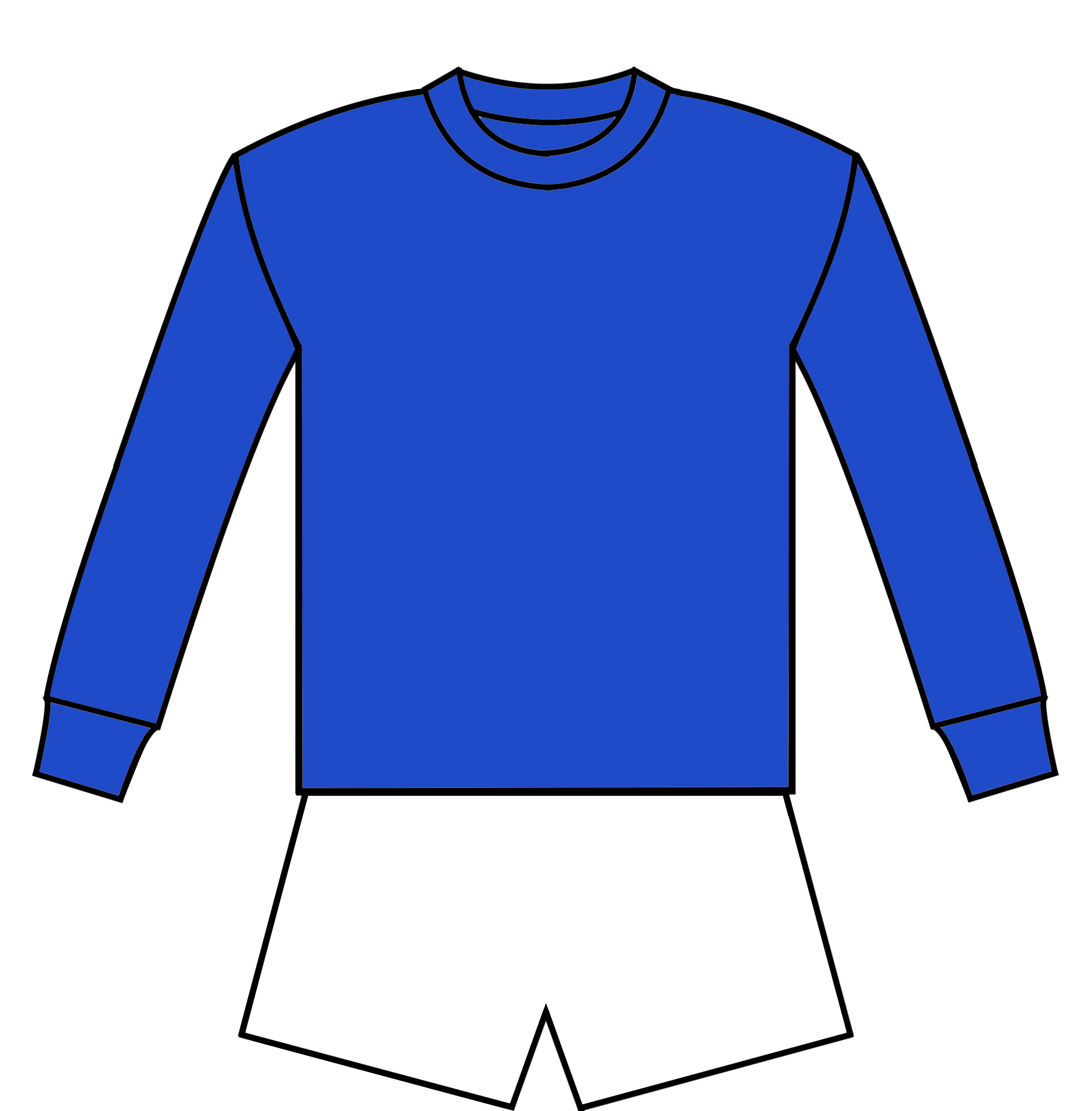
Newtown Formed on 8 January 1908; Ground: RAS Showground; Captain: Harry Hamill

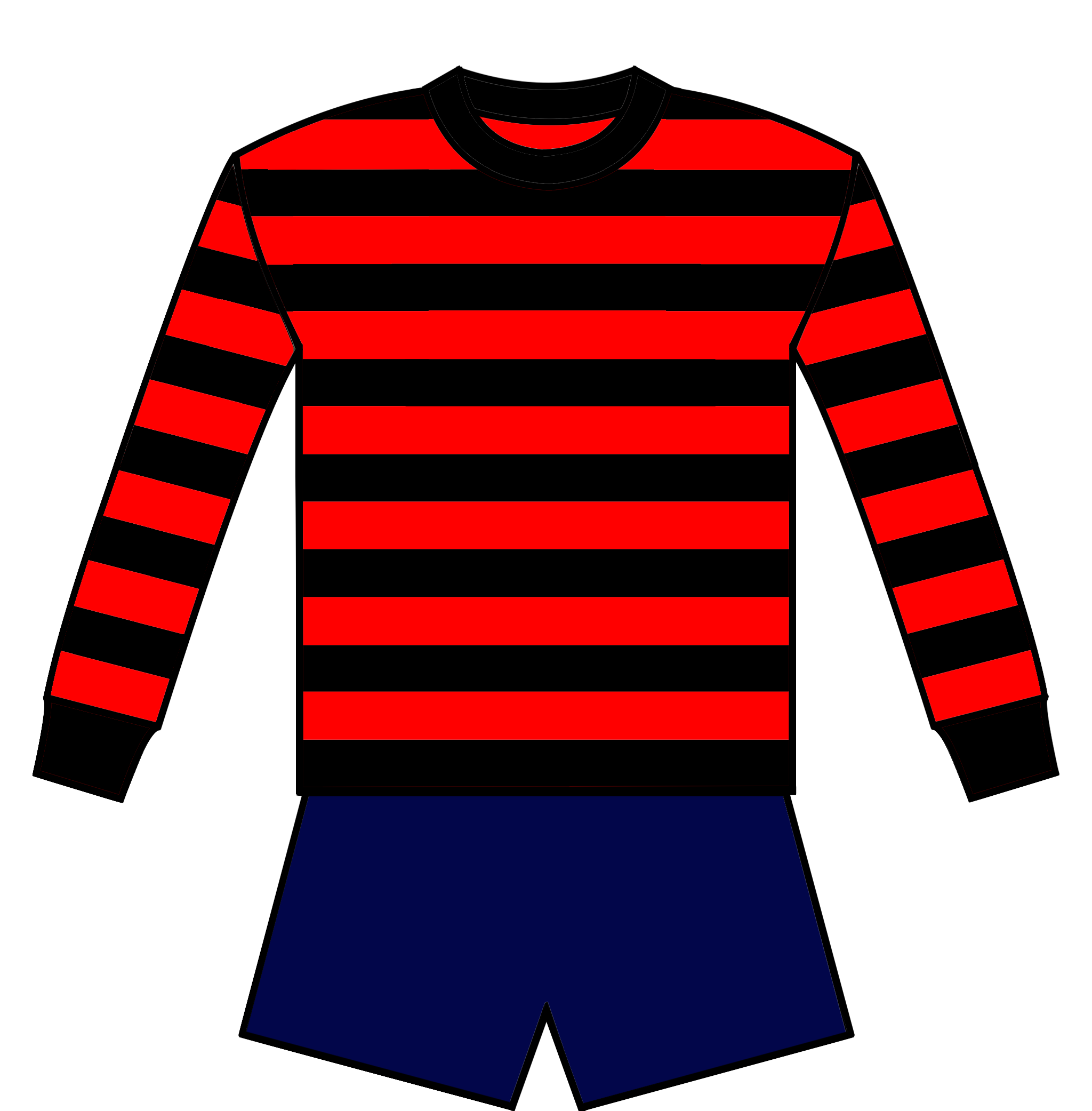
North Sydney Formed on 7 February 1908; Ground: Birchgrove Park; Captain: Albert Broomham

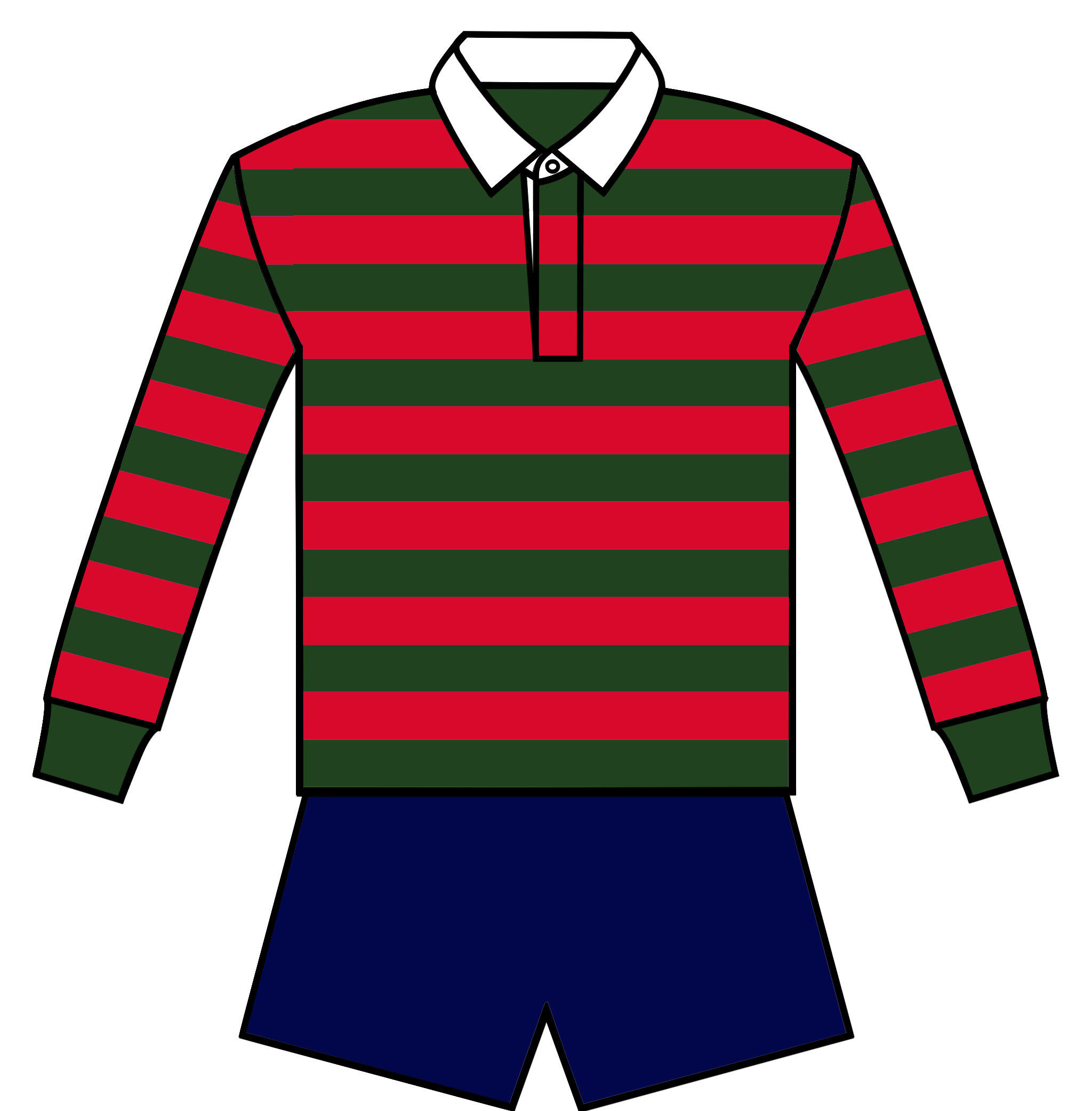
South Sydney Formed on 17 January 1908 at Redfern Town Hall; Ground: RAS Showground; Coach: Arthur Hennessy; Captain: Arthur Conlin

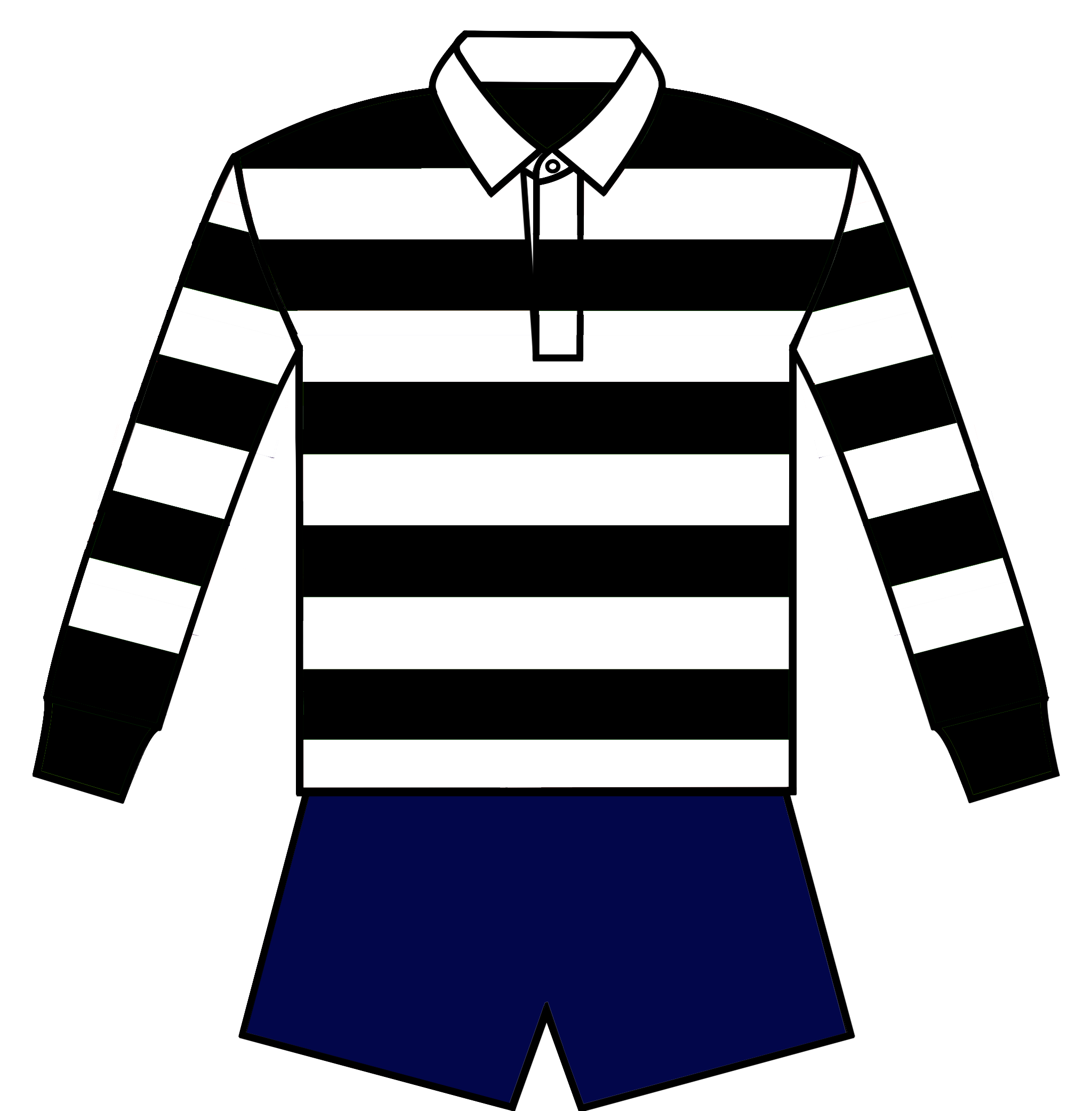
Western Suburbs Formed on 4 February 1908; Ground: Wentworth Park; Captain: Jim Stack

== Season summary ==
All four games of the premiership's opening round were played on 20 April 1908. Two games were held at Wentworth Park and the other two at Birchgrove Oval. In total, 3000 people attended at each venue for the back-to-back matches, with Glebe, Balmain, South Sydney and Eastern Suburbs winning their respective matches over Newcastle, Western Suburbs, North Sydney and Newtown. In all, ten regular-season rounds were played, to be followed by two semi-finals and then a final.

The season was a financial disaster for the New South Wales Rugby Football League. The competition had a distinct lack of star players, was hurt by a number of refereeing problems and suffered from a lack of exposure from the conservative press. Many players who had switched over from rugby union were sacked from their weekday jobs and were no longer allowed to enter the Sydney Cricket Ground, home of the New South Wales Rugby Union. The five captains that had moved from rugby union were also publicly ostracised.

The season's highest crowd came in the second round when South Sydney beat Cumberland in front of 20,000 people. Due to Cumberland having just been admitted into the premiership, this match was played 2 weeks after the other 3 games of round 2 had been completed. South Sydney consequently played their second match of the "round" because of this.

At the end of the season, Eastern Suburbs' Horrie Miller was the competition's top points scorer and top try scorer.

== Results ==
Monday, 20 April 1908
Round 1

Glebe	8–5	Newcastle

Wentworth Park
Attendance: 3,000

Monday, 20 April 1908
Round 1

South Sydney	11–7	North Sydney

Birchgrove Oval
Attendance: 3,000

Monday, 20 April 1908
Round 1

Balmain	24–0	Western Suburbs

Birchgrove Oval
Attendance: 3,000

Monday, 20 April 1908
Round 1

Eastern Suburbs	32–16	Newtown

Wentworth Park
Attendance: 3,000

Saturday, 25 April 1908
Round 2

Glebe	7–2	Newtown

Wentworth Park

Saturday, 25 April 1908
Round 2

South Sydney	42–7	Western Suburbs

Royal Agricultural Society Showground

Saturday, 25 April 1908
Round 2

Balmain	5–10	North Sydney

Birchgrove Oval
Attendance: 1,500

Saturday, 9 May 1908
Round 2

South Sydney	23–2	Cumberland

Royal Agricultural Society Showground
Attendance: 20,000

Saturday, 16 May 1908
Round 3

Glebe	25–8	Western Suburbs

Wentworth Park
Attendance: 3,000

Saturday, 16 May 1908
Round 3

South Sydney	12–13	Eastern Suburbs

Royal Agricultural Society Showground
Attendance: 3,000

Saturday, 16 May 1908
Round 3

Balmain	13–13	Newtown

Birchgrove Oval
Attendance: 2,500

Saturday, 16 May 1908
Round 3

Newcastle	37–0	Cumberland

Wentworth Park
Attendance: 3,000

Saturday, 23 May 1908
Round 4

Glebe	7–2	North Sydney

Wentworth Park

Saturday, 23 May 1908
4

Western Suburbs	2–24	Newcastle

Royal Agricultural Society Showground
Attendance: 1,500

Saturday, 23 May 1908
Round 4

Cumberland	6–16	Newtown

Birchgrove Oval

Saturday, 23 May 1908
Round 4

Eastern Suburbs	21–8	Balmain

Royal Agricultural Society Showground
Attendance: 1,500

Saturday, 30 May 1908
Round 5

Glebe	22–7	Cumberland

Wentworth Park
Attendance: 1,200

Saturday, 30 May 1908
Round 5

North Sydney	21–9	Newcastle

Birchgrove Oval

Saturday, 30 May 1908
Round 5

South Sydney	31–3	Newtown

Royal Agricultural Society Showground
Attendance: 800

Saturday, 30 May 1908
Round 5

Eastern Suburbs	9–8	Western Suburbs

Royal Agricultural Society Showground
Attendance: 800

Saturday, 13 June 1908
Round 6

Newtown	8–17	Newcastle

Royal Agricultural Society Showground
Attendance: 14,000

Saturday, 20 June 1908
Round 6

Glebe	5–21	South Sydney

Wentworth Park
Attendance: 1,500

Saturday, 20 June 1908
Round 6

Balmain	16–4	Cumberland

Birchgrove Oval
Attendance: 1,200

Saturday, 20 June 1908
Round 6

Eastern Suburbs	19–11	North Sydney

Royal Agricultural Society Showground
Attendance: 1,500

Saturday, 27 June 1908
Round 7

South Sydney	30–11	Newcastle

Royal Agricultural Society Showground
Attendance: 4,000

Saturday, 27 June 1908
Round 7

Western Suburbs	8–23	North Sydney

Wentworth Park
Attendance: 800

Saturday, 27 June 1908
Round 7

Balmain	3–16	Glebe

Birchgrove Oval
Attendance: 3,000

Saturday, 27 June 1908
Round 7

Eastern Suburbs	26–5	Cumberland

Royal Agricultural Society Showground
Attendance: 4,000

Saturday, 4 July 1908
Round 8

Glebe	11–5	Eastern Suburbs

Wentworth Park

Saturday, 4 July 1908
Round 8

Newtown	7–15	North Sydney

Wentworth Park

Saturday, 4 July 1908
Round 8

Balmain	5–28	Newcastle

Birchgrove Oval
Attendance: 3,000

Saturday, 4 July 1908
Round 8

Cumberland	14–6	Western Suburbs

Birchgrove Oval
Attendance: 3,000

Saturday, 25 July 1908
Round 9

Newtown	5–6	Western Suburbs

Wentworth Park
Attendance: 200

Saturday, 25 July 1908
Round 9

Balmain	2–16	South Sydney

Birchgrove Oval
Attendance: 800

Saturday, 25 July 1908
Round 9

Cumberland	0–45	North Sydney

Wentworth Park
Attendance: 200

Saturday, 25 July 1908
Round 9

Eastern Suburbs	34–17	Newcastle

Royal Agricultural Society Showground
Attendance: 400

Saturday, 8 August 1908
Round 10

Glebe	5–10	Balmain

Birchgrove Oval
Attendance: 3,000

Saturday, 8 August 1908
Round 10

Newtown	0–21	North Sydney

Birchgrove Oval
Attendance: 3,000

Saturday, 8 August 1908
Round 10

South Sydney	8–3	Newcastle

Wentworth Park

Saturday, 8 August 1908
Round 10

Eastern Suburbs	24–2	Western Suburbs

Royal Agricultural Society Showground
Attendance: 200

Saturday, 15 August 1908
Minor Semi

Eastern Suburbs	23–10	North Sydney

Royal Agricultural Society Showground
Attendance: 400

Saturday, 15 August 1908
Major Semi

South Sydney	16–3	Glebe

Wentworth Park
Attendance: 1,200

Saturday, 29 August 1908
Final

South Sydney	14–12	Eastern Suburbs

Royal Agricultural Society Showground
Attendance: 4,000

== Ladder ==
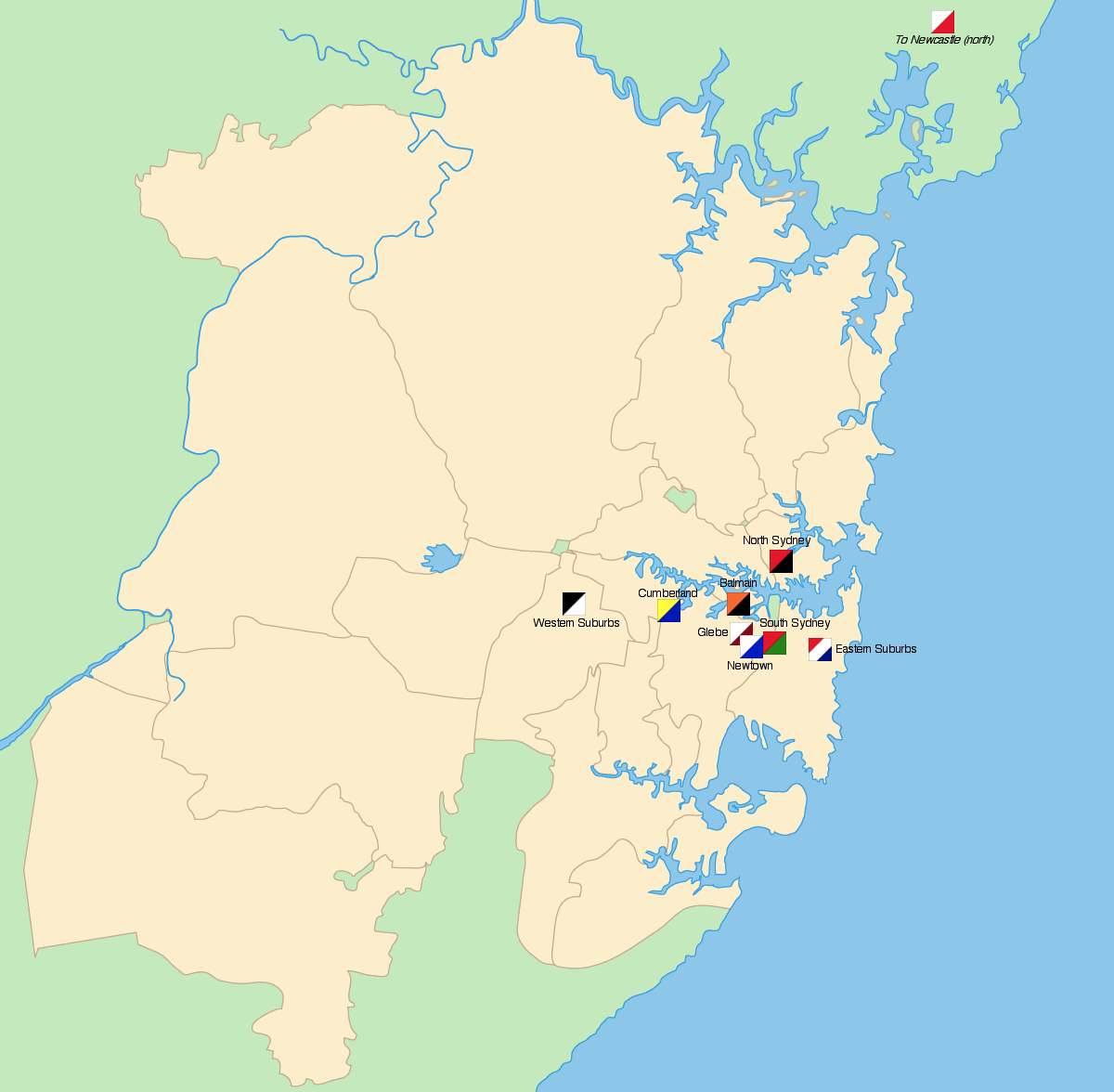
The geographical locations of the foundation teams across Sydney.

	Team	Pld	W	D	L	B	PF	PA	PD	Pts
1	South Sydney	9	8	0	1	1	194	53	+141	18
2	Eastern Suburbs	9	8	0	1	1	183	90	+93	18
3	Glebe	9	7	0	2	1	106	63	+43	16
4	North Sydney	9	6	0	3	1	155	66	+89	14
5	Newcastle	9	4	0	5	1	151	116	+35	10
6	Balmain	9	3	1	5	1	86	113	−27	9
7	Newtown	9	1	1	7	1	70	148	−78	5
8	Western Suburbs	9	1	0	8	1	47	190	−143	4
9	Cumberland	8	1	0	7	1	38	191	−153	4*

Cumberland's final position in the 1908 ladder has long been debated due to the inconsistent number of byes that each team received during the season. Ian Collis and Alan Whiticker stated in The History of Rugby League Clubs that Cumberland had received two byes. Shawn Dollin of Rugby League Project wrote the following about this irregularity:

"Newspapers of the day had added a "bye" column to the competition table after Cumberland joined, and for the first few rounds they indicated that Cumberland had none. On the 24th of June however, this changed - the number of byes next to Cumberland became 1. In August, Cumberland had their scheduled bye in round 10. As confirmed in the book 'The History of Rugby League Clubs' by Ian Collis and Alan Whiticker, Cumberland was awarded their second bye for the season. Clearly, the NSWRFL had deemed they were entitled to the additional 2 points from a bye in round 1.

The reason and exact timing of when this decision was made is unknown, and the only consequence is who was awarded the competition's first ever wooden spoon - them, or Western Suburbs. It was to be Cumberland's only season, but with 2 byes and a win, they were spared the ignominy."

As of 2025, Cumberland is officially listed as the holder of the 1908 wooden spoon by the National Rugby League, contradicting the extra bye theory.

=== Ladder progression ===
- Green indicates top 4 teams
- - indicates the team entered the competition late.

	Team	1	2	3	4	5	6	7	8	9	10
1	South Sydney	2	6 (Note: South Sydney played two matches in two weeks in what was still designated as round two. This was because Cumberland, a new team applying for inclusion in the competition after it had started, played a trial game in the first week of round 2 against Eastern Suburbs. Once the league approved of their inclusion, they played their first premiership match against South Sydney a fortnight later in the only game of the weekend. Because of this, South Sydney was allocated no game nor a bye in round 4, bringing them level with other teams in terms of matches and byes allocated to date.)	6	6>	8	10	12	14	16	18
2	Eastern Suburbs	2	4	6	8	10	12	14	14	16	18
3	Glebe	2	4	6	8	10	10	12	14	16	16
4	North Sydney	0	2	4	4	6	6	8	10	12	14
5	Newcastle	0	2	4	6	6	8	8	10	10	10
6	Balmain	2	2	3	3	5	7	7	7	7	9
7	Newtown	0	0	1	3	3	3	5	5	5	5
8	Western Suburbs	0	0	0	0	0	2	2	2	4	4
9	Cumberland	–	0	0	0	0	0	0	2	2	4

== Finals ==
The competition was decided on which side had the most premiership points at the end of the year. After the regular season had completed, the top four teams played an extra round in order break the deadlock between South Sydney and Eastern Suburbs which both ended up on 18 points. After these two teams won their respective semi-finals, a final was played. South Sydney overcame a depleted Eastern Suburbs side to take away the inaugural premiership.

Semi-finals
15 August 1908 – Agricultural
Eastern Suburbs	23
North Sydney	10
15 August 1908 – Wentworth
South Sydney	16
Glebe	3

Final
29 August 1908 – Agricultural
South Sydney	14
Eastern Suburbs	12

== Final ==
South Sydney	Position	Eastern Suburbs
Webby Neil	FB	Bill King
Frank Storie	WG	William Smith
Fred Jarman	CE	Percy McNamara
Ed Fry	CE	Dave Brown
Leo Senior	WG	Horrie Miller
Arthur Conlin (c)	FE	Harold Kelley
Jack Leveson	HB	Lou D'Alpuget
Tom Golden	PR	Percy White
Jack Coxon	HK	Herb Brackenreg
Dick Green	PR	Mick Frawley
Arthur McCallum	SR	Jersey Flegg (c)
Jack Cochrane	SR	Ted Briscoe
Harry Butler	LK	Bob Mable
Arthur Hennessy	Coach	Daniel McCart

Both teams were weakened by the absence of players selected to travel to England on the first Kangaroo tour. The match had been postponed a week to avoid a clash with a major rugby union representative game.

The following is a report from The Sydney Morning Herald newspaper on the final between South Sydney and Eastern Suburbs.

"The final match to determine the premiership in the first grade of the Rugby League was played on the Agricultural Society's Ground on Saturday in perfect weather. The match was shorn of much interest on account of prominent members of both teams being absent, on their way to England. In accordance with the League rules, one-third of the profits of the match will be devoted to charity. The game, which was brilliant, and at times rather rough, resulted in a victory for South Sydney by 14 points to 12. The winners deserved their victory.

South Sydney lost the toss and kicked off from the southern end with an easterly wind blowing across the ground. South Sydney had the better of the early play and gained possession from several scrums. After a passing move involving Conlin and Senior, Senior scored the first try of the match.

Immediately afterwards Herb Brackenreg kicked a penalty goal for Eastern Suburbs. South Sydney now attacked strongly, and appeared likely to score, but Horrie Miller, intercepting a yard or so from his own line, raced the whole length of the ground and scored a beautiful try behind the posts. Brackenreg converted, making the scores seven points to three in favour of Eastern Suburbs.

On resuming South Sydney obtained the upper hand, forwards and backs playing brilliantly. They made repeated dashes, but could not break through for a long time. Once Storie got across, but was tackled. Then the three-quarters made fine dashes on either wing. From the last of these, which ended on the line, Golden scored a try, which Green failed to convert. Just before half time, Edward Fry marked at Eastern Suburb's 25, and Conlin kicked a fine goal, South Sydney leading by eight points to seven.

The second half proved exciting from start to finish, Eastern Suburbs at first attacked and South Sydney got out of the difficulty by forcing. South Sydney now became aggressive, the three-quarters combining very neatly. They repeatedly penetrated the defence, but could not put the finishing touch to the movements for some time. At length Levison obtained a scrum and passed to Conlin, on the wing. The latter dashed for the line, and scored. The kick at goal failed. South Sydney 11 points to seven.

Eastern Suburbs put in fine work. Dan Frawley and Brackenreg dribbling almost to the line. Then McNamara dropped a field goal from centre, which reduced South Sydney's lead to two points. McNamara almost repeated the performance a few minutes later, South Sydney rallied, and Levison getting from a scrum at the 25 passed in to Butler, who scored. The kick at goal failed.

Play now became very rough, several players being knocked out temporarily, and the referee had to administer cautions. Near time, Eastern Suburbs came with a rush, and Miller scored a good try, which Brackenreg failed to convert.

There was no further scoring, South Sydney winning by 14 points to 12.

South Sydney five-eighth and captain Arthur Conlin was the star of the day for the winners and was triumphantly carried from the field by his teammates.

=== Scoreboard ===
1908 NSWRFL Final

Saturday, 29 August
15:15 AEST (UTC+10)

South Sydney	14 – 12	Eastern Suburbs
Tries: 4 Senior; Golden; Conlin; Butler; Goals: 0 Conlin (0/3); Green (0/1); Goals from mark: 1 Conlin (1/1)	1st: 8–7; 2nd: 6–5; Report	Tries: 2 Miller (2); Goals: 2 Brackenreg (2/3); Drop goals: 1 McNamara; Goals from mark: 0 Brackenreg (0/1)

RAS Showground, Sydney
Attendance: ≈4,000
Referee: Charlie Hutchinson

== Statistics ==
=== Points ===
	Player	Team	P	T	G	FG	Pts
1	Horrie Miller	Eastern Suburbs		15	1	0	47
2	Herb Brackenreg	Eastern Suburbs		2	17	0	40
3	Arthur Butler	South Sydney		6	11	0	40
4	Stan Carpenter	Newcastle		2	16	0	38
5	Albert Conlon	Glebe		1	17	0	37
6	Dick Green	South Sydney		6	8	0	34
7	Harry Glanville	North Sydney		2	14	0	34
8	Alf Latta	Balmain		4	10	0	32
9	Bill Bailey	Newcastle		9	1	0	29
10	Jack Scott	Newtown		5	6	0	27

=== Tries ===
	Player	Team	P	T
1	Horrie Miller	Eastern Suburbs		15
2	Bill Bailey	Newcastle		9
3	Daniel Frawley	Eastern Suburbs		8
4	Dick Green	South Sydney		6
4	Harry Butler	South Sydney		6
4	Arthur Butler	South Sydney		6
4	Frank Storie	South Sydney		6
4	Tommy Anderson	South Sydney		6
4	Billy Cann	South Sydney		6

== Lower Grades ==
The NSWRFL also conducted Second and Third Grade competitions in this inaugural season. Matches were held on the same day that the First Grade competition commenced, Easter Monday, 20 April.

=== Second Grade ===
Eight teams entered the Second Grade competition: Balmain, Eastern Suburbs, Enfield, Glebe, Newtown, North Sydney, South Sydney, Western Suburbs. By the end of May, however, Enfield had withdrawn. Western Suburbs were not listed to play in July or August.

Eastern Suburbs were the dominant team in the grade. Arrangements were made for the team to play two curtain raisers to representative matches, the first against a Combined Third Grade team. After the penultimate round, the Sydney Sportsman reported, "Glebe II. forfeited to Eastern Suburbs II. at the Agricultural Ground. This gives E.E. the [Second Grade] premiership, for they have been unbeaten throughout the season." Their opponents for the final round of matches also forfeited.

=== Third Grade ===
Eight teams entered the Third Grade competition: Balmain, Drummoyne, Eastern Suburbs, Glebe, Newtown, North Sydney, South Sydney, Sydney. North Sydney and South Sydney appear to have withdrawn, however, as they are not listed in the fixtures published on Saturdays in the Sydney Morning Herald in July or August.

The Sydney team won the competition. Arrangements were made for the team to play the second grade premiers, Eastern Suburbs II, in a curtain raiser to the first grade final on 30 August. With many of the Eastern Suburbs second graders required to fill in first grade for club-mates in transit to England, this was quickly changed. Sydney, defeated the third grade runner's up, Drummoyne, in the curtain-raiser, by 11 to 3. The Sydney Morning Herald reported that Sydney had "an unbeaten record", however a result from 8 August in the Sunday Times has Eastern Suburbs III defeating Sydney, by 11 to nil.

== Bibliography ==
- O'Reily, Titus (20 August 2018). A Thoroughly Unhelpful History of Australian Sport. Penguin Books. ISBN 9780143793519.
- Whiticker, Alan; Collis, Ian (2006). The History of Rugby League Clubs. New Holland, Sydney. ISBN 9781741104707.
- Coffey, John; Wood, Bernie (2008). 100 years: Māori rugby league, 1908–2008. New Zealand: Huia Publishers. ISBN 978-1-86969-331-2.
