= Lou D'Alpuget =

Australian rugby league footballer

Personal information
- Full name: Louis Ambrose Patrick D'Alpuget
- Born: Feb 1880 Wodonga, Victoria
- Died: 6 July 1957 (aged 76–77) Moore Park, New South Wales, Australia

Playing information
- Position: Halfback, Five-eighth, Centre
Club
Years	Team	Pld	T	G	FG	P
1908–09	Eastern Suburbs	12	2	0	0	6
1911	Annandale	5	0	0	0	0
	Total	17	2	0	0	6
Representative
Years	Team	Pld	T	G	FG	P
1907	New South Wales	2	0	0	0	0
1908	Metropolis	2	0	0	0	0
- Source: As of 11 March 2019

Louis Ambrose Patrick D'Alpuget (1880–1957) was a pioneer rugby league player in the New South Wales Rugby League (NSWRL) competition who played for the Eastern Suburbs and Annandale clubs. Of French descent, He played for New South Wales in the very first rugby match run by the newly created 'New South Wales Rugby Football League' which had just split away from the established New South Wales Rugby Football Union.

D'Alpuget, a halfback, played rugby league in 1908 - the inaugural season of the sport in Australia. He was a member of Sydney's Eastern Suburbs first team, kicking the first ever goal for the club.

D'Alpuget was a member of the Eastern Suburbs side that was defeated by South Sydney in the NSWRL's first premiership final. D'Alpugent had just one season with the Eastern Suburbs club before joining the now defunct Annandale club. D'Alpuget's only representative match came in 1908 when he was selected for Sydney against a touring New Zealand Maori side.

A former rugby union player, D'Alpuget was a member of the rebel sides that played against the New Zealand 'All Golds' in the series that helped to establish rugby league in Australia. He was awarded Life Membership of the New South Wales Rugby League in 1914.

D'Alpuget was also a founding member of Bondi Surf Club.

He is remembered as the Sydney Roosters 4th ever player.

Lou d'Alpuget was the grandfather of noted author Blanche d'Alpuget.

== Death ==
Lou D'Alpuget died at the Sydney Sports Ground while watching Souths v Norths on 6 July 1957. A well attended funeral took place at Rookwood Cemetery on 9 Jul 1957, mourners included Dally Messenger, Webby Neill and Harold Mathews.
