= Surridge =

Surridge is a surname. Notable people with the surname include:

- Arthur Surridge (1884–1963), Australian rugby league footballer
- Arthur Surridge Hunt (1871–1934), English papyrologist
- Steve Surridge (born 1970), New Zealand rugby union footballer
- Stuart Surridge (1917–1992), English cricketer
- Victor Surridge (1892–1911), English motor-cycle racer

== See also ==
- Surridge Sports, a sportswear company
