= Herb Brackenreg =

Australian rugby league footballer

Personal information
- Full name: Herbert Leslie Brackenreg
- Born: 7 August 1876 Scone, New South Wales, Australia
- Died: 17 August 1939 (aged 63) Brisbane, Queensland, Australia

Playing information
- Position: Prop, Hooker, Lock
Club
Years	Team	Pld	T	G	FG	P
1908	Eastern Suburbs	11	2	17	0	40
Representative
Years	Team	Pld	T	G	FG	P
1907–08	New South Wales	3	0	2	0	4
1909–11	Queensland	15	3	31	0	71
1909–10	Australia	3	0	7	0	14
- Source: As of 14 February 2019

Herbert Leslie Brackenreg (1876–1939) was a pioneer Australian rugby league footballer who played in the 1900s and 1910s.

== Playing career ==
In 1907 he played for New South Wales in the very first rugby match run by the newly created 'New South Wales Rugby Football League' which had just split away from the established New South Wales Rugby Football Union. He also played for Sydney's Eastern suburbs club in the New South Wales Rugby Football League premiership's inaugural season – 1908. A goal-kicking front row forward, Brackenreg, played rugby league for the Eastern Suburbs club.

An Eastern Suburbs rugby union player, Brackenreg had been a member of the rebel New South Wales sides that played against the rebel New Zealand 'All Blacks' in the 1907 series that helped to establish rugby league in Australia. He played in 8 NSWRFL Premiership matches for Easts including that club's first match and was a member of the NSWRL's first premiership decider played against local rival, South Sydney.

In that first season Brackenreg was selected to represent his state, New South Wales, in 2 matches. The following season Brackenreg moved to Queensland, where he played for the South Brisbane club and representing his new state in 5 matches and playing in 3 tests for Australia, he also represented Australasia. Herb Brackenreg is listed on the Australian Players Register as Kangaroo No. 55. He was awarded Life Membership of the New South Wales Rugby League in 1914.

Brackenreg once defeated Dally Messenger in an exhibition goal kicking competition. He is remembered as the Sydney Roosters' second ever player.

He died on 17 August 1939 and was buried at the South Brisbane Cemetery.
