= Jack Cochrane (rugby league) =

Australian rugby league footballer (1882-1946)

Personal information
- Full name: John Cochrane
- Born: 21 March 1882; Sydney, New South Wales, Australia
- Died: 20 July 1946 (aged 64)

Playing information
- Position: Second-row
Club
Years	Team	Pld	T	G	FG	P
1908	South Sydney	9	1	0	0	3

Jack Cochrane also known as "John Cochrane" was an Australian rugby league footballer who played in the 1900s. He played for South Sydney in the New South Wales Rugby League (NSWRL) competition. Cochrane was a foundation player for South Sydney playing in the club's first ever game.

== Background ==
Cochrane played rugby union for the South Sydney rugby union side before switching codes to play Rugby League.

== Playing career ==
Cochrane made his first grade debut for Souths against North Sydney at Birchgrove Oval in Round 1 1908 which was the opening week of the NSWRL competition in Australia. Souths won the match 11–7 in front of 3000 people.

In round 5, Cochrane scored his first and only try in a 31-3 win against Newtown.

Souths went on to claim the inaugural minor premiership in 1908 and reach the first NSWRL grand final against rivals Eastern Suburbs. Cochrane played in the match as Souths claimed their first premiership winning 14–12 at the Royal Agricultural Society Grounds in front of 4000 spectators. This would be Cochrane's final game for Souths.
