= Alfred Playfair =

Australian rugby league footballer

Alfred Donald Playfair (1871–1943) was a rugby league footballer in the New South Wales Rugby League's inaugural season of 1908.

Alfred was a member of the Sydney side Eastern Suburbs – one of only two surviving foundation clubs.

During his life he was vice president of the Royal Agricultural Society.

He is listed as the Sydney Roosters 21st ever player.
