= Harry Hamill =

Australian rugby league footballer

Personal information
- Full name: Henry Clay Hamill
- Born: 15 March 1879 Redfern, New South Wales
- Died: 19 December 1947 (aged 68) Woollahra, New South Wales

Playing information
- Position: Prop
Club
| Years | Team | Pld | T | G | FG | P |
|---|---|---|---|---|---|---|
| 1908 | Newtown | 8 | 1 | 0 | 0 | 3 |
- Source: Whiticker/Hudson 1995

Henry Clay Hamill (1879–1947) was a pioneer Australian rugby league footballer who played in the 1900s, and a co-founder of Rugby League in Australia.

Born to parents William and Isabella Hamill at Redfern, New South Wales in 1879, Harry Hamill was one of the original founders of the Newtown Jets rugby league football club in 1908 and was the club's first captain. Originally a rugby union player with Newtown, Harry Hamill captained the Newtown in their first season before retiring.

As a founding member of Newtown and pioneer of the game of rugby league in Sydney, Harry Hamill was awarded Life Membership of the NSWRFL in 1914.

Harry Hamill was a journalist during his working life and created the Rugby League News in 1920. This publication became what is now the Big League Magazine.

Harry Hamill died on 19 December 1947, aged 68 late of Woollahra, New South Wales and was survived by his eight children.
