= W. Smith =

Australian rugby league footballer

W Smith
Personal information
- Full name: William Smith
- Born: 15 November 1886
- Died: 2 November 1918 (aged 31)

Playing information
- Position: Wing, Centre
Club
Years	Team	Pld	T	G	FG	P
1908–09	Eastern Suburbs	7	1	0	0	3
1910	Balmain	12	6	1	0	20
1912	Eastern Suburbs	3	1	0	0	3
	Total	22	8	1	0	26

William Smith (Sydney was a rugby league footballer in the New South Wales Rugby Football League premiership, Australia's first major competition in the sport.

Smith, who played on the wing position, has the honour of being the first ever try scorer for the Eastern Suburbs club. He was a member of the Eastern Suburbs side that was defeated by South Sydney in the first ever NSWRL premiership decider.

Smith moved to the Balmain club the following year before returning to the Eastern Suburbs club for the 1912 season, the year the club won its second premiership.
