= Herbert Woodhill =

Australian rugby league footballer & RL referee

Herbert Stanley Woodhill
Personal information
- Born: 3 February 1875
- Died: 6 July 1953 (aged 78)

Playing information
- Position: Fullback
Club
Years	Team	Pld	T	G	FG	P
1908	Eastern Suburbs	1	0	0	0	0

Refereeing information
Years	Competition	Apps
	New South Wales Rugby Football League
- Military career
- Allegiance: Australia
- Branch: Australian Army
- Service years: 1899-1902
- Unit: New South Wales Mounted Rifles
- Conflicts: Second Boer War

Herbert Stanley Woodhill (1875–1963) was an Australian rugby league footballer who played in New South Wales Rugby League (NSWRL) competition. He was a fullback, from the Paddington rugby juniors in the 1890s and was a first grade Rugby player for Eastern Suburbs in the 1900s before switching codes.

Woodhill played for the Eastern Suburbs club in rugby league's founding season of 1908. After retiring from his playing career, he became a rugby league referee. He was also a veteran of the Boer War, serving with the N.S.W. Mounted Rifles between 1899 and 1902.
