= Percy McNamara =

Australian rugby league footballer

Personal information
- Full name: Percy Vernon John McNamara
- Born: 1870 Sydney, New South Wales, Australia
- Died: 1940 (aged 69–70) Sydney, New South Wales, Australia

Playing information
- Position: Fullback, Wing, Centre
Club
Years	Team	Pld	T	G	FG	P
1908–09	Eastern Suburbs	15	2	0	1	8
- Source: As of 14 February 2019

Percy Vernon John McNamara (1870–1940) was a pioneer rugby league footballer in the New South Wales Rugby Football League premiership. He was also a noted rugby union player, initially with Randwick DRUFC, and later with the 'Pirates', who won state wide fame, and also represented New South Wales against New Zealand (in 1897) and Victoria before switching codes. He played with the Eastern Suburbs club in the codes inaugural season - 1908, as a 38-year-old.

== Playing career ==
Known as "Percy Mac", he was an outside back and played in the NSWRL's first premiership final. The match was played between Eastern suburbs and South Sydney resulting in a 14–12 victory to Souths. McNamara kicked a field goal in the deciding match.

McNamara played 9 matches for the Eastern Suburbs club in the years (1908–09), he scored 21 points - 3 tries and kicked 6 goals. He was also a Cricketer with Waverley and Australian Rules Player.

== Death ==
A press article from 1935 noted that he suffered severe injuries from slipping on a banana peel on a Sydney Street. His funeral was held on 8 October 1940 and he was cremated at Northern Suburbs Crematorium.
