= Bob Mable =

Australian rugby union and rugby league footballer

Personal information
- Full name: Robert Emanuel Mable
- Born: 4 January 1885; London, England
- Died: 8 September 1960 (aged 75)

Playing information
- Position: Lock, Hooker, Prop
Club
Years	Team	Pld	T	G	FG	P
1908–13	Eastern Suburbs	27	2	0	0	6
Representative
Years	Team	Pld	T	G	FG	P
1907–08	New South Wales	4	0	0	0	0
- Source: As of 14 February 2019

Robert Emanuel Mable (1885–1960) was a pioneer rugby league footballer who played in the New South Wales Rugby League (NSWRL) competition.

== Career ==
Mable played for the Eastern Suburbs club in the years 1908 to 1910. A forward, Mable played for New South Wales in the very first rugby match run by the newly created 'New South Wales Rugby Football League' which had just split away from the established New South Wales Rugby Football Union.

Mable was a member of the rebel sides that played against the New Zealand 'All Golds' in 1907, and was later awarded life membership in the New South Wales Rugby League for the role that he played in the series that was instrumental in the birth of rugby league in Australia. He played in Sydney's Eastern Suburbs club's first match and the NSWRL's first premiership decider.

Mable was awarded Life Membership of the New South Wales Rugby League in 1914 for his early participation in the game's inception in Australia. He is also recognized as the 8th player to play for Eastern Suburbs Club.

He died on 8 September 1960.
