= Tom Golden =

Australian rugby league footballer

Personal information
- Full name: Thomas Golden
- Born: 28 October 1881 Concord, New South Wales, Australia
- Died: 3 September 1952 (aged 70) Sydney, New South Wales, Australia

Playing information
- Position: Lock, Second-row
Club
Years	Team	Pld	T	G	FG	P
1908–09	South Sydney	7	2	0	0	6

Thomas Golden (1881–1952) was a pioneer Australian rugby league footballer who played in the 1900s.

== Playing career ==
Golden came from South Sydney's rugby union ranks to convert to the new game of rugby league in 1908. He played in the first South Sydney premiership team in 1908 and played the following season before retiring. He also represented a combined firsts Sydney team that played a match in 1909.

== Death ==
A Surry Hills, New South Wales local for his entire life, Golden died at St. Vincent's Hospital on 3 September 1952, aged 70.
