= William Leslie (rugby league) =

Australian rugby league footballer

Personal information
- Born: 17 September 1879; Sydney, New South Wales, Australia
- Died: 17 May 1952 (aged 72)

Playing information
- Position: Second-row
Club
Years	Team	Pld	T	G	FG	P
1908	Eastern Suburbs	1	0	0	0	0

William Leslie (Sydney, Australia) was a rugby league footballer in the New South Wales Rugby League (NSWRL)'s foundation season of 1908.

Leslie played for the Eastern Suburbs club.
