= George Hooker (rugby league) =

New Zealand rugby league footballer

George "Babe" Hooker was an Australian professional rugby league footballer who played in the 1900s. He played in the New South Wales Rugby League (NSWRL).

Hooker played for the Eastern Suburbs club in the 1909 season.
