= Jersey Flegg =

Australian rugby league footballer and administrator

Personal information
- Full name: Henry Flegg
- Born: 6 April 1878 Bolton, Lancashire, England
- Died: 23 August 1960 (aged 82) North Sydney, New South Wales, Australia

Playing information
- Position: Prop
Club
Years	Team	Pld	T	G	FG	P
1908–09	Eastern Suburbs	14	3	0	0	9

Harry "Jersey" Flegg (6 April 1878 in Bolton, Lancashire – 23 August 1960 in North Sydney, New South Wales) was an English-Australian rugby league footballer and administrator, who was a leading figure in the birth of the sport in Australia.

Flegg emigrated to Australia at an early age. He received his nickname 'Jersey' while still at school, after a meeting with the New South Wales (NSW) Governor of the time, Lord Jersey, who had bright red hair, similar to his own.

== Playing career ==
Flegg played rugby football for the Adelphi club and represented New South Wales in the sport before moving to the new rebel code in rugby league's start up season – 1908.

Flegg played a leading role in the establishment of the Eastern Suburbs club, he chaired the founding meeting, and was one of that club's two delegates to the New South Wales Rugby Football League (NSWRFL) as well as being a club selector. A front row forward with a reputation as a solid defender, he captained the side in its inaugural season, including the club's first match and the NSWRFL's first premiership decider against neighbouring Sydney club and traditional rival, South Sydney. Flegg was also selected in a Sydney-based representative team during that first season. However, it is in administration that he is best remembered.

== Administrative career ==
In 1909, Flegg was made a New South Wales and Australian selector and in 1929 he was appointed to the position of president of the NSWRFL. In 1941 he became chairman of the Australian Rugby League Board of Control. At the time of his death in 1960, aged 82, he was still serving in these roles.

A life member of the Australian, British and French Rugby Leagues, Flegg received further recognition when in 1961 the H. Jersey Flegg Cup was introduced. His contribution to rugby league extended over half a century and during his tenure at the head of the game's administration, rugby league prospered, cementing itself as the dominant football code throughout the Australian states of New South Wales and Queensland.

Flegg has been allocated Eastern Suburbs player Number 1.
