= Dick Green (rugby league) =

Australian rugby league footballer

Personal information
- Full name: Richard Green

Playing information
- Position: Prop, Second-row, Hooker
Club
Years	Team	Pld	T	G	FG	P
1908–09	South Sydney	21	7	16	0	53
1911	Annandale	5	0	5	0	10
1912	South Sydney	6	0	0	0	0
	Total	32	7	21	0	63
Representative
Years	Team	Pld	T	G	FG	P
1908–09	New South Wales	2	0	0	0	0

Dick Green was an Australian rugby league footballer who played in the 1900s and 1910s. He played for South Sydney and Annandale in the New South Wales Rugby League (NSWRL) competition. Green was a foundation player for South Sydney being a part of the club's first ever season and playing in their first ever game.

== Playing career ==
Green played in South Sydney's first ever game against North Sydney in the opening week of the NSWRL competition. South Sydney defeated Norths 11–7 at Birchgrove Oval with Green scoring one of the club's first tries.

Souths went on to claim the inaugural minor premiership in 1908 and reach the first NSWRL grand final against Eastern Suburbs. Green played at prop as Souths claimed their first premiership winning 14–12 at the Royal Agricultural Society Grounds in front of 4000 spectators.

In 1909, Green played 10 times for the club as Souths claimed their second premiership in a row against Balmain in controversial circumstances.

Green did not make an appearances for Souths in 1910 spending the whole season playing with the South Sydney Federals. In 1911, Green joined Annandale and spent one season at the club before returning to South Sydney. Green retired at the end of 1912.
