= Dave Brown (rugby, born 1886) =

Australian rugby union and rugby league footballer

Personal information
- Full name: David Joseph Brown
- Born: 13 May 1886
- Died: 24 December 1910 (aged 24)

Playing information
- Position: Centre, Five-eighth
Club
Years	Team	Pld	T	G	FG	P
1908–10	Eastern Suburbs	21	2	0	0	6
Representative
Years	Team	Pld	T	G	FG	P
1907–09	New South Wales	9	2	0	0	6
1909	Australia	3	0	0	0	0

David Joseph Brown (13 May 1886 – 24 December 1910) was a pioneer of rugby league football in Australia.

He played in the opening three seasons of the new sport for Eastern Suburbs, 1908, 1909 and 1910.

Primarily a centre, Brown made most of his appearances for the East's club during the 1908 and 1909 seasons, including the NSWRL's first match and first premiership decider. He played one match in 1910 before retiring.

In the 1909, season Brown represented Australia in a match against a touring New Zealand Māori side that season Brown also appeared in several non-sanctioned matches between a rugby league's side known as the 'Kangaroos' and a rugby union side known as 'Wallabies'.

Like so many rugby league players of that time Brown was a rugby union footballer, in 1907 he took part in the rebel series against the New Zealand 'All Golds' that helped to launch rugby league in Australia. In its appreciation, the NSWRL awarded Brown life membership in 1914.

On Christmas Eve 1910, while working as a railway porter, he suffered serious injuries after being hit by a train while attending to some signal lamps. He was admitted to hospital, but died a few hours later.
