= Fred Jarman =

Australian rugby league footballer

Personal information
- Full name: Frank Jarman

Playing information
- Position: Wing, Centre
Club
Years	Team	Pld	T	G	FG	P
1908	South Sydney	9	2	0	0	6

Fred Jarman also known as "Frank Jarman" was an Australian rugby league footballer who played in the 1900s. He played for South Sydney in the New South Wales Rugby League (NSWRL) competition. Jarman was a foundation player for South Sydney playing in the club's first ever game.

== Playing career ==
Jarman made his first grade debut for Souths against North Sydney at Birchgrove Oval in Round 1 1908 which was the opening week of the NSWRL competition in Australia. Souths won the match 11–7 with Jarman playing on the wing.

Souths went on to claim the inaugural minor premiership in 1908 and reach the first NSWRL grand final against rivals Eastern Suburbs. Jarman played at centre as Souths claimed their first premiership winning 14–12 at the Royal Agricultural Society Grounds in front of 4000 spectators. Jarman then departed the club after playing only the one season and never played first grade again.
