= Arthur Lawes =

Australian rugby league footballer

Arthur Lawes was a professional rugby league footballer in the Australian New South Wales Rugby League competition. Lawes played for the Eastern Suburbs club, playing 4 matches in the year 1909.
