= Jim Stack (rugby league) =

Australian rugby league footballer

Personal information
- Full name: James Patrick Stack
- Born: 24 February 1880 Yass, New South Wales, Australia
- Died: 21 July 1970 (aged 90)

Playing information
- Position: Hooker, Second-row
Club
Years	Team	Pld	T	G	FG	P
1908–11	Western Suburbs	12	3	0	0	9
- Source: As of 16 October 2025

James Patrick Stack was an Australian rugby league footballer who played in the 1900s and 1910s. He played for Western Suburbs in the New South Wales Rugby League (NSWRL) competition. Stack was a foundation player for Western Suburbs and the club's inaugural captain.

== Playing career ==
Stack made his first grade debut for Western Suburbs against Balmain in Round 1 1908 at Birchgrove Oval which was also the opening week of the New South Wales Rugby League (NSWRL) competition in Australia.

Stack had the honour of being the club's first captain. Balmain would go on to win the match 24–0. Stack played in Western Suburbs first ever victory against Newtown in Round 9 1908 at Wentworth Park which ended with a score of 6–5. Stack scored one of Western Suburbs two tries in the game. The win would be Western Suburbs only victory of the season and the club finished second last on the table above last placed Cumberland who were dissolved at the conclusion of the season.

Western Suburbs would go on to finish last in 1909 and 1910. Wests nearly finished last in 1911 but finished just above Balmain on the ladder. Stack's last game for Wests was against Balmain in Round 10 1911 which Western Suburbs won 21–11 at Birchgrove Oval.
