= Leo Senior =

Australian rugby league footballer (1887-1975)

Personal information
- Full name: Leo Gladstone Senior
- Born: 4 October 1887 Inverell, New South Wales, Australia
- Died: 30 November 1975 (aged 88) Nedlands, Western Australia, Australia

Playing information
- Position: Wing, Centre
Club
Years	Team	Pld	T	G	FG	P
1908	South Sydney	4	3	0	0	9

Leo Senior (1887−1975) was an Australian rugby league footballer who played in the 1900s. He played four matches for South Sydney in the New South Wales Rugby League Premiership in his career and scored three tries in the same year. He is most credited for scoring the first try in an NSWRL/NRL Grand Final in the inaugural NSWRL Final in 1908. His try strike rate was 0.75 (3 from 4 top grade appearances) one of the highest in the league's inaugural season.

== Career statistics ==
Games:4

Tries:3

Goals:0

Field Goals:0

Position:Wing

Premierships:1
