= Arthur McCallum =

NZ rugby league footballer

Personal information
- Full name: Alexander Henry McCallum
- Born: 29 August 1879; New Zealand
- Died: 5 June 1972 (aged 92)

Playing information
- Position: Second-row, Hooker
Club
Years	Team	Pld	T	G	FG	P
1908	South Sydney	2	0	0	0	0
1909	Western Suburbs	1	0	0	0	0
	Total	3	0	0	0	0

Arthur McCallum was a New Zealand rugby league footballer who played in the 1900s and 1910s. He played for South Sydney and Western Suburbs in the New South Wales Rugby League (NSWRL) competition. McCallum was a foundation player for South Sydney.

== Playing career ==
McCallum made his first grade debut for South Sydney against Glebe in the 1908 semi final which Souths won 16–3 at Wentworth Park.

Souths went on to reach the first NSWRL grand final against rivals Eastern Suburbs. McCallum played in the match as Souths claimed their first premiership winning 14–12 at the Royal Agricultural Society Grounds in front of 4000 spectators.

In 1909, McCallum joined Western Suburbs and played one game for the club, a 7–3 victory over North Sydney in Round 8 1909. McCallum then rejoined South Sydney midway through the 1909 season but only managed to play reserve grade for the club before retiring at the end of 1910.
