= Tom Bruce (rugby league) =

Australian rugby league footballer

Personal information
- Full name: Thomas Fraser Bruce
- Born: 19 April 1885 Braidwood, New South Wales
- Died: 12 October 1917 (aged 32) Passchendaele salient, Belgium

Playing information
- Position: Halfback
Club
Years	Team	Pld	T	G	FG	P
1909–12	Eastern Suburbs	29	3	0	0	9
- Source: Whiticker
- Military career
- Allegiance: Australia
- Branch: Australian Army
- Service years: 1916-1917
- Rank: 2nd lieutenant
- Unit: Australian 36th Infantry Battalion
- Conflicts: World War I; Battle of Messines; First Battle of Passchendaele †

Thomas Fraser Bruce (1885 – 12 October 1917) was an Australian rugby league footballer in the New South Wales Rugby League competition and an Australian Imperial Forces (AIF) officer who fell in World War I at the Battle of Passchendale.

== Early life and football career ==
Born in Braidwood, New South Wales to parents Robert and Margaret Bruce, the family relocated to Sydney. His mother later lived in the Sydney suburb of Kensington. He lived at 28 Yurong Street with his wife Marry Maud and worked as a tram conductor.

A halfback, Bruce played in nineteen matches for the Eastern Suburbs club in the years 1909-1912 alongside Dally Messenger. He was the 28th player for the Eastern Suburbs club. He is listed in the Easts playing squad from 1909 through till 1913, although Leslie Cody kept him out of the half-back spot in East's first premiership winning side in 1911. By 1912 the champion representative half-back Pony Halloway had joined the Tricolours and Bruce saw little first grade football in 1912 and none in 1913.

== War service ==
Bruce was a thirty-two-year-old married tram conductor with two adopted children living in Yurong St, near Hyde Park, Sydney when he enlisted in the AIF in March 1916. He was at that point active in the Home Service and had contributed as a camp-cook. Enlisted to the Australian 36th Infantry Battalion he rose from private to corporal with three months, and to sergeant six months later. He was wounded in action in Belgium at the Battle of Messines in June 1917 and rejoined his unit in August 1917 at which point he was promoted to 2nd lieutenant, less than eighteen months after enlistment . He was killed in action, early in the first day of the First Battle of Passchendaele in Belgium on 12 October 1917 after establishing a forward command post aged 32 years. He was one of fifteen officers of the 36th Bttn killed at 1st Passchendaele.

He was survived by his children William and Mary and his wife May Maud Bruce. He has no known grave but is commemorated on panel 25 of the Menin Gate memorial.

Unarguably perplexing is the military record at the AIF Project of a Thomas John Bruce born in 1898 whose father was the same Thomas Fraser Bruce of 28 Yurong St, Hyde Park. The private TJ Bruce served in a different unit to his father and survived the war. This would have made the older Thomas fourteen years of age when his son Thomas John was born. Perhaps one, or both Thomas Bruce was lying about his age at enlistment.
