= Joe Shakespeare =

Australian rugby league footballer

Joe Shakespeare (1883–1935) was a rugby league footballer in the New South Wales Rugby League (NSWRL)'s foundation season of 1908.

Joseph Shakespear played for the Eastern Suburbs club. He was also a boxing promoter, referee, and an Alderman at Cessnock, New South Wales.
