= Ted Briscoe =

Australian rugby league footballer

Ted Briscoe was a rugby league footballer in the New South Wales Rugby Football League premiership's inaugural season – 1908.

Briscoe, who played for the Eastern Suburbs club, was a forward in rugby league's first premiership decider.

Ted Briscoe is remembered as the Sydney Roosters 27th player. He played two season for Easts in 1908–1909.
