= Arthur Surridge =

Australian rugby league footballer

Personal information
- Full name: Arthur Surridge
- Born: 2 June 1884 Sydney, New South Wales, Australia
- Died: 2 August 1963 (aged 79) Sydney, New South Wales, Australia

Playing information
- Position: Lock, Second-row, Wing
Club
Years	Team	Pld	T	G	FG	P
1909	Eastern Suburbs	8	3	15	1	41
1910	Balmain	4	1	5	0	13
	Total	12	4	20	1	54
Representative
Years	Team	Pld	T	G	FG	P
1909	New South Wales	4	3	4	0	17
- Source: As of 14 February 2019

Arthur 'Wicker' Surridge (1884–1963) was a rugby league footballer in the Australian competition the New South Wales Rugby Football League premiership between 1909 and 1910.

== Playing career ==
An Easts rugby junior, Surridge grew up at Paddington, New South Wales and played for the Eastern Suburbs club in the 1909 NSWRFL season. A forward, Surridge was an accomplished goal kicker, playing in 9 matches for the Tricolours, including that year's semifinal loss to Balmain in which he was a try scorer.

Surridge represented the New South Wales rugby league team on four occasions in 1909. He is noted as the 31st Eastern Suburbs player. He joined Balmain for the 1910 NSWRFL season.

Surridge was a well-known police detective in Sydney and held numerous positions with the Eastern Suburbs club over many years. He died on 2 August 1963, aged 79 years.
