= Horrie Miller (rugby league) =

Australian rugby league footballer and administrator

Personal information
- Full name: Horace Richard Miller
- Born: 17 July 1882; Sydney, New South Wales, Australia
- Died: 11 January 1967 (aged 84); Woollahra, New South Wales

Playing information
- Position: Wing
Club
Years	Team	Pld	T	G	FG	P
1908–09	Eastern Suburbs	12	15	3	0	51
Representative
Years	Team	Pld	T	G	FG	P
1908	Metropolis	1	1	0	0	3

Horace Miller (1882–1967) was an Australian rugby league footballer in the New South Wales Rugby Football League premiership. He played as a wing with the Eastern Suburbs club in 1908 and 1909, the first years of the new code.

== Playing career ==
Miller was a champion runner who was rated the fastest runner in the league's inaugural season. He headed the League's try-scoring list in that first season – he scored a hat trick of tries in that year's semi-final and followed that up with a further two in the final. Miller shares a record with Hamiso Tabuai-Fidow for the longest streak of tries scored at the beginning of their team's inaugural season, having scored at least one try in each of Eastern Suburbs' first six games. He was also the League's top point scorer in season 1908. His only representative match came in that first year when he was selected to represent Sydney in a match against a touring New Zealand Maori side.

== Post playing ==
The wing three-quarter also served as Eastern Suburbs secretary in the club's first season. In addition, that year Miller was appointed secretary of the New South Wales Rugby Football League on a temporary basis, following the dismissal of J J Giltinan. The position became permanent in 1914 and Miller served in that role until 1946. He was awarded Life Membership of the New South Wales Rugby League in 1914.

During the 1948 season, the former league secretary unsuccessfully attempted to establish a rebel night competition.

Miller is remembered as the Sydney Roosters 15th player.

Miller is credited with coining the phrase "The Greatest Game of All".

Preceded by	Inaugural Record-holder; Most points in an NSWRFL career 1908 (47) – 1909 (56)	Succeeded by Arthur Conlin (1910)
