= Albert Broomham =

Australian rugby league footballer

Personal information
- Full name: Albert Frederick Broomham
- Born: 15 July 1885 St. Leonards, New South Wales, Australia
- Died: 23 December 1948 (aged 63) Willoughby, New South Wales, Australia

Playing information
- Position: Centre
Club
| Years | Team | Pld | T | G | FG | P |
|---|---|---|---|---|---|---|
| 1908–14 | North Sydney | 67 | 33 | 0 | 0 | 99 |
Representative
| Years | Team | Pld | T | G | FG | P |
| 1908–13 | New South Wales | 26 | 30 | 0 | 0 | 90 |
| 1909–11 | Australia | 5 | 1 | 0 | 0 | 3 |
| 1908–12 | Metropolis | 3 | 6 | 0 | 0 | 18 |

Albert Frederick Broomham (1885–1948) was a pioneer Australian rugby league footballer who played in the 1900s and 1910s. He represented New South Wales and Australia.

== Background ==
Broomham was born in St. Leonards, New South Wales, in 1885.

== Playing career ==
Broomham was a Norths rugby union convert who joined the North Sydney rugby league club at the new code's foundation in 1908 as a wing three-quarter.

Broomham played seven seasons with the North Sydney club between 1908 and 1914. He missed the first Kangaroo Tour after making his State debut in 1908. He then toured New Zealand and played three Tests with the Kangaroos in 1909, and then played two Tests against England in 1910. He again toured with the 1911–12 Kangaroo tour of Great Britain where he made his final Test appearance in the first Test against England. Broomham is listed on the Australian Players Register as Kangaroo No.40.

Broomham retired after the 1914 NSWRFL season.

Broomham's representative career in detail:

Australia v's England 1910; Australia v's Maoris 1909; Australia v's New Zealand 1909; Metropoli s(Sydney) v's New Zealand 1909; Metropolis V's Queensland 1908; Australasia v's England 1910; Australasia v's England 1911; Kangaroos v's England in Sydney 1910; Kangaroos v's Rest of N.S.W. 1909; Kangaroos v's Wallabies 1909; N.S.W. v's England 1910; N.S.W. v's Maoris 1908; N.S.W. v's New Zealand 1911,1912,1913; N.S.W. v's Queensland 1910,1911,1912.

All up, Broomham represented Australia in five Tests, Australasia in 2 Tests, New South Wales on 26 occasions and Metropolis (Sydney) on three occasions.

One of Australia's great rugby league pioneers, Broomham died on 23 December 1948, aged 63.
