= Harold Kelley (rugby league) =

Australian rugby league footballer

Personal information
- Full name: Harold Percival Sidney Kelley
- Born: 2 January 1880; Sydney, New South Wales, Australia
- Died: 7 July 1948 (aged 68); Sydney, New South Wales, Australia

Playing information
- Position: Five-eighth
Club
Years	Team	Pld	T	G	FG	P
1908–10	Eastern Suburbs	17	2	1	0	8

Harold Percival Sidney Kelley (1880-1948) was a rugby league footballer in the New South Wales Rugby Football League premiership in rugby league's founding season in Australia.

Kelley played for the Eastern Suburbs club in the years 1908 and 1909. A five-eighth Kelley played in the NSWRL's first premiership decider.

Kelley is remembered as the Sydney Roosters 17th player.
