= Bill King (Australian rugby league) =

New Zealand rugby league footballer

Personal information
- Full name: William Henry King

Playing information
- Position: Fullback
Club
Years	Team	Pld	T	G	FG	P
1908–10	Eastern Suburbs	25	0	18	1	38
1912	North Sydney	1	0	0	0	0
	Total	26	0	18	1	38
Representative
Years	Team	Pld	T	G	FG	P
1919	New Zealand	1	0	0	0	0
1910	New South Wales	1	0	0	0	0
- Source: As of 13 February 2019

William ‘Bill’ King was an Australian rugby league footballer in the New South Wales Rugby Football League's foundation season of 1908.

== Playing career ==
A fullback, King played for Eastern Suburbs club before joining the North Sydney club in 1912.

King was a member of the Eastern Suburbs side that played against South Sydney in rugby league's first premiership decider.

King is remembered as the Sydney Roosters 26th player.
