= Harry Butler (rugby league) =

Australian rugby league footballer

Personal information
- Full name: Harold William Butler
- Born: 23 April 1887; Redfern, New South Wales, Australia
- Died: 21 April 1965 (aged 77); Redfern, New South Wales, Australia

Playing information
- Position: Prop, Hooker, Second-row, Lock
Club
Years	Team	Pld	T	G	FG	P
1908–15	South Sydney	96	16	8	0	64
Representative
Years	Team	Pld	T	G	FG	P
1913	New South Wales	5	0	0	0	0

Harry Butler (1887–1965) was a pioneer Australian rugby league footballer who played in the 1900s and 1910s. A New South Wales representative, Butler played for South Sydney in the New South Wales Rugby League (NSWRL) competition, as a lock.

== Playing career ==
Butler began his career for Souths in the first ever season of the NSWRL competition and played in South Sydney's first ever game as a club when they played against North Sydney at Birchgrove Oval. Butler was a member of Souths first ever premiership winning team defeating Eastern Suburbs 14–12 at the Royal Agricultural Showground. The following year, Butler won his second premiership as a Souths player when South Sydney won the grand final against Balmain by default. Souths were due to play Balmain but the club boycotted the match. South Sydney attended the game, kicked off to an invisible opposition, scored a try and were declared premiers. In 1910, Butler played in the 1910 grand final draw against Newtown which ended 4-4. Newtown won the premiership due to them finishing as minor premiers in the regular season. Butler played a further five seasons for the club and retired at the end of 1915.
