= Lou Jones (rugby league) =

Australia international rugby league footballer

Personal information
- Full name: Louis Sydney Jones
- Born: 4 August 1884 Sydney, New South Wales, Australia
- Died: 1 November 1924 (aged 40) Kings Cross, New South Wales, Australia

Playing information
- Position: Second-row, Hooker, Prop
Club
Years	Team	Pld	T	G	FG	P
1908	Eastern Suburbs	11	1	6	0	15
Representative
Years	Team	Pld	T	G	FG	P
1908	New South Wales	4	0	0	0	0
1908	Australia	2	1	0	0	3
- Source: As of 14 February 2019

Lou 'Baby' Jones (1884–1924) was a pioneer rugby league footballer in the Australian competition - the New South Wales Rugby League (NSWRL) premiership.

== Playing career ==
A forward, Jones played two seasons for the Eastern Suburbs club in the years 1908–1909. Jones played in Eastern Suburbs first match, and, although a reserve, is recognised as one of the first Australian representatives to come from the Eastern Suburbs club which included Dally Messenger.

Jones, who played in two test matches for Kangaroo's, was the scorer of the winning try in Australia,'s first test match victory. Jones also went on the first 'Kangaroo tour', although not playing in any of the tests, he did play in five tour matches against English county sides. Jones has the distinction of representing Eastern Suburbs, New South Wales and Australia in their first matches, scored the winning try in Australia's first test match victory against New Zealand as well as going away on the first 'Kangaroo Tour'. He is listed on the Australian Players Register as Kangaroo No. 22.

The forward is recognised as the 7th player to play for Eastern Suburbs.

== Death ==
Jones died under tragic circumstances at his residence in Bayswater Road, Kings Cross on Saturday 1 November 1924. He was found dead in the street after falling from an upper story window. He apparently cut his throat before the fall. He was suffering from ill health prior to his suicide. He was a popular man whose death was mourned by many within the Rugby League community and after a large funeral, he was buried at Rookwood Cemetery on 3 November 1924.
