= Mick Frawley =

Australian rugby league footballer

Personal information
- Full name: Michael P Frawley
- Born: 9 August 1885 Woollahra, New South Wales
- Died: 16 June 1919 (aged 33) Sydney, New South Wales

Playing information
- Position: Second-row, Hooker, Lock
Club
Years	Team	Pld	T	G	FG	P
1908–12	Eastern Suburbs	44	14	1	0	44
Representative
Years	Team	Pld	T	G	FG	P
1909	New South Wales	2	1	0	0	3
1909	Australia	1	0	0	0	0
1909–11	Metropolis	2	1	0	0	3
- Military career
- Allegiance: Australia
- Branch: Australian Army
- Service years: 1916-1918
- Rank: Sergeant
- Unit: 4th Battalion
- Conflicts: World War I; Western Front

Michael Frawley (1885–1919) was a pioneer Australian rugby league footballer who played for the Eastern Suburbs club in the New South Wales Rugby Football League premiership.

== Club career ==
Mick Frawley was born in Woollahra, New South Wales in 1885, and was an Eastern Suburbs rugby union junior. A second-row forward, Mick Frawley was a member of Eastern Suburbs' first premiership decider in rugby league's foundation season of 1908. In 1911, Frawley was a member of Easts first premiership winning side. He played his last game for the club in 1912 and retired after sustaining an injury. He played for the Roosters for five seasons, and played 44 first grade games with the club. He is listed on the Sydney Roosters Playing Register as player No. 25.

== Representative career ==
His sole national representative appearance was in the 1909 first Test loss against New Zealand. Frawley was overlooked for the second Test of the series. Frawley is listed on the Australian Players Register as Kangaroo No. 19.

== Military service and death ==
Frawley served with the 1st Australian Imperial Force in on the Western Front during World War I. He embarked from Sydney in 1916 on HMAT A15 Star of England as a Sergeant with the 15th reinforcement for the 4th Battalion. He survived his war service but died of influenza on 16 June 1919 on his return to Sydney aged 33. Mick Frawley was buried at Waverley Cemetery the following day.

== Sources ==
- Andrews, Malcolm (2006) The ABC of Rugby League Austn Broadcasting Corpn, Sydney
- Whiticker, Alan & Hudson, Glen (2006) The Encyclopedia of Rugby League Players, Gavin Allen Publishing, Sydney
- Haddan, Steve (2007) The Finals - 100 Years of National Rugby League Finals, Steve Haddan Publishing, Brisbane
- Australian Light Horse Studies Centre His Majesty's Australian Transports HMAT Ships, Transporting the 1st AIF.

== Online ==
- Mick Frawley at the AIF Project
