= William Neill (rugby league) =

Australia international rugby league footballer

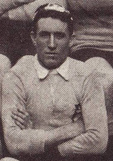

Personal information
- Full name: William Gladstone Neill
- Born: 21 June 1884 Paddington, New South Wales, Australia
- Died: 19 March 1964 (aged 79) Bexley, New South Wales, Australia

Playing information
- Position: Fullback
Club
Years	Team	Pld	T	G	FG	P
1908–09	South Sydney	18	0	0	0	0
1910–13	Newtown	24	0	0	0	0
1914	Glebe	2	0	0	0	0
	Total	44	0	0	0	0
Representative
Years	Team	Pld	T	G	FG	P
1909–11	Australia	4	0	0	0	0
1910–11	New South Wales	11	0	0	0	0

William "Webby" Neill (21 June 1884 – 19 March 1964) was a pioneer Australian rugby league footballer who played in the 1900s and 1910s, who later became a leading referee in the New South Wales Rugby Football League.

== Playing career ==
Neill played for South Sydney in the first ever NSWRFL premiership season in 1908 and that year went on to play in the first ever Grand final, which his team won. The following season Souths also won the premiership and he was first selected for the Australian national side that year. Neill moved to Newtown the following season, playing in their 1910 NSWRFL season grand final-winning team to make it three premierships in three years. The following year he was selected to go on the 1911–12 Kangaroo tour of Great Britain, the second-ever. He played for another three seasons at Newtown before a final season with Glebe.

== Post playing ==
Neill later took to refereeing in the NSWRFL. He oversaw matches in a long refereeing career from 1916 to 1932 and officiated in a number of Grand finals in that time. Also, during the 1932 Great Britain Lions tour Neil refereed the first Ashes Test.

He was awarded Life Membership of the New South Wales Rugby League in 1931.

Neill is listed on the Australian Players Register as Kangaroo No. 50
