= Field goal (rugby) =

Obsolete scoring method in rugby football

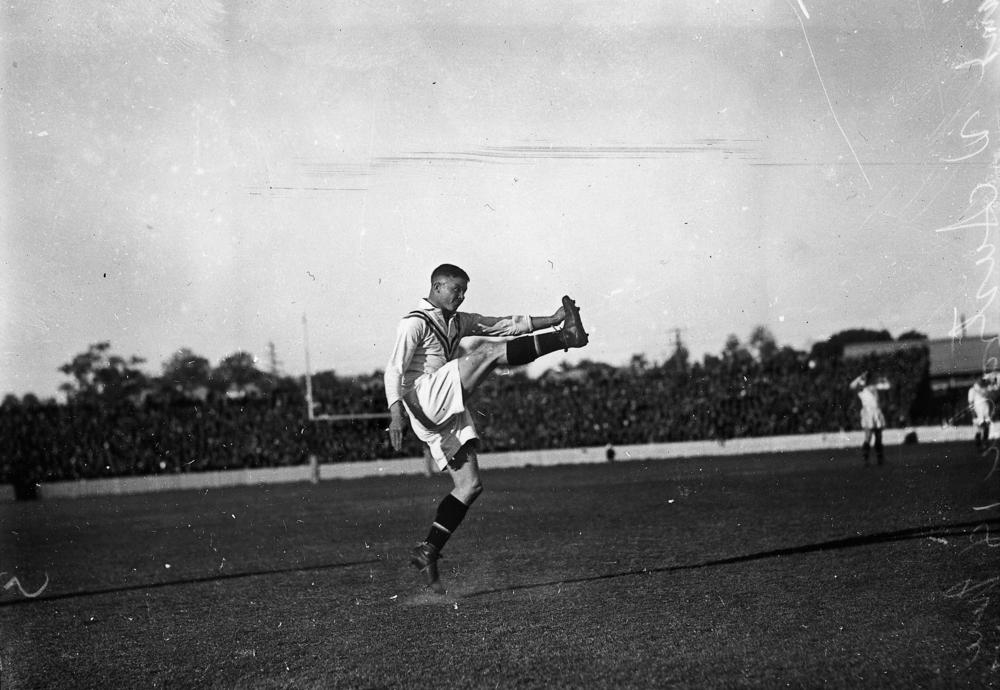
Jim Sullivan kicking for Great Britain, in a rugby league match against Australia in 1933.

A field goal, also called a flying kick or speculator, was a way of scoring in the game of rugby football. It consisted of a player kicking the ball from the ground (not on a kicking tee) without using their hands in open play over the crossbar. This method of scoring was abolished in rugby union in 1905 and in rugby league in 1950.

== Rugby union ==
During the development of rugby football, the field goal was considered a legitimate way of scoring. In 1845, place kicks were the only way to score a goal. In 1871, it was clarified under Law 6 that kicking the ball through the posts from the ground in open play was a valid method of scoring a goal. A rejected proposal in 1882 by the Rugby Football Union suggested that field goals, referred to as a "flying kick", would be worth 4 points, the same value as a try. It was eventually formalised in 1891 by the International Rugby Football Board that field goals (classed as any other goals) would be worth 4 points.

While lawful, the option nonetheless remained extremely rare. In representative level contests in Australasia just two such goals have been recorded. In 1888 a field goal was kicked in Dunedin in New Zealand in a match against the touring British Lions. The second and seemingly last such goal came in Australia in 1894 at the Sydney Cricket Ground for Queensland against New South Wales.

In 1905 both the IRFB and Rugby Football Union (RFU) abolished the field goal as a valid method of scoring.

== Rugby league ==
When the Northern Rugby Football Union broke away from the RFU in 1895 it adopted the rugby union playing laws as in force at that time. While the RFU abolished the field goal in rugby union in 1905, rugby league retained it. However, there was criticism about it on the 1908–09 Australia rugby league tour of Britain, whereby the Australia national rugby league team player Dally Messenger continuously and recklessly attempted field goals during a match against the England national rugby league team.. A writer for the Daily Chronicle stated: "I do not believe in the speculator at any time, it is bad rugby football", and expressed concern that Dally would either injure himself or others. As predicted, during a later match against St. Helens, he damaged the cartilage in his knee due to repeated attempts at the scoring move.

The last and only know such goal in what today is recognised as the National Rugby League (NRL) was scored on 20 May 1911 by John Campbell for Eastern Suburbs (now Sydney Roosters) against Newtown at the Sydney Sports Ground.

The Northern Rugby Football League, considered the guardian of the rules of rugby league at the time, kept the method in the rulebook until finally abolishing it until 1950. By April 1951 the various league bodies in Australia followed and made the same amendment outlawing the field goal.

In rugby league, particularly in Australia, the term field goal is used as a synonym for drop goal.
