= Sydney Showground (Moore Park) =

Former showground in Sydney, New South Wales

Former Sydney Showground
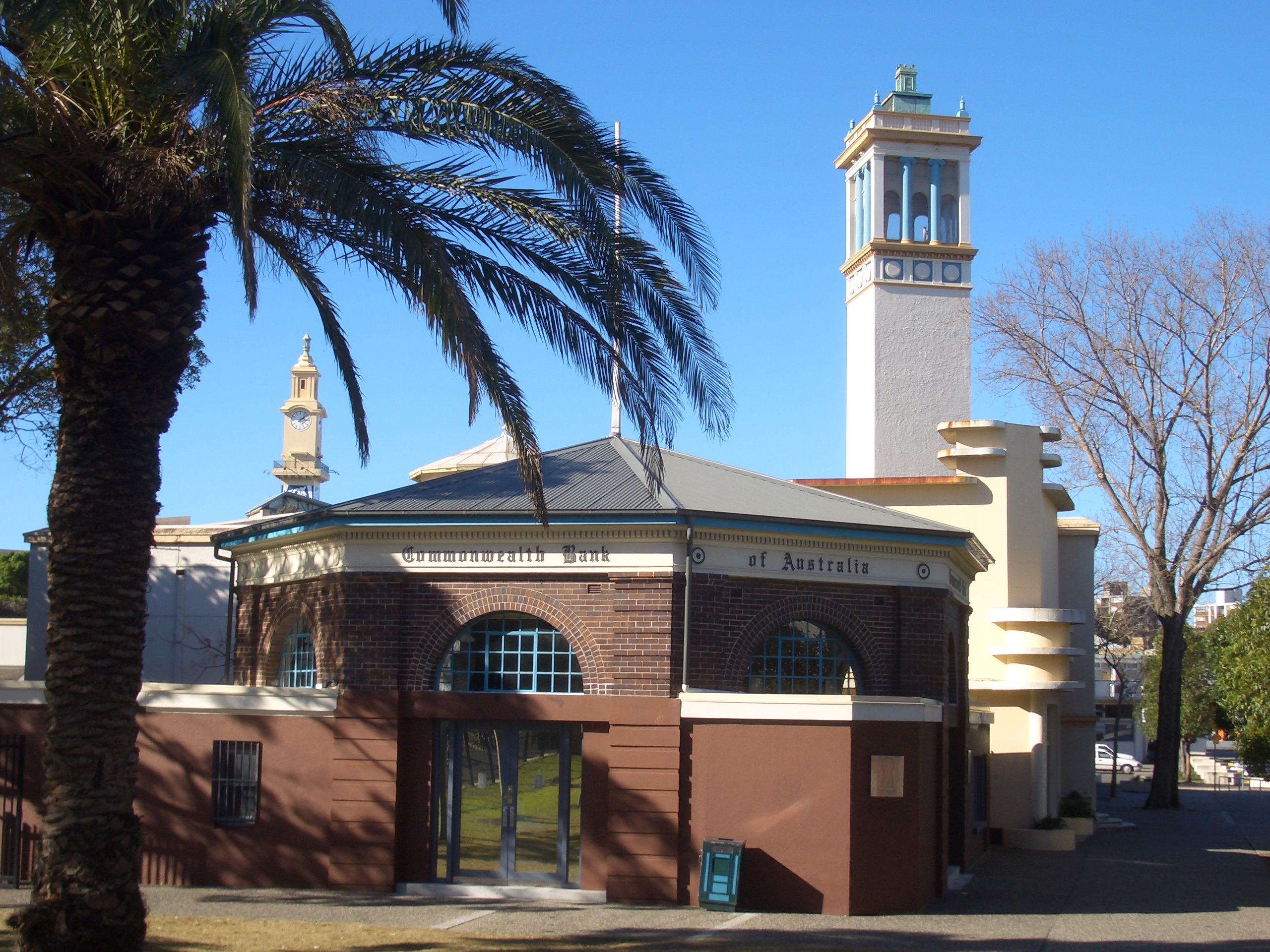
- Former Sydney Showground, Moore Park, NSW
- Interactive map of Former Sydney Showground
- Location: Moore Park, Sydney
- Coordinates: 33°53′36″S 151°13′37″E
- Owner: New South Wales Government
- Operator: News Corporation, 21st Century Fox, Disney Studios Australia (The Walt Disney Company)
- Capacity: 40,000 (originally 90,000)
- Surface: Grass

Construction
- Groundbreaking: 1882
- Opened: 1882
- Renovated: 1938
- Expanded: 1902–1919 Southwards; 1920–1937 Northwards
- Closed: 1997
- Demolished: 1998 re-purposed

Tenants
- Sydney Royal Easter Show (1882–1997); Sydney Roosters (1908–1929); South Sydney Rabbitohs (1908–1920); Empire Speedways (1926–1996); World Series Cricket (1977/78)

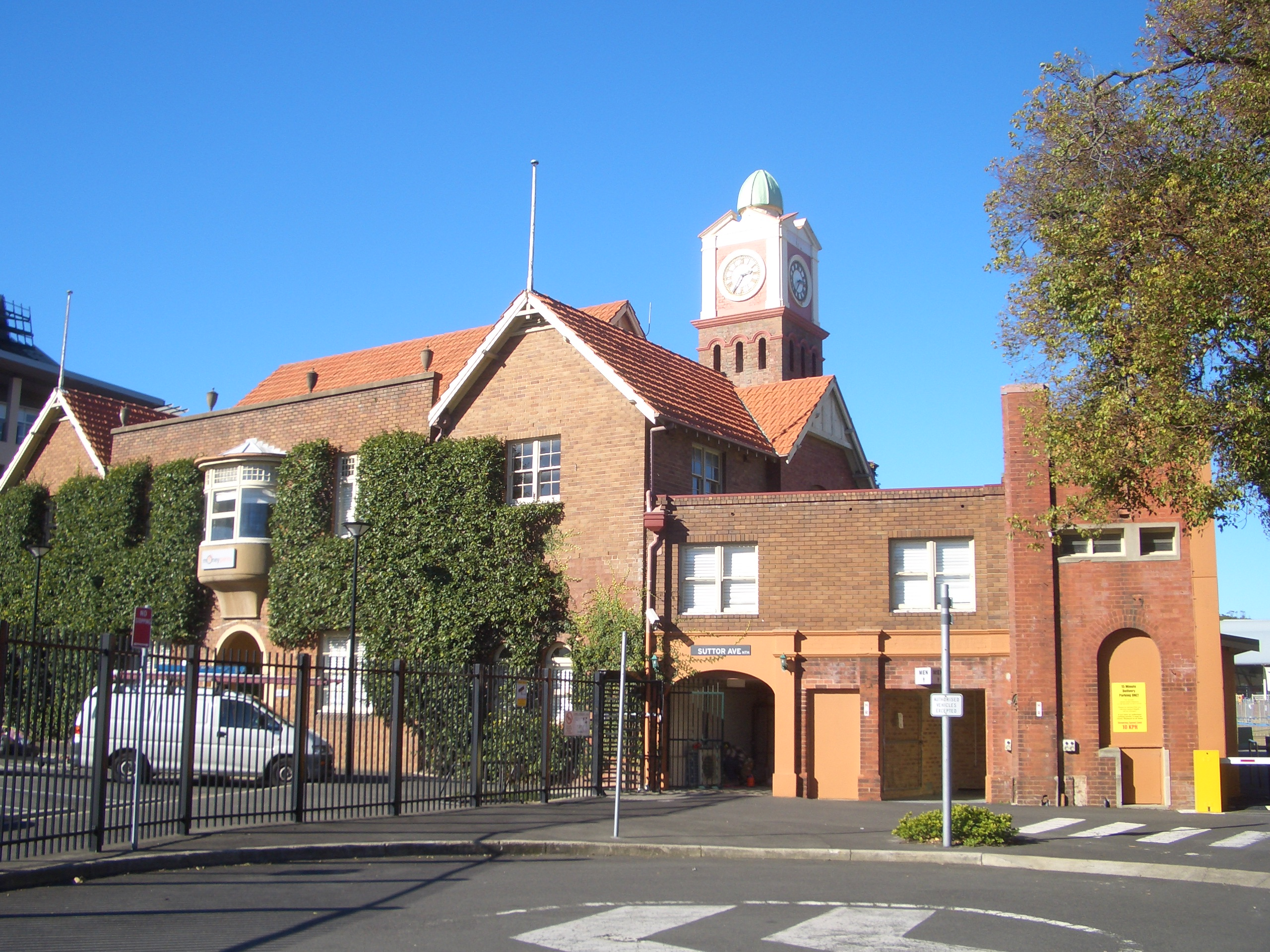
Showground showring

The former Sydney Showground (Moore Park) at Moore Park was the site of the Sydney Royal Easter Show in New South Wales, Australia, from 1882 until 1997. The Show was moved to the new Sydney Showground at Sydney Olympic Park, built for the Sydney 2000 Olympics.

24.3 hectares of the Moore Park site was then leased by the Royal Agricultural Society and the Government of Bob Carr on 27 September 1996 to Fox Studios Australia for a period of 40 years with an option to renew for another 10 years, a move which Clover Moore, member for Bligh in the New South Wales Parliament, opposed at the time.

== History ==
In 1811, Governor Macquarie proclaimed Sydney's second common, an area of 1,000 acres (4.0 km^{2}). In 1882, The Agricultural Society gained a lease from City of Sydney Council and established its grounds within the Moore Park site. This henceforth became the venue of the Sydney Royal Easter Show—an annual expression of national pride in Australian produce and industry.

The period from 1902 to 1919 saw the expansion of the showgrounds to the south. From 1920 to 1937, the grounds were further expanded to the north, with the addition of new squares and judging rings. The dominant visual elements of the complex by this time were the peripheral walls, the Members' Grandstand clock tower and the tower of the Anthony Hordern building.

The country's sesqui-centenary celebrations of 1938 led to a further building program at the showground, including the Government Pavilion and the Commemorative Pavilion. Aside from the Royal Easter Show and rugby league matches, the venue was used for World Series Cricket games in the late 1970s as the nearby Sydney Cricket Ground was unavailable. At its peak, the old showground could hold over 90,000 people.

The Main Arena at the Sydney Showground was also used as one of two Sydney Harness racing venues, the other being the Harold Park Paceway, located only 4 km from Moore Park in the suburb of Glebe.

Since the departure of the Sydney Royal Easter Show to the new showground, the old showground has been redeveloped as Fox Studios, and later Disney Studios Australia, a commercial venture designed at supporting Australia's film industry. It is in close proximity with some of Sydney's largest public venues, namely the Sydney Cricket Ground, Sydney Football Stadium, and the Hordern Pavilion, a multipurpose entertainment venue.

=== Speedway ===
From 1926 until 1996 the Showground's main arena also doubled as the Sydney Showground Speedway, a motorcycle speedway track. Officially known as Speedway Royale, the speedway attracted large spectator attendances throughout the summer months. Claimed to be the fastest speedway in the world in 1937, the 509 metres (557 yards) long "egg shaped" track was also the site of some spectacular crashes and some tragic deaths. Although solo motorcycles were first to race at the Showgrounds they were soon joined by sidecars, speedcars and later Super Modifieds. In the 1950s stock cars began to appear joined much later by demolition derbies.

=== Football (rugby codes) ===
The Showground was a venue for first grade club rugby union (now Shute Shield) games from 1883 until 1905. In 1888 the Showground hosted a match between the first British Lions team and Sydney University FC. Over the 1890s the end of season knock-out club matches were contested for The Agricultural Society Trophy, won by Wallaroo FC (1892, 1899), Randwick FC (1894), Wentworth FC (1896) and Pirates FC (1897, 1899).

The showground was the venue for the first game of rugby football sanctioned by the breakaway New South Wales Rugby Football League premiership, essentially the first game of rugby league in Australia. Played by a New South Wales team against New Zealand's rebel 1907 tourists, it attracted a sellout crowd of approximately 20,000. After that the Agricultural Ground hosted the first ever interstate matches between New South Wales and Queensland.

Sydney's Royal Agricultural Showground was then venue for the first Ashes test on Australian soil. The showground also became the venue for the NSWRFL's grand finals until the late 1920s, and eventually hosted 183 first grade rugby league games. The final ever Rugby League match played at the ground was on 11 April 1987 between North Sydney and St George in front of 24,000 spectators. Norths won the match 18–16.

It was the primary home ground for the Sydney Roosters rugby league club, then known as Eastern Suburbs, for the bulk of their first twenty seasons in the Sydney premiership. They played 97 matches at the ground between 1908 and 1929, and was the venue where the Roosters won their very first premiership in 1911, defeating Glebe 11-8 in the grand final.

=== Music ===
The venue hosted concerts by many famous artists, including Led Zeppelin, ABBA, David Bowie, AC/DC, The Police, Alice Cooper and Kiss, among others.

Alice Cooper played to over 40,000 fans at this venue on 26 March 1977. English rock band Led Zeppelin played to over 25,000 fans at the Sydney Showground in February 1972 as part of their 1972 Australasian Tour. Footage from the show is featured on disc two of the Led Zeppelin DVD released some thirty years after the event. Bob Dylan performed here on April 1, 1978.

The Sydney Showgrounds was also the venue for the annual Sydney Big Day Out music festival held in January between 1992 and 1997. The 1997 event was titled 'Six and Out - Big Day out' then indicating the final Big Day Out Festival before its new beginning at the new Sydney Showground Homebush in 1999. The former Sydney Showground is featured in the Rage Against the Machine video clip for "Bulls on Parade", from when they performed live at the Big Day Out Festival on 25 January 1996.
