= 1960 NSWRFL season =

Rugby league competition

1960 New South Wales Rugby Football League
- Teams: 10
- Premiers: St. George (7th title)
- Minor premiers: St. George (7th title)
- Matches played: 98
- Points scored: 3084
- Attendance: 1032655
- Top points scorer(s): Brian Graham (193)
- Wooden spoon: Parramatta (8th spoon)
- Top try-scorer(s): Reg Gasnier (25)

1960's New South Wales Rugby Football League premiership was the 53rd season of the rugby league competition based in Sydney. Ten teams from across the city competed for the J J Giltinan Shield and WD & HO Wills Cup during the season, which culminated in a grand final between St. George and Eastern Suburbs.

== Season summary ==
With four teams finishing on equal second place at the end of the regular season, and no weight given to the "for" and "against" points differential, minor premiers St. George watched Western Suburbs, Eastern Suburbs, Balmain and Canterbury-Bankstown go through a four-match series of playoffs before the real finals commenced. In a double header at the Sydney Sports Ground, Easts and Wests won the right to play off for second and third spots, while Canterbury and Balmain's losses meant they would play off for the fourth and final place in the finals series.

Also in 1960, NSWRFL president Henry "Jersey" Flegg died and Bill Buckley took up the position.

This season the Western Suburbs Magpies won the NSWRFL Club Championship.

=== Teams ===
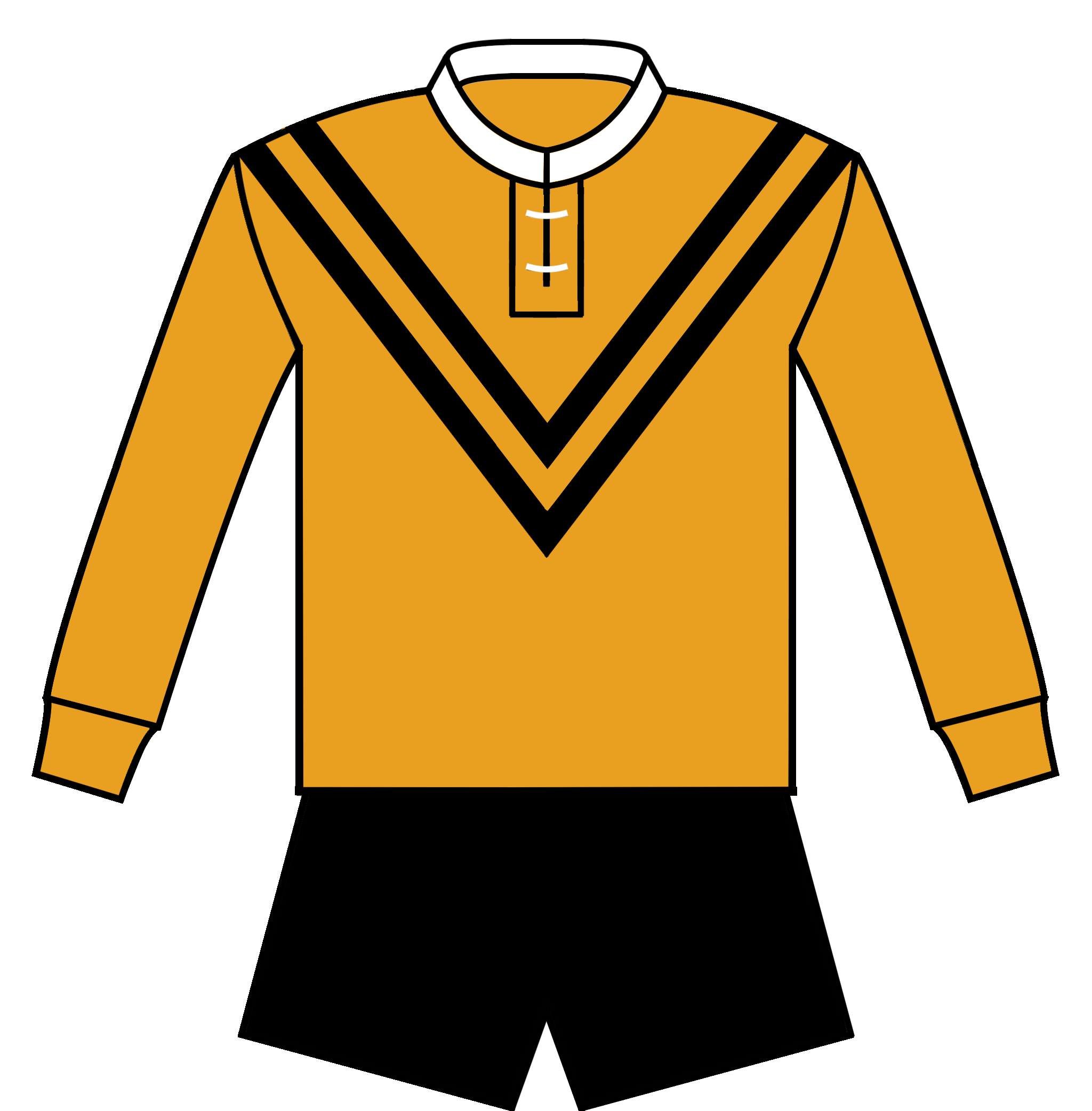
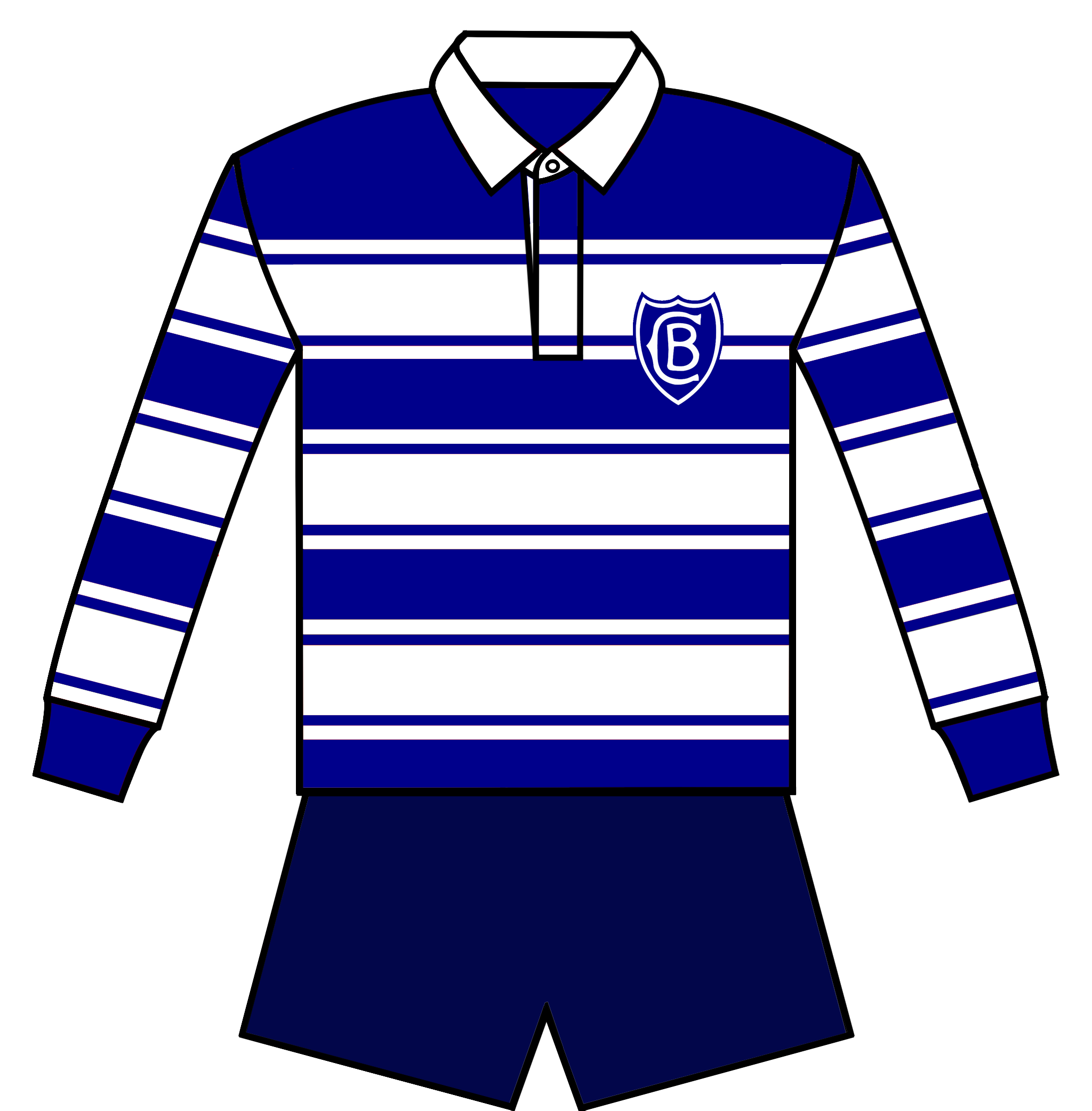
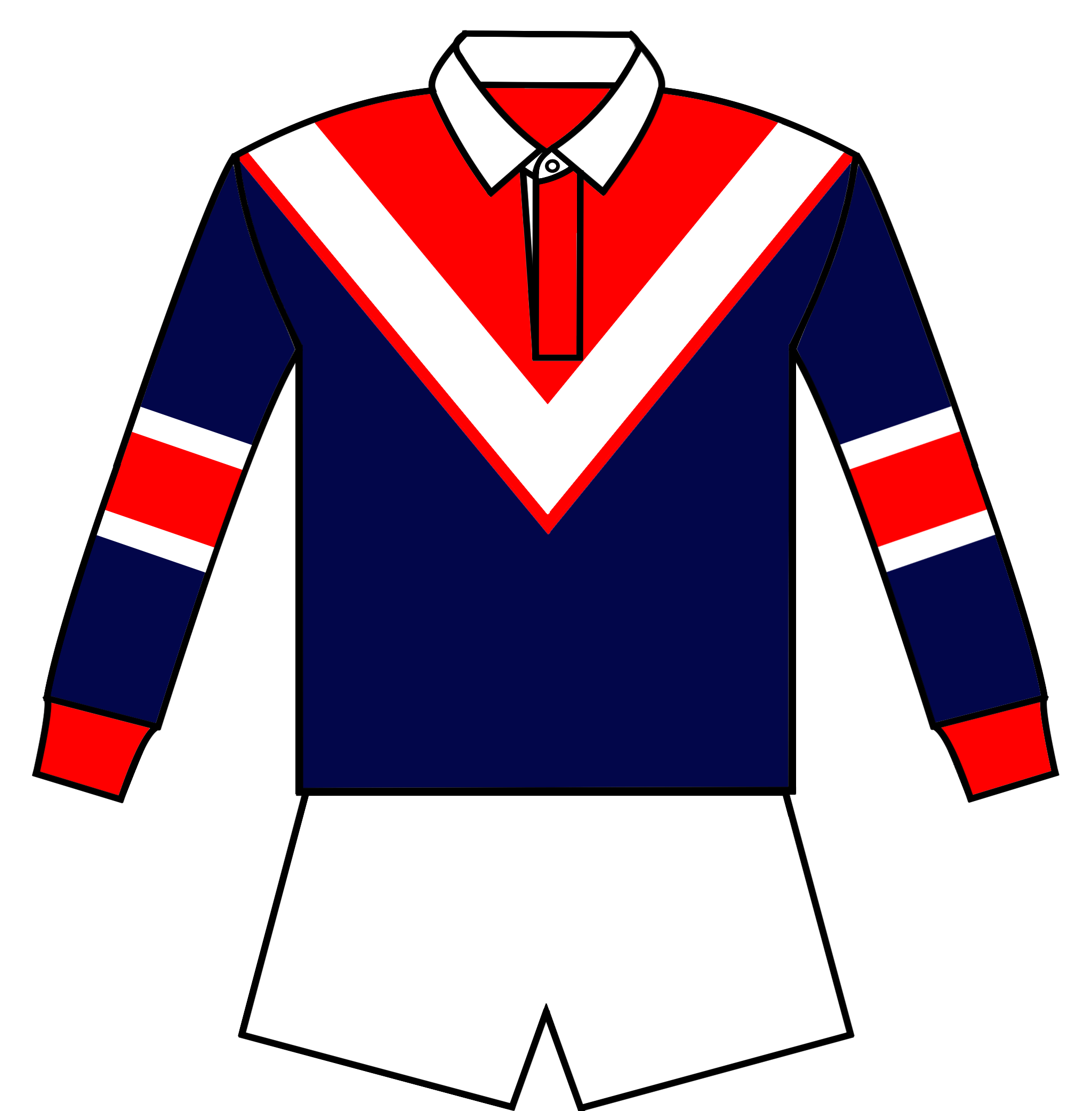
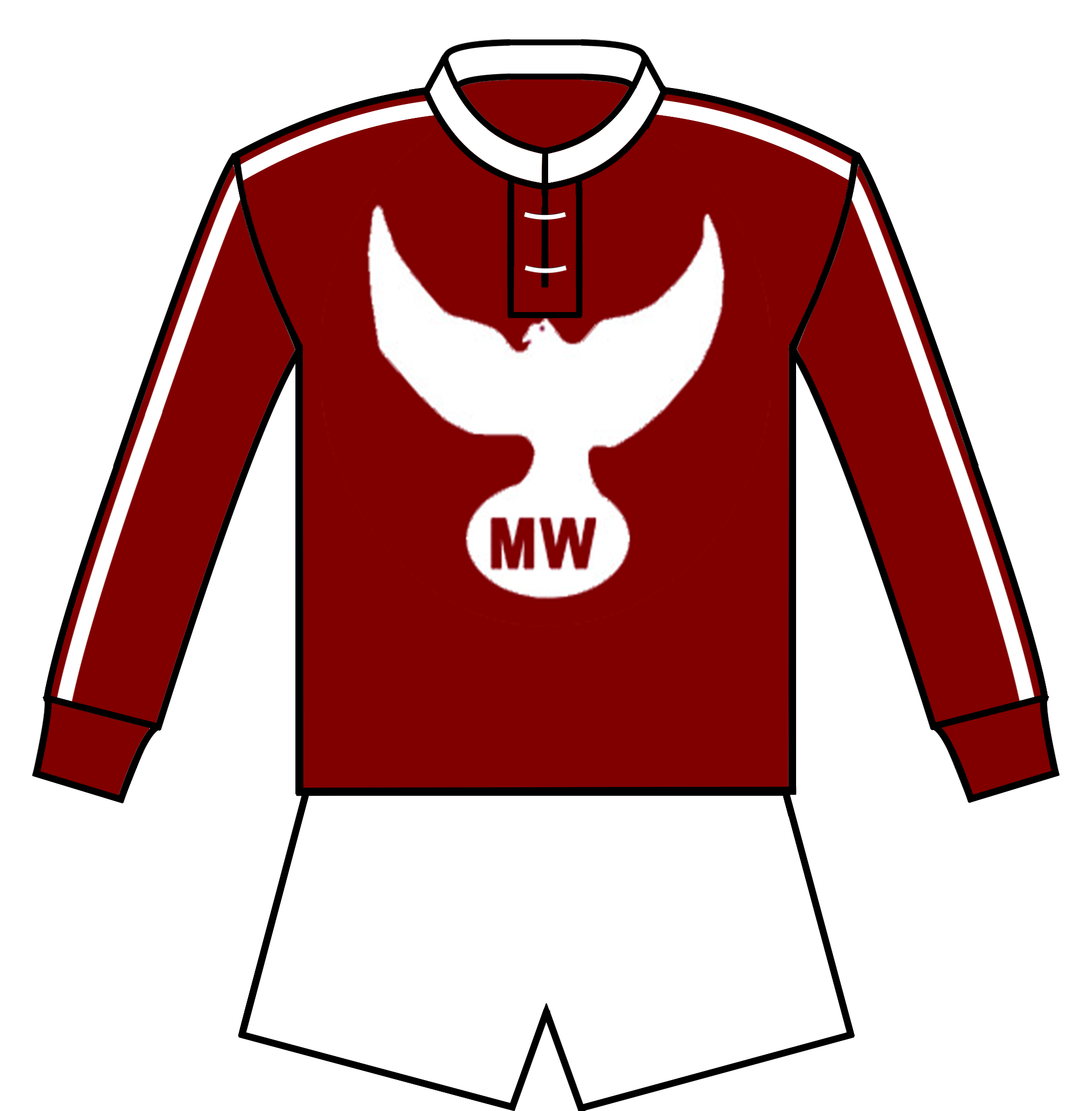
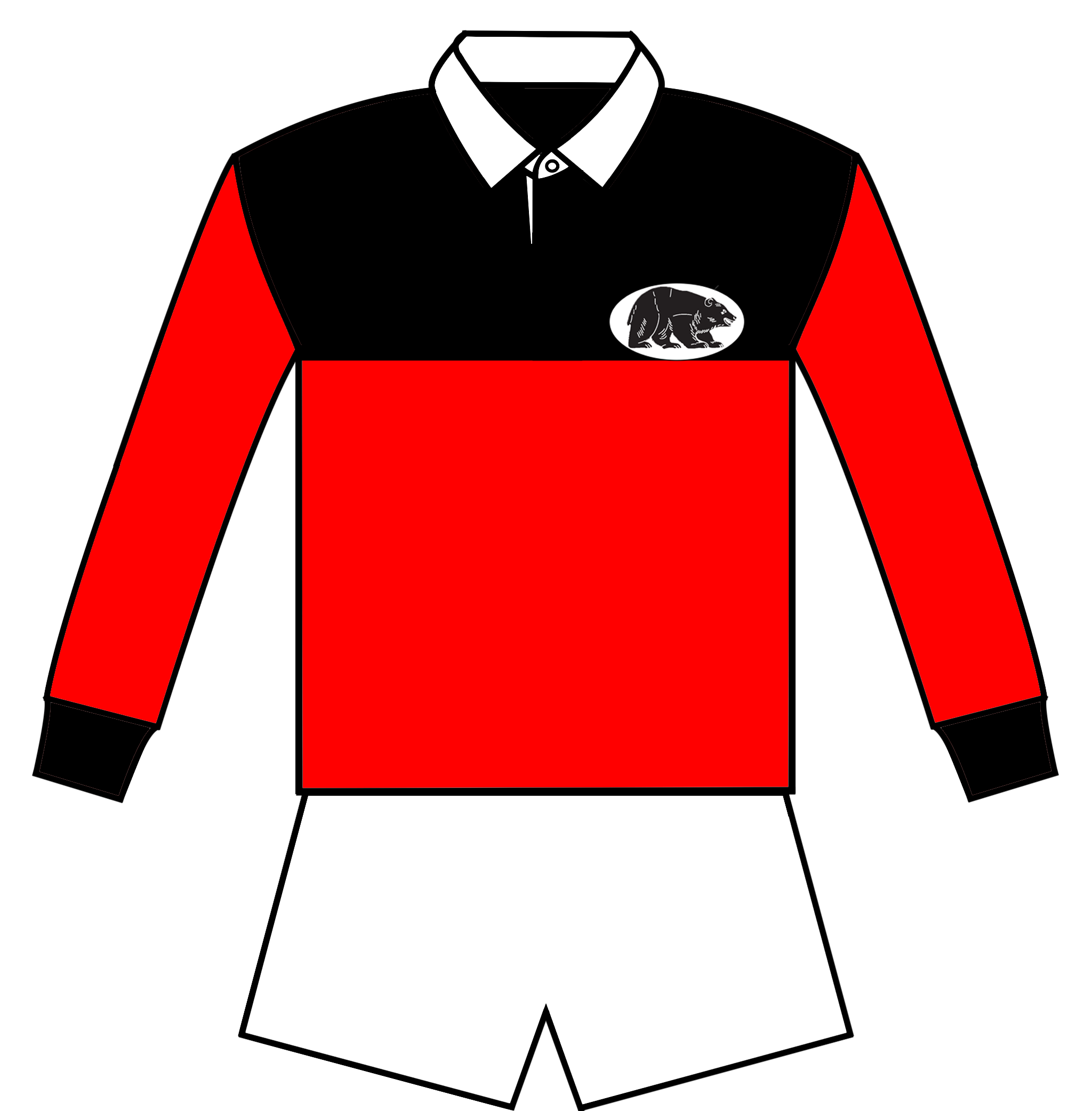
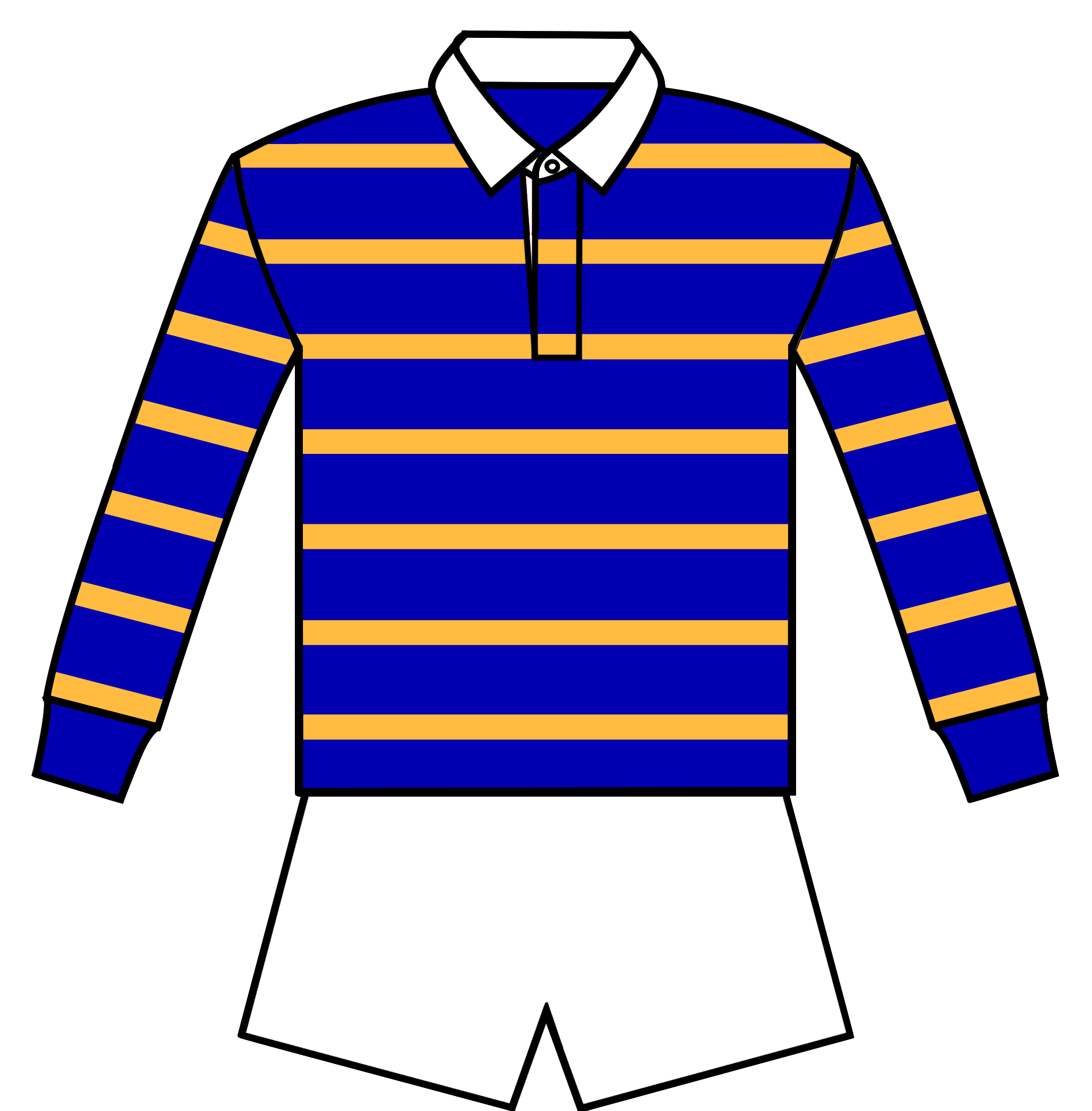
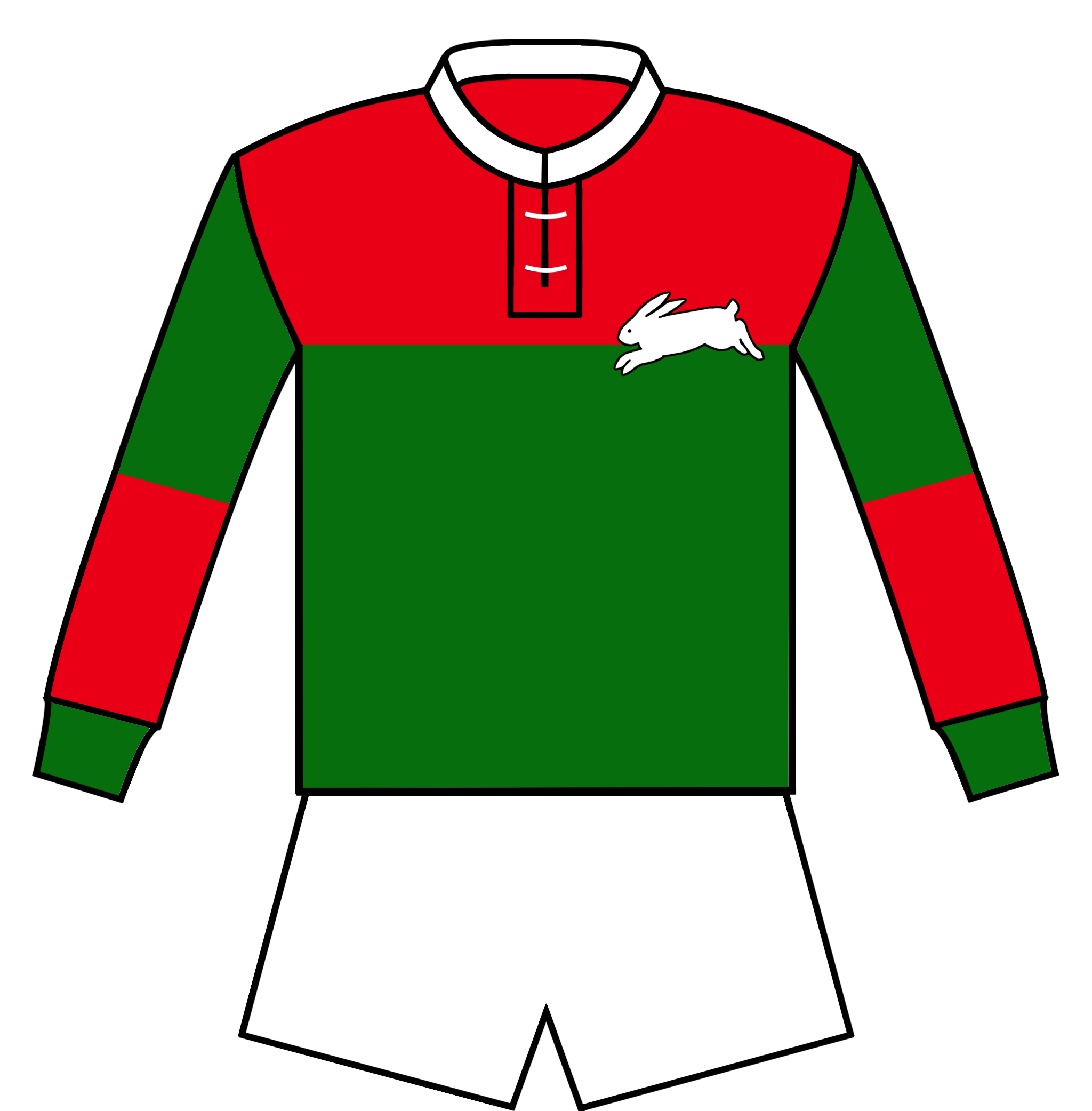
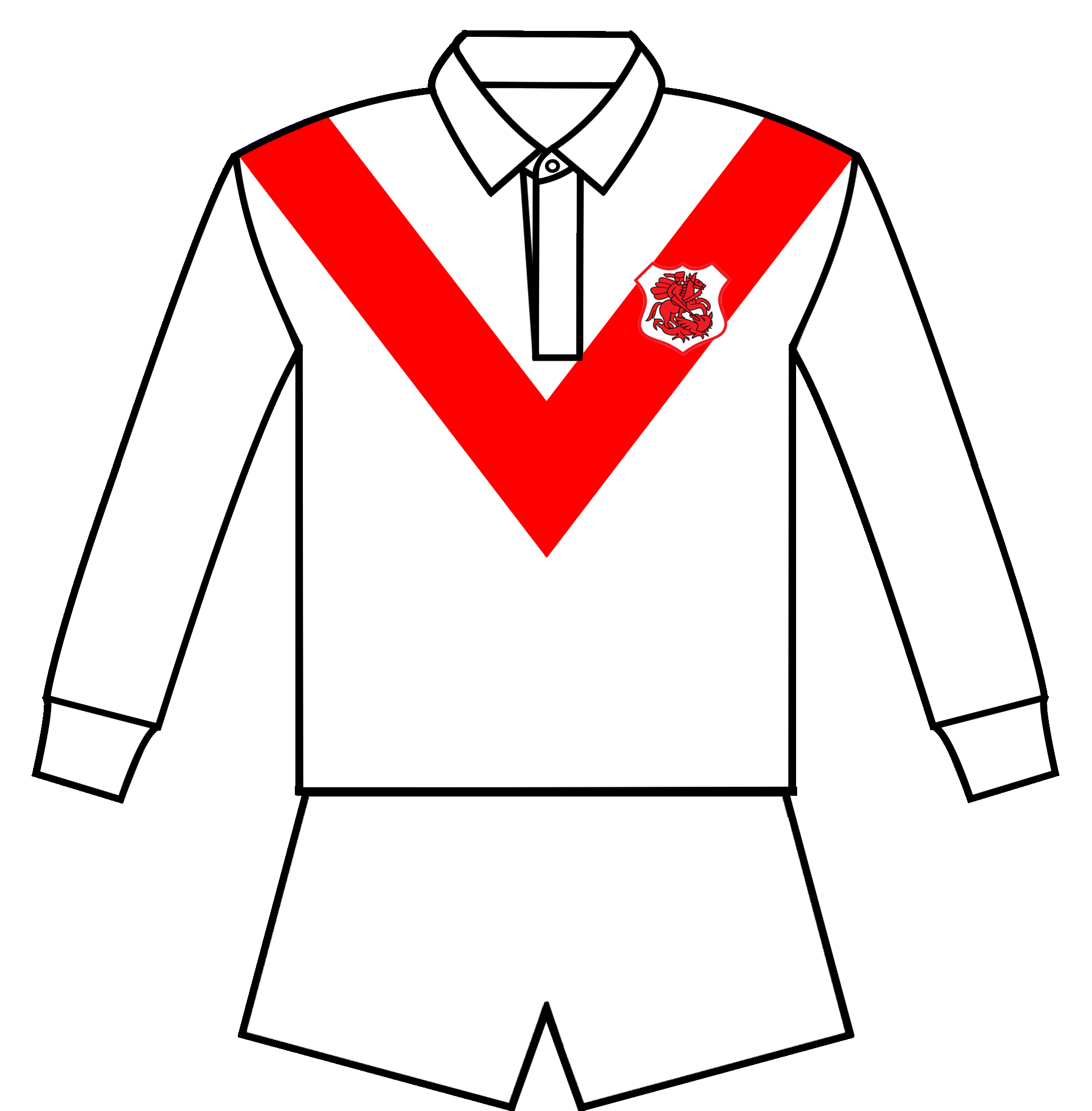
| Balmain 53rd season Ground: Leichhardt Oval; Coach: John O'Toole; Captain: Keith Barnes | Canterbury-Bankstown 26th season Ground: Belmore Sports Ground; Coach: Eddie Burns; Captain: Brian Davies | Eastern Suburbs 53rd season Ground: Sydney Sports Ground; Coach: Dick Dunn; Captain: Jack Gibson | Manly-Warringah 14th season Ground: Brookvale Oval; Coach: Ken Arthurson; Captain: Ron Willey | Newtown 53rd season Ground: Henson Park; Coach: Charles Cahill; Captain: Bobby Whitton |
| North Sydney 53rd season Ground: North Sydney Oval; Captain-coach: Greg Hawick | Parramatta 14th season Ground: Cumberland Oval; Coach: Jack Rayner; Captain: Ron Boden | South Sydney 53rd season Ground: Redfern Oval; Coach: Denis Donoghue; Captain: Bernie Purcell | St. George 40th season Ground: Kogarah Oval; Captain-coach: Ken Kearney | Western Suburbs 53rd season Ground: Pratten Park; Coach: Dudley Beger; Captain: Dick Poole |

== Regular season ==
| Team | 1 | 2 | 3 | 4 | 5 | 6 | 7 | 8 | 9 | 10 | 11 | 12 | 13 | 14 | 15 | 16 | 17 | 18 | F1 | F2 | F3 | F4 | GF |
|---|---|---|---|---|---|---|---|---|---|---|---|---|---|---|---|---|---|---|---|---|---|---|---|
| Balmain | SOU +7 | **NEW** **−3** | WES −12 | CBY +7 | **PAR** **+13** | **MAN** **+2** | NOR −20 | **EAS** **−1** | **STG** **+4** | **SOU** **−6** | NEW +3 | **WES** **+3** | **CBY** **−10** | PAR +21 | MAN +1 | **NOR** **+24** | EAS +3 | **STG** **−4** | WES −18 | **CBY** **−11** | | | |
| Canterbury-Bankstown | **NOR** **+11** | WES −11 | **EAS** **−8** | **BAL** **−7** | STG −33 | **PAR** **+11** | **SOU** **+7** | MAN +3 | NEW −19 | NOR +10 | **WES** **+10** | EAS +4 | BAL +10 | STG −36 | PAR −12 | SOU +14 | **MAN** **+3** | **NEW** **+7** | EAS −9 | BAL +11 | EAS −7 | | |
| Eastern Suburbs | **MAN** **−1** | NOR −6 | CBY +8 | **STG** **−7** | **SOU** **+15** | NEW −5 | **WES** **+9** | BAL +1 | PAR +12 | **MAN** **+7** | **NOR** **+1** | **CBY** **−4** | **STG** **+3** | SOU +4 | **NEW** **+18** | WES −21 | **BAL** **−3** | **PAR** **+12** | **CBY** **+9** | WES −11 | **CBY** **+7** | WES +5 | STG −25 |
| Manly-Warringah | EAS +1 | STG +12 | SOU +1 | NEW +1 | WES +4 | BAL −2 | PAR +17 | **CBY** **−3** | **NOR** **+9** | EAS −7 | STG −4 | **SOU** **+5** | NEW +3 | WES −23 | **BAL** **−1** | **PAR** **+7** | CBY −3 | NOR −3 | | | | | |
| Newtown | **WES** **−3** | BAL +3 | PAR +3 | **MAN** **−1** | NOR +10 | **EAS** **+5** | **STG** **−5** | SOU −13 | **CBY** **+19** | WES −9 | **BAL** **−3** | **PAR** **+9** | **MAN** **−3** | **NOR** **−4** | EAS −18 | STG −44 | **SOU** **−1** | CBY −7 | | | | | |
| North Sydney | CBY −11 | **EAS** **+6** | STG −39 | SOU −6 | **NEW** **−10** | WES −11 | **BAL** **+20** | **PAR** **+12** | MAN −9 | **CBY** **−10** | EAS −1 | **STG** **+14** | **SOU** **+2** | NEW +4 | **WES** **−2** | BAL −24 | PAR +22 | **MAN** **+3** | | | | | |
| Parramatta | STG −52 | SOU −13 | **NEW** **−3** | WES −14 | BAL −13 | CBY −11 | **MAN** **−17** | NOR −12 | **EAS** **−12** | STG −30 | **SOU** **+8** | NEW −9 | **WES** **−10** | **BAL** **−21** | **CBY** **+12** | MAN −7 | **NOR** **−22** | EAS −12 | | | | | |
| South Sydney | **BAL** **−7** | **PAR** **+13** | **MAN** **−1** | **NOR** **+6** | EAS −15 | **STG** **−12** | CBY −7 | **NEW** **+13** | **WES** **+9** | BAL +6 | PAR −8 | MAN −5 | NOR −2 | **EAS** **−4** | STG −3 | **CBY** **−14** | NEW +1 | WES −15 | | | | | |
| St. George | **PAR** **+52** | **MAN** **−12** | **NOR** **+39** | EAS +7 | **CBY** **+33** | SOU +12 | NEW +5 | **WES** **+33** | BAL −4 | **PAR** **+30** | **MAN** **+4** | NOR −14 | EAS −3 | **CBY** **+36** | **SOU** **+3** | **NEW** **+44** | WES +11 | BAL +4 | X | X | **WES** **+24** | X | **EAS** **+25** |
| Western Suburbs | NEW +3 | **CBY** **+11** | **BAL** **+12** | **PAR** **+14** | **MAN** **−4** | **NOR** **+11** | EAS −9 | STG −33 | SOU −9 | **NEW** **+9** | CBY −10 | BAL −3 | PAR +10 | **MAN** **+23** | NOR +2 | **EAS** **+21** | **STG** **−11** | **SOU** **+15** | **BAL** **+18** | **EAS** **+11** | STG −24 | **EAS** **−5** | |
| Team | 1 | 2 | 3 | 4 | 5 | 6 | 7 | 8 | 9 | 10 | 11 | 12 | 13 | 14 | 15 | 16 | 17 | 18 | F1 | F2 | F3 | F4 | GF |

Bold – Home game
X – Bye
Opponent for round listed above margin

=== Ladder ===
| | Team | Pld | W | D | L | PF | PA | PD | Pts |
|---|---|---|---|---|---|---|---|---|---|
| 1 | St. George | 18 | 14 | 0 | 4 | 456 | 176 | +280 | 28 |
| 2 | Western Suburbs | 18 | 11 | 0 | 7 | 350 | 298 | +52 | 22 |
| 3 | Eastern Suburbs | 18 | 11 | 0 | 7 | 264 | 221 | +43 | 22 |
| 4 | Balmain | 18 | 11 | 0 | 7 | 286 | 254 | +32 | 22 |
| 5 | Canterbury | 18 | 11 | 0 | 7 | 249 | 285 | -36 | 22 |
| 6 | Manly | 18 | 10 | 0 | 8 | 231 | 217 | +14 | 20 |
| 7 | North Sydney | 18 | 8 | 0 | 10 | 317 | 357 | -40 | 16 |
| 8 | South Sydney | 18 | 6 | 0 | 12 | 211 | 256 | -45 | 12 |
| 9 | Newtown | 18 | 6 | 0 | 12 | 251 | 313 | -62 | 12 |
| 10 | Parramatta | 18 | 2 | 0 | 16 | 215 | 453 | -238 | 4 |

=== Ladder progression ===
- Numbers highlighted in green indicate that the team finished the round inside the top 4.
- Numbers highlighted in blue indicates the team finished first on the ladder in that round.
- Numbers highlighted in red indicates the team finished last place on the ladder in that round.

| | Team | 1 | 2 | 3 | 4 | 5 | 6 | 7 | 8 | 9 | 10 | 11 | 12 | 13 | 14 | 15 | 16 | 17 | 18 |
|---|---|---|---|---|---|---|---|---|---|---|---|---|---|---|---|---|---|---|---|
| 1 | St. George | 2 | 2 | 4 | 6 | 8 | 10 | 12 | 14 | 14 | 16 | 18 | 18 | 18 | 20 | 22 | 24 | 26 | 28 |
| 2 | Western Suburbs | 2 | 4 | 6 | 8 | 8 | 10 | 10 | 10 | 10 | 12 | 12 | 12 | 14 | 16 | 18 | 20 | 20 | 22 |
| 3 | Eastern Suburbs | 0 | 0 | 2 | 2 | 4 | 4 | 6 | 8 | 10 | 12 | 14 | 14 | 16 | 18 | 20 | 20 | 20 | 22 |
| 4 | Balmain | 2 | 2 | 2 | 4 | 6 | 8 | 8 | 8 | 10 | 10 | 12 | 14 | 14 | 16 | 18 | 20 | 22 | 22 |
| 5 | Canterbury-Bankstown | 2 | 2 | 2 | 2 | 2 | 4 | 6 | 8 | 8 | 10 | 12 | 14 | 16 | 16 | 16 | 18 | 20 | 22 |
| 6 | Manly-Warringah | 2 | 4 | 6 | 8 | 10 | 10 | 12 | 12 | 14 | 14 | 14 | 16 | 18 | 18 | 18 | 20 | 20 | 20 |
| 7 | North Sydney | 0 | 2 | 2 | 2 | 2 | 2 | 4 | 6 | 6 | 6 | 6 | 8 | 10 | 12 | 12 | 12 | 14 | 16 |
| 8 | South Sydney | 0 | 2 | 2 | 4 | 4 | 4 | 4 | 6 | 8 | 10 | 10 | 10 | 10 | 10 | 10 | 10 | 12 | 12 |
| 9 | Newtown | 0 | 2 | 4 | 4 | 6 | 8 | 8 | 8 | 10 | 10 | 10 | 12 | 12 | 12 | 12 | 12 | 12 | 12 |
| 10 | Parramatta | 0 | 0 | 0 | 0 | 0 | 0 | 0 | 0 | 0 | 0 | 2 | 2 | 2 | 2 | 4 | 4 | 4 | 4 |

== Finals ==
| Home | Score | Away | Match Information |
| Home | Score | Away | Date and Time | Venue | Referee | Crowd |
|---|---|---|---|---|---|---|
Playoffs
| Western Suburbs | 28–10 | Balmain | 9 August 1960 | Sydney Sports Ground | | 21,308 |
| Eastern Suburbs | 20–11 | Canterbury-Bankstown | 9 August 1960 | Sydney Sports Ground | | 21,308 |
| Western Suburbs | 18–7 | Eastern Suburbs | 13 August 1960 | Sydney Cricket Ground | | 21,855 |
| Balmain | 7–18 | Canterbury-Bankstown | 14 August 1960 | Sydney Sports Ground | | 16,507 |
Semifinals
| St. George | 31–7 | Western Suburbs | 20 August 1960 | Sydney Cricket Ground | Col Pearce | 38,407 |
| Eastern Suburbs | 16–9 | Canterbury-Bankstown | 21 August 1960 | Sydney Sports Ground | Darcy Lawler | 18,455 |
Preliminary Final
| Western Suburbs | 15–20 | Eastern Suburbs | 27 August 1960 | Sydney Cricket Ground | Darcy Lawler | 29,393 |
Grand Final
| St. George | 31–6 | Eastern Suburbs | 3 September 1960 | Sydney Cricket Ground | Darcy Lawler | 53,156 |

=== Grand Final ===
| St. George | Position | Eastern Suburbs |
|---|---|---|
| 13. Brian Graham | FB | 40. John Andrew |
| 43. Johnny King | WG | 42. Boyce Beeton |
| 21. John Stathers | CE | 9. Bill Roney |
| 10. Reg Gasnier | CE | 17. Doug Ricketson |
| 23. Dave Brown | WG | 10. Bob Landers |
| 8. Brian Clay | FE | 8. Billy McNamara |
| 7. Bob Bugden | HB | 7. Bruce Ranier |
| 1. Billy Wilson | PR | 15. Bob McDonagh |
| 3. Ken Kearney (Ca./Co.) | HK | 2. Ken Ashcroft |
| 14. Kevin Ryan | PR | 14. Jack Gibson (c) |
| 4. Monty Porter | SR | 4. Brian Wright |
| 5. Norm Provan | SR | 5. Bob Heffernan |
| 6. Johnny Raper | LK | 6. Dick See |
| | Coach | Dick Dunn |

St. George had lost to Eastern Suburbs late in the regular season and expected them to be a finals force. But due to the playoffs for the minor premiership placements the Roosters were playing their sixth match in four weeks, including an extra-time tussle in the minor semi against Canterbury.

For the first grand final in four the defending premiers left their strongarm tactics in the locker room and let their skilled backline excel. Five minutes into the game Bob Bugden toed a loose ball through and fell on it to open the scoring. At 23 minutes the second try was set up by Brian Clay who beat his opposite Billy McNamara and passed to Reg Gasnier who dazzled the opposition with a change of pace that left them flatfooted.

Prop Kevin Ryan may have been in his rookie St. George season but he had already represented for Australia at rugby union and for Queensland in boxing. He had fit into the tough St. George pack with ease and featured on Grand Final day in setting up firstly fellow newcomer Johnny King for a first half try, then Gasnier after the break for his second before being sent off at the 60 minute mark, along with Easts forward Brian Wright, for fighting.

Norm Provan and Dave Brown also scored in the second half and two minutes before the bell an interplay between Provan and Brian Graham resulted in King getting his second try. Only a few weeks earlier Johnny King had been the third grade fullback, having been declined a contract offer early in the season from South Sydney.

Although they were on the wrong side of a 17-6 penalty caning, St. George scored seven tries to nil, walloping Eastern Suburbs 31-6.

Ken Kearney became the oldest player to appear in a grand final (36 years 123 days) and also equalled Jack Rayner's record of five grand finals won as captain.

St. George 31 (Tries: Gasnier 2, King 2, Bugden, Brown, Provan. Goals: Graham 5.)

Eastern Suburbs 6 (Goals: Landers 3.)

== Player statistics ==
The following statistics are as of the conclusion of Round 18.

Top 5 point scorers

| Points | Player | Tries | Goals | Field Goals |
|---|---|---|---|---|
| 173 | Brian Graham | 3 | 82 | 0 |
| 156 | Darcy Russell | 2 | 75 | 0 |
| 134 | Bob Landers | 12 | 49 | 0 |
| 122 | Kevin Considine | 6 | 52 | 0 |
| 118 | Keith Barnes | 0 | 59 | 0 |

Top 5 try scorers

| Tries | Player |
|---|---|
| 21 | Reg Gasnier |
| 16 | Ken Irvine |
| 15 | Bob Mara |
| 13 | Peter Dimond |
| 12 | Bob Landers |
| 12 | Horrie Toole |

Top 5 goal scorers

| Goals | Player |
|---|---|
| 82 | Brian Graham |
| 75 | Darcy Russell |
| 59 | Keith Barnes |
| 53 | Ron Willey |
| 52 | Kevin Considine |
