= 1961 NSWRFL season =

Rugby league competition

1961 New South Wales Rugby Football League
- Teams: 10
- Premiers: St. George (8th title)
- Minor premiers: Western Suburbs (4th title)
- Matches played: 94
- Points scored: 2830
- Attendance: 1035273
- Top points scorer(s): Bob Landers (164)
- Wooden spoon: Parramatta (9th spoon)
- Top try-scorer(s): Johnny King (20)

The 1961 New South Wales Rugby Football League premiership was the 54th season of the rugby league competition based in Sydney. Ten teams from across the city competed for the J J Giltinan Shield and WD & HO Wills Cup during the season, which culminated in a grand final between St. George and Western Suburbs.

== Season summary ==
Ten Sydney-based clubs participated in the competition with each team meeting all others twice in eighteen regular premiership rounds to reach a top four who battled out four finals.

In round 1, Sydney's Nine Network made the first live telecast of an Australian rugby league match between Balmain and North Sydney from North Sydney Oval on 15 April. The second half of the match was beamed live with former international Ray Stehr the first commentator. There were only two cameras to capture the action, one positioned on each 25-yard line and cameramen frantically switched lenses depending on where play was located.

St. George won their eighth premiership, defeating Western Suburbs in the Grand Final. The Magpies again won the NSWRFL Club Championship this season.

Also this season the Jersey Flegg Championship was introduced.

The 1961 season also saw the retirement from the League of future Australian Rugby League Hall of Fame inductee, Keith Holman.

=== Teams ===
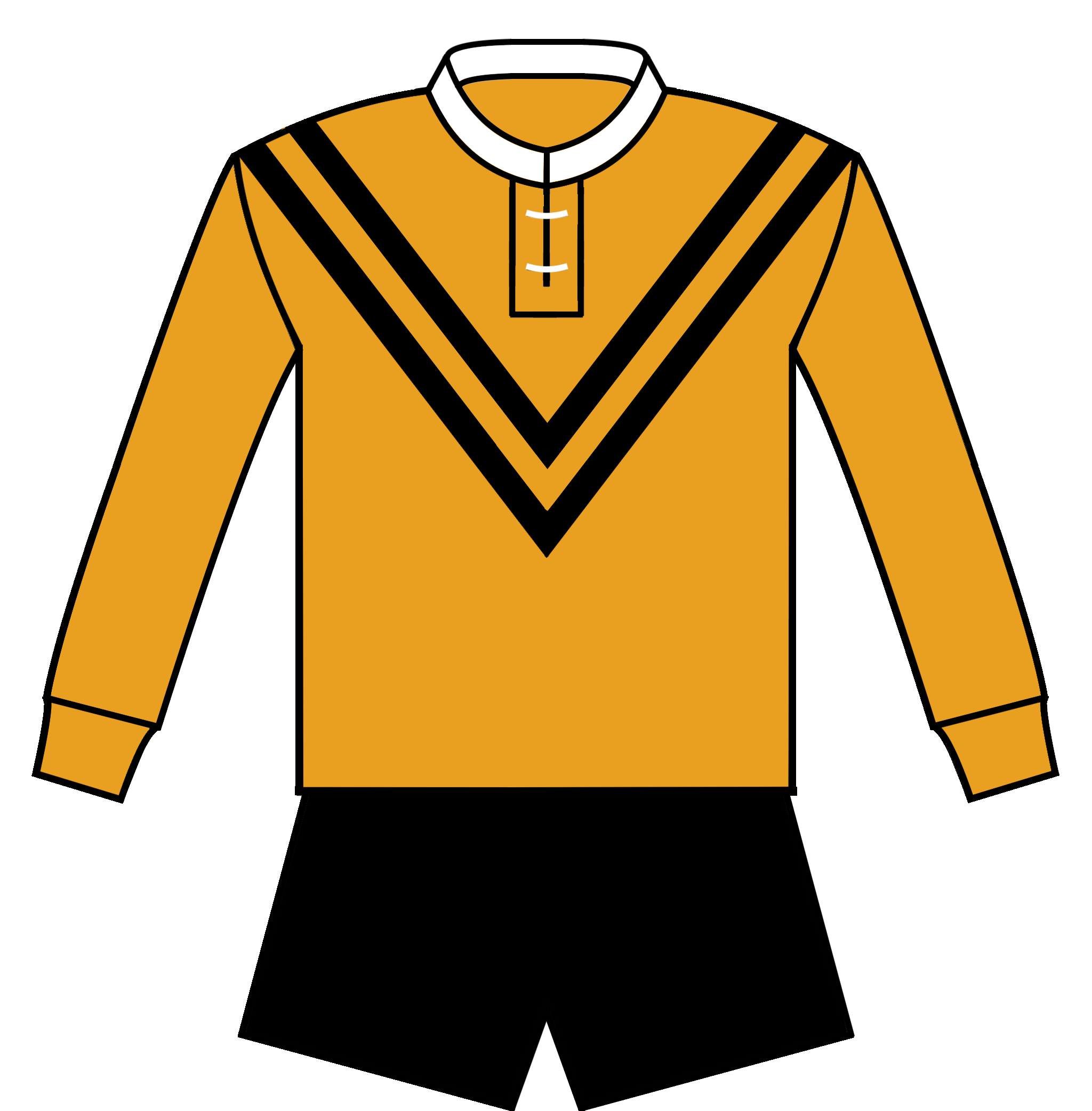
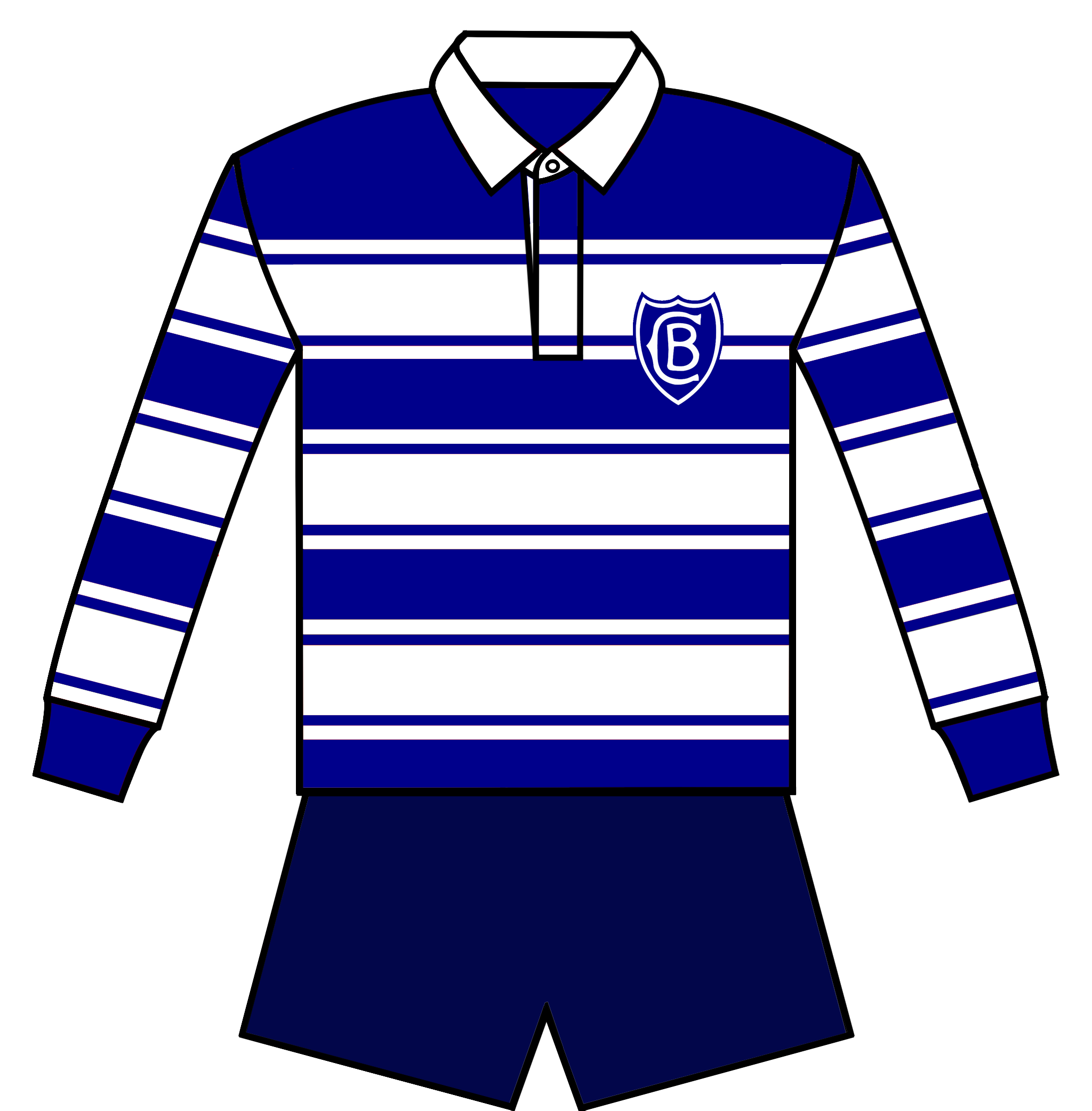
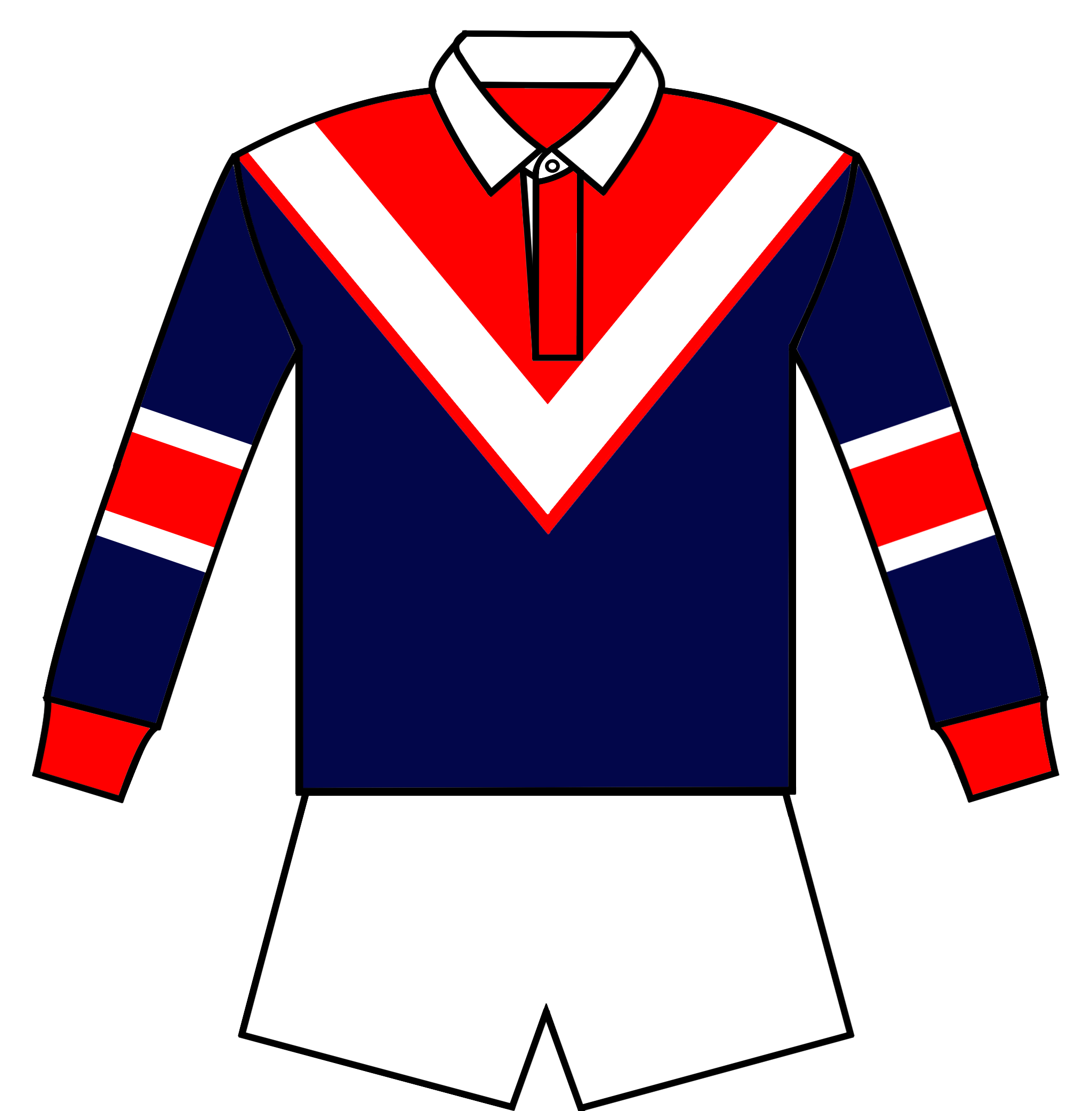
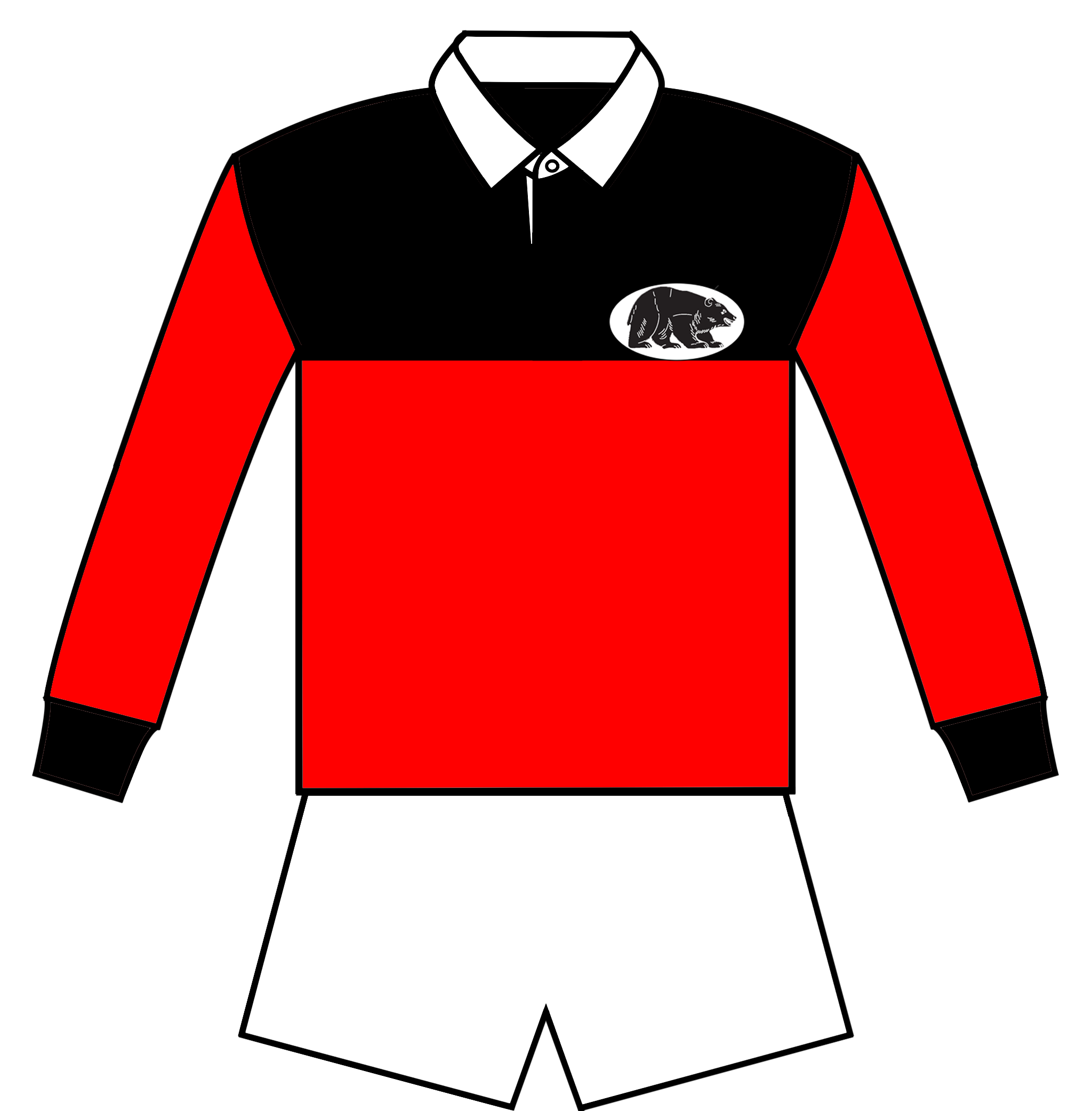
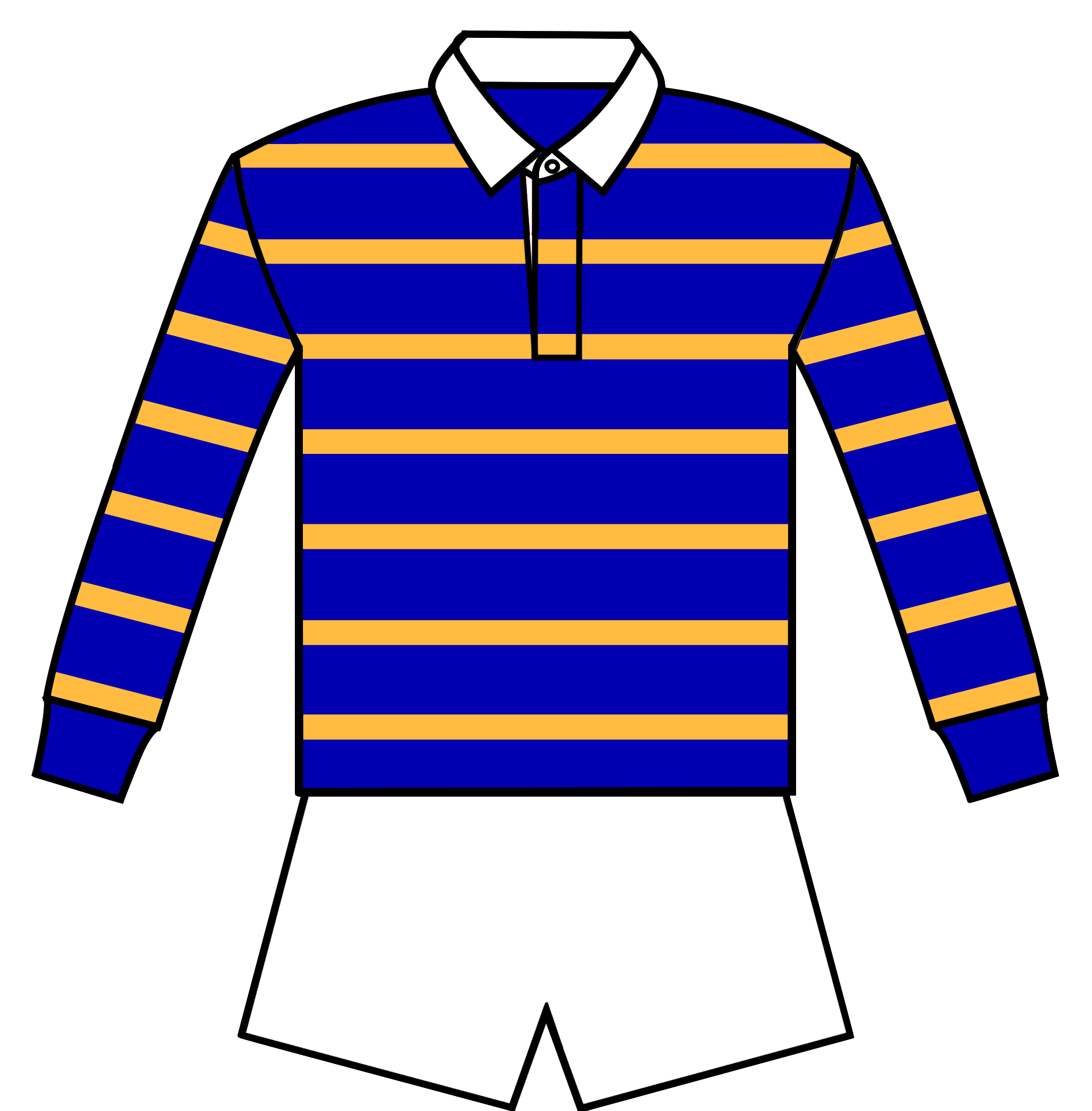
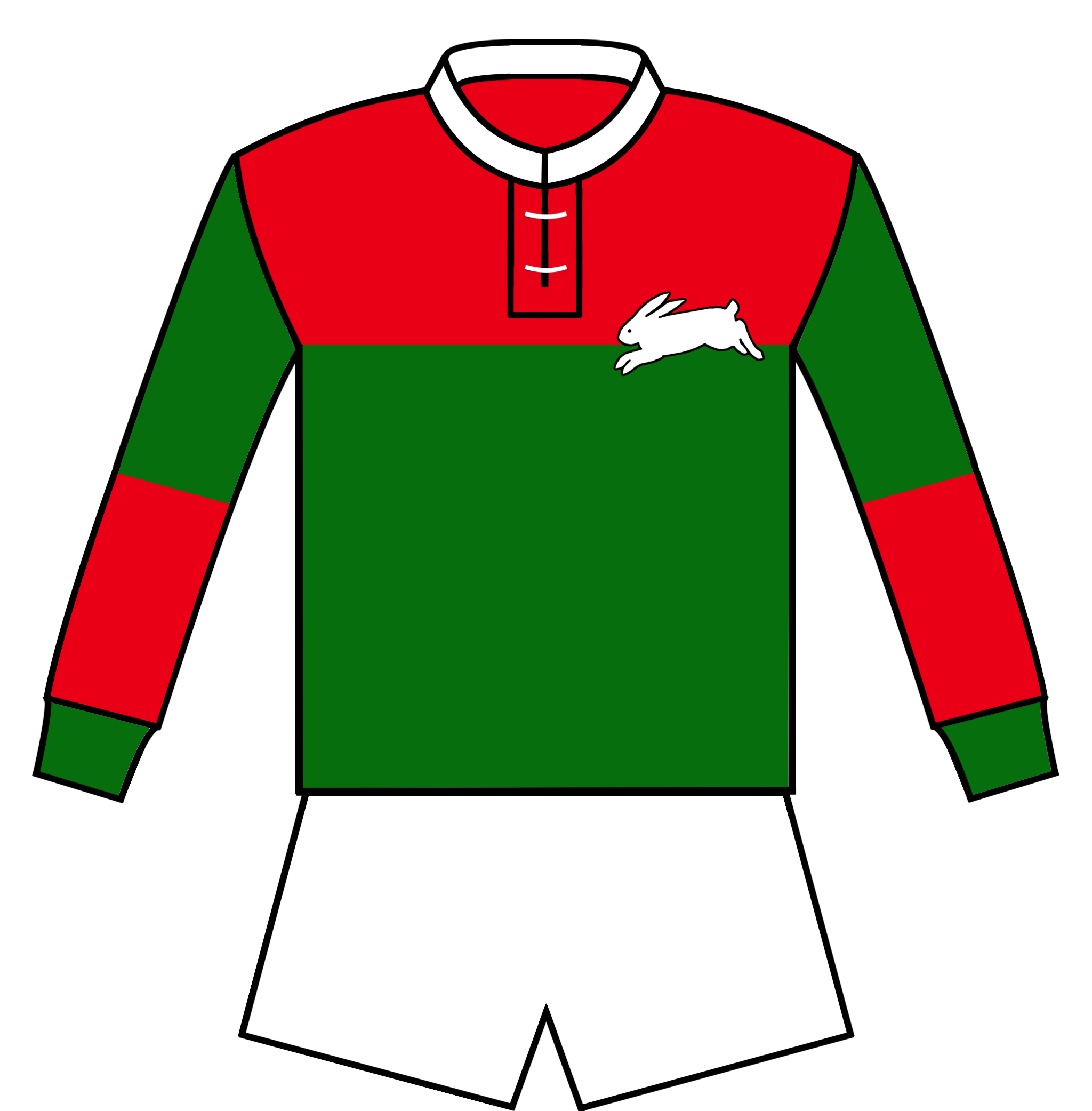
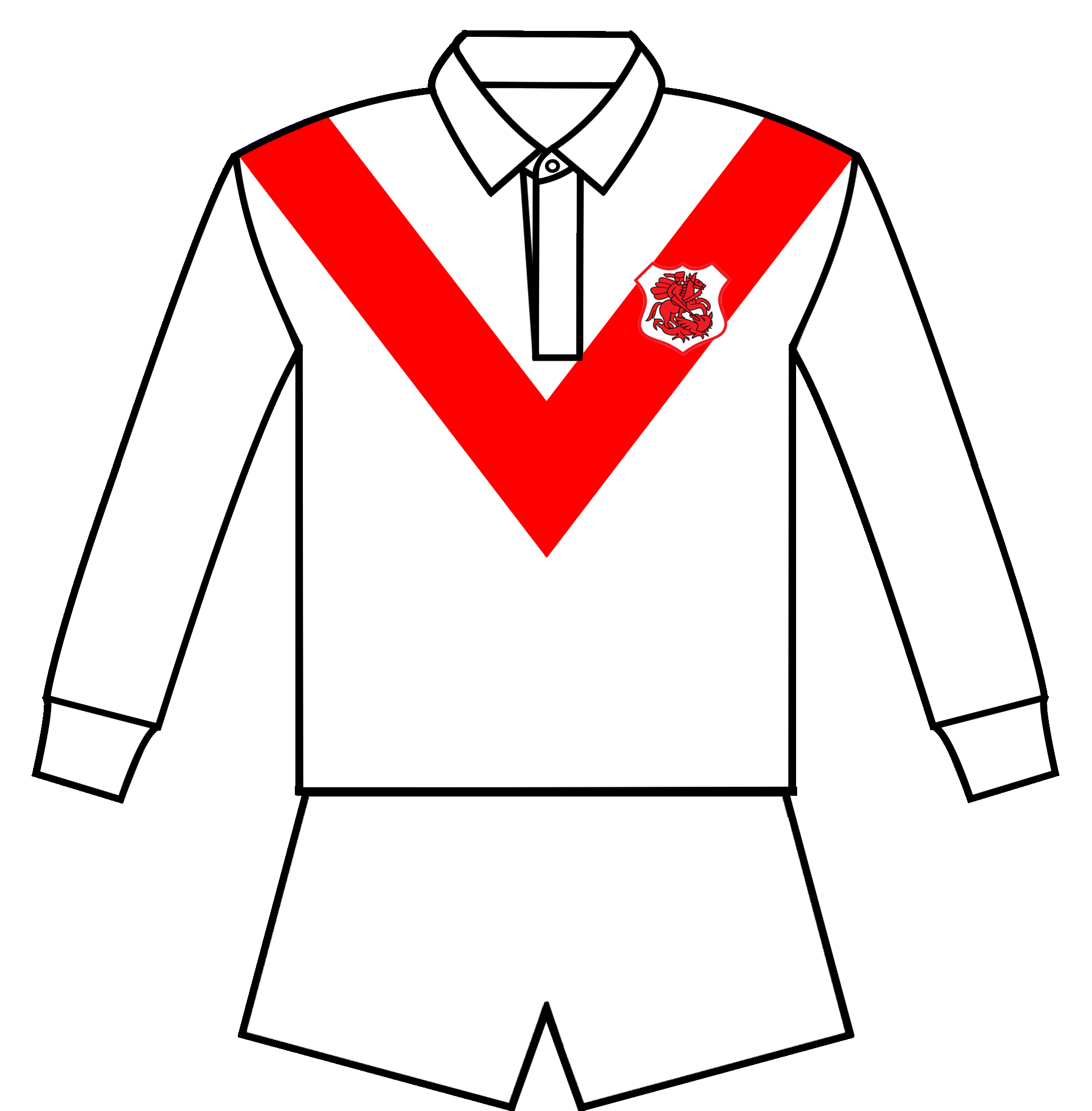
Balmain 54th season Ground: Leichhardt Oval; Coach: Harry Bath; Captain: Keith Barnes	Canterbury-Bankstown 27th season Ground: Belmore Sports Ground; Coach: Eddie Burns; Captain: Ray Gartner	Eastern Suburbs 54th season Ground: Sydney Sports Ground; Coach: Dick Dunn; Captain: Terry Fearnley	Manly-Warringah 15th season Ground: Brookvale Oval; Coach: Ken Arthurson; Captain: Rex Mossop	Newtown 54th season Ground: Henson Park; Coach: Charles Cahill; Captain: Tony Brown
North Sydney 54th season Ground: North Sydney Oval; Coach: Bob Sullivan; Captain: Brian Carlson	Parramatta 15th season Ground: Cumberland Oval; Captain-Coach: Ron Boden	South Sydney 54th season Ground: Redfern Oval; Coach: Denis Donoghue; Captain: Darrel Chapman	St. George 41st season Ground: Jubilee Oval; Coach: Ken Kearney; Captains: Brian Clay / Billy Wilson	Western Suburbs 54th season Ground: Pratten Park; Coach: Jack Fitzgerald; Captain: Neville Charlton

== Regular season ==
Team	1	2	3	4	5	6	7	8	9	10	11	12	13	14	15	16	17	18	F1	F2	F3	GF
Balmain	NOR +2	**STG** **−11**	**PAR** **−3**	EAS −24	**MAN** **−22**	WES −23	**NEW** **−20**	CBY +4	**SOU** **+22**	**NOR** **+14**	**STG** **−6**	PAR +3	**EAS** **+5**	MAN −9	**WES** **+2**	NEW +22	**CBY** **+3**	SOU +30	MAN +5	X	WES −2	
Canterbury-Bankstown	**MAN** **−6**	WES −22	**NEW** **+5**	PAR +14	**SOU** **−9**	NOR −14	STG −19	**BAL** **−4**	**EAS** **+3**	MAN +11	**WES** **−18**	NEW −14	**PAR** **+3**	SOU −11	**NOR** **+3**	**STG** **−6**	BAL −3	EAS; 0				
Eastern Suburbs	**SOU** **+14**	**NOR** **+13**	**STG** **−6**	**BAL** **+24**	PAR +8	**MAN** **−3**	WES −7	NEW +2	CBY −3	**SOU** **+5**	NOR +21	**STG** **+7**	BAL −5	**PAR** **−4**	**MAN** **−4**	**WES** **−1**	**NEW** **+18**	**CBY**; **0**				
Manly-Warringah	CBY +6	**SOU** **−3**	NOR −8	**STG** **+3**	BAL +22	EAS +3	PAR +28	WES −22	NEW −3	**CBY** **−11**	SOU −2	**NOR** **+20**	STG −9	**BAL** **+9**	EAS +4	**PAR** **+35**	WES −11	**NEW** **+24**	**BAL** **−5**			
Newtown	**WES** **−10**	PAR −33	CBY −5	SOU +1	**NOR** **−8**	**STG** **−12**	BAL +20	**EAS** **−2**	**MAN** **+3**	WES −28	**PAR** **+1**	**CBY** **+14**	**SOU** **−3**	NOR −18	STG −56	**BAL** **−22**	EAS −18	MAN −24				
North Sydney	**BAL** **−2**	EAS −13	**MAN** **+8**	WES −3	NEW +8	**CBY** **+14**	SOU +5	**PAR** **+12**	**STG** **−2**	BAL −14	**EAS** **−21**	MAN −20	**WES** **+3**	**NEW** **+18**	CBY −3	**SOU** **+2**	PAR +3	**STG** **−20**				
Parramatta	STG −10	**NEW** **+33**	BAL +3	**CBY** **−14**	**EAS** **−8**	SOU −11	**MAN** **−28**	NOR −12	WES −27	**STG** **−20**	NEW −1	**BAL** **−3**	CBY −3	EAS +4	**SOU** **−7**	MAN −35	**NOR** **−3**	**WES** **−20**				
South Sydney	EAS −14	MAN +3	**WES** **−8**	**NEW** **−1**	CBY +9	**PAR** **+11**	**NOR** **−5**	STG −12	BAL −22	EAS −5	**MAN** **+2**	WES −14	NEW +3	**CBY** **+11**	PAR +7	NOR −2	**STG** **−21**	**BAL** **−30**				
St. George	**PAR** **+10**	BAL +11	EAS +6	MAN −3	WES +3	NEW +12	**CBY** **+19**	**SOU** **+12**	NOR +2	PAR +20	BAL +6	EAS −7	**MAN** **+9**	WES −3	**NEW** **+56**	CBY +6	SOU +21	NOR +20	X	WES +5	X	WES +22
Western Suburbs	NEW +10	**CBY** **+22**	SOU +8	**NOR** **+3**	**STG** **−3**	**BAL** **+23**	**EAS** **+7**	**MAN** **+22**	**PAR** **+27**	**NEW** **+28**	CBY +18	**SOU** **+14**	NOR −3	**STG** **+3**	BAL −2	EAS +1	**MAN** **+11**	PAR +20	X	**STG** **−5**	**BAL** **+2**	**STG** **−22**
Team	1	2	3	4	5	6	7	8	9	10	11	12	13	14	15	16	17	18	F1	F2	F3	GF

Bold – Home game
X – Bye
Opponent for round listed above margin

=== Ladder ===
	Team	Pld	W	D	L	PF	PA	PD	Pts
1	Western Suburbs	18	15	0	3	390	181	+209	30
2	St. George	18	15	0	3	367	167	+200	30
3	Manly	18	10	0	8	294	209	+85	20
4	Balmain	18	10	0	8	281	292	-11	20
5	Eastern Suburbs	18	9	1	8	290	211	+79	19
6	North Sydney	18	9	0	9	273	298	-25	18
7	South Sydney	18	7	0	11	237	325	-88	14
8	Canterbury	18	6	1	11	197	284	-87	13
9	Newtown	18	5	0	13	236	436	-200	10
10	Parramatta	18	3	0	15	203	365	-162	6

=== Ladder progression ===
- Numbers highlighted in green indicate that the team finished the round inside the top 4.
- Numbers highlighted in blue indicates the team finished first on the ladder in that round.
- Numbers highlighted in red indicates the team finished last place on the ladder in that round.

	Team	1	2	3	4	5	6	7	8	9	10	11	12	13	14	15	16	17	18
1	Western Suburbs	2	4	6	8	8	10	12	14	16	18	20	22	22	24	24	26	28	30
2	St. George	2	4	6	6	8	10	12	14	16	18	20	20	22	22	24	26	28	30
3	Manly-Warringah	2	2	2	4	6	8	10	10	10	10	10	12	12	14	16	18	18	20
4	Balmain	2	2	2	2	2	2	2	4	6	8	8	10	12	12	14	16	18	20
5	Eastern Suburbs	2	4	4	6	8	8	8	10	10	12	14	16	16	16	16	16	18	19
6	North Sydney	0	0	2	2	4	6	8	10	10	10	10	10	12	14	14	16	18	18
7	South Sydney	0	2	2	2	4	6	6	6	6	6	8	8	10	12	14	14	14	14
8	Canterbury-Bankstown	0	0	2	4	4	4	4	4	6	8	8	8	10	10	12	12	12	13
9	Newtown	0	0	0	2	2	2	4	4	6	6	8	10	10	10	10	10	10	10
10	Parramatta	0	2	4	4	4	4	4	4	4	4	4	4	4	6	6	6	6	6

== Finals ==
Home	Score	Away	Match Information
Home	Score	Away	Date and Time	Venue	Referee	Crowd
Semifinals
Manly-Warringah	5–10	Balmain	27 August 1961	Sydney Sports Ground	Darcy Lawler	20,842
Western Suburbs	4–9	St. George	2 September 1961	Sydney Cricket Ground	Darcy Lawler	47,964
Preliminary Final
Western Suburbs	7–5	Balmain	9 September 1961	Sydney Cricket Ground	Darcy Lawler	40,726
Grand Final
St. George	22–0	Western Suburbs	16 September 1961	Sydney Cricket Ground	Darcy Lawler	61,196

=== Grand Final ===
St. George	Position	Western Suburbs
1. Brian Graham	FB	2. Don Parish
2. Johnny King	WG	15. Dave Barsley
3. Reg Gasniee	CE	20. Bill Brown
4. Dave Brown	CE	4. Billy Martin
5. Eddie Lumsden	WG	5. Peter Dimond
6. Brian Clay	FE	6. Keith Holman
7. Bob Bugden	HB	7. Arthur Summons
24. Kevin Brown	PR	13. Neville Charlton (c)
12. Peter Armstrong	HK	14. Noel Kelly
11. Billy Wilson (c)	PR	27. Mark Patch
13. Kevin Ryan	SR	12. Bill Carson
9. Norm Provan	SR	9. John Hayes
8. Johnny Raper	LK	8. Kel O'Shea
Ken Kearney	Coach	Jack Fitzgerald

Wests beat St George for the minor premiership on for-and-against and they were both ten points clear of their nearest rivals. If the Dragons run was to be stopped, this was the chance in legendary half Keith Holman's last match.

With misty rain on the day of the decider, Wests were knuckling down for another tight forward struggle as had been the case the major semi final also played in the wet. However, Saints stunned the Magpies as they ignored the conditions and threw the ball around.

The Dragons backline ran riot. Eddie Lumsden had a tremendous match, scoring three tries while Johnny King also scored another. Brian Clay, the best player on the field, cut loose against the veteran Holman who was playing in the unaccustomed five-eighth role. In every attacking raid there was an abundance of St George players backing up as the Wests' defence became more and more compressed.

St George scored three tries in a window of fifteen minutes to lead 15-0 at the 26-minute mark. The first was scored after nine minutes when Norm Provan from dummy-half passed to Johnny Raper who sent Clay away to the corner. Close to the sideline and fifteen metres before the try line, Clay called Lumsden inside him and snapped a reverse flick pass into the winger's hands enabling him to score untouched.

At the 21-minute mark from a St George scrum win Raper took the ball and ran toward King, he drew three defenders then lofted the ball to King who scored in the corner. Five minutes later a classic backline got the ball through the hands to Dave Brown who drew Barnsley in leaving Lumsden unmarked for his second try.

They took a 17-nil lead to the half-time break and the match appeared theirs. Fifteen minutes into the second half Lumsden scored again. St George then proceeded to lock up the game and Wests could not overcome the tough Dragons defence.

St George won their sixth Grand Final in a row, stunning Western Suburbs by 22-0. This victory enabled them to beat the previous record of Grand Final wins in a row, held by the South Sydney Rabbitohs. It was Bob Bugden's last match for the Dragons. He had featured in all six wins.

St. George 22 (Tries: Lumsden 3, King. Goals: Graham 5.)

Western Suburbs 0

== Player statistics ==
The following statistics are as of the conclusion of Round 18.

Top 5 point scorers

Points	Player	Tries	Goals	Field Goals
164	Bob Landers	14	61	0
137	Brian Graham	1	67	0
122	Ron Willey	4	55	0
105	Brian Carlson	3	48	0
94	Keith Barnes	0	47	0

Top 5 try scorers

Tries	Player
19	Johnny King
17	Brian Allsop
17	Ken Irvine
17	Dudley Towers
15	Peter Dimond

Top 5 goal scorers

Goals	Player
67	Brian Graham
61	Bob Landers
55	Ron Willey
48	Brian Carlson
47	Keith Barnes
