= History of the Sydney Roosters =

Australian rugby league

The Sydney Roosters have a history that stretches back from the birth of rugby league football in Australia in 1908 to the present day. It is the only remaining club to have played every season of top-tier football in Australia's history.

== Foundation years ==
The New South Wales capital city Sydney has had numerous football teams known as Sydney F.C. or similar, dating back to the first such club founded in 1865 who played their matches on Hyde Park. The city's first grade rugby union premiership in the late 1890s included at various times a Sydney F.C., Randwick F.C. and a Paddington F.C., then in 1900 under a new districts club scheme the Eastern Surburbs DRUFC was established.

On 24 January 1908 Eastern Suburbs decided at a meeting held at Paddington Town Hall to leave behind its Union counterparts and enter into the NSWRL. Bringing with them their local playing strip as worn during the rugby union days consisting of red, blue, and white, the Eastern Suburbs District Rugby League Football Club was born. The Eastern Suburbs District Rugby League Football Club, as it is still officially known today, was formed according to its articles of association with the NSWRL, to propagate the game of Rugby League in the eastern municipalities in the Sydney metropolitan areas, including the City of Sydney, Paddington, Darlinghurst, Vaucluse, Woollahra, Waverley and Randwick local government areas.

Sandy Pearce 1910

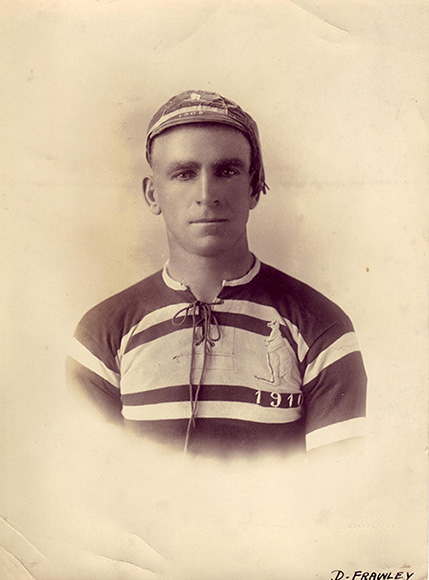
Dan Frawley 1911

With the NSWRL being able to sign Union crowd favourite Dally Messenger, Easts were handed his services due to rule stipulations regarding players playing for their local area. Easts were led out for the first time by Captain Henry "Jersey" Flegg and started off their existence with a 32–16 victory over Newtown in front of a crowd of 3000 at Wentworth Park. The "Tricolours" would remain competitive throughout the entire season even without star player Dally Messenger at the beginning of the season due to representative commitments.

The Tricolours fielded a lineup including Dan Frawley, Lou Jones, Sandy Pearce, Larry O'Malley, Albert Rosenfeld, Dally Messenger, and captain Jersey Flegg and lost only one regular season match that year. Although without several star players due to the 1908 Kangaroo Tour, Easts were able to defeat North Sydney to earn the right to face Souths in the final. In a highly contested match, Easts were close to snatching victory in the final minutes with a try in the corner. Trailing 14–12, the Tricolours were unable to make the conversion to force a re-match, and the inaugural premiership went to the Rabbitohs.

In 1909 Easts showed early signs of improving on the previous years' efforts. However a five-game, losing streak toward the back end of the competition saw the Tricolours bow out of contention. However, in 1910, the team was inconsistent and eventually missed out on a semi-final berth.

In 1911 Easts finally reaped the full benefits of Dally "The Master" Messenger, who declined to tour with the Australian team. Defeating Souths for the right to challenge minor premiers Glebe for the premiership, the Tricolours took Glebe on with the knowledge that a victory would entitle them to a re-match for the premiership. Winning 22–9 in the first of the two games, Easts prevailed 11–8 after a come-from-behind victory to take out their maiden premiership. Messenger was instrumental in the win, scoring a try, converting two others and kicking a field goal to help the Tricolours in their performance. During the season Messenger was involved as John "Dinny" Campbell in a match against Newtown kicked the last ever soccer-style field goal in premiership history.

In 1912 a rule-change was implemented, with the minor premier automatically declared premiers. Backing up with their previous year's performance, both the Tricolours and Glebe remained the two stand-out teams throughout 1912. With both teams suffering only one loss during the lead up to their match, it was anticipated that although four matches would remain after their clash, the winner would more than likely take out the premiership. In front of an approximate crowd of 25,000 at the Sports Ground, Dally Messenger once again proved the difference kicking a field goal minutes before full-time to lead the Tricolours to victory 6–4 in a close rain-soaked and muddy game.

In 1913 Easts again proved dominant, losing only to Newtown and Glebe. Easts finished atop of the ladder and were handed the 1913 Premiership. Completing their first premiership treble, Easts would also become the first team to ever win three premierships in a row. The 1914 season showed signs of promise from the Bondi-based team. However key losses in their final five games saw the Tricolours finish third for the end of the year. The following years showed little sign of improvements, as Easts did not finish higher than 5th.

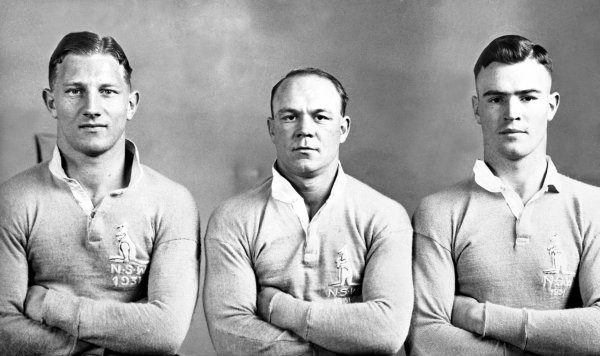
Three 1931 representative Roosters Brown, Norman and Stehr

With the introduction of the "first-past-the-post" era, where teams finishing on top of the ladder remained unchallenged, Easts had to settle for runners-up in both 1919 (Balmain) and 1921 (North Sydney). At the end of the 1923 season, both Easts and Souths finished equal first, resulting in a Grand Final between the two inner-Sydney clubs. The result was a 15–12 win by Easts in which captain Harry Caples proved the difference by scoring a late try to seal victory. The win gave the Bondi-based team their 4th premiership.

== The Golden '30s ==
The 1930s would provide one of, if not the most successful era of the Eastern Suburbs club. The decade started well for the Tricolours, with Arthur Halloway returning in 1930 as the team's new coach. The former Australian international had earlier been part of Easts' premiership winning teams of 1912 & 1913. His arrival sparked the Tricolours to finish second after the regular season in 1930, before losing a semi-final to St George. The following season, with the team, under the captaincy of Norm Pope finished minor premiers, but the team suffered a loss in the final. In 1934, the team finished joint minor premiers to the more experienced Wests team but went down to Wests 15–12 in the final.

The Tricolours finally made amends in 1935. By this stage, Easts had developed a stellar roster. Chief among them were Jack Beaton centre Dave Brown, halfback Viv Thicknesse, prop Ray Stehr, second rower Side "Joe" Pearce and lock Andy Norval, all of whom were named in the Roosters' team of the 20th century, as well as Ernie Norman and wing Rod O'Loan. In a 16-game regular season, Easts surpassed 50 points on six occasions. The chief destroyer for the Roosters was Dave Brown, whose records remain unbroken to this day. In Easts 87-7 defeat of Canterbury, Brown scored a record 45 points (5 tries, 15 goals), and scored 38 tries in the season. In the return match against Canterbury, Brown would score 38 points (second highest in history), including six tries. O'Loan scored 27 tries in that season, including 7 against University, which is still the second highest for an Australian rugby league first grade game. Finishing eight points ahead from their next opponent, Easts progressed into the Grand Final by defeating Wests in the major semi-final 15–10. The only team capable of stopping the mighty Easts failed to do so in the Grand Final, with Souths going down to the eventual premiers 19–3 in front of 22,106 spectators.

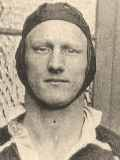
Dave Brown

The Tricolours went the following two seasons undefeated, the only occasion that a first grade rugby league club would achieve two seasons undefeated in Australian history. Easts would retain the premiership in 1936, winning 13 games from 15 (with two drawn), defeating Balmain 32–12 to claim their 6th premiership. Celebrating their 30th year of existence in 1937, Easts completed their second premiership treble by finishing minor premiers in a shortened season due to a Kangaroo Tour, which saw them automatically handed the premiership after finishing the eight-game season with 6 wins and two draws. All up, Easts had a 35-game undefeated streak during this time, 11 head of their closest rival (Balmain - 24 games undefeated between 1914 & 1916).

Feeling the strain of representative commitments having supplied eight players for the Kangaroo Tour, it would only be towards the back end of the 1938 season that Easts would show shades of their previous winning formula. Easts defeated Souths in the minor semi-final to take on Canterbury, who three years before were torn apart by the Roosters in an 87-7 defeat. However the turn-around was evident when Canterbury took out the premiership with a 19–6 win over the Tricolours.

== The war years, and more premierships ==
It would only take two years for Easts to exact revenge on the Canterbury-based team. Meeting them in the 1940 Grand Final after taking out the Minor Premiership, Easts prevailed 24–14 to claim their fourth premiership in six years. The following year Easts once again were able to make the Grand Final, but a determined St. George outfit won 31–14. Taking out their seventh Minor Premiership in 13 years, Easts headed up the 1945 Grand Final against fourth placed Balmain. With three tries and five goals by Dick Dunn, Easts took out the premiership 22-18 and moved up to second on the list of most premierships, only three behind Souths.

== Birth of the Rooster ==
For much of the first half of the 20th century, the Eastern Suburbs club was known colloquially as the "Tricolours" after the club colours of red, white and blue. Occasionally, the club was also referred to as the "Beachsiders" or the "Seasiders". In the 1960s, adopting a new playing strip that consisted of a V-shaped design similar to that of the popular French teams who also wore red, white, and blue, the Eastern Suburbs club became known as the Roosters. This was due to the similarities of the French team jersey, which displayed a cock badge on their jersey.

However it is contested by fans of the day that the rooster was associated with the football club decades earlier. This claim is strengthened by newspapers in the 1930s depicting photos of a rooster-top weather vane pointing eastward when publishing articles on the Sydney Roosters. The explanation given being that Eastern Suburbs being in the east, is where the sun would rise hence where the rooster would crow first. The football club itself has neither confirmed nor denied both origins of the rooster mascot.

The Roosters were able to make the 1960 Grand Final, but their opponents were St. George who were in the middle of a dynasty that lasted eleven premierships. The Jack Gibson-captained side was to be no match for the Dragons, with Easts defeated comprehensively 31–6. However, after this, the Roosters consistently finished at the bottom of the table and made history in 1966 by failing to win a single a game. In 1967, however, the Roosters finished in fourth place under the guidance of rookie coach Jack Gibson.

== The glory years ==
The 1970s would become a successful decade for the Roosters, competing in three Grand Finals, two in which they went on to become premiers. Reaching the Grand Final against Manly in 1972, Easts led early on before a series of mistakes and lost opportunities saw a comeback by Manly, who went on to win 19–14.

With the introduction of Easts Leagues Club, the Roosters brought Jack Gibson back to the Bondi-based club, along with a team including Mark Harris, John Brass, Bill Mullins, Russell Fairfax, Johnny Mayes, John Peard, Ron Coote, Ian Schubert and captain Arthur Beetson.

In 1974 and 1975 the Roosters would dominate the competition. Losing only five regular-season matches over both years, the Roosters steamrolled their way to back-to-back premierships. Gibson's second tenure at Easts started well in 1974, with the Roosters winning the pre-season Wills Cup final 43–0 against cross-town rivals Souths. The club comfortably won the minor premiership by eight points (or four extra wins), but became unstuck in the semi-final against Canterbury, due to a shocking refereeing decision by ref Keith Page, who ruled the match winning try to the Berries despite the try scorer clearly being offside. However, the Roosters got a second chance, and they annihilated Western Suburbs 25–2 in the preliminary final to set up a rematch against Canterbury in the grand final. The Roosters were clinical in the grand final, winning 19–4, with Arthur Beetson, Mark Harris and Bill Mullins scoring a try each, and Canterbury being held tryless.

The Roosters' premiership defence started slow in 1975, with the club losing a couple of early matches, but a win over Manly in round four proved the catalyst for a revival, with Easts going on a 19-game winning streak through the rest of the regular season. This is still a premiership record for most consecutive wins in first grade rugby league in Australia. This winning streak resulted in the Roosters claiming the minor premiership by 10 points (or five extra wins). The team's dominance also included that year's mid-week Amco Cup. Like the previous season, the Roosters lost their semi final match (and their winning streak), this time against St. George. A Kevin Stevens hat-trick in the preliminary final against Manly eased the club into another grand final, where St. George was waiting for them. In a match remembered for Graeme "Changa" Langlands' white boots and pain-killing injection gone wrong, the Roosters destroyed the Dragons with a 38 points to nil win to clinch their 11th premiership. This score line was a grand final record until 2008 (Manly def Melbourne 40–0), although tries were worth less points in 1975 (if it was played with four point tries then the score would have been 46–0).

While the 1976 season may not have brought premiership success, it did see the introduction of jersey sponsorship in the game, the Roosters once again leading the field, negotiated a $50,000 a season deal with the City Ford company. The move met with some opposition, but the other clubs quickly followed and today jersey sponsorship is commonplace in the game. Though another premiership would elude the Roosters for the rest of the 1970s, the club did win a further two pre-season cups (1977 and 1979), and another mid-week Amco Cup (1978). After the 1977 pre-season cup final victory over North Sydney, Queen Elizabeth II was present and presented the trophy to Arthur Beetson and Bob Fulton. The future Immortal Fulton had joined the Roosters from Manly at the start of 1977 and would move into coaching once his playing career at Easts had finished.

The Eastern Suburbs logo, worn on jerseys between 1978 and 1994.

Remaining competitive throughout the remainder of the decade, the Roosters returned to the Grand Final scene in 1980. Taking on the Canterbury-Bankstown Bulldogs team known as the "Entertainers", the Roosters were easily disposed of, being defeated 18–4 in the decider. In 1981 the Roosters were thought to get a chance of redemption after winning the minor premiership, however, crucial losses at the back end of the season saw them watching the Grand Final from the grandstands. 1982 would see the Roosters field one of their most competitive teams for a long time. Making the preliminary final against defending premiers Parramatta, the Roosters were sent packing with a 33–0 defeat.

== The "Transit Lounge" era ==
The following years were one of the least successful eras for the Roosters since the 1950s and 1960s. The period has recently been bestowed the nickname the "Transit Lounge" amongst fans due to the club's persistence to purchase established players often past their peak at an incredible price. Lasting more than a decade from 1983 to 1995, the Roosters only made the finals once during 1987, in which they were defeated by the Canberra Raiders in the preliminary final. Only three Australian representatives were produced: Trevor Gillmeister, Craig Salvatori, and David Trewhella. Easts also reached the final of the 1984 National Panasonic Cup but lost to the Brisbane 1sts.

== Super League and beyond ==
From 1995 to 1999, a new logo was adapted to represent name change to the Sydney City Roosters.

A bitter Super League war saw the arrival of coach Phil Gould in 1995. A year later, Australian captain Brad Fittler would follow in a show of no faith in the Super League-bound Penrith Panthers. Reaching the semi-finals for the first time in nine years, the Roosters bowed out of the 1996 competition with losses to the eventual Grand Finalists in Manly and St. George.

The 1997 line-up seemed one of the best on paper in the Australian Rugby League competition, consisting of players such as Terry Hermansson, Jason Lowrie, Adrian Lam, Luke Ricketson, David Barnhill, Scott Gourley, Matt Sing, Andrew Walker and Ivan Cleary. With all accompanying Brad Fittler, the newly named Sydney City Roosters took their premiership campaign to the Grand Final qualifier. Equalling the scores at 16 a piece with two late tries, the Roosters' Grand Final hopes ended with a field goal by Manly in the final minutes.

In a newly formed and unified National Rugby League competition, the Roosters were able to finish 6th to secure a finals berth. Away wins against the Melbourne Storm and Newcastle Knights saw the Roosters progress to the Grand Final qualifier for the second year in a row, where they were defeated comfortably by the Brisbane Broncos on their ground.

Sydney City Roosters "90 Seasons" logo, celebrating the 90th year of the club's existence in 1997.

1999 saw few highlights from the Roosters, which bowed out of contention with two straight final losses. The efforts of captain Brad Fittler, who displayed one of his most dominant performances for the Roosters with two solo tries, were not enough to defeat the newly formed St George Illawarra Dragons. The Roosters entered the new century dropping the "City" from their name to be called "Sydney Roosters". With a change of coach in Graham Murray and a new playing style in 2000, the Roosters progressed through to the Grand Final on the back of a tight victory against Newcastle in the Grand Final qualifier, where the Brisbane Broncos prevailed 14–6 in a dominant performance.

The Roosters would only have to wait two years to return to the Grand Final stage. Now under the direction of coach Ricky Stuart, the Roosters finished the regular season in fourth place, followed by finals victories over the Sharks, Knights and Broncos to reach the Grand Final. The 16–12 triumph over the Brisbane Broncos in the preliminary final was particularly pleasing to fans, who witnessed the Foundation Club overcome injuries to key players Luke Ricketson and Simon Bonetti to reach the decider. The Grand Final was the culmination of a 9-game winning streak to end 2002, with the club surprising their critics to take out the 2002 premiership with a 30-8 performance against minor premiers, the New Zealand Warriors. Trailing by two points early in the second half, the Roosters capitalised on a Brad Fittler 40/20 kick to allow Craig Wing to score, setting up a Roosters victory. Further second half tries to Clive Churchill Medalist Craig Fitzgibbon, Chris Flannery and Bryan Fletcher sweetened the victory. The win put the Roosters in third place on the all-time winners list, ahead of Balmain, but still behind St George (2nd) and South Sydney (1st).

The chance to gain premiership number thirteen came unstuck in 2003. Backing up with another appearance in the Grand Final, the Roosters were tormented by dropped balls at crucial times in a game marked by wet weather. The Roosters took the lead midway through the second half when winger Todd Byrne made a clear break, but he was dragged into touch by Scott Sattler. The Penrith Panthers took their second premiership ever, defeating the Sydney Roosters 18–6 in what many describe as the biggest upset since Balmain defeated Souths in 1969. The Roosters once again reached the Grand Final in 2004 against arch rivals the Canterbury Bulldogs. Canterbury won the game 16–13 in Roosters captain Brad Fittler's last match.

Having lost their star playmaker in Fittler, the Roosters struggled to mount any sort of attacking capabilities in 2005, although they were still able to show promising signs in the team's defence. This was not enough to secure the Roosters a finals berth, as they missed out for the first time since 1995.

== Batting for the century ==
With signings in both Braith Anasta and Ashley Harrison and alongside youngsters such as Iosia Soliola, the Sydney Roosters looked to have a promising 2006 season ahead of them. However, they won only eight games in the season.

The first of two 100 year logos, this logo was used exclusively in season 2007 to honour the Sydney Roosters 100th season.

Coach Ricky Stuart would pay the ultimate price for such a poor performance, being sacked of the coaching role having only been told months earlier that the club would see out his contract that lasted until the end of 2007.

Marching on to their 100th season in 2007 with 999 wins under their belt, the Roosters signed two-time premiership winning coach Chris Anderson to head coach for the 2007 and 2008 seasons with the notion of blooding newly promoted assistant coach Brad Fittler to top position in season 2009.

The centenary season celebrations were delayed after the Roosters lost their opening five games, including the 'Monday Night Football' blockbuster between arch-rivals South Sydney Rabbitohs in round 1. The 1000th win finally came in the annual ANZAC Day clash against St George Illawarra Dragons downing the Dragons 18–4. Victories were few; in round 17, the Manly-Warringah Sea Eagles defeated the Roosters 56–0.

After the defeat, Chris Anderson's stepped down from the head coaching role and allowing Brad Fittler to step into the top job. Fittler's late season charge showed signs of hope in 2008, although the Roosters would miss out on the finals, Fittler lost only two matches for the remainder of the season and recorded significant victories against eventual grand final winners the Melbourne Storm and arch-rivals the South Sydney Rabbitohs in the final round.

Also in 2007 the Sydney Roosters High Performance Centre and Administrative departments set up their headquarters at the Sydney Football Stadium.

The Roosters built on their late 2007 promise in the 2008 season, finishing in the top 4 of the minor premiership. However they ended the regular season with a series of losses that derailed their momentum going into the playoffs. They were eventually knocked out in the second round of the finals series by the New Zealand Warriors.

After a poor 2009 season, Roosters started to rebuild their team with the signing of Brian Smith from Newcastle Knights as their coach to replace sacked Brad Fittler for 2010 season. They also signed a new major sponsor, Steggles. Roosters then signed Todd Carney, Daniel Conn, Aidan Guerra, JP Du Pulessis and other players to rebuild their season in 2010. Overall, after 26 rounds of 2010 season, Roosters finished sixth, which secured them finals berth. In their first Finals match of 2010 the Sydney Roosters pulled off a miraculous come-from-behind victory over the Wests Tigers in what has been dubbed 'The Greatest Rugby League Game In History.' They then went on to record comprehensive victories over the Penrith Panthers and Gold Coast Titans. The Sydney Roosters qualified for their first grand final since 2004. The Roosters lost the grand final 32–8 to the St George Illawarra Dragons.

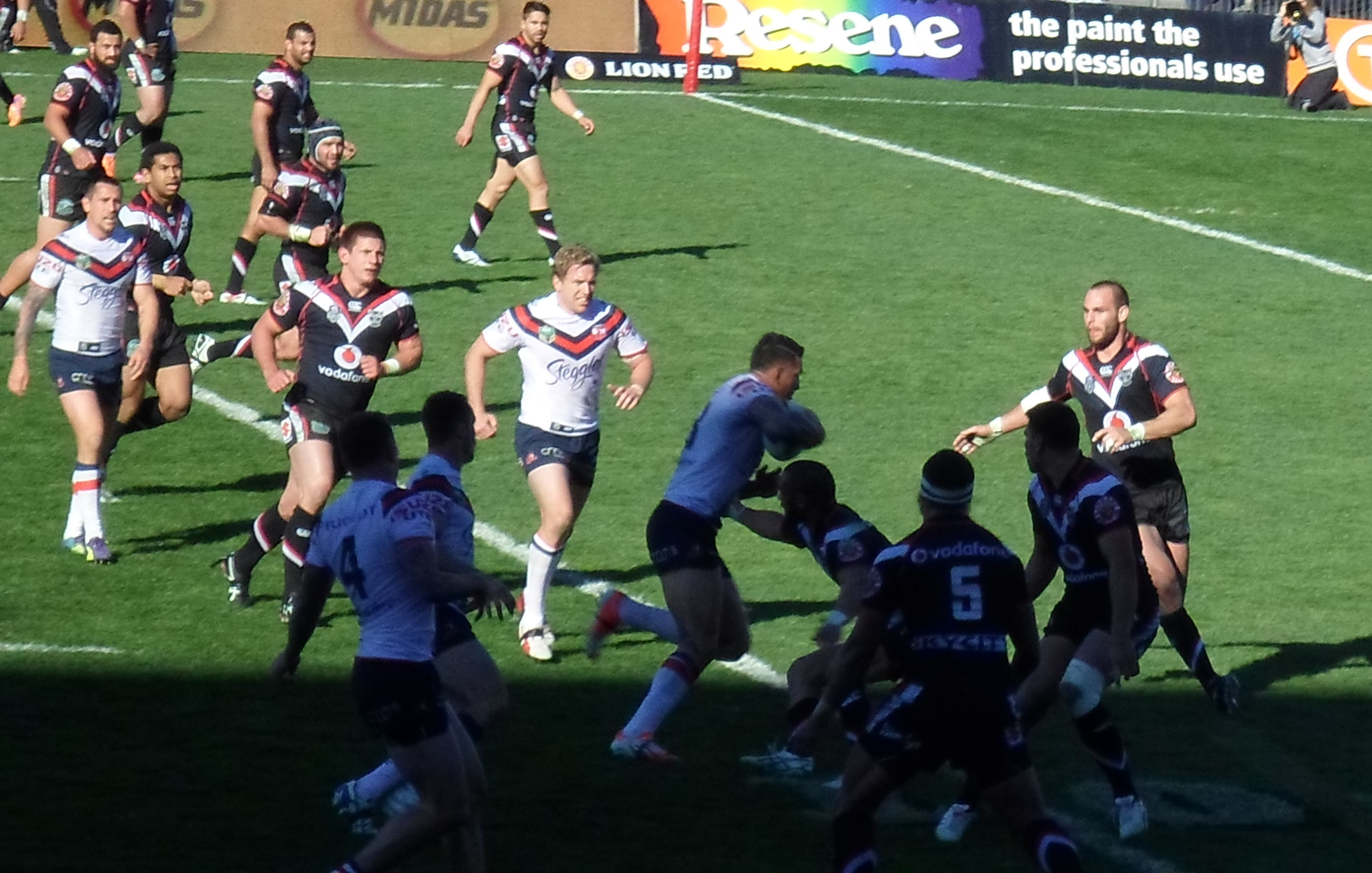
Roosters fan favourite Sonny Bill Williams on attack against the Warriors in 2014, surrounded by club icons Mitchell Pearce and Mitchell Aubusson (facing camera)

The 2011 and 2012 seasons for the Roosters were below average, missing out on the top 8 during both seasons. Brian Smith was sacked as coach of the Roosters afterward and was soon replaced by Trent Robinson for the 2013 season.

== The "Robbo" Resurrection ==
The arrival of new coach Trent Robinson wasn't the only chance for the Tri-Colours. Club captain Braith Anasta, who departed from the Roosters to the Tigers, was replaced by Golden Boot-winning fullback Anthony Minichiello who had played for the Roosters since 2000. With recruits including speedster Michael Jennings, five-eighth James Maloney, Rugby World Cup winner Sonny Bill Williams and tough forwards Sam Moa and Luke O'Donnell, 2013 proved an excellent season for the Roosters. The club took out the minor premiership thanks to a 24–12 victory over arch-rivals South Sydney in front of over 59,000 fans in the final round. This was followed by a 4–0 victory over the Manly Sea Eagles in the qualifying final, which was the lowest-scoring finals match since 1992. This was the sixth time that season that the Roosters had held the opposition scoreless, which is an NRL record. That victory sent the Roosters into a preliminary final against the Newcastle Knights, with the Roosters prevailing 40–14 to earn a spot in the grand final. In the grand final, the Roosters won their 13th premiership with a 26–18 victory against the Manly Warringah Sea Eagles, with quality performances from Sonny Bill Williams and James Maloney who finished with two try assists and having kicked 5/5 goals. As a result, Trent Robinson became the first coach since Ricky Stuart to win the premiership in their first year as a first grade coach in Australia.

2014 began with club legend Brad Fittler making a surprise appearance in the inaugural NRL Nines at Eden Park, scoring a 70m intercept despite being 42 years old. A week later, Sydney claimed their third World Club Challenge, soundly beating Wigan Warriors 36–14, with Michael Jennings scoring a hat-trick. The Roosters claimed the minor premiership but were beaten in the preliminary final. This match was notable for being Anthony Minichiello's 302nd first grade game for the club, surpassing Luke Ricketson's previous record of 301. This would be Minichiello's final game for the Roosters and he also finished as the club's leading try scorer. The Roosters claimed their third successive minor premiership in 2015, but late season injuries to Mitchell Pearce and Jared Waerea-Hargreaves ultimately affected the club and they again lost in the preliminary final.

In 2016, Michael Jennings and James Maloney departed the club. Injuries to Boyd Cordner and Jared Waerea-Hargreaves, and an eight-week suspension to star halfback Mitchell Pearce hurt the Roosters, with the foundation club winning just one of its first eight games. The Roosters were unable to recover from this and finished the season in 15th place, recording just six wins.

After this, Luke Keary was signed from arch rivals South Sydney for the 2017 season to add experience to the halves, whilst fullback Michael Gordon came aboard to be the club's goal kicker. Sydney then won the Auckland Nines at Eden Park and finishing the regular season in second place. Things looked promising after the Roosters beat the Broncos in a finals match including a solo try to young back Latrell Mitchell, but the club missed out on a grand final appearance, losing to the Cowboys in the preliminary final. It was the third time in four years that the Roosters were knocked out in the preliminary final.

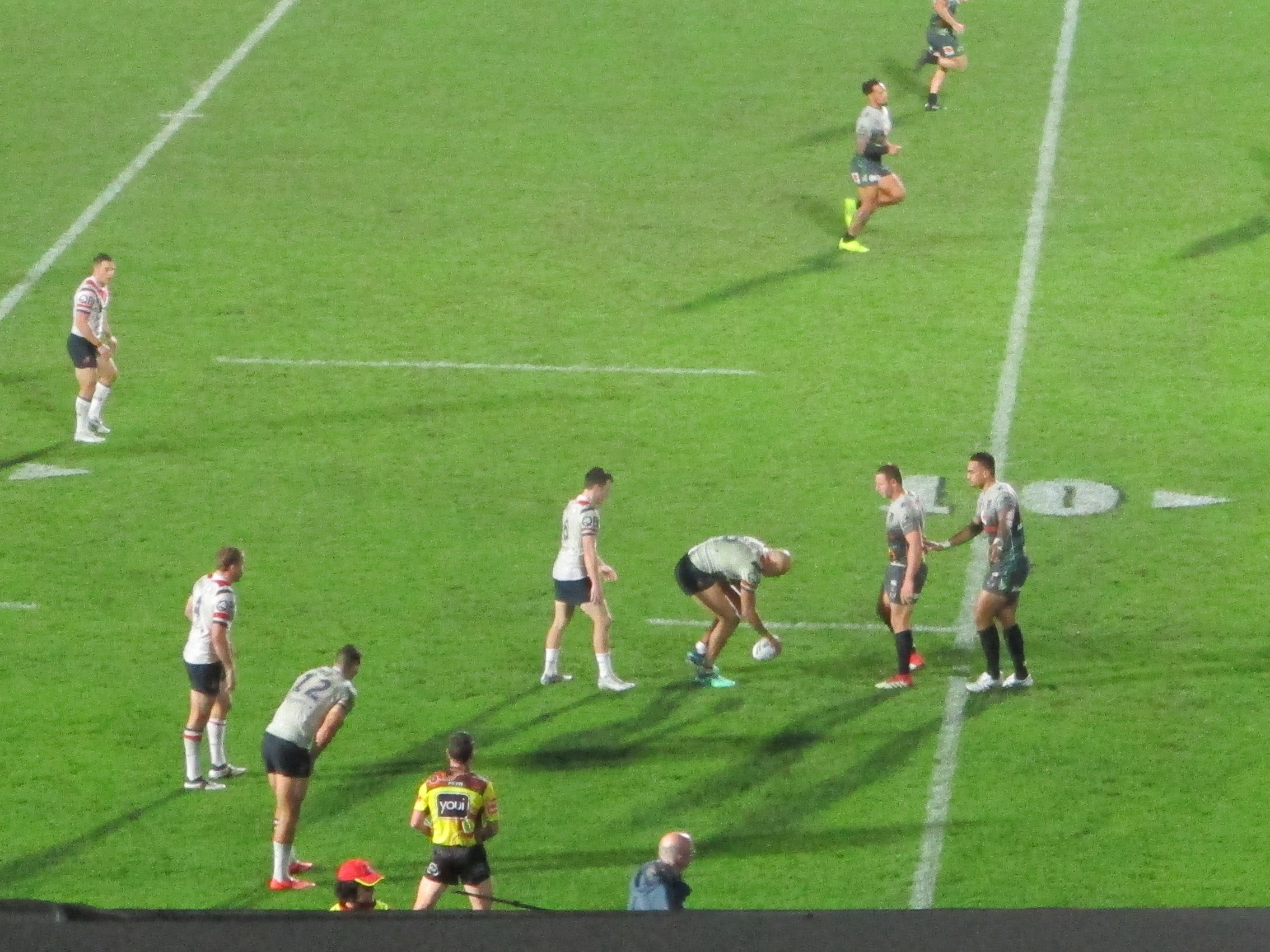
Blake Ferguson plays the ball to Luke Keary, at Mt Smart Stadium, 2018

== "Something...that will be remembered for 100 years" ==
The Roosters hit the transfer market, looking for players that could help win the elusive premiership. Young fullback James Tedesco was lured to Bondi, and legendary Queensland halfback Cooper Cronk signed after too, replacing the club's long-term halfback Mitchell Pearce for 2018. These signings lead most observers to believe that anything less than a grand final triumph would be a failure for the club in 2018. After a slow start to the season, the Tri-Colours won 12 of their last 16 matches, finishing off the regular season with a 44-10 thrashing of the Parramatta Eels to win the minor premiership. The Roosters won against the Sharks in week one of the finals, which set up a preliminary finals match up against rivals South Sydney. In the last ever sports match at the Sydney Football Stadium, the Roosters defeated their nemesis 12–4. Luke Keary starred against his former club, playing the role of both halves after Cooper Cronk suffered a broken scapula early in the match. The Roosters were in another grand final, this time against defending premiers the Melbourne Storm. For the Roosters, the buildup focused on whether star recruit Cronk would be fit enough to play, with most in the media believing that the Storm would be too good for the Roosters in the final and that Cronk was no chance of playing. They were proven wrong on both counts. Cooper Cronk played 78 minutes, with Sydney winning 21–6 to claim their 14th premiership. Luke Keary was awarded the Clive Churchill Medal thanks to his performance. The victory gave coach Trent Robinson his second premiership, with players Daniel Tupou, Mitchell Aubusson, Boyd Cordner, Jared Waerea-Hargreaves and Jake Friend all winning their second premiership for the club.

2019 offered the Roosters the chance to do something special - win back to back premierships. The Roosters had not done this since 1974–75, and it hadn't been done by any club since the Brisbane Broncos in 1992–93. Many thought that with the salary cap and the evenness of the competition that it was near impossible for a club to win back to back premierships in the NRL era. The Roosters campaign started in England, beating the Wigan Warriors 20–8 in the World Club Challenge. New signing Brett Morris was named man of the match, thanks in part to his hat-trick of tries. Back in Australia, the quest for consecutive titles would be impacted by the club moving its home matches to the Sydney Cricket Ground whilst Allianz Stadium was being demolished and rebuilt. The Roosters would lose their first match back at the SCG, going down to the Rabbitohs in Round One. It would be the Tricolours' only loss at the venue all season, with centre Latrell Mitchell easily outscoring opposition teams at there. The Roosters were on track for back to back titles, finishing the regular season in second spot, and demolishing the Rabbitohs 30–6 in the first week of the finals. This set up a preliminary final matchup against minor premiers the Melbourne Storm, in which the Roosters prevailed 14–6. Now, only the Canberra Raiders stood between the Roosters and immortality. With tries to Sam Verrills and James Tedesco, the Roosters overcame the controversial sin-binning of the retiring Cooper Cronk to win 14–8. Coach Trent Robinson told his players that they had "put something in the jersey that will be remembered for 100 years."

== Team song ==
The current song is labelled "Rooster Man", a revamp of the original tune Macho Man performed by the Village People. However the traditional club song, "Here come the Roosters", favoured by many of the traditional fans, goes as follows:

Easts know how to play the game, they play it hard and fair,
Easts know how to win the game, they win more than their share.
They're great to see in action, these boys who show the way,
Put the Roosters on the field, they'll show you how to play.
Here come the Roosters, the best we've ever seen,
The red, white and bluesters, the Eastern Suburbs team.

"Easts to win" shout the cry that everybody knows,
If you play this football game beware the Roosters crow.
They're great to see in action, these boys who show the way,
Put the roosters on the field, they'll show you how to play.
Here come the Roosters, the best we've ever seen,
The red, white and bluesters, the Eastern Suburbs team.
