= 1961 Eastern Suburbs season =

← 1960	1962 →

Eastern Suburbs (now known as the Sydney Roosters) competed in their 54th New South Wales Rugby League season in 1961 finishing the season in 5th position.

== Details ==
The Eastern Suburbs line-up for the 1961 season was: • John Andrew • Ken Ashcroft • Boyce Beeton • P. Dickenson • Terry Fearnley • Don Fenton • Peter Gallagher • Jack Gibson • Ron Hanson • Ron Keyes

== 1961 NSWRL ladder ==
	Team	Pld	W	D	L	PF	PA	PD	Pts
1	Western Suburbs	18	15	0	3	390	181	+209	30
2	St. George	18	15	0	3	367	167	+200	30
3	Manly-Warringah	18	10	0	8	294	209	+85	20
4	Balmain	18	10	0	8	281	292	-11	20
5	Eastern Suburbs	18	9	1	8	290	211	+79	19
6	North Sydney	18	9	0	9	273	298	-25	18
7	South Sydney	18	7	0	11	237	325	-88	14
8	Canterbury-Bankstown	18	6	1	11	197	284	-87	13
9	Newtown	18	5	0	13	236	436	-200	10
10	Parramatta	18	3	0	15	203	365	-162	6

== 1961 Premiership Results ==
- Round 1 - Sunday, 16 April 1961.

Eastern Suburbs 25 defeated South Sydney 11(W. Stokes Try; R. Taylor 4 Goals) played at the Sydney Cricket Ground

- Round 2 - Sunday, 23 April 1961.

Eastern Suburbs 34 defeated North Sydney 21(M. Maher, P. Cuneo, Irvine Tries; Carlson 6 Goals) played at the Sydney Sports Ground.
