= Kevin Brown (rugby league, born 1933) =

Australian rugby league footballer

Personal information
- Full name: Kevin Langton Brown
- Born: 3 April 1933
- Died: 6 October 2000 (aged 67) Condobolin, New South Wales, Australia

Playing information
- Position: Prop
Club
Years	Team	Pld	T	G	FG	P
1953–61	St. George	129	33	0	0	99
Representative
Years	Team	Pld	T	G	FG	P
1957–58	New South Wales	2	0	0	0	0
1958	NSW City	1	0	0	0	0
- Source: Whiticker/Hudson

Kevin Langton Brown (1933–2000) was an Australian rugby league footballer who played in the 1950s and 1960s. He was a three-time premiership winning prop-forward with the St George Dragons.

== Career ==
Kevin Brown was a prop-forward and played for the St George Dragons for nine seasons between 1953 and 1961. He made four grand final appearances for the Dragons, initially losing the 1953 match, but winning premierships with St George in 1956, 1957 and 1961. Brown represented New South Wales on two occasions between 1957 and 1958. Injuries finally curtailed his first grade career resulting in his retirement after winning the grand final in 1961. He later captain-coached in Condobolin, New South Wales before hanging up his boots in the mid-1960s.

He also player with Wagga Magpies and Temora Dragons. Played in the Temora Grand Final Side coached by Doug Rickertson in 1970 against West Wyalong, beaten by one point. Also coached the Temora Reserve Grade team to the grand final in the same year. That team was beaten by Griffith Black and Whites after captain Brendan Michael was carted off with a broken forearm in the first five minutes of that game.
