= John Stathers =

Australian rugby league footballer

Johnny Stathers
Personal information
- Full name: John Frank Stathers
- Born: Sydney, New South Wales, Australia

Playing information
- Position: Centre
Club
Years	Team	Pld	T	G	FG	P
1959–62	St. George	20	5	0	0	15
- Source: Whiticker/Hudson.

John Frank Stathers is an Australian former rugby league footballer who played in the 1950s and 1960s. He was a versatile back who won a premiership with St George Dragons in the New South Wales Rugby League competition.

== Playing career ==
A St. George junior from the Renown United club, Stathers played three first grade seasons with the St George Dragons between 1959 and 1961. He won a premiership with Saints when he played centre alongside Reg Gasnier in the 1960 Grand Final and he also won a Thirsd Grade premiership with the Dragons in 1957.

He suffered a career ending broken leg in 1963, and retired from football to pursue his career as a teacher. He was later promoted to acting Director of the New South Wales Department of Sport and Recreation, under Minister Ken Booth.
