= Doug Ricketson =

Australian rugby league footballer (1939–2019)

Personal information
- Full name: Douglas Dennis Ricketson
- Born: 8 December 1939
- Died: 18 December 2019 (aged 80) Sydney, New South Wales, Australia

Playing information
- Position: Centre
Club
Years	Team	Pld	T	G	FG	P
1960–63	Eastern Suburbs	60	9	0	0	27
1967	Penrith Panthers	3	0	0	0	0
	Total	63	9	0	0	27
Representative
Years	Team	Pld	T	G	FG	P
1964	NSW Country	1	0	0	0	0
- Source: As of 27 June 2019
- Relatives: Luke Ricketson (son)

Douglas Ricketson (8 December 1939 – 18 December 2019) was an Australian professional rugby league footballer who played in the 1960s. He played in the New South Wales Rugby League (NSWRL) competition. He played for the Eastern Suburbs and Penrith clubs and was the father of Luke Ricketson.

== Playing career ==
A centre, Ricketson was a member of the Eastern Suburbs side that was defeated by St George in the 1960 Grand Final. He also represented Sydney in a match against Great Britain. In 1967, Ricketson played for Penrith in their debut season in the NSWRFL premiership before a knee injury brought about an end to his career.

== Post playing ==
Formerly an athletics coach at Waverley College, in Sydney, Ricketson spent many years coaching in country areas including Temora, where his daughter Kylie was born, Forster where his son Luke was born, and South Grafton.

== Death ==
Ricketson died in Cronulla, New South Wales following a long illness on 18 December 2019 at the age of 80.
