= Bruce Ranier =

Australian rugby league footballer

Personal information
- Full name: Bruce Henry Ranier

Playing information
- Position: Halfback
Club
Years	Team	Pld	T	G	FG	P
1956–58	South Sydney	24	2	1	0	8
1959–63	Eastern Suburbs	75	5	0	0	15
	Total	99	7	1	0	23
- Source: As of 18 April 2019

Bruce Ranier was an Australian professional rugby league footballer who played in the 1950s and 1960s. He played for Eastern Suburbs and South Sydney in the New South Wales Rugby League (NSWRL) competition.

== Playing career ==
Ranier began his first grade career for South Sydney in 1956. The club would go on to reach the preliminary final that year but were defeated by Balmain 36-33 ending Souths run of successive grand final appearances. The following season, Souths again reached the preliminary final but were defeated by Manly-Warringah. Ranier's final season at Souths saw the club finish third last on the table as by that stage most of the stars in the side had either retired or moved to other clubs.

Ranier then joined arch rivals Eastern Suburbs in 1959. In 1960, Eastern Suburbs reached the NSWRL grand final against St George. Ranier played at halfback as St George were never troubled by Easts winning their 5th straight premiership 31–6 at the Sydney Cricket Ground. Ranier retired from playing at the end of 1963 having made a total of 75 appearances for Easts.

Bruce Ranier was the nephew of another rugby league player, Ernest Ranier.
