= Mark Patch =

Australian rugby league footballer

Personal information
- Full name: Albert Mark Patch
- Born: 23 February 1933 Lismore, New South Wales, Australia
- Died: 17 August 2015 (aged 82) Yamba, New South Wales, Australia

Playing information
- Position: Prop
Club
Years	Team	Pld	T	G	FG	P
1956–61	Western Suburbs	69	3	0	0	9
Representative
Years	Team	Pld	T	G	FG	P
1957–59	New South Wales	3	0	0	0	0
1957	NSW City	1	0	0	0	0

Albert Mark Patch (1933–2015) was an Australian rugby league footballer who played in the 1950s and 1960s.

== Career ==
Originally from Lismore, New South Wales, Patch picked up a contact from Western Suburbs in 1956 and stayed with them for five seasons until the end of 1961.

Patch was a fierce forward and enforcer for Wests during this period, and played in two losing grand finals: 1958 and 1961. He represented New South Wales on three occasions in 1957 and 1959. After retiring from Sydney, Patch joined Yass as a Captain-coach for some years.

He lived in retirement in the New South Wales north coast town of Yamba, and died there on 17 August 2015, aged 82.
