= Ernest Ranier =

Australian rugby league footballer and coach

Personal information
- Full name: Ernest Edward Ranier
- Born: 29 October 1908 London, England, United Kingdom
- Died: 18 June 1994 (aged 85) Bondi, New South Wales, Australia

Playing information
- Position: Wing
Club
Years	Team	Pld	T	G	FG	P
1931–33	Newtown	25	10	0	0	30
1936–37	St. George	16	6	1	0	20
1942	Newtown	1	0	0	0	0
	Total	42	16	1	0	50
Representative
Years	Team	Pld	T	G	FG	P
1932	New South Wales	1	1	0	0	3

Ernest Edward Ranier (1908-1994) was an Australian rugby league footballer who played in the 1930s and 1940s.

== Playing career ==
London born, Ern Ranier arrived in Australia as a three-year-old in 1911 and was brought up in the Newtown area.

A winger with a notorious turn of speed, Ranier was graded at Newtown in 1930 and was in the First Grade team a year later. In 1934 he went to Cowra, New South Wales to take up a captain/coach position and in 1935 he was playing for Inverell, New South Wales.

In 1936 he returned to Sydney and he played two seasons at St. George. In 1938, Ranier joined Eastern Suburbs but failed to make First Grade, and in 1939 he played in the City Houses competition for Dunlop-Perdriau.

Ranier was selected to play for New South Wales for one representative match in 1932.

Ranier enlisted in the Australian Army in late 1939 and during a brief home visit in 1942, he turned out for his old team Newtown on one occasion in first grade.

== Death ==
Ranier died on 18 June 1994 in Bondi, New South Wales aged 85.
