= Luke Ricketson =

Australia & Ireland international rugby league footballer

Luke "Ricko" Ricketson
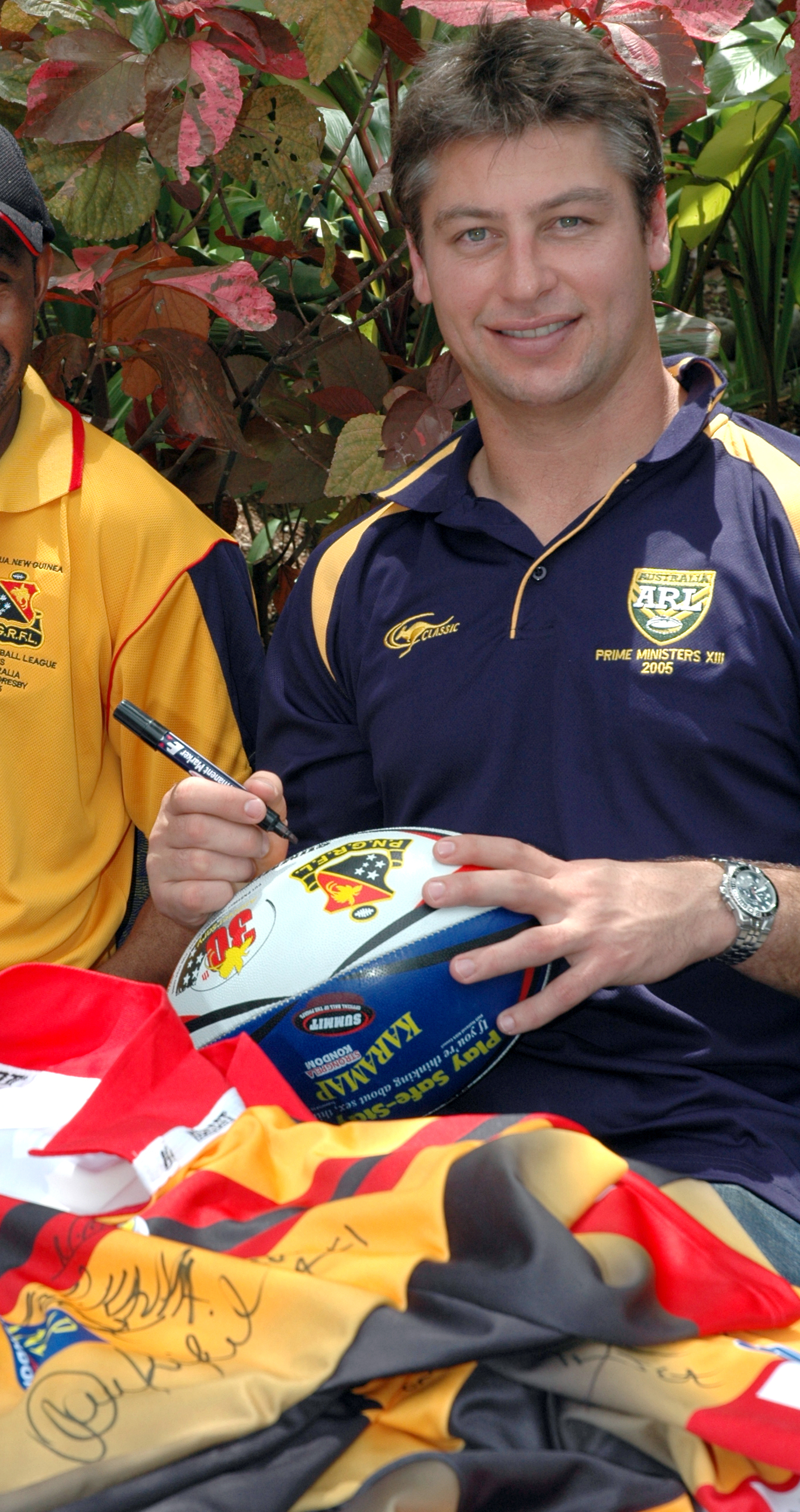

Personal information
- Full name: Luke Douglas Ricketson
- Born: 5 February 1973 (age 53) Forster, New South Wales, Australia

Playing information
- Height: 190 cm (6 ft 3 in)
- Weight: 102 kg (16 st 1 lb)
- Position: Lock, Second-row
Club
Years	Team	Pld	T	G	FG	P
1991–05	Sydney Roosters	301	40	1	0	162
Representative
Years	Team	Pld	T	G	FG	P
1996–03	City NSW	3	0	0	0	0
1999–03	New South Wales	10	2	0	0	8
2000	Ireland	4	0	0	0	0
2003	Australia	6	2	0	0	8
2005	Prime Minister's XIII	1	0	1	0	2
- Father: Doug Ricketson

Luke Ricketson (born 5 February 1973) is an Australian former professional rugby league footballer who played in the 1990s and 2000s. An Australian and Ireland international, and New South Wales State of Origin representative back-row forward, he played his entire club football career for the Sydney Roosters of the National Rugby League (NRL).

== Early life ==
Ricketson was born in Forster, New South Wales, Australia.

Son of former Easts player, Doug Ricketson. He started playing junior rugby league at the age of seven for Bondi United in 1980. He was then graded with Eastern Suburbs as a local junior, debuting in first grade in round 22 of 1991 season.

== Playing career ==
Ricketson made his first grade debut for Eastern Suburbs in round 22 of the 1991 NSWRL season against Penrith which ended in a 42-8 loss. Ricketson was one of the ever present players at Eastern Suburbs during a tough period in the clubs history where they continually missed out on the finals. Ricketson started out his First Grade career as a centre, and gradually moved closer to the action in the middle of the field as his career went on, generally playing in the centres until he was moved into the second row in 1996. Ricketson played 14 games for the club in 1996 as they qualified for the finals. It was their first finals appearance since 1987. The club would subsequently qualify for the finals in 1997, 1998 and 1999.

Ricketson played at lock for the Sydney Roosters in their 2000 NRL Grand Final loss to the Brisbane Broncos.

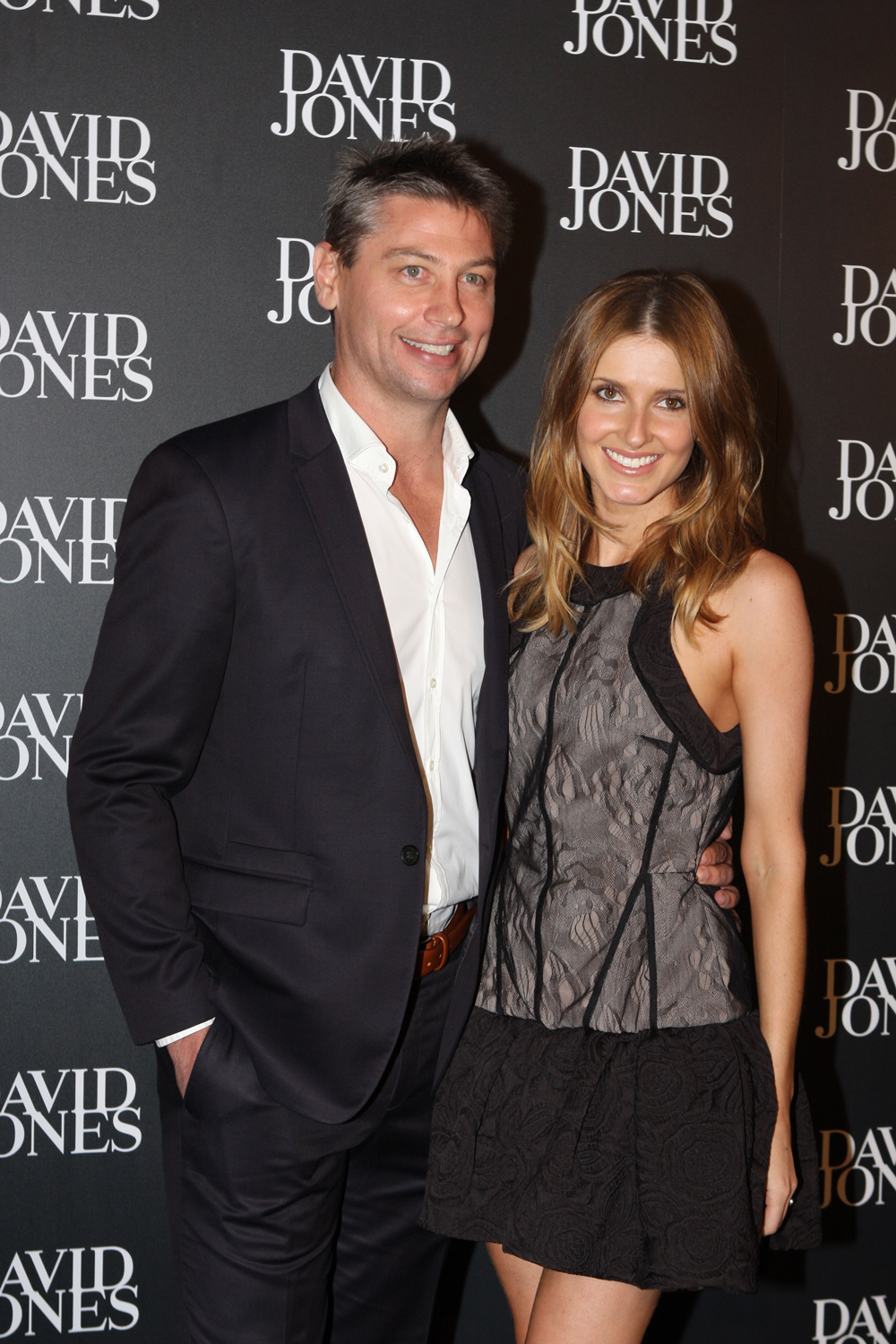
Luke Ricketson with Kate Waterhouse on a red carpet

In 2002, Ricketson broke the record held by Roosters club legend Kevin Hastings (217) for the most club appearances. In 2014, Ricketson's eventual 301 caps, achieved upon his retirement in 2005 was overtaken by Anthony Minichiello (302). This record was subsequently surpassed by Mitchell Aubusson (306) in 2020 and Jared Waerea-Hargreaves in 2024.

Ricketson played for the Sydney Roosters at lock forward in their 2002 NRL Grand Final victory against the New Zealand Warriors. Having won the 2002 NRL Premiership, the Sydney Roosters traveled to England to play the 2003 World Club Challenge against Super League champions, St Helens R.F.C. Ricketson played at lock forward in Sydney's victory. In the 2003 NRL grand final, he played at lock forward for the Sydney Roosters in their loss to Penrith. Ricketson missed the 2004 NRL grand final due to suspension.

Ricketson retired from rugby league after the 2005 NRL season having played 301 games for the Sydney Roosters, the last season as captain. He played his 300th (and penultimate) game in round 25, 2005, against the Brisbane Broncos at Suncorp Stadium; the Sydney Roosters marked the milestone by winning the match 17–10.

=== Representative career ===
In 1996, Ricketson was first picked for City Origin. He played again for City in 1997 but had to wait until 1999 to make his State of Origin début for NSW, coming off the bench in all three games.

He made his international début when he played four games for Ireland at the 2000 Rugby League World Cup.

Ricketson made his début for Australia in 2003 playing in two tests at lock against New Zealand. After that he was selected to go on the 2003 Kangaroo tour, on which he played all three tests against Great Britain as Australia retained The Ashes winning all three games. Ricketson scored two tries in the last test at the McAlpine Stadium in Huddersfield.

== Post playing ==
He appeared on the fourth series on the Australian version of Dancing with the Stars.

== Personal life ==
Ricketson is married to journalist Kate Waterhouse who is the daughter of horse trainer Gai Waterhouse. They have 2 children.
