= Billy McNamara =

Australian rugby league footballer

Personal information
- Full name: William McNamara

Playing information
- Position: Five-eighth
Club
Years	Team	Pld	T	G	FG	P
1954–55	St. George	23	1	0	0	3
1957–62	Eastern Suburbs	52	5	0	0	15
	Total	75	6	0	0	18
- Source: As of 18 April 2019

Billy McNamara was an Australian professional rugby league footballer who played in the 1950s and 1960s. He played for Eastern Suburbs and St George in the New South Wales Rugby League (NSWRL) competition.

== Playing career ==
McNamara began his first grade career for St George in 1954 after winning the Third grade premiership the year before. McNamara played in both of the club's finals games as they reached the preliminary final but were defeated by Newtown. The following season, St George again reached the preliminary final but were defeated by South Sydney. Due to the residency rules at the time, McNamara missed the entire 1956 season before he was allowed to sign with Eastern Suburbs. McNamara would leave St George a year before the club would go on to win 11 straight premierships.

In 1960, Eastern Suburbs reached the NSWRL grand final against McNamara's former club St George. McNamara played at five-eighth as St George were never troubled by Easts winning their 5th straight premiership 31–6 at the Sydney Cricket Ground. McNamara retired following the conclusion of the 1962 season.
