= Jack Fitzgerald (rugby league) =

Australian rugby league footballer and coach

Personal information
- Full name: John Leo Fitzgerald
- Born: 4 January 1925 Lismore, New South Wales, Australia
- Died: 19 March 1965 (aged 40)

Playing information
- Position: Wing
Club
Years	Team	Pld	T	G	FG	P
1949–55	Western Suburbs	60	21	0	0	63

Coaching information
Club
Years	Team	Gms	W	D	L	W%
1961–64	Western Suburbs	80	53	2	25	66

Jack Fitzgerald (1925-1965) was an Australian professional rugby league footballer who played in the 1940s and 1950s, and coached in the 1960s. He played for Western Suburbs as a winger and later coached the club from 1961 to 1964.

== Playing career ==
Fitzgerald began his career with Western Suburbs in 1949. In 1952, Fitzgerald was a member of the Western Suburbs side which claimed their fourth and final premiership defeating South Sydney in the grand final, with Fitzgerald scoring a try. Fitzgerald played for three more seasons before retiring as a player.

== Coaching career ==
Fitzgerald began his coaching career in the lower grades at Western Suburbs until taking over as first grade coach in 1961. In his first year as coach, Fitzgerald won the minor premiership with Wests as they made the grand final against the all conquering St George side. Wests lost the match 22–0 at the Sydney Cricket Ground. Fitzgerald then coached the club as they reached the 1962 and 1963 grand finals against St George losing on both occasions. This would be the last time that Western Suburbs would make a grand final as a stand-alone club. Fitzgerald coached for one last season in 1964 before stepping down. He died in 1965 aged 40 after a weeks long battle with vasculitis.
