= Eastern Suburbs Rugby Union Football Club =

Eastern Suburbs Rugby Union Football Club may refer to:

- Eastern Suburbs District RUFC (NSW), est. 1900, based in Sydney, Australia
- Eastern Suburbs RUFC (Canberra), est. 1938, based in Canberra, Australia
- Easts Tigers Rugby Union, est. 1947, based in Brisbane, Queensland, Australia
- Eastern Suburbs RUFC (Tasmania), est. 1964, based in Warrane, Tasmania, Australia
