= Brian Wright (rugby league) =

Australian rugby league footballer

Brian Victor Wright
Personal information
- Full name: Brian Victor Wright
- Born: 28 February 1935 (age 91) Sydney, New South Wales, Australia

Playing information
Club
Years	Team	Pld	T	G	FG	P
1957–58	South Sydney	13	6	0	0	18
1960–61	Eastern Suburbs	29	6	0	0	18
	Total	42	12	0	0	36

Brian Wright is an Australian former rugby league footballer who played for South Sydney and Eastern Suburbs in the New South Wales Rugby League premiership competition.

Wright began his New South Wales Rugby League (NSWRL) career with South Sydney in 1957 making 15 first grade appearances with that club. In 1960 the forward joined Eastern Suburbs, playing 29 matches in his two years at that club.

Wright was a member of the Easts side that went down to St George in the 1960 Grand Final. He is one of only a handful of players to be sent off in a Grand Final after Wright and St George's forward, Kevin Ryan, were dismissed for fighting midway through the second half of the match.

== Career playing statistics ==
=== Point scoring summary ===
Games	Tries	Goals	F/G	Points
42	12	-	-	36
