= Bob Heffernan =

Australian rugby league footballer

Robert Heffernan
Personal information
- Full name: Robert Heffernan
- Born: Australia

Playing information
- Position: Second-row
Club
Years	Team	Pld	T	G	FG	P
1957–1964	Eastern Suburbs	79

Robert Heffernan (Australia) was a rugby league footballer in Australia's major competition - the New South Wales Rugby League (NSWRL).

Heffernan, who played for Eastern Suburbs side, played in 79 matches for that club in the years 1957–64. A second rower, he was a member of the Easts side that went down to St George in the 1960 Grand Final.
