= Dick See =

Australian rugby league footballer

Personal information
- Full name: Richard See
- Born: 7 January 1935; Bronte, New South Wales, Australia
- Died: 24 December 2018 (aged 83); Waverley, New South Wales, Australia

Playing information
- Position: Lock, Second-row
Club
Years	Team	Pld	T	G	FG	P
1956–63	Eastern Suburbs	91	2	0	0	6
1964	Newtown	7	2	0	0	6
	Total	98	4	0	0	12
- Source: As of 12 February 2019

Richard See (1935–2018) was a rugby league footballer who competed in the Australian New South Wales Rugby League premiership (NSWRL).

== Rugby League career ==
A long serving Lock forward, See played for Eastern Suburbs in one of the bleakest periods of the club's existence.

See played for Easts between 1956 and 1963, in those years the club only made the semis on one occasion. Eastern Suburbs went all the way to the grand final in 1960, only to be defeated by St George 31–6.

See also spent one season playing for the Newtown club in 1964.

== Water Polo career ==
Dick See played for the Bronte Water Polo club in the Sydney first grade competition. He played alongside the Thornett brothers and won the Sydney first grade competition in the 1958/59, 1959/60, 1960/61, 1961/62, and 1970/71 seasons.

See’s greatest individual accolade was representing NSW at the 1956 Australian championships.

See played water polo against Easts teammate Bill Roney. Roney represented the Bondi Water Polo club throughout his career.
