= Bill Roney =

Australian rugby league footballer

Personal information
- Full name: William Roney
- Born: 21 July 1938 (age 87) Sydney, New South Wales, Australia

Playing information
- Position: Centre
Club
Years	Team	Pld	T	G	FG	P
1959–62	Eastern Suburbs	52	15	0	0	45
1963–64	Parramatta	27	7	0	0	21
	Total	79	22	0	0	66
Representative
Years	Team	Pld	T	G	FG	P
1961	NSW City	1	0	0	0	0
- Source: As of 18 April 2019

Bill Roney is an Australian former rugby league footballer who played in the 1950s and 1960s. He played for Eastern Suburbs and Parramatta in the New South Wales Rugby League (NSWRL) competition.

== Background ==
Roney was born in Sydney, New South Wales, Australia and played his junior rugby league for Clovelly.

== Rugby League career ==
Roney made his first grade debut for Eastern Suburbs in 1959. In 1960, Eastern Suburbs reached the NSWRL grand final against St George. Roney played at centre as St George were never troubled by Easts winning their 5th straight premiership 31–6 at the Sydney Cricket Ground. In 1961, Roney was selected to play for NSW City. At club level, Easts finished just outside the top 5 in Roney's 2 final seasons at the club.

In 1963, Roney joined Parramatta. Between 1947 and 1961, the club had finished last 9 times but under the arrival of coach Ken Kearney became a competitive side. In Roney's first year at Parramatta, the club reached the preliminary final but were defeated by St George. In 1964, Parramatta enjoyed their best season since entering the competition finishing the regular season in 2nd place. The club again reached the preliminary final stage but were defeated by Balmain. Roney retired following the conclusion of the 1964 season.

== Water Polo career ==
Roney played for the Bondi Water Polo club in the Sydney first grade competition. He was a part of Bondi's premiership winning seasons in 1955/56, 1956/57, and 1960/61.

Roney’s greatest individual accolade was representing NSW at the 1960 Australian championships. Playing alongside Dick Thornett and John Thornett, NSW finished 2nd behind Victoria at the championships.

See played water polo against Easts teammate Dick See. See represented the Bronte Water Polo club throughout his career.

== Post playing ==
Roney later went on to become a doctor and a surgeon and ran a practice in Sydney's Eastern Suburbs.
