= Boyce Beeton =

Australian rugby league footballer

Boyce Lionel Beeton (1939–1997) was a rugby league footballer in Australia's major competition, the New South Wales Rugby League.

== Career ==
Boyce Beeton played for the Eastern Suburbs club making 50 appearances and scoring 25 tries in the years (1960–63). A speedy winger, Beeton played in Roosters Grand Final side that was defeated by St George in the 1960 Grand Final.

Boyce Beeton is the 508th player to play for the Roosters.

He retired from the game after the 1963 season concluded.
