= John Andrew (rugby league) =

Australian rugby league footballer

John 'Straw' Andrew was a rugby league footballer in Australia's major competition, the New South Wales Rugby League (NSWRL), during the early 1960s.

== Career ==
Andrew played for the Eastern Suburbs club, playing 38 matches across three seasons from 1960 to 1962. A fullback, 'Straw' was a member of the Easts side that went down to St George in the 1960 NSWRL Grand Final. Andrew had to be stretchered from the field in that match after suffering a broken leg.

In 1962, the fullback experienced an even more severe injury when he broke his neck after being upended and driven head first into the ground in a spear tackle.

He retired from rugby league soon after.
