= List of Sydney Roosters players =

There have been over 1,200 rugby league footballers who have played for the Sydney Roosters in the premiership since its foundation in 1908. They are listed in order of cap number, with the first going to the club's inaugural captain, Harry 'Jersey' Flegg. The Sydney Roosters are one of only two extant clubs from the League's foundation year of 1908, and are the only one to have played continuously in all seasons since, making their players' register one of the most extensive. Only first grade stats are counted and non first grade stats do not apply on this list. The list has been updated to ensure it mirrors the Roosters Honour Roll.

== List of players ==
- NRL List updated after the Sam Verrills signing.
- NRLW List updated after the Roosters won the 2026 NRLW Premiership (3rd title).
- Men's and women's players highlighted in yellow are contracted with the Roosters for this years 2026 NRL and NRLW seasons.

Cap	Name	Nationality	Position	Seasons	Games	Tries	Goals	FG	Points
1	Harry 'Jersey' Flegg	Australia	Prop	1908–1909	11	3	–	–	9
2	Herb Brackenreg	Australia	Prop	1908	11	2	17	–	40
3	David Brown	Australia	Centre	1908–1910	21	2	–	–	6
4	Lou D'Alpuget	Australia	Halfback	1908–1909	12	2	–	–	6
5	Dan Frawley	Australia	Wing	1908–1915	71	56	20	1	210
6	Fred Fry	Australia	Fullback	1908	5	–	–	–	–
7	Lou Jones	Australia	Prop	1908–1909	11	1	6	–	15
8	Bob Mable	Australia	Second-row	1908–1911, 1913	28	2	–	–	6
9	Larry 'Jersey' O'Malley	Australia	Prop	1908–1909, 1911–1914	53	6	–	–	18
10	Sandy Pearce	Australia	Hooker	1908–1921	157	5	1	–	17
11	Albert Rosenfeld	Australia	Five-eighth	1908–1909	12	6	1	–	20
12	William Smith	Australia	Centre	1908, 1912	10	2	–	–	6
13	Johnno Stuntz	Australia	Wing	1908–1910	6	7	–	–	21
15	Horrie Miller	Australia	Wing	1908–1909	16	18	–	1	56
14	Percy MacNamara	Australia	Centre	1908–1909	15	2	–	1	8
16	Harry Thomson	Australia	Second-row	1908	5	1	–	–	3
17	Harold Kelley	Australia	Second-row	1908–1910	17	2	1	–	8
18	Dally Messenger	Australia	Centre	1908, 1910–1913	48	21	150	8	379
19	Herb Woodhill	Australia	Centre	1908	1	–	–	–	–
20	George Green	Australia	Second-row	1908–1911, 1914	30	–	2	–	4
21	Alfred Playfair	Australia	Fullback	1908	1	–	–	–	–
22	Joe Shakespeare	Australia	Centre	1908–1909	2	–	–	–	–
23	Percy White	Australia	Prop	1908, 1910–1916	89	9	1	–	29
24	William Leslie	Australia	Second-row	1908	1	–	–	–	–
25	Mick Frawley	Australia	Prop	1908–1912	44	14	1	–	44
26	Bill King	Australia	Fullback	1908–1910	25	–	18	1	38
27	Ted Briscoe	Australia	Second-row	1908–1909	4	1	–	–	3
28	Tom Bruce	Australia	Wing	1909–1912	29	4	–	–	12
29	Eddie Griffiths	Australia	Second-row	1909–1912	47	5	2	–	19
30	Arthur Lawes	Australia	Centre	1909	2	2	–	–	6
31	Arthur Surridge	Australia	Second-row	1909	8	3	15	1	41
32	Wally Webb	Australia	Halfback	1909	7	2	–	–	6
33	Joe Oates	Australia	Prop	1909	1	–	–	–	–
34	Billy Flegg	Australia	Five-eighth	1909	2	–	–	–	–
35	Arthur Hennessy	Australia	Prop	1909	4	–	–	–	–
36	Gordon 'Babe' Hooker	New Zealand	Centre	1909	2	–	–	–	–
37	L. Brown	Australia	Prop	1909	1	–	–	–	–
38	Frank Foran	Australia	Centre	1909	1	–	–	–	–
39	Lance Abbott	Australia	Wing	1909	1	–	–	–	–
40	Fred Denholm	Australia	Second-row	1909	1	–	–	–	–
41	Henry Kaufmann	Australia	Five-eighth	1909–1910, 1914	9	–	–	–	–
42	Rudolph Lenton	Australia	Wing	1909	1	1	–	–	3
43	Barney Dalton	Australia	Five-eighth	1910–1912, 1914–1915	57	13	2	–	43
44	Charles Nash	Australia	Wing	1910	3	–	–	–	–
46	Lesley Wylie	Australia	Centre	1910	11	2	1	–	8
45	Bob 'Botsy' Williams	Australia	Prop	1910–1918, 1920	118	6	–	–	18
47	G. Payne	Australia	Wing	1910	3	1	–	–	3
48	Eddie Mandible	Australia	Five-eighth	1910	2	1	–	–	3
49	John 'Dinny' Campbell	Australia	Centre	1910–1912, 1921	33	18	–	1	56
50	Leslie Cody	Australia	Halfback	1910–1911	19	8	2	–	28
53	Eddie White	Australia	Wing	1910–1914	30	12	–	–	36
51	Fred Kinghorn	Australia	Fullback	1911–1914	47	–	–	3	6
52	Fred Strickland	Australia	Wing	1911	11	9	1	–	29
54	Charlie Lees	Australia	Prop	1911–1921	130	13	2	–	43
69	Claude Nicholson	Australia	Second-row	1911, 1913–1915	15	7	–	–	21
56	Harold Corbett	Australia	Halfback	1911–1912	6	–	–	–	–
57	Jack Cunningham	Australia	Prop	1911	2	1	–	–	3
58	William Dalton	Australia	Prop	1911–1912	14	–	–	–	–
59	George Mackay	Australia	Hooker	1911	3	–	–	–	–
60	Herbie Collins	Australia	Five-eighth	1911	4	–	–	–	–
61	Arthur 'Pony' Halloway	Australia	Halfback	1912–1914	36	9	–	–	27
62	Wally Messenger	Australia	Wing	1912–1920	98	50	237	–	624
63	Arthur Allen	Australia	Wing	1912	1	–	–	–	–
64	Dan Flannery	Australia	Fullback	1913–1915, 1917–1918	46	3	1	2	15
65	Bob Tidyman	Australia	Centre	1913–1915	36	7	–	–	21
66	Jack 'Bluey' Watkins	Australia	Lock	1913–1916, 1919–1924, 1926	112	23	–	–	69
67	Les Cubitt	Australia	Centre	1913–1922	93	53	2	1	165
68	Ernest Gowenlock	Australia	Wing	1913	2	–	–	–	–
71	Sylvester Redmond	Australia	Wing	1913	1	–	–	–	–
72	George Challis	Australia	Fullback	1914–1916, 1920	41	2	–	1	8
73	W. Watson	Australia	Wing	1914	2	–	–	–	–
74	William Allman	Australia	Second-row	1914–1915	9	4	–	–	12
75	Pierce Butler	Australia	Prop	1914	1	–	–	–	–
77	Hubert McNamara	Australia	Centre	1914	1	–	–	–	–
76	James Martin	Australia	Wing	1914	1	–	–	–	–
78	Arthur Davison	Australia	Halfback	1914	1	–	–	–	–
79	Jim Duffy	Australia	Second-row	1915–1920	77	16	–	–	48
80	George McGowan	Australia	Halfback	1915	10	1	3	–	9
81	Edward Coyne	Australia	Halfback	1915	4	–	–	–	–
82	Reginald McKellar	Australia	Five-eighth	1915–1919	30	2	–	–	6
836	Alex Barnetson	Australia	–	1915	1	–	–	–	–
83	Charles Barker	Australia	Wing	1915–1918	25	4	4	–	20
84	Bob Linklater	Australia	Second-row	1915–1919	52	–	–	–	–
85	Abraham Jonas	Australia	Wing	1915–1916	6	2	–	–	6
86	Harry Caples	Australia	Five-eighth	1916–1923, 1929	106	28	–	–	84
87	Herb Gilbert	Australia	Centre	1916	14	6	–	–	18
88	Tas Jones	Australia	Halfback	1916	1	–	–	–	–
89	Bill Raymond	Australia	Prop	1916–1917	4	1	–	–	3
90	Francis Male	Australia	Halfback	1916–1917	21	–	–	–	–
91	Max Doerner	Australia	Fullback	1917	4	–	–	–	–
92	Ray Norman	Australia	Centre	1917–1921	52	3	15	–	39
93	Tim O'Connor	Australia	Lock	1917	10	1	–	–	3
94	Roy Adams	Australia	Wing	1917, 1919	20	1	–	–	3
95	William Tijou	Australia	Lock	1917–1920	20	–	–	–	–
96	Gordon Wright	Australia	Wing	1917–1923	65	64	–	–	192
97	Henry Keane	Australia	Wing	1918	9	2	–	–	6
98	F. Moran	Australia	Hooker	1918	2	–	–	–	–
99	Rex Norman	Australia	Centre	1918, 1920–1922	46	8	46	–	116
101	Tom Glazebrook	Australia	Lock	1918	7	1	–	–	3
102	Albert Arrowsmith	Australia	Wing	1918	1	–	–	–	–
103	Sid Kaufman	Australia	Halfback	1918–1924	76	9	1	–	29
104	Robert Batchelor	Australia	Prop	1918–1919, 1921–1922	13	2	–	–	6
105	Herbert Bawden	Australia	Second-row	1919–1920	11	2	–	–	6
106	Reg Farnell	Australia	Prop	1919	13	2	–	–	6
107	Stan King	Australia	Lock	1919–1921	9	2	–	–	6
108	John Larkin	Australia	Centre	1919	1	1	–	–	3
109	Rupert Burton	Australia	Wing	1919	2	2	–	–	6
110	Edward Connerton	Australia	Centre	1919–1920, 1922–1923	19	1	–	–	3
111	Wally Freeman	Australia	Fullback	1919	5	–	–	–	–
112	Ernie Tate	Australia	Centre	1919	4	–	–	–	–
113	Bill Cameron	Australia	Second-row	1920–1921	21	5	–	–	15
114	Ed 'Snowy' Rigney	Australia	Fullback	1920–1924, 1926	63	–	1	–	2
115	Fred Hume	Australia	Centre	1920–1922	19	2	–	–	6
121	Arch J. Thompson	Australia	Hooker	1920, 1922	10	1	–	–	3
117	Les Arthur	Australia	Wing	1920	4	1	–	–	3
118	Tommy Burns	Australia	Wing	1920	3	1	–	–	3
119	Jim Crowell	Australia	Halfback	1920	2	–	4	–	8
122	E. Ward	Australia	Hooker	1920	1	–	–	–	–
120	Charles Steel	Australia	–	1920	1	1	–	–	3
116	Arch Thompson	Australia	Lock	1920	1	–	–	–	–
123	Harold Holmes	Australia	Hooker	1921–1924	47	15	–	–	45
124	Bill Ives	Australia	Prop	1921–1927	82	12	8	–	52
125	Fred Bartley	Australia	Prop	1922	2	–	–	–	–
126	George Clamback	Australia	Second-row	1922, 1927	28	6	–	–	18
127	Arthur Oxford	Australia	Second-row	1922–1924, 1926–1929	103	18	257	–	568
128	W. Ryan	Australia	Hooker	1922	2	–	–	–	–
129	Les Steel	Australia	Wing	1922–1929	107	50	2	–	154
130	Ray Lewis	Australia	Five-eighth	1922	8	1	–	–	3
131	Edward Little	Australia	Hooker	1922	8	1	–	–	3
132	Johnny Tandy	Australia	Wing	1922	2	–	–	–	–
133	George Boddington	Australia	Lock	1922–1928	61	10	–	–	30
134	William Livio	Australia	Wing	1922	1	–	–	–	–
135	Jack Dawson	Australia	Centre	1923–1924	23	9	–	–	27
136	Thomas Joseph Molloy	Australia	Prop	1923–1926	42	1	–	–	3
137	Bill Richards	Australia	Second-row	1923	14	1	–	–	3
140	Vernon Kennelly	Australia	Centre	1923	1	–	–	–	–
138	Cecil Abotomey	Australia	Wing	1923–1924	21	4	1	–	14
139	Frank Egan	Australia	Halfback	1923–1925	14	1	–	–	3
141	Tom Fitzpatrick	Australia	Second-row	1923–1930	73	19	–	–	57
142	Jack O'Donnell	Australia	Lock	1923	3	–	–	–	–
143	Robert Wittrien	Australia	Second-row	1923-1924	2	–	–	–	–
144	George Agar	Australia	Centre	1923–1924	15	2	–	–	6
145	Martin Cunningham	Australia	Five-eighth	1924–1925	6	–	–	–	–
146	Jim Tuckey	Australia	Second-row	1924	6	–	–	–	–
147	Clarrie Hincksman	Australia	Centre	1924–1925	16	4	3	–	18
148	Thomas John Molloy	Australia	Five-eighth	1924–1926	17	–	–	–	–
149	Leo Baggott	Australia	Centre	1924	2	–	–	–	–
150	Andy See	Australia	Wing	1924	1	–	–	–	–
151	Harry Finch	Australia	Wing	1925	9	1	–	–	3
152	Nelson Hardy	Australia	Centre	1925–1930	70	14	29	–	100
153	Harold King	Australia	Hooker	1925	11	2	–	–	6
154	Horace Moxon	Australia	Second-row	1925–1926	19	3	–	–	9
155	James Peoples	Australia	Five-eighth	1925	2	–	–	–	–
157	Hugh Byrne	Australia	Wing	1925–1928, 1930	56	27	2	–	85
156	Norm Christie	Australia	Prop	1925	6	–	–	–	–
158	J. Lawler	Australia	Hooker	1925	2	–	–	–	–
159	Robert Booth	Australia	Wing	1925	3	1	–	–	3
160	Harry Kavanagh	Australia	Second-row	1925–1929	35	15	–	–	45
161	Norman Fitzpatrick	Australia	Prop	1926	17	1	–	–	3
162	George Harris	Australia	Lock	1926–1929	49	7	–	–	21
163	George McGee	Australia	Five-eighth	1926-1927	8	–	–	–	–
164	Vince Oliveira	Australia	Halfback	1926	5	–	–	–	–
165	Arthur Toby	Australia	Fullback	1926–1929	54	5	–	–	15
166	Larry Hedger	Australia	Centre	1926–1929	44	14	1	–	44
167	Bill Phillips	Australia	Fullback	1926-1927	2	–	–	–	–
168	George Hall	Australia	Prop	1926–1927	9	2	–	–	6
169	Cyril Massey	Australia	Centre	1926–1927	3	1	–	–	3
170	Tom Barry	Australia	Centre	1927	5	3	–	–	9
171	Rick Bevan	Australia	Fullback	1927	1	–	–	–	–
172	Norm Pope	Australia	Halfback	1927–1931	57	16	1	–	50
173	Dick Brown	Australia	Hooker	1927–1929, 1931–1933	77	7	–	–	21
174	Arthur Robinson	Australia	Centre	1927, 1929–1930	12	1	–	–	3
175	John Barratt	Australia	Wing	1927, 1929	13	1	–	–	3
176	Paddy Burton	Australia	Second-row	1927	3	1	–	–	3
177	Vic Webber	Australia	Wing	1927–1929	10	3	–	–	9
178	Jack Coote	Australia	Prop	1927, 1929–1930, 1935–1937	41	14	–	–	42
179	Fletcher Jeffries	Australia	Wing	1927	2	–	–	–	–
180	Geoff Keys	Australia	Second-row	1927	2	–	–	–	–
181	Stanley Sharp	Australia	Halfback	1927, 1931	3	–	–	–	–
182	Alfred Carter	Australia	Prop	1927, 1929	6	1	–	–	3
183	Sammy Bryant	Australia	Hooker	1928, 1933	14	1	–	–	3
184	Joe 'Chimpy' Busch	Australia	Halfback	1928–1930	32	11	–	–	33
185	Gordon Fletcher	Australia	Five-eighth	1928–1930, 1932	39	5	–	–	15
186	Bill Dyer	Australia	Prop	1928–1929, 1931, 1933	16	1	–	–	3
187	Tom Trotter	Australia	Centre	1928	6	1	–	–	3
188	Bill Cole	Australia	Five-eighth	1928–1929	6	2	–	–	6
189	Bill Shankland	Australia	Wing	1929	9	10	2	–	34
190	Ray Stehr	Australia	Prop	1929–1942, 1945–1946	174	16	4	–	56
191	Gordon Torpy	Australia	Second-row	1929	16	1	–	–	3
192	Billy Hong	Australia	Fullback	1929–1932	46	1	–	–	3
193	Joe Pearce	Australia	Second-row	1929–1942	148	33	14	–	127
196	Morrie Boyle	Australia	Wing	1929–1932	33	30	3	–	96
194	Bernard Bakewell	Australia	Wing	1929	1	–	–	–	–
195	Fred Davies	Australia	Lock	1929	2	–	–	–	–
223	Harry Thompson	Australia	Wing	1929, 1933–1934	16	7	–	–	21
197	Jack Hickey	Australia	Second-row	1930	15	8	14	–	52
198	Jenkin Joseph	Australia	Second-row	1930	14	2	–	–	6
199	Jack Lynch	Australia	Centre	1930–1932, 1934–1936	57	39	111	3	345
200	Les Rogers	Australia	Lock	1930–1933	48	23	2	–	73
201	Fred Tottey	Australia	Wing	1930–1937	75	77	–	–	231
202	Dave Brown	Australia	Centre	1930–1936, 1939–1941	94	93	193	–	665
203	Perc Atkinson	Australia	Prop	1930–1933	40	–	–	–	–
204	Hilton Delaney	Australia	Wing	1931–1933	24	16	–	–	48
205	Max Nixon	Australia	Prop	1931–1938	103	20	–	–	60
206	Ernie Norman	Australia	Five-eighth	1931–1939	101	26	–	–	78
207	Roy Paillas	Australia	Centre	1931	3	–	3	–	6
208	Ray Gillam	Australia	Second-row	1931	2	2	–	–	6
209	Colin Smith	Australia	Centre	1931	2	1	–	–	3
210	Viv Thicknesse	Australia	Halfback	1932–1937	75	19	–	–	57
211	John Clarke	Australia	Prop	1932–1936, 1938, 1940–1942	70	4	–	–	12
212	George Shankland	Australia	Wing	1932	3	–	1	–	2
213	Jim Morrison	Australia	Second-row	1932–1933	5	2	–	–	6
214	Eugene Paillas	Australia	Five-eighth	1932–1936	6	1	2	–	7
215	Jack Gray-Spence	Australia	Wing	1932	1	–	–	–	–
216	Jack Guinery	Australia	Centre	1932–1933	5	–	–	–	–
217	W. Rayner	Australia	Prop	1932	1	–	–	–	–
218	Jack 'Buster' Craigie	Australia	Second-row	1933–1934, 1936	12	–	2	–	4
219	Jack Fay	Australia	Hooker	1933	1	–	–	–	–
220	Harleigh Hanrahan	Australia	Centre	1933	15	1	–	–	3
221	John Lane	Australia	Wing	1933–1934	22	10	–	–	30
222	Laurie Ward	Australia	Centre	1933	15	2	–	–	6
224	Tom Dowling	Australia	Fullback	1933–1937	67	1	60	–	123
225	Walter Anderton	Australia	Wing	1933	1	–	–	–	–
226	George Court	Australia	Second-row	1933	2	–	–	–	–
227	Fred Robinson	Australia	Halfback	1933–1934, 1936, 1938–1940	44	18	16	–	86
228	Bob Halloway	Australia	Halfback	1933	8	–	–	–	–
229	Bob Stuart	Australia	Prop	1933–1934	3	2	–	–	6
230	Eddie Wood	Australia	Lock	1933	7	1	–	–	3
231	Gordon Whitton	Australia	Second-row	1933, 1935–1936	10	1	–	–	3
232	Jack Beaton	Australia	Centre	1934–1938	38	18	62	–	178
233	Fred Buchanan	Australia	Wing	1934	9	2	–	–	6
234	Andy Norval	Australia	Lock	1934–1941	106	42	1	–	128
235	Harry Pierce	Australia	Second-row	1934–1944	137	59	–	–	177
236	R. Thompson	Australia	Prop	1934	1	–	–	–	–
237	Tom McLachlan	Australia	Hooker	1934–1937	51	4	1	–	14
238	Theo Lang	Australia	Hooker	1934	1	–	–	–	–
239	Ross McKinnon	Australia	Centre	1935–1938	23	9	11	–	49
240	Rod O'Loan	Australia	Wing	1935–1941	83	76	–	–	228
241	Gordon Favelle	Australia	Lock	1935	4	2	4	–	14
242	Len Trusler	Australia	Hooker	1935	3	–	–	–	–
243	Bill Halloway	Australia	Centre	1935	1	–	–	–	–
244	John Beckley	Australia	Hooker	1936	2	–	–	–	–
245	Albert Horsell	Australia	Fullback	1936, 1938	9	–	5	–	10
246	Henry McCallum	Australia	Lock	1936	2	–	–	–	–
247	Johnny Parker	Australia	Fullback	1936, 1942	11	2	1	–	8
248	Wal Bamford	Australia	Lock	1936, 1939–1941	6	1	–	–	3
249	Stan Callaghan	Australia	Centre	1937–1941	21	3	–	–	9
250	Jack Arnold	Australia	Prop	1938–1949	114	23	22	–	113
251	Lionel Pawley	Australia	Wing	1938–1939, 1941	23	10	8	–	46
252	Aden Cairns	Australia	Wing	1938–1939	15	8	–	–	24
253	Dick Dunn	Australia	Centre	1938–1947	134	31	157	–	407
254	Jack McCarthy	Australia	Lock	1938	10	3	–	–	9
255	Doug Bartlett	Australia	Fullback	1938–1942	39	–	49	–	98
256	Noel Hollingdale	Australia	Hooker	1938–1942	53	4	–	–	12
257	Jim Norton	Australia	Fullback	1938–1939	20	–	23	–	46
258	Laurie Pickup	Australia	Five-eighth	1938–1939	8	1	–	–	3
259	Percy Dermond	Australia	Wing	1938–1939, 1941–1943, 1946–1947	51	36	–	–	108
260	Frank Bell	Australia	Prop	1938	1	–	–	–	–
261	Larry O'Malley Jr	Australia	Prop	1939	4	1	–	–	3
262	Mick Rankine	England	Centre	1939	11	3	–	–	9
263	Les O'Donnell	Australia	Centre	1939, 1943	2	–	–	–	–
1220	Les Robinson	Australia	Halfback	1939	1	–	–	–	–
264	Mick Dalton	Australia	Hooker	1939, 1941	2	–	–	–	–
265	Harry Nobbs	Australia	Wing	1939–1940	9	5	–	–	15
266	Frank Vaughan	Australia	Centre	1939	2	1	1	–	5
267	Owen Campbell	Australia	Wing	1940	3	–	–	–	–
269	Kevin McLean	Australia	Centre	1940, 1942	10	7	–	–	21
268	Fred May	Australia	Five-eighth	1940–1941	31	4	1	–	14
271	Maurie Kilkeary	Australia	Wing	1940	1	–	–	–	–
272	Gerald Wenden	Australia	Wing	1940, 1942–1943	17	6	–	–	18
273	Sel Lisle	Australia	Halfback	1940–1942, 1944–1947	71	34	15	–	132
270	Bob Norval	Australia	Hooker	1940	1	–	–	–	–
274	Bill Brew	Australia	Centre	1940–1941	12	1	1	–	5
275	Don Gulliver	Australia	Second-row	1941–1944	53	3	–	–	9
276	Larry O'Shea	Australia	Prop	1941–1942	4	1	–	–	3
277	Brian Walsh	Australia	Wing	1941	5	3	–	–	9
278	Brian Bevan	Australia	Wing	1942, 1946	7	–	1	–	2
279	Doug Fry	Australia	Second-row	1942–1945	26	7	–	–	21
280	Wally O'Connell	Australia	Five-eighth	1942–1948	88	24	7	–	86
281	Tommy Kaine	Australia	Centre	1942–1944, 1946–1947, 1952–1953	44	20	1	–	62
282	Ray Brennan	Australia	Wing	1942	3	–	–	–	–
283	Cliff Tye	Australia	Hooker	1942	4	1	–	–	3
284	Len Portsmouth	Australia	Lock	1942–1944, 1946	29	2	–	–	6
285	Keith Coleman	Australia	Wing	1942	1	–	–	–	–
286	Harold O'Brien	Australia	Wing	1942–1944	9	1	–	–	3
287	Wal Allan	Australia	Hooker	1942–1943	2	–	–	–	–
288	Jack Blacker	Australia	Prop	1942	2	–	–	–	–
289	Tim Allen	Australia	Fullback	1943–1944	21	–	5	–	10
290	Ross Bassingthwaighte	Australia	Prop	1943–1944	15	–	–	–	–
291	Jack Coll	Australia	Halfback	1943–1944, 1948–1950	21	5	–	–	15
292	Bert Cowley	Australia	Halfback	1943	11	1	18	–	39
293	Don Sinclair	Australia	Hooker	1943, 1947–1948, 1952, 1954	55	4	–	–	12
294	Paul Tierney	Australia	Centre	1943–1949	73	33	–	–	99
295	Jack Dixon	Australia	Halfback	1943–1944	4	1	7	–	17
296	Jack Williams	Australia	Wing	1943–1944	6	6	–	–	18
297	Wally Rees	Australia	Prop	1943–1946	29	8	–	–	24
298	Tom Chilvers	Australia	Hooker	1943–1944	4	–	–	–	–
299	Kevin Gleeson	Australia	Lock	1943	2	–	–	–	–
300	Bert Rollason	Australia	Second-row	1943–1945	25	3	1	–	11
301	Doug Doney	Australia	Halfback	1944, 1946–1947	8	–	3	–	6
302	Michael Evans	Australia	Wing	1944	14	1	3	–	9
303	Harry Martin	Australia	Wing	1944–1945	12	5	–	–	15
304	Roy Street	Australia	Hooker	1944	3	–	–	–	–
305	George McCaffrey	Australia	Wing	1944	2	–	–	–	–
313	Keith Dallwitz	Australia	Centre	1944–1945	7	1	–	–	3
306	Arthur Oxford Jr	Australia	Hooker	1944, 1948–1950	28	–	–	–	–
307	Ernie Berrell	Australia	Wing	1944	1	–	–	–	–
308	Sid Hobson	Australia	Second-row	1944–1949	73	8	–	–	24
309	Rod Chapman	Australia	Fullback	1944–1945, 1947	19	–	2	–	4
310	Ernie Hawkins	Australia	Lock	1944, 1947–1949	20	3	–	–	9
311	Allan Schafer	Australia	Centre	1944	5	1	3	–	9
312	Laurie Rafferty	Australia	Centre	1944	1	–	–	–	–
314	Ross Nixon	Australia	Prop	1944	1	–	–	–	–
315	Lionel Cooper	Australia	Wing	1945–1946	27	14	–	–	42
316	Johnny Hunter	Australia	Centre	1945–1946	21	5	–	–	15
317	Johnny Smith	Australia	Wing	1945–1946	14	2	–	–	6
318	George Watt	Australia	Hooker	1945–1946	27	7	–	–	21
319	John Hurst	Australia	Wing	1945	2	2	–	–	6
320	Roy Dykes	Australia	Second-row	1945	2	–	–	–	–
321	Matt McCoy	Australia	Centre	1945	2	–	1	–	2
322	Ron O'Connell	Australia	Halfback	1945	2	–	–	–	–
323	Ray Pratt	Australia	Fullback	1945–1946	17	–	18	–	36
324	Ken Foster	Australia	Wing	1945	4	1	–	–	3
325	Bob Farrar	Australia	Second-row	1946	14	–	–	–	–
326	Alan Quinlivan	Australia	Wing	1946–1947	7	2	–	–	6
327	Lee Rose	Australia	Centre	1946–1948	28	18	–	–	54
328	Norm Rogers	Australia	Centre	1946–1949	46	11	–	–	33
329	Lloyd Russell	Australia	Hooker	1946–1947	6	–	–	–	–
330	Bob Searl	Australia	Second-row	1946–1947	7	–	–	–	–
331	Bill Bray	Australia	Prop	1947–1948	26	4	–	–	12
332	Jack Jakeman	Australia	Prop	1947	3	–	–	–	–
333	Brian Holmes	Australia	Second-row	1947–1950	57	4	–	–	12
334	Pat Quinn	Australia	Wing	1947–1948	18	8	–	–	24
335	Kevin Brady	Australia	Wing	1947	3	1	–	–	3
336	Vic Bulgin	Australia	Fullback	1947–1949	33	4	32	–	76
337	Kevin Abrahamsen	Australia	Wing	1947–1949	11	1	27	–	57
338	Gordon Hassett	Australia	Second-row	1947–1949	14	3	–	–	9
339	Milton Atkinson	Australia	Centre	1947–1949	15	3	–	–	9
340	Ted Levy	Australia	Second-row	1947–1948	17	6	–	–	18
341	Ted Robinson	Australia	Centre	1947–1949	24	10	–	–	30
342	Brian Paulin	Australia	Second-row	1947	1	–	–	–	–
343	Ken McCaffery	Australia	Halfback	1948–1950	49	12	9	–	54
344	Eric Chatham	Australia	Centre	1948	7	1	–	–	3
345	Vic Anderson	Australia	Wing	1948	2	–	–	–	–
346	Keith Clark	Australia	Second-row	1948	5	–	–	–	–
347	Alvie Gauci	Australia	Centre	1948	6	1	–	–	3
348	Bill Sullivan	Australia	Lock	1948, 1950–1951	11	–	–	–	–
349	Leonard Sharman	Australia	Five-eighth	1948	1	1	–	–	3
350	Joe Rutherford	Australia	Wing	1948	5	–	4	–	8
351	Laurie Johnson	Australia	Wing	1948	6	6	–	–	18
352	Darcy Russell	Australia	Fullback	1948–1951	46	3	136	–	281
353	Dick Healy	Australia	Prop	1949	5	–	–	–	–
354	Ken Hunter	Australia	Prop	1949, 1951–1954	56	4	1	–	14
355	Billy Morris	Australia	Centre	1949	6	1	–	–	3
356	Len Solomon	Australia	Lock	1949–1950	20	2	–	–	6
357	Jim Hunt	Australia	Five-eighth	1949–1951	19	–	–	–	–
358	Ron Stewart	Australia	Hooker	1959	10	–	–	–	–
359	Frank Burke	Australia	Lock	1949, 1951–1952	41	7	–	–	21
360	John 'Mick' Phelan	Australia	Wing	1949–1950	22	4	–	–	12
361	John Murphy	Australia	Wing	1949	2	–	–	–	–
362	Col Donohoe	Australia	Halfback	1949, 1951–1953	43	13	3	–	45
363	Strachan Robinson	Australia	Wing	1949	11	3	–	–	9
364	Ian Verrender	Australia	Second-row	1949	2	1	–	–	3
365	John Sellgren	Australia	Wing	1949–1950, 1955–1956	39	19	–	–	57
366	Reg Beath	Australia	Second-row	1949–1950, 1952	22	1	17	–	37
367	Bob Banks	Australia	Five-eighth	1950	18	5	–	–	15
368	Gene Barakat	Australia	Lock	1950	4	2	–	–	6
369	Bruce Edwards	Australia	Prop	1950, 1952, 1956	27	1	–	–	3
370	Wally McDonald	Australia	Wing	1950	16	7	–	–	21
371	Ken Sawyer	Australia	Wing	1950, 1952	27	2	–	–	6
372	Vince Soorley	Australia	Second-row	1950	16	–	–	–	–
373	Jack McPherson	Australia	Prop	1950–1951	23	2	–	–	6
374	Ferris Ashton	Australia	Second-row	1950–1956	84	20	–	–	60
375	Vince Gilligan	Australia	Centre	1950–1951	4	–	–	–	–
376	Alan Cook	Australia	Fullback	1950–1952	25	4	26	–	64
377	Dave Hodgson	Australia	Second-row	1950	2	–	–	–	–
378	Laurie Hand	Australia	Hooker	1950–1951	10	–	–	–	–
379	Don Dengate	Australia	Prop	1950–1951	10	–	–	–	–
380	Ray Armstrong	Australia	Hooker	1951–1954	29	–	–	–	–
381	Charlie Banks	Australia	Second-row	1951–1952	26	10	–	–	30
382	Darcy Henry	Australia	Five-eighth	1951–1952	22	14	–	–	42
383	Brian Horne	Australia	Centre	1951–1952	28	3	62	–	133
384	Jack Perrin	Australia	Second-row	1951	1	–	–	–	–
385	Bill Reinhold	Australia	Wing	1951–1953	31	16	1	–	50
386	Kevin Wallace	Australia	Centre	1951	3	–	–	–	–
387	Don White	Australia	Wing	1951–1953	34	8	–	–	24
388	Jim Campbell	Australia	Second-row	1951–1954	19	2	–	–	6
389	Vic Murphy	Australia	Halfback	1951	1	–	–	–	–
390	John Bell	Australia	Prop	1951–1955	52	13	–	–	39
391	George Brewis	Australia	Hooker	1951	1	–	–	–	–
392	Rae Lewis	Australia	Lock	1951	5	–	–	–	–
393	Ray Thomas	Australia	Centre	1951–1952, 1954–1955	52	16	5	–	58
394	Frank Reardon	Australia	Hooker	1951	3	–	–	–	–
395	Alf O'Brien	Australia	Halfback	1951	6	1	–	–	3
396	Danny Byrnes	Australia	Wing	1951–1956	35	13	–	–	39
397	Brian Watts	Australia	Wing	1951	2	1	–	–	3
398	Bill Dowsley	Australia	Prop	1951–1952, 1954	12	–	–	–	–
399	Ron Booth	Australia	Fullback	1952–1956	66	5	129	2	277
400	Len Haskins	Australia	Centre	1952	1	–	–	–	–
401	Edward Hancock	Australia	Halfback	1952	1	–	–	–	–
402	Paul Carroll	Australia	Five-eighth	1952	5	–	1	–	2
403	Ray Hyde	Australia	Second-row	1952–1955	38	6	–	–	18
404	Bill Hackett	Australia	Five-eighth	1952–1953	7	–	–	–	–
405	Alec Johnston	Australia	Halfback	1952	2	1	–	–	3
406	Billy Beaven	Australia	Wing	1952–1953	10	6	–	–	18
407	Barry Blundell	Australia	Lock	1952–1953, 1955–1956	33	2	–	–	6
408	John Perry	Australia	Halfback	1952–53	7	–	–	–	–
409	Morrie Kermond	Australia	Wing	1952–1953, 1955	27	10	–	–	30
410	Keith Aitken	Australia	Hooker	1952	2	–	–	–	–
411	Geoff Brown	Australia	Second-row	1953	1	–	–	–	–
412	Kevin Byrne	Australia	Second-row	1953–1954	7	–	–	–	–
413	Dick Rowe	Australia	Centre	1953–1954	15	3	–	–	9
414	Ron Taylor	Australia	Centre	1953–1954	14	3	29	–	67
415	Jack Troy	Australia	Wing	1953	4	1	–	–	3
416	Ken Van Heekeren	Australia	Five-eighth	1953–1954, 1957–1958	60	18	–	–	54
420	Kevin McDonald	Australia	Centre	1953–1954	11	1	–	–	3
417	Kevin Doyle	Australia	Wing	1953–1954	26	18	3	–	60
418	Jack Gibson	Australia	Second-row	1953–1961	123	26	–	–	78
419	Malcolm Spencer	Australia	Centre	1953	2	–	–	–	–
421	Paul Pyers	Australia	Halfback	1954	7	3	–	–	9
422	Allan Wilson	Australia	Prop	1954	7	1	–	–	3
423	Kevin Clarke	Australia	Second-row	1954–1955	11	2	–	–	6
424	Ray Maloney	Australia	Centre	1954	4	–	–	–	–
425	Charlie Cooksley	Australia	Halfback	1954	1	–	–	–	–
426	Ron Sudlow	Australia	Halfback	1954	12	–	–	–	–
427	Frank Lawrence	Australia	Centre	1954	11	5	2	–	19
428	Fred Smith	Australia	Wing	1954	2	–	–	–	–
429	Frank Murphy	Australia	Wing	1954	1	–	–	–	–
430	Terry Fearnley	Australia	Prop	1954–1955, 1957–1964	140	7	2	–	25
431	Ray Christopher	Australia	Lock	1954	5	–	–	–	–
434	Barry Russell	Australia	Fullback	1954	2	–	5	–	10
432	Hyman Lewis	Australia	Hooker	1954	4	–	–	–	–
433	Ray Chadwick	Australia	Fullback	1954, 1958	2	1	1	–	5
435	K. Small	Australia	Second-row	1954	1	–	–	–	–
436	Brian Allsop	Australia	Wing	1955–1959	77	59	36	1	251
437	Reg Curran	Australia	Halfback	1955–1956	25	–	–	–	–
442	George Kempshall	Australia	Prop	1955	2	1	–	–	3
438	Noel Pidding	Australia	Wing	1955–1956	23	9	65	–	157
439	Kevin Wilson	Australia	Prop	1955	16	1	–	–	3
440	Ellis Bridge	Australia	Wing	1955	2	–	–	–	–
441	Nev Hayes	Australia	Wing	1955	6	1	–	–	3
443	Maurie O'Brien	Australia	Hooker	1955–1956	6	–	–	–	–
444	Neville Gosson	Australia	Hooker	1955	15	1	–	–	3
445	Ron Kelk	Australia	Five-eighth	1955	11	1	–	–	3
446	Col Longhurst	Australia	Centre	1955	2	–	–	–	–
447	Johnny Bosler	Australia	Halfback	1955	2	–	–	–	–
448	Rupert Mudge	Australia	Second-row	1955–1958	47	3	–	–	9
449	Tony Paskins	Australia	Fullback	1955–1958	52	13	100	–	239
450	Don Spence	Australia	Wing	1955, 1958	7	2	–	–	6
451	Tom Clinch	Australia	Halfback	1955–56	2	–	–	–	–
452	Bob Dinnerville	Australia	Five-eighth	1956	1	–	–	–	–
453	Brian Grant	Australia	Centre	1956	7	1	–	–	3
454	Kevin Hansen	Australia	Prop	1956	17	1	–	–	3
455	Ian McCarthy	Australia	Hooker	1956–1957	15	–	–	–	–
456	Keith Power	Australia	Halfback	1956–1957	18	3	–	–	9
457	Alan Ridley	Australia	Lock	1956–1957	13	2	–	–	6
458	Bill Horder	Australia	Prop	1956	4	–	–	–	–
459	Graham Jones	Australia	Centre	1956–1957	30	4	–	–	12
460	Bruce Sullivan	Australia	Second-row	1956	14	–	–	–	–
461	Fred Graber	Australia	Wing	1956	1	–	–	–	–
463	Geoff Bratt	Australia	Five-eighth	1956	5	3	–	–	9
462	Dick See	Australia	Lock	1956–1963	92	2	–	–	6
464	Ron Weigold	Australia	Wing	1956	5	2	–	–	6
465	Les Thomas	Australia	Fullback	1956	3	–	–	–	–
466	Barry O'Connell	Australia	Centre	1956–1959	54	11	72	–	177
467	Bill Lewis	Australia	Halfback	1956	1	–	–	–	–
468	Ken Dawson	Australia	Prop	1956–1957, 1959	33	2	–	–	6
1221	Bob Thomas	Australia	Fullback	1956	3	–	–	–	–
469	Jim Collins	Australia	Wing	1956–1957	11	4	–	–	12
470	Terry Bourke	Australia	Centre	1957–1959	7	–	–	–	–
471	Bob Brenning	Australia	Prop	1957–1958	22	–	–	–	–
472	Ken McMorrow	Australia	Halfback	1957-58	8	1	–	–	3
473	Col Purcell	Australia	Hooker	1957	7	1	–	–	3
474	Paul Aquilina	Australia	Centre	1957	6	–	–	–	–
475	Bob McDonagh	Australia	Lock	1957–1961	58	7	–	–	21
476	Ken Ashcroft	Australia	Hooker	1957–1967	146	5	–	–	15
477	Bill Martin	Australia	Prop	1957	1	–	–	–	–
478	Billy McNamara	Australia	Five-eighth	1957–1962	50	5	–	–	15
479	Bob Heffernan	Australia	Second-row	1957–1964	80	17	–	–	51
480	Ray Millington	Australia	Fullback	1957–1959	18	1	–	–	3
481	Doug Cameron	Australia	Halfback	1958	17	–	–	–	–
482	Bill McCall	Australia	Second-row	1958	3	–	–	–	–
483	John Vesper	Australia	Wing	1958–1959	10	3	–	–	9
484	Johnny Ferguson	Australia	Five-eighth	1958, 1961	8	1	–	–	3
485	Ray Beaven	Australia	Wing	1958–1959	19	8	–	–	24
486	Don Burge	Australia	Five-eighth	1958	4	1	–	–	3
487	Darcy Tosh	Australia	Wing	1958–1959	6	4	–	–	12
488	Ken Hardy	Australia	Halfback	1959	5	–	–	–	–
489	Alan Lynch	Australia	Centre	1959-60	9	–	–	–	–
490	Cec Maloney	Australia	Prop	1959-60	3	1	–	–	3
491	Ron Potter	Australia	Prop	1959	14	1	–	–	3
492	Bob Sait	Australia	Lock	1959	3	–	–	–	–
493	Bruce Ranier	Australia	Halfback	1959–1963	73	5	–	–	15
494	Bob Landers	Australia	Wing	1959–1965	105	41	251	–	625
495	Bill Roney	Australia	Centre	1959–1962	47	15	–	–	45
496	Ralph Stewart	Australia	Hooker	1959	5	1	–	–	3
497	Don Davies	Australia	Wing	1959	1	–	–	–	–
498	Ted Willis	Australia	Halfback	1959	4	–	–	–	–
499	Ross Quirk	Australia	Second-row	1959	4	–	–	–	–
500	Barry Fletcher	Australia	Second-row	1959	1	1	–	–	3
501	Gordon Clifford	Australia	Fullback	1960	6	–	17	–	34
502	Billy Groves	Australia	Wing	1960	3	–	–	–	–
503	Les Hampson	Australia	Prop	1960	4	–	–	–	–
504	Brian Wright	Australia	Second-row	1960–1961	29	6	–	–	18
505	Bob Keyes	Australia	Centre	1960–1961	4	–	–	–	–
506	John Andrew	Australia	Fullback	1960–1962	38	11	–	–	33
507	Doug Ricketson	Australia	Centre	1960–1963	59	8	–	–	24
508	Boyce Beeton	Australia	Wing	1960–1963	47	26	1	–	80
509	Peter Gallagher	Australia	Centre	1960–1965	87	9	2	–	31
510	Don Hardy	Australia	Second-row	1960–1961	5	–	–	–	–
511	Neil Ryan	Australia	Wing	1960	1	–	–	–	–
512	Tony Favell	Australia	Lock	1961	1	1	–	–	3
513	Warren Crotty	Australia	Second-row	1961	1	–	–	–	–
514	Ron Hanson	Australia	Fullback	1961–1963	16	10	–	–	30
515	Don Fenton	Australia	Second-row	1961–62, 1964-65	32	1	–	–	3
516	Bob Kennedy	Australia	Second-row	1961, 1963	5	2	–	–	6
517	Gavin Crofton	Australia	Second-row	1961–1964, 1967	21	–	–	–	–
518	Ken Wells	Australia	Wing	1961	3	–	3	–	6
519	Brian Devine	Australia	Wing	1961–1962	5	–	–	–	–
520	Neville Charlton	Australia	Prop	1962–1963	19	1	–	–	3
521	Merv Cross	Australia	Second-row	1962	13	1	–	–	3
522	Terry Gallagher	Australia	Wing	1962–1966	28	3	–	–	9
523	Garry Williams	Australia	Wing	1962, 1964	9	1	8	–	19
524	Tony Stavrianos	Australia	Halfback	1962-64	12	1	3	–	9
525	Bill Russell	Australia	Fullback	1962–1963	3	–	–	–	–
526	John Bissett	Australia	Fullback	1962–1963, 1965–1966	40	2	–	–	6
527	Geoff Waldie	Australia	Prop	1962–1966	43	–	–	–	–
529	Ron Saddler	Australia	Centre	1963–1964, 1966–1971	118	22	13	–	92
530	Fred Strutt	Australia	Five-eighth	1963	15	–	–	–	–
528	Ray McDermott	Australia	Prop	1963	9	1	–	–	3
531	Cliff Boyd	Australia	Fullback	1963–1968, 1970–1972	70	6	–	–	18
532	Ian Bugden	Australia	Halfback	1963	11	1	–	–	3
533	Bill Brown	Australia	Five-eighth	1963	3	–	–	–	–
535	Terry Matthews	Australia	Prop	1963–1967	55	4	–	–	12
534	Barry Robinson	Australia	Lock	1963	3	–	–	–	–
536	Ken Stonestreet	Australia	Hooker	1963, 1965-66	21	–	–	–	–
537	Kevin Ashley	Australia	Second-row	1963–1969	105	5	49	25	163
538	Greg Davies	Australia	Wing	1963–1964	14	4	–	–	12
539	Mick Ogg	Australia	Prop	1963	1	–	–	–	–
540	Kevin Robinson	Australia	Centre	1963–1964	2	–	–	–	–
541	Peter Dickenson	Australia	Centre	1964–1965, 1967-68	34	3	–	–	9
542	Kevin Junee	Australia	Halfback	1964–1973, 1976	159	69	–	1	209
544	Dan McCaig	Australia	Wing	1964–1966	21	4	–	–	12
543	Jim Matthews	Australia	Five-eighth	1964–1968	72	9	49	4	133
545	Jeff Skene	Australia	Second-row	1964-65	14	–	–	–	–
546	Frank Drake	Australia	Fullback	1964–1965	20	1	–	–	3
547	Nat Silcock	England	Prop	1964	13	–	–	–	–
548	Ken McMullen	Australia	Halfback	1964–1967	22	1	–	5	13
549	Ross Byrne	Australia	Second-row	1964–1965	4	–	–	–	–
550	Gwyl Barnes	Australia	Five-eighth	1964–1968	43	2	32	–	70
551	Kevin Conroy	Australia	Prop	1964	1	–	–	–	–
552	Ken Flanagan	Australia	Prop	1964–1965	12	–	–	–	–
553	Paul Cross	Australia	Wing	1964–1965	18	9	–	–	27
554	Col Scott	Australia	Second-row	1964–1966, 1968	20	–	–	–	–
555	Bob Hensby	Australia	Centre	1965–1966	22	1	–	–	3
556	Ian Stewart	Australia	Wing	1965–1966	3	–	–	–	–
557	John Geraghty	Australia	Second-row	1965–1968	20	1	–	–	3
558	Jim Vaughan	Australia	Second-row	1965	11	–	–	–	–
559	Mike Phillips	England	Lock	1965	6	–	–	–	–
560	Gary Banning	Australia	Second-row	1966	2	–	–	–	–
561	Tom Higham	Australia	Prop	1966	16	–	–	–	–
562	Graham Mayhew	Australia	Second-row	1966–1969	37	4	–	–	12
563	Gil Morgan	Australia	Wing	1966, 1968	4	1	–	–	3
564	Ron Pheeney	Australia	Prop	1966–1967	15	–	–	–	–
565	Ron Gallagher	England	Halfback	1966	4	–	–	–	–
566	Les Hayes	Australia	Centre	1966–1971, 1973–1975	57	7	–	–	21
567	John Peard	Australia	Five-eighth	1966, 1968–1971, 1974–1975	99	16	28	10	124
568	Ron Snell	Australia	Halfback	1966	3	–	–	–	–
569	Sam Crotty	Australia	Hooker	1966	2	–	–	–	–
570	Barry 'Bunny' Reilly	Australia	Lock	1966–1971, 1973–1979	198	18	–	–	54
571	Geoff Chambers	Australia	Prop	1967–1969	38	1	–	–	3
572	Louis Neumann	South Africa	Second-row	1967–1971	74	3	–	–	9
573	Ken Owens	Australia	Hooker	1967–1969	46	3	–	1	11
577	Graeme Stevens	Australia	Wing	1967–1969	27	3	–	–	9
575	Gary Torrens	Australia	Wing	1967	4	–	–	–	–
574	Bruce 'Lapa' Stewart	Australia	Wing	1967-1968	26	10	–	–	30
576	Allan McKean	Australia	Fullback	1967–1973	120	18	422	3	903
578	Sid Walsh	Australia	Prop	1967–1968	24	–	–	–	–
579	Trevor Grady	Australia	Centre	1967	4	–	–	–	–
580	Gary Collins	Australia	Wing	1968–1969	8	1	–	–	3
581	Bill Schultz	New Zealand	Hooker	1968–1970	15	–	–	–	–
582	John Walker	Australia	Prop	1968–1971	43	2	–	–	6
583	Gary Plater	Australia	Wing	1968–1969	2	–	–	–	–
584	Alan Gill	Australia	Wing	1968–1969	17	5	–	–	15
585	John Quayle	Australia	Second-row	1968, 1970–1972	51	9	–	–	27
586	Johnny Mayes	Australia	Halfback	1968–1972, 1974–1977	110	55	–	2	169
587	Bill Mullins	Australia	Wing	1968–1978	190	104	–	–	312
588	Jim Hall	Australia	Prop	1969–1970	31	1	–	–	3
589	Peter Moscatt	Australia	Hooker	1969–1973, 1975	82	7	–	–	21
590	Terry Bawden	Australia	Fullback	1969	11	2	33	1	74
592	Tom Coleman	Australia	Fullback	1969	3	–	6	2	16
591	Bruce Ayshford	Australia	Five-eighth	1969, 1975	15	–	–	–	–
593	John Gray	Australia	–	1969	1	–	–	–	–
594	Harry Eden	Australia	Lock	1969–1970	12	3	–	–	9
595	John Brass	Australia	Centre	1969–1976	143	33	295	17	715
596	Graham Montgomery	Australia	Centre	1969	1	–	–	–	–
597	Glen Stewart	Australia	Wing	1969	6	1	–	–	3
598	Trevor Fanning	Australia	Prop	1969	2	–	–	–	–
599	Bert Zara	Australia	Second-row	1969, 1975	6	–	–	–	–
600	Alan Barry	Australia	Wing	1969	4	–	–	–	–
601	Bob Goodsell	Australia	–	1969	1	–	–	–	–
602	Ian Baker	Australia	Prop	1970–1974	47	4	–	–	12
603	Alan Cardy	Australia	Wing	1970	10	5	–	–	15
604	John Dykes	Australia	Second-row	1970, 1974	4	–	–	–	–
605	Kevin Goldspink	Australia	Prop	1970–1971	26	3	–	–	9
606	Jim Porter	Australia	Wing	1970–1974	87	35	–	–	105
607	Jim Morgan	Australia	Prop	1970–1972	52	7	–	–	21
608	Mark Harris	Australia	Centre	1970–1979	195	88	17	–	298
609	Chris Armstrong	Australia	Prop	1970	1	–	–	–	–
610	John Ballesty	Australia	Five-eighth	1970–1973	55	11	22	1	79
611	Laurie Freier	Australia	Second-row	1970–1974	53	10	–	–	30
612	Graham Gardiner	Australia	Second-row	1970–1971	5	–	–	–	–
613	Mick Plant	Australia	Hooker	1970	3	–	–	–	–
614	Michael Cleary	Australia	Wing	1971	13	5	–	–	15
615	Arthur Beetson	Australia	Prop	1971–1978	131	17	–	–	51
616	Harry Cameron	Australia	Centre	1971–1974	55	4	–	–	12
617	Kel Brown	Australia	Hooker	1971–1973	24	–	–	–	–
618	Don Colquhoun	Australia	Second-row	1971	5	–	–	–	–
620	Bob Kelly	Australia	Lock	1971	2	–	–	–	–
621	Sid Williams	Australia	–	1971	1	–	–	–	–
619	Warren Chatfield	Australia	Second-row	1971	4	1	–	–	3
622	Ken Jones	Australia	Prop	1971, 1973–1976	29	–	–	–	–
623	Mick Alchin	Australia	Wing	1972–1973	19	12	–	–	36
624	John Armstrong	Australia	Lock	1972–1973	36	5	–	–	15
625	Ron Coote	Australia	Lock	1972–1978	109	39	–	–	117
626	Peter Flanders	Australia	Wing	1972	20	8	8	–	40
627	Dick Thornett	Australia	Prop	1972	9	1	–	–	3
628	Greg Bandiera	Australia	Second-row	1972, 1974–1975	36	8	–	–	24
629	Graham Olling	Australia	Second-row	1972–1974	14	3	–	–	9
630	Phil Hawthorne	Australia	–	1972	1	–	–	–	–
631	Charlie Renilson	Scotland	–	1972	1	–	–	–	–
632	Kerry Collien	Australia	Wing	1973	3	–	–	–	–
633	Ian Mackay	Australia	Prop	1973–1976	38	4	–	–	12
634	Pat Kelly	Australia	Second-row	1973–1974	11	3	–	–	9
636	Russell Worth	Australia	Halfback	1973	2	–	–	–	–
635	Terry Stevens	Australia	Five-eighth	1973–1974	14	2	1	–	8
637	Kevin Stevens	Australia	Halfback	1973–1980	103	26	124	–	326
638	Ray Strudwick	Australia	Fullback	1973–74	9	3	–	–	9
639	Russell Fairfax	Australia	Fullback	1974–1980	115	37	34	2	181
640	Mick Souter	Australia	Prop	1974	5	–	–	–	–
641	Elwyn Walters	Australia	Hooker	1974–1976	61	5	–	–	15
642	Greg McCarthy	Australia	–	1974	2	–	–	–	–
643	Arthur Mountier	Australia	Hooker	1974, 1978–1979	45	3	–	–	9
644	Doug Lucas	Australia	–	1974	3	–	–	–	–
645	Eric Ferguson	Australia	Fullback	1974–1977	8	3	2	–	13
646	Bruce Pickett	Australia	Wing	1974–1977	46	14	–	–	42
647	Trevor Barnes	Australia	Halfback	1975–1977	22	3	–	–	9
650	Ian Schubert	Australia	Wing	1975–1980, 1982	149	47	3	–	147
648	Bob Farrugia	Australia	Halfback	1975–1977	6	1	14	–	31
649	Bill Markou	Australia	Lock	1975–1978	7	–	–	–	–
651	Dennis Tutty	Australia	Second-row	1975	10	1	–	–	3
654	Col 'Mick' Field	Australia	–	1975	1	–	–	–	–
652	Grant Hedger	Australia	Prop	1975–1978	38	1	–	–	3
653	Des O'Reilly	Australia	Second-row	1975–1982	126	17	–	–	51
655	Garry Hardaker	Australia	Prop	1975	2	–	–	–	–
656	Mark Cohen	Australia	Wing	1975	2	–	–	–	–
657	Kel Sherry	Australia	Wing	1975, 1977, 1980	7	–	–	–	–
658	Dennis Hughes	Australia	–	1975	1	–	–	–	–
659	Ray Cupic	Australia	–	1975	1	–	–	–	–
660	Greg Townsend	Australia	Fullback	1975–1978	11	2	1	–	8
661	Reg Clough	Australia	Centre	1975	1	–	–	–	–
662	John Rheinberger	Australia	Centre	1975	2	–	–	–	–
663	Royce Ayliffe	Australia	Prop	1976–1983	152	14	10	–	64
664	Peter Fitzgerald	Australia	Second-row	1976	11	2	–	–	6
665	Terry Keen	Australia	Halfback	1976	5	–	–	–	–
666	Michael Mosman	Australia	Prop	1976–1979	38	–	–	–	–
1222	Michael Windeatt	Australia	–	1976	1	–	–	–	–
667	Stuart Kelly	Australia	Five-eighth	1976	1	–	–	–	–
668	Robert Laurie	Australia	Five-eighth	1976–1977, 1981–1982	58	12	–	–	36
669	Garry Metcalfe	Australia	Prop	1976–1980	61	1	–	–	3
670	Mark Snuggs	Australia	Wing	1976	3	2	–	–	6
671	John Mackay	Australia	Second-row	1976, 1978–1979, 1983–1988	94	7	–	–	24
672	Greg White	Australia	Hooker	1976	2	–	–	–	–
673	Mal Connor	Australia	Hooker	1976–1977, 1979–1980	34	5	–	–	15
674	Kevin 'Horrie' Hastings	Australia	Halfback	1976–1987	234	50	56	17	286
675	Bob Fulton	Australia	Centre	1977–1979	50	18	16	2	88
676	Bob Jones	Australia	Hooker	1977	3	–	–	–	–
677	Peter Reed	Australia	–	1977	2	–	–	–	–
681	Bob Taber	Australia	–	1977–1978	2	–	–	–	–
678	David Grant	Australia	–	1977	1	–	–	–	–
679	Arthur Kitinas	Australia	–	1977	1	–	–	–	–
680	Terry Murphy	Australia	Wing	1977–1981	39	10	–	–	30
684	Alan Power	Australia	Centre	1978	19	2	–	–	6
682	Gavin Miller	Australia	Five-eighth	1978–1979, 1984	25	–	–	–	–
683	Bob O'Reilly	Australia	Prop	1978–1979	39	6	–	–	18
685	Joe Reaiche	Australia	Wing	1978–1979, 1983	22	4	41	–	94
686	Kevin Plummer	Australia	Five-eighth	1978–1979	4	1	–	–	3
687	John Tobin	Australia	Lock	1978, 1980–1987	125	16	–	–	57
688	Bill Healey	Australia	–	1978	2	–	–	–	–
689	Paul Jelfs	Australia	Lock	1978–1980	20	4	–	–	12
690	Kerry Boustead	Australia	Wing	1979–1982	81	32	–	–	96
691	John Harvey	Australia	Prop	1979–1982	61	6	–	–	18
692	Greg Owens	Australia	Wing	1979	5	–	–	–	–
693	Ken Wright	Australia	Five-eighth	1979–1981	22	6	36	–	90
694	Bob Sheens	Australia	Lock	1979, 1981	10	–	–	–	–
695	Kyle Connor	Australia	Wing	1979–1980, 1985	5	1	–	–	4
696	Shaun Hore	Australia	–	1979	1	–	–	–	–
697	Steve Gigg	Australia	–	1979	1	–	–	–	–
698	Marty Gurr	Australia	Fullback	1979–1983	87	34	–	1	120
699	Greg Feltis	Australia	Fullback	1979	5	1	–	–	3
700	Paul Karipis	Australia	–	1979–1980	2	–	–	–	–
703	Steve McFarlane	Australia	Wing	1979–1983	66	19	–	–	63
701	Tony Brightwell	Australia	–	1979	1	–	–	–	–
702	Bernie Gurr	Australia	Second-row	1979–1980, 1983	5	–	–	–	–
704	John Higgins	Australia	Wing	1979	3	–	3	–	6
705	Spiro Strattos	Australia	–	1979	1	–	–	–	–
706	Gary Warnecke	Australia	Five-eighth	1979–1982, 1984	58	11	–	–	33
707	Kel Judd	Australia	Prop	1979, 1983	8	–	–	–	–
708	Barry Andrews	Australia	Five-eighth	1980	11	3	32	–	73
709	John Berne	Australia	Centre	1980, 1985	24	2	–	–	7
710	Noel Cleal	Australia	Second-row	1980–1982	70	26	1	–	80
711	Steve Hage	Australia	Second-row	1980	1	–	–	–	–
712	Paul McCabe	Australia	Second-row	1980–1981	33	8	–	–	24
713	David Michael	Australia	Wing	1980–1985	55	8	–	–	29
714	John Lang	Australia	Hooker	1980	22	2	–	–	6
715	Greg Lane	Australia	–	1980	1	–	–	–	–
717	Steve Sydenham	Australia	Centre	1980	3	1	2	–	7
716	Robert Lane	Australia	–	1980	1	–	–	–	–
720	Terry Fahey	Australia	Wing	1981–1982	47	23	–	–	69
721	Ron Giteau	Australia	Centre	1981–1982	46	11	142	2	319
722	Jeff Masterman	Australia	Hooker	1981–1983, 1985	70	9	–	–	31
718	Ian Barkley	Australia	Second-row	1981–1983	58	19	–	–	66
719	Dave Brown	Australia	Prop	1981–1982, 1985–1986	60	2	–	–	6
723	Jeff Fisher	Australia	Centre	1981	3	–	–	–	–
724	Bruce Foye	Australia	Hooker	1981	4	–	–	–	–
725	Russel Gartner	Australia	Wing	1982–1983	31	6	–	–	21
726	Robert Thompson	Australia	Lock	1982	4	–	–	–	–
727	Ricky Walford	Australia	Wing	1982–1983	13	4	3	–	18
728	Robert Cowie	Australia	Prop	1982–1983	8	–	–	–	–
729	Kevin Webb	Australia	Hooker	1982	4	3	–	–	9
730	Steve Collins	Australia	Centre	1982–1983	4	–	–	–	–
732	Allen Geelan	Australia	Centre	1982	1	–	–	–	–
731	Warren McDonnell	Australia	–	1982	4	–	–	–	–
733	Rick Hannan	Australia	–	1982–1983	2	–	–	–	–
734	Les Cleal	Australia	Second-row	1982	14	4	–	–	12
735	Earnie Garland	Australia	Hooker	1982–1985	24	1	–	–	4
736	Grant Jones	Australia	Fullback	1982	2	–	–	–	–
737	Mike Eden	Australia	Five-eighth	1983–1984	39	17	139	2	348
738	Peter Grounds	Australia	Centre	1983–1984	20	4	–	–	16
739	Alan Neil	Australia	Halfback	1983–1984	21	6	–	1	25
741	Terry Regan	Australia	Second-row	1983–1984	34	1	–	–	4
742	Mick Ryan	Australia	Centre	1983	15	5	–	–	20
740	Seamus O'Connell	Australia	Prop	1983–1984	22	–	–	–	–
743	Tom Arber	Australia	Prop	1983–1984	29	–	–	–	–
744	Keith Farrelly	Australia	–	1983	1	–	–	–	–
745	Graeme Atkins	Australia	Wing	1983–1984	27	5	–	1	21
746	Ron Gibbs	Australia	Second-row	1983–1985	33	5	1	–	22
747	Ken Groves	Australia	Prop	1983	3	–	–	–	–
748	Matt Cruickshank	Australia	Second-row	1983–1984	4	–	–	–	–
749	Col Porter	Australia	–	1983	1	–	–	–	–
750	Wayne McPherson	Australia	Fullback	1983	3	2	–	–	8
751	Craig Farrugia	Australia	Hooker	1983	8	1	–	–	4
752	James Cutler	Australia	–	1983	4	–	–	–	–
753	Dale Garrett	Australia	Five-eighth	1983	5	1	–	–	4
754	Joe Fenech	Australia	–	1983	3	–	–	–	–
755	Harold Salmon	New Zealand	–	1983	2	–	–	–	–
756	Mick Fitzsimons	Australia	–	1983	1	–	–	–	–
1255	Bruce Longbottom	Australia	–	1983	1	–	–	–	–
757	Stuart Davis	Australia	Wing	1983	1	–	–	–	–
758	Darren Finlayson	Australia	Second-row	1983–1985	8	–	–	–	–
759	Mark Beaven	Australia	Centre	1984	17	3	–	–	12
760	Rowland Beckett	Australia	Hooker	1984	12	2	–	–	8
761	Paul Dunn	Australia	Prop	1984–1985, 1996	61	3	–	–	12
762	John Ferguson	Australia	Wing	1984–1985	32	16	–	–	64
763	Brett Gale	Australia	Centre	1984	4	–	–	–	–
764	Scott Gale	Australia	Halfback	1984	19	2	–	–	8
765	David Greene	Australia	Wing	1984–1985	24	4	15	–	46
766	Dane Sorensen	New Zealand	Prop	1984	13	–	–	–	–
767	Kurt Sorensen	New Zealand	Second-row	1984	10	2	–	–	8
768	Shane McKellar	Australia	Wing	1984–1985	20	8	2	–	36
770	Steve Stone	Australia	Hooker	1984	23	–	–	–	–
769	Robert Simpkins	Australia	Lock	1984–1987	50	7	–	–	28
771	Glenn Leggett	Australia	Centre	1984–1987	33	6	–	–	24
772	Tim Barnes	Australia	Fullback	1984	4	–	–	–	–
773	Kelvin Eirth	Australia	Halfback	1984	1	–	–	–	–
774	Steve Hardy	Australia	Second-row	1984–1991	101	7	–	–	28
776	Gary Wurth	Australia	Fullback	1984–1988	75	35	8	–	156
775	Mick Cupic	Australia	–	1984	1	–	–	–	–
777	Mark Wheeler	Australia	Second-row	1984, 1986–1989	17	–	–	–	–
789	Jim Harvey	Australia	Second-row	1984–1986	17	1	–	–	4
778	Scott Bennett	Australia	Wing	1984–1986	26	1	–	–	4
1223	Phil Dotti	Australia	–	1984	1	–	–	–	–
1224	Bibi Edgerton	Australia	–	1984	1	–	–	–	–
779	Dean Bell	New Zealand	Centre	1985–1986, 1988	41	8	–	–	32
780	Olsen Filipaina	New Zealand	Five-eighth	1985	9	–	21	–	42
781	Hugh McGahan	New Zealand	Lock	1985–1991	118	20	–	–	80
783	Wilfred Williams	Australia	Wing	1985	7	1	–	–	4
782	Laurie Spina	Australia	Halfback	1985–1989	99	19	–	–	76
784	Wayne Challis	Australia	Wing	1985–1989	51	26	–	–	104
785	Mark Horton	Australia	Five-eighth	1985–1986	12	–	–	–	–
787	Wayne Portlock	Australia	Fullback	1985–1990	45	11	22	3	91
788	Todd Riley	Australia	Fullback	1985–1986	19	2	33	2	76
786	Mike McLean	Australia	Second-row	1985–1990	55	5	–	–	20
790	Terry Matterson	Australia	Lock	1985–1987	10	–	1	–	2
791	Brad Tessmann	Australia	Prop	1985–1987	57	2	–	–	8
792	Col Dreier	Australia	Centre	1985	2	–	–	–	–
813	Brendan Hall	Australia	Five-eighth	1985–1995	159	30	44	–	208
793	Michael Alchin	Australia	Second-row	1985	3	–	–	–	–
794	Corey Adams	Australia	–	1985	4	–	–	–	–
795	Lindsay Johnston	Australia	Prop	1985	3	–	–	–	–
1225	David Cruickshank	Australia	–	1985	1	–	–	–	–
796	Richie Douglas	Australia	–	1985	1	–	–	–	–
1226	Mike Ford	England	–	1985	1	–	–	–	–
1227	Roy Robinson	Australia	–	1985	1	–	–	–	–
798	David French	Australia	Wing	1986–1989	39	9	–	–	36
800	George Katsogiannis	Australia	Centre	1986	5	1	–	–	4
801	Tony Melrose	Australia	Centre	1986–1989	74	11	71	13	199
802	David Trewhella	Australia	Hooker	1986–1991	82	7	–	–	28
797	Brian Battese	Australia	Second-row	1986–1987	23	1	–	–	4
799	Trevor Gillmeister	Australia	Second-row	1986–1990	97	9	–	–	36
803	Trevor Paterson	Australia	Second-row	1986–1991	69	10	–	–	40
804	Craig Salvatori	Australia	Prop	1986–1995	117	21	4	–	92
805	Luke Beasley	Australia	Centre	1986	2	–	–	–	–
806	Paul Matterson	Australia	–	1986	2	–	–	–	–
808	Ron Griffen	Australia	Wing	1986	5	1	–	–	4
807	Dean Bailey	Australia	–	1986	3	–	–	–	–
809	Gary Prohm	New Zealand	Centre	1986–1987	28	5	–	–	20
810	Brian Johnson	Australia	Fullback	1986	12	2	–	–	8
811	Carlos Parra	Australia	–	1986	2	–	–	–	–
812	Joe Thomas	Australia	Hooker	1986	2	–	–	–	–
814	Steve Keir	Australia	Wing	1986	2	–	–	–	–
815	Mark McDonnell	Australia	–	1986, 1988	5	–	–	–	–
816	John Richards	Australia	Second-row	1987–1989	5	–	–	–	–
818	Tony Rampling	Australia	Second-row	1987	9	1	–	–	4
817	Steve Morris	Australia	Wing	1987–1990	67	20	–	–	80
819	Paul Danes	Australia	Halfback	1987–1988	11	1	–	–	4
820	Peter Johnston	Australia	Prop	1987–1988	20	1	–	–	4
821	Kurt Sherlock	New Zealand	Centre	1987–1992	88	8	101	1	235
822	Ron Ryan	Australia	Halfback	1987	2	–	–	–	–
823	David Smith	Australia	Centre	1987–1991	74	19	120	1	317
824	Brad Tassell	Australia	Wing	1987–1989	10	1	–	–	4
825	Danny Shepherd	Australia	Prop	1987–1990	41	–	–	–	–
826	Joe Lydon	England	Wing	1987, 1989	22	8	14	–	60
827	Russell Bartlett	Australia	Prop	1987–1988	3	1	–	–	4
828	Gary Bridge	Australia	Five-eighth	1988–1990	18	5	1	–	22
829	Wayne Marshall	Australia	Hooker	1988, 1990–1994	58	12	–	–	48
831	Jason Williams	New Zealand	Wing	1988	8	1	–	–	4
830	Brett Papworth	Australia	Fullback	1988, 1990–1991	7	–	6	–	12
832	Darren Blythe	Australia	Fullback	1988	4	–	1	–	2
833	Bill Dart	Australia	Prop	1988–1990	14	1	–	–	4
835	John Elias	Australia	Second-row	1988–1989	16	1	–	–	4
834	Kevin Duckett	Australia	Fullback	1988	1	–	–	–	–
837	Dean Clark	New Zealand	Five-eighth	1988	7	1	–	–	4
838	Pat Jarvis	Australia	Prop	1988–1989	37	–	–	–	–
839	Adrian Sligar	Australia		1988	2	–	–	–	–
840	Rob McCluskey	Australia		1988	1	–	–	–	–
842	Rod Silva	Australia	Fullback	1988–1995	92	34	–	–	136
841	Dennis Beecraft	Australia	Second-row	1988, 1990–1993	32	4	–	–	16
843	Rodney Thomson	Australia	–	1988	1	–	–	–	–
844	Sandy Campbell	Australia	Wing	1989–1990	24	3	–	–	12
846	Paul Mares	Australia	Prop	1989	6	–	–	–	–
845	Michael Cook	Australia	Centre	1989–1991	16	2	–	–	8
847	Geoff Sharpe	Australia	–	1989	1	–	–	–	–
848	Mick Delroy	Australia	Fullback	1989–1990	8	–	–	–	–
849	Steve Georgallis	Australia	Halfback	1989–1992	38	5	–	–	20
850	Martin Offiah	England	Wing	1989, 1993	13	9	–	–	36
851	Paul Culnane	Australia	–	1989–1991	5	–	–	–	–
852	Paul James	Australia	–	1989–1990	5	–	–	–	–
853	Tim Dwyer	Australia	Fullback	1989–1990	14	4	10	–	36
854	Col Fraser	Australia	Lock	1989	3	–	–	–	–
855	Steve Deacon	Australia	Centre	1989–1993	40	7	6	–	40
856	Brett Gillard	Australia	Lock	1989–1993	39	2	–	–	8
857	Warren Crompton	Australia	–	1989	2	–	–	–	–
858	Anthony Totten	Australia	Wing	1989–1991	12	6	14	–	52
859	Brad Burke	Australia	Halfback	1990	7	–	–	–	–
860	Matt Burke	Australia	Centre	1990–1991	22	3	–	–	12
861	Paul Vautin	Australia	Lock	1990–1991	34	1	–	–	4
862	Jim Bell	Australia	Prop	1990	9	–	–	–	–
863	Martin Quinn	Australia	Prop	1990–1991	8	–	–	–	–
864	Adrian Bolton	Australia	Wing	1990	2	–	–	–	–
865	David Shepherd	Australia	Five-eighth	1990	4	–	–	–	–
866	Paul Busch	Australia	Fullback	1990–1991	8	1	3	–	10
871	Tim Russell	Australia	Second-row	1990–1993	43	2	–	–	8
867	Shane Seinor	Australia	–	1990	1	–	–	–	–
868	Brett Wheelhouse	Australia	–	1990	1	–	–	–	–
869	Jason Tassell	Australia	Second-row	1990–1994	48	2	–	–	8
870	Corey Stewart	Australia	Fullback	1990	4	1	–	–	4
872	Justin Dooley	Australia	Prop	1990–1991, 1998–1999	29	1	–	–	4
873	Grant Hyde	Australia	–	1990	1	–	–	–	–
874	Steve Benkic	Australia	Centre	1991–1992	16	4	2	–	20
875	Mark Protheroe	Australia	Wing	1991–1995	90	28	–	–	112
876	Colin Ward	Australia	Prop	1991–1994	33	4	–	–	16
878	Bruce Sinclair	Australia	Prop	1991–1994	50	1	–	–	4
877	Gavin Orr	Australia	Fullback	1991–1992	13	1	–	–	4
879	Terry Hill	Australia	Centre	1991	13	8	–	–	32
880	Jeff Orford	Australia	Wing	1991–1994	70	22	–	–	88
881	Ty Hardy	Australia	Prop	1991–1992	4	–	–	–	–
882	Steve Robinson	Australia	Five-eighth	1991–1992	16	–	–	–	–
883	Matt Donohoe	Australia	–	1991–1992	2	–	–	–	–
884	Luke Ricketson	Australia	Lock	1991–2005	301	40	1	–	162
885	Gary Freeman	New Zealand	Halfback	1992–1993	35	11	–	–	44
886	Nigel Gaffey	Australia	Lock	1992–1995, 1997–1998	110	29	1	–	118
887	Steve Hanson	Australia	Prop	1992–1993	22	2	–	–	8
888	James Mathews	Australia	Centre	1992	15	–	46	–	92
889	Wayne Sing	Australia	Second-row	1992–1994	14	–	–	–	–
890	David Seidenkamp	Australia	Fullback	1992–1994	30	11	–	–	44
891	Steve Funnell	Australia	Second-row	1992	1	1	2	–	8
893	Scott Murray	Australia	Five-eighth	1992–1995	30	3	–	–	12
892	Ross Harrington	Australia	Wing	1992	2	–	–	–	–
894	Rod Doyle	Australia	Lock	1992–1993	10	–	1	–	2
895	James Shepherd	Australia	Five-eighth	1992–1994	6	3	6	–	24
896	Jimmy Smith	Australia	Second-row	1992–1996	58	3	–	–	12
897	Tony Cosatto	Australia	Centre	1992–1993	18	1	–	1	5
898	Michael Appleby	Australia	Wing	1992–1994	17	3	–	–	12
899	Jason Lowrie	New Zealand	Prop	1993–1998	105	–	–	–	–
900	Craig O'Dwyer	Australia	Hooker	1993	14	1	–	–	4
901	Brett Docherty	Australia	Fullback	1993	1	–	–	–	–
902	Shane Walker	Australia	Prop	1993–1994	14	–	3	–	6
903	Jason Keough	Australia	Wing	1993–1994	23	2	–	–	8
904	Shane Whereat	Australia	Wing	1993–1996	35	12	–	–	48
905	Mark Barnes	Australia	Five-eighth	1993–1994	12	3	–	–	12
906	Grant Doorey	Australia	Prop	1993	1	–	–	–	–
907	Clinton O'Brien	Australia	Prop	1993–1995	23	–	–	–	–
908	Grant Wheelhouse	Australia	Wing	1993	5	7	–	–	14
909	Robbie Mears	Australia	Hooker	1993–1996	11	1	–	–	4
910	John Moses	Australia	–	1993	4	–	–	–	–
911	Harvey Howard	England	Prop	1993	4	–	–	–	–
912	Tim Blasczak	Australia	–	1993	1	–	–	–	–
913	Jason Hudson	Australia	Wing	1994–1995	37	7	5	–	38
914	Tony Iro	New Zealand	Second-row	1994–1996	60	11	–	–	44
915	Brian Smith	Australia	Halfback	1994	6	–	15	–	30
916	Craig Weston	Australia	Five-eighth	1994	8	–	15	–	30
917	Scott Sattler	Australia	Lock	1994	1	–	–	–	–
918	Kandy Tamer	Australia	Wing	1994	1	–	–	–	–
919	Richard Kairouz	Australia	Wing	1994	10	3	–	–	12
920	Adrian Lam	Papua New Guinea	Halfback	1994–2000	146	42	–	6	174
921	Sean Garlick	Australia	Hooker	1994–1997	64	3	–	–	12
922	Frank Napoli	Australia	Wing	1994, 1996	8	2	–	–	8
923	Richie Allan	Australia	Fullback	1994, 1996–1997	8	2	1	–	10
924	Adam Starr	Australia	Prop	1994–1995	7	–	–	–	–
925	Hamish Smith	Australia	–	1994	1	–	–	–	–
928	Graham Mackay	Australia	Wing	1995	13	7	20	–	68
929	David O'Donnell	Australia	Hooker	1995	7	–	–	–	–
930	Paul Smith	Australia	Centre	1995	6	–	–	–	–
931	Andrew Walker	Australia	Five-eighth	1995–1999	103	46	102	6	394
932	Nathan Wood	Australia	Halfback	1995–2000	78	17	–	–	68
926	Peter Clarke	Australia	Centre	1995–1997	52	27	–	–	108
927	Terry Hermansson	New Zealand	Prop	1995–1997	66	5	–	–	20
933	Darren Junee	Australia	Fullback	1995–1998	51	25	–	–	100
934	Adam MacDougall	Australia	Centre	1995	6	–	–	–	–
935	Danny Lima	Samoa	Prop	1995–1996	7	–	–	–	–
936	Brad Pike	Australia	Prop	1995	2	–	–	–	–
937	Barry Ward	Australia	Prop	1995	2	1	–	–	4
938	John Deery	Australia	Fullback	1995–1996	4	–	5	–	10
939	Henry Suluvale	Samoa	Wing	1995	1	–	–	–	–
940	Michael Salafia	Australia	Five-eighth	1995	3	–	–	–	–
941	Darren Maroon	Australia	Prop	1995–1996	2	–	–	–	–
942	Phil Clarke	England	Lock	1995–1996	12	2	–	–	8
943	Peter Jorgensen	Australia	Fullback	1995–1996	34	20	–	–	80
944	Nathan Blacklock	Australia	Wing	1995	5	1	–	–	4
945	Darren Rameka	New Zealand	Second-row	1995–1996	16	1	–	–	4
946	Ivan Cleary	Australia	Fullback	1996–1999	81	29	303	–	722
948	Brad Fittler	Australia	Five-eighth	1996–2004	217	91	9	8	390
950	Matt Sing	Australia	Wing	1996–2001	135	72	–	–	288
947	Ben Duckworth	Australia	Lock	1996–1997	11	2	–	–	8
949	John Simon	Australia	Halfback	1996	15	5	–	–	20
951	Tim Maddison	Australia	Prop	1996	18	–	–	–	–
952	Scott Logan	Australia	Prop	1996–2001	78	2	–	–	8
953	Dean Johnsen	New Zealand	–	1996	1	–	–	–	–
954	Michael Ostini	Australia	Prop	1996	2	–	–	–	–
955	Shane Rigon	Australia	Lock	1996–2000	84	18	–	–	72
956	Shane Millard	Australia	Hooker	1996	4	–	–	–	–
957	Julian Troy	Australia	Prop	1996–1997	17	–	–	–	–
958	Simon Bonetti	Australia	Hooker	1997–2002	142	2	–	–	8
959	Scott Gourley	Australia	Second-row	1997–1998	45	10	–	–	40
960	Robert Miles	Australia	Wing	1997–2000	66	27	1	–	110
962	Dale Shearer	Australia	Fullback	1997	11	2	–	–	8
963	Jacin Sinclair	Australia	Centre	1997	7	2	–	–	8
964	Peter Ellis	Australia	Second-row	1997–1999	3	–	–	–	–
965	Jack Elsegood	Australia	Wing	1997–2000	77	35	–	–	140
966	David Barnhill	Australia	Second-row	1997–1999	58	–	–	–	–
967	Damien Mostyn	Australia	Fullback	1997	2	–	–	–	–
968	Greg Bourke	Australia	Centre	1997	5	2	–	–	8
969	Adam Hayden	Australia	Five-eighth	1997–1998	8	2	–	–	8
961	Brandon Costin (né Pearson)	Australia	Centre	1997	10	6	3	–	30
970	Bryan Fletcher	Australia	Second-row	1997–2002	125	21	–	–	84
971	Dallas Hood	Australia	Prop	1997–2002	72	5	–	–	20
972	Chad Halliday	Australia	Fullback	1997	1	1	–	–	4
973	Richie Barnett	New Zealand	Wing	1998–2000	51	17	–	–	68
974	Julian Bailey	Australia	Centre	1998–2000	50	6	–	–	24
975	James Pickering	Australia	Prop	1998	14	–	–	–	–
976	Ryan Cross	Australia	Centre	1998–2006	143	85	4	–	348
977	Brendan Hurst	Australia	Second-row	1998–2000	21	1	–	–	4
978	Justin Brooker	Australia	Centre	1998	3	2	–	–	8
979	Peter Cusack	Australia	Prop	1998–2004	95	4	–	–	16
981	Quentin Pongia	New Zealand	Prop	1999–2001	43	3	–	–	12
980	Paul Langmack	Australia	Lock	1999	3	–	–	–	–
982	Craig Kimmorley	Australia	Five-eighth	1999	7	–	2	–	4
983	Shannon Hegarty	Australia	Centre	1999–2004	109	52	–	–	208
984	Darren Burns	Australia	Second-row	1999–2000	22	4	–	–	16
985	Paul Khoury	Australia	Halfback	1999	3	–	–	–	–
986	David Solomona	New Zealand	Second-row	1999–2000	21	3	–	–	12
987	Nelson Lomi	Tonga	Prop	1999–2000	5	–	–	–	–
988	Graham Appo	Australia	Wing	1999	3	–	5	–	10
989	Craig Fitzgibbon	Australia	Second-row	2000–2009	228	36	655	–	1454
990	Craig Wing	Australia	Hooker	2000–2007	185	66	–	–	264
991	Andrew Lomu	New Zealand	Prop	2000–2003	51	2	–	–	8
992	Luke Phillips	Australia	Fullback	2000–2002	65	19	34	3	147
993	Ian Rubin	Ukraine	Prop	2000–2001	39	2	–	–	8
994	Anthony Minichiello	Australia	Fullback	2000–2014	302	139	–	1	557
995	Chris Flannery	Australia	Second-row	2000–2006	126	38	–	–	152
996	Dean Widders	Australia	Lock	2000–2001	13	1	–	–	4
997	Albert Talipeau	New Zealand	Lock	2000–2002	9	–	–	–	–
998	Paul Green	Australia	Halfback	2001–2002	20	6	–	1	25
999	Adrian Morley	England	Prop	2001–2006	113	7	–	–	28
1000	Michael Crocker	Australia	Second-row	2001–2005	92	20	75	–	230
1001	Todd Byrne	Australia	Wing	2001–2004	61	30	–	–	120
1002	Monah Elahmad	Australia	Prop	2001	1	–	–	–	–
1003	Michael Korkidas	Australia	Prop	2001–2002	8	–	–	–	–
1004	Sam Obst	Australia	Hooker	2001–2002	7	–	–	–	–
1005	Jamie Russo	Australia	Five-eighth	2001	4	–	–	–	–
1006	Trent Clayton	Australia	Wing	2001	5	2	–	–	8
1007	Nathan Tutt	Australia	Second-row	2001	1	–	–	–	–
1008	Luke Milton	Australia	Wing	2001–2002	8	1	5	–	14
1009	Justin Hodges	Australia	Centre	2002–2004	58	26	–	–	104
1010	Brett Mullins	Australia	Fullback	2002	26	17	–	–	68
1011	Eric Grothe	Australia	Wing	2002–2003	11	2	–	–	8
1012	Mark Leafa	New Zealand	Second-row	2002	3	–	–	–	–
1014	Kylie Leuluai	New Zealand	Prop	2002	5	–	–	–	–
1015	Chad Robinson	Australia	Second-row	2002–2004	70	6	–	–	24
1013	George Azzi	Australia	–	2002	1	–	–	–	–
1016	Justin Holbrook	Australia	Halfback	2002	4	1	13	–	30
1017	David Kidwell	New Zealand	Second-row	2002	19	3	–	–	12
1018	Jason Cayless	New Zealand	Prop	2002–2005	83	4	–	–	16
1019	Mark Minichiello	Australia	Second-row	2002	1	–	–	–	–
1020	Wade Humphreys	Australia	Hooker	2002	2	–	–	–	–
1021	Brett Finch	Australia	Halfback	2003–2006	95	31	–	6	130
1022	Ian Henderson	England	Hooker	2003–2004, 2016	9	1	–	–	4
1023	Lelea Paea	Australia	Wing	2003–2004, 2006	15	1	–	–	4
1024	Todd Payten	Australia	Prop	2003	18	1	–	–	4
1025	Ned Catic	Australia	Second-row	2003–2005	44	4	–	–	16
1026	Tevita Metuisela	Australia	–	2003	2	–	–	–	–
1027	Stuart Webb	Australia	Hooker	2003–2005	48	6	–	–	24
1029	Steve Skinnon	New Zealand	Wing	2003	1	–	–	–	–
1028	Fred Petersen	Samoa	Wing	2003	2	–	–	–	–
1030	Henari Veratau	Papua New Guinea	Fullback	2003	2	–	–	–	–
1031	Chris Walker	Australia	Wing	2003–2005	47	26	44	–	192
1032	Todd Ollivier	Australia	–	2003	1	–	–	–	–
1033	Lopini Paea	Australia	Prop	2003, 2005–2010	95	3	–	–	12
1034	Ben Wellington	Australia	Centre	2003	3	1	–	–	4
1035	Anthony Tupou	Australia	Second-row	2004–2008	111	19	–	–	76
1038	Heath L'Estrange	Australia	Hooker	2004–2007, 2014	34	1	–	–	4
1036	Steven Crouch	Australia	Second-row	2004	1	–	–	–	–
1037	Gavin Lester	Australia	Wing	2004	10	3	–	–	12
1039	George Rose	Australia	Prop	2004–2005	6	–	–	–	–
1040	Sam Perrett	New Zealand	Wing	2004–2012	148	45	–	–	180
1041	Luke Dorn	Australia	Five-eighth	2004	1	–	–	–	–
1043	Brett Firman	Australia	Halfback	2005	4	1	–	–	4
1044	Joel Monaghan	Australia	Wing	2005, 2007	44	23	–	–	92
1046	Amos Roberts	Australia	Wing	2005–2008	89	54	42	–	300
1047	Iosia Soliola	New Zealand	Centre	2005–2009	92	22	–	–	88
1042	Richie Fa'aoso	Australia	Prop	2005	21	1	–	–	4
1045	Nigel Plum	Australia	Second-row	2005–2007	25	1	–	–	4
1048	Ben Hannant	Australia	Prop	2005	8	–	–	–	–
1049	Jamie Soward	Australia	Five-eighth	2005–2007	22	6	1	–	26
1050	Adam Schubert	Australia	Second-row	2005	5	1	–	–	4
1052	Mickey Paea	Australia	Prop	2005–2008	22	1	–	–	4
1051	Michael Lett	Australia	Wing	2005	3	–	–	–	–
1053	David Shillington	Australia	Prop	2005–2008	73	5	–	–	20
1054	Shane Shackleton	Australia	Prop	2005–2009	65	3	–	–	12
1055	Braith Anasta	Australia	Five-eighth	2006–2012	147	36	116	6	382
1056	Ashley Harrison	Australia	Lock	2006–2007	41	7	–	–	28
1057	Charles Tonga	Tonga	Prop	2006–2007	12	–	–	–	–
1059	Glenn Hall	Australia	Second-row	2006	2	–	–	–	–
1060	Vince Mellars	New Zealand	Centre	2006	12	3	–	–	12
1058	Mark Edmondson	England	Prop	2006	2	–	–	–	–
1061	Steve Meredith	Samoa	–	2006	1	–	–	–	–
1062	Lafi Manua	Australia	Second-row	2006	2	–	–	–	–
1063	Setaimata Sa	New Zealand	Centre	2006–2009	66	13	–	–	52
1064	John Doyle	Australia	Hooker	2006	10	1	–	–	4
1065	Shaun Foley	Australia	Fullback	2006	9	6	–	–	24
1066	Josh Lewis	Australia	Halfback	2006–2007	12	4	4	–	24
1067	Mitchell Aubusson	Australia	Second-row	2007–2020	306	68	–	–	272
1068	Chris Beattie	Australia	Prop	2007	6	–	–	–	–
1069	Shaun Kenny-Dowall	New Zealand	Centre	2007–2017	224	121	3	–	490
1071	Danny Nutley	Australia	Prop	2007	24	–	–	–	–
1070	Nate Myles	Australia	Prop	2007–2011	90	2	–	–	8
1072	Mitchell Pearce	Australia	Halfback	2007–2017	238	62	–	6	254
1073	Willie Brown	Samoa	–	2007	2	–	–	–	–
1074	Frank-Paul Nu'uausala	New Zealand	Lock	2007–2014, 2018	155	15	–	–	60
1075	John Williams	Australia	Wing	2007	12	5	–	–	20
1076	Danny Williams	Australia	–	2007	5	–	–	–	–
1078	Riley Brown	Australia	Hooker	2008–2009	27	–	–	–	–
1077	Brent Grose	Australia	Centre	2008	15	3	–	–	12
1079	Mark O'Meley	Australia	Prop	2008–2009	35	2	–	–	8
1081	James Aubusson	Australia	Hooker	2008–2010	42	2	–	–	8
1080	Willie Mason	Australia	Second-row	2008–2009	40	8	–	–	32
1082	Anthony Cherrington	New Zealand	Second-row	2008–2009	19	1	–	–	4
1083	Jake Friend	Australia	Hooker	2008–2021	264	27	–	1	109
1084	Sean Rudder	Australia	Five-eighth	2008	1	–	–	–	–
1085	Ben Jones	Australia	Centre	2008–2010	27	6	–	–	24
1086	Martin Kennedy	Australia	Prop	2009–2013	66	4	–	–	16
1087	Sonny Tuigamala	New Zealand	Wing	2009	4	–	–	–	–
1088	Sisa Waqa	Fiji	Wing	2009	7	2	–	–	8
1089	Rohan Ahern	Australia	–	2009	4	–	–	–	–
1090	Jordan Tansey	England	Fullback	2009	7	1	–	–	4
1091	Nick Kouparitisas	Australia	Second-row	2009–2010	31	2	–	–	8
1092	Tom Symonds	Australia	Second-row	2009–2012	27	5	–	–	20
1093	Stanley Waqa	Fiji	–	2009	9	–	–	–	–
1094	Ray Moujalli	Australia	–	2009	1	–	–	–	–
1095	Sandor Earl	Australia	Wing	2009	3	–	–	–	–
1096	Iwi Hauraki	New Zealand	Wing	2009	6	2	–	–	8
1097	Khalid Deeb	Australia	–	2009	1	–	–	–	–
1098	Todd Carney	Australia	Five-eighth	2010–2011	44	22	113	2	316
1099	Phil Graham	Australia	Centre	2010–2011	34	11	–	–	44
1102	Daniel Conn	Australia	Prop	2010–2011	28	1	–	–	4
1101	Aidan Guerra	Australia	Second-row	2010–2017	154	40	–	–	160
1100	Jason Ryles	Australia	Prop	2010–2011	46	2	–	–	8
1103	Brad Takairangi	New Zealand	Second-row	2010–2012	29	3	–	–	12
1104	Dan Fepuleai	Australia	Hooker	2010	1	–	–	–	–
1106	Sam Brunton	New Zealand	Hooker	2010	3	–	–	–	–
1105	Jared Waerea-Hargreaves	New Zealand	Prop	2010–2024	310	15	–	–	60
1107	Jason Baitieri	France	Lock	2010	1	–	–	–	–
1109	Joseph Leilua	Australia	Centre	2010–2012	59	20	–	–	80
1108	Mose Masoe	New Zealand	Prop	2010–2012	46	2	–	–	8
1110	Kane Linnett	Australia	Centre	2010–2011	23	4	–	–	16
1111	Jonathan Ford	Australia	Five-eighth	2010–2011	3	–	–	–	–
1112	Mark Riddell	Australia	Hooker	2011	11	–	–	–	–
1114	Justin Carney	Australia	Wing	2011–2012	17	3	–	–	12
1113	Tinirau Arona	New Zealand	Lock	2011–2013	36	3	–	–	12
1115	Lama Tasi	New Zealand	Prop	2011–2013	30	2	–	–	8
1116	Steve Naughton	Australia	Wing	2011	3	–	–	–	–
1117	Willie Mataka	Australia	Centre	2011	2	–	–	–	–
1118	Rhys Pritchard	Australia	Fullback	2011	2	–	–	–	–
1119	Boyd Cordner	Australia	Second-row	2011–2020	181	50	1	–	202
1120	Francis Vaiotu	New Zealand	Wing	2011	1	–	–	–	–
1121	Anthony Mitchell	Australia	Hooker	2011–2012	16	1	–	–	4
1122	Mark Kheirallah	Australia	Halfback	2011	1	–	–	–	–
1123	Daniel Mortimer	Australia	Five-eighth	2012–2014	43	8	7	–	46
1124	Peni Tagive	Australia	Wing	2012	5	–	–	–	–
1125	Jack Bosden	Australia	Second-row	2012	4	1	–	–	4
1126	Tautau Moga	Australia	Centre	2012	14	7	–	–	28
1127	Adam Henry	New Zealand	Wing	2012	4	1	–	–	4
1128	Nafe Seluini	New Zealand	Hooker	2012–2013	8	–	–	–	–
1129	Roger Tuivasa-Sheck	New Zealand	Fullback	2012–2015	84	28	–	–	112
1130	Daniel Tupou	Australia	Wing	2012–2026	307	198	–	–	792
1131	Michael Jennings	Australia	Centre	2013–2015, 2024	81	44	–	–	176
1132	James Maloney	Australia	Five-eighth	2013–2015	79	23	320	4	736
1133	Sam Moa	New Zealand	Prop	2013–2016	96	9	–	–	36
1134	Sonny Bill Williams	New Zealand	Second-row	2013–2014, 2020	50	11	–	–	44
1135	Luke O'Donnell	Australia	Second-row	2013	20	1	–	–	4
1136	Isaac Liu	New Zealand	Lock	2013–2021	203	15	–	–	60
1137	Michael Oldfield	Australia	Wing	2013	1	1	–	–	4
1138	Dylan Napa	Australia	Prop	2013–2018, 2023	124	2	–	–	8
1139	Samisoni Langi	Australia	Centre	2013–2014	3	–	–	–	–
1140	Kane Evans	Australia	Prop	2014–2017	74	3	–	–	12
1142	Nene Macdonald	Australia	Wing	2014–2015	11	3	–	–	12
1141	Rémi Casty	France	–	2014	11	2	–	–	8
1143	Willis Meehan	Australia	–	2014	1	–	–	–	–
1144	Brendan Elliot	Australia	Wing	2014–2016	14	9	–	–	36
1145	Jackson Hastings	Australia	Halfback	2014–2016	34	1	26	1	57
1146	Blake Ferguson	Australia	Wing	2015–2018	90	50	8	–	216
1147	Matt McIlwrick	New Zealand	Hooker	2015	8	–	–	–	–
1148	Siosiua Taukeiaho	New Zealand	Prop	2015–2022	168	13	63	–	178
1149	Willie Manu	Australia	–	2015	4	–	–	–	–
1150	Lagi Setu	New Zealand	–	2015	2	–	–	–	–
1151	Suaia Matagi	New Zealand	–	2015	7	–	–	–	–
1156	Joe Burgess	England	Wing	2016	4	2	–	–	8
1152	Dale Copley	Australia	Centre	2016, 2021	16	7	–	–	28
1153	Latrell Mitchell	Australia	Centre	2016–2019	96	65	209	1	679
1154	Jayden Nikorima	Australia	Five-eighth	2016	7	1	–	–	4
1155	Vincent Leuluai	Australia	–	2016	2	–	–	–	–
1157	Mitchell Frei	Australia	–	2016	7	–	–	–	–
1158	Eloni Vunakece	Australia	–	2016	9	–	–	–	–
1159	Abraham Papalii	New Zealand	–	2016	2	–	–	–	–
1160	Connor Watson	Australia	Hooker	2016–2017, 2022, 2024–2026	127	21	–	–	84
1161	Ryan Matterson	Australia	Second-row	2016–2018	60	10	–	–	40
1162	Joseph Manu	New Zealand	Centre	2016–2024	181	69	–	–	276
1163	Chris Smith	Australia	–	2016–2017	2	–	–	–	–
1164	Grant Garvey	Australia	–	2016	1	–	–	–	–
1165	Nat Butcher	Australia	Second-row	2016–	179	27	–	–	108
1166	Michael Gordon	Australia	Fullback	2017	22	7	72	–	172
1167	Luke Keary	Australia	Five-eighth	2017–2024	168	36	6	6	162
1168	Zane Tetevano	New Zealand	Prop	2017–2019	73	1	–	–	4
1169	Paul Carter	Australia	Hooker	2017	3	–	–	–	–
1170	Lindsay Collins	Australia	Prop	2017–	150	13	–	–	52
1171	Mitch Cornish	Australia	Five-eighth	2017–2018	5	–	–	–	–
1172	Victor Radley	Australia	Lock	2017–	181	28	–	–	112
1174	Cooper Cronk	Australia	Halfback	2018–2019	49	9	4	1	45
1173	James Tedesco	Australia	Fullback	2018–	207	111	5	–	454
1175	Reece Robinson	Australia	Wing	2018	4	1	–	–	4
1176	Kurt Baptiste	Australia	–	2018	9	–	–	–	–
1177	Matt Ikuvalu	Australia	Wing	2018–2021	38	25	–	–	100
1178	Sitili Tupouniua	New Zealand	Second-row	2018–2024	106	33	–	–	132
1180	Paul Momirovski	Australia	Centre	2018, 2022–2023	24	8	3	–	38
1179	Sean O'Sullivan	Australia	Halfback	2018	1	1	–	–	4
1181	Poasa Faamausili	New Zealand	–	2018–2020	24	1	–	–	4
1182	Brett Morris	Australia	Wing	2019–2021	39	30	–	–	120
1183	Angus Crichton	Australia	Second-row	2019–2026	159	41	–	–	164
1184	Lachlan Lam	Australia	Five-eighth	2019–2021	31	3	–	–	12
1186	Joshua Curran	Australia	–	2019	1	–	–	–	–
1185	Sam Verrills	Australia	Hooker	2019–2022, 2027–	48	7	–	–	28
1187	Ryan Hall	England	Wing	2019–2020	11	–	–	–	–
1188	Brock Lamb	Australia	Halfback	2019	1	–	–	–	–
1189	Drew Hutchison	Australia	Five-eighth	2019–2023	71	11	1	–	46
1190	Billy Smith	Australia	Centre	2019, 2021–2023, 2025–	63	29	1	–	118
1191	Kyle Flanagan	Australia	Halfback	2020	20	4	91	–	198
1192	Josh Morris	Australia	Centre	2020–2021	37	20	–	–	80
1193	Daniel Suluka-Fifita	Australia	–	2020–2022	20	–	–	–	–
1194	Max Bailey	Australia	–	2020	1	–	–	–	–
1195	Christian Tuipulotu	New Zealand	Wing	2020	1	1	–	–	4
1196	Freddy Lussick	Australia	Hooker	2020–2021	9	1	–	–	4
1197	Adam Keighran	Australia	Centre	2021–2022	17	4	35	–	86
1198	Fletcher Baker	Australia	Prop	2021–2023	46	3	–	–	12
1199	Sam Walker	Australia	Halfback	2021–	109	36	343	8	838
1200	Ben Marschke	Australia	Hooker	2021	13	1	–	–	4
1201	Tuku Hau Tapuha	Australia	–	2021	3	–	–	–	–
1202	Joseph-Aukuso Sua'ali'i	Australia	Centre	2021–2024	66	29	75	–	266
1203	Egan Butcher	Australia	Second-row	2021–	90	9	–	–	36
1204	Ben Thomas	Australia	–	2021–2023	7	–	–	–	–
1205	Naufahu Whyte	New Zealand	Prop	2021, 2023–	84	4	–	–	16
1206	Brad Abbey	New Zealand	Wing	2021	1	–	–	–	–
1207	Moala Graham-Taufa	New Zealand	–	2021	1	–	–	–	–
1208	Kevin Naiqama	Australia	Wing	2022	7	2	–	–	8
1209	Terrell May	Australia	Prop	2022–2024	53	7	–	–	28
1210	Matthew Lodge	Australia	Prop	2022–2023	18	2	–	–	8
1211	Oliver Gildart	England	–	2022	2	–	–	–	–
1212	Jaxson Paulo	Australia	Wing	2023	12	6	–	–	24
1213	Brandon Smith	New Zealand	Hooker	2023–2024	41	5	–	–	20
1214	Jake Turpin	Australia	Hooker	2023	15	–	–	–	–
1215	Corey Allan	Australia	Centre	2023	13	2	–	–	8
1216	Nathan Brown	Australia	Lock	2023	10	–	–	–	–
1217	Junior Pauga	New Zealand	Wing	2023–2024, 2026	22	10	–	–	40
1218	Sandon Smith	Australia	Five-eighth	2023–2025	47	6	64	–	152
1219	Siua Wong	New Zealand	Second-row	2023–	67	10	–	–	40
1228	Spencer Leniu	Australia	Prop	2024–2026	60	2	–	–	8
1229	Dominic Young	England	Wing	2024–2025	31	26	–	–	104
1230	Zach Dockar-Clay	New Zealand	Hooker	2024–2025	22	1	–	–	4
1231	Blake Steep	Australia	Lock	2024–	28	2	–	–	8
1232	Ethan King	Australia	Centre	2024–2025	3	–	–	–	–
1233	Mark Nawaqanitawase	Australia	Wing	2024–2026	47	47	–	–	188
1234	De La Salle Va'a	Australia	–	2024–	3	–	–	–	–
1235	Robert Toia	Australia	Centre	2025–	46	22	–	–	88
1236	Chad Townsend	Australia	Halfback	2025	6	–	–	–	–
1237	Salesi Foketi	New Zealand	Second-row	2025–	45	4	–	–	16
1238	Taylor Losalu	Australia	Prop	2025–	8	–	–	–	–
1239	Makahesi Makatoa	New Zealand	Prop	2025	5	–	–	–	–
1240	Hugo Savala	Australia	Centre	2025–	43	12	22	–	92
1241	Benaiah Ioelu	New Zealand	Hooker	2025–	17	–	–	–	–
1242	Xavier Va'a	Australia	–	2025	1	1	–	–	4
1243	Tom Rodwell	Australia	Wing	2025–	2	–	–	–	–
1244	Max McCathie	Australia	–	2025–	1	–	–	–	–
1245	Junior Tupou	New Zealand	Wing	2025–2026	2	–	–	–	–
1246	Daly Cherry-Evans	Australia	Five-eighth	2026	27	7	2	3	35
1247	Reece Robson	Australia	Hooker	2026–	23	3	–	–	12
1248	Cody Ramsey	Australia	Fullback	2026–	12	2	2	–	12
1249	Rex Bassingthwaighte	Australia	Wing	2026–	3	3	–	–	12
1250	Reece Foley	Australia	Five-eighth	2026–	2	–	–	–	–
1251	Tommy Talau	Australia	Wing	2026–	5	1	–	–	4
1252	Toby Rodwell	Australia	Halfback	2026–	2	1	2	–	8
1253	Hayden Barton	Australia	–	2026–	1	–	–	–	–
1254	Aston Warwick	Australia	–	2026–	1	–	–	–	–

=== Women's ===
Cap	Name	Nationality	Position	Seasons	Games	Tries	Goals	FG	Points
1	Botille Vette-Welsh	Australia	Fullback	2018, 2020	3	–	–	–	–
2	Karina Brown	Australia	Wing	2018–2019	7	–	–	–	–
3	Shontelle Stowers	Australia	Centre	2018–2019	6	–	–	–	–
4	Isabelle Kelly	Australia	Centre	2018–2019, 2021–	66	30	–	–	120
5	Taleena Simon	Australia	Wing	2018, 2020	5	5	–	–	20
6	Lavina O'Mealey	Australia	Five-eighth	2018	4	1	–	–	4
7	Maddie Studdon	Australia	Halfback	2018	2	–	–	–	–
8	Simaima Taufa	Australia	Lock	2018–2020	10	2	–	–	8
9	Kylie Hilder	Australia	Hooker	2018	4	–	–	–	–
10	Elianna Walton	Australia	Prop	2018	4	–	–	–	–
11	Tazmin Rapana	Australia	Second-row	2018	4	1	–	–	4
12	Vanessa Foliaki	Australia	Second-row	2018–2020	11	–	–	–	–
13	Zahara Temara	Australia	Five-eighth	2018–2022	24	2	43	1	95
14	Nita Maynard	New Zealand	Hooker	2018–2020	11	1	–	–	4
15	Sarah Togatuki	Australia	Prop	2018, 2020–2022	19	4	–	–	16
16	Chloe Caldwell	Australia	–	2018	2	–	–	–	–
17	Victoria Latu	Australia	–	2018	4	1	–	–	4
18	Sharon McGrady	Australia	Wing	2018	1	–	–	–	–
19	Ruan Sims	Australia	Prop	2018–2019	6	1	–	–	4
20	Brydie Parker	Australia	Wing	2018, 2020–2021, 2023–	54	28	–	–	112
21	Kandy Kennedy	Australia	–	2018	2	–	–	–	–
22	Corban Baxter	Australia	Fullback	2019–2021, 2023, 2025–	44	13	–	–	52
23	Kiana Takairangi	New Zealand	Wing	2019	2	–	–	–	–
24	Kirra Dibb	Australia	Five-eighth	2019	3	–	4	–	8
25	Melanie Howard	Australia	Halfback	2019–2020	4	2	–	–	8
26	Tallisha Harden	Australia	Second-row	2019	3	–	–	–	–
27	Hannah Southwell	Australia	Lock	2019–2021	13	–	3	–	6
28	Rebecca Young	Australia	–	2019	2	–	–	–	–
29	Aliti Namoce	Fiji	Prop	2019	3	–	–	–	–
30	Caitlan Johnston-Green	Australia	–	2019	3	–	–	–	–
31	Simone Smith	Australia	Halfback	2019	1	–	–	–	–
32	Bobbi Law	Australia	Centre	2019–2020	2	2	–	–	8
33	Shanice Parker	Australia	Wing	2019–2020	5	–	–	–	–
34	Quincy Dodd	Australia	–	2019–2020	5	3	–	–	12
35	Jasmin Allende	Australia	–	2019	1	–	–	–	–
36	Yasmin Meakes	Australia	Second-row	2020–2021	11	3	–	–	12
37	Charlotte Caslick	Australia	Fullback	2020	2	–	–	–	–
38	Filomina Hanisi	Australia	Prop	2020	4	–	–	–	–
39	Kaitlyn Phillips	Australia	–	2020	2	–	–	–	–
40	Kennedy Cherrington	Australia	Lock	2020	4	–	–	–	–
41	Jocelyn Kelleher	Australia	Five-eighth	2020–	64	8	169	1	371
42	Grace Hamilton	Australia	Prop	2020, 2023	10	–	–	–	–
43	Amelia Huakau	New Zealand	–	2020	1	–	–	–	–
44	Leianne Tufuga	New Zealand	Wing	2021–2022	12	4	–	–	16
45	Jessica Sergis	Australia	Centre	2021–	49	40	–	–	160
46	Taylor-Adeline Mapusua	Australia	Wing	2021	2	–	–	–	–
47	Olivia Higgins	Australia	Hooker	2021	7	1	–	–	4
48	Tayla Predebon	Australia	Prop	2021	7	–	–	–	–
49	Olivia Kernick	Australia	Second-row	2021–	60	24	–	–	96
50	Shawden Burton	Australia	–	2021–2023, 2025–	25	–	–	–	–
51	Keilee Joseph	Australia	Lock	2021–2023	22	3	–	–	12
52	Raecene McGregor	New Zealand	Halfback	2021–2022	12	–	–	–	–
53	Simone Karpani	Australia	–	2021	6	–	–	–	–
54	Mya Hill-Moana	New Zealand	Prop	2021–2024	25	1	–	–	4
55	Samantha Economos	Australia	–	2021–2022, 2024	10	–	–	–	–
56	Joeli Morris	Australia	Hooker	2021–2023	7	1	–	–	4
57	Samantha Bremner	Australia	Fullback	2022, 2024	15	8	–	–	32
58	Jayme Fressard	Australia	Wing	2022–	40	35	–	–	140
59	Destiny Brill	Australia	Hooker	2022	6	3	–	–	12
60	Shaniah Power	Australia	Second-row	2022	5	3	–	–	12
61	Pani Hopoate	Australia	Prop	2022–2024	24	2	–	–	8
62	Otesa Pule	Australia	Prop	2022–	53	11	–	–	44
63	Jasmin Strange	Australia	Second-row	2022, 2024–	38	7	–	–	28
64	Chante Temara	Australia	–	2022	1	–	–	–	–
65	Jada Taylor	Australia	Fullback	2022–	1	1	–	–	4
66	Shannon Rose	Australia	Wing	2022	1	–	–	–	–
67	Angelina Teakaraanga Katoa	New Zealand	–	2022	1	–	–	–	–
68	Tarryn Aiken	Australia	Halfback	2023–	37	18	6	1	85
69	Millie Elliott	Australia	Prop	2023–2024, 2026–	31	5	–	–	20
70	Keeley Nizza	Australia	Hooker	2023–	46	11	–	–	44
71	Amber Hall	New Zealand	Second-row	2023–	31	12	–	–	48
72	Lexi Kiriwi	New Zealand	–	2023	2	–	–	–	–
73	Teuila Fotu-Moala	New Zealand	Prop	2023	8	–	–	–	–
74	Amelia Pasikala	New Zealand	Second-row	2023	7	2	–	–	8
75	Mia Wood	Australia	Wing	2023–	31	16	–	–	64
76	Lily Rogan	Australia	–	2023	1	–	–	–	–
77	Tyler Bentley	New Zealand	Wing	2023	1	–	–	–	–
78	Millicent Scutt	Australia	–	2023	1	–	–	–	–
79	Taina Naividi	Australia	Wing	2024–	26	16	–	–	64
80	Aliyah Nasio	Australia	Second-row	2024–	26	4	–	–	16
81	Eliza Lopamaua	Australia	Second-row	2024–	15	2	–	–	8
82	Tiana Davison	New Zealand	Lock	2024	8	1	–	–	4
83	Tavarna Papalii	Australia	–	2024	8	–	–	–	–
84	Rima Butler	Australia	Prop	2025–2026	25	6	–	–	24
85	Macie Carlile	Australia	–	2025–	15	2	–	–	8
86	Taneisha Gray	Australia	–	2025–	4	1	–	–	4
87	Logan Fletcher	Australia	Wing	2025	1	1	–	–	4
88	Sariah Paki	Australia	Second-row	2026–	13	6	–	–	24
89	Keighley Simpson	New Zealand	–	2026–	1	–	–	–	–
