= Hedger (surname) =

Hedger is a surname. Notable people with the surname include:

- Charles Hedger (born 1980), English guitarist
- Grant Hedger, Australian rugby league player
- Jennifer Hedger (born 1975), Canadian television personality
- Larry Hedger, Australian rugby league footballer
- Luke Hedger (born 1995), British motorcycle racer
