= Norval =

Norval may refer to:

== People ==
=== Given name ===
- Norval Baptie, Canadian speed and figure skater
- Norval Campbell, Australian cricketer
- Norval Dooley, Australian Army officer and leading solicitor
- Norv Fernum, a ring name used by Peter Avalon
- Norval Geldenhuys, South African minister and Bible commentator
- Norval Helme, English businessman and politician
- Norval Horner, Canadian politician
- Norval MacGregor, American producer, director, and actor
- Norval Marley, father of Bob Marley
- Norval Mitchell
- Norval Morris, New Zealand-born law professor and criminologist in the United States
- Norval Morrisseau, Indigenous Canadian artist
- Norval Olsen, Canadian ice hockey player
- Norv Turner (born 1952), American football coach
- Norval E. Welch (c. 1835–1864), American colonel during the American Civil War
- Norval White, American architect, architectural historian and professor
- Edward Norval Blankenheim, American civil rights activist
- Jack Norval James, American rocket engineer
- James Charles Norval Waugh, South African politician
- R. Norval Garrett, American college football coach
- Samuel Norval Horner, Canadian farmer and politician

=== Surname ===
- Aletta Norval, South African-born political theorist
- Andy Norval, Australian rugby league footballer
- Bob Norval, Australian rugby league footballer
- James Norval (businessman), British businessman
- Malcolm Norval, Scottish rugby union player
- Piet Norval, South African tennis player
- T. L. Norval (1847–1942), justice of the Nebraska Supreme Court

== Other ==
- Norval, Ontario, Canada
- A trade name for the psychoactive drug Mianserin
- The main character in the 1756 play Douglas by John Home
