= Edward Coyne =

Edward Coyne may refer to:

- Edward Coyne (rugby league), Australian rugby league player
- Edward Coyne (priest) (1896–1958), Jesuit priest, economist and sociologist
