= Paul Busch =

Paul Busch may refer to:

- Pablo Busch (1867–1950), German-born explorer, physician, and politician
- Paul Busch (physicist) (1955–2018), German-born physicist
- Paul Busch (rugby league), Australian footballer
