= Stavrianos =

Stavrianos may refer to:

- L. S. Stavrianos (1913 - 2004), Greek-Canadian historian
- Tony Stavrianos, Australia rugby league footballer
- Stavrianos Vistiaris (16th-17th century), Greek poet
