= Wally Freeman =

Wally Freeman is the name of

- Wally Freeman (athlete) (1893–1997), British long-distance runner
- Wally Freeman (rugby league), Australian rugby league player
