= Bruce Ayshford =

Australian rugby league footballer

Personal information
- Born: 16 April 1948 (age 78) Australia

Playing information
Club
Years	Team	Pld	T	G	FG	P
1969–75	Eastern Suburbs Roosters	15	0	0	0	0
- Relatives: Blake Ayshford (nephew)

Bruce Ayshford is an Australian former professional rugby league footballer who played professionally Eastern Suburbs Roosters. Ayshford played in the NSWRFL premiership, where he was Rooster number #591.

Bruce Ayshford is the uncle of the rugby league footballer; Blake Ayshford.
