= Blake Ayshford =

Australian rugby league footballer

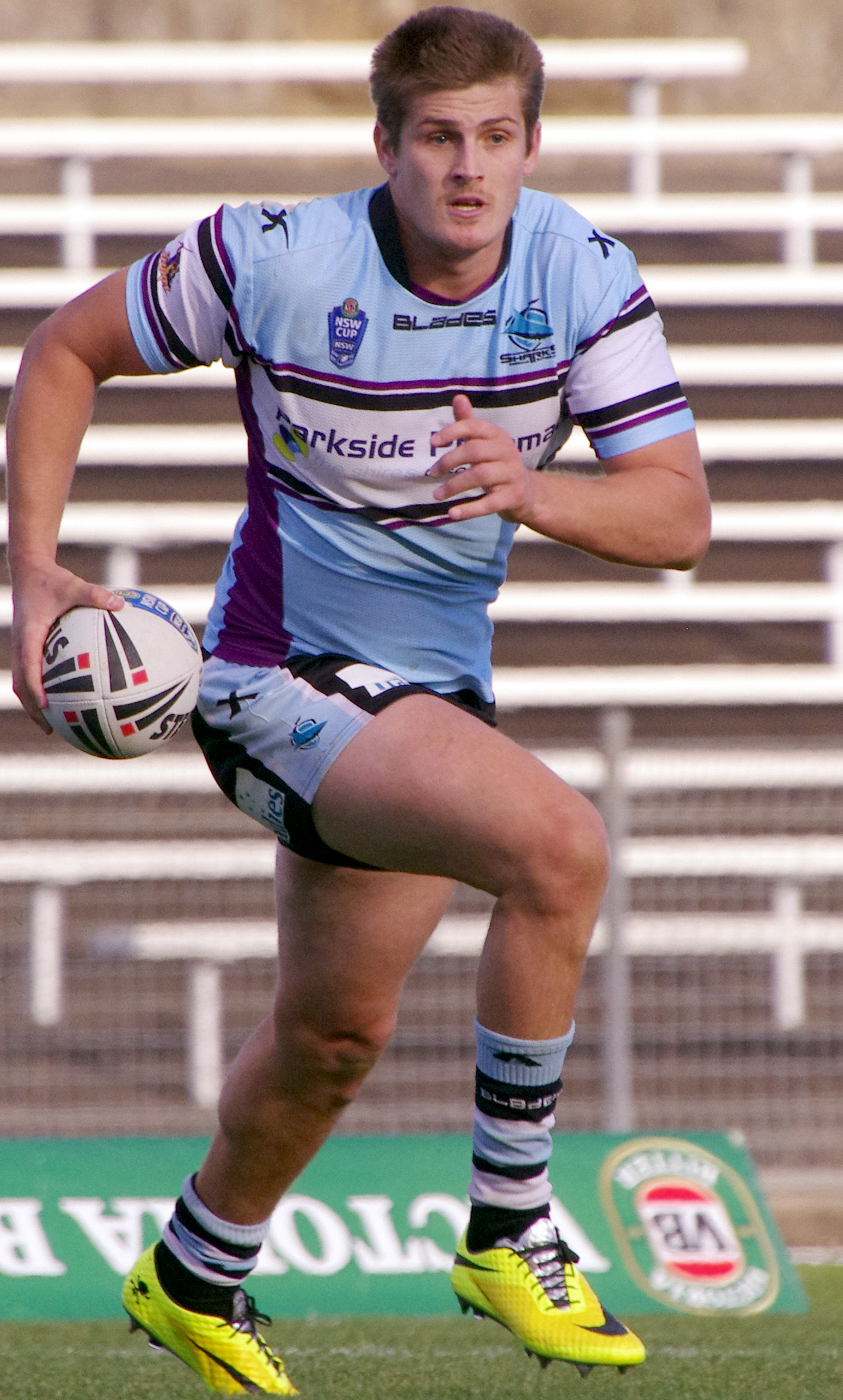

Personal information
- Full name: Blake Ayshford
- Born: 15 April 1988 (age 38) Paddington, New South Wales, Australia

Playing information
- Height: 190 cm (6 ft 3 in)
- Weight: 98 kg (15 st 6 lb)
- Position: Centre, Lock
Club
Years	Team	Pld	T	G	FG	P
2009–13	Wests Tigers	104	33	0	0	132
2014–15	Cronulla Sharks	20	1	0	0	4
2016–19	New Zealand Warriors	50	13	0	0	52
	Total	174	47	0	0	188
- Education: Endeavour Sports High School
- Relatives: Bruce Ayshford (uncle)

Blake Ayshford (born 15 April 1988) is an Australian former professional rugby league footballer who played as a centre in the 2000s and 2010s.

He played for the Wests Tigers, Cronulla-Sutherland Sharks and New Zealand Warriors in the NRL.

== Background ==
Ayshford played his junior football with the Paddington-Woollahra Tigers and Coogee Randwick Wombats, representing the 2007 Junior Kangaroos & New South Wales at an under 17s and under 19s level. In 2006 he played for Endeavour Sports High School when they won the Arrive Alive Cup.

Blake's uncle, Bruce, played for Easts in 1969. He is of Irish descent

== Playing career ==
Ayshford played in the junior grades with the Sydney Roosters, before signing with the Wests Tigers.

=== Wests Tigers ===
Ayshford played for the Tigers' NYC side where, in 2008, he was named the Player's Player of the Year.

He made his first grade debut in Round 11 of the 2009 NRL season, playing against the Brisbane Broncos on 22 May. In June 2009, it was announced that Ayshford had signed a two-year contract to remain with the Tigers until the end of the 2011 season. Later that year he signed an extension to the end of the 2012 season. At the end of the 2009 season, Ayshford was named the Wests Tigers' Rookie of the Year.

Ayshford cemented his position in the centres in 2010. After his form dipped, the threat of being dropped saw an improved performance towards the end of the season. Before the start of the 2011 season, Ricky Stuart named Ayshford in a "Blues in Waiting" squad, for potential future NSW State of Origin players.

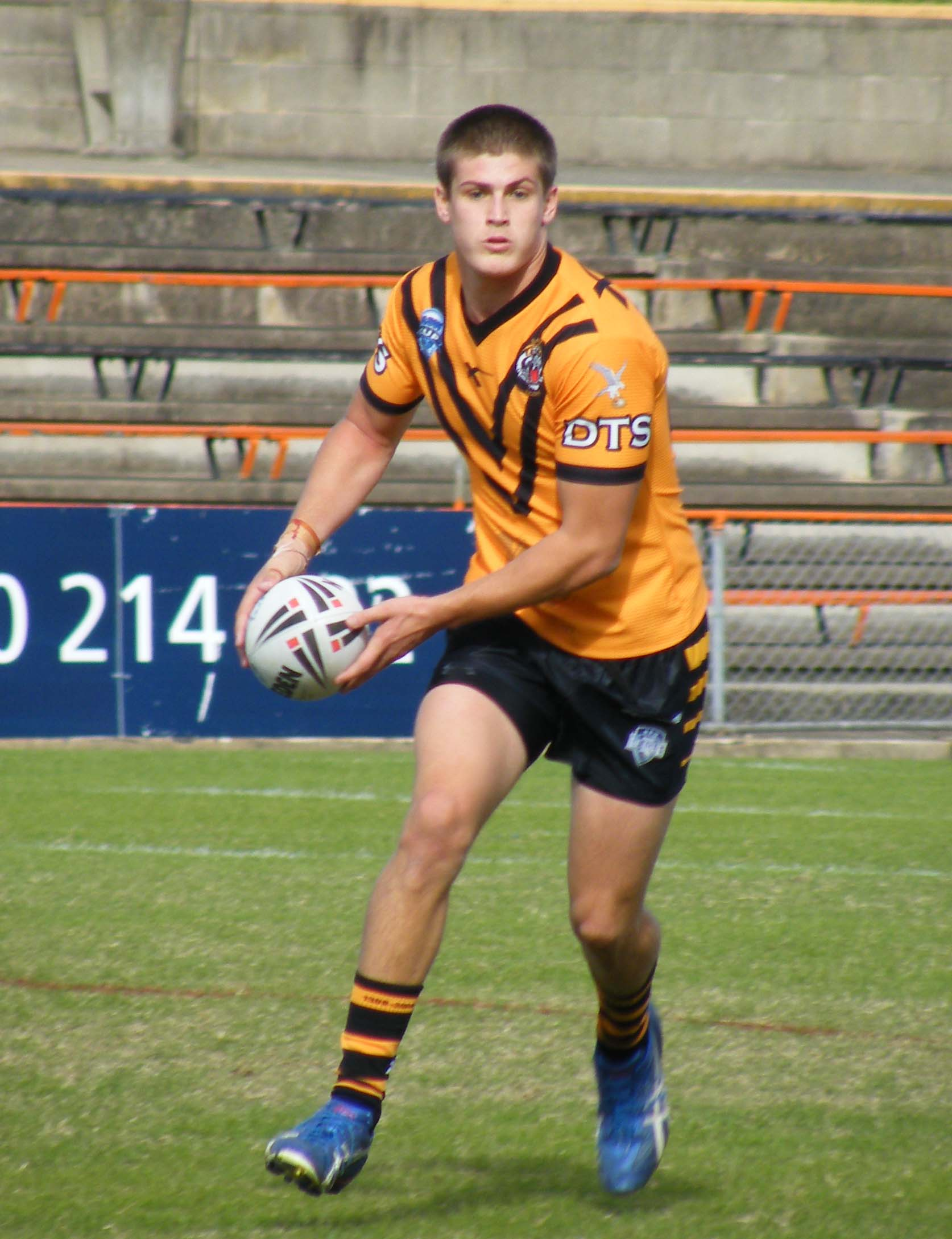
Blake Ayshford playing for Balmain

In May 2011, Ayshford committed himself to the Wests Tigers for a further 3 years, keeping him at the club until 2015. He played in every game of the 2011 season, scoring 11 tries, and was named the Wests Tigers Members Player of the Year.

Having "bulked-up" for the 2012 season, Ayshford said, "People say it's hard to adjust to playing with extra weight but I feel stronger and fitter when I'm weighing more. It just gives me a bit of confidence to know that I'm playing over 100 kilos." However, 2012 was a relative disappointment, with Ayshford playing from the bench in some games, and scoring a career-low 4 tries. Ayshford later said, "It was the first year I've been on the bench, first time in my life starting on the bench actually. I let myself down in certain areas."

2013 was another disappointing season for Ayshford, with just two tries and four wins from his sixteen appearances. On 12 July 2013 it was announced that Ayshford would be joining the Cronulla-Sutherland Sharks on a two-year contract from 2014.

=== Cronulla-Sutherland Sharks ===
In Round 1 of the 2014 NRL season against the Gold Coast Titans, Ayshford made his club debut for the Cronulla-Sutherland Sharks at centre in the Sharks 18–12 loss at Remondis Stadium. Ayshford made 16 appearances for Cronulla-Sutherland in his first year at the club as they endured one of their worst seasons finishing last.

=== New Zealand Warriors ===
In September 2015 Ayshford signed for the New Zealand Warriors for the 2016 and 2017 seasons.

In June 2017, Ayshford signed a further two-year contract, committing both parties until the end of the 2019 season.

In Round 19 of the 2019 NRL season against Parramatta, Ayshford was famously palmed off by Parramatta player Maika Sivo on his way to the try line. Fox Sports commentator Andrew Voss said of Sivo's fend on Ayshford "If you can get a charge for palming blokes in the sternum, Sivo’s looking at 10 weeks",. On 2 August 2019, Ayshford announced that he would be retiring at the end of the 2019 season.

Ayshford's final game as a player came against Canberra at Canberra Stadium in round 25 of the 2019 NRL season which New Zealand won 24–20.
