= Joe Williams (rugby league) =

Australian rugby league footballer (born 1983)

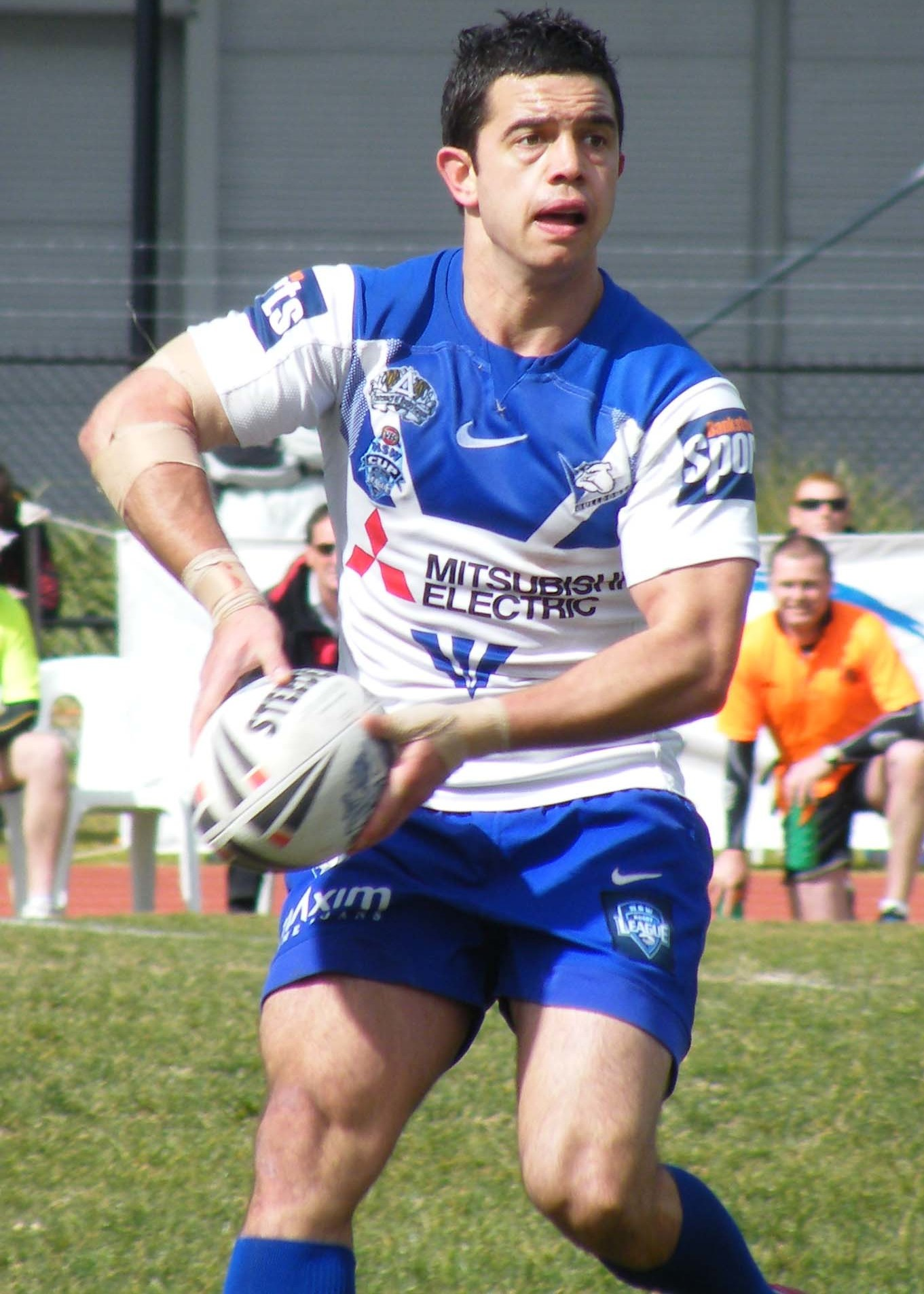

Personal information
- Full name: Joe Williams
- Born: 4 September 1983 (age 43) Cowra, New South Wales, Australia

Playing information
- Height: 175 cm (5 ft 9 in)
- Weight: 80 kg (12 st 8 lb)
- Position: Halfback, Five-eighth
Club
Years	Team	Pld	T	G	FG	P
2004–07	South Sydney	46	7	126	4	284
2008	Penrith Panthers	1	0	2	0	4
2008	Canterbury Bulldogs	2	0	0	0	0
	Total	49	7	128	4	288
- Education: Marcellin College Randwick
- Father: Wilfred Williams

Joe Williams (born 4 September 1983) is a Wiradjuri/Wolgalu man and a former Australian sportsman who played rugby league and boxed as a professional. He is now a motivational speaker and psychologist.

His rugby league football career spanned from 2004 to 2008 and included appearances as a halfback and five-eighth with the Canterbury-Bankstown Bulldogs, Penrith Panthers and the South Sydney Rabbitohs in the NRL.

== Background ==
Williams was born in Cowra, New South Wales, Australia.

== Playing career ==
A Cowra Magpies junior who moved to South Sydney Rabbitohs lower grades. He was educated at Marcellin College Randwick, Williams was selected to play for the 2001 Australian Schoolboys.

In 2002, Williams kicked the winning field goal in the 2002 Jersey Flegg Grand Final in the Sydney Roosters victory over the St George Illawarra Dragons. Williams joined South Sydney after failing to break into the Sydney Roosters first grade side. He made his debut for South Sydney in round 12 of the 2004 NRL season against Cronulla-Sutherland which ended in a 38–18 loss at Shark Park. Williams played 14 games for Souths in his debut season as the club finished last on the table. The following two seasons at Souths proved to be difficult as Williams was part of the side which finished last in 2006 and narrowly avoided the wooden spoon in 2005.

During the 2007 NRL season, Williams played in the first semi-final Souths had reached since 1989. They were defeated by Manly 30–6 at Brookvale Oval. As he had played 9 games for feeder club North Sydney Bears in the NSW Cup, he was eligible to play in the rest of the finals series. They made it through to the Grand Final, only to be narrowly defeated by Parramatta 20–15, after a late try was awarded after a dubious decision. Williams had kicked a field goal with 3 minutes remaining to make the score 15-14 until Parramatta scored a try with 20 seconds remaining through Weller Hauraki.

In September 2007, Williams signed a one-year contract to play with the Penrith Panthers for the 2008 NRL season after initially agreeing to a contract with French side, Toulouse Olympique.

He was released from his Penrith Panthers contract on 14 May 2008 and joined Canterbury-Bankstown.

After only two games with Canterbury-Bankstown, Williams retired from the game and turned to boxing. His final game in the NRL was a 58–18 loss against the Canberra Raiders in round 15 of the 2008 NRL season. Canterbury would go on to finish last at the end of 2008.

He last played with Country Rugby League side Dubbo CYMS and later coached them in 2012.

== Career stats ==
- First Grade Debut: 2004 - Round 12, Souths v Cronulla-Sutherland Sharks at Toyota Park, 29 May, scoring three goals
- North Sydney Bears: 2007-2010 19 appearances 7 tries, 54 goals, 3 field goals, 133 points.

== Boxing career ==
On 18 October 2014 he successfully defended his World Boxing Federation (WBF) junior welterweight world title against Indonesian opponent Rusmin Kie Raha at Bolton Park Stadium. He also obtained a World Boxing Association (WBA) Asian title with a unanimous points victory.

== Personal life ==
Joe Williams is the son of Wilfred Williams, who played for a number of Sydney teams in the late 1980s.

He has spoken about his battles with depression, especially during his time in Rugby League. In October 2014, a short story called The Enemy Within was released. He currently works as a motivational speaker in the field of mental health.

In this work he has received the following awards the Suicide Prevention Australia Life Award in 2018 and, in 2019, the National Mental Health Prize.

In October 2016 Williams visited the Standing Rock Indian Reservation during the Dakota Access Pipeline protests, carrying an Australian Aboriginal flag to demonstrate solidarity between Aboriginal Australians and Native Americans.
