= Jim Tuckey =

Australian rugby league footballer

Personal information
- Born: 31 March 1899
- Died: 30 April 1997 (aged 98)

Playing information

Rugby union
- Position: Forward
Club
Years	Team	Pld	T	G	FG	P
1922	Eastern Suburbs

Rugby league
- Position: Second-row, Prop, Hooker
Club
Years	Team	Pld	T	G	FG	P
1924	Eastern Suburbs	6	0	0	0	0

Jim Tuckey (Note: The name is given as Jim Tuckey on the Sydney Roosters Honour Roll, although it was listed as C. Tuckey in 2022. C. Tuckey appears in several sources as does E. and G. Tuckey. Newspaper reports for the Eastern Suburbs match against Balmain (24 May 1924) use all three with the Mudgee Guardian giving the name here as Jim Tuckey and elsewhere as James Tuckey.) (31 March 1899 – 30 April 1997) was a rugby league footballer in Australia's major competition, the New South Wales Rugby League (NSWRL).

In the early 1920s, Jim Tuckey played for Coolah in the Dunedoo district football competition. In 1922, he moved to Sydney to join the police force, but having been unsuccessful in this he remained in Sydney where he played rugby union for the Eastern Suburbs. The following year, Tuckey was playing for the Eastern Suburbs rugby league club in the reserve grade. He made his first grade debut in the opening match of the 1924 season against Newtown, and his final appearance in August 1924 in a City Cup match against South Sydney in which he left the game with a fractured rib.
