= Mal Connor =

Australian rugby league footballer

Personal information
- Full name: Mal Connor

Playing information
- Position: Hooker
Club
Years	Team	Pld	T	G	FG	P
1976–1980	Eastern Suburbs	34	5	0	0	15

Mal Connor was an Australian former professional rugby league footballer in the New South Wales Rugby League (NSWRL) premiership.

Connor played for the Eastern Suburbs club in the years 1976 and 1977 as well as 1979 to 1980. A hooker, Connor played in the Easts side that defeated St George Dragons in the final of the 1977 mid-week cup competition.

Connor died in August 2021.
