= Ron Booth =

Australian rugby league footballer

Playing information
- Position: Fullback
Club
Years	Team	Pld	T	G	FG	P
1952–1956	Eastern Suburbs	65	5	138	0	291

Ron 'Snowy' Booth was an Australian rugby league player in the New South Wales Rugby League (NSWRL) competition.

Booth, a goal-kicking fullback, played for the Eastern Suburbs club in the years 1952 to 1956. He was recruited from the Randwick rugby union club.

In 1953, Booth made one of the club's rare semi-finals appearances during that period. It was Easts' first semi-final since winning the 1945 premiership. The euphoria was short lived however, with the Tri-colours losing to the St George Dragons, 25 points to 7, with Booth kicking two goals.
