= Larry O'Shea =

Australian rugby league player

== Background ==
Larry O'Shea was born on May 12, 1916.

Larry O'Shea
Playing information
- Position: Prop, second-row
Club
Years	Team	Pld	T	G	FG	P
1941–42	Eastern Suburbs	4	1	0	0	3

== Career ==
Larry O'Shea was an Australian rugby league player in the club named Eastern Suburbs (sometimes called Easts) in the New South Wales Rugby Football League (NSWRFL) competition. A prop or second-row forward, he made a total of four appearances for the Eastern Suburbs in 1941 and 1942, scoring one try.
