= Maurie Kilkeary =

Australian rugby league player

Playing information
- Position: Winger
Club
Years	Team	Pld	T	G	FG	P
1940	Eastern Suburbs	1	0	0	0	0

Maurie Kilkeary was an Australian rugby league footballer who played one match as a winger for the Eastern Suburbs against Newtown in 1940.
