= Wilfred Williams (rugby league) =

Australian rugby league footballer

Personal information
- Full name: Wilfred Williams
- Born: 10 July 1960 (age 65) Cowra, New South Wales, Australia

Playing information
- Position: Centre, Wing
Club
| Years | Team | Pld | T | G | FG | P |
|---|---|---|---|---|---|---|
| 1985 | Eastern Suburbs | 7 | 1 | 0 | 0 | 4 |
| 1986 | Western Suburbs | 22 | 1 | 0 | 0 | 4 |
| 1987 | St. George Dragons | 17 | 2 | 0 | 0 | 8 |
| | Total | 46 | 4 | 0 | 0 | 16 |
Representative
| Years | Team | Pld | T | G | FG | P |
| 1984 | NSW Country | 1 | 0 | 0 | 0 | 0 |
- Source: As of 30 December 2022
- Relatives: Joe Williams (son)

Wilfred Williams is an Australian former professional rugby league footballer who played in the 1980s. He played for Eastern Suburbs, Western Suburbs and St. George and in the NSWRL competition.

== Background ==
Williams is the father of former rugby league player Joe Williams.

== Playing career ==
In 1984, Williams represented NSW Country against NSW City. Williams made his first grade debut for Eastern Suburbs in round 1 of the 1985 NSWRL season against arch rivals South Sydney. Williams played from the bench in a 34-16 loss. In 1986, Williams signed for Western Suburbs and made 22 appearances as the club finished second last on the table. Williams played one final season in the NSWRL with St. George in 1987.
