= Brad Pike =

Australian rugby league player

Playing information
- Position: Prop
Club
Years	Team	Pld	T	G	FG	P
1995	Sydney City Roosters	2	0	0	0	0

Brad Pike is a former Australian professional rugby league player. A prop, he made two appearances for the Sydney City Roosters during the 1995 ARL season.
