= J Spence =

Australian rugby league footballer

J Spence was a professional rugby league footballer in the Australian competition, the New South Wales Rugby League. Spence played for the Eastern Suburbs club in the 1932 season.
