= Wade Humphries =

Australian rugby league footballer

Personal information
- Full name: Wade Humphries
- Born: 7 June 1981 (age 45)

Playing information
- Position: Hooker
Club
Years	Team	Pld	T	G	FG	P
2002	Sydney Roosters	2	0	0	0	0
- Source: As of 20 January 2023

Wade Humphries sometimes spelt "Humphreys" is an Australian former professional rugby league footballer who played in the 2000s. He played for the Sydney Roosters in the NRL competition.

== Playing career ==
Humphries made his first grade debut for the Sydney Roosters in round 17 of the 2002 NRL season against Canberra. Humphries started at hooker in the clubs 36-6 victory. Humphries played one further game for the club which was the following week against Melbourne.

== Personal life ==
In 2007, Humphries married the daughter of former rugby league player and coach Chris Anderson.
