= Terry Matthews (rugby league) =

Australian rugby league footballer

Terry Matthews is an Australian former professional rugby league footballer who played in the 1960s. He played in the New South Wales Rugby Football League premiership.

Mathews is the 535th player to represent the Eastern Suburbs rugby league football club. He played 56 matches for the Roosters in the years (1963–66).
