= Theo Lang =

Australian rugby league player

Playing information
- Position: Hooker
Club
Years	Team	Pld	T	G	FG	P
1934	Eastern Suburbs	1	0	0	0	0

Theo Lang was an Australian rugby league footballer who played one match as a hooker for the Eastern Suburbs against Balmain in 1934.
