= Kel Judd =

Australian rugby league player

Personal information
- Born: 21 April 1958 (age 66)

Playing information
- Position: Prop
Club
Years	Team	Pld	T	G	FG	P
1979, 1983	Eastern Suburbs	7	0	0	0	0

Kel Judd (born 21 April 1958) is a former Australian professional rugby league player. A prop, Judd played one match for the Eastern Suburbs during the 1979 NSWRFL season, and made a further six appearances for the club in 1983.
