= Bert Zara =

Australian rugby league footballer

Personal information
- Full name: Bert Zara
- Born: 23 June 1949 (age 77) Sydney, New South Wales, Australia

Playing information
- Position: Second-row, Prop
Club
Years	Team	Pld	T	G	FG	P
1969–75	Eastern Suburbs	6	0	0	0	0

Bert Zara (born in Sydney, New South Wales) is an Australian former rugby league footballer for the Eastern Suburbs club in the New South Wales Rugby League premiership competition.

== Career playing statistics ==
=== Point scoring summary ===
Games	Tries	Goals	F/G	Points
6	-	-	-	0

=== Matches played ===
Team	Matches	Years
Eastern Suburbs	6	1969-1975
