= Fred Graber =

Australian rugby league footballer (1931-2012)

Personal information
- Born: 14 April 1931 China
- Died: 11 November 2012 (aged 81)

Playing information
- Position: Wing
Club
| Years | Team | Pld | T | G | FG | P |
|---|---|---|---|---|---|---|
| 1956 | Eastern Suburbs | 1 |
| 1958 | Western Suburbs | 2 | 1 | 0 | 0 | 3 |
| | Total | 3 | 1 | 0 | 0 | 3 |

Fred Graber was a professional rugby league footballer in the Australian competition, the New South Wales Rugby League. Graber played for the Eastern Suburbs club in the year 1956. He also played for the Western Suburbs club in 1958.
