= Todd Ollivier =

Australian rugby player

Personal information
- Born: 7 July 1979 (age 45)

Playing information
- Height: 190 cm (6 ft 3 in)
- Weight: 106 kg (234 lb; 16 st 10 lb)

Rugby league
- Position: Prop forward
Club
Years	Team	Pld	T	G	FG	P
2003–04	Sydney Roosters	1	0	0	0	0

Rugby union
- Position: Third row
Club
Years	Team	Pld	T	G	FG	P
1999–02	Eastern Suburbs	36	18	0	0	10
2001–01	New South Wales Waratahs	7	0	0	0	0
2004–05	Béziers
2006–07	Rugby Roma Olimpic
	Total	43	18	0	0	10

Todd Ollivier (born 7 July 1979) is a former Australian professional dual-code rugby player. He was the Sydney Club Competition Rookie of the Year in 2000, playing for the Eastern Suburbs Rugby Union Football Club. He earned seven caps for the New South Wales Waratahs, before switching codes and making one appearance in 2003 for the Sydney Roosters of the National Rugby League (NRL). Shortly after, he returned to rugby union, playing for French Top 16 side Béziers (2004–05) and Italian Super 10 sides Petrarca Rugby (2006–07) and Rugby Roma Olimpic (2008–10).
