= Norm Rogers (rugby league) =

Australian rugby league footballer

Norm Rogers (22 November 1922 – 6 October 1989) was a rugby league footballer in the New South Wales Rugby League (NSWRL) competition. Rogers, a centre, played for the Eastern Suburbs club in the years 1946–49. Rogers is the father of Olympic swimmers Greg and Neil Rogers.

== Sources ==
- Whiticker, Alan & Hudson, Glen (2006) The Encyclopedia of Rugby League Players, Gavin Allen Publishing, Sydney
