= Taylor Losalu =

Australian rugby league footballer (born 2005)

Personal information
- Full name: Taylor Losalu
- Born: 15 November 2002 (age 23) Parramatta, New South Wales, Australia
- Height: 183 cm (6 ft 0 in)
- Weight: 105 kg (16 st 7 lb)

Playing information
- Position: Prop
Club
Years	Team	Pld	T	G	FG	P
2025–	Sydney Roosters	8	0	0	0	0
- Source: As of 4 September 2026

Taylor Losalu (born 15 November 2002) is an Australian professional rugby league footballer who plays as a prop for the Sydney Roosters in the National Rugby League.

== Career ==
In 2024, Losalu played for the Roosters in their NSW cup side. At the end of the year he was awarded the NSW Cup Player of the Year for the Roosters.

=== 2025 ===
In Round 1 2025, Losalu made his NRL debut against the Brisbane Broncos at Allianz Stadium coming off the bench. Losalu made headlines the following day after the match, as he had returned to work with his father at his concreting company following the victory. Losalu had revealed that he thought it would be a quick cameo and he was on shift when he received a call from coach Trent Robinson asking why he wasn't at training.

In Round 2 against the Penrith Panthers, Losalu started his first game at Prop.

On 15 April, it was announced that Losalu had his contract upgraded for the rest of the season. On 21 April, the Roosters announced that Losalu had re-signed with the club until the end of 2027.
