= J O'Donnell =

Australian rugby league footballer

Jack O'Donnell
Personal information
- Born: 7 January 1902
- Died: 2 January 1990 (aged 87)

Playing information
- Position: Lock, Second-row, Prop
Club
Years	Team	Pld	T	G	FG	P
1923	Eastern Suburbs	3	0	0	0	0

J O'Donnell (Sydney) was a professional rugby league footballer in Australia's leading competition – the New South Wales Rugby League (NSWRL).

O'Donnell, a forward, played for the Eastern Suburbs club in the 1923 season and is recognised as that club's 142nd player.
