= Wally Freeman (rugby league) =

Australian rugby league footballer

Wally Freeman was an Australian rugby league footballer in the New South Wales Rugby League (NSWRL).

Freeman played for the Eastern Suburbs club in the 1919 season. Wally is the grandfather of former coach Phil Gould.
