= Larry Hedger =

Australian rugby league footballer

Personal information
- Full name: Larry Hedger
- Born: 6 April 1908
- Died: 8 October 1988 (aged 80)

Playing information
- Position: Halfback, Centre, Five-eighth
Club
Years	Team	Pld	T	G	FG	P
1926–29	Eastern Suburbs	44	14	1	0	44
- Source: As of 26 March 2019
- Relatives: Grant Hedger

Larry Hedger was an Australian rugby league footballer who played in the 1920s. He played for Eastern Suburbs in the NSWRL competition.

== Playing career ==
Hedger made his first grade debut for Eastern Suburbs in Round 5 1926 against Newtown at the Marrickville Oval.

Eastern Suburbs finished 2nd on the table that year and eventually reached the semi-final against arch rivals South Sydney but lost the match 21–5 with Hedger playing at halfback.

The following year, Eastern Suburbs again reached the finals but were defeated by St George 26–11 at Earl Park, Arncliffe. Hedger played at centre in this match.

In 1928, Hedger was part of the Easts side which claimed the minor premiership and reached the grand final against Souths who were looking for their 4th premiership in a row. Hedger played at centre as Easts were comprehensively beaten 26–5 in the final which was played at the Royal Agricultural Society Grounds.

Hedger played on in 1929 before retiring at the end of the season.
