= Tony Stavrianos =

Australian rugby league footballer

Tony Stavrianos (Australia) was a rugby league footballer who played for the Eastern Suburbs club in the years 1962–64. Stavrianos died on 24 June 2017.
