= Grant Hedger =

Australian rugby league footballer

Personal information
- Born: 6 April 1952 (age 72); Bondi, New South Wales, Australia

Playing information
- Position: Forward
Club
Years	Team	Pld	T	G	FG	P
1975–78	Eastern Suburbs	38	1	0	0	3
- Source: Rugby League Project As of 21 November 2024
- Relatives: Larry Hedger

Grant Hedger (Bondi, New South Wales) is an Australian former professional rugby league footballer who played in the 1970s. He played in Australia's major competition – the New South Wales Rugby League (NSWRL).

Hedger played for the Eastern Suburbs club, progressing through the lower grades he made his 1st grade debut in 1975. The hard working Rugby league Forward played in 36 matches for the Eastern Suburbs Roosters in the years 1975–78. During the 1976 NSWRFL season, Hedger played in the forwards to help Eastern Suburbs claim victory in their unofficial 1976 World Club Challenge match against British champions St. Helens in Sydney.

During his first season Hedger was a member of Easts' premiership winning side that defeated St George by a record 38–0 margin.
