= Bob Norval =

Australian rugby league player

Personal information
- Full name: Robert Norval

Playing information
- Position: Hooker
Club
Years	Team	Pld	T	G	FG	P
1940	Eastern Suburbs	1	0	0	0	0

Robert Norval was an Australian rugby league footballer who played one match as a hooker for the Eastern Suburbs against North Sydney in 1940.
