= Paul Busch (rugby league) =

Australian rugby league footballer

Playing information
- Position: Five-eighth, Fullback
Club
Years	Team	Pld	T	G	FG	P
1990–91	Eastern Suburbs	8	1	3	0	10

Paul Busch is an Australian former professional rugby league footballer who played for Eastern Suburbs.

Busch played first-grade for Eastern Suburbs in 1990 and 1991, as a five-eighth and fullback. Most of his appearances came in the 1991 NSWRL season, where he featured in every game from round 10 to round 16. He was the goalkicker for Eastern Suburbs in the opening round of the 1992 NSWRL season against South Sydney, which was his last first-grade appearance.
