= Edward Coyne (rugby league) =

Australian rugby league footballer

Edward Coyne was a rugby league footballer in the Australian competition the New South Wales Rugby League (NSWRL).

Coyne played for the Eastern Suburbs club in the 1916, 1918 and 1919 seasons.
