= 1923 Eastern Suburbs season =

← 1922	1924 →

Eastern Suburbs (now known as the Sydney Roosters) competed in the 16th New South Wales Rugby League season in 1923.

== Details ==
- Home Ground: Sydney Sports Ground
- Coach: Ray Norman
- Line ups:-

No.

Position
Player

66 Jack 'Bluey' Watkins – SR 86 Harry Caples (C) – FE 96 Gordon Wright – WG 103 Sid Kaufman – HB 110 Edward Connerton – SR 114 Ed 'Snowy' Rigney – FB 123 Harold Holmes – HK 124 Bill Ives – SR 127 Arthur Oxford – PR 129 Les Steel – WG

No.

Position
Player

135 Jack Dawson – HK 136 Tom Molloy – SR 137 Bill Richards – HK 138 Cyril Abotomey – WG 139 Frank Egan – HK 140 V. Kennedy – HK 141 Tom Fitzpatrick – HK 142 J. O'Donnell – HK 143 R. Wittrien – HK 144 George Agar – WG

== Results ==
- Premiership Round 1, 5 May 1923;

Eastern Suburbs '’’21’’’ (5 Tries; 3 Goals) defeated University ‘’’5’’’ (1 Try; 1 Goal) at the Sydney Sports Ground.

- Premiership Round 2, 2 May 1923;

Eastern Suburbs 14(2 Tries; 4 Goals)) defeated Newtown 8( 2 Tries; 1 Goal) at the Sydney Sports Ground

- Premiership Round. 3, 19 May 1923;

South Sydney 15 defeated Eastern Suburbs 5 At the Sydney Sports Ground;

- Premiership Round 4, 26 May 1923;

Western Suburbs 19 beat Eastern Suburbs 14 at Pratten Park

- Premiership Round 5, 2 June 1923.

Eastern Suburbs 4 beat St George 0 at Sydney Sports Ground

- Premiership Round 6, 9 June 1923*

Eastern Suburbs 16 beat North Sydney 8 at Sydney Cricket Ground

- Premiership Round 7 - Eastern Suburbs had the bye.

•Premiership Round 8, 30 June 1923. Eastern Suburbs 13(3 Tries; 2 Goals) beat Glebe 3 (1 Try) at Birchgrove Oval

- Premiership Round 9, 7 July 1923;

Eastern Suburbs 10 beat Balmain 8 at Sydney Sports Ground.

- Premiership Round 10, 14 July;

Eastern Suburbs 12 beat University 5 at Sydney Cricket Ground

- Premiership Round 11 21 July

Eastern Suburbs 25 beat Newtown 5 at Sydney Cricket Ground No. 2

- Premiership Round 12 28 July,

Eastern Suburb 19 ( Steel 2, Caples, Agar tries; Oxford 2 Goals ) beat South Sydney 5 ( V. Lawrence try; J. Lawrence ), at the Sydney Sports Ground.

"Eastern Suburbs moved to the outright lead of the premiership with victory over arch rival's South Sydney"

"South Sydney attacked, and for a few minutes play was in the Eastern Suburbs 25’ The clever work of Johnston and Blair behind the scrum was noticeable. Off side play by Horne on his own side of half way gave Oxford a chance at goal, but his attempt failed, and South Sydney forced. The heavy state of the ground was against spectacular passing movements and play was mostly confined to the forwards, Watkins, picking up after loose play ran strongly and transferred to Steel, who had no difficulty in Crossing. Oxford failed at goal. Eastern Suburbs, 3-0 Within a few moments Caples obtained from a scrum and after a brilliant run, in which he successfully "dummied" to an opponent, forced his way over for a try, notwithstanding a determined tackle by Gillespie. Oxford goalled, and Eastern Suburbs led 8-0. South Sydney now took a turn at attacking, and a faulty line kicks by Rigney enabled them to place Eastern Suburbs on the defensive. Caples and Steel stemmed the attack, and after Individual bursts by Blair and Wearing the ball was sent to V. Lawrence, who brushed aside a tackle by Steel, running nicely along the wing, scored in the corner. Quinlivan failed at goal Eastern Suburbs, 8-3. Numerous breaches of the scrummaging rules occurred, South Sidney being chiefly at fault. The next try was scored by Caples, who received the ball from Kaufman, after the latter had broken away rapidly from a scrum in South Sydney's 25’. Oxford converted and Eastern Suburbs led, 13 to 3. J Lawrence soon after kicked a penalty goal making the scores Eastern Suburbs 13to 5. Just before the interval the best movement of the game took place. Kaufman secured from a scrum, and sent the ball to Watkins to Caples, to Agar, who crossed. Oxford missed the goal, and half time came with Eastern Suburbs leading by 16 to 5. On resuming South Sydney assumed the offensive and brought play to Eastern Suburbs' 25, from where J Lawrence missed an easy shot at goal from a penalty. South Sidney maintained the pressure and kept Eastern Suburbs defending Watkins earned applause for pluckily going down on the ball when facing strong opposition, and soon after Dawson with a tricky run, In which he cleverly

eluded several opponents, transferred play to South Sydney's area. The game was now fast and open, South Sydney were holding the advantage in the scrums, but the spoiling tactics of Watkins and Kaufman, aided by sound tackling prevented openings. A great movement initiated by Kaufman, who secured from a scrum and sent the ball to Steel, resulted in the latter, after a swift clever run crossing the line Eastern Suburbs, 19-5. Desperate attacks by South Sydney ensued, and on one occasion Wearing threatened danger, but was frustrated by the cleverness of Rigney and Abotomey. The deadly tackling of the Eastern Suburbs' backs and the splendid judgment of Caples, who frequently rested his side by kicking for the line, were features of this half. The closing stages were marked by exciting play The ball travelled rapidly up and down field, likely scoring movements for both sides were frequent. The final Scores were Eastern Suburbs’ 19 points to 5."

- Premiership Round 13 4 August

SatuPremiership Rounday 4 August 1923 Eastern Suburbs 22 beat Western Suburbs 8 at Sydney Cricket Ground

- Premiership Round 14 11 August

Eastern Suburbs 24 beat St George 2 at Sydney Sports Ground

- Premiership Round 15 18 August

Eastern Suburbs 12 (Caples, Watkins tries; Oxford 3 goals) beat North Sydney 10 (Peters, Blinkhorn tries; Hodgins, Horder goals) at Sydney Cricket Ground

"Caples sent the ball into touch from the kick off. An unsuccessful dash by Eastern Suburbs was followed by an exchange of kicks by the backline. Dawson made a strong run, and kicked over the line for Waterhouse to force. Horder made a fine attempt at goal from a free, the ball striking the cross bar. The Eastern Suburbs threequarters moved smartly In attack, but their handling of the ball was not sure. North Sydney, however, had to be constantly on the alert in defending, for their opponents made series of sudden sharp advances. Horder, however after a few attempts made an opening. Faull and Baker joined him the latter sending on to Peters who outpaced a number of would be tackers and scored behind the goal. Hodgins converted, North Sydney, a rally by Eastern Suburbs looked promising, Abotomey being well taken by Courtney. Blinkhorn put in some good work that brought his side along, but breaches nullified his efforts. In North Sydney's half a number of scrums were questioned by the referee. Then from one Kaufman broke away, brushed Farnell aside and passed to Caples who ran over for a neat try. Oxford kicked the goal making the scores 5 all. Kaufmann who was displaying cleverness In dodging through his opponents was soon prominent again but lost time in looking round for support when his own chance of scoring was bright. North Sydney were kept on the defensive, and Holmes dashed over from a pass that was forward. A free kept Eastern Suburbs back, and Rigney was several times called on to use his catching and kicking powers. North Sydney then came out swiftly, and Peters sent on to Blinkhorn whose pace carried him through for a try. Hodgkins missed the goal. North Sydney, 8 to at half time. Eastern Suburbs looked dangerous early in the second half, following a low line kick by Caples. Blinkhorn relieved and North Svdney came through, with Horder Prominent but unlucky.Fioin n from a free Oxford drove the ball just under the bar, and as Waterthouse tried to run out Eastern Suburbs closed up In attack. They were opposed by rather weak defence and continued to press with great zest. Steel and Dawson were conspicuous with good runs, Oxford had a couple of Unsuccessful shots at goal. North Sydney contrived to work the ball out with the crowd eagerly expectant when Horder and Blinkhorn handled. They had little room to move, however, and Eastern Suburbs were soon attacking. Waterhouse’s kick, which had gone towards the centre of the field, where Agar marked, and Oxford added a goal. North Sydney 8 to 7. Rapid passing and fine combinations enabled Eastern Suburbs to control the game for some time. Once Caples obtained and pushed of player after player before being tackled. Caples also started Steel, but after a smart run, the latter was brought down. Both teams were playing very earnestly at this stage, and several on each side were cautioned for illegal tactics. Horder kicked a good goal from a penalty agairst Eastern Suburbs, and North Sydney led by 10 points to 7. Back to North Sydney’s line, the ball was handled skilfully by the Eastern Suburbs threequarters, but it remained for Watkins to bring the scores level with a try. Oxford missed the goal that would have placed his side in the lead. Eastern Suburbs continued to press and Hodgkins kicked out for Rigney to mark Oxford this time landed a goal giving Eastern Suburbs the victory in the last minute, as the final whistle sounded immediately afterwards."

- Premiership Round 16 25 August - Bye: Eastern Suburbs;
- Premiership Round 17 1 September

Eastern Suburbs 13 beat Glebe 11 at Sydney Cricket Ground

- Premiership Round 18, Saturday 8 September 1923;

Balmain 12 beat Eastern Suburbs 11 at Sydney Sports Ground

By losing their final round match, Eastern Suburbs were joined by traditional rivals South Sydney in the top spot, this resulted in a final needing to be played to determine the premiers for that season.

== Ladder ==
	Team	Pld	W	D	L	B	PF	PA	PD	Pts
1	Eastern Suburbs	16	13	0	3	2	235	124	+111	30
2	South Sydney	16	13	0	3	2	242	173	+69	30
3	Balmain	16	10	1	5	2	247	136	+111	25
4	Western Suburbs	16	9	0	7	2	257	218	+39	22
5	North Sydney	16	8	0	8	2	245	223	+22	20
6	Glebe	16	6	0	10	2	160	193	-33	16
7	St. George	16	5	0	11	2	168	236	-68	14
8	Newtown	16	4	2	10	2	161	297	-136	14
9	University	16	2	1	13	2	120	235	-115	9

== Grand final ==
Eastern Suburbs	Position	South Sydney
Ed Rigney	FB	Howard Hallett
Cyril Abotomey	WG	Benny Wearing
Jack Dawson	CE	Tom Barry
Les Steel	CE	Vic Lawrence
George Agar	WG	Oscar Quinlivan
Harry Caples (c)	FE	Bill Gillespie (c)
Sid Kaufman	HB	A. Johnstone
Arthur Oxford	PR	David Watson
Bill Richards	HK	Pat Murphy
Tom Molloy	PR	Perc Horne
Bill Ives	SR	Ern Wilmot
Harold Holmes	SR	Alf O'Connor
Jack Watkins	LK	Jack Lawrence
Edward Connerton	Replacement	-
Ray Norman	Coach	

A final, the second in as many seasons, was played between Eastern Suburbs and South Sydney the following Wednesday 12 September at the Sydney Cricket Ground, attracting a crowd of 15,000 people. With referee Tom McMahon officiating Eastern Suburbs prevailed winners 15-12 and claimed their first premiership since 1913.

Eastern Suburbs 15 (Tries: Caples 2, Steel. Goals: Oxford 3)

South Sydney 12 (Tries: Wearing 2. Goals: Wearing 3)

Easts kicked off in front of 15,000 spectators, Souths responded soon after with a try to Benny Wearing, the try was unconverted leaving Souths with a 3-0 lead. Easts responded with an unconverted try to Les Steel after some good lead up work from Easts captain Harry Caples. Both sides then traded penalty goals. The Tricolours took a 7-5 lead to the break following another goal to front-row forward Arthur Oxford.

After the break play flowed from end to end until, from a scrum win in Souths halfback, Johnstone, kicked over the defense, regathered, then found Wearing who scored under the posts, Wearing then converted his own try to give Souths a 10-7 lead. The lead changed yet again when Caples took an intercept, kicked past the fullback and scored, Oxford converted to make it 12-10. A penalty goal to Benny Wearing soon after locked the scores up at 12 points all. With time almost up Caples scored out wide after some fine lead up work from Easts centre, Dawson.

The win gave Eastern Suburbs their first premiership in ten years. rugby league publication 'Rugby League News' referred to the match as "the most brilliant game of the season."

— Hadden, Brad, "History of the NSWRL Finals"

== Season highlights ==
- Eastern Suburbs won the Minor and Major premierships in 1923. Giving the club its 4th title.
- Arthur Oxford was the New South Wales Rugby League's leading point scorer.
- Representatives: Harry Caples(NSW), Jack Watkins(NSW), Bill Ives(NSW).

Preceded by 1922	Season; 1923	Succeeded by 1924
