= 1923 NSWRFL season =

Rugby league competition

1923 New South Wales Rugby Football League
- Teams: 9
- Premiers: Eastern Suburbs (4th title)
- Minor premiers: Eastern Suburbs (3rd title)
- Matches played: 73
- Points scored: 1862
- Top points scorer: Arthur Oxford (113)
- Wooden spoon: University (2nd spoon)
- Top try-scorer: Herman Peters (16)

The 1923 New South Wales Rugby Football League premiership was the sixteenth season of Sydney’s top-level rugby league club competition, Australia’s first. Nine teams from across the city contested during the season which culminated in Eastern Suburbs’ victory over South Sydney in the premiership final. This season would be the last season that future Australian Rugby League Hall of Fame inductee Duncan Thompson played in, for he returned to Toowoomba after a dispute with North Sydney.

== Teams ==
- Balmain, formed on 23 January 1908 at Balmain Town Hall
- Eastern Suburbs, formed on 24 January 1908 at Paddington Town Hall
- Glebe, formed on 9 January 1908
- Newtown, formed on 14 January 1908
- North Sydney, formed at the North Sydney School of Arts in Mount Street on 7 February 1908.
- South Sydney, formed on 17 January 1908 at Redfern Town Hall
- St. George, formed on 8 November 1920 at Kogarah School of Arts
- Western Suburbs, formed on 4 February 1908
- University, formed in 1919 at Sydney University

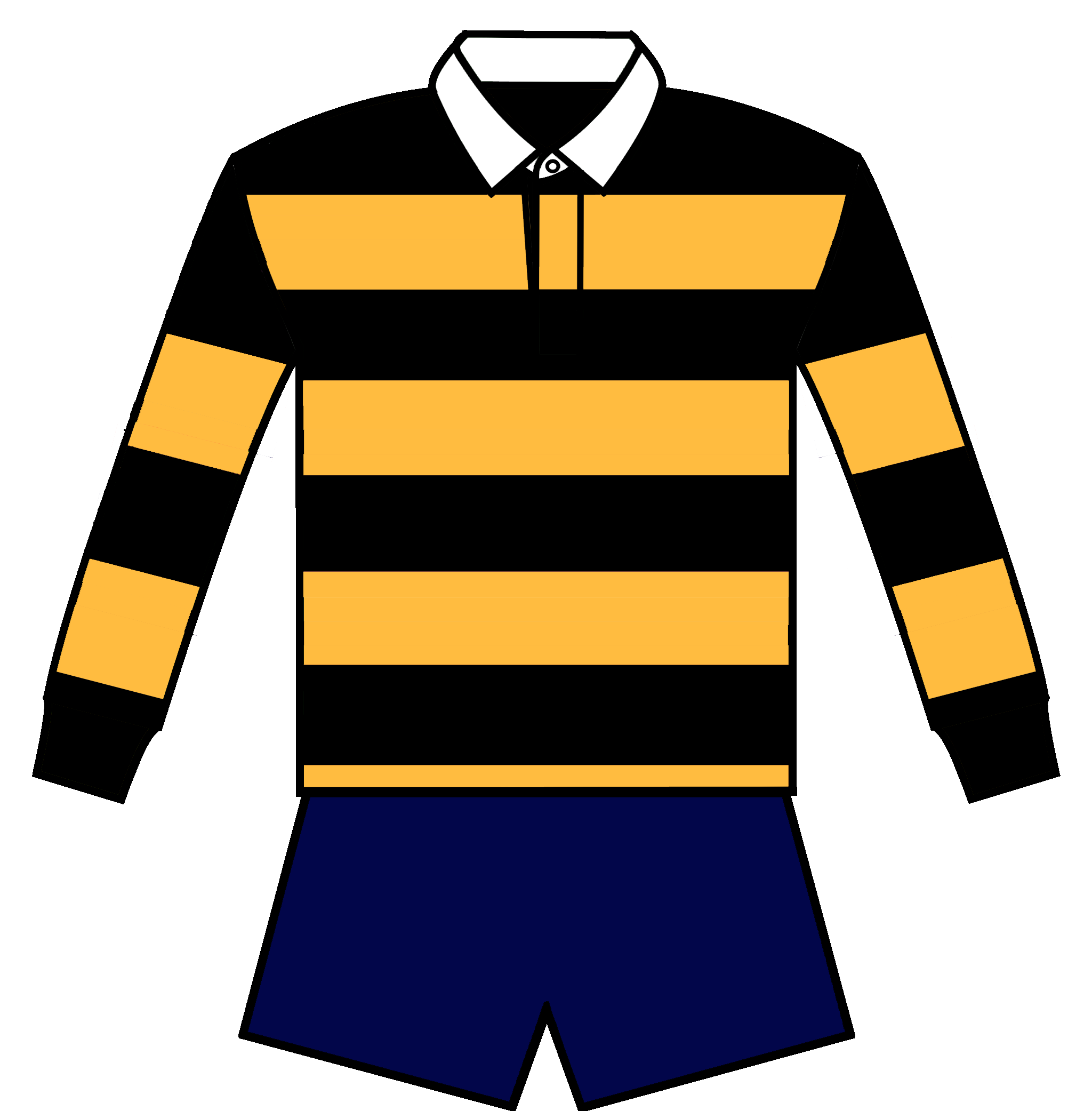
Balmain 16th season Ground: Birchgrove Oval; Captain-Coach: Charles Fraser

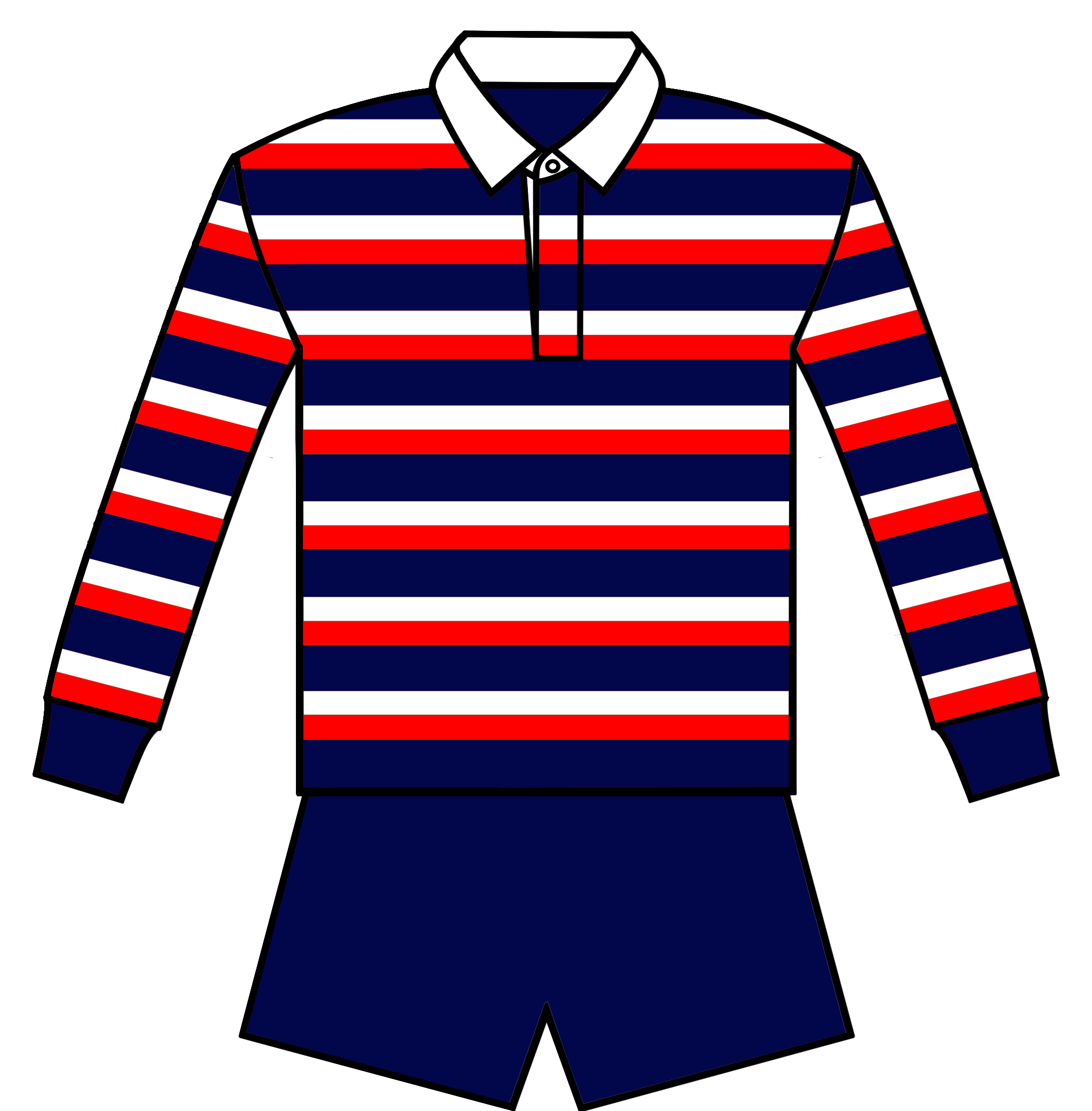
Eastern Suburbs 16th season Ground: Sydney Sports Ground; Coach: Ray Norman; Captain: Harry Caples

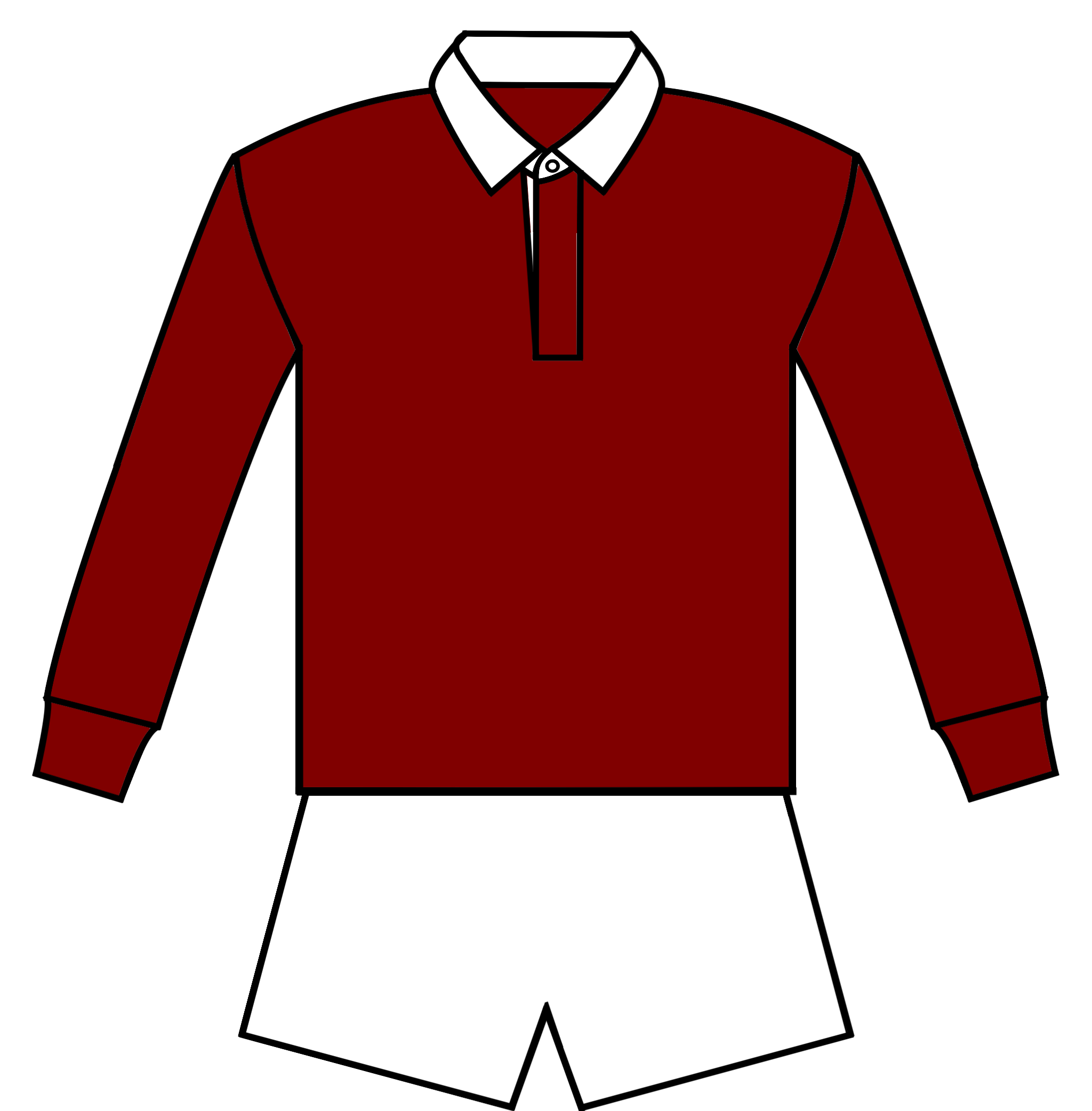
Glebe 16th season Ground: Wentworth Park; Captain-Coach: Frank Burge

Newtown 16th season Ground: Marrickville Oval; Coach: Arthur Halloway & Albert Johnston; Captain: Alex Bolewski

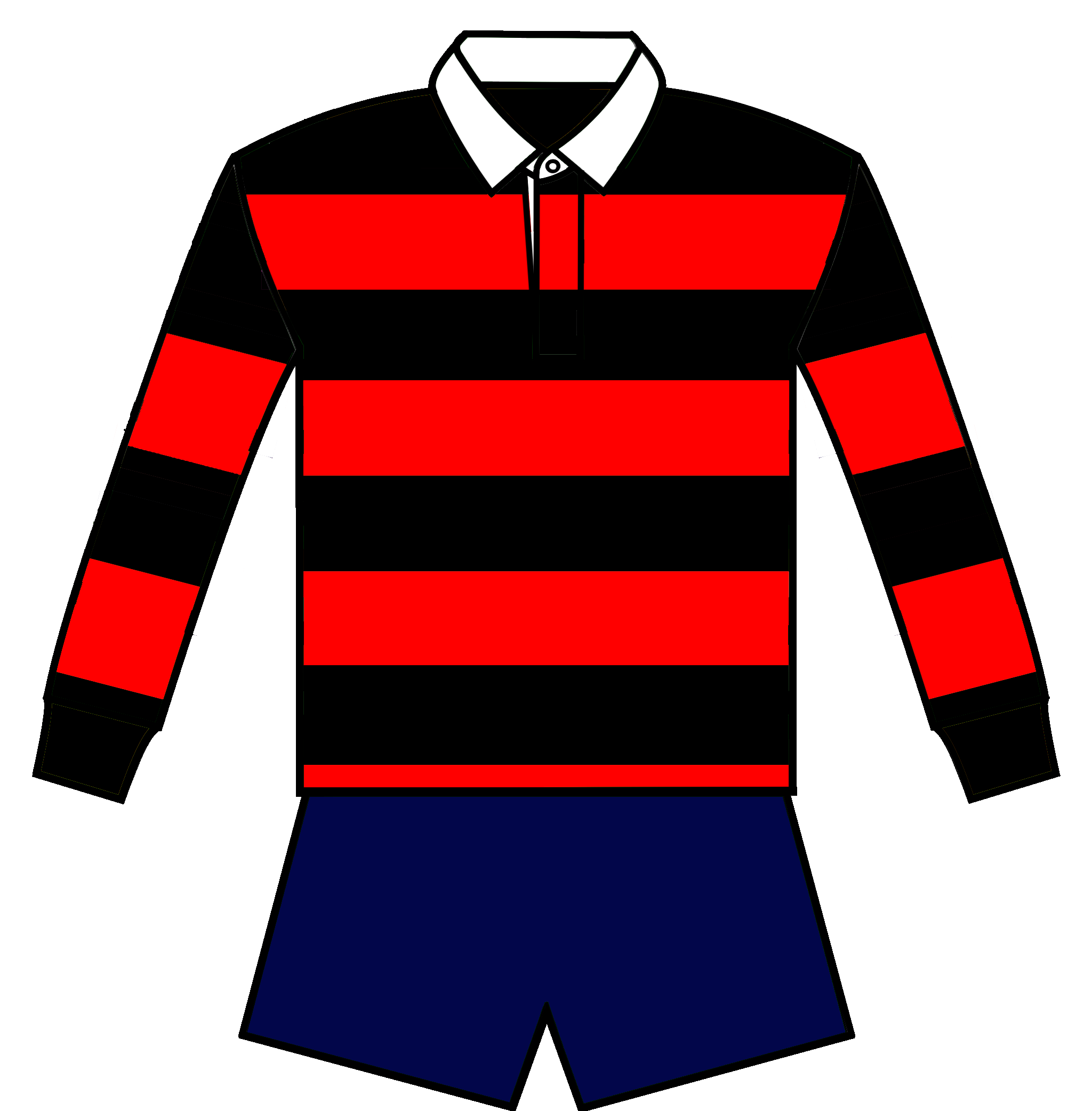
North Sydney 16th season Ground: North Sydney Oval; Coach: Captain: Duncan Thompson

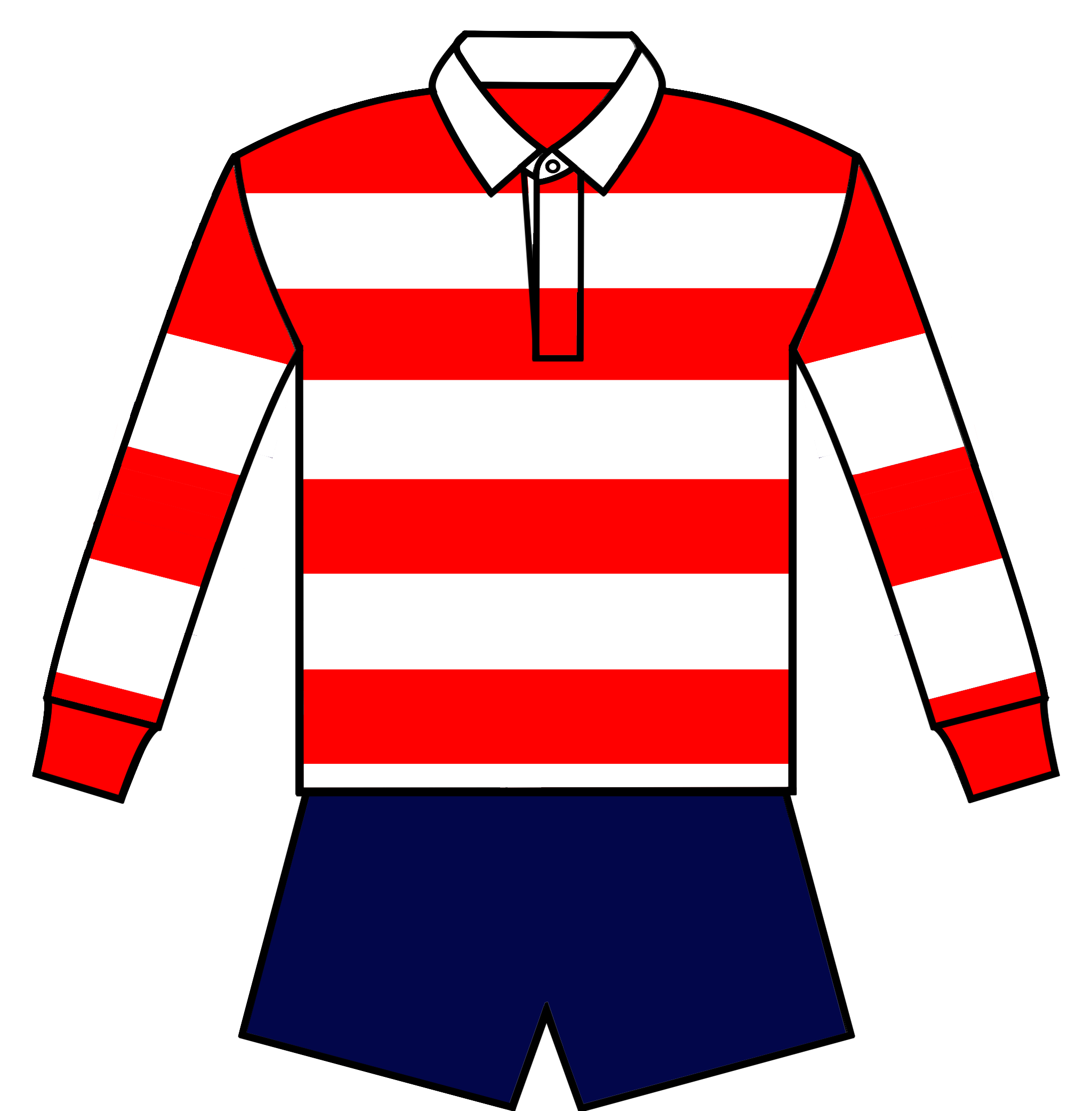
St. George 3rd season Ground: Hurstville Oval; Coach: Herb Gilbert; Captain: Clarrie Tye

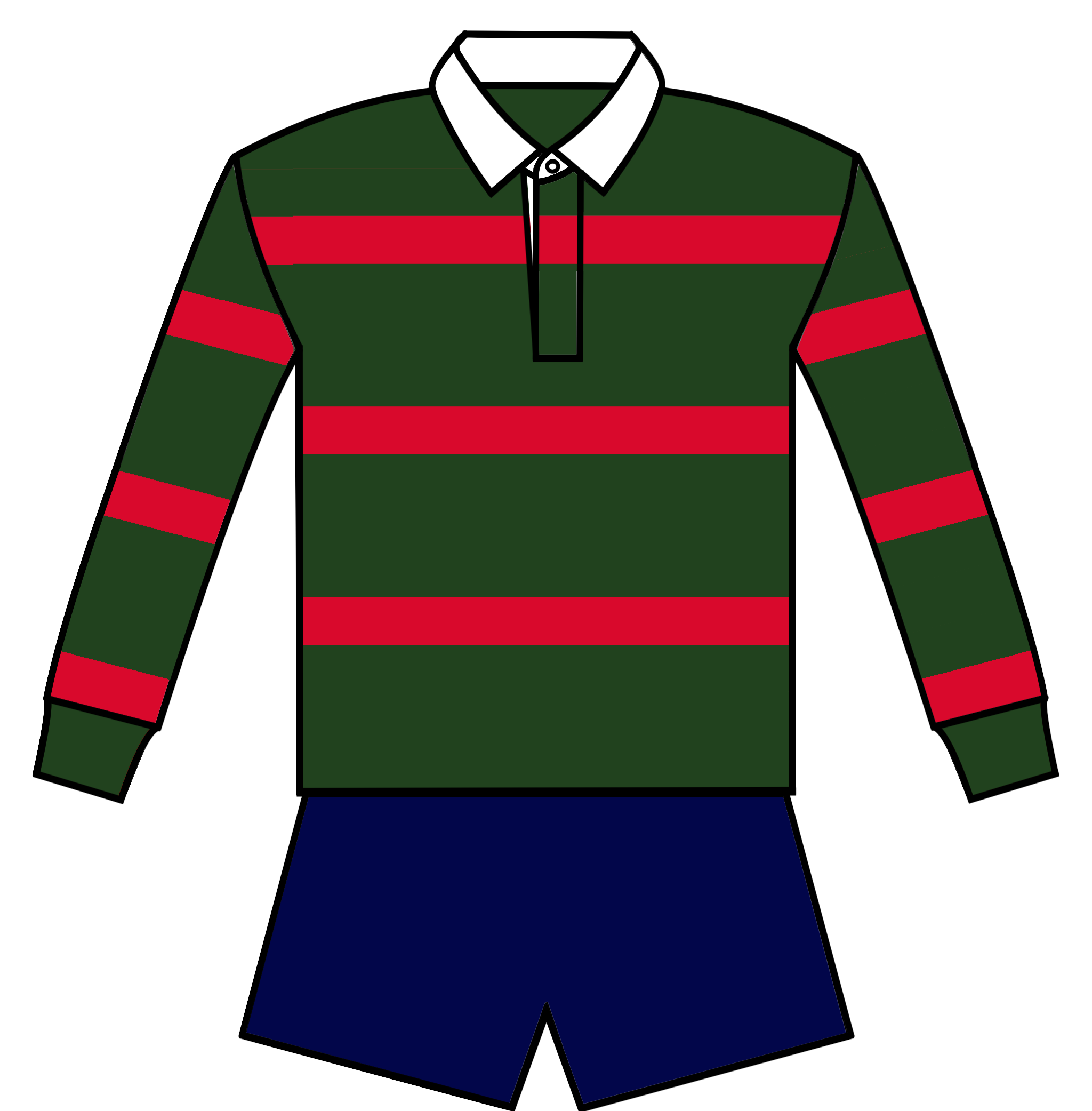
South Sydney 16th season Ground: Sydney Sports Ground; Captain-Coach: Bill Gillespie

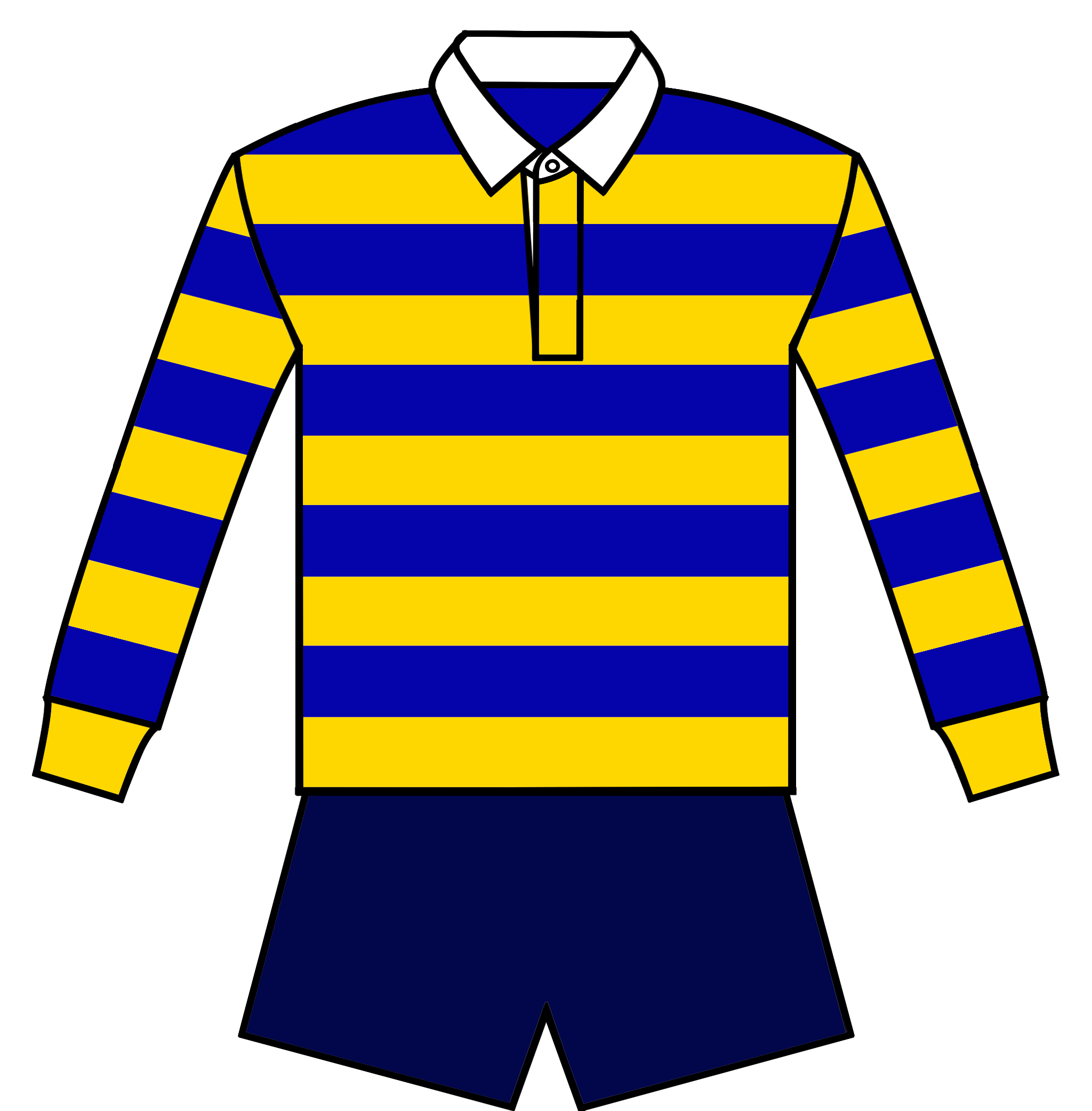
University 4th season Coach: Bill Kelly; Captain: Hubert Finn

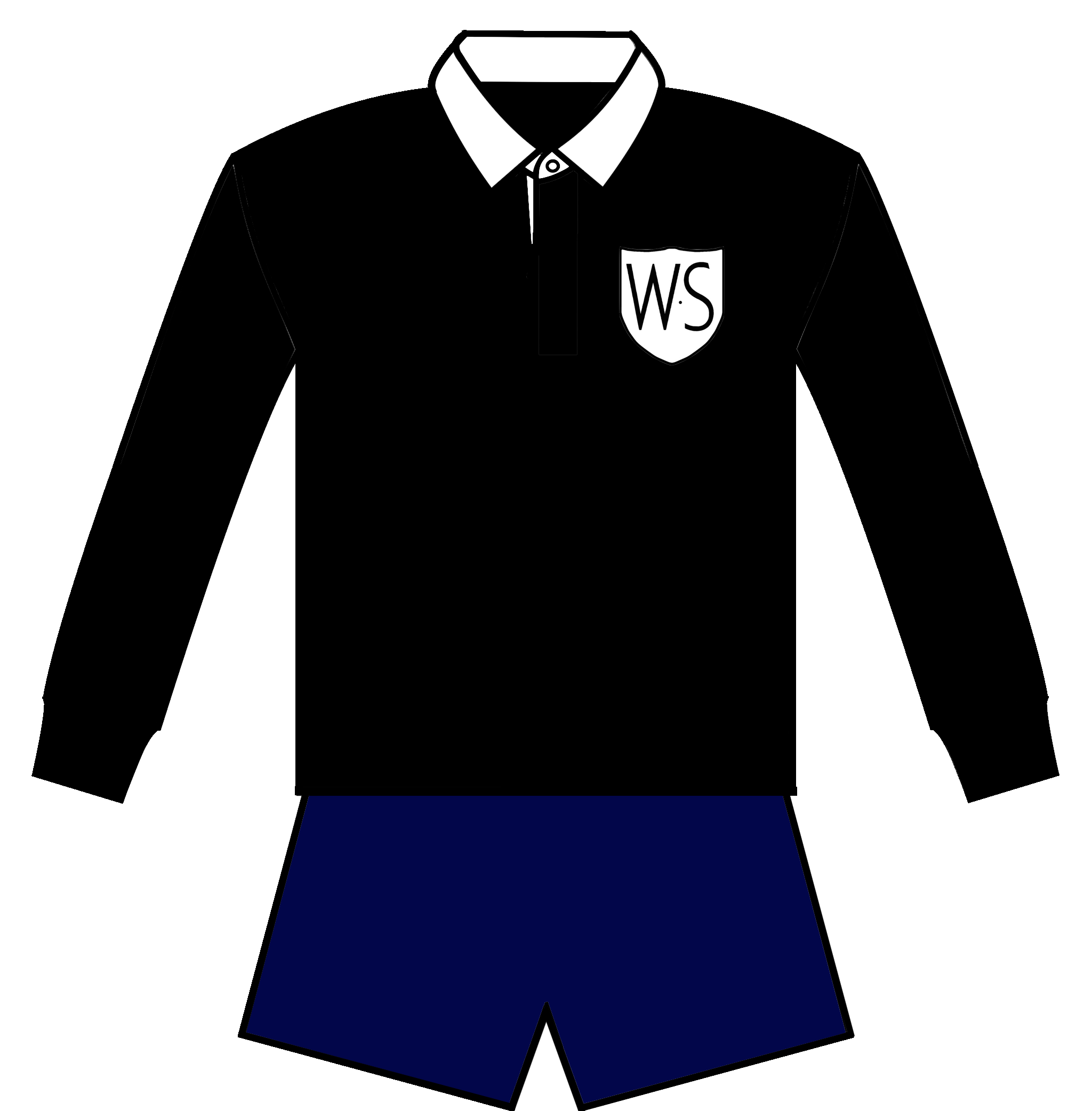
Western Suburbs 16th season Ground: Pratten Park; Captain-Coach: Tedda Courtney

=== Ladder ===
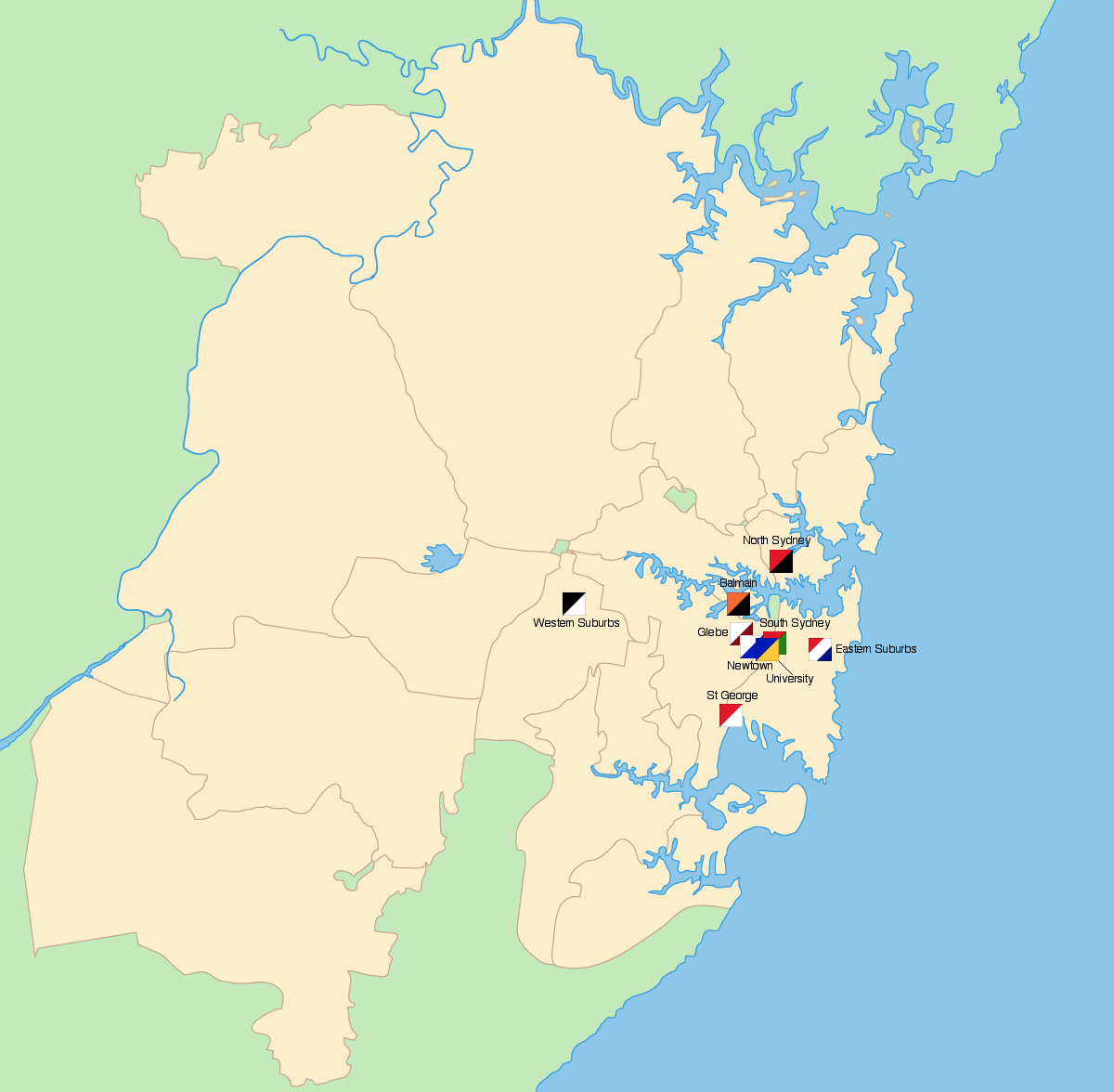
The geographical locations of the foundation teams across Sydney.

	Team	Pld	W	D	L	B	PF	PA	PD	Pts
1	Eastern Suburbs	16	13	0	3	2	235	124	+111	30
2	South Sydney	16	13	0	3	2	242	173	+69	30
3	Balmain	16	10	1	5	2	247	136	+111	25
4	Western Suburbs	16	9	0	7	2	257	218	+39	22
5	North Sydney	16	8	0	8	2	245	223	+22	20
6	Glebe	16	6	0	10	2	160	193	-33	16
7	St. George	16	5	0	11	2	168	236	-68	14
8	Newtown	16	4	2	10	2	161	297	-136	14
9	Sydney University	16	2	1	13	2	120	235	-115	9

== Finals ==
The top two sides, Eastern Suburbs and South Sydney, tied on equal points at the end of the season. Eastern Suburbs had previously been leading South Sydney by two premiership points coming into the final round of the year, only to lose to third-placed Balmain by one point in front of 14,000 people in their final match. South Sydney on the other hand won their final match against North Sydney to finish level on top of the ladder.

=== Premiership final ===
Eastern Suburbs	Position	South Sydney
13. Ed Rigney	FB	13.Howard Hallett
9.Cyril Abotomey	WG	9.Benny Wearing
10.Jack Dawson	CE	12.Tom Barry
16.Les Steel	CE	25.Vic Lawrence
26.George Agar	WG	17.Oscar Quinlivan
8.Harry Caples (c)	FE	8.Bill Gillespie (c)
7.Sid Kaufman	HB	7.Alec Johnson
5.Arthur Oxford	PR	19.David Watson
4.Bill Richards	HK	22.Pat Murphy
19.Tom Molloy	PR	24.Perce Horne
3.Bill Ives	SR	2.Ern Wilmot
20.Harold Holmes	SR	4.Alf O'Connor
6.Jack Watkins	LK	6. Jack Lawrence
28. Edward Connerton	Res.	-
Ray Norman	Coach	

A final, the second in as many seasons, was played between Eastern Suburbs and South Sydney the following Wednesday 12 September at the Sydney Cricket Ground, attracting a crowd of 15,000 people. With referee Tom McMahon officiating Eastern Suburbs prevailed winners 15–12 and claimed their first premiership since 1913.

Eastern Suburbs 15 (Tries: Caples 2, Steel. Goals: Oxford 3)

South Sydney 12 (Tries: Wearing 2. Goals: Wearing 3)

Easts kicked off in front of 15,000 spectators, Souths responded soon after with a try to Benny Wearing, the try was unconverted leaving Souths with a 3–0 lead. Easts responded with an unconverted try to Les Steel after some good lead up work from Easts captain Harry Caples. Both sides then traded penalty goals. The Tricolours took a 7–5 lead to the break following another goal to front-row forward Arthur Oxford.

After the break play flowed from end to end until, from a scrum win in Souths halfback, Johnstone, kicked over the defense, regathered, then found Wearing who scored under the posts, Wearing then converted his own try to give Souths a 10–7 lead. The lead changed yet again when Caples took an intercept, kicked past the fullback and scored, Oxford converted to make it 12–10. A penalty goal to Benny Wearing soon after locked the scores up at 12 points all. With time almost up Caples scored out wide after some fine lead up work from Easts centre, Dawson.

The win gave Eastern Suburbs their first premiership in ten years. rugby league publication Rugby League News referred to the match as "the most brilliant game of the season."

— Hadden, Brad, "History of the NSWRL Finals"
