= 1924 Eastern Suburbs season =

← 1923	1925 →

Eastern Suburbs (now known as the Sydney Roosters) competed in the 21st New South Wales Rugby League season in 1924.

== Details ==
- Home Ground:
- Lineup:-

No.

Position
Player

66 Jack 'Bluey' Watkins – SR 103 Sid Kaufman – HB 114 Ed 'Snowy' Rigney – FB 123 Harold Holmes – HK 124 Bill Ives – SR 127 Arthur Oxford – PR 129 Les Steel – WG 133 George Boddington – HK 135 Jack Dawson – CE

No.

Position
Player

136 Tom Molloy – SR 138 Cyril Abotomey – WG 141 Tom Fitzpatrick – HK 144 George Agar – WG 145 Matin Cunningham – HK 146 C. Tuckey – HK 147 Clarrie Hincksman – HK 148 T. J. Molloy – HK 149 Leo Baggott – HK 150 Andy See – HK

== Results ==
- Premiership Round 1, Saturday 3 May 1924;

Eastern Suburbs 14 defeated Newtown 13 at Sydney Sports Ground.

- Premiership Round 2, Saturday 10 May 1924;

Eastern Suburbs 28 defeated North Sydney 11 at Sydney Cricket Ground.

- Premiership Round 3, Saturday 17 May 1924;

University 15 defeated Eastern Suburbs 13 at Sydney Cricket Ground.

- Premiership Round 4, Saturday 24 May 1924 - Eastern Suburbs 15 defeated Balmain 2 at Sydney Sports Ground.

This was Balmain club's only loss in the shortened season.

- Premiership Round 5, Saturday 14 June 1924 - St George 9 defeated Eastern Suburbs 0 at Sydney Sports Ground.
- Premiership Round 6, Saturday 5 July 1924;

South Sydney 11(C. Blinkhorn, B. Wearing, O. Quinlivan Tries; Horder Goal) defeated Eastern Suburbs 3 at Sydney Sports Ground.

- Premiership Round 7, Saturday 12 July 1924

Glebe 27 defeated Eastern Suburbs 7 at Sydney Cricket Ground.

- Premiership Round 8, Eastern Suburbs - Bye
- Premiership Round 9, Saturday 26 July 1924;

Western Suburbs 18 defeated Eastern Suburbs 5 at Pratten Park.

Preceded by 1923	Season; 1924	Succeeded by 1925
