= 1922 Eastern Suburbs season =

← 1921	1923 →

Eastern Suburbs (now known as the Sydney Roosters) competed in its 15th season of New South Wales Rugby League (NSWRL) premiership in 1922, finishing the season in 3rd position.

== Details ==
- Coach: Ray Norman
- Home Ground: Agricultural Ground
- Line ups:

No.

Position
Player

66 Jack 'Bluey' Watkins – SR 67 Les Cubitt – FE 86 Harry Caples – FE 96 Gordon Wright – WG 103 Sid Kaufman – HB 99 Rex Norman – CE 110 Edward Connerton – SR 114 Ed 'Snowy' Rigney – FB 115 Fred Hume – CE 123 Harold Holmes – HK

No.

Position
Player

124 Bill Ives – SR 125 N. Bartley – SR 126 George H. Clambck – SR 127 Arthur Oxford – PR 128 Billy Ryan – SR 129 Les Steel – WG 130 Ray Lewis – SR 131 E. Little – SR 132 J. Tandy – SR 133 George Boddington – SR 134 W. Livio – SR

== Results ==
- Premiership Round 1, Saturday 29 April 1922;

Eastern Suburbs 20 defeated St George 3 at the Sydney Sports Ground.

- Premiership Round 2, Saturday 6 May 1922;

Eastern Suburbs 4 drew with Balmain 4 at Birchgrove Oval.

- Premiership Round 3, Saturday 13 May 1922

Eastern Suburbs 8 drew with South Sydney 8 at Sydney Cricket Ground.

- Premiership Round 4, Saturday 20 May 1922;

North Sydney 18 defeated Eastern Suburbs 5 at Sydney Sports Ground.

- Premiership Round 5, Eastern Suburbs had the Bye
- Premiership Round 6, Saturday 10 June 1922;

University 18 defeated Eastern Suburbs 10 at Sydney Cricket Ground.

- Premiership Round 7, Saturday 17 June 1922;

Eastern Suburbs 18 beat Newtown 10 at Sydney Sports Ground.

- Premiership Round 8, Saturday 24 June 1922.

Eastern Suburbs 6 beat Western Suburbs 2 at Pratten Park.

- Premiership Round 9, Saturday 1 July 1922.

Eastern Suburbs 21 (Kaufman 2, Ives, Holmes, Watkins tries; Oxford 3 goals) beat Glebe 5 (Ogle try; Redmond goal) at Sydney Cricket Ground.

F.Burge Kicked off for Glebe, and play was soon taken on Eastern Suburbs 25’ Caples, with a good line kick from a penalty, relieved. Murphy responded with a brilliant line kick, and after relief by Wright, strenuous forward work ensued. Glebe, however, as a result of good play by James, again got within striking distance, but Redmond missed a penalty from an easy position. Glebe were not to be denied, and a neat movement between James and Ogle ended in the latter scoring a try Redmond’s attempt at goal was a fine effort, but the ball hit the upright post and bounced infield. Glebe 3-0. Haddock was hooking in superior fashion to Little, but faulty hands by Glebe backs and determined tackling by East Sub prevented Glebe gaining much ground. A great movement, In which the ball was handled by Holmes, Steel Norman, and Ives, saw the Latter cross over for a try, which Oxford failed to convert. The scores was now 3 all. Invigorated by this success, Eastern Suburbs attacked with great vim, and but for a faulty pass by Norman Wright probably have crossed Glebes' line. Penalties were frequent, Glebe being mostly at fault. The reason appeared to be that the outside front row men would not allow the ball to be thrown into the scrum just on half time Oxford kicked a splendid goal from a free, and at the interval Eastern Sub 5 led by Glebe 3. Within a few minutes of the resumption of play, the ball was sent to Wright, who, after a fast run along the wing, centred by a cross-kick. The big and speedy Eastern Suburbs' forward, Holmes, followed on the kick and scored a try for Oxford to convert. Eastern Suburbs 10-3. It was a spectacular movement, and was appreciated by the spectators. unlike the play in the first half, the game became fast and open, and passing rushes by both sides were freely indulged in, Kaufman was showing to advantage for Eastern Suburbs, and displayed initiative in attack. He scored the next try for Eastern Suburbs through following on after a kick from Wright. No goal resulted. The scores were: Eastern Suburbs, 13-3. Eastern suburbs were again attacking within a few minutes and Watkins crossed in after Caples and Norman had made the opening. Oxford's sure foot piloted the ball over the bar. Making the scores Eastern Suburbs, 18 to 3. At last Glebe got going, and carried play into Eastern Suburbs' 25, from where Redmond landed a coal from a free. Eastern Suburbs, 18 to 5. The Glebe backs repeatedly failed to gain ground when they were In possession, the ball being merely taken across the field. Gray, who was playing centre, was an exception and frequently pleased by his straight running. Kaufman by a splendid[?] run, left the Glebe backs standing, and scored an unconverted try Eastern Suburbs 21-5. The closing stages of the game were played in a failing light. Eastern Suburbs were in the ascendance, and at the close were victors by 21 points to 5. — Sydney Morning Herald.

- Premiership Round 10, Saturday 8 July 1922.

Eastern Suburbs 12 beat St George 7 at Sydney Cricket Ground Number Two.

Premiership Round 11, Saturday 15 July 1922; Balmain 17 beat Eastern Suburbs 12 at Birchgrove Oval.

Premiership Round 12, Saturday 22 July 1922; South Sydney 18 beat Eastern Suburbs 16 at Sydney Cricket Ground.

- Premiership Round 13, Saturday 29 July 1922.

Eastern Suburbs 23 beat North Sydney 16 at Sydney Cricket Ground.

- Premiership Round 14, Saturday 5 August 1922.

Bye: Eastern Suburbs.

- Premiership Round 15, Saturday 12 August 1922.

Eastern Suburbs 16 beat University 15 at Sydney Sports Ground.

- Premiership Round 16, Saturday 19 August 1922,

Eastern Suburbs 14 beat Newtown 5 at Sydney Cricket Ground.

- Premiership Round 17, Saturday 26 August 1922.

Eastern Suburbs 20 beat Western Suburbs 10 at Pratten Park.

- Premiership Round 18, Saturday 2 September 1922;

Glebe 21 beat Eastern Suburbs 12 at Sydney Cricket Ground.

== Ladder ==
	Team	Pld	W	D	L	B	PF	PA	PD	Pts
1	North Sydney	16	12	0	4	2	306	136	+170	28
2	Glebe	16	12	0	4	2	284	154	+130	28
3	Eastern Suburbs	16	9	2	5	2	217	77	+40	24
4	South Sydney	15	9	1	5	2	207	187	+20	23
5	Balmain	16	8	2	6	2	168	145	+23	22
6	Western Suburbs	16	6	0	10	2	164	201	-37	16
7	Newtown	16	5	1	10	2	169	200	-31	15
8	University	15	5	0	10	2	148	287	-139	14
9	St George	16	2	0	14	2	140	316	-176	8

== Season's highlights ==
- Won presidents cup

Preceded by 1921	Season; 1922	Succeeded by 1923
