= 1925 Eastern Suburbs season =

← 1924	1926 →

The 1925 Eastern Suburbs DRLFC season was the eighteenth in the club's history. They competed in the New South Wales Rugby Football League's 1925 premiership and finished the season 8th out of 9 teams.

== Players ==
- Lineup:-

No.

Position
Player

124 Bill Ives – SR 129 Les Steel – WG 133 George Boddington – HK 136 Tom Molloy – SR 138 Cyril Abotomey – WG 139 Frank Egan – HB 141 Tom Fitzpatrick – HK 145 Matin Cunningham – HK 147 Clarrie Hincksman – CE 148 T. J. Molloy – FE

No.

Position
Player

151 Harry Finch – WG 152 Nelson Hardy – FB 153 H. King – PR 154 Horace 'Joe' Moxton – PR 155 James People – HK 156 N. Christie – HK 157 Hugh Byrne – CE 158 J. Lawler – HK 159 R. Booth – WG 160 H. Kavanagh – SR

== Results ==
Premiership Round 1 - Eastern Suburbs had the bye in the opening round

Premiership Round 2, Saturday 9 May 1925 - Western Suburbs 12 defeated Eastern Suburbs 5 at the Sydney Sports Ground.

The Eastern Suburbs line-up for this match was:- (fullback)Hardy, (three-quarters)Steel, Hincksman, Peoples, Finch, (Halves) Cunningham, Egan, (forwards) Fitzpatrick, Ives, King, Molloy, Moran, Boddington.

Round 3 16 May Saturday 16 May 1925 SOUTH SYDNEY 14 Defeated Eastern Suburbs EASTERN SUBURBS 0 at Sydney Cricket Ground.

Round 4 23 May Saturday 23 May 1925 Eastern Suburbs EASTERN SUBURBS 13 Defeated BALMAIN 8 at Sydney Cricket Ground.

Saturday 6 June 1925 GLEBE 13 Defeated Eastern Suburbs EASTERN SUBURBS 12 at Wentworth Park;

Round 6 13 June Saturday 13 June 1925 North Sydney Oval; Eastern Suburbs EASTERN SUBURBS 9 Defeated NEWTOWN 5 at Sydney Sports Ground;

Round 7 20 June Saturday 20 June 1925; ST GEORGE 5 Defeated Eastern Suburbs EASTERN SUBURBS 0 at Earl Park

Round 8 27 June Saturday 27 June 1925 NORTH SYDNEY 4 Defeated EASTERN SUBURBS 3 at North Sydney Oval.

3 August 1925; Glebe 16 (McGrath, Goddard, Gray tries, Quigley 2 goals) beat Eastern Suburbs 10 (Moxon, Steel tries, Ives, Steel goals) at the Sydney Sports Ground.

Eastern Suburbs attacked throughout the first half, and at the interval led by 8 points to 2. Hincksman and T. J. Molloy were the outstanding players for Eastern Suburbs in the first half, and the side was superior to Glebe. Scrummaging honours were slightly in favour of Eastern Suburbs, although Glebe early held the advantage. Rarely was the ball carried to Eastern Suburbs' territory, and despite good efforts by [Glebe players] See and Larken Glebe were unable to score more than a penalty goal by Quigley. A good try by Moxun after forward work was followed by a neat try by Steel, after Hincksman made the opening.

After the interval Glebe quickly attacked. With surprising speed the Glebe forwards advanced time and again and there back division with McMahon, Ricketts and See prominent, helped to keep Eastern Suburbs constantly defending. With one or two brief periods, play in this half was mostly In Eastern Suburbs' area. Hardy at full-back was called on for much defensive work and frequently Indulged In kicking duels with Cummins. McGrath was not long in crossing the line for Glebe. Soon after Quigley ran nicely along the wing and with a well judged kick centred tho ball. Goddard, who played a neat game throughout, gathered and scored a good try, which made tho scores 8 all. Eastern Suburbs gained a temporary lead of 10-8 through Steel kicking a penaltv goal, but Goddard was not long in scoring again, and Glebe now led 11-10. A foolish pass by Ives behind his goal line was snapped up by Gray, who touched down for try. Towards the end Eastern Suburbs tried hard to score, but combined movements by their backs where frustrated by the Glebe defence, and before full-time Quigley added another goal, making tho final scores, Glebe 16 Eastern Suburbs 10.

== Ladder ==
	Team	Pld	W	D	L	B	PF	PA	PD	Pts
1	South Sydney	12	12	0	0	1	190	87	+103	26
2	Western Suburbs	11	6	0	5	2	166	150	+16	16
3	Balmain	12	6	1	5	1	130	112	+21	15
4	North Sydney	12	6	1	5	1	87	138	+19	15
5	St. George	11	5	1	5	2	94	141	-9	15
6	Glebe	12	5	0	7	1	107	171	-53	12
7	University	11	3	1	7	2	168	142	-24	11
8	Eastern Suburbs	12	4	0	8	1	161	120	-31	10
9	Newtown	11	3	0	8	2	120	136	-42	10

Eastern Suburbs and Newtown both finished the season with the same number of points but Newtown were awarded the 'Wooden Spoon' due to there inferior points differential.

== See also ==
Preceded by 1924	Season; 1925	Succeeded by 1926
