= 1925 NSWRFL season =

Rugby league competition

1925 New South Wales Rugby Football League
- Teams: 9
- Premiers: South Sydney (5th title)
- Minor premiers: South Sydney (5th title)
- Matches played: 52
- Points scored: 1197
- Top points scorer(s): Benny Wearing (80)
- Wooden spoon: Newtown (2nd spoon)
- Top try-scorer(s): Benny Wearing (12)

The 1925 New South Wales Rugby Football League premiership was the eighteenth season of Sydney’s top-level rugby league club competition, Australia’s first. Nine teams from across the city contested during the season, with South Sydney being crowned premiers by finishing on top of the League.

== Season summary ==
For this season the St George Dragons found a permanent homeground at Earl Park, Arncliffe. The NSWRFL introduced reserve footballs, so that a game could continue even if the ball had been booted out of the stadium.

South Sydney won all their twelve matches during the season, and remain the only club to achieve this in the history of the competition and just one of five to go through a season undefeated. The Rabbitohs made a clean sweep of all three grades.

It was the first of seven premierships South Sydney would win in eight years through to 1932. There were no finals played. By Round 13 South Sydney was in such a dominant position (10 points ahead with five rounds to play) that the NSWRFL curtailed the competition and proceeded to the City Cup knockout tournament, which Souths also won.

== Teams ==
- Balmain, formed on January 23, 1908, at Balmain Town Hall
- Eastern Suburbs, formed on January 24, 1908, at Paddington Town Hall
- Glebe, formed on January 9, 1908
- Newtown, formed on January 14, 1908
- North Sydney, formed on February 7, 1908
- South Sydney, formed on January 17, 1908, at Redfern Town Hall
- St. George, formed on November 8, 1920, at Kogarah School of Arts
- Western Suburbs, formed on February 4, 1908
- University, formed in 1919 at Sydney University

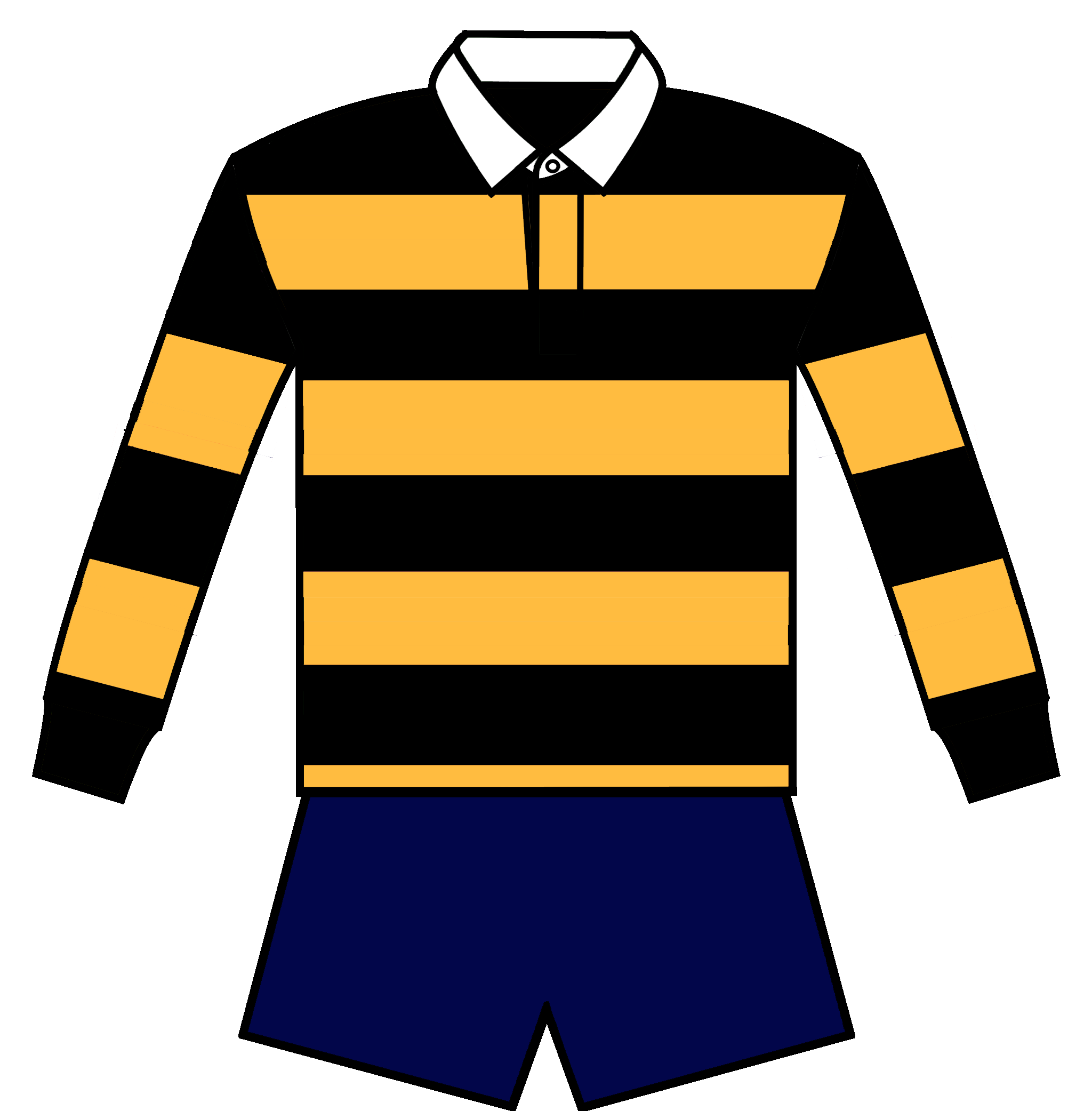
Balmain 18th season Ground: Birchgrove Oval; Coach: Alf Fraser; Captain: Charles Fraser

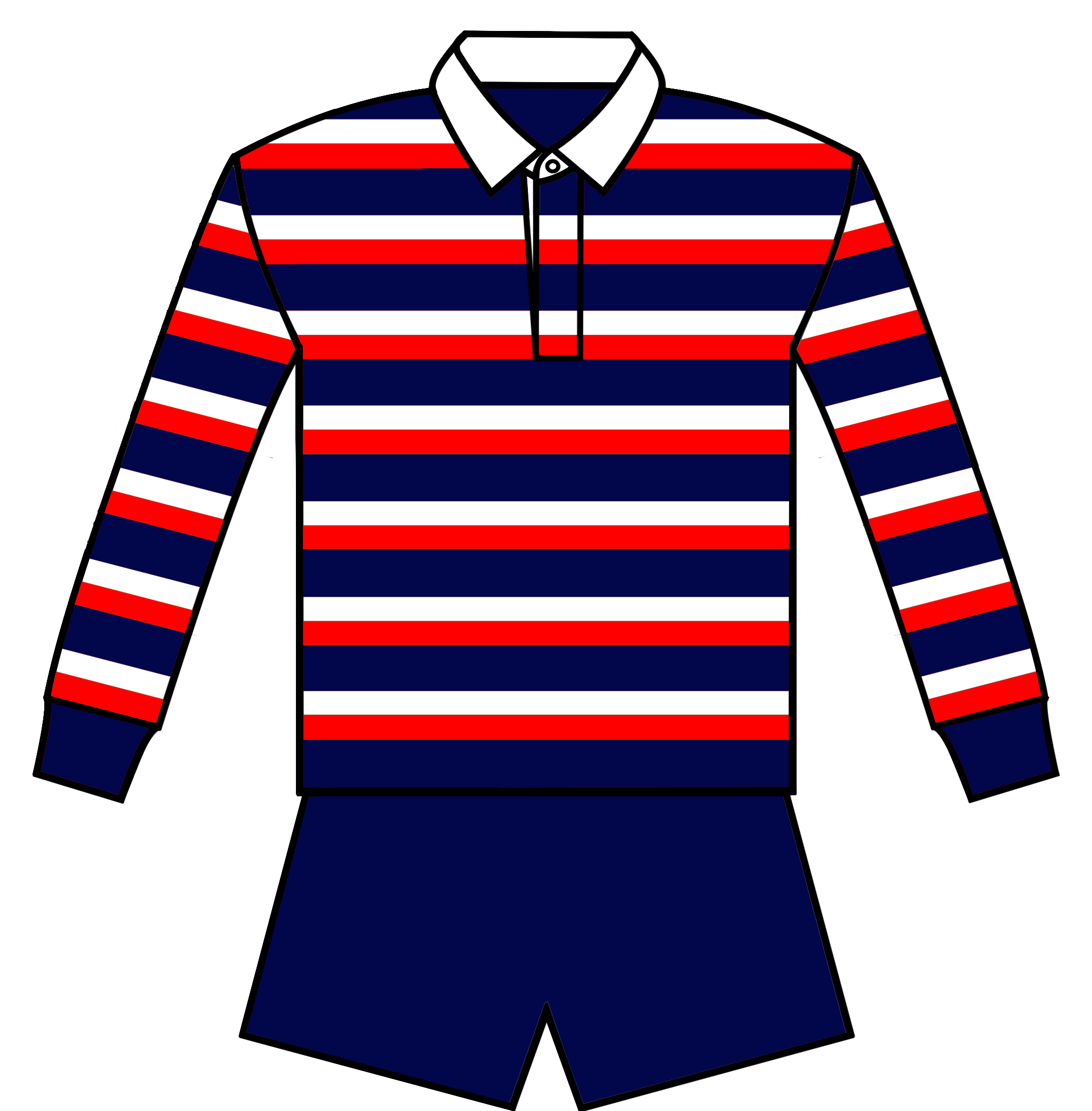
Eastern Suburbs 18th season Ground: Sydney Sports Ground; Captain: Bill Ives

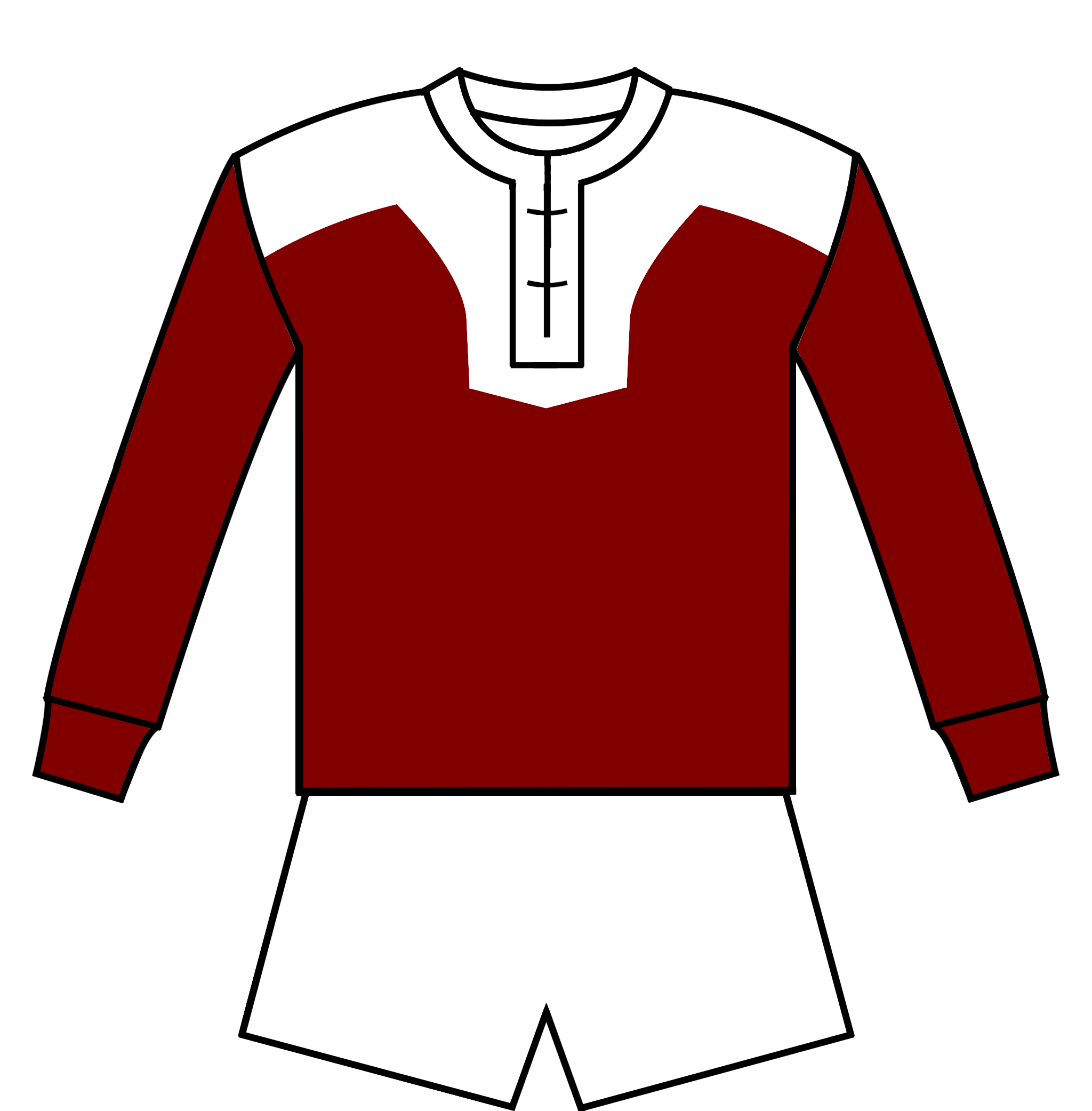
Glebe 18th season Ground: Wentworth Oval; Captain: Bert Gray

Newtown 18th season Ground: Marrickville Oval; Coach: Albert Johnston; Captain: Perce Horne

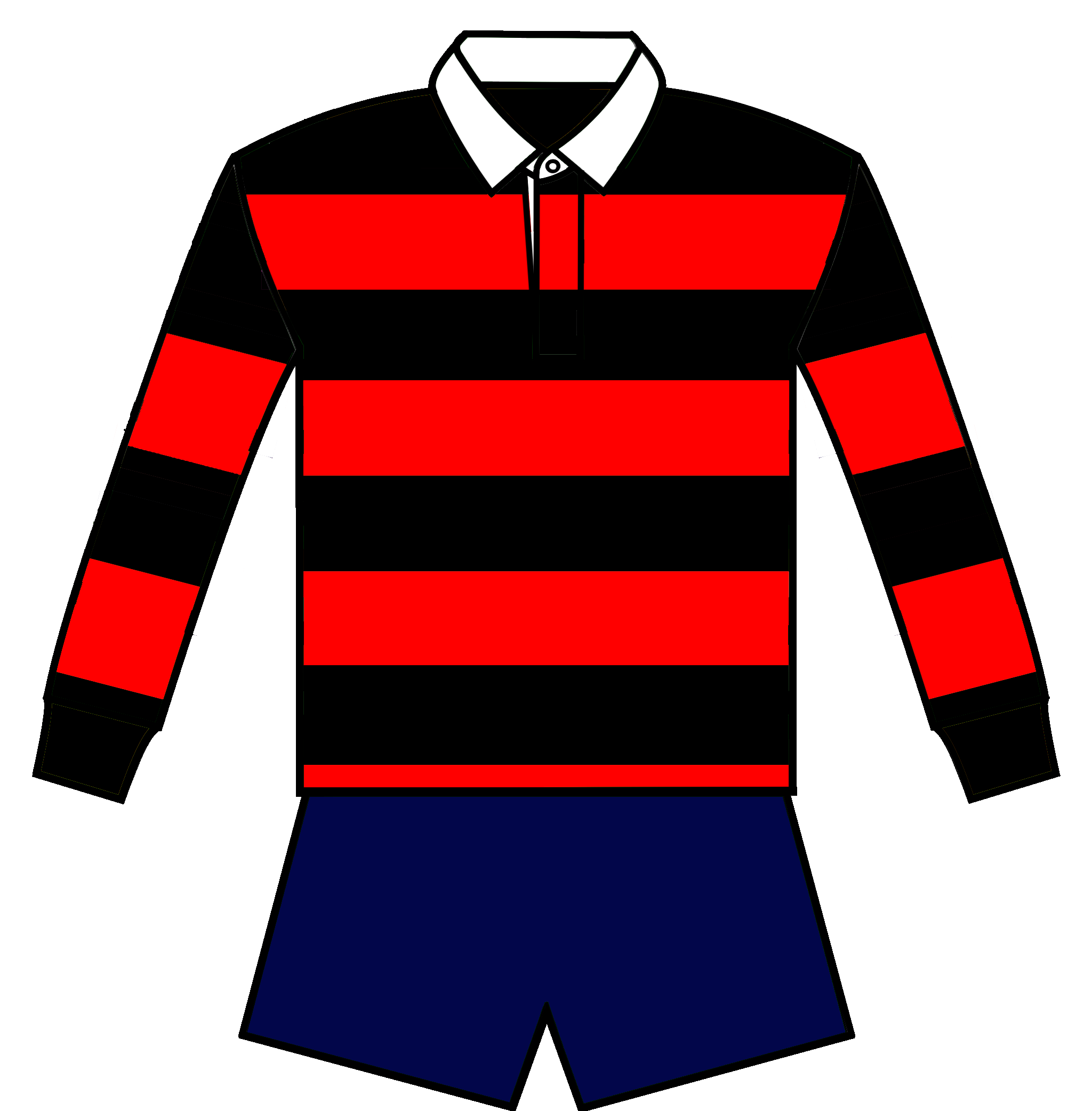
North Sydney 18th season Ground: North Sydney Oval; Coach: Jim Devereux; Captain: Herman Peters

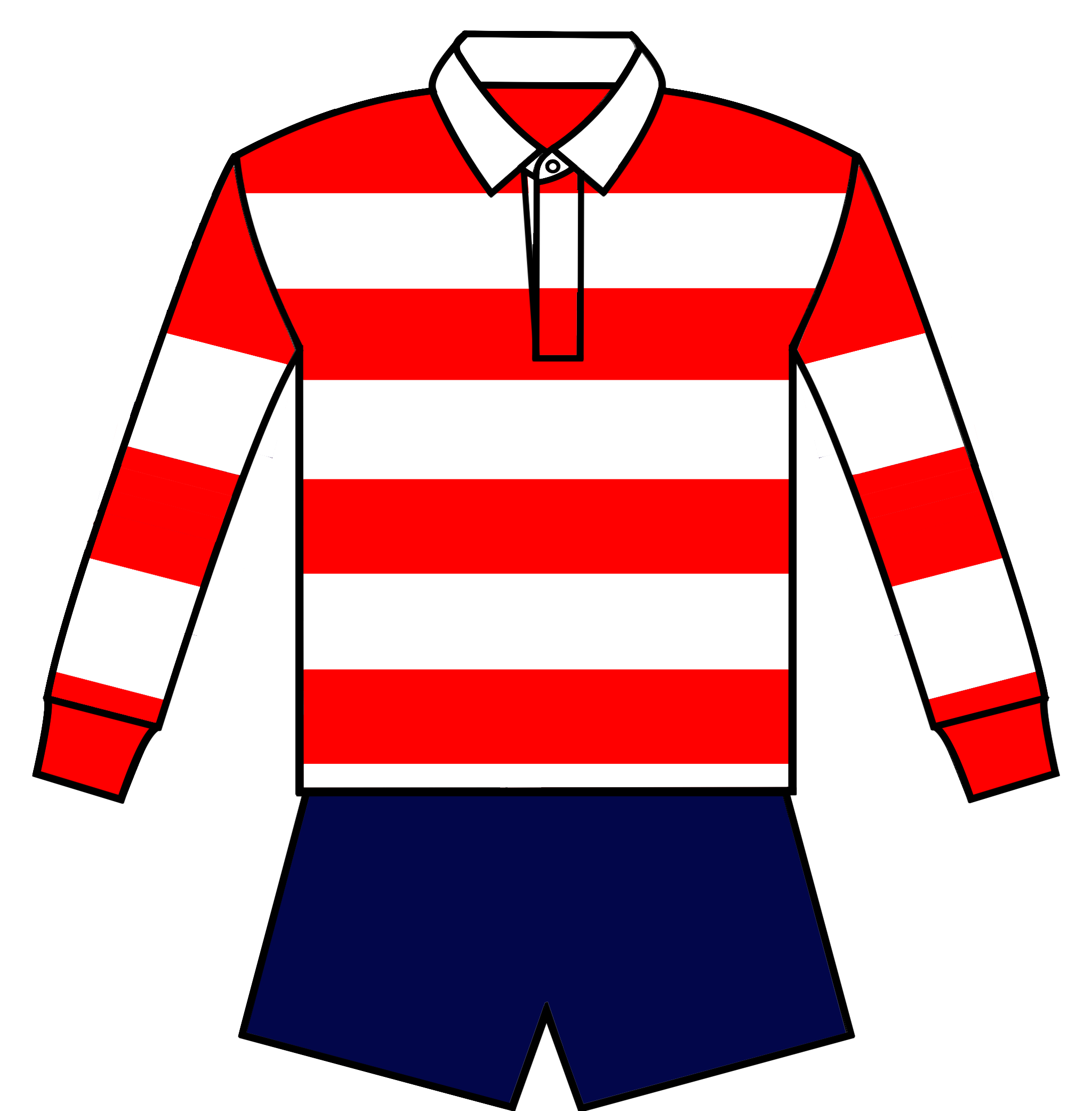
St. George 5th season Ground: Earl Park; Coach: Herb Gilbert; Captain: Arnold Traynor

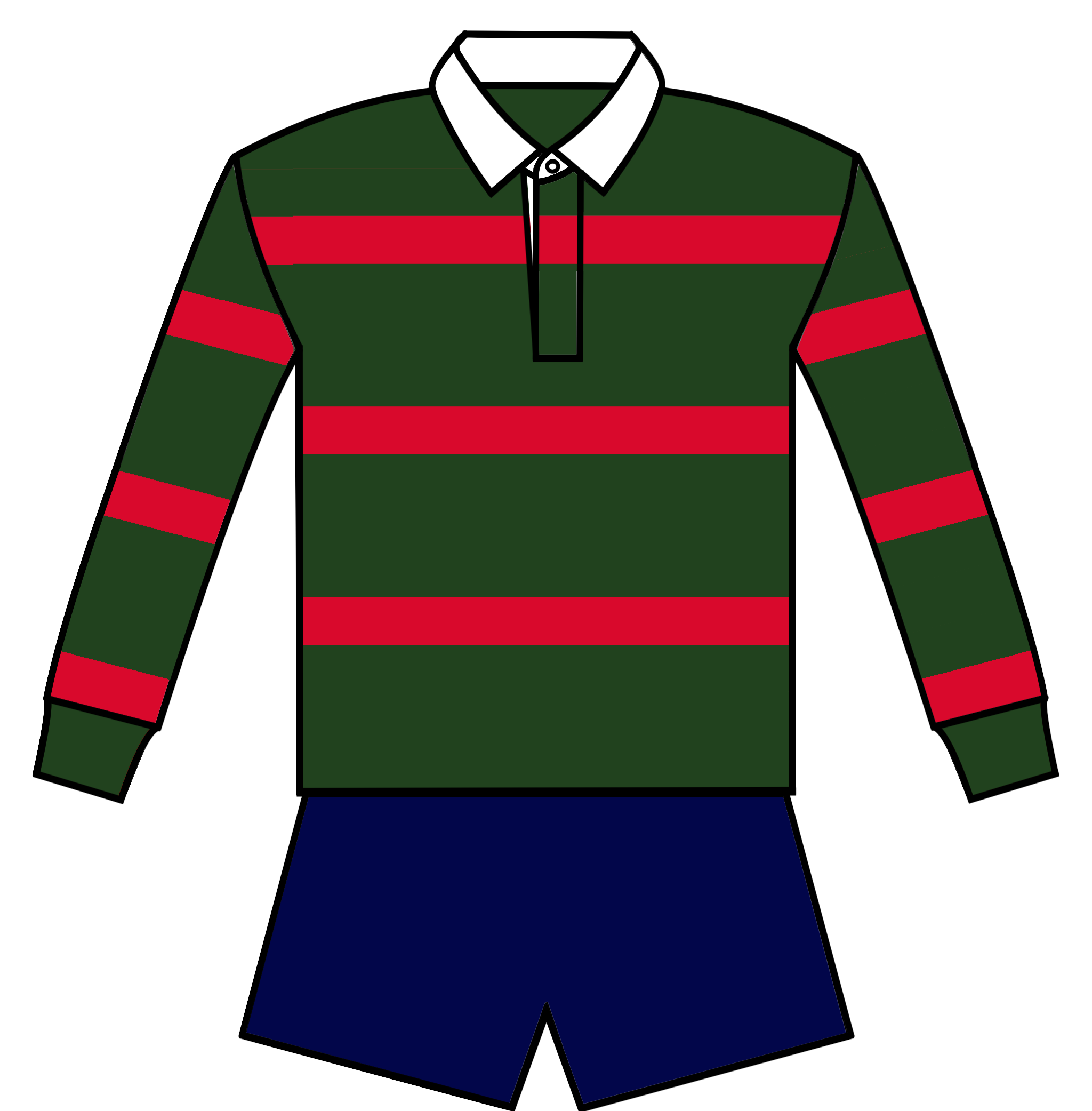
South Sydney 18th season Ground: Royal Agricultural Society Ground & Sydney Sports Ground; Coach: Howard Hallett; Captain: Alf Blair, Jack Lawrence

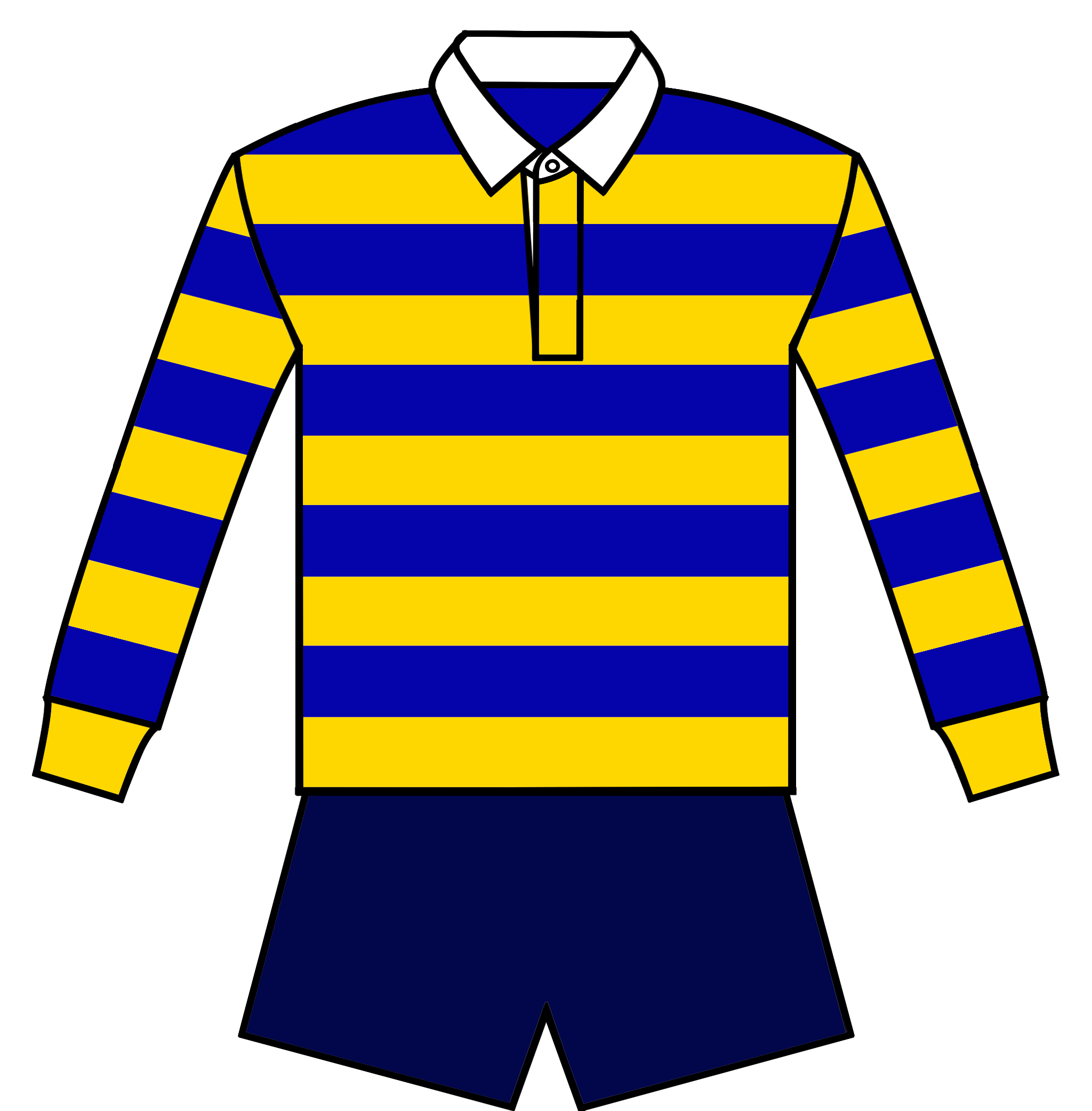
University 6th season Captains: Hubert Finn, Frank O'Rourke

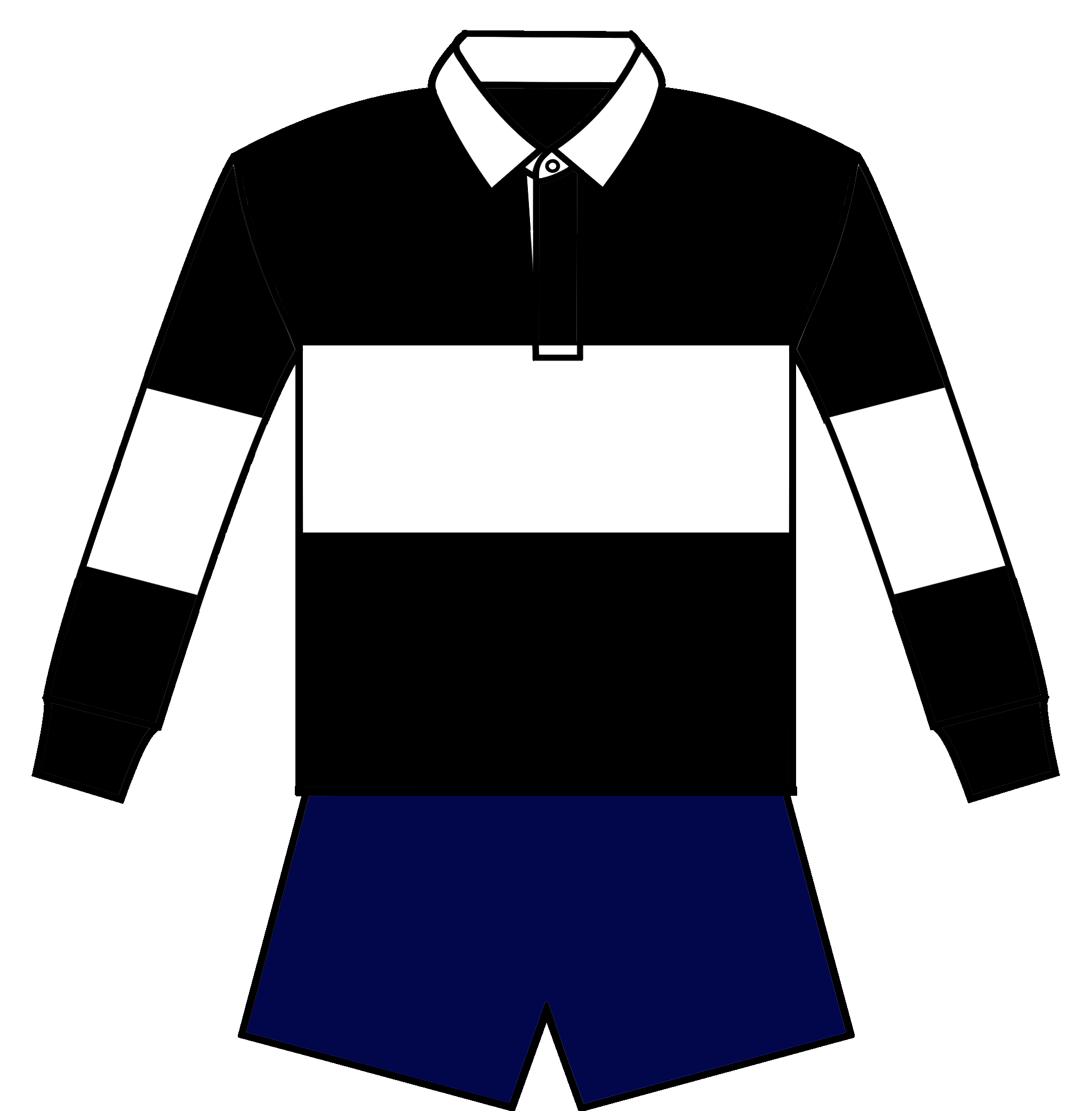
Western Suburbs 18th season Ground: Pratten Park; Captain: Gordon Stettler

== Ladder ==
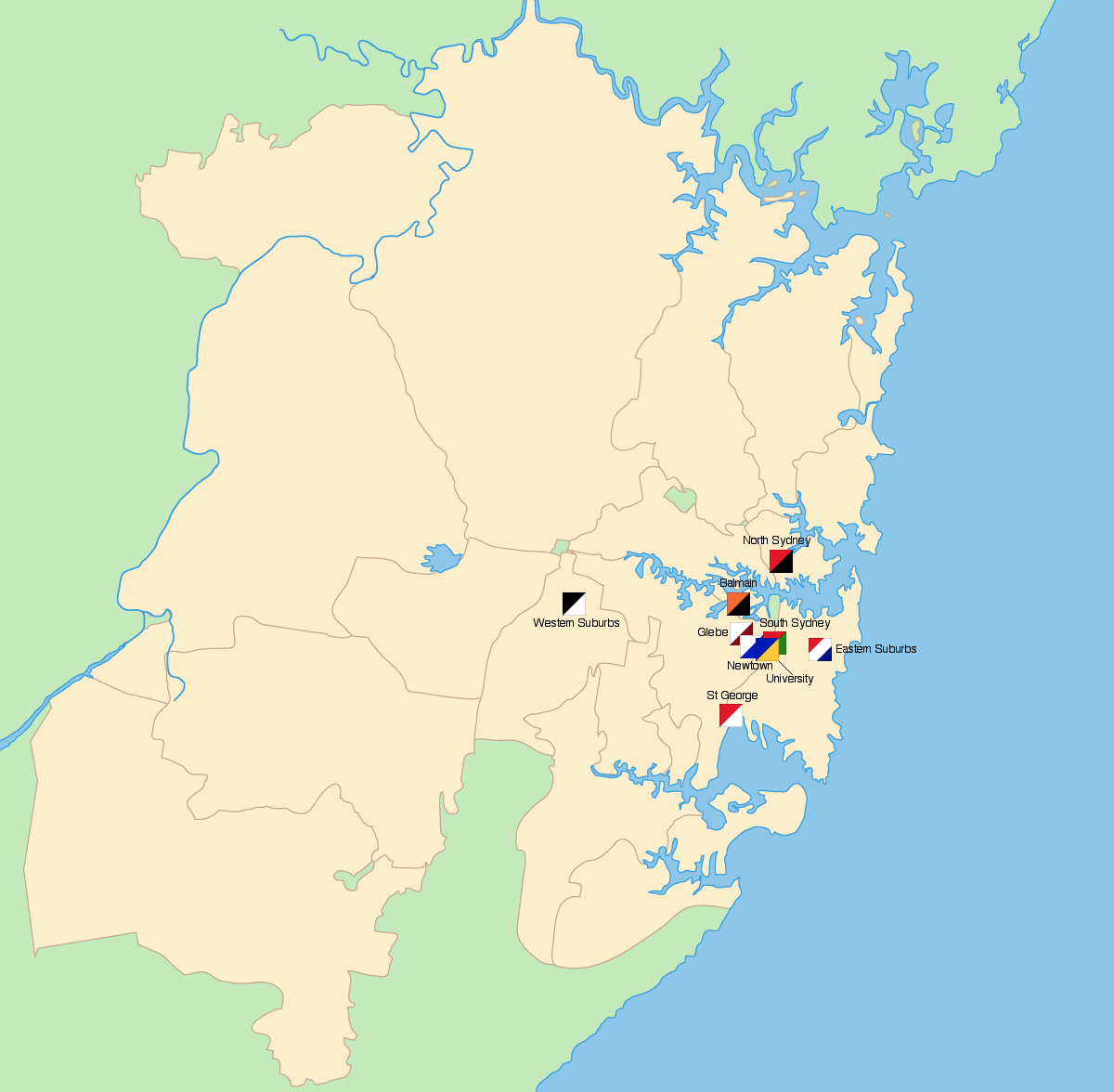
The geographical locations of the teams that contested the 1925 premiership across Sydney.

	Team	Pld	W	D	L	B	PF	PA	PD	Pts
1	South Sydney	12	12	0	0	1	190	87	+103	26
2	Western Suburbs	11	6	0	5	2	166	150	+16	16
3	Balmain	12	6	1	5	1	133	112	+21	15
4	North Sydney	12	6	1	5	1	157	138	+19	15
5	St. George	11	5	1	5	2	132	141	-9	15
6	Glebe	12	5	0	7	1	118	171	-53	12
7	Sydney University	11	3	1	7	2	118	142	-24	11
8	Eastern Suburbs	12	4	0	8	1	89	120	-31	10
9	Newtown	11	3	0	8	2	94	136	-42	10
