= Vic Lawrence =

Vic Lawrence may refer to:

- Vic Lawrence (Australian rules footballer), Australian rules footballer for North Melbourne
- Vic Lawrence (rugby league), Australian rugby league player for the South Sydney Rabbitohs
