= 1925 South Sydney season =

Australian rugby league club season

The 1925 South Sydney DRLFC season was the 18th in the club's history. They competed in the New South Wales Rugby Football League's 1925 Premiership, completing what's been described as the greatest season in South Sydney's history. During the year, the Rabbitohs won the first grade premiership, the City Cup knockout tournament, and the reserve grade and third grade premierships.

Coached by Howard Hallett and captained by Alf Blair, Souths' first grade side went through the premiership competition undefeated, winning all 12 games and leaving a 10-point gap between first and second. This was to be the first of five consecutive premierships won by the club.

Souths' winger Benny Wearing was the premiership's top try scorer (12) and top point scorer (80).

Results:

Round 1: Saturday, 2 May - Souths 16 def Balmain 10
Round 2: Saturday, 9 May - Souths 13 def University 0
Round 3: Saturday, 16 May - Souths 14 def Eastern Suburbs 0
Round 4: Saturday, 23 May - St George 10 lost to Souths 11
Round 5: Saturday, 6 June - Newtown 12 lost to Souths 14
Round 6: Saturday, 13 June - Souths 31 def Glebe 8
Round 7: Bye
Round 8: Saturday, 27 June - Souths 23 def Western Suburbs 20
Round 9: Saturday, 4 July - Souths 15 def North Sydney 10
Round 10: Saturday, 18 July - Souths 8 def University 2
Round 11: Saturday, 25 July - Souths 12 def Glebe 2
Round 12: Saturday, 1 August - Souths 25 def St George 8
Round 13: Saturday, 8 August - Souths 8 def Eastern Suburbs 5

Ladder:

	Team	Pld	W	D	L	B	PF	PA	PD	Pts
1	South Sydney	12	12	0	0	1	190	87	+103	26
2	Western Suburbs	11	6	0	5	2	166	150	+16	16
3	Balmain	12	6	1	5	1	130	112	+21	15
4	North Sydney	12	6	1	5	1	157	138	+19	15
5	St. George	11	5	1	5	2	132	141	-9	15
6	Glebe	12	5	0	7	1	107	171	-53	12
7	University	11	3	1	7	2	168	142	-24	11
8	Eastern Suburbs	12	4	0	8	1	161	120	-31	10
9	Newtown	11	3	0	8	2	120	136	-42	10

As a result of Souths' dominance, the League introduced a finals series for the following season in order to maintain interest in the competition.
