= Len Holmes =

Australian rugby league footballer

Personal information
- Full name: Leonard Holmes
- Born: 1924
- Died: 15 November 1959 (aged 34–35)

Playing information
- Position: Second-row, Lock
Club
| Years | Team | Pld | T | G | FG | P |
|---|---|---|---|---|---|---|
| 1945–53 | Canterbury-Bankstown | 100 | 20 | 48 | 0 | 156 |
Representative
| Years | Team | Pld | T | G | FG | P |
| 1947 | New South Wales | 4 | 1 | 3 | 0 | 9 |
| 1947–48 | NSW City | 2 | 0 | 2 | 0 | 4 |
- Source: As of 20 February 2019
- Father: Harold Holmes

Len Holmes was an Australian professional rugby league footballer who played for the Canterbury-Bankstown in the 1940s and 1950s. and for the New South Wales Rugby League team in the 1940s.

== Playing career ==
Holmes made his first grade debut for Canterbury-Bankstown in 1945. In 1947, Holmes played in the club's grand final loss against Balmain. Holmes played with the club up until the end of 1953 before retiring.

Holmes also represented New South Wales and New South Wales City in 1947 and 1948.

Holmes was the son of former premiership winning player Harold Holmes who played for Eastern Suburbs, South Sydney and Western Suburbs.
