= Clarrie Ives =

Australia rugby league footballer (1890–1956)

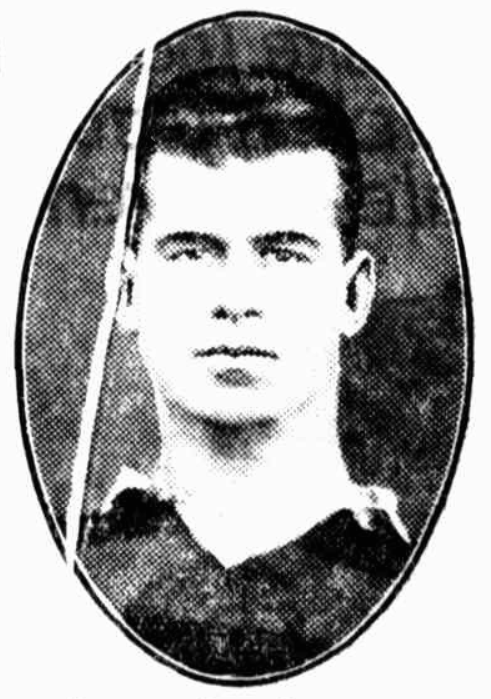

Personal information
- Full name: Jonathon Clarence Ives
- Born: 26 April 1890 Glebe, New South Wales, Australia
- Died: 25 February 1956 (aged 65) Artarmon, New South Wales, Australia

Playing information
- Position: Hooker, Second-row
Club
Years	Team	Pld	T	G	FG	P
1920–24	North Sydney	56	14	6	0	54
Representative
Years	Team	Pld	T	G	FG	P
1924	Australia	1	0	0	0	0
1920–24	New South Wales	10	3	0	0	9
1920–23	Metropolis	5	1	0	0	3
- Relatives: Bill Ives (brother)

J.C. 'Clarrie' Ives (1890 – 25 February 1956) was an Australian rugby league footballer who played for the North Sydney club in the NSWRFL.

== Playing career ==
A tough prop-forward, Ives started his first grade career with North Sydney as a 30-year-old in 1920 and was a member of the club's golden era of the early 1920s.

Ives won two premierships with North Sydney in 1921 & 1922, and was club captain in his final season in 1924. Ives played at second-row in North Sydney's 1922 NSWRL grand final victory over Glebe at the Sydney Cricket Ground in which Norths won 35–3.

He also played for New South Wales on ten occasions and Australia. He played in one test match for Australia in the second test against Great Britain during the 1924 Ashes series. He is listed on the Australian Players Register as Kangaroo No. 119.

His position of choice was at prop-forward and his younger brother Bill Ives was also a professional rugby league footballer. He was selected to go on the 1921–22 Kangaroo tour of Great Britain and played in 6 tour games but no tests. He retired in 1925, aged 35.

== Death ==
Ives died at Artarmon, New South Wales on 25 February 1956, aged 66.
