= Tom Fitzpatrick (rugby league) =

Australian rugby league footballer

Personal information
- Full name: Thomas Fitzpatrick

Playing information
- Position: Second-row, Prop
Club
Years	Team	Pld	T	G	FG	P
1924–30	Eastern Suburbs	75	24	0	0	72
- Source: As of 4 May 2020

Tom Fitzpatrick (birth unknown – death unknown) was an Australian rugby league footballer who played 75 games and scored 24 tries for Eastern Suburbs between 1924 and 1930.
