= Alec Johnson (rugby league) =

Australian rugby league player

Personal information
- Full name: Alexander Johnson
- Born: 1901 Sydney, New South Wales, Australia

Playing information
- Position: Halfback, Five-eighth
Club
Years	Team	Pld	T	G	FG	P
1922–25	South Sydney	32	6	0	0	18
Representative
Years	Team	Pld	T	G	FG	P
1923	Metropolis	1	0	0	0	0

Alec Johnson also known as "Alexander Johnston" was an Australian rugby league footballer who played in the 1920s. He played for South Sydney in the New South Wales Rugby League (NSWRL) competition.

== Playing career ==
Johnson made his first grade debut for Souths against Western Suburbs in Round 1 1922 at Pratten Park scoring a try in a 20-12 win.

In 1923, Souths reached the grand final against Eastern Suburbs. Johnson played at halfback in the 15-12 defeat which was played at the Sydney Cricket Ground.

In 1924, Souths again reached the grand final against rivals Balmain. Souths lost 3-0 which was the lowest scoring grand final at the time. Johnson only played 2 games in 1924, spending half the second half of the season playing for Gundagai in the New South Wales country competition.

In 1925, Johnson was part of the South Sydney side which went the entire season undefeated and won the premiership outright without needing to play in a grand final.

Overall, Johnson made a total of 52 appearances for Souths across all grades.
