= Clarrie Tye =

Australian rugby league player

- Clarrie Tye. St.George, 1927

Personal information
- Full name: Clarence Frederick Tye
- Born: 12 December 1892 St Peters, New South Wales, Australia
- Died: 27 November 1936 (aged 43) Peakhurst, New South Wales, Australia

Playing information
- Position: Lock, Hooker, Second-row
Club
| Years | Team | Pld | T | G | FG | P |
|---|---|---|---|---|---|---|
| 1914–20 | Western Suburbs | 58 | 7 | 0 | 0 | 21 |
| 1921–27 | St. George | 81 | 11 | 0 | 0 | 33 |
| | Total | 139 | 18 | 0 | 0 | 54 |
Representative
| Years | Team | Pld | T | G | FG | P |
| 1919–22 | New South Wales | 7 | 0 | 0 | 0 | 0 |
| 1923 | Metropolis | 2 | 2 | 0 | 0 | 6 |

Clarence Frederick "Clarrie" Tye (1892–1936) was an Australian rugby league player who played in the 1910s and 1920s while representing New South Wales.

== Background ==
Tye was born in St Peters, New South Wales to parents Stephen and Georgina Tye on 12 December, 1892.

== Playing career ==
Initially, Tye played rugby league for the Western Suburbs club for five seasons between 1914–1916 and 1919-1920. He was known as an enterprising forward who represented New South Wales in 1919 and 1921. Tye is remembered as a foundation member in the first St. George DRLFC team in their foundation year of 1921. Tye remained at St George for seven seasons between 1921 and 1927 before retiring from the game.

== Death ==
Tye died suddenly at his Peakhurst, New South Wales home on 27 November 1936, age 43. His funeral was widely attended by many members of the St George District Rugby League Football Club and the Western Suburbs District Rugby League Football Club. His funeral was held at Woronora Crematorium, Sutherland, New South Wales.
