= Frank Egan =

Australian rugby league footballer

Personal information
- Full name: Francis Vincent Egan
- Born: 6 October 1906 Waverley, New South Wales, Australia
- Died: 17 November 1971 (aged 65) Randwick, New South Wales

Playing information
- Position: Halfback
Club
Years	Team	Pld	T	G	FG	P
1923–25	Eastern Suburbs	14	1	0	0	3

Frank Egan (1906–1971) was a professional rugby league footballer in Australian leading competition – the New South Wales Rugby League.

Frank Egan played with the Eastern Suburbs club in the 1923, 1924 and 1925 seasons and is recognised as that club's 139th player.
