= Gordon Stettler =

Australian rugby league footballer (1900-1951)

Personal information
- Full name: Godfrey Lonsdale Stettler
- Born: 13 March 1900 Sydney, New South Wales, Australia
- Died: 4 June 1951 (aged 51) Sydney, New South Wales, Australia

Playing information
- Position: Centre, Wing
Club
Years	Team	Pld	T	G	FG	P
1919–26	Western Suburbs	46	18	45	0	144
Representative
Years	Team	Pld	T	G	FG	P
1925	New South Wales	4	4	9	0	30
1925	Metropolis	1	1	0	0	3
- Source: As of 17 June 2019

Godfrey Lonsdale 'Gordon' Stettler (1900–1951) was an Australian rugby league footballer who played in the 1910s and 1920s.

== Playing career ==
Stettler played for the Western Suburbs club. Named Godfrey Lonsdale Stettler, after his father, but known as 'Gordon' or 'Lon', Stettler played eight seasons for Wests between 1919 and 1926 and also captained the club during his career.

He was also a representative player for New South Wales, featuring in four matches for the Blues in 1925.

In 1925 he played cricket for the Westmead CC 'A' team, winning the District Premiership.

== Death ==
Stettler died on 4 June 1951, aged 51.
