= Harold Holmes (rugby league) =

Australian rugby league footballer

Personal information
- Full name: Harold Holmes
- Born: 30 November 1894 Hamilton, New South Wales, Australia
- Died: 3 August 1954 (aged 59) Lakemba, New South Wales

Playing information
- Position: Second-row
Club
Years	Team	Pld	T	G	FG	P
1917	Western Suburbs	1	1	0	0	3
1918–20	South Sydney	25	5	1	0	17
1921–24	Eastern Suburbs	47	15	0	0	45
	Total	73	21	1	0	65
- Relatives: Len Holmes (son)

Harold Holmes (1894-1954) was an Australian rugby league footballer who played in the 1910s and 1920s who played for Western Suburbs, South Sydney and Eastern Suburbs in the NSWRL competition. His position was at second-row.

== Playing career ==
Holmes made his first grade debut for Western Suburbs against Annandale at St Luke's Park now known as Concord Oval. Holmes scored a try in a 11–6 victory. The following year, Holmes switched clubs and joined South Sydney. In his first year with Souths, Holmes played 13 games as the club won the 1918 premiership. In 1921, Holmes joined arch rivals Eastern Suburbs and in 1923 was a member of the premiership winning team that year defeating his former club Souths 15–12 in the grand final played at the Sydney Cricket Ground. Holmes played one further season and retired at the end of 1924.
