= Tom Barry (rugby league, born 1901) =

Australian rugby league footballer

Personal information
- Full name: Thomas Barry
- Born: 29 July 1903; Sydney, New South Wales, Australia
- Died: 9 June 1969 (aged 65)

Playing information
- Position: Centre, Wing
Club
Years	Team	Pld	T	G	FG	P
1922–27	University	53	14	1	0	44
- Source: As of 30 April 2019

Tom Barry (1901–1969) was an Australian professional rugby league footballer who played in the 1920s. He played in the New South Wales Rugby League (NSWRL). He played for University in the New South Wales Rugby League (NSWRL) competition. Barry is not to confused with Tom Barry who played for South Sydney and Eastern Suburbs.

== Playing career ==
Barry made his first grade debut for University against Western Suburbs in Round 7 1922 at Pratten Park in a 39-5 loss. University went on to finish the 1922 season in second last place. In 1923 and 1924, University finished last on the table claiming back to back wooden spoons. Barry then missed the entire 1925 season before returning in 1926.

In 1926, University went on to finish 4th on the table and qualified for their first finals campaign. The Students went on to defeat Glebe to reach the grand final with Barry scoring a try in the preliminary final victory. In the grand final, The Students opponents were South Sydney who boasted the likes of George Treweek, Eddie Root and Alf Blair and had gone the previous season undefeated. Barry played at centre in the game as Souths raced out to an 11-0 lead at halftime. A second half fightback by University was not enough and Souths ran out winners 11-5 at the Royal Agricultural Society Grounds in front of 20,000 spectators.

In 1927, University finished last on the table and claimed the wooden spoon. Barry's last game for the club was against Newtown at Earl Park, Arncliffe in Round 18 1927. Barry finished the 1927 season as the club's joint top try scorer.
