= Ern Wilmot =

Australian rugby league footballer

Personal information
- Full name: Ernest Ambrose Wilmot
- Born: 26 August 1898; Waterloo, New South Wales, Australia
- Died: 13 September 1988 (aged 90); Sydney, New South Wales, Australia

Playing information
- Position: Hooker
Club
Years	Team	Pld	T	G	FG	P
1921–24	South Sydney	49	0	0	0	0
Representative
Years	Team	Pld	T	G	FG	P
1922	Metropolis	1	0	0	0	0

Ernest Ambrose Wilmot (1898–1988) was an Australian rugby league player who played in the 1920s.

== Background ==
Wilmot was born at Waterloo, New South Wales in 1898.

== Playing career ==
He came through the Souths junior league to play first grade with the South Sydney Rabbitohs for four seasons between 1921 and 1924. He played hooker in the 1924 Grand Final against Balmain, in which Souths lost 3–0.

== Death ==
Wilmot died on 13 September 1988, aged 90.
