= Jack Lawrence (rugby league) =

Australian rugby league player

Personal information
- Full name: Jack Lawrence
- Born: 21 March 1897 Waterloo, New South Wales, Australia

Playing information
- Position: Hooker, Lock, Prop
Club
Years	Team	Pld	T	G	FG	P
1918–28	South Sydney	67	16	41	0	130
- Relatives: Vic Lawrence (brother)

Jack Lawrence (born 21 March 1897; date of death unknown) was an Australian rugby league footballer who played in the 1910s and 1920s. He played for South Sydney in the NSWRL competition during which the club won 5 premierships in 11 seasons. Lawrence was the older brother of Vic Lawrence who played for South Sydney in the 1920s.

== Playing career ==
Lawrence made his first grade debut for Souths against North Sydney in Round 1 1918 at North Sydney Oval. Lawrence would go on to win a premiership with Souths in his debut season as the club finished first on the table and were declared premiers without needing to play in a grand final.

In 1923, Souths reached the grand final against Eastern Suburbs. Lawrence played at lock in the 15–12 defeat which was played at the Sydney Cricket Ground. Lawrence finished 1923 as the club's top point scorer.

In 1924, Souths again reached the grand final against rivals Balmain. Lawrence played at prop in the match which Souths lost 3-0 which was the lowest scoring grand final at the time.

In 1925, Lawrence was part of the South Sydney side which went the entire season undefeated and won the premiership outright without needing to play in a grand final.

Over the next few seasons, Lawrence played sporadically for Souths and did not play in the club's premiership victories between 1926 and 1928. Lawrence retired at the end of 1928 and played a total of 95 games for Souths across all grades.
