= Perce Horne =

Australian rugby league footballer and administrator

Personal information
- Full name: John Percy Horne
- Born: 16 September 1890 Waterloo, New South Wales, Australia
- Died: 21 January 1990 (aged 99) Cronulla, New South Wales, Australia

Playing information
- Position: Second-row
Club
Years	Team	Pld	T	G	FG	P
1919–23	South Sydney	24	0	2	0	2
1925	Newtown	2	0	0	0	0
	Total	26	0	2	0	2

John Percy "Perc" or "Perce" Horne (1890–1990) was an Australian rugby league footballer who played in the 1910s and 1920s.

== Background ==
Horner was born at Waterloo, New South Wales on 16 September 1890.

== Playing career ==
Horne played rugby league from childhood, in the South's junior league. He was graded at Souths in the clubs pioneering years of the 1910s and played first grade during the 1919, 1923 and 1924 seasons.

Horne played in the grand final for South Sydney in 1923. He played his final season at Newtown in 1925.

== Post playing ==
Horne was known as the 'grand old man' of the South Sydney Rabbitohs club. He was the honorary-secretary of Souths reserve grade team for 47 years before his retirement in 1973. Horne was made a life member of South Sydney Rabbitohs in 1961, and he became the longest serving district official in NSWRFL history.

== Death ==
Horne died at a nursing home at Cronulla, New South Wales on 21 January 1990, in his 100th year.
