= Edward Connerton =

Australian rugby league footballer

Personal information
- Full name: Edward Lawrence Connerton
- Born: 1897
- Died: 1971 (aged 73–74)

Playing information
- Position: Wing, Centre
Club
Years	Team	Pld	T	G	FG	P
1919–23	Eastern Suburbs	19	1	0	0	3

Edward Lawrence "Con" Connerton (1897-1971) was a rugby league footballer for the Eastern Suburbs club in the New South Wales Rugby Football League premiership.

A wing, he played 4 seasons between 1919 and 1923 for Easts and was a member of their fourth premiership winning side in NSWRFL season 1923.

"Con" Connerton is recognized as the club's 110th player.

== Sources ==
- Alan Whiticker & Glen Hudson: The Encyclopedia of Rugby League Players
