= Pat Murphy (rugby league) =

Australian rugby league footballer

Personal information
- Full name: Patrick Murphy
- Born: 1896 Sydney, New South Wales, Australia

Playing information
- Position: Second-row, Lock
Club
| Years | Team | Pld | T | G | FG | P |
|---|---|---|---|---|---|---|
| 1920–26 | South Sydney | 39 | 4 | 0 | 0 | 12 |
Representative
| Years | Team | Pld | T | G | FG | P |
| 1925 | New South Wales | 4 | 1 | 0 | 0 | 3 |
| 1923 | Metropolis | 1 | 0 | 0 | 0 | 0 |

Pat Murphy was an Australian rugby league footballer who played in the 1920s. He played for South Sydney in the New South Wales Rugby League (NSWRL) competition.

== Playing career ==
Murphy made his first grade debut for Souths against University in Round 15 1920 at Marrickville Oval.

In 1923, Souths reached the grand final against Eastern Suburbs. Murphy played for Souths in the 15-12 defeat which was played at the Sydney Cricket Ground.

In 1924, Souths again reached the grand final against rivals Balmain. Murphy played in the game which Souths lost 3-0. This was the lowest scoring grand final at the time.

In 1925, Murphy was part of the South Sydney side which went the entire season undefeated and won the premiership outright without needing to play in a grand final. In 1926, Murphy made 4 appearances for Souths but missed out on playing in the club's premiership victory over University.

Overall, Murphy made a total of 60 appearances for Souths across all grades.
