= Jack Dawson (rugby league) =

Australian rugby league footballer

Personal information
- Full name: Jack Dawson

Playing information
- Position: Centre
Club
Years	Team	Pld	T	G	FG	P
1923–24	Eastern Suburbs	23	9	0	0	27
1926	Balmain	5	0	0	0	0
	Total	28	9	0	0	27
Representative
Years	Team	Pld	T	G	FG	P
1924	New South Wales	5	0	0	0	0
- Source: As of 14 February 2019

Jack Dawson was an Australian first-grade rugby league and rugby union footballer.

== Playing career ==
After converting from rugby union to rugby league Jack Dawson played in the New South Wales Rugby Football League premiership with Eastern Suburbs in the (1923–24) seasons before joining Balmain in 1926.

A centre, Dawson was a member of Eastern Suburbs' fourth premiership winning side in NSWRFL season 1923.

Dawson was also a representative of NSW.

In the 1925 season, Dawson coached the rural NSW side Temora, in their local rugby league competition.
