= Bill Gillespie (rugby league) =

Australian rugby league footballer

Personal information
- Full name: William Charles Gillespie
- Born: 22 November 1894; Surry Hills, New South Wales, Australia
- Died: 11 September 1945 (aged 50); Sydney, New South Wales, Australia

Playing information
- Position: Five-eighth, Centre
Club
Years	Team	Pld	T	G	FG	P
1916–19	Newtown	45	10	0	0	30
1920–23	South Sydney	45	8	0	0	24
	Total	90	18	0	0	54
Representative
Years	Team	Pld	T	G	FG	P
1921–22	New South Wales	2	1	0	0	3

William Charles Gillespie (22 November 1894 Surry Hills, Sydney – 11 September 1945) was an Australian rugby league footballer who played in the 1910s and 1920s.

== Playing career ==
Gillespie played for the South Sydney Rabbitohs from 1920 to 1923. Known as "Tiger", Gillespie was a small man who played most of his career at five-eighth. In an article written shortly after Gillespie's death in 1945, sportswriter W.F. Corbett (the younger), wrote "Gillespie was called 'Tiger' because of his fierce tackling", noting also that he "was one of the lightest men big football has ever known, for he scaled only about 8st. 9lbs (55 kg)".

Tiger Gillespie captained the 1923 team to the grand final, where the Rabbitohs were runners-up to Easts. He played for NSW against Queensland in 1921, and toured with the NSW side to New Zealand in September 1922.
