= Vic Lawrence (rugby league) =

Australian rugby league footballer

Personal information
- Full name: Victor Lawrence
- Born: 9 June 1898 Waterloo, New South Wales, Australia
- Died: 28 June 1940 (aged 42) Sydney, New South Wales, Australia

Playing information
- Position: Centre, Wing
Club
Years	Team	Pld	T	G	FG	P
1920–28	South Sydney	93	43	1	0	131
Representative
Years	Team	Pld	T	G	FG	P
1927	New South Wales	3	0	0	0	0
1928	NSW City	2	2	0	0	6
1927	Metropolis	1	1	0	0	3
- Relatives: Jack Lawrence (brother)

Victor Lawrence (9 June 1898 – 28 June 1940) was an Australian rugby league player who played in the 1920s. Lawrence was the brother of Jack Lawrence who also played for Souths.

== Background ==
Lawrence was born at Waterloo, New South Wales in 1898.

== Playing career ==
Lawrence played his junior football for Waterloo, and was graded with South Sydney in 1920. Lawrence played nine seasons with Souths between 1920–1928 and played in two winning Grand Finals in 1926 and 1927. He also played 11 games in the 1925 season as the club went undefeated to claim the premiership. He mostly played centre in teams that featured the greats of the era such as Alf Blair, Benny Wearing, George Treweek and Eddie Root.

He represented New South Wales on three occasions in 1927. He played a total of 125 games for South Sydney across all grades.

== Death ==
Lawrence died on 28 June 1940 aged 42.
