= Tom Molloy =

Australian rugby league footballer

Personal information
- Full name: Thomas J. Molloy

Playing information
- Position: Prop, Hooker
Club
Years	Team	Pld	T	G	FG	P
1921–22	St George Dragons	7	0	1	0	2
1923–26	Eastern Suburbs	38	1	0	0	3
	Total	45	1	1	0	5

Tom Molloy (Australia), was a rugby league footballer in the New South Wales Rugby League (NSWRL), Australia's major rugby league competition.

A front-rower, Molloy played 7 matches for St George in the years 1921–1922 and 42 for the Eastern Suburbs club in the years 1923–1926.

As well as playing for the St George Dragons in their foundation 1921 season, Molloy was also a member of the Eastern Suburbs side that defeated South Sydney in the 1923 premiership decider.
