= George Agar (rugby league) =

Australian rugby league footballer

Personal information
- Full name: William George Agar
- Born: 7 October 1902
- Died: 17 July 1966 (aged 63)

Playing information
- Position: Centre
Club
Years	Team	Pld	T	G	FG	P
1923–24	Eastern Suburbs	15	2	0	0	6

William George Agar (7 October 1902 – 17 July 1966) was a rugby league footballer in Australia's leading competition - the New South Wales Rugby League (NSWRL).

Agar played 15 matches for the Eastern Suburbs club in the 1923–24 seasons. A Centre, Agar played in the 1923 premiership winning side. As a junior, Agar was also a member of the Eastern Suburbs side that won the presidents Cup in 1922 and is recognised as that club's 123rd player.
