= Arthur Oxford =

Australian rugby league footballer

Personal information
- Full name: Arthur Thomas Oxford
- Born: 27 June 1894 Sydney, New South Wales, Australia
- Died: 1 June 1980 (aged 85) Sydney, New South Wales, Australia

Playing information
- Position: Hooker
Club
Years	Team	Pld	T	G	FG	P
1915–21	South Sydney	76	18	121	0	296
1922–29	Eastern Suburbs	103	18	257	0	568
	Total	179	36	378	0	864
Representative
Years	Team	Pld	T	G	FG	P
1919–24	Australia	5	1	7	0	17
1919–24	New South Wales	17	3	38	0	85
1925	Queensland	1	0	1	0	2
1920–22	Metropolis	3	1	4	0	11
- Relatives: Gary Stevens (grandson)

Arthur Thomas Oxford (1894–1980) was an Australian rugby league footballer, a state and national representative whose club career was played with the Eastern Suburbs club and South Sydney from 1915 to 1929.

== Club career ==
A noted point scorer, Oxford played with South Sydney for 7 seasons between 1915 and 1921. He won a premiership with Souths in NSWRL season 1918.

Oxford then switched to Eastern Suburbs for another 7 seasons between 1922 and 1929, winning the premiership with them in NSWRL season 1923.

In 1920 he kicked a then-record 23 successive goals in club matches for South Sydney Rabbitohs. In the season 1923, he was the NSW Rugby Football League's top point scorer with 113 points (5 tries and 49 goals). Oxford was also Captain of Sydney Roosters on many occasions.

In 1927 he overtook Harold Horder's record for the most points scored in an NSWRFL career (758); Oxford's eventual total of 864 stood as the new career record for twenty seasons until it was bettered by Tom Kirk in 1946. Oxford's total club career tally over fourteen seasons was 36 tries and 378 goals for 864 points.

Arthur Oxford is Eastern Suburbs player number 127.

== Representative career ==
He represented for New South Wales in twenty-two matches against Queensland from 1919 - 1924. He made five Test appearances in the Australia national rugby league team touring against New Zealand in 1919 and later against Great Britain. In 1925 during a season as captain-coach of Rockhampton in Queensland, he was selected as a Queensland representative, playing one match in 1925 making him the only player to represent both states.

== Family ==
His son, also called Arthur Oxford, played first grade for Easts in the 1944, 1948,1949 and 1950; his other son Kevin played lower grades for Easts. His grandsons Gary, Wayne and Brett Stevens and Colin Oxford played for South Sydney. Gary Stevens was a South Sydney Rabbitohs star of the 1960s and 1970s and an Australian Test representative.

Arthur Oxford died on 1 June 1980, 26 days short of his 86th birthday.

Preceded by Harold Horder (1918)	Record-holder; Most points in an NSWRFL career 1927 (759) - 1946 (864)	Succeeded by Tom Kirk (1946)
