= Cyril Abotomey =

Australian rugby league footballer

Personal information
- Full name: Cecil Phillip Abotomey
- Born: 4 July 1902 White Cliffs, New South Wales, Australia
- Died: 20 December 1980 (aged 78) Brisbane, Queensland

Playing information
- Position: Centre
Club
Years	Team	Pld	T	G	FG	P
1923–24	Eastern Suburbs	21	4	2	0	16
- Source: As of 4 May 2020

Cecil "Cyril" Abotomey OBE (1902 – 20 December 1980) was an Australian rugby league footballer for the Eastern Suburbs club of the New South Wales Rugby League competition.

== Playing career ==
Abotomey was a Paddington junior in Rugby League and Cricket and also played junior Australian rules football for the Double Bay side. In rugby league he played in both the centre and wing positions and was a member of Eastern Suburbs 1923 premiership winning side. Abotomey was also a member of the Eastern Suburbs side that won the President's Cup in 1922, and is officially recognised as Eastern Suburbs' 138th player. He eventually moved to Brisbane and continued his career there.

== Death ==
He died in Brisbane in 1980 and was buried at the Toowong Cemetery on 22 December 1980.
