= Ed Rigney =

Australian rugby league footballer

Personal information
- Full name: Edward Patrick Rigney
- Born: 29 July 1893 Sydney, New South Wales, Australia
- Died: 23 August 1975 (aged 82) Pagewood, New South Wales, Australia

Playing information
- Position: Fullback
Club
Years	Team	Pld	T	G	FG	P
1915–19	Newtown	38	0	0	1	2
1920–26	Eastern Suburbs	63	0	2	0	4
	Total	101	0	2	1	6
Representative
Years	Team	Pld	T	G	FG	P
1919–21	New South Wales	2	0	0	0	0
1922	Metropolis	2	0	0	0	0

Ed 'Snowy' Rigney (1893–1975), was a rugby league footballer for Newtown and the Eastern Suburbs clubs who played in the New South Wales Rugby League.

== Playing career ==
Snowy Rigney began his rugby league career with the Newtown club in 1917, he played in 38 matches with that club before joining Eastern Suburbs in 1920.

A fullback, Rigney played 63 matches for the Eastern Suburbs club in the years 1920-24 & 1926 including the 1923 premiership decider. He was often nicknamed 'Muscles' due to his small statue. His son, Ted, was an aspiring amateur golfer in the 1940s and 1950s.

Rigney was selected to represent New South Wales rugby league team in 1919 and 1921 and is recognized as the Newtown Jets' 107th player, and the Sydney Roosters' 114th player.
