= Sid Kaufman =

Australian rugby league footballer

Sid Kaufmann
Personal information
- Full name: Sydney James Kaufmann
- Born: 13 May 1891; Sydney, New South Wales, Australia
- Died: 29 October 1971 (aged 80); Tamworth, New South Wales, Australia

Playing information
- Position: Halfback
Club
Years	Team	Pld	T	G	FG	P
1919–25	Eastern Suburbs	76	9	1	0	31
Representative
Years	Team	Pld	T	G	FG	P
1919	New South Wales	1	0	0	0	0
- Source: As of 26 June 2019

Sid 'Sandy' Kaufman (1891-1971) was an Australian professional rugby league footballer who played in the New South Wales Rugby League (NSWRL) competition.

== Playing career ==
Kaufman played for the Eastern Suburbs club in the years(1918–1924). A halfback 'Sandy' was a member of Easts 4th premiership winning side in 1923.

In the 1919 season, Kaufman represented New South Wales.
