= Les Steel =

Australian rugby league footballer

Personal information
- Full name: Leslie William Steel
- Born: 1900
- Died: 28 April 1966; Hurstville, New South Wales

Playing information
- Position: Wing
Club
Years	Team	Pld	T	G	FG	P
1922–29	Eastern Suburbs	125	63	2	0	193
Representative
Years	Team	Pld	T	G	FG	P
1922	New South Wales	1	0	0	0	0
1922	Metropolis	1	0	0	0	0

Leslie William Steel (1900 – 28 April 1966) was a rugby league footballer in Australia's major competition, the New South Wales Rugby League (NSWRL).

== Playing career ==
Steel played over 100 matches for his club side, Eastern Suburbs in the years (1922–29). A Winger, Steel was a try scorer in Easts 1923 premiership victory. In 1922 Steel was selected to represent New South Wales. He was the top try scorer for Eastern Suburbs in 1923, 1925 and 1928.

Following his football career, Steel spent many years as an official of the Eastern Suburbs club. He died at Hurstville, New South Wales in 1966.
