= Bill Ives (rugby league) =

Australian rugby league footballer

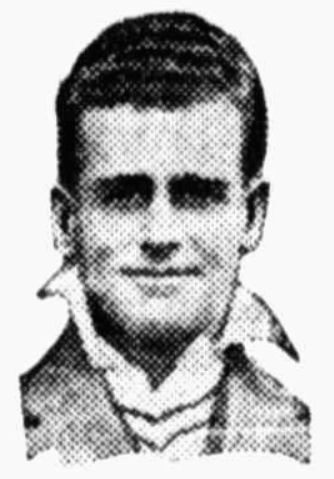

Personal information
- Full name: William Francis Ives
- Born: 14 November 1896 Glebe, New South Wales
- Died: 23 March 1975 (aged 78) Newport Beach, New South Wales

Playing information
- Position: Prop
Club
Years	Team	Pld	T	G	FG	P
1920	Glebe	12	3	0	0	9
1921–27	Eastern Suburbs	87	12	8	0	52
1928	St George	2	0	0	0	0
	Total	101	15	8	0	61
Representative
Years	Team	Pld	T	G	FG	P
1924–25	New South Wales	8	1	0	0	3
1925	Metropolis	1	1	0	0	3
- Source: As of 11 February 2019
- Relatives: Clarrie Ives (brother)

Bill Ives (1896–1975) was an Australian rugby league footballer who played in the 1920s.

== Playing career ==
Ives played for the Glebe in 1920, Eastern Suburbs between 1921-1927 and the St. George Dragons 1928 in the New South Wales Rugby Football League premiership in Australia. His usual position was at prop-forward. He won one premiership with Eastern Suburbs in 1923. He captained the club on many occasions.

He was the younger brother of Australian test player Clarrie Ives.

He also played first-class cricket for New South Wales as a right-handed lower-order batsman and a right-arm fast-medium bowler, appearing in seven matches between 1919–20 and 1921–22.

== See also ==
- List of New South Wales representative cricketers
