= 1982 Brisbane Rugby League season =

1982 Brisbane Rugby League
- Duration: May 16 – September 19, 1982
- Teams: 8
- Premiers: Wynnum-Manly
- Minor premiers: Fortitude Valley
- Matches played: 60
- Points scored: 1889
- Top points scorer(s): Gary Warnock (116)
- Player of the year: Tony Currie (Rothmans Medal)
- Top try-scorer(s): Terry Butler (12); Wayne Challis (12)

The 1982 Brisbane Rugby League premiership was the 74th season of Brisbane's professional rugby league football competition. Eight teams from across Brisbane competed for the premiership, which culminated in a grand final match between the Wynnum-Manly and Southern Suburbs clubs.

== Season summary ==
Unlike prior seasons, the 1982 Brisbane Rugby League season only consisted of 14 rounds due to the introduction of the Winfield State League, which ran from March 19 - May 2 and was not considered a part of the BRL premiership. Teams played each other twice, resulting in a top four of Southern Suburbs, Fortitude Valley, Wynnum-Manly and Redcliffe.

=== Teams ===
| Club | Home ground | Coach | Captain |
|---|---|---|---|
| Eastern Suburbs | Langlands Park | John Lang | Larry Brigginshaw |
| Fortitude Valley | Neumann Oval | Ross Strudwick | Wally Lewis |
| Northern Suburbs | Bishop Park | Graham Lowe | Shane Bernadin |
| Past Brothers | Corbett Park | Wayne Bennett | Greg Smith |
| Redcliffe | Dolphin Oval | Arthur Beetson | ~~Ian Pearce~~ → Bob Jones |
| Southern Suburbs | Davies Park | Bob McCarthy | Bruce Astill |
| Western Suburbs | Purtell Park | John Lohman | Norm Carr |
| Wynnum-Manly | Kougari Oval | Des Morris | Rod Morris |

=== Ladder ===
| | Team | Pld | W | D | L | PF | PA | PD | Pts |
|---|---|---|---|---|---|---|---|---|---|
| 1 | Fortitude Valley | 14 | 12 | 1 | 1 | 299 | 186 | +113 | 25 |
| 2 | Southern Suburbs | 14 | 10 | 0 | 4 | 252 | 184 | +68 | 20 |
| 3 | Wynnum-Manly (P) | 14 | 9 | 0 | 5 | 215 | 194 | +21 | 18 |
| 4 | Redcliffe | 14 | 7 | 0 | 7 | 226 | 225 | +1 | 14 |
| 5 | Northern Suburbs | 14 | 5 | 0 | 9 | 228 | 263 | -35 | 10 |
| 6 | Past Brothers | 14 | 4 | 1 | 9 | 190 | 233 | -43 | 9 |
| 7 | Eastern Suburbs | 14 | 4 | 0 | 10 | 184 | 224 | -40 | 8 |
| 8 | Western Suburbs | 14 | 4 | 0 | 10 | 193 | 278 | -85 | 8 |

== Finals ==
| Home | Score | Away | Match Information |
| Home | Score | Away | Date and Time | Venue | Referee | Crowd |
|---|---|---|---|---|---|---|
Semi-finals
| Wynnum-Manly | 35-0 | Redcliffe | 29 August 1982 | Lang Park | Eddie Ward |
| Southern Suburbs | 10-6 | Fortitude Valley | 5 September 1982 | Lang Park | Eddie Ward |
Preliminary Final
| Wynnum-Manly | 26-5 | Fortitude Valley | 12 September 1982 | Lang Park | Eddie Ward | 20,000 |
Grand Final
| Southern Suburbs | 3-17 | Wynnum-Manly | 19 September 1982 | Lang Park | Eddie Ward | 36,000 |

== Grand Final ==
Wynnum-Manly 17 (Tries: T. Butler, B. French, P. Dawes. Goals: W. Green 4.)

Southern Suburbs 3 (Tries: A. Lumby.)

== Winfield State League ==
The 1982 Winfield State League was the inaugural season of the Queensland Rugby League's statewide competition. A total of 14 teams competed in the inaugural season, 8 of which were BRL Premiership clubs. The remaining six were regional teams from across the state, hence the State League name. The finals were straight final four series held at QRL headquarters at Lang Park, with Easts and Redcliffe winning their respective semi finals. In the final, the Tigers outclassed the Dolphins 23-15 to win the inaugural Winfield State League.

1982 Winfield State League Final

1982

| Eastern Suburbs | 23-15 | Redcliffe |

Lang Park
