= 1976 Brisbane Rugby League season =

1976 Brisbane Rugby League
- Teams: 8
- Premiers: Western Suburbs
- Minor premiers: Eastern Suburbs

The 1976 Brisbane Rugby League season was the 69th season of Brisbane Rugby League premiership. Eight rugby league teams from across Brisbane competed for the premiership, which culminated in a grand final match between the Western Suburbs and Eastern Suburbs clubs.

== Season summary ==
Teams played each other three times, with 21 rounds of competition played. It resulted in a top five of Eastern Suburbs, Western Suburbs, Past Brothers, Redcliffe and Wynnum-Manly. However, Wynnum-Manly and Southern Suburbs finished the season equal on points, with Magpies defeating Seagulls in a mid-week play-off.

The 1976 season's Rothmans Medallist was Northern Suburbs forward Darryl Brohman. Brohman would later sign for Sydney club Penrith and feature for Canterbury in its 1984 NSWRL grand final win.

=== Teams ===
| Club | Home ground | Coach | Captain |
|---|---|---|---|
| Eastern Suburbs | Langlands Park | Des Morris | Des Morris |
| Fortitude Valley | Neumann Oval | | |
| Northern Suburbs | Bishop Park | | |
| Past Brothers | Corbett Park | | |
| Redcliffe | Redcliffe Showgrounds | Barry Muir | Ian Pearce |
| Southern Suburbs | Davies Park | | Greg Veivers |
| Western Suburbs | Purtell Park | Ron Raper | |
| Wynnum-Manly | Kougari Oval | | |

=== Ladder ===
| | Team | Pld | W | D | L | PF | PA | PD | Pts |
|---|---|---|---|---|---|---|---|---|---|
| 1 | Eastern Suburbs | 21 | 15 | 0 | 6 | 482 | 313 | +169 | 30 |
| 2 | Western Suburbs | 21 | 15 | 0 | 6 | 420 | 280 | +140 | 30 |
| 3 | Past Brothers | 21 | 13 | 0 | 8 | 395 | 260 | +135 | 26 |
| 4 | Redcliffe | 21 | 11 | 0 | 10 | 367 | 378 | -11 | 22 |
| 5 | Wynnum-Manly | 21 | 8 | 0 | 13 | 303 | 335 | -32 | 16 |
| 6 | Southern Suburbs | 21 | 8 | 0 | 13 | 329 | 428 | -99 | 16 |
| 7 | Fortitude Valley | 21 | 8 | 0 | 13 | 276 | 387 | -111 | 16 |
| 8 | Northern Suburbs | 21 | 6 | 0 | 15 | 291 | 482 | -191 | 12 |

== Finals ==
| Home | Score | Away | Match Information |
| Home | Score | Away | Date and Time | Venue | Referee | Crowd |
|---|---|---|---|---|---|---|
Playoffs
| Southern Suburbs | 19-12 | Fortitude Valley | 24 August 1976 | Lang Park |
| Wynnum-Manly | 12-17 | Southern Suburbs | 26 August 1976 | Lang Park |
Qualifying Finals
| Redcliffe | 6-14 | Southern Suburbs | 28 August 1976 | Lang Park | Ian Smith | 8,000 |
| Western Suburbs | 10–19 | Past Brothers | 29 August 1976 | Lang Park | Bernie Pramberg |
Semi-finals
| Western Suburbs | 11-5 | Southern Suburbs | 4 September 1976 | Lang Park | Ian Smith |
| Eastern Suburbs | 13-3 | Past Brothers | 5 September 1976 | Lang Park | Eddie Ward |
Preliminary Final
| Past Brothers | 10-18 | Western Suburbs | 12 September 1976 | Lang Park | Bernie Pramberg |
Grand Final
| Eastern Suburbs | 1-16 | Western Suburbs | 19 September 1976 | Lang Park | Bernie Pramberg | 37,000 |

== Grand Final ==
| Western Suburbs | Position | Eastern Suburbs |
|---|---|---|
| 1. Greg McCarthy | FB | 1. Roger Kuhn |
| 2. Mick Reardon | WG | 2. John Callus |
| 3. Harry Cameron | CE | 3. Bevan de Bruyn |
| 4. Steve Crear | CE | 4. Steve Farquhar |
| 5. Wayne Stewart | WG | 5. Nick Nicolau |
| 6. Geoff Richardson | FE | 6. Greg Holben |
| 7. Greg Oliphant | HB | 7. Wayne Lindenberg |
| 13. Max Williamson | PR | 13. Geoff Naylor |
| 12. Gary Prickett | HK | 12. John Lang |
| 11. Bob Green | PR | 11. Rod Morris |
| 10. John Young | SR | 10. Des Morris |
| 9. Rod Bradshaw | SR | 9. John Payne |
| 8. John Ribot | LK | 8. John Abbott |
| 16. Norm Carr | Reserves | Errol Slingsby |
| 19. Henry Williamson | Reserves | Alan Currie |
| Ron Raper | Coach | Des Morris |

Western Suburbs made it two premierships in succession, after defeating favourites Eastern Suburbs in an anticlimactic decider.

Easts' solitary point was a field goal by second-rower John Payne, who temporarily gave Tigers the lead in the first-half.

Man of the match Gary Prickett scored the opening try for Wests, with lock John Ribot scoring the second just before half-time. Wests lead 12–1 at half-time and effectively repelled all Easts' efforts in the second-half.

The match was virtually without incident. The most blatant was a high tackle by John Payne on Wests' prop, Max Williamson. Williamson had to be helped from the field, with Payne receiving a long lecture from referee Bernie Pramberg.

Western Suburbs 16 (Tries: Gary Prickett, John Ribot. Goals: Wayne Stewart 5)

Eastern Suburbs 1 (Field goal: John Payne)
