= 1978 Brisbane Rugby League season =

1978 Brisbane Rugby League
- Duration: March 27 – September 17, 1978
- Teams: 8
- Premiers: Eastern Suburbs
- Minor premiers: Redcliffe Dolphins
- Matches played: 88
- Points scored: 2941
- Top points scorer(s): Ian Pearce (266)
- Player of the year: Ian Pearce (Rothmans Medal)

The 1978 Brisbane Rugby League premiership was the 71st season of Brisbane's professional rugby league football competition. Eight teams from across Brisbane competed for the premiership, which culminated in a grand final match between the Eastern Suburbs and Fortitude Valley clubs.

== Season summary ==
Teams played each other three times, with 21 rounds of competition played. It resulted in a top four of Eastern Suburbs, Redcliffe, Western Suburbs and Fortitude Valley.

=== Teams ===
Club	Home ground	Coach	Captain
Eastern Suburbs	Langlands Park	Des Morris	Des Morris
Fortitude Valley	Neumann Oval	Johnny Rhodes	Ross Strudwick
Northern Suburbs	Bishop Park	Bob Bax	Bruce Warwick
Past Brothers	Corbett Park	Reg Cannon	Paul Beauchamp
Redcliffe	Redcliffe Showgrounds	Ian Pearce	Ian Pearce
Southern Suburbs	Davies Park	Wayne Bennett	Greg Veivers
Western Suburbs	Purtell Park	Don Oxenham	Mark Hogan
Wynnum-Manly	Kougari Oval	Dennis Ward	Robert Orchard

=== Ladder ===
	Team	Pld	W	D	L	PF	PA	PD	Pts
1	Redcliffe	21	16	0	5	502	306	+196	32
2	Eastern Suburbs (P)	21	14	0	7	451	249	+202	28
3	Fortitude Valley	21	13	0	8	317	328	-11	26
4	Western Suburbs	21	11	0	10	339	306	+33	22
5	Southern Suburbs	21	9	0	12	322	369	-47	18
6	Wynnum-Manly	21	8	0	13	305	378	-73	16
7	Past Brothers	21	7	0	14	274	474	-200	14
8	Northern Suburbs	21	6	0	15	313	413	-100	12

== Finals ==
Home	Score	Away	Match Information
Home	Score	Away	Date and Time	Venue	Referee	Crowd
Semi-finals
Fortitude Valley	17–10	Western Suburbs	27 August 1978	Lang Park	Eddie Ward	15,000
Eastern Suburbs	21–16	Redcliffe	3 September 1978	Lang Park	Ian Smith
Preliminary Final
Fortitude Valley	17–13	Redcliffe	10 September 1978	Lang Park	Eddie Ward	18,000
Grand Final
Eastern Suburbs	14–10	Fortitude Valley	17 September 1978	Lang Park	Eddie Ward	30,000

== Grand Final ==
Eastern Suburbs 14 (Tries: R. Morris, G. Holben. Goals: G. McDonald 3, W. Lindenburg.)

Fortitude Valley 10 (Tries: V. Wieland, M. Neill. Goals: M. Neill, A. Mills.)
