= 1979 Brisbane Rugby League season =

1979 Brisbane Rugby League
- Duration: March 24 – September 16, 1979
- Teams: 8
- Premiers: Fortitude Valley
- Minor premiers: Eastern Suburbs
- Matches played: 88
- Points scored: 3120
- Player of the year: Neville Draper (Rothmans Medal)

The 1979 Brisbane Rugby League premiership was the 72nd season of Brisbane's professional rugby league football competition. Eight teams from across Brisbane competed for the premiership, which culminated in a grand final match between the Fortitude Valley and Southern Suburbs clubs.

== Season summary ==
Teams played each other three times, with 21 rounds of competition played. It resulted in a top four of Fortitude Valley, Eastern Suburbs, Southern Suburbs and Western Suburbs.

1979 Great Britain Lions tour's Australian leg saw several matches against teams across Queensland, several involving BRL players, such as the 3 Test matches against Australia and single matches against Queensland and Brisbane.

=== Teams ===
Club	Home ground	Coach	Captain
Eastern Suburbs	Langlands Park	Des Morris	Des Morris
Fortitude Valley	Neumann Oval	Ross Strudwick	Ross Strudwick
Northern Suburbs	Bishop Park	Graham Lowe	Mark Murray
Past Brothers	Corbett Park	Reg Cannon	David Sinclair
Redcliffe	Dolphin Oval	Ron Raper	Ian Pearce
Southern Suburbs	Davies Park	Wayne Bennett	~~Greg Veivers~~ → Bruce Astill
Western Suburbs	Purtell Park	Don Oxenham	Norm Carr
Wynnum-Manly	Kougari Oval	Henry Holloway	

=== Ladder ===
	Team	Pld	W	D	L	PF	PA	PD	Pts
1	Fortitude Valley (P)	21	17	1	3	549	263	+286	35
2	Eastern Suburbs	21	14	0	7	435	315	+120	28
3	Southern Suburbs	21	13	0	8	374	312	+62	26
4	Western Suburbs	21	12	1	8	381	310	+71	25
5	Northern Suburbs	21	9	0	12	337	418	-81	18
6	Redcliffe	21	7	0	14	286	426	-140	14
7	Past Brothers	21	5	1	15	350	488	-138	11
8	Wynnum-Manly	21	5	1	15	284	464	-180	11

== Finals ==
Home	Score	Away	Match information
Home	Score	Away	Date and time	Venue	Referee	Crowd
Semi-finals
Southern Suburbs	22-13	Western Suburbs	26 August 1979	Lang Park	Eddie Ward
Fortitude Valley	27-2	Eastern Suburbs	2 September 1979	Lang Park	H. Dearness	23,000
Preliminary Final
Southern Suburbs	18-16	Eastern Suburbs	9 September 1979	Lang Park	Eddie Ward	23,000
Grand Final
Fortitude Valley	26-0	Southern Suburbs	16 September 1979	Lang Park	Eddie Ward	35,000

== Grand Final ==
Fortitude Valley 26 (Tries: C. Close, V. Wieland, P. McWhirter, J. McLeod. Goals: M. Neill 6. Field Goals: W. Lewis, R. Strudwick.)

Southern Suburbs 0
