= 1985 Brisbane Rugby League season =

1985 Brisbane Rugby League
- Duration: March 1 – September 30, 1985
- Teams: 8
- Premiers: Southern Suburbs
- Minor premiers: Southern Suburbs
- Matches played: 88
- Points scored: 3113
- Top points scorer(s): Warren Green (176)
- Player of the year: Ian French (Rothmans Medal)
- Top try-scorer(s): Ray Ovens (12)

The 1985 Brisbane Rugby League premiership was the 77th season of Brisbane's professional rugby league football competition. Eight teams from across Brisbane competed for the premiership, which culminated in a grand final match between the Southern Suburbs and Wynnum-Manly clubs.

== Season summary ==
The format of the 1985 season remained unchanged from the previous year; teams played a total of 21 first-grade games over the pre-season, three games against other Brisbane sides during the Winfield State League, and the 14-round regular season. Teams played each other three times, twice during the regular season and once during either the pre-season or state league. It resulted in a top four of Southern Suburbs, Past Brothers, Wynnum-Manly and Fortitude Valley.

=== Teams ===
Club	Home ground	Coach	Captain
Eastern Suburbs	Langlands Park	Wayne Lindenberg	Cavill Heugh
Fortitude Valley	Neumann Oval	Peter McWhirter	Ross Henrick
Northern Suburbs	Bishop Park	John Barber	John Dowling
Past Brothers	Corbett Park	Ross Strudwick	Pat Shepherdson
Redcliffe	Dolphin Oval	Ian Pearce	Mitch Brennan
Southern Suburbs	Davies Park	Wayne Bennett	Norm Carr
Western Suburbs	Purtell Park	Trevor Day	Kevin Langer
Wynnum-Manly	Kougari Oval	Des Morris	David Green

=== Results ===
Team	P1	P2	P3	P4	ST1	ST2	ST3	ST4	ST5	ST6	8	9	10	11	12	13	14	15	16	17	18	19	20	21	F1	F2	GF
Eastern Suburbs Tigers	WYN -32	NOR -3	SOU +12	WST -4	Y	Y	VAL +4	BRO -27	Y	RED +16	WYN -8	NOR +2	SOU +16	WST +20	BRO -2	VAL +2	RED +7	WYN -11	NOR +24	WST -2	SOU -40	BRO -4	VAL -12	RED +2			
Fortitude Valley Diehards	RED +4	WST +36	NOR +8	BRO -13	Y	WYN -4	EST -4	Y	SOU -1	Y	RED +16	WST 0	NOR +32	BRO +2	SOU -2	EST -2	WYN +14	RED +6	WST 0	BRO -18	NOR +18	SOU -16	EST +12	WYN -22	WYN -3		
Northern Suburbs Devils	SOU -7	EST +3	VAL -8	WYN +1	WST +8	RED -4	Y	Y	BRO -8	Y	SOU -18	EST -2	VAL -32	WYN -6	WST +16	RED +6	BRO -14	SOU +2	EST -24	WYN -16	VAL -18	WST +7	RED -7	BRO -2			
Past Brothers	WST +4	RED +18	WYN -8	VAL +13	SOU -10	Y	Y	EST +27	NOR +8	Y	WST +8	RED -4	WYN +36	VAL -2	EST +2	SOU -12	NOR +14	WST +27	RED +4	VAL +18	WYN +6	EST +4	SOU -8	NOR +2	SOU -6	WYN -9	
Redcliffe Dolphins	VAL -4	BRO -18	WST +34	SOU -12	Y	NOR +4	Y	WYN -30	Y	EST -16	VAL -16	BRO +4	WST +24	SOU +22	WYN -7	NOR -6	EST -7	VAL -6	BRO -4	SOU -10	WST +34	WYN +2	NOR +7	EST -2			
Southern Suburbs Magpies	NOR +7	WYN -10	EST -12	RED +12	BRO +10	Y	WST +24	Y	VAL +1	Y	NOR +18	WYN -14	EST -16	RED -22	VAL +2	BRO +12	WST +26	NOR -2	WYN +38	RED +10	EST +40	VAL +16	BRO +8	WST +21	BRO +6	X	WYN +2
Western Suburbs Panthers	BRO -4	VAL -36	RED -34	EST +4	NOR -8	Y	SOU -24	Y	Y	WYN -28	BRO -8	VAL 0	RED -24	EST -20	NOR -16	WYN -2	SOU -26	BRO -27	VAL 0	EST +2	RED -34	NOR -7	WYN -38	SOU -21			
Wynnum-Manly Seagulls	EST +32	SOU +10	BRO +8	NOR -1	Y	VAL +4	Y	RED +30	Y	WST +28	EST +8	SOU +14	BRO -36	NOR +6	RED +7	WST +2	VAL -14	EST +11	SOU -38	NOR +16	BRO -6	RED -2	WST +38	VAL +22	VAL +3	BRO +9	SOU -2
Team	P1	P2	P3	P4	ST1	ST2	ST3	ST4	ST5	ST6	8	9	10	11	12	13	14	15	16	17	18	19	20	21	F1	F2	GF

- X - Bye
- Y - Team played a non-first grade State League match
- Opponent for round listed above margin

=== Ladder ===
	Team	Pld	W	D	L	PF	PA	PD	Pts
1	Southern Suburbs (P)	21	15	0	6	415	246	+169	30
2	Past Brothers	21	15	0	6	438	291	+147	30
3	Wynnum-Manly	21	15	0	6	468	349	+119	30
4	Fortitude Valley	21	10	2	9	390	324	+66	22
5	Eastern Suburbs	21	10	0	11	391	421	-30	20
6	Redcliffe	21	8	0	13	320	327	-7	16
7	Northern Suburbs	21	7	0	14	296	421	-125	14
8	Western Suburbs	21	2	2	17	257	598	-311	6

== Finals ==
Home	Score	Away	Match Information
Home	Score	Away	Date and Time	Venue	Referee	Crowd
Semi-finals
Wynnum-Manly	25-22	Fortitude Valley	1 September 1985	Lang Park	David Manson
Southern Suburbs	14-8	Past Brothers	8 September 1985	Lang Park	Eddie Ward
Preliminary Final
Wynnum-Manly	35-16	Past Brothers	15 September 1985	Lang Park	Eddie Ward
Grand Final
Southern Suburbs	10-8	Wynnum-Manly	22 September 1985	Lang Park	David Manson	31,000

== Grand Final ==
Southern Suburbs 10 (Tries: N. Carr. Goals: G. French 3.)

Wynnum-Manly 8 (Tries: C. Adams. Goals: W. Green 2.)

Souths, coached by Wayne Bennett and captained by Norm Carr edged out Wally Lewis' Wynnum Manly by one successful goal kick.

== Winfield State League ==
The 1985 Winfield State League was the inaugural season of the Queensland Rugby League's statewide competition. A total of 14 teams competed in the season, 8 of which were BRL Premiership clubs. The remaining six were regional teams from across the state, hence the State League name. The finals were straight final four series held at QRL headquarters at Lang Park, with Wynnum-Manly and the Brisbane Brothers winning their respective semi finals. In the final, the Seagulls completed a 16-0 shutout of the Brothers to win their second consecutive Winfield State League title.

1985 Winfield State League Final

1985

Wynnum Manly	16-0	Brisbane Brothers

Lang Park
