= 1980 Brisbane Rugby League season =

1980 Brisbane Rugby League
- Duration: March 22 – September 21, 1980
- Teams: 8
- Premiers: Northern Suburbs
- Minor premiers: Fortitude Valley
- Matches played: 88
- Points scored: 3116
- Top points scorer(s): Mal Meninga (245)
- Player of the year: Peter Lehman (Rothmans Medal)
- Top try-scorer(s): Bruce Astill (19)

The 1980 Brisbane Rugby League premiership was the 73rd season of Brisbane's professional rugby league football competition. Eight teams from across Brisbane competed for the premiership, which culminated in a grand final match at Lang Park between Northern Suburbs (Norths) and Southern Suburbs (Souths).

== Season summary ==
Teams played each other three times, with 21 rounds of competition played.
It resulted in a top four of Southern Suburbs, Fortitude Valley, Northern Suburbs and Past Brothers Brisbane.

=== Teams ===
Club	Home ground	Coach	Captain
Eastern Suburbs	Langlands Park	John Abbott	John Abbott
Fortitude Valley	Neumann Oval	Ross Strudwick	Ross Strudwick
Northern Suburbs	Bishop Park	Graham Lowe	Mark Murray
Past Brothers	Corbett Park	Wayne Bennett	Greg Holben
Redcliffe	Dolphin Oval	Frank Stanton	Ian Pearce
Southern Suburbs	Davies Park	Bob McCarthy	Bruce Astill
Western Suburbs	Purtell Park	Harry Cameron	Norm Carr
Wynnum-Manly	Kougari Oval	Henry Holloway	Des Morris

=== Ladder ===
	Team	Pld	W	D	L	PF	PA	PD	Pts
1	Fortitude Valley	21	16	0	5	452	261	+191	32
2	Southern Suburbs	21	15	1	5	434	257	+177	31
3	Past Brothers	21	14	0	7	342	326	+16	28
4	Northern Suburbs (P)	21	13	0	8	380	314	+66	26
5	Redcliffe	21	11	1	9	429	368	+61	23
6	Eastern Suburbs	21	6	0	15	404	432	-28	12
7	Wynnum-Manly	21	4	1	16	328	523	-195	9
8	Western Suburbs	21	3	1	17	209	497	-288	7

== Finals ==
Home	Score	Away	Match Information
Home	Score	Away	Date and Time	Venue	Referee	Crowd
Semi-finals
Northern Suburbs	24-17	Past Brothers	31 August 1980	Lang Park	Eddie Ward
Southern Suburbs	22-14	Fortitude Valley	7 September 1980	Lang Park	Eddie Ward
Preliminary Final
Northern Suburbs	15-14	Fortitude Valley	14 September 1980	Lang Park	Eddie Ward
Grand Final
Northern Suburbs	17-15	Southern Suburbs	21 September 1980	Lang Park	Eddie Ward	32,000

== Grand Final ==
The Grand Final, attended by over 32,000 people, was most notable for a fight which occurred in the first half of the match. Spectators cheered while a commentator was quoted as saying "that's as bad as I've seen in a Grand Final." When play resumed, a close game finished with Norths winning 17-15.

Northern Suburbs 17 (Tries: R. Henrick, B. Dunn, P. Dutton. Goals: G. Warnock 4.)

Southern Suburbs 15 (Tries: M. Meninga, G. Moroko, B. Johnstone. Goals: M. Meninga 3.)
