= 1989 Brisbane Rugby League season =

Rugby League in Brisbane

Brisbane Rugby League
- Sport: Rugby league
- Number of teams: 8
- Country: Australia
- Premiers: Fortitude Valley

The 1989 Brisbane Rugby League season was the 68th season of semi-professional top level rugby league in Brisbane, Queensland, Australia.

== Teams ==
Club	Home ground	Coach	Captain
Eastern Suburbs	Langlands Park	Des Morris	Ian Stains
Fortitude Valley	Neumann Oval	Ross Henrick	Steve Hegarty
Ipswich	North Ipswich Reserve	Jim Landy	Steve Parcell
Logan	Meakin Park	Bob Tronc	Paul Vardy
Northern Suburbs	Bishop Park	Greg Oliphant	Michael Booth
Past Brothers	Corbett Park		
Redcliffe	Dolphin Oval	Graham Olling	
Southern Suburbs	Davies Park	Geoff Naylor	Greg Minton
Western Suburbs	Purtell Park	Barry Muir	Kevin Langer
Wynnum-Manly	Kougari Oval	Brian Walsh	Doug Belford

== Final ==
Fortitude Valley 28 (S. Buckley 2, M. Fiechtner 2, Z. Strasser tries; S. Hegarty 4 goals) defeated Ipswich 4 (S. Smith try) at Lang Park.
