= 1988 Brisbane Rugby League season =

Rugby league in Brisbane

Brisbane Rugby League
- Sport: Rugby league
- Number of teams: 8
- Country: Australia
- Premiers: Fortitude Valley-Tweed

The 1988 Brisbane Rugby League premiership was the 67th season of Brisbane's semi-professional rugby league football competition. Eight teams from across Brisbane competed for the premiership, which culminated in a grand final match between the Fortitude Valley-Tweed and Ipswich clubs.

== Season summary ==
A new team, the Logan Scorpions, were admitted to the competition, bringing its total to ten teams. Teams played each other three times, with 21 rounds of competition played. It resulted in a top five of Southern Suburbs, Eastern Suburbs, Seagulls-Diehards and Ipswich.

=== Teams ===
Club	Home ground	Coach	Captain
Eastern Suburbs	Langlands Park	Des Morris	
Fortitude Valley-Tweed	Neumann Oval	Ross Henrick	Peter Coyne
Ipswich	North Ipswich Reserve	Tommy Raudonikis	
Logan	Meakin Park	John Barber	
Northern Suburbs	Bishop Park	Greg Oliphant	
Past Brothers Brisbane	Corbett Park	Greg Holben	
Redcliffe	Dolphin Oval	Graham Olling	
Southern Suburbs	Davies Park	Geoff Naylor	
Western Suburbs	Purtell Park	Barry Muir	
Wynnum-Manly	Kougari Oval	John Dowling	

=== Ladder ===
	Team	Pld	W	D	L	PF	PA	PD	Pts
1	Southern Suburbs	18	13	0	5	358	314	+44	26
2	Fortitude Valley-Tweed	18	11	1	6	431	322	+109	23
3	Ipswich	18	11	1	6	365	275	+90	23
4	Eastern Suburbs	18	10	1	7	394	277	+117	21
5	Past Brothers Brisbane	18	9	2	7	283	244	+39	20
6	Northern Suburbs	18	9	1	8	317	277	+40	19
7	Western Suburbs	18	9	1	8	240	287	-47	19
8	Redcliffe	18	8	0	10	306	276	+30	16
9	Wynnum-Manly	18	4	0	14	230	409	-179	8
10	Logan	18	2	1	15	202	425	-223	5

== Finals ==
Home	Score	Away	Match Information
Home	Score	Away	Date and Time	Venue	Referee	Crowd
Semi-finals
Ipswich	11-10	Eastern; Suburbs	28 August 1988	Lang Park
Fortitude Valley- Tweed	25-14	Southern; Suburbs	4 September 1988	Lang Park
Preliminary Final
Southern; Suburbs	6-20	Ipswich	10 September 1988	Lang Park
Grand Final
Fortitude Valley- Tweed	17-14	Ipswich	18 September 1988	Lang Park
