= 1984 Brisbane Rugby League season =

1984 Brisbane Rugby League
- Duration: March 2 – September 30, 1984
- Teams: 8
- Premiers: Wynnum-Manly
- Minor premiers: Wynnum-Manly
- Matches played: 89
- Points scored: 3151
- Top points scorer: Mal Meninga (154)
- Player of the year: Cavill Heugh (Rothmans Medal)
- Top try-scorer: Mal Meninga (18)

The 1984 Brisbane Rugby League premiership was the 76th season of Brisbane's professional rugby league football competition. Eight teams from across Brisbane competed for the premiership, which culminated in a grand final match between the Wynnum-Manly and Southern Suburbs clubs.

== Season summary ==
Though the format in which games of the 1984 BRL season were played did not change from the previous year, competition points were given to the eight Brisbane teams based on wins in the Woolworths Pre-Season Competition and the 3 games each club played against another Brisbane side in the Winfield State League, excluding finals in both of these competitions. These matches effectively formed Rounds 1-7 of the 1984 Winfield Cup, with media at the time referring to the May-September Brisbane competition as Rounds 8-21 once again.

Teams played each other a total of three times over the 21 first-grade rounds, twice during the regular competition and once during either the pre-season or state league. It resulted in a top four of Wynnum-Manly, Southern Suburbs, Fortitude Valley and Redcliffe.

=== Teams ===
| Club | Home ground | Coach | Captain |
|---|---|---|---|
| Eastern Suburbs | Langlands Park | John Lang | Larry Brigginshaw |
| Fortitude Valley | Neumann Oval | Ross Strudwick | Russell Klein |
| Northern Suburbs | Bishop Park | Barry Muir | ~~Paul Bartier~~ → Dennis Cook |
| Past Brothers | Corbett Park | Tommy Raudonikis | Pat Shepherdson |
| Redcliffe | Dolphin Oval | John Barber | Mitch Brennan |
| Southern Suburbs | Davies Park | Wayne Bennett | ~~Bruce Astill~~ → Mal Meninga |
| Western Suburbs | Purtell Park | Greg Oliphant | Norm Carr |
| Wynnum-Manly | Kougari Oval | Des Morris | David Green |

=== Results ===
| Team | P1 | P2 | P3 | P4 | ST1 | ST2 | ST3 | ST4 | ST5 | ST6 | 8 | 9 | 10 | 11 | 12 | 13 | 14 | 15 | WT | 16 | 17 | 18 | 19 | 20 | 21 | PF | F1 | F2 | GF |
|---|---|---|---|---|---|---|---|---|---|---|---|---|---|---|---|---|---|---|---|---|---|---|---|---|---|---|---|---|---|
| Eastern Suburbs Tigers | BRO -34 | RED -3 | NOR +24 | VAL -12 | WST -2 | Y | SOU -12 | WYN -22 | Y | Y | BRO +23 | RED 0 | NOR +18 | VAL +5 | WST +28 | SOU -8 | WYN -32 | BRO 0 | X | RED +8 | NOR 0 | VAL +8 | WST +6 | SOU -30 | WYN -4 | | | | |
| Fortitude Valley Diehards | SOU -26 | WYN -7 | WST +4 | EST +12 | BRO +2 | Y | Y | NOR +28 | RED +1 | Y | SOU +4 | WYN -12 | WST +2 | EST -5 | BRO +8 | NOR +16 | RED -18 | SOU +2 | X | WYN -22 | WST +12 | EST -8 | BRO -28 | NOR +18 | RED +8 | X | RED +2 | SOU -6 | |
| Northern Suburbs Devils | RED -6 | BRO -18 | EST -24 | WST -14 | Y | WYN -14 | Y | VAL -28 | Y | SOU -46 | RED -33 | BRO -8 | EST -18 | WST -22 | WYN -6 | VAL -16 | SOU 0 | RED +2 | X | BRO -10 | EST 0 | WST +18 | WYN +6 | VAL -18 | SOU -22 | | | | |
| Past Brothers | EST +34 | NOR +18 | RED -3 | SOU -10 | VAL -2 | Y | WST -2 | Y | Y | WYN -36 | EST -23 | NOR +8 | RED +2 | SOU +7 | VAL -8 | WYN -22 | WST +8 | EST 0 | X | NOR +10 | RED +4 | SOU -6 | VAL +28 | WYN -6 | WST +16 | RED -11 | | | |
| Redcliffe Dolphins | NOR +6 | EST +3 | BRO +3 | WYN -6 | Y | SOU -3 | Y | Y | VAL -1 | WST +4 | NOR +33 | EST 0 | BRO -2 | WYN -8 | SOU -8 | WST +32 | VAL +18 | NOR -2 | X | EST -8 | BRO -4 | WYN -8 | SOU +6 | WST +26 | VAL -8 | BRO +11 | VAL -2 | | |
| Southern Suburbs Magpies | VAL +26 | WST +20 | WYN +28 | BRO +10 | Y | RED +3 | EST +12 | Y | Y | NOR +46 | VAL -4 | WST +32 | WYN -12 | BRO -7 | RED +8 | EST +8 | NOR 0 | VAL -2 | WYN -22 | WST +2 | X | BRO +6 | RED -6 | EST +30 | NOR +22 | X | WYN -24 | VAL +6 | WYN -34 |
| Western Suburbs Panthers | WYN -8 | SOU -20 | VAL -4 | NOR +14 | EST +2 | Y | BRO +2 | Y | Y | RED -4 | WYN +16 | SOU -32 | VAL -2 | NOR +22 | EST -28 | RED -32 | BRO -8 | WYN -43 | X | SOU -2 | VAL -12 | NOR -18 | EST -6 | RED -26 | BRO -16 | | | | |
| Wynnum-Manly Seagulls | WST +8 | VAL +7 | SOU -28 | RED +6 | Y | NOR +14 | Y | EST +22 | Y | BRO +36 | WST -16 | VAL +12 | SOU +12 | RED +8 | NOR +6 | BRO +22 | EST +32 | WST +43 | SOU +22 | VAL +22 | X | RED +8 | NOR -6 | BRO +6 | EST +4 | X | SOU +24 | X | SOU +34 |
| Team | P1 | P2 | P3 | P4 | ST1 | ST2 | ST3 | ST4 | ST5 | ST6 | 8 | 9 | 10 | 11 | 12 | 13 | 14 | 15 | WT | 16 | 17 | 18 | 19 | 20 | 21 | PF | F1 | F2 | GF |

- X - Bye
- Y - Team played a non-first grade State League match
- Opponent for round listed above margin

=== Ladder ===
| | Team | Pld | W | D | L | PF | PA | PD | Pts |
|---|---|---|---|---|---|---|---|---|---|
| 1 | Wynnum-Manly (P) | 21 | 18 | 0 | 3 | 524 | 280 | +244 | 36 |
| 2 | Southern Suburbs | 21 | 14 | 1 | 6 | 479 | 279 | +200 | 27 |
| 3 | Fortitude Valley | 21 | 12 | 0 | 9 | 313 | 338 | -25 | 24 |
| 4 | Redcliffe | 21 | 10 | 1 | 10 | 400 | 315 | +85 | 21 |
| 5 | Past Brothers | 21 | 10 | 1 | 10 | 372 | 355 | +17 | 21 |
| 6 | Eastern Suburbs | 21 | 8 | 3 | 10 | 368 | 407 | -39 | 19 |
| 7 | Western Suburbs | 21 | 5 | 0 | 16 | 212 | 417 | -205 | 10 |
| 8 | Northern Suburbs | 21 | 3 | 2 | 16 | 278 | 555 | -277 | 8 |

== Finals ==
| Home | Score | Away | Match information |
| Home | Score | Away | Date and time | Venue | Referee | Crowd |
|---|---|---|---|---|---|---|
Playoff
| Redcliffe | 22-11 | Past Brothers | 5 September 1984 | Lang Park |
Semi-finals
| Fortitude Valley | 18-16 | Redcliffe | 9 September 1984 | Lang Park | David Manson |
| Wynnum-Manly | 46-22 | Southern Suburbs | 16 September 1984 | Lang Park | Eddie Ward | 13,500 |
Preliminary Final
| Fortitude Valley | 8-14 | Southern Suburbs | 22 September 1984 | Lang Park | David Manson |
Grand Final
| Wynnum-Manly | 42-8 | Southern Suburbs | 30 September 1984 | Lang Park | David Manson | 25,000 |

== Grand Final ==
Wynnum-Manly 42 (Tries: D. Green 2, W. Green, B. French, B. Walsh, W. Lewis, G. Miles, G. Dowling. Goals: W. Green 5.)

Southern Suburbs 8 (Tries: H. Abbott. Goals: M. Meninga 2.)

== Winfield State League ==
The 1984 Winfield State League was the third season of the Queensland Rugby League's statewide competition. A total of 14 teams competed in the season, 8 of which were BRL Premiership clubs. The remaining six were regional teams from across the state, hence the State League name. The finals were straight final four series held at QRL headquarters at Lang Park, with Wynnum-Manly and Souths winning their respective semi finals. In the final, the Seagulls defeated Magpies 21-10 to win the first of four straight Winfield State League titles.

1984 Winfield State League Final

1984

| Wynnum Manly | 23-15 | Southern Suburbs |

Lang Park
