= 1981 Brisbane Rugby League season =

1981 Brisbane Rugby League
- Duration: March 28 – September 20, 1981
- Teams: 8
- Premiers: Southern Suburbs
- Minor premiers: Southern Suburbs
- Matches played: 88
- Points scored: 2858
- Top points scorer(s): Shane McNally (200)
- Player of the year: Chris Phelan (Rothmans Medal)
- Top try-scorer(s): Bruce Astill (15)

The 1981 Brisbane Rugby League premiership was the 74th season of Brisbane's professional rugby league football competition. Eight teams from across Brisbane competed for the premiership, which culminated in a grand final match between the Southern Suburbs and Redcliffe clubs.

== Season summary ==
Teams played each other three times, with 21 rounds of competition played. It resulted in a top four of Redcliffe, Southern Suburbs, Wynnum-Manly and Eastern Suburbs.

=== Teams ===
Club	Home ground	Coach	Captain
Eastern Suburbs	Langlands Park	John Lang	Greg Holben
Fortitude Valley	Neumann Oval	Ross Strudwick	Ross Strudwick
Northern Suburbs	Bishop Park	Graham Lowe	Mark Murray
Past Brothers	Corbett Park	Wayne Bennett	Jay Hoffman
Redcliffe	Dolphin Oval	Arthur Beetson	Arthur Beetson
Southern Suburbs	Davies Park	Bob McCarthy	Bruce Astill
Western Suburbs	Purtell Park	John Lohman	Norm Carr
Wynnum-Manly	Kougari Oval	Des Morris	Des Morris

=== Ladder ===
	Team	Pld	W	D	L	PF	PA	PD	Pts
1	Southern Suburbs (P)	21	14	1	6	352	147	+205	29
2	Redcliffe	21	14	0	7	413	274	+139	28
3	Wynnum-Manly	21	14	0	7	410	382	+28	28
4	Eastern Suburbs	21	11	0	10	411	307	-104	22
5	Fortitude Valley	21	10	1	10	308	305	+3	21
6	Northern Suburbs	21	8	0	13	270	396	-126	16
7	Western Suburbs	21	6	1	14	275	415	-140	13
8	Past Brothers	21	5	1	15	309	422	-113	11

== Finals ==
Home	Score	Away	Match Information
Home	Score	Away	Date and Time	Venue	Referee	Crowd
Semi-finals
Wynnum-Manly	20-9	Eastern Suburbs	30 August 1981	Lang Park	Eddie Ward
Redcliffe	21-10	Southern Suburbs	6 September 1981	Lang Park	Stan Scamp
Preliminary Final
Southern Suburbs	16-12	Wynnum-Manly	13 September 1981	Lang Park	Eddie Ward
Grand Final
Redcliffe	9-13	Southern Suburbs	20 September 1981	Lang Park	Stan Scamp	30,000

== Grand Final ==
Southern Suburbs 13 (Tries: B. Sully, M. Reardon. Goals: M. Meninga 3. Field Goal: K. Spencer.)

Redcliffe 9 (Tries: I. Pearce. Goals: I. Pearce 3.)
