= 1977 Brisbane Rugby League season =

1977 Brisbane Rugby League
- Duration: March 25 – September 18, 1977
- Teams: 8
- Premiers: Eastern Suburbs
- Minor premiers: Redcliffe Dolphins
- Matches played: 89
- Points scored: 2898
- Player of the year: Alan Currie (Rothmans Medal)

The 1977 Brisbane Rugby League season was the 70th season of the Brisbane Rugby League premiership. Eight rugby league teams from across Brisbane competed for the premiership, which culminated in a grand final match between the Eastern Suburbs and Redcliffe clubs.

== Season summary ==
Teams played each other three times, with 21 rounds of competition played. It resulted in a top four of Eastern Suburbs, Western Suburbs, Northern Suburbs and Redcliffe.

=== Teams ===
Club	Home ground	Coach	Captain
Eastern Suburbs	Langlands Park	Des Morris	Des Morris
Fortitude Valley	Neumann Oval	Johnny Rhodes	Ross Strudwick
Northern Suburbs	Bishop Park	Bob Bax	Bruce Warwick
Past Brothers	Corbett Park	John Lohman	David Wright
Redcliffe	Redcliffe Showgrounds	Ian Pearce	Ian Pearce
Southern Suburbs	Davies Park	Wayne Bennett	Wayne Bennett
Western Suburbs	Purtell Park	Ron Raper	Bob Green
Wynnum-Manly	Kougari Oval	Dennis Ward	Dennis Ward

=== Ladder ===
	Team	Pld	W	D	L	PF	PA	PD	Pts
1	Redcliffe	21	14	0	7	339	237	+102	28
2	Western Suburbs	21	12	0	9	383	331	+52	24
3	Eastern Suburbs (P)	21	11	0	10	378	323	+55	22
4	Northern Suburbs	21	11	0	10	414	401	+11	22
5	Past Brothers	21	11	0	10	301	341	-40	22
6	Fortitude Valley	21	9	0	12	380	363	+17	18
7	Wynnum-Manly	21	9	0	12	259	376	-117	18
8	Southern Suburbs	21	7	0	14	328	410	-82	14

== Finals ==
Home	Score	Away	Match information
Home	Score	Away	Date and time	Venue	Referee	Crowd
Playoff
Northern Suburbs	21-10	Past Brothers	23 August 1977	Lang Park	Stan Scamp
Semi-finals
Eastern Suburbs	21-11	Northern Suburbs	28 August 1977	Lang Park	Ian Smith
Redcliffe	5-4	Western Suburbs	4 September 1977	Lang Park	Eddie Ward
Preliminary Final
Eastern Suburbs	9-5	Western Suburbs	11 September 1977	Lang Park	R. Thomas
Grand Final
Eastern Suburbs	17-13	Redcliffe	18 September 1977	Lang Park	Eddie Ward	37,000

== Grand Final ==
Eastern Suburbs 17 (Tries: John Callus, Steve Farquhar, Wayne Lindenburg. Goals: Greg Holben 4)

Redcliffe 13 (Tries: Forrester Grayson. Goals: Ian Pierce 5)
