= 1994 Brisbane Rugby League season =

Rugby League in Brisbane

Brisbane Rugby League
- Sport: Rugby league
- Number of teams: 8
- Country: Australia
- Premiers: Western Suburbs

The 1994 Brisbane Rugby League season was the 74th season of semi-professional top level rugby league in Brisbane, Queensland, Australia. The season was the final campaign for the competition as an official top-tier rugby league competition.

== Teams ==
Club	Home ground	Coach	Captain
Brisbane Broncos (Reserve Grade)	QEII Stadium		
Eastern Suburbs Tigers	Langlands Park		
Fortitude Valley Diehards	Neumann Oval		
Ipswich Jets	North Ipswich Reserve		
Logan Scorpions	Meakin Park		
Northern Suburbs Devils	Bishop Park		
Past/Brisbane Brothers Leprechauns	Corbett Park		
Redcliffe Dolphins	Dolphin Oval		
South Queensland Crushers (Reserve Grade)	Lang Park		
Southern Suburbs Magpies	Davies Park		
Western Suburbs Panthers	Purtell Park		
Wynnum Manly Seagulls	Kougari Oval		

== Final ==
Redcliffe 24 (R. McGrady, G. Adamason, B. Pike, A. Schick tries; W. Miller 4 goals) defeated Western Suburbs 18 (S. Smith, S. Vivian, M. Maguire tries; M. Maguire 3 goals) at Lang Park.
