= Ian Pearce =

Ian Pearce may refer to:

- Ian Pearce (footballer) (born 1974), English footballer
- Ian Pearce (rugby league) (1947–1993), Australian professional rugby league footballer and coach

== See also ==
- Ian Pierce, pseudonym of John Jughead Pierson (fl. 1980s–2010s), American musician, writer, actor, and podcaster
