= 1969 Brisbane Rugby League season =

The 1969 Brisbane Rugby League season was the 61st season of the Brisbane Rugby League premiership. Eight teams from across Brisbane competed for the premiership, which culminated in Northern Suburbs defeating Fortitude Valley 14–2 in the grand final.

This was the Norths' 8th premiership in an 11-year span and the 8th occasion the BRL grand final featured a Norths-Valleys match up.

== Ladder ==
	Team	Pld	W	D	L	PF	PA	PD	Pts
1	Northern Suburbs	21	16	0	5	335	205	+130	32
2	Fortitude Valley	21	13	1	7	343	271	+72	27
3	Western Suburbs	21	12	1	8	343	278	+65	25
4	Eastern Suburbs	21	11	2	8	319	268	+51	24
5	Past Brothers	21	11	1	9	388	290	+98	23
6	Wynnum-Manly	21	8	1	12	287	364	-77	17
7	Redcliffe	21	6	1	14	272	354	-82	13
8	Southern Suburbs	21	4	1	16	214	471	-257	9

== Finals ==
Home	Score	Away	Match Information
Home	Score	Away	Date and Time	Venue	Referee	Crowd
Semi-finals
Western Suburbs	23-13	Eastern Suburbs	30 August 1969	Lang Park	Henry Albert
Northern Suburbs	16-14	Fortitude Valley	31 August 1969	Lang Park	Don Lancashire
Preliminary Final
Fortitude Valley	17-14	Western Suburbs	6 September 1969	Lang Park	Don Lancashire	20,000
Grand Final
Northern Suburbs	14-2	Fortitude Valley	13 September 1969	Lang Park	Don Lancashire	34,752

== Grand Final ==
Northern Suburbs 14 (Tries: Metassa, Massie, Goals: Gordon 3, Field Goals: Spring)

Fortitude Valley 2 (Goals: Clarke)
