= 1990 Brisbane Rugby League season =

Rugby League in Brisbane

Brisbane Rugby League
- Sport: Rugby league
- Number of teams: 8
- Country: Australia
- Premiers: Fortitude Valley

The 1990 Brisbane Rugby League season was the 69th season of semi-professional top level rugby league in Brisbane, Queensland, Australia.

== Teams ==
Club	Home ground	Coach	Captain
Eastern Suburbs	Langlands Park		
Fortitude Valley	Neumann Oval	Ross Henrick	Bill Holmes
Ipswich	North Ipswich Reserve	Jim Landy	Steve Parcell
Logan	Meakin Park		
Northern Suburbs	Bishop Park	Tommy Raudonikis	
Past Brothers	Corbett Park		
Redcliffe	Dolphin Oval		
Southern Suburbs	Davies Park		
Western Suburbs	Purtell Park		
Wynnum-Manly	Kougari Oval		

== Final ==
Fortitude Valley 17 (P. Shields, M. Fiechtner, P. Coyne tries; P. Coyne 2 goals; P. Coyne field goal) defeated Northern Suburbs 16 (I. McKenzie, T. Evans tries; G Harvey 4 goals) at Lang Park.

=== Brawl ===
Early in the first half, a major brawl broke out between the two sides after a couple of heavy tackles. The fight initially seemed to calm before rapidly escalating and splintering into smaller fights. One of particular note was between Valleys winger Peter Shields and Norths threequarter Brad Foster, which saw the two trade blows toe to toe, and both lose their jerseys as a result.

The fight was so ferocious that the scoreboard attendant displayed 'break it up lads' on the scoreboard, whilst there were two fight calls reputed as being triggered most likely by renowned Norths coach Tommy Raudonikis, with these being "99" and "ANZAC" respectively.
