= 1991 Brisbane Rugby League season =

Brisbane Rugby League
- Sport: Rugby league
- Number of teams: 8
- Country: Australia
- Premiers: Eastern Suburbs

The 1991 Brisbane Rugby League season was the 70th season of semi-professional top level rugby league in Brisbane, Queensland, Australia.

== Teams ==
Club	Home ground	Coach	Captain
Eastern Suburbs	Langlands Park		
Fortitude Valley	Neumann Oval		
Ipswich	North Ipswich Reserve	Jim Landy	Steve Parcell
Logan	Meakin Park		
Northern Suburbs	Bishop Park	Tommy Raudonikis	
Past Brothers	Corbett Park		
Redcliffe	Dolphin Oval		
Southern Suburbs	Davies Park		
Western Suburbs	Purtell Park		
Wynnum-Manly	Kougari Oval		

== Final ==
Eastern Suburbs 25 (K.Wrigley, S. Dowden, A. Neave ties; K. Jackson 4 goals; K. Jackson field goal) defeated Western Suburbs 10 (P. Weaver, C. Bowen ties; G. Duncan goal) at Lang Park.
