= 1993 Brisbane Rugby League season =

Rugby League in Brisbane

Brisbane Rugby League
- Sport: Rugby league
- Number of teams: 8
- Country: Australia
- Premiers: Western Suburbs

The 1993 Brisbane Rugby League season was the 72nd season of semi-professional top level rugby league in Brisbane, Queensland, Australia.

== Teams ==
Club	Home ground	Coach	Captain
Eastern Suburbs	Langlands Park		
Valleys-Tweed	Neumann Oval		
Ipswich	Briggs Road Sporting Complex	Kevin Langer	Kevin Langer
Logan	Meakin Park		
Northern Suburbs	Bishop Park		
Past Brothers	Corbett Park		
Redcliffe	Dolphin Oval		
Southern Suburbs	Davies Park		
Western Suburbs	Purtell Park		
Wynnum-Manly	Kougari Oval		

== Regular season ==
Easts Tigers halfback Paul Green won the Rothmans Medal for the best and fairest player in the competition.

== Final ==
Western Suburbs 18 (Tries: M. Maguire 2, D. Mills 2; Goal G. Kerr) def. Eastern Suburbs 12 (Tries: P. Green, P. Sinclair; Goals: R. Cannon, P. Green) at Lang Park.
