= 1983 Brisbane Rugby League season =

1983 Brisbane Rugby League
- Duration: May 22 – September 18, 1983
- Teams: 8
- Premiers: Eastern Suburbs
- Minor premiers: Redcliffe Dolphins
- Matches played: 61
- Points scored: 2140
- Top points scorer(s): Shane McNally (152)
- Player of the year: Trevor Paterson (Rothmans Medal)
- Top try-scorer(s): Mitch Brennan (14)

The 1983 Brisbane Rugby League premiership was the 75th season of Brisbane's professional rugby league football competition. Eight teams from across Brisbane competed for the premiership, which culminated in a grand final match between the Eastern Suburbs and Redcliffe clubs.

== Season summary ==
Teams played each other twice, with 14 rounds of competition played. It resulted in a top four of Eastern Suburbs, Redcliffe, Fortitude Valley, Southern Suburbs.

=== Teams ===
Club	Home ground	Coach	Captain
Eastern Suburbs	Langlands Park	John Lang	Larry Brigginshaw
Fortitude Valley	Neumann Oval	Ross Strudwick	Wally Lewis
Northern Suburbs	Bishop Park	Barry Muir	Greg Conescu
Past Brothers	Corbett Park	Tommy Raudonikis	Tommy Raudonikis
Redcliffe	Dolphin Oval	John Barber	Mark Murray
Southern Suburbs	Davies Park	Bob McCarthy	Bruce Astill
Western Suburbs	Purtell Park	Ron Raper	Dave Moffett
Wynnum-Manly	Kougari Oval	Des Morris	David Green

=== Ladder ===
	Team	Pld	W	D	L	PF	PA	PD	Pts
1	Redcliffe	14	10	1	3	262	175	+87	21
2	Eastern Suburbs (P)	14	10	0	4	334	224	+110	20
3	Southern Suburbs	14	9	0	5	286	227	+59	18
4	Wynnum-Manly	14	7	1	6	335	305	+30	15
5	Fortitude Valley	14	7	1	6	214	214	+0	15
6	Past Brothers	14	4	1	9	192	297	-105	9
7	Northern Suburbs	14	4	0	10	205	291	-86	8
8	Western Suburbs	14	3	0	11	156	251	-95	6

== Finals ==
Home	Score	Away	Match Information
Home	Score	Away	Date and Time	Venue	Referee	Crowd
Playoff
Wynnum-Manly	8-22	Fortitude Valley	24 August 1983	Lang Park
Semi-finals
Fortitude Valley	30-22	Southern Suburbs	28 August 1983	Lang Park	Harry Dearness	11,500
Eastern Suburbs	11-5	Redcliffe	4 September 1983	Lang Park	Eddie Ward
Preliminary Final
Fortitude Valley	10-28	Redcliffe	11 September 1983	Lang Park	Eddie Ward
Grand Final
Eastern Suburbs	14-6	Redcliffe	18 September 1983	Lang Park	Eddie Ward	25,000

== Grand Final ==
Eastern Suburbs 14 (Tries: B. Tengdahl, B. Backer. Goals: S. McNally 3.)

Redcliffe 6 (Tries: S. Cherry. Goals: J. Chapman.)

== Winfield State League ==
The 1983 Winfield State League was the second season of the Queensland Rugby League's statewide competition. A total of 14 teams competed in the inaugural season, 8 of which were BRL Premiership clubs. The remaining six were regional teams from across the state, hence the State League name. Fortitude Valley won the title with a 21-12 win over Easts Tigers in the final at Lang Park in Brisbane.

1983 Winfield State League Final

1983

Fortitude Valley	21-12	Eastern Suburbs

Lang Park
