= 1992 Brisbane Rugby League season =

Rugby League in Brisbane

Brisbane Rugby League
- Sport: Rugby league
- Number of teams: 8
- Country: Australia
- Premiers: Western Suburbs

The 1992 Brisbane Rugby League season was the 71st season of semi-professional top level rugby league in Brisbane, Queensland, Australia.

== Teams ==
| Club | Home ground | Coach | Captain |
|---|---|---|---|
| Eastern Suburbs | Langlands Park | John Lang | |
| Fortitude Valley | Neumann Oval | Geoff Naylor | |
| Ipswich | North Ipswich Reserve | Ken Coles | |
| Logan | Meakin Park | | |
| Northern Suburbs | Bishop Park | Dave Brown | |
| Past Brothers | Corbett Park | | |
| Redcliffe | Dolphin Oval | | |
| Southern Suburbs | Davies Park | | |
| Western Suburbs | Purtell Park | | |
| Wynnum-Manly | Kougari Oval | Gary Seaton | |

== Final ==
Western Suburbs 40 (J. Green 2, G. Sutton 2, S. Smith, G. Duncan, P. Schuler tries; J. Green 6 goals) defeated Eastern Suburbs 10 (P. Anderson, G. Street tires; G. Payne goal) at Lang Park.
