= 1970 Brisbane Rugby League season =

1970 Brisbane Rugby League
- Teams: 8
- Premiers: Fortitude Valley
- Minor premiers: Past Brothers

The 1970 Brisbane Rugby League season was the 62nd season of the Brisbane Rugby League premiership. Eight teams from across Brisbane competed for the premiership, which culminated in Fortitude Valley defeating Northern Suburbs 13–11 in the grand final, ending Valleys' 13-year premiership drought. Southern Suburbs' Graeme Atherton was named the Rothmans Medalist (Best and Fairest) - the first Southern Suburbs player to win the award.

== Ladder ==
	Team	Pld	W	D	L	PF	PA	PD	Pts
1	Past Brothers	21	16	0	5	404	265	+139	32
2	Northern Suburbs	21	14	2	5	418	233	+185	30
3	Southern Suburbs	21	13	0	8	401	337	+64	26
4	Fortitude Valley	21	12	1	8	378	299	+79	25
5	Western Suburbs	21	12	0	9	358	278	+80	24
6	Eastern Suburbs	21	7	0	14	304	295	+9	14
7	Redcliffe	21	5	1	15	251	402	-151	11
8	Wynnum-Manly	21	3	0	18	257	562	-305	6

== Finals ==
Home	Score	Away	Match Information
Home	Score	Away	Date and Time	Venue	Referee	Crowd
Semi-finals
Fortitude Valley	41-9	Southern Suburbs	29 August 1970	Lang Park	Henry Albert
Northern Suburbs	12-4	Past Brothers	30 August 1970	Lang Park	Ron Mison	25,000
Preliminary Final
Fortitude Valley	15-7	Past Brothers	6 September 1970	Lang Park	Bob Ward	17,392
Grand Final
Fortitude Valley	13-11	Northern Suburbs	12 September 1970	Lang Park	Bob Ward	30,000
