= 1936 Brisbane Rugby League season =

Season of rugby league competition

1936 Brisbane Rugby League
- Teams: 6
- Premiers: Western Suburbs (3rd title)
- Minor premiers: Fortitude Valley (4th title)
- Wooden spoon: Southern Suburbs (5th spoon)

The 1936 Brisbane Rugby League premiership was the 28th season of Brisbane's semi-professional rugby league football competition. Six teams from across Brisbane competed for the premiership. The season culminated in Western Suburbs defeating Fortitude Valley 13-12 in the grand final.

== Ladder ==
	Team	Pld	W	D	L	PF	PA	PD	Pts
1	Fortitude Valley	10	7	0	3	180	94	+86	14
2	Western Suburbs	10	7	0	3	199	126	+73	14
3	Northern Suburbs	10	6	0	4	174	133	+41	12
4	Eastern Suburbs	10	5	0	5	124	153	-29	10
5	Past Brothers	10	4	0	6	113	151	-38	8
6	Southern Suburbs	10	1	0	9	107	250	-143	2

== Finals ==
Home	Score	Away	Match Information
Home	Score	Away	Date and Time	Venue	Reference
Semifinals
Northern Suburbs	24-11	Eastern Suburbs	22 August 1936	Brisbane Cricket Ground
Western Suburbs	11-5	Fortitude Valley	29 August 1936	Brisbane Cricket Ground
Preliminary Final
Fortitude Valley	17-11	Northern Suburbs	5 September 1936	Brisbane Cricket Ground
Grand Final
Western Suburbs	13-12	Fortitude Valley	12 September 1936	Brisbane Cricket Ground
