= 1921 Queensland Rugby League season =

Rugby League season

Brisbane Rugby League
- Sport: Rugby league
- Number of teams: 6
- Country: Australia
- Premiers: Carlton

The 1921 Queensland Rugby League premiership was the 13th season of the Queensland rugby league football competition held in Australia. Six teams from across Brisbane competed for the premiership, which culminated in Carlton defeating Coorparoo 12-10 in the grand final.

== Table ==
	Team	Pld	W	D	L	B	Pts
1	Carlton	10	7	1	2	0	15
2	Western Suburbs	10	6	2	2	0	14
3	Fortitude Valley	10	6	0	4	0	12
4	Coorparoo	10	4	1	5	0	9
5	Christian Brothers	10	3	1	6	0	7
6	University Students	10	1	1	8	0	3

== Finals ==
Home	Score	Away	Match information
Home	Score	Away	Date and time	Venue	Referee	Ref
Semifinals
Carlton	8-3	Fortitude Valley	10 September 1921	Davies Park	Laurie Kearney
Coorparoo	22-3	Western Suburbs	10 September 1921	Davies Park
Preliminary Final
Coorparoo	24-18	Carlton	24 September 1921	Davies Park	Laurie Kearney
Grand Final
Carlton	12-10	Coorparoo	1 October 1921	Davies Park	Laurie Kearney

== Grand Final ==
Carlton 12 (Tries: H. Brown, Kelly. Goals: Kelly. Field Goals: Kelly, Stallard

Coorparoo 10 (Tries: Bess, Ehler. Goals: Thorogood
