= 1972 Brisbane Rugby League season =

1972 Brisbane Rugby League
- Teams: 8
- Premiers: Eastern Suburbs
- Minor premiers: Western Suburbs

The 1972 Brisbane Rugby League season was the 64th season of the Brisbane Rugby League premiership. Eight teams from across Brisbane competed for the premiership, which culminated in Eastern Suburbs defeating Fortitude Valley 16–15 in the grand final, winning their first premiership since 1950.

== Ladder ==
	Team	Pld	W	D	L	PF	PA	PD	Pts
1	Western Suburbs	21	17	0	4	497	271	+226	34
2	Eastern Suburbs	21	12	1	8	382	330	+52	25
3	Fortitude Valley	21	12	0	9	301	268	+33	24
4	Past Brothers	21	11	1	9	356	292	+64	23
5	Southern Suburbs	21	11	0	10	391	350	+41	22
6	Northern Suburbs	21	11	0	10	348	306	+42	22
7	Redcliffe	21	7	0	14	275	375	-100	14
8	Wynnum-Manly	21	2	0	18	186	544	-358	4

== Finals ==
Home	Score	Away	Match Information
Home	Score	Away	Date and Time	Venue	Referee
Semi-finals
Fortitude Valley	12-6	Past Brothers	27 August 1972	Lang Park	Bill McKenny
Eastern Suburbs	27-14	Western Suburbs	3 September 1972	Lang Park	Henry Albert
Preliminary Final
Fortitude Valley	20-14	Western Suburbs	10 September 1972	Lang Park	Dale Coogan
Grand Final
Eastern Suburbs	16-15	Fortitude Valley	17 September 1972	Lang Park	Henry Albert
