= 1928 Brisbane Rugby League season =

1928 Brisbane Rugby League
- Teams: 7
- Premiers: University (1st title)
- Minor premiers: Carlton (1st title)
- Wooden spoon: Coorparoo (1st spoon)

The 1928 Brisbane Rugby League premiership was the 20th season of Brisbane's semi-professional rugby league football competition. Seven teams from across Brisbane competed for the premiership. The season culminated in University defeating Carlton 10–7 in the grand final challenge.

== Ladder ==
	Team	Pld	W	D	L	PF	PA	PD	Pts
1	Carlton	12	8	0	4	133	113	+20	16
2	University	12	7	0	5	156	122	+34	14
3	Past Brothers	12	7	0	5	107	88	+19	14
4	Western Suburbs	12	6	0	6	140	155	-15	12
5	Fortitude Valley	12	5	0	7	139	136	+3	10
6	Past Grammars	12	5	0	7	143	162	-19	10
7	Coorparoo	13	4	0	9	79	132	-53	8

== Finals ==
Home	Score	Away	Match Information
Home	Score	Away	Date and Time	Venue	Reference
Semifinals
University	18-6	Carlton	8 September 1928	Brisbane Exhibition Grounds
Past Brothers	12-6	Western Suburbs	8 September 1928	Brisbane Exhibition Grounds
Final
University	9-7	Past Brothers	15 September 1928	Brisbane Exhibition Grounds
Grand Final Challenge
University	10-7	Carlton	22 September 1928	Brisbane Exhibition Grounds
