= 1967 Brisbane Rugby League season =

The 1967 Brisbane Rugby League season was the 59th season of the Brisbane Rugby League premiership. Eight teams from across Brisbane competed for the premiership, which culminated in Past Brothers defeating reigning premiers Northern Suburbs 6–2 in the grand final.

== Ladder ==
	Team	Pld	W	D	L	PF	PA	PD	Pts
1	Fortitude Valley	21	15	2	4	337	230	+107	32
2	Northern Suburbs	21	15	1	5	328	215	+113	31
3	Past Brothers	21	14	0	7	413	251	+162	28
4	Eastern Suburbs	21	11	1	9	313	241	+72	23
5	Western Suburbs	21	9	3	9	289	331	-42	21
6	Redcliffe	21	6	1	14	275	349	-74	13
7	Southern Suburbs	21	5	1	15	265	425	-160	11
8	Wynnum-Manly	21	4	1	16	233	411	-178	9

== Finals ==
Home	Score	Away	Match Information
Home	Score	Away	Date and Time	Venue	Referee	Crowd
Semi-finals
Northern Suburbs	15-12	Fortitude Valley	26 August 1967	Lang Park	Don Lancashire	11,858
Past Brothers	24-7	Eastern Suburbs	27 August 1967	Lang Park	Henry Albert	17,500
Preliminary Final
Past Brothers	12-8	Fortitude Valley	2 September 1967	Lang Park	Ron Harbottle	15,182
Grand Final
Past Brothers	6-2	Northern Suburbs	9 September 1967	Lang Park	Don Lancashire	31,470

== Grand Final ==
Past Brothers 6 (Goals: Cavanagh 3)

Northern Suburbs 2 (Goals: Lobegeiger)
