= Fonda Metassa =

Australian rugby league footballer

Personal information
- Full name: Fonda Metassa
- Born: 19 March 1938
- Died: 26 May 2018 (aged 80)

Playing information
- Position: Three-quarter back
Club
Years	Team	Pld	T	G	FG	P
	Fortitude Valley
1960–61	South Sydney	13	6	0	0	18
	Norths (Brisbane)
	Total	13	6	0	0	18
Representative
Years	Team	Pld	T	G	FG	P
1966	Queensland	1

Fonda Metassa (19 March 1938 – 26 May 2018) was an Australian professional rugby league footballer. Known as "the Golden Greek", he played in the Brisbane Rugby League premiership for Fortitude Valley and Norths, and in the New South Wales Rugby Football League premiership for the South Sydney Rabbitohs in the 1960s.

A powerful winger, Metassa played two seasons (1960 and 1961) for South Sydney. He became a part of Brisbane Rugby League folklore when, in a 1968 reserve grade match for Norths against Souths at Lang Park, he burst from the back of an ambulance to return to the field after being carted off injured. Metassa also played one match for Queensland against Great Britain in 1966. The following season he played in Norths' Brisbane Rugby League grand final loss to Brothers.

Metassa was part of the 1969 BRL premiership-winning Norths side.

He later worked as a television presenter. In 2008, Metassa was named on the wing of an all-time greatest Norths Devils team.
