= 1935 Brisbane Rugby League season =

1935 Brisbane Rugby League
- Teams: 6
- Premiers: Past Brothers (2nd title)
- Minor premiers: Northern Suburbs (1st title)
- Wooden spoon: Southern Suburbs (4th spoon)

The 1935 Brisbane Rugby League premiership was the 27th season of Brisbane's semi-professional rugby league football competition. Six teams from across Brisbane competed for the premiership. The season culminated in Past Brothers defeating Fortitude Valley 11–9 in the grand final.

== Ladder ==
	Team	Pld	W	D	L	PF	PA	PD	Pts
1	Northern Suburbs	10	7	0	3	150	98	+52	14
2	Fortitude Valley	10	7	0	3	196	155	+41	14
3	Past Brothers	10	5	2	3	127	126	+1	12
4	Western Suburbs	10	3	2	5	141	138	+3	8
5	Eastern Suburns	10	3	2	5	125	147	-22	8
6	Southern Suburbs	10	2	0	8	113	187	-74	4

== Finals ==
Home	Score	Away	Match Information
Home	Score	Away	Date and Time	Venue	Reference
Semifinals
Fortitude Valley	22-5	Northern Suburbs	10 September 1935	Brisbane Cricket Ground
Past Brothers	13-5	Western Suburbs	31 September 1935	Brisbane Cricket Ground
Preliminary Final
Past Brothers	14-9	Northern Suburbs	7 September 1935	Brisbane Cricket Ground
Grand Final
Past Brothers	11-9	Fortitude Valley	14 September 1935	Brisbane Cricket Ground
