= 1971 Brisbane Rugby League season =

1971 Brisbane Rugby League
- Teams: 8
- Premiers: Fortitude Valley
- Minor premiers: Fortitude Valley

The 1971 Brisbane Rugby League season was the 63rd season of the Brisbane Rugby League premiership. Eight teams from across Brisbane competed for the premiership, which culminated in Fortitude Valley defeating Eastern Suburbs 18–10 in the grand final in front of a record crowd of 37,957. This was Valleys' third consecutive grand final appearance and their second consecutive premiership.

== Ladder ==
	Team	Pld	W	D	L	PF	PA	PD	Pts
1	Fortitude Valley	21	15	2	4	412	256	+156	32
2	Southern Suburbs	21	14	0	7	434	299	+135	28
3	Eastern Suburbs	21	13	1	7	382	298	+84	27
4	Northern Suburbs	21	12	1	8	316	309	+7	25
5	Western Suburbs	21	9	1	11	378	305	+73	19
6	Past Brothers	21	8	2	11	319	310	+9	18
7	Redcliffe	21	5	2	14	284	404	-120	12
8	Wynnum-Manly	21	3	1	17	263	537	-274	7

== Finals ==
Home	Score	Away	Match Information
Home	Score	Away	Date and Time	Venue	Referee	Crowd
Semi-finals
Eastern Suburbs	21-11	Northern Suburbs	29 August 1971	Lang Park	Henry Albert
Fortitude Valley	12-8	Southern Suburbs	5 September 1971	Lang Park	Ron Mison	20,000
Preliminary Final
Eastern Suburbs	19-11	Southern Suburbs	12 September 1971	Lang Park	Ron Harbottle	24,000
Grand Final
Fortitude Valley	18-10	Eastern Suburbs	19 September 1971	Lang Park	Ron Harbottle	37,957
