= 1931 Brisbane Rugby League season =

Brisbane Rugby League season

1931 Brisbane Rugby League
- Teams: 8
- Premiers: Fortitude Valley (2nd title)
- Minor premiers: Fortitude Valley (3rd title)
- Wooden spoon: Past Brothers (2nd spoon)

The 1931 Brisbane Rugby League premiership was the 23rd season of Brisbane's semi-professional rugby league football competition. Eight teams from across Brisbane competed for the premiership, which culminated in Fortitude Valley defeating Past Grammars (now Norths Devils) 27–9 in the grand final.

== Ladder ==
	Team	Pld	W	D	L	PF	PA	PD	Pts
1	Fortitude Valley	14	9	1	4	229	190	+39	19
2	Southern Suburbs	14	9	0	5	225	180	+45	18
3	Past Grammars	14	8	1	5	191	141	+50	17
4	University Students	14	8	0	6	214	179	+35	16
5	Coorparoo	14	7	1	6	224	204	+20	15
6	Western Suburbs	14	7	1	6	201	154	-47	15
7	Wynnum	14	3	1	9	157	332	-175	7
8	Past Brothers	14	2	1	11	140	269	-129	5

== Finals ==
Home	Score	Away	Match Information
Home	Score	Away	Date and Time	Venue
Semifinals
Carlton	17-5	University Students	5 September 1931	Davies Park
Past Grammars	12-11	Fortitude Valley	5 September 1931	Davies Park
Preliminary Final
Past Grammars	16-13	Carlton	12 September 1931	Brisbane Exhibition Grounds
Grand Final
Fortitude Valley	27-9	Past Grammars	19 September 1931	Davies Park

== Grand Final ==
Fortitude Valley 27 (Tries: Scott, B. Donovan, Martin, Wing 2, Shields. Goals: Shields 3)

Past Grammars 9 (Tries: Morrison. Goals: Holden 3)
