= 1954 Brisbane Rugby League season =

The 1954 Brisbane Rugby League premiership was the 46th season of Brisbane's semi-professional rugby league football competition. The season culminated in Western Suburbs defeating Past Brothers 35–18 in the first grade grand final.

== Table ==
	Team	Pld	W	D	L	PF	PA	PD	Pts
1	Western Suburbs	21	17	0	4	435	244	+191	34
2	Northern Suburbs	21	17	0	4	412	249	+163	34
3	Fortitude Valley	21	14	0	7	322	267	+55	28
4	Past Brothers	21	13	1	7	441	288	+153	27
5	Eastern Suburbs	21	10	2	9	316	393	-77	22
6	Wynnum-Manly	21	6	1	14	199	465	-266	13
7	Southern Suburbs	21	5	0	16	200	519	-319	10

== Finals ==
Home	Score	Away	Match Information
Home	Score	Away	Date and Time	Venue
Semifinals
Past Brothers	25-20	Fortitude Valley	21 August 1954	Brisbane Cricket Ground
Western Suburbs	32-17	Northern Suburbs	30 August 1954	Brisbane Exhibition Ground
Preliminary Final
Past Brothers	29-8	Northern Suburbs	4 September 1954	Brisbane Cricket Ground
Grand Final
Western Suburbs	35-18	Past Brothers	11 September 1954	Brisbane Cricket Ground

== Grand Final ==
Western Suburbs 35 (Tries: Meredith 2, Watson 2, McIntosh, Bishop, McCrohon. Goals: Watson 4, McCrohon 3)

Past Brothers 18 (Tries: Proberts, O'Malley, Craven, Otago. Goals: Dall 3)
