= 1957 Brisbane Rugby League season =

1957 Brisbane Rugby League
- Teams: 7
- Premiers: Fortitude Valley (9th title)
- Minor premiers: Past Brothers (3rd title)
- Wooden spoon: Wynnum-Manly (3rd spoon)

The 1957 Brisbane Rugby League season was the 49th season of the Brisbane Rugby League premiership. Seven teams from across Brisbane competed for the premiership, which culminated in Fortitude Valley defeating Past Brothers 18-17 in the grand final.

== Ladder ==
	Team	Pld	W	D	L	PF	PA	PD	Pts
1	Past Brothers	18	17	0	1	555	284	+271	34
2	Fortitude Valley	18	13	1	4	481	256	+225	27
3	Western Suburbs	18	9	0	9	463	440	+23	18
4	Northern Suburbs	18	8	1	9	466	371	+95	17
5	Eastern Suburbs	18	7	1	10	413	401	+12	15
6	Southern Suburbs	18	5	0	13	379	535	-156	10
7	Wynnum-Manly	18	2	1	15	306	536	-230	5

== Finals ==
Home	Score	Away	Match Information
Home	Score	Away	Date and Time	Venue	Referee	Crowd
Semifinals
Western Suburbs	12-8	Northern Suburbs	31 August 1957	Brisbane Cricket Ground	Nev Kelly	7,000
Past Brothers	20-12	Fortitude Valley	1 September 1957	Lang Park	Col Wright	20,000
Preliminary Final
Fortitude Valley	18-12	Western Suburbs	7 September 1957	Brisbane Cricket Ground	Jim Wallace	9,381
Grand Final
Fortitude Valley	18-17	Past Brothers	14 September 1957	Brisbane Cricket Ground	Nev Kelly	16,151
