= 1959 Brisbane Rugby League season =

The 1959 Brisbane Rugby League season was the 51st season of the Brisbane Rugby League premiership. Seven teams from across Brisbane competed for the premiership, which culminated in Northern Suburbs defeating Past Brothers 24-18 to claim their first premiership since 1950.

== Ladder ==
	Team	Pld	W	D	L	PF	PA	PD	Pts
1	Northern Suburbs	18	13	0	5	465	272	+193	26
2	Past Brothers	18	10	1	7	401	343	+58	21
3	Wynnum-Manly	18	10	0	8	320	307	+13	20
4	Fortitude Valley	18	10	0	8	383	415	-32	20
5	Eastern Suburbs	18	8	1	9	431	398	+33	17
6	Western Suburbs	18	6	0	12	327	397	-70	12
7	Southern Suburbs	18	5	0	13	317	514	-197	10

== Finals ==
Home	Score	Away	Match information
Home	Score	Away	Date and time	Venue	Referee	Crowd
Semifinals
Wynnum-Manly	15-11	Fortitude Valley	5 September 1959	Lang Park	Jim Wallace	10,516
Past Brothers	26-14	Northern Suburbs	6 September 1959	Lang Park	Col Wright	18,000
Preliminary Final
Northern Suburbs	12-3	Wynnum-Manly	12 September 1959	Lang Park	Nev Kelly	9,941
Grand Final
Northern Suburbs	24-18	Past Brothers	19 September 1959	Lang Park	Jim Wallace	18,921
