= 1933 Brisbane Rugby League season =

1933 Brisbane Rugby League
- Teams: 7
- Premiers: Fortitude Valley (3rd title)
- Minor premiers: Western Suburbs (3rd title)
- Wooden spoon: Southern Suburbs (2nd spoon)

The 1933 Brisbane Rugby League season was the 25th season of Brisbane's semi-professional rugby league football competition. Seven teams across Brisbane competed for the premiership, which culminated in Fortitude Valley defeating minor premiers Western Suburbs 9–3 in the final. As minor premiers, Wests were allowed a grand final challenge, which resulted in Fortitude Valley winning 18–5, and were thus, considered the premiers.

== Ladder ==
	Team	Pld	W	D	L	PF	PA	PD	Pts
1	Western Suburbs	12	9	0	3	221	146	+75	18
2	Fortitude Valley	12	8	0	4	231	131	+100	16
3	Past Brothers	12	7	1	4	221	122	+99	15
4	Eastern Suburbs	12	7	1	4	211	131	+80	15
5	Northern Suburbs	12	7	0	5	236	129	+107	14
6	University	12	3	0	9	132	381	-249	6
7	Southern Suburbs	12	0	0	12	119	336	-217	0

== Finals ==
Home	Score	Away	Match information
Home	Score	Away	Date and time	Venue
Semifinals
Western Suburbs	7-5	Eastern Suburbs	9 September 1933	Brisbane Cricket Ground
Fortitude Valley	8-7	Past Brothers	9 September 1933	Brisbane Cricket Ground
Final
Fortitude Valley	9-3	Western Suburbs	16 September 1933	Brisbane Cricket Ground
Grand Final Challenge
Fortitude Valley	18-5	Western Suburbs	23 September 1933	Davies Park
