= 1960 Brisbane Rugby League season =

The 1960 Brisbane Rugby League season was the 52nd season of the Brisbane Rugby League premiership. Eight teams from across Brisbane competed for the premiership, which culminated in Northern Suburbs defeating Fortitude Valley 18-5 to claim their second consecutive premiership.

== Ladder ==
| | Team | Pld | W | D | L | PF | PA | PD | Pts |
|---|---|---|---|---|---|---|---|---|---|
| 1 | Fortitude Valley | 21 | 15 | 0 | 6 | 411 | 291 | +120 | 30 |
| 2 | Northern Suburbs | 20 | 14 | 1 | 5 | 376 | 254 | +122 | 29 |
| 3 | Eastern Suburbs | 21 | 14 | 1 | 6 | 425 | 343 | +82 | 29 |
| 4 | Western Suburbs | 21 | 13 | 0 | 8 | 371 | 293 | +78 | 26 |
| 5 | Past Brothers | 21 | 11 | 0 | 10 | 356 | 303 | +53 | 22 |
| 6 | Redcliffe | 21 | 7 | 0 | 14 | 318 | 415 | -97 | 14 |
| 7 | Wynnum-Manly | 21 | 4 | 0 | 17 | 288 | 487 | -199 | 8 |
| 8 | Southern Suburbs | 21 | 3 | 2 | 16 | 273 | 432 | -159 | 8 |

== Finals ==
| Home | Score | Away | Match Information |
| Home | Score | Away | Date and Time | Venue | Referee | Crowd |
|---|---|---|---|---|---|---|
| Semifinals |
| Western Suburbs | 10-8 | Eastern Suburbs | 30 August 1960 | Lang Park | Henry Albert |
| Northern Suburbs | 20-0 | Fortitude Valley | 31 August 1960 | Lang Park | Don Lancashire |
| Preliminary Final |
| Fortitude Valley | 22-2 | Western Suburbs | 6 September 1960 | Lang Park | Don Lancashire | 20,000 |
| Grand Final |
| Northern Suburbs | 18-5 | Fortitude Valley | 13 September 1960 | Lang Park | Don Lancashire | 34,752 |
