= 1963 Brisbane Rugby League season =

The 1963 Brisbane Rugby League season was the 55th season of the Brisbane Rugby League premiership. Eight teams from across Brisbane competed for the premiership, which culminated in Northern Suburbs defeating Southern Suburbs 18-8 to claim their fifth consecutive premiership.

== Ladder ==
	Team	Pld	W	D	L	PF	PA	PD	Pts
1	Northern Suburbs	21	16	1	4	518	244	+274	33
2	Southern Suburbs	21	13	1	7	356	247	+109	27
3	Redcliffe	21	12	1	8	255	267	-12	25
4	Western Suburbs	21	12	0	9	345	318	+27	24
5	Wynnum-Manly	21	11	1	9	324	265	+59	23
6	Fortitude Valley	21	10	2	9	318	275	+43	22
7	Eastern Suburbs	21	3	2	16	230	479	-249	8
8	Past Brothers	21	3	0	18	196	442	-246	6

== Finals ==
Home	Score	Away	Match Information
Home	Score	Away	Date and Time	Venue	Referee	Crowd
Semi-finals
Redcliffe	10-5	Western Suburbs	7 September 1963	Lang Park	Don Lancashire
Southern Suburbs	23-3	Northern Suburbs	8 September 1963	Lang Park	Henry Albert
Preliminary Final
Northern Suburbs	22-13	Redcliffe	14 September 1963	Lang Park	Don Lancashire
Grand Final
Northern Suburbs	18-8	Southern Suburbs	21 September 1963	Lang Park	Don Lancashire	18,000
