= 1964 Brisbane Rugby League season =

The 1964 Brisbane Rugby League season was the 56th season of the Brisbane Rugby League premiership. Eight teams from across Brisbane competed for the premiership, which culminated in Northern Suburbs defeating Past Brothers 13–4 to claim their sixth consecutive premiership - the most consecutive first grade premierships won by any BRL club.

== Ladder ==
	Team	Pld	W	D	L	PF	PA	PD	Pts
1	Fortitude Valley	21	16	0	5	375	275	+100	32
2	Past Brothers	21	15	1	5	432	304	+128	31
3	Northern Suburbs	21	13	0	8	402	287	+115	26
4	Redcliffe	21	11	2	8	358	290	+68	24
5	Western Suburbs	21	11	0	10	341	346	-5	22
6	Southern Suburbs	21	7	0	14	338	423	-85	14
7	Eastern Suburbs	21	5	0	16	227	441	-214	10
8	Wynnum-Manly	21	4	1	16	276	383	-107	9

== Finals ==
Home	Score	Away	Match Information
Home	Score	Away	Date and Time	Venue	Referee	Crowd
Semi-finals
Northern Suburbs	17-12	Redcliffe	29 August 1964	Lang Park	Don Lancashire
Past Brothers	19-5	Fortitude Valley	30 August 1964	Lang Park	Henry Albert
Preliminary Final
Northern Suburbs	9-7	Fortitude Valley	5 September 1964	Lang Park	Don Lancashire	13,000
Grand Final
Northern Suburbs	13-4	Past Brothers	11 September 1964	Lang Park	Don Lancashire	21,000
