= 1966 Brisbane Rugby League season =

The 1966 Brisbane Rugby League season was the 58th season of the Brisbane Rugby League premiership. Eight teams from across Brisbane competed for the premiership, which culminated in minor premiers Northern Suburbs defeating Past Brothers 9-6 in the grand final, winning their seventh premiership in eight years.

== Ladder ==
	Team	Pld	W	D	L	PF	PA	PD	Pts
1	Northern Suburbs	21	15	1	5	408	214	+194	31
2	Past Brothers	21	14	1	6	379	303	+76	29
3	Fortitude Valley	21	12	2	7	298	227	+71	26
4	Redcliffe	21	11	1	9	331	261	+70	23
5	Southern Suburbs	21	10	0	11	331	325	+6	20
6	Eastern Suburbs	21	10	0	11	348	245	+103	20
7	Western Suburbs	21	7	1	13	232	325	-93	15
8	Wynnum-Manly	21	2	0	19	185	612	-427	4

== Finals ==
Home	Score	Away	Match Information
Home	Score	Away	Date and Time	Venue	Referee	Crowd
Semi-finals
Northern Suburbs	14-10	Past Brothers	27 August 1966	Lang Park	Don Lancashire	12,000
Fortitude Valley	18-13	Redcliffe	28 August 1966	Lang Park	Henry Albert
Preliminary Final
Past Brothers	7-6	Fortitude Valley	3 September 1966	Lang Park	Ron Harbottle	10,893
Grand Final
Northern Suburbs	9-6	Past Brothers	10 September 1966	Lang Park	Henry Albert	21,499

== Grand Final ==
Northern Suburbs 9 (Tries: Cattanach, Goals: Lobegeiger 2, Field goals: Brown)

Past Brothers 6 (Goals: Cavanagh 2, Dowling)
