= 1973 Brisbane Rugby League season =

Rugby football season

1973 Brisbane Rugby League
- Teams: 8
- Premiers: Fortitude Valley
- Minor premiers: Fortitude Valley

The 1973 Brisbane Rugby League season was the 65th season of the Brisbane Rugby League premiership. Eight teams from across Brisbane competed for the premiership, which culminated in Fortitude Valley defeating Redcliffe 15–7 in the grand final.

== Season summary ==
Teams played each other three times, with 21 rounds of competition played. It resulted in a top four of Fortitude Valley, Eastern Suburbs, Northern Suburbs and Redcliffe.

=== Ladder ===
	Team	Pld	W	D	L	PF	PA	PD	Pts
1	Fortitude Valley	21	15	1	5	393	267	+126	31
2	Eastern Suburbs	21	12	2	7	399	320	+79	26
3	Northern Suburbs	21	12	1	8	399	289	+110	25
4	Redcliffe	21	12	0	9	368	255	+113	24
5	Past Brothers	21	10	1	10	383	354	+29	21
6	Western Suburbs	21	8	1	12	354	359	-5	17
7	Southern Suburbs	21	8	1	12	309	401	-92	17
8	Wynnum-Manly	21	3	1	17	247	607	-360	7

== Finals ==
Home	Score	Away	Match Information
Home	Score	Away	Date and Time	Venue	Referee
Semi-finals
Redcliffe	25-9	Northern Suburbs	26 August 1973	Lang Park	Bernie Pramberg
Fortitude Valley	35-7	Eastern Suburbs	2 September 1973	Lang Park	Henry Albert
Preliminary Final
Redcliffe	33-8	Eastern Suburbs	9 September 1973	Lang Park	Bernie Pramberg
Grand Final
Fortitude Valley	15-7	Redcliffe	16 September 1973	Lang Park	Bernie Pramberg
