= 1934 Brisbane Rugby League season =

1934 Brisbane Rugby League
- Teams: 7
- Premiers: Northern Suburbs (2nd title)
- Minor premiers: Western Suburbs (4th title)
- Wooden spoon: Southern Suburbs (3rd spoon)

The 1934 Brisbane Rugby League season was the 26th season of Brisbane's semi-professional rugby league football competition. Six teams competed for the premiership, which culminated in Northern Suburbs defeating minor premiers Western Suburbs 7–4 in the final.

== Ladder ==
	Team	Pld	W	D	L	PF	PA	PD	Pts
1	Western Suburbs	11	9	0	2	196	92	+104	18
2	Northern Suburbs	11	8	1	3	198	111	+87	17
3	Fortitude Valley	11	6	0	5	129	121	+8	12
4	Past Brothers	11	5	1	6	167	97	+70	11
5	Eastern Suburbs	11	5	0	6	164	113	+51	10
6	Southern Suburbs	11	0	0	11	95	246	-151	0

== Finals ==
Home	Score	Away	Match Information
Home	Score	Away	Date and Time	Venue
Semifinals
Past Brothers	11–6	Fortitude Valley	27 August 1934	Brisbane Cricket Ground
Northern Suburbs	12–8	Western Suburbs	1 September 1934	Brisbane Cricket Ground
Preliminary Final
Western Suburbs	19–12	Past Brothers	15 September 1934	Brisbane Cricket Ground
Grand Final
Northern Suburbs	7–4	Western Suburbs	22 September 1934	Davies Park
