= 1958 Brisbane Rugby League season =

The 1958 Brisbane Rugby League season was the 50th season of the Brisbane Rugby League premiership. Seven teams from across Brisbane competed for the premiership, which culminated in Past Brothers defeating Fortitude Valley 22–7 in the grand final.

== Ladder ==
	Team	Pld	W	D	L	PF	PA	PD	Pts
1	Western Suburbs	18	14	0	4	434	336	+98	28
2	Fortitude Valley	18	11	1	6	336	318	+18	22
3	Past Brothers	18	10	1	7	517	328	+189	21
4	Wynnum-Manly	18	8	1	9	369	397	-28	17
5	Northern Suburbs	18	8	1	9	379	458	-79	17
6	Eastern Suburbs	18	5	0	13	307	400	-93	10
7	Southern Suburbs	18	5	0	13	278	412	-134	10

== Finals ==
Home	Score	Away	Match Information
Home	Score	Away	Date and Time	Venue	Referee	Crowd
Semifinals
Past Brothers	33-20	Wynnum-Manly	6 September 1958	Lang Park	Jim Wallace	10,330
Fortitude Valley	25-16	Western Suburbs	7 September 1958	Lang Park	Col Wright
Preliminary Final
Past Brothers	37-5	Western Suburbs	13 September 1958	Lang Park	Nev Kelly	14,781
Grand Final
Past Brothers	22-7	Fortitude Valley	20 September 1958	Lang Park	Jim Wallace	20,000
