= 1965 Brisbane Rugby League season =

The 1965 Brisbane Rugby League season was the 57th season of the Brisbane Rugby League premiership. Eight teams from across Brisbane competed for the premiership, which culminated in Redcliffe defeating Fortitude Valley 15–2 to claim their first premiership in club history.

== Ladder ==
	Team	Pld	W	D	L	PF	PA	PD	Pts
1	Fortitude Valley	21	15	0	6	321	223	+98	30
2	Redcliffe	21	14	1	6	354	259	+95	29
3	Northern Suburbs	21	14	0	7	374	211	+163	28
4	Past Brothers	21	13	0	8	316	227	+89	26
5	Wynnum-Manly	21	8	0	13	300	358	-58	16
6	Western Suburbs	21	8	0	13	263	400	-137	16
7	Eastern Suburbs	21	6	1	14	212	333	-121	13
8	Southern Suburbs	21	5	0	16	266	360	-94	10

== Finals ==
Home	Score	Away	Match Information
Home	Score	Away	Date and Time	Venue	Referee	Crowd
Semi-finals
Past Brothers	22-8	Northern Suburbs	28 August 1965	Lang Park	Don Lancashire	11,500
Fortitude Valley	15-11	Redcliffe	29 August 1965	Lang Park	Henry Albert	10,000
Preliminary Final
Redcliffe	12-5	Past Brothers	4 September 1965	Lang Park	Henry Albert	16,000
Grand Final
Redcliffe	15-2	Fortitude Valley	11 September 1965	Lang Park	Henry Albert	25,309
