= 1974 Brisbane Rugby League season =

1974 Brisbane Rugby League
- Teams: 8
- Premiers: Fortitude Valley
- Minor premiers: Northern Suburbs

The 1974 Brisbane Rugby League season was the 66th season of the Brisbane Rugby League premiership. Eight teams from across Brisbane competed for the premiership, which culminated in Fortitude Valley defeating Past Brothers 9–2 in the grand final.

== Ladder ==
	Team	Pld	W	D	L	PF	PA	PD	Pts
1	Northern Suburbs	21	16	0	5	423	296	+127	32
2	Fortitude Valley	21	14	0	7	356	346	+10	27
3	Southern Suburbs	21	11	1	9	319	337	+18	26
4	Past Brothers	21	10	1	10	330	338	-8	24
5	Redcliffe	21	10	0	11	314	342	-28	21
6	Wynnum-Manly	21	9	0	12	264	385	-121	17
7	Eastern Suburbs	21	7	1	13	283	490	-207	12
8	Western Suburbs	21	5	1	15	301	495	-194	9

== Finals ==
Home	Score	Away	Match Information
Home	Score	Away	Date and Time	Venue	Referee
Semi-finals
Past Brothers	27-12	Southern Suburbs	1 September 1974	Lang Park	Bernie Pramberg
Fortitude Valley	16-15	Northern Suburbs	8 September 1974	Lang Park	Bernie Pramberg
Preliminary Final
Past Brothers	12-9	Northern Suburbs	15 September 1974	Lang Park	Bernie Pramberg
Grand Final
Fortitude Valley	9-2	Past Brothers	22 September 1974	Lang Park	Bernie Pramberg
