= 1930 Brisbane Rugby League season =

1930 Brisbane Rugby League
- Teams: 6
- Premiers: Carlton (2nd title)
- Minor premiers: Carlton (2nd title)
- Wooden spoon: University (4th spoon)

The 1930 Brisbane Rugby League premiership was the 22nd season of Brisbane's semi-professional rugby league football competition. Six teams from across Brisbane competed for the premiership. The season culminated in Fortitude Valley defeating Carlton 10-0 in the grand final. As minor premiers, Carlton were allowed to challenge. The Grand final challenge was played a month later with Carlton winning 19-8 against Valleys and were thus determined as the premiers.

== Ladder ==
	Team	Pld	W	D	L	PF	PA	PD	Pts
1	Carlton	10	9	1	0	218	62	+156	19
2	Coorparoo	10	5	1	4	78	101	-23	11
3	Fortitude Valley	10	5	1	4	162	102	+60	11
4	Past Grammars	10	4	1	5	103	107	-4	9
5	Western Suburbs	10	3	0	7	95	151	-56	6
6	University	10	2	0	8	100	215	-114	4

== Finals ==
Home	Score	Away	Match Information
Home	Score	Away	Date and Time	Venue
Semifinals
Carlton	8-6	Coorparoo	5 July 1930	Brisbane Exhibition Grounds
Fortitude Valley	18-11	Past Grammars	5 July 1930	Brisbane Exhibition Grounds
Grand Final
Fortitude Valley	10-0	Carlton	12 July 1930	Brisbane Exhibition Grounds
Grand Final Challenge
Carlton	19-8	Fortitude Valley	16 August 1930	Davies Park
