= 1968 Brisbane Rugby League season =

The 1968 Brisbane Rugby League season was the 60th season of the Brisbane Rugby League premiership. Eight teams from across Brisbane competed for the premiership, which culminated in Past Brothers defeating Eastern Suburbs 21–4 in the grand final, winning their second consecutive premiership.

== Ladder ==
	Team	Pld	W	D	L	PF	PA	PD	Pts
1	Past Brothers	21	16	0	5	381	233	+148	32
2	Eastern Suburbs	21	15	0	6	363	244	+119	30
3	Fortitude Valley	21	14	1	6	355	263	+92	29
4	Northern Suburbs	21	11	1	9	365	295	+70	23
5	Redcliffe	21	11	0	10	357	312	+45	22
6	Wynnum-Manly	21	8	1	12	310	346	-36	17
7	Western Suburbs	21	5	0	16	265	390	-125	10
8	Southern Suburbs	21	2	1	18	178	491	-313	5

== Finals ==
Home	Score	Away	Match Information
Home	Score	Away	Date and Time	Venue	Referee	Crowd
Semi-finals
Past Brothers	19-13	Eastern Suburbs	31 August 1968	Lang Park	Pat McGrory
Fortitude Valley	18-15	Northern Suburbs	1 September 1968	Lang Park	Bob Ward	18,000
Preliminary Final
Eastern Suburbs	12-9	Fortitude Valley	7 September 1968	Lang Park	Pat McGrory
Grand Final
Past Brothers	21-4	Eastern Suburbs	13 September 1968	Lang Park	Pat McGrory	36,188

== Grand Final ==
Past Brothers 21 (Tries: Wayne Abdy 2, John Smith, Eric Gelling, Pat Maguire Goals: Nev Harman 3)

Eastern Suburbs 4 (Goals: Peter Lobegeiger 2)
