= 1961 Brisbane Rugby League season =

The 1961 Brisbane Rugby League season was the 53rd season of the Brisbane Rugby League premiership. Eight teams from across Brisbane competed for the premiership, which culminated in a third straight grand final matchup between Northern Suburbs and Fortitude Valley. Norths won 29-5 to claim their third consecutive premiership.

== Ladder ==
	Team	Pld	W	D	L	PF	PA	PD	Pts
1	Northern Suburbs	21	16	0	5	443	248	+195	32
2	Redcliffe	21	13	0	8	430	302	+128	26
3	Fortitude Valley	21	12	1	8	407	328	+79	25
4	Western Suburbs	21	10	2	9	359	355	+4	22
5	Past Brothers	21	10	1	10	370	328	+42	21
6	Southern Suburbs	21	7	1	13	281	387	-106	15
7	Wynnum-Manly	21	7	0	14	282	529	-247	14
8	Eastern Suburbs	21	6	1	14	292	396	-104	13

== Finals ==
Home	Score	Away	Match Information
Home	Score	Away	Date and Time	Venue	Referee	Crowd
Semifinals
Fortitude Valley	30-7	Western Suburbs	9 September 1961	Lang Park	Don Lancashire	8,472
Northern Suburbs	29-5	Redcliffe	10 September 1961	Lang Park	Henry Albert	16,000
Preliminary Final
Fortitude Valley	20-14	Redcliffe	16 September 1961	Lang Park	Henry Albert	10,921
Grand Final
Northern Suburbs	29-5	Fortitude Valley	23 September 1961	Lang Park	Henry Albert	19,824
