= 1962 Brisbane Rugby League season =

The 1962 Brisbane Rugby League season was the 54th season of the Brisbane Rugby League premiership. Eight teams from across Brisbane competed for the premiership, which culminated in Northern Suburbs defeating Fortitude Valley 22-0 to claim their fourth consecutive premiership.

== Ladder ==
	Team	Pld	W	D	L	PF	PA	PD	Pts
1	Northern Suburbs	21	15	1	5	404	276	+128	31
2	Southern Suburbs	21	13	1	7	336	273	+63	27
3	Eastern Suburbs	21	11	0	10	325	352	-27	22
4	Fortitude Valley	21	11	0	10	295	279	+16	22
5	Redcliffe	21	10	0	11	333	318	+15	20
6	Western Suburbs	21	8	0	13	337	395	-58	16
7	Past Brothers	21	8	0	13	319	374	-55	16
8	Wynnum-Manly	21	7	0	14	250	325	-75	14

== Finals ==
Home	Score	Away	Match Information
Home	Score	Away	Date and Time	Venue	Referee	Crowd
Semi-finals
Fortitude Valley	13-9	Eastern Suburbs	1 September 1962	Lang Park	Don Lancashire	8,000
Northern Suburbs	21-6	Southern Suburbs	2 September 1962	Lang Park	Henry Albert	11,500
Preliminary Final
Fortitude Valley	15-9	Southern Suburbs	8 September 1962	Lang Park	Henry Albert	10,000
Grand Final
Northern Suburbs	22-0	Fortitude Valley	15 September 1962	Lang Park	Henry Albert	17,000
