= 1929 Brisbane Rugby League season =

1929 Brisbane Rugby League
- Teams: 7
- Premiers: University (2nd title)
- Minor premiers: University (1st title)
- Wooden spoon: Western Suburbs (2nd spoon)

The 1929 Brisbane Rugby League premiership was the 21st season of Brisbane's semi-professional rugby league football competition. Seven teams from across Brisbane competed for the premiership. The season culminated in University defeating Coorparoo 12-11 in the grand final.

== Ladder ==
	Team	Pld	W	D	L	PF	PA	PD	Pts
1	University	12	9	0	3	200	125	+75	18
2	Fortitude Valley	12	8	0	4	151	109	+42	16
3	Coorparoo	12	7	1	4	108	165	-57	15
4	Carlton	12	7	0	5	134	122	+12	14
5	Past Grammars	12	4	0	8	120	158	-38	8
6	Past Brothers	11	3	1	7	119	162	-43	7
7	Western Suburbs	11	3	0	8	134	148	-14	6

== Finals ==
Home	Score	Away	Match Information
Home	Score	Away	Date and Time	Venue	Reference
Semifinals
University	19-10	Fortitude Valley	14 September 1929	Brisbane Exhibition Grounds
Coorparoo	13-5	Carlton	14 September 1929	Brisbane Exhibition Grounds
Grand Final
University	12-11	Coorparoo	21 September 1929	Brisbane Exhibition Grounds
