= 1956 Brisbane Rugby League season =

1956 Brisbane Rugby League
- Teams: 7
- Premiers: Past Brothers (6th title)
- Minor premiers: Past Brothers (2nd title)
- Wooden spoon: Coorparoo (8th spoon)

The 1956 Brisbane Rugby League season was the 48th season of the Brisbane Rugby League premiership. Seven teams from across Brisbane competed for the premiership, which culminated in Past Brothers defeating Western Suburbs 17-10 in the grand final.

== Ladder ==
	Team	Pld	W	D	L	PF	PA	PD	Pts
1	Past Brothers	18	15	0	3	616	313	+303	30
2	Western Suburbs	18	14	0	4	515	337	+178	28
3	Fortitude Valley	18	11	0	7	458	290	+168	22
4	Wynnum-Manly	18	7	0	11	340	543	-203	14
5	Southern Suburbs	18	6	0	12	275	466	-191	12
6	Northern Suburbs	18	4	2	12	293	471	-178	10
7	Eastern Suburbs	18	4	2	12	321	406	-85	10

== Finals ==
Home	Score	Away	Match Information
Home	Score	Away	Date and Time	Venue	Referee	Crowd	Ref
Semifinals
Past Brothers	16-8	Western Suburbs	25 August 1956	Brisbane Cricket Ground	Col Wright	5,000
Fortitude Valley	40-13	Wynnum-Manly	26 August 1956	Lang Park	Jim Wallace
Preliminary Final
Western Suburbs	23-9	Fortitude Valley	5 September 1956	Brisbane Exhibition Grounds	Nev Kelly	9,588
Grand Final
Past Brothers	18-17	Western Suburbs	8 September 1956	Brisbane Cricket Ground	Col Wright	14,000
