= 1932 Brisbane Rugby League season =

Rugby League season

1932 Brisbane Rugby League
- Teams: 8
- Premiers: Western Suburbs (2nd title)
- Minor premiers: Western Suburbs (2nd title)
- Wooden spoon: Wynnum-Manly (1st spoon)

The 1932 Brisbane Rugby League premiership was the 24th season of Brisbane's semi-professional rugby league football competition. Eight teams from across Brisbane competed for the premiership, which culminated in the minor premiers Western Suburbs defeating Past Grammars (now Norths Devils) 8-7 in the grand final.

== Ladder ==
	Team	Pld	W	D	L	PF	PA	PD	Pts
1	Western Suburbs	13	11	0	2	231	128	+103	22
2	Past Grammars	13	8	1	4	166	184	-18	17
3	Coorparoo	13	7	1	5	165	141	+24	15
4	Carlton	13	7	1	5	144	125	+19	15
5	Fortitude Valley	13	6	0	7	197	125	+72	12
6	University Students	13	4	2	7	172	228	-56	10
7	Past Brothers	13	4	1	7	147	183	-36	9
8	Wynnum	13	2	0	11	96	290	-194	4

== Finals ==
Home	Score	Away	Match Information
Home	Score	Away	Date and Time	Venue
Semifinals
Past Grammars	13-2	Carlton	30 July 1932	Brisbane Cricket Ground
Western Suburbs	13-7	Coorparoo	13 August 1932	Brisbane Cricket Ground
Preliminary Final
Past Grammars	24-10	Western Suburbs	20 August 1932	Brisbane Cricket Ground
Grand Final
Western Suburbs	8-7	Past Grammars	3 September 1932	Brisbane Cricket Ground
