= Rod Morris =

Australia international rugby league player

Personal information
- Born: 12 June 1950 (age 76) Ipswich, Queensland, Australia

Playing information
- Position: Prop
Club
Years	Team	Pld	T	G	FG	P
	Easts (Brisbane)
1979–81	Balmain Tigers	56	4	0	0	12
1982–??	Wynnum-Manly	?				?
	Total		4	0	0
Representative
Years	Team	Pld	T	G	FG	P
1976–79	Queensland	6	0	0	0	0
1979–81	New South Wales	6	0	0	0	0
1980–82	Queensland (Origin)	4	0	0	0	0
1977–82	Australia	17	1	0	0	3
- Relatives: Des Morris (brother)

Rod Morris is an Australian former professional rugby league footballer who played in the 1970s and 1980s. An Australian international and Queensland State of Origin representative front row forward, he played club football in the New South Wales Rugby Football League for Balmain, and in the Brisbane Rugby League for Eastern Suburbs (with whom he won the 1977 and 1978 Grand Finals) and Wynnum-Manly (with whom he won the 1982 Grand Final).

== Playing career ==
Morris was a Brisbane Easts player who first represented for Queensland in 1976 and then Australia in 1977. He signed with the Balmain Tigers in 1979 and was brought to Sydney, thus becoming eligible to play for New South Wales under the selection criterion of the time. In the 1979 interstate series he played against his Queensland resident brother Des Morris. He then played for Queensland in 1980 in the first ever Rugby League State of Origin under the new origin selection criterion.

Morris was a 1978 Kangaroo tourist playing in two Tests and ten minor tour matches. He played in all three Tests of the 1979 domestic Ashes series which Australia won 3–0.

Morris made a return to Brisbane club football in 1982 and captained Wynnum-Manly at the age of 32 to a Brisbane Rugby League premiership title which was Wynnum-Manly's first ever. He put in a man-of-the-match performance in the 2nd game of the 1982 State of Origin series before making his last representative appearances in that year's Kangaroo Tour, playing in four tour matches and contributing to the Invincibles' unbeaten tour record, being the only player in the team, however, to not score a try on the tour.

Morris is also remembered for his short-lived "Deer in the headlights" style when making his Channel Nine debut as a commentator for the 1989 State of Origin series.

He is one of a number of players to have represented both Queensland and New South Wales and one of the foundation Origin representatives whose NSW appearances were bookended by selections for Queensland.

== Business career ==
Rod Morris is a retired McDonald's franchisee owner who previously owned six McDonald's Franchise's situated in Capalaba, Cleveland, Cannon Hill, Victoria Point, Wynnum West and Morningside, Queensland, Australia.

In March 2021, he expanded his business ventures by acquiring and constructing an additional location in Morningside, known as McDonald's Colmslie Business Park.

According to Mr. Morris, 'This location will generate more than 100 new jobs and will employ 120 locals from the area including a mix of, full-time, part-time, and casual roles including crew, management, baristas and maintenance.' Mr Morris, has also been able to provide eight employees from his Cannon Hill store with an opportunity to step into managerial roles.

Rod Morris begun his franchising journey back in 1985 with the establishment of McDonald's Capalaba stores. Eventually, he made the decision to pass some of his restaurants to his son, Steven Morris, by selling the Capalaba and Cleveland franchise to him.

In late January 2025, Rod Morris retired from Franchisee duties after 40 years, selling the stores he owned at the time, McDonalds Cannon Hill and McDonalds Colmslie Business Park) to his son, Steven Morris.

== Sources ==
- Andrews, Malcolm (2006) The ABC of Rugby League Austn Broadcasting Corpn, Sydney
