= Brisbane Rugby League premiership =

Rugby league football competition

Brisbane Rugby League
- Sport: Rugby league
- Inaugural season: 1922 (1909 as QRL)
- Ceased: 1997
- Replaced by: Australian Rugby League; Queensland Cup
- Country: Australia
- Last premiers: Redcliffe Dolphins (1997)
- Most titles: Fortitude Valley Diehards (16 titles)
- Related competition: Brisbane Rugby League (2001)

The Brisbane Rugby League premiership was a rugby league football competition in Brisbane, Queensland, Australia. It was first held in 1922 and for every year until 1997. The competition was reinstated in 2001, known as the FOGS premiership under the Queensland Cup. The competition consists of Brisbane's top six rugby league clubs.
Each participating team is a feeder club for the Queensland Cup.

Prior to 1922, the competition was conducted under the auspices of the Queensland Rugby League. Until the 1980s it was the premier sporting competition in Brisbane, attracting large crowds and broad media coverage. The Brisbane Rugby League however, had been in slow decline for some 15 years as large numbers of its players left to compete in the more lucrative Sydney Rugby League, and began to lose popular interest with the creation of the Brisbane Broncos in 1988. Also in 1988, the Sydney Rugby League de facto superseded the Brisbane Rugby League by going national and including the Brisbane and Gold Coast clubs. However, the BRL maintained legal top-flight status until the advent of the national Australian Rugby League premiership in 1995, which superseded both Brisbane Rugby League premiership and the Sydney Rugby League premiership. The Brisbane Rugby League premiership then became a second-tier competition until it ceased and was fully replaced at this level by the Queensland Cup before the 1998 season. The FOGS Cup, a third-tier competition under the NRL and Queensland Cup, changed its name to the Brisbane Rugby League in 2016.

== History ==
=== Predecessor: QRFL ===
The Queensland Rugby Football League (QRFL) was formed in 1908 by seven former rugby union players who were dissatisfied with the administration of the Queensland Rugby Union (QRU). The new organisation was attacked by both the local press and the QRU for introducing professionalism, which they claimed would destroy the sport. The "founding fathers" of the QRFL included John Fihelly, an Australian Labor Party Member of Parliament who became Minister for Railways and Deputy Premier.

The first official club competition kicked off in Brisbane on 8 May 1909. Norths played against Souths before a handful of spectators at Brisbane Cricket Ground. Matches were played under the auspices of the Queensland Amateur Rugby Football League (later renamed Queensland Rugby League). The foundation clubs were:

- North Brisbane
- Fortitude Valley
- South Brisbane
- Toombul

Queensland Rugby Football League Grand Finals
Season	Grand Final Information
Season	Premiers	Score	Runners-Up
1909	Fortitude Valley	22–4	South Brisbane
1910	Ipswich	17–2	Toombul
1911	Fortitude Valley-Toombul	13–2	Ipswich B
1912	Brisbane Natives	10–0	South Brisbane
1913	West End	5–3	Brisbane Natives
1914	Fortitude Valley	18–8	West End
1915	Fortitude Valley	10–9	West Brisbane
1916	West Brisbane	4–2	Fortitude Valley
1917	Fortitude Valley	13–5	Brothers Old Boys/Merthyrs
1918	Fortitude Valley	16–12	Brothers Old Boys/Merthyrs
1919	Fortitude Valley	28–2	Coorparoo
1920	West Brisbane	16–8	Brothers Old Boys
1921	Carltons	12–10	Coorparoo

Note: Queensland Rugby League era statistics are not counted as Brisbane Rugby League statistics.

=== Schism: establishment of the Brisbane Rugby League ===
In 1922 the Brisbane Rugby Football League (Brisbane Rugby Football League, later Brisbane Rugby League) was formed out of dissatisfaction with the way the Queensland Rugby League ran the game. Those involved took particular exception to the salary being earned by Harry Sunderland as secretary of the Queensland Rugby League. The Brisbane Rugby League took control of the local competition. Competing in the Brisbane Rugby League competition that year were Brothers, Carltons, Coorparoo, University, Valley and Wests, with Past Grammars rejoining in 1924. Although the Queensland Rugby League attempted to regain control of the Brisbane Rugby League competition in 1923 and 1924, the Brisbane Rugby League remained steadfast and the dispute simmered into the next decade. so dire did the situation become, that by the late 1920s, the Queensland Rugby League commenced its own competition involving Ipswich clubs and two supporting Brisbane clubs.

Until 1932 Brisbane Exhibition Ground was the home of rugby league in the city. The complicated arrangement between the Brisbane Rugby League, Queensland Rugby League and Royal National Association (who administered the Exhibition Ground) led to Brisbane Cricket Ground being used for rugby league matches.

In 1933 district football was introduced to provide community support and player equalisation. This meant that players had to live within a certain distance of their club. Accordingly, Brisbane was divided into Eastern Suburbs (incorporating Coorparoo and Wynnum), Southern Suburbs (incorporating Carltons), Western Suburbs, Northern Suburbs (incorporating Past Grammars), Fortitude Valley and Past Brothers (whose players had to prove that they had attended a Christian Brothers school). In 1934, the University Amateur Rugby League Club folded and disappeared from the competition.

In 1953 the friction between the Queensland Rugby League and Brisbane Rugby League ended, with the Brisbane Rugby League being replaced by the Brisbane division of the Queensland Rugby League. Former Brisbane Rugby League chairman and Queensland Rugby League secretary Ron McAullife eventually secured the use of Brisbane Football Stadium as a permanent home for rugby league in Queensland. Teams that joined the Brisbane Rugby League competition around this time were South Coast (1952–1953), Wynnum-Manly (1951) and Redcliffe (1960).

A then-record crowd at Brisbane Football Stadium of 19,824 saw Northern Suburbs defeat Fortitude Valley in the Brisbane Rugby League grand final in September 1961.

=== Golden Years ===
In 1967 the Queensland Rugby League removed the residential qualifications for players in Brisbane Rugby League clubs, meaning that players did not have to reside in their certain suburbs to play for their teams. This reduced community support for teams, and club decisions began to be made on a more commercial basis.

This coincided with the commencement of television broadcasts of Brisbane Rugby League games in the same year. The money made from jersey sponsorships and advertising hoardings at grounds was not able to compete with poker machine money available to Sydney Rugby League clubs in the Sydney Rugby League, and an increasing number of players left the Brisbane Rugby League. This also affected the popularity of the Bulimba Cup which had been held between the cities of Brisbane, Ipswich and Toowoomba since the 1930s.

In 1978 the premiership trophy, the Kirks Cup was replaced by the Winfield Cup.

The Queensland Rugby League commissioned Eric White Associates to investigate the administrative structure of the game in Queensland in 1977. One of the recommendations was the creation of a statewide competition. The Winfield State League was created in 1982. The State League competition ran in parallel to the Brisbane Rugby League competition from 1982 to 1995. Also, like with Sydney's competition, Brisbane's competition was also called the Winfield Cup during the 1980s, due to sponsorship from Winfield cigarettes. The Queensland Cup would eventually replace both the State league and the Brisbane Rugby League premiership in 1996 and 1998.

In the 1980s, two further teams were added to the Brisbane Rugby League competition: Ipswich (1986) and Logan (1987).

Despite some New South Wales Rugby League (Sydney Rugby League) premiership games being re-broadcast during late night timeslots from the late 1970s, the Brisbane Rugby League remained the more popular competition in Queensland until 1988 with the weekly live broadcast of the Match of the Round being played at Lang Park.

=== Decline ===
In 1986 the New South Wales Rugby League decided to allow a team from Brisbane to enter the Sydney Rugby League premiership. While the New South Wales Rugby League was originally negotiating a Brisbane team sponsored by the Queensland Rugby League, a private bid in the form of the Brisbane Broncos was instead accepted by the New South Wales Rugby League. The Brisbane Broncos debuted in the Sydney Rugby League premiership in 1988.

As the Broncos began to represent Brisbane at rugby league in the public eye the Brisbane Rugby League competition entered the terminal phase of its decline. The dominance of the Brisbane Broncos in the media resulted in the Brisbane Rugby League losing live coverage of games and receiving only minor interest from the sports media. The drop in interest saw the Brisbane Rugby League, its clubs and its junior development base incurring significant and crippling financial losses. Several longstanding clubs were not able to survive the impact over the coming years.

From 1988, Brisbane Rugby League players weren't chosen to represent Queensland again. The Brisbane Rugby League premiership was fully superseded by the Australian Rugby League Premiership which took nationwide first-class status in 1995. The Brisbane Rugby League became a state competition from 1995-97 until the Queensland Cup, which became a league-style competition in 1998, superseded the Brisbane Rugby League as the top state league. Redcliffe won the last Brisbane Rugby League Grand Final in 1997 defeating Eastern Suburbs 35–6, and the league was then declared defunct.

=== Return of the Brisbane Rugby League Premiership ===
On 26 September 2014, the South East Queensland Division announced that they will be scrapping the existing FOGS Cup structure and reforming the Brisbane Rugby League as the state's secondary competition. Legally, although they share the same name, this competition is completely separate from the original BRL.

== Teams ==
Colours	Club Name	Club Nickname	First Season(s)	Last Season(s)	BRL Grand Finals
Colours	Club Name	Club Nickname	First Season(s)	Last Season(s)	Played	Won	Lost
	Brisbane (BRL)	Broncos	1994	1995	0	0	0
	Christian Brothers	Old Boys	1917, 1920	1918, 1929	2	1	1
	Eastern Suburbs	Tigers	1917	1997	24	8	16
	Fortitude Valley	Diehards	1909	1995	31	17	14
	Ipswich	Jets	1986	1997	2	0	2
	Logan (City)	Scorpions	1988	1997	0	0	0
	Northern Suburbs	Devils	1920	1997	22	13	9
	Past Brothers Brisbane	Leprechauns	1930	1997	19	9	10
	Redcliffe	Dolphins	1947	1997	10	4	6
	South Queensland (BRL)	Crushers	1994	1995	0	0	0
	Southern Suburbs	Magpies	1919	1997	17	8	9
	University	Students	1920	1933	2	2	0
	Western Suburbs	Panthers	1915	1997	18	10	8
	Wynnum-Manly	Seagulls	1951	1997	5	4	1

(BRL) = Brisbane Rugby League side to the Sydney Rugby League/Australia Rugby League Senior Grade side.

== Representative Brisbane Rugby League team ==
Selected players from the Brisbane Rugby League clubs, represented Brisbane in a representative team called Brisbane Capitals against various Sydney Rugby League clubs or against Sydney Capitals

== First-grade wins, losses, win percentage and draws ==
Teams in bold still existed during the at the end of the 1st-grade competition in 1994.

All Time Ladder
Pos	Team	1st season	Pld	W	L	D	W%
1	Valley-Toombul	1911	20	14	5	1	70.00%
2	Natives	1912	22	15	7	0	68.18%
3	**Fortitude Valley**	1909	1,382	831	506	45	60.13%
4	Ipswich B	1911	10	6	3	1	60.00%
5	Toowong	1914	11	6	5	0	54.55%
6	**Northern Suburbs**	1920	1,266	681	548	37	53.79%
7	South Brisbane	1909	58	31	27	0	53.45%
8	Fortitude Valley-Tweed Heads	1988	36	19	16	1	52.78%
9	Ipswich A	1910	19	10	8	1	52.63%
10	**Past Brothers Brisbane**	1931	1,126	569	519	38	50.53%
11	**Redcliffe**	1960	733	370	345	18	50.48%
12	**South Queensland**	1994	22	11	10	1	50.00%
13	**Western Suburbs**	1915	1,353	668	637	48	49.37%
14	**Eastern Suburbs**	1917	1,322	636	640	46	48.11%
15	**Southern Suburbs**	1919	1,286	612	638	36	47.59%
16	Past Brothers (Merthyr)	1917	182	86	84	12	47.25%
17	**Ipswich**	1986	171	80	82	9	46.78%
=18	Ipswich West End	1916	10	4	5	1	40.00%
=18	Wynnum	1914	10	4	6	0	40.00%
20	Toombul	1909	18	7	10	1	38.89%
21	University	1920	200	76	116	8	38.00%
22	Bulimba	1915	19	7	9	3	36.84%
23	**Wynnum-Manly**	1951	852	303	530	19	35.56%
=24	West End	1913	48	16	29	3	33.33%
=24	North Brisbane	1909	33	11	22	0	33.33%
=24	East Brisbane	1910	9	3	6	0	33.33%
=24	Kurilpa	1912	9	3	6	0	33.33%
=24	West End-Grammars	1920	6	2	3	1	33.33%
=29	Westerns	1917	22	7	13	2	31.82%
=29	**Brisbane**	1994	22	7	15	0	31.82%
31	Woolloongabba	1912	28	8	14	6	28.57%
32	South Coast	1952	35	8	27	0	22.86%
33	**Logan**	1988	130	28	94	8	21.54%
34	Railways	1913	39	8	30	1	20.51%
35	Wynnum District	1931	56	8	46	2	14.29%
36	Ipswich Starlights	1916	9	1	7	1	11.11%
37	Wattles	1916	12	1	10	1	08.33%
=38	Bulimba-Railways	1920	4	0	4	0	00.00%
=38	South Brisbane United	1911	7	0	7	0	00.00%

== Grand Final results ==
Season	Grand Final Information
Season	Premiers	Score	Runners-Up	Venue
1922	Western Suburbs*	20–9	Coorparoo	Brisbane Exhibition Grounds
1923	Coorparoo	13–2	Fortitude Valley	Brisbane Exhibition Grounds
1924	Fortitude Valley	11–8	Christian Brothers	Brisbane Exhibition Grounds
1925	Carltons	24–5	Coorparoo	Davies Park
1926	Christian Brothers	6–5	Coorparoo	Davies Park
1927	Northern Suburbs	13–11	Western Suburbs	Davies Park
1928	University Students	10–7	Carltons	Brisbane Exhibition Grounds
1929	University Students	12–11	Coorparoo	Brisbane Exhibition Grounds
1930	Carltons	19–8	Fortitude Valley	Davies Park
1931	Fortitude Valley	27–9	Northern Suburbs	Davies Park
1932	Western Suburbs	8–7	Northern Suburbs	Brisbane Cricket Ground
1933	Fortitude Valley	9–3	Western Suburbs	Davies Park
1934	Northern Suburbs	7–4	Western Suburbs	Davies Park
1935	Brisbane Brothers	11–9	Fortitude Valley	Brisbane Cricket Ground
1936	Western Suburbs	13–12	Fortitude Valley	Brisbane Cricket Ground
1937	Fortitude Valley	9–7	Western Suburbs	Brisbane Cricket Ground
1938	Northern Suburbs	16–10	Fortitude Valley	Brisbane Cricket Ground
1939	Brisbane Brothers	11–9	Northern Suburbs	Brisbane Cricket Ground
1940	Northern Suburbs	17–11	Brisbane Brothers	Brisbane Cricket Ground
1941	Fortitude Valley	13–7	Northern Suburbs	Brisbane Cricket Ground
1942	Brisbane Brothers	20–11	Southern Suburbs	Oxenham Park
1943	Brisbane Brothers	13–7	Fortitude Valley	Brisbane Exhibition Grounds
1944	Fortitude Valley	16–12	Northern Suburbs	Brisbane Cricket Ground
1945	Southern Suburbs	21–11	Northern Suburbs	Brisbane Cricket Ground
1946	Fortitude Valley	5–2	Eastern Suburbs	Brisbane Cricket Ground
1947	Eastern Suburbs	15–2	Southern Suburbs	Brisbane Cricket Ground
1948	Western Suburbs	14–8	Eastern Suburbs	Brisbane Cricket Ground
1949	Southern Suburbs	22–8	Eastern Suburbs	Brisbane Cricket Ground
1950	Eastern Suburbs	14–10	Western Suburbs	Brisbane Cricket Ground
1951	Southern Suburbs	20–10	Eastern Suburbs	Brisbane Cricket Ground
1952	Western Suburbs	15–14	Brisbane Brothers	Brisbane Cricket Ground
1953	Southern Suburbs	21–4	Eastern Suburbs	Brisbane Cricket Ground
1954	Western Suburbs	35–18	Brisbane Brothers	Brisbane Cricket Ground
1955	Fortitude Valley*	17–7	Brisbane Brothers	Brisbane Cricket Ground
1956	Brisbane Brothers	17–10	Western Suburbs	Brisbane Cricket Ground
1957	Fortitude Valley	18–17	Brisbane Brothers	Brisbane Cricket Ground
1958	Brisbane Brothers	22–7	Fortitude Valley	Brisbane Football Stadium
1959	Northern Suburbs	24–18	Brisbane Brothers	Brisbane Football Stadium
1960	Northern Suburbs	18–5	Fortitude Valley	Brisbane Football Stadium
1961	Northern Suburbs	29–5	Fortitude Valley	Brisbane Football Stadium
1962	Northern Suburbs	22–0	Fortitude Valley	Brisbane Football Stadium
1963	Northern Suburbs	18–8	Southern Suburbs	Brisbane Football Stadium
1964	Northern Suburbs	13–4	Brisbane Brothers	Brisbane Football Stadium
1965	Redcliffe	15–2	Fortitude Valley	Brisbane Football Stadium
1966	Northern Suburbs	9–6	Brisbane Brothers	Brisbane Football Stadium
1967	Brisbane Brothers	6–2	Northern Suburbs	Brisbane Football Stadium
1968	Brisbane Brothers	21–4	Eastern Suburbs	Brisbane Football Stadium
1969	Northern Suburbs	14–2	Fortitude Valley	Brisbane Football Stadium
1970	Fortitude Valley	13–11	Northern Suburbs	Brisbane Football Stadium
1971	Fortitude Valley	18–10	Eastern Suburbs	Brisbane Football Stadium
1972	Eastern Suburbs	16–15	Fortitude Valley	Brisbane Football Stadium
1973	Fortitude Valley	15–7	Redcliffe	Brisbane Football Stadium
1974	Fortitude Valley	9–2	Brisbane Brothers	Brisbane Football Stadium
1975	Western Suburbs	26–24	Redcliffe	Brisbane Football Stadium
1976	Western Suburbs	16–1	Eastern Suburbs	Brisbane Football Stadium
1977	Eastern Suburbs	17–13	Redcliffe	Brisbane Football Stadium
1978	Eastern Suburbs	14–10	Fortitude Valley	Brisbane Football Stadium
1979	Fortitude Valley	26–0	Southern Suburbs	Brisbane Football Stadium
1980	Northern Suburbs	17–15	Southern Suburbs	Brisbane Football Stadium
1981	Southern Suburbs	13–9	Redcliffe	Brisbane Football Stadium
1982	Wynnum-Manly	17–3	Southern Suburbs	Brisbane Football Stadium
1983	Eastern Suburbs	14–6	Redcliffe	Brisbane Football Stadium
1984	Wynnum-Manly	42–8	Southern Suburbs	Brisbane Football Stadium
1985	Southern Suburbs	10–8	Wynnum-Manly	Brisbane Football Stadium
1986	Wynnum-Manly	14–6	Brisbane Brothers	Brisbane Football Stadium
1987	Brisbane Brothers	26–8	Redcliffe	Brisbane Football Stadium
Brisbane Broncos enter the Sydney Rugby League, which begins a quick demise for the Brisbane Rugby League. However, it officially remains a top-flight competition along with the Sydney Rugby League as before
1988	Fortitude Valley-Tweed	17–14	Ipswich Jets	Brisbane Football Stadium
1989	Fortitude Valley	28–4	Ipswich Jets	Brisbane Football Stadium
1990	Fortitude Valley	17–16	Northern Suburbs	Brisbane Football Stadium
1991	Eastern Suburbs	25–10	Western Suburbs	Brisbane Football Stadium
1992	Western Suburbs	40–10	Eastern Suburbs	Brisbane Football Stadium
1993	Western Suburbs	18–12	Eastern Suburbs	Brisbane Football Stadium
1994	Redcliffe	24–18	Western Suburbs	Brisbane Football Stadium
The Brisbane Rugby League officially becomes a second-tier state competition when the Australian Rugby League Premiership is formed. Brisbane Broncos and South Queensland Crushers reserve grade teams enter the Brisbane Rugby League in 1994.
1995	Wynnum-Manly	32–24	Eastern Suburbs	Brisbane Football Stadium
Brisbane Broncos and South Queensland Crushers reserve grade teams leave the Brisbane Rugby League after 1995.
1996	Redcliffe	16–12	Southern Suburbs	Brisbane Football Stadium
1997	Redcliffe	35–6	Eastern Suburbs	Brisbane Football Stadium

- * = Team undefeated
- Although the Brisbane Rugby League took a significant financial and competitive downturn, it did not become a second-flight competition when the Brisbane Broncos entered the Sydney Rugby League in 1988. Rather, it officially lost top-tier status after the 1994 season, before the advent of the Australian Rugby League, in 1995.

=== Brisbane Rugby League Premiers (All Grades) (1922–1997) ===
Season	Premiers (Senior Grade)	Premiers (Reserve Grade)	Premiers (Third Grade)	Venue
1922	Western Suburbs*	Coorparoo	Carltons	Brisbane Exhibition Grounds
1923	Coorparoo	Northern Suburbs	Coorparoo	Brisbane Exhibition Grounds
1924	Fortitude Valley	Carltons*	Fortitude Valley	Brisbane Exhibition Grounds
1925	Carltons	Coorparoo	Northern Suburbs	Davies Park
1926	Christian Brothers	Western Suburbs*	Fortitude Valley*	Davies Park
1927	Northern Suburbs	Northern Suburbs	Coorparoo	Davies Park
1928	University Students	Christian Brothers	Western Suburbs	Brisbane Exhibition Grounds
1929	University Students	Coorparoo*	Western Suburbs	Brisbane Exhibition Grounds
1930	Carltons	Coorparoo	Western Suburbs*	Davies Park
1931	Fortitude Valley	Carltons*	Western Suburbs*	Davies Park
1932	Western Suburbs	Carltons	Fortitude Valley	Brisbane Cricket Ground
1933	Fortitude Valley	Western Suburbs*	Western Suburbs	Davies Park
1934	Northern Suburbs	Western Suburbs*	Western Suburbs	Davies Park
1935	Brisbane Brothers	Fortitude Valley	Brisbane Brothers	Brisbane Cricket Ground
1936	Western Suburbs	Fortitude Valley	Fortitude Valley	Brisbane Cricket Ground
1937	Fortitude Valley	Northern Suburbs	Fortitude Valley	Brisbane Cricket Ground
1938	Northern Suburbs	Northern Suburbs	Fortitude Valley	Brisbane Cricket Ground
1939	Brisbane Brothers	Southern Suburbs	Northern Suburbs	Brisbane Cricket Ground
1940	Northern Suburbs	Eastern Suburbs	Fortitude Valley	Brisbane Cricket Ground
1941	Fortitude Valley	Fortitude Valley	Southern Suburbs	Brisbane Cricket Ground
1942	Brisbane Brothers	Brisbane Railway	Southern Suburbs	Oxenham Park
1943	Brisbane Brothers	Fortitude Valley	Southern Suburbs	Brisbane Exhibition Grounds
1944	Fortitude Valley	Fortitude Valley	Southern Suburbs	Brisbane Cricket Ground
1945	Southern Suburbs	Southern Suburbs	Southern Suburbs	Brisbane Cricket Ground
1946	Fortitude Valley	Southern Suburbs	Eastern Suburbs	Brisbane Cricket Ground
1947	Eastern Suburbs	Western Suburbs	Brisbane Brothers	Brisbane Cricket Ground
1948	Western Suburbs	Fortitude Valley	Southern Suburbs	Brisbane Cricket Ground
1949	Southern Suburbs	Eastern Suburbs	Eastern Suburbs	Brisbane Cricket Ground
1950	Eastern Suburbs	Northern Suburbs	Western Suburbs	Brisbane Cricket Ground
1951	Southern Suburbs	Northern Suburbs	Western Suburbs	Brisbane Cricket Ground
1952	Western Suburbs	Northern Suburbs	Northern Suburbs	Brisbane Cricket Ground
1953	Southern Suburbs	Northern Suburbs	Brisbane Brothers	Brisbane Cricket Ground
1954	Western Suburbs	Fortitude Valley	Northern Suburbs	Brisbane Cricket Ground
1955	Fortitude Valley*	Brisbane Brothers	Western Suburbs	Brisbane Cricket Ground
1956	Brisbane Brothers	Northern Suburbs	Fortitude Valley	Brisbane Cricket Ground
1957	Fortitude Valley	Western Suburbs	Fortitude Valley	Brisbane Cricket Ground
1958	Brisbane Brothers	Fortitude Valley	Fortitude Valley	Brisbane Football Stadium
1959	Northern Suburbs	Redcliffe	Western Suburbs	Brisbane Football Stadium
1960	Northern Suburbs	Eastern Suburbs	Fortitude Valley	Brisbane Football Stadium
1961	Northern Suburbs	Southern Suburbs	Fortitude Valley	Brisbane Football Stadium
1962	Northern Suburbs	Redcliffe	Fortitude Valley	Brisbane Football Stadium
1963	Northern Suburbs	Northern Suburbs	Fortitude Valley	Brisbane Football Stadium
1964	Northern Suburbs	Northern Suburbs	Western Suburbs	Brisbane Football Stadium
1965	Redcliffe	Western Suburbs	Eastern Suburbs	Brisbane Football Stadium
1966	Northern Suburbs	Redcliffe	Northern Suburbs	Brisbane Football Stadium
1967	Brisbane Brothers	Northern Suburbs	Northern Suburbs	Brisbane Football Stadium
1968	Brisbane Brothers	Northern Suburbs	Northern Suburbs	Brisbane Football Stadium
1969	Northern Suburbs	Northern Suburbs	Fortitude Valley	Brisbane Football Stadium
1970	Fortitude Valley	Eastern Suburbs	Fortitude Valley	Brisbane Football Stadium
1971	Fortitude Valley	Northern Suburbs	Northern Suburbs*	Brisbane Football Stadium
1972	Eastern Suburbs	Northern Suburbs	Wynnum-Manly	Brisbane Football Stadium
1973	Fortitude Valley	Brisbane Brothers	Northern Suburbs*	Brisbane Football Stadium
1974	Fortitude Valley	Eastern Suburbs	Fortitude Valley	Brisbane Football Stadium
1975	Western Suburbs	Wynnum-Manly	Wynnum-Manly	Brisbane Football Stadium
1976	Western Suburbs	Western Suburbs	Wynnum-Manly	Brisbane Football Stadium
1977	Eastern Suburbs	Eastern Suburbs	Western Suburbs	Brisbane Football Stadium
1978	Eastern Suburbs	Redcliffe	Eastern Suburbs	Brisbane Football Stadium
1979	Fortitude Valley	Brisbane Brothers	Wynnum-Manly	Brisbane Football Stadium
1980	Northern Suburbs	Southern Suburbs	Southern Suburbs	Brisbane Football Stadium
1981	Southern Suburbs	Redcliffe	Redcliffe	Brisbane Football Stadium
1982	Wynnum-Manly	Redcliffe	Southern Suburbs	Brisbane Football Stadium
1983	Eastern Suburbs	Southern Suburbs	Eastern Suburbs	Brisbane Football Stadium
1984	Wynnum-Manly	Southern Suburbs	Redcliffe	Brisbane Football Stadium
1985	Southern Suburbs	Brisbane Brothers	Southern Suburbs	Brisbane Football Stadium
1986	Wynnum-Manly	Brisbane Brothers	Brisbane Brothers	Brisbane Football Stadium
1987	Brisbane Brothers	Brisbane Brothers	Redcliffe	Brisbane Football Stadium
1988	Fortitude Valley-Tweed	Redcliffe	Eastern Suburbs	Brisbane Football Stadium
1989	Fortitude Valley	Northern Suburbs	Redcliffe	Brisbane Football Stadium
1990	Fortitude Valley	Fortitude Valley	Brisbane Brothers	Brisbane Football Stadium
1991	Eastern Suburbs	Eastern Suburbs	Eastern Suburbs	Brisbane Football Stadium
1992	Western Suburbs	Eastern Suburbs	Not contested in 1992	Brisbane Football Stadium
1993	Western Suburbs	Wynnum-Manly	Redcliffe	Brisbane Football Stadium
1994	Redcliffe	Redcliffe	Redcliffe	Brisbane Football Stadium
1995	Wynnum-Manly	Redcliffe	Not contested in 1995	Brisbane Football Stadium
1996	Redcliffe	Eastern Suburbs	Eastern Suburbs	Brisbane Football Stadium
1997	Redcliffe	Redcliffe	Redcliffe	Brisbane Football Stadium

- * = Team undefeated

== Quotes ==
- "Well that is a tragedy, to be honest with you. There's no club identity at all now. If you don't follow the Broncos well who do you follow? That means you've got to follow a New South Wales side. I think I'm sure that's what McAuliffe didn't want to happen. But when they brought in the Queensland side into the NSWRL that was the end of the Brisbane Rugby League, as far as that was concerned. It should never have happened because as it turned out, if we did lose players from Queensland to go to New South Wales we had the State of Origin. We've been winning the State of Origin, and you can imagine if we were keeping our players, the club competition would be just as good as what it was when I was playing. But that is a tragedy as far as I'm concerned is that the people miss that club identity." -Barry Muir, in 2001, on the decline of the Brisbane Rugby League and the rise of the Sydney Rugby League.
- "Yeah well the crowd was great, they supported you wholeheartedly, they came along but it wasn't only down here on the football field it was on the streets up there. People would come up and talk to you, they'd stop you in the street and get your autograph and have a talk to you and wish you all the best and really support you in what you were doing and lifting the Club. There was four or five players here that were top-line footballers and we used to go up on the terrace and sell raffles in front of McCarthy's Jewellers store on the terrace and we'd do an hour there and then pop down to the Manly Hotel and do an hour there and then we'd pop down to Fishers (pub) and do an hour there. The players were prepared to do it because they were getting the support from this area and they would give it back on the playing field and however they could meet the people on the streets. I don't think anyone turned away from you, it was just one big happy family. We used to have like a barbecue after the game and there'd be 100 or 200 people that would turn up for the barbecue, we had it at various areas." -Lionel Morgan, in 2001, on the support of the Brisbane Rugby League in the Wynnum-Manly district.

== See also ==
- Queensland Cup
- Winfield State League
