= Norm Carr =

Australian rugby league footballer

Personal information
- Full name: Norman Carr
- Born: 20 February 1955 (age 71) Coffs Harbour, New South Wales, Australia

Playing information
- Position: Lock
Club
Years	Team	Pld	T	G	FG	P
197?–84	Western Suburbs
1985–86	Southern Suburbs	38	6	0	0	24
	Total	38	6	0	0	24
Representative
Years	Team	Pld	T	G	FG	P
1980–82	Queensland	4				0

Norm Carr (born 20 February 1955) is an Australian former rugby league footballer who played in the 1970s and 1980s. A Queensland State of Origin representative forward, he played his entire club career in the Brisbane Rugby League Premiership for Souths and Wests, winning grand finals with both.

== Biography ==
Born in Coffs Harbour, New South Wales, Carr played for Brisbane Wests in the Brisbane Rugby League. He scored a try in Brisbane's 1979 Amco Cup final loss to the Cronulla-Sutherland Sharks.

Carr's three-game sojourn in the Maroon jumper began off the bench in 1980, but didn't play as he wasn't called upon by coach John McDonald. He actually played in 1981. He was elevated to the starting XIII for the second and third games of the 1982 series. Carr played at lock forward as Queensland wrapped up the series with victories. Carr captained Souths Magpies to victory in the 1985 Brisbane Rugby League premiership, scoring a try against Wynnum-Manly in the grand final.
