= Logan Scorpions =

Defunct Australian rugby league club, based in Slacks Creek, QLD

Club information
- Full name: Logan Scorpions Rugby League Football Club
- Nickname(s): The Scorpions,
- Colours: Blue; Gold; White
- Founded: 1987; 38 years ago
- Exited: 2002; 23 years ago

Former details
- Ground(s): Meakin Park
- Competition: Queensland Cup, Brisbane A-Grade Rugby League
- 2015: 3rd
- Current season

Records
- Premierships: 0
- Wooden spoons: 3 (1988, 1989, 1993)
- Premierships (2nd grade): 0
- Wooden spoons (2nd grade): 1 (2002)

The Logan Scorpions were an Australian rugby league football club from the suburb of Slacks Creek in Logan City, Queensland. Due to financial difficulties, the club ceased operation at the end of the 2002 Queensland Cup season, and merged with the Souths Magpies to form a new team, the Souths Logan Magpies.

== History ==
The Scorpions made their debut in the third grade of the Brisbane Rugby League premiership (BRL) in 1987. After they made the grand final, which they lost to the Redcliffe Dolphins 4–18, it was decided to fully admit the club into first grade in 1988.

However, the Scorpions were never able to become competitive in the higher class of competition owing to financial difficulties not permitting them to recruit the best players available, a problem enhanced by the fact that all of the BRL's top talent had defected to the Brisbane Broncos or other Sydney-based NSWRL clubs. The Scorpions never made the semi-finals once in either the BRL First Grade or Queensland Cup; their most successful seasons being 1999 and 2000 when the club finished seventh out of twelve teams. They made the Brisbane A Grade grand final in 2000 but lost 10–28 to the Easts Tigers.

Logan's fortunes declined further in 2001 and 2002. In their final year they failed to win a single game in either the Queensland Cup or Brisbane A Grade, and suffered many huge losses, including losing 0–88 to the Redcliffe Dolphins at Dolphin Oval. At the completion of that season the football and leagues clubs were wound up, and a merger with the Souths Magpies to form the Souths Logan Magpies followed.

== Notable players ==
=== Representative players for Queensland Residents ===
- Paul Fisher
- Shaun Ireland
- Brendon Lindsay
- Brad Pike
- Shane Perry
- Carl Turner
- Alan Lowe

=== Other notable players ===
- Gary O‘Brien
- Brian Hegarty
- Brian Armstrong
- Michael Devlin
- Bernie Finch
- Aaron Stewart
- Billy Dart
- Alan Hughes
- Mal Hughes
- Dougie Hughes
- Paul Bartier
- Glen Haggath
- Sean Roberts
- Stephen Royston
- Matt Burgess (1996–98)
- Clinton Davis (1996–99)
- Martin Moloney (1996–99)
- Andrew Thompson
- David Pitt
- Phil Shilvock
- Royce Simms
- Ben Lowrie
- Damien Durnford
- Gareth Turton
- Brett Simmons
- Troy Clarkson
- Terry O’Regan

== International representatives ==
- (Australia) Sam Backo
