= Ian Pearce (rugby league) =

Australian professional rugby league footballer and coach

Ian "Bunny" Pearce
Personal information
- Full name: Ian Pearce
- Born: 5 February 1947 Blackbutt, Queensland, Australia
- Died: 1 December 1993 (aged 46)

Playing information
- Position: Fullback, Centre
Club
Years	Team	Pld	T	G	FG	P
1975–82	Redcliffe Dolphins	154
Representative
Years	Team	Pld	T	G	FG	P
1974–76	Queensland	8	0	20	0	40
1975	Brisbane	1

Coaching information
Club
Years	Team	Gms	W	D	L	W%
1977–78	Redcliffe Dolphins	46	31	0	15	67
1985	Redcliffe Dolphins	21	8	0	13	38
	Total	67	39	0	28	58

Ian Pearce (5 February 1947 – 1 December 1993), also known by his nickname Bunny, was an Australian rugby league footballer and coach. A Queensland representative in the pre-State of Origin interstate rugby league series, Pearce played club football for the Redcliffe Dolphins in the Brisbane Rugby League as a goal-kicking fullback in the 1970s and 1980s. Pearce is remembered as one of the club's greatest players, despite never winning a premiership.

== Background ==
Pearce was born in Blackbutt, Queensland on 5 February 1947. The son of a Benarkin forestry worker, Peace grew up in Blackbutt and played rugby league for the town's club in the South Burnett Rugby League as a goal-kicking centre, with whom he won the 1968, 1973, and 1974 SBRL senior finals. Pearce kicked the game-winning field goal in the 80th minute of the 1968 final to win 6–5 over Kilkivan-Goomeri, and took over captain-coaching duties of the Blackbutt-Kilcoy side for the 1974 competition from Les Clarke.

Pearce also played several games for the Wide Bay Bulls during his time at Blackbutt, including in the 1970 Gold Top Cup State Championship, a predecessor of the Winfield State League featuring most of the Queensland Country teams and a combined Brisbane side, where he scored a try in Wide Bay's 17–9 win over Ipswich. Another notable appearance with the Wide Bay side came during Great Britain's 1974 tour of Australia and New Zealand, where Pearce played in the centres in the Bulls' 12–24 loss to the Lions at Maryborough.

== Club career ==
Having won his final competition in Blackbutt in 1974, Pearce moved to the Redcliffe Dolphins the following year, where he was appointed captain of the side and would primarily play as a fullback. The Dolphins made the BRL Grand Final in Pearce's first year at the club, a game in which he scored a try and 6 goals, but Redcliffe ultimately lost 24–26 to Western Suburbs.

Pearce captained Redcliffe to the finals again in 1976, but the side were knocked out in an elimination final by Southern Suburbs, who had finished 6th on the ladder but defeated Wynnum-Manly in a playoff to reach the finals. Pearce's three penalty goals were Redcliffe's only points in the game, which had a final score of 14–6 with no tries being scored. Coach Barry Muir left the club after the 1976 season, leading to Pearce being appointed captain-coach for the following year.

As captain-coach, Pearce led Redcliffe to a minor premiership and grand final in 1977, winning the Ira Berk Datsun player of the year award, though the Dolphins would lose the grand final 13–17 to Eastern Suburbs.

Pearce retained his captain-coach role in 1978, where Redcliffe won another minor premiership but were knocked out of the preliminary final in a 13–17 loss to Fortitude Valley. The match drew a crowd of 18,000, the largest of the season before the grand final, and was ultimately decided by goal kicks, as each team scored three tries (including one to a young Wally Lewis). Valleys winger Mick Neill kicked four goals, while Pearce only managed two from four at more difficult angles. Despite the disappointing finish to the season, Pearce won the Ira Berk Datsun player of the year award again in 1978, along with the prestigious Rothmans Medal, and finished as the BRL's top points scorer that year, beating the likes of Neill and Mal Meninga. Pearce's 266 points in 1978 is the record for most points scored in a BRL season, and he was the first Redcliffe player to win the Rothmans Medal.

Pearce's time as captain-coach came to an end in 1979, when former Redcliffe player Ron Raper returned to coach the club after leading Western Suburbs to two premierships. Pearce retained the captaincy, but Redcliffe missed the finals for the first time in five years, finishing sixth on the ladder. After missing the finals again in 1980, by just 3 competition points, the club turned to Queensland coach and former Redcliffe great Arthur Beetson, who was named as captain-coach for the 1981 season. This was the only year of Pearce's first-grade career in which he did not captain the Redcliffe side, which finished only one competition point behind minor premiers Southern Suburbs. The Dolphins beat Souths 21–10 in the semi-finals, with Pearce scoring a try and 6 goals, but Souths would knock Wynnum-Manly out of the preliminary final to face Redcliffe again in the grand final. Redcliffe would lose the grand final 13–9, but Pearce was recognized as the runners'-up best player, scoring their only points with a try and 3 goals.

Pearce led Redcliffe for the first two games of the 1982 Woolies Pre-season before being sidelined for 10 weeks with a knee injury, returning in round 1 of the regular season after missing the remainder of the pre-season and the Winfield State League, including Redcliffe's 15–23 final loss to Eastern Suburbs. Pearce was sidelined after Round 3, being replaced as fullback by Trevor Benson and as captain by hooker Bob Jones. He returned on the wing in round 14, scoring a try and 3 goals. Pearce played his final game of rugby league at fullback in Redcliffe's 0-35 semi-final loss to Wynnum-Manly.

== Representative career ==
Pearce's first representative appearance came while he was still playing for Wide Bay and Blackbutt, when he was selected for the Queensland Country side in the annual City v Country match.

In 1973, Pearce was selected as a reserve for the Queensland rugby league team, in the event that Valleys centre Gerry Fitzpatrick was unable to play, though Fitzpatrick passed a late fitness test and Pearce did not get an opportunity to take the field. He was first named in the Queensland starting side in 1974, where he played all three games of the series at fullback, kicking 9 goals including Queensland's only points in game 3, a 4–4 draw in which no tries were scored. Pearce would also play for Queensland against Great Britain during their 1974 tour, having already played in the tour for Wide Bay.

Pearce was named as fullback and captain of the Brisbane rugby league team for the 1975 Thiess Toyota Country vs City match, to determine selections for that year's interstate series. After the Brisbane team won 51–2, no country players were selected for Queensland, while Pearce was named captain. Pearce would lead Queensland to a 14–8 win over New South Wales in the first game of the series, the first time Queensland had won an interstate match since 1970 and the last time they would do so before the introduction of the State of Origin selection rules. Pearce also played in the remaining two matches, both losses, kicking a total of 5 goals in the series.

Pearce initially retained his position as Queensland fullback the following year, though he lost the captaincy to Greg Veivers. After participating in the team's warm-up tour of central and north Queensland, Pearce would kick 2 goals in game one of the series before being replaced by Valleys fullback Alan Mills.

== Post playing ==
After retiring from playing in 1982, Pearce served as secretary manager of the Redcliffe Leagues Club, before accepting an offer to coach the side in 1985. The 1985 season was not successful for Redcliffe, however, with the side missing the finals for the first time since 1980, and Pearce was replaced as coach by Darryl Van de Velde.

Pearce was killed in a road accident on 1 December 1993, aged 46.

== Legacy ==
In 1995, Redcliffe awarded the first Ian Bunny Pearce Trophy for their highest points scorer of the season.

In 2008, Pearce was named at fullback in the Wide Bay region's team of the century.

In 2020, Pearce was named at fullback in the Redcliffe Dolphins' best all-time team.

In 2022, Pearce was named the fifth greatest Redcliffe player in a list of the Dolphins' top 75 players for the club's 75th anniversary.

The Blackbutt sportsground has been renamed in Pearce's honour.

== Statistics ==
=== Club ===
Season	Team	Matches	T	G	F/G	Pts
1975	Redcliffe	25				
1976	Redcliffe	22				
1977	Redcliffe	23	8	86	0	196
1978	Redcliffe	23	15	118	0	266
1979	Redcliffe	21	11	61	0	155
1980	Redcliffe	19	5	95	0	205
1981	Redcliffe	16	6	62	0	142
1982	Redcliffe	5	2	10	0	17
Career totals		154				

=== Representative ===
Season	Team	Matches	T	G	F/G	Pts
1974	Queensland	4	0	13	0	26
1975	Queensland	3	0	5	0	10
1976	Queensland	1	0	2	0	4
Career totals		8	0	20	0	40

=== Coaching ===
Season	Team	Matches	Wins	Draws	Losses	Win %	Notes
1977	Redcliffe	23	15	0	8	65.22%	Finished 1st (out of 8). Lost Grand Final to Eastern Suburbs.
1978	Redcliffe	23	16	0	7	69.57%	Finished 1st (out of 8). Lost Preliminary Final to Fortitude Valley.
1985	Redcliffe	21	8	0	13	38.10%	Finished 6th (out of 8).
Career totals		67	39	0	28	58.21%	
