= Des Morris =

Australian RL coach and former rugby league footballer

Personal information
- Full name: Desmond John Morris
- Born: 20 April 1948 (age 78)

Playing information
- Position: Prop, Second-row
Club
| Years | Team | Pld | T | G | FG | P |
|---|---|---|---|---|---|---|
| 1968–79 | Eastern Suburbs | 226 | 50 | 0 | 0 | 150 |
| 1980–81 | Wynnum-Manly | 34 | 4 | 0 | 0 | 12 |
| | Total | 260 | 54 | 0 | 0 | 162 |
Representative
| Years | Team | Pld | T | G | FG | P |
| 1969–79 | Queensland | 15 |

Coaching information
Club
| Years | Team | Gms | W | D | L | W% |
| 1982–85 | Wynnum-Manly | 79 | 56 | 1 | 22 | 71 |
| 1988–89 | Eastern Suburbs | 39 | 24 | 1 | 14 | 62 |
| | Total | 118 | 80 | 2 | 36 | 68 |
Representative
| Years | Team | Gms | W | D | L | W% |
| 1985 | Queensland | 3 | 1 | 0 | 2 | 33 |
- Relatives: Rod Morris (brother)

Desmond John Morris, OAM (born 20 April 1948) is an Australian former rugby league footballer, coach and administrator. He is the brother of former Queensland and Australian representative Rod Morris.

He played club football in Queensland for the Booval Swifts and Eastern Suburbs club of the Brisbane Rugby League, and represented his state on fifteen occasions. As captain-coach of Easts, Morris helped the club to success in the BRL Premiership in 1972, 1977 and 1978. During the 1979 Great Britain Lions tour Morris captained a Brisbane rugby league team featuring a young Wally Lewis on the bench that played against Great Britain at Lang Park.

In his first year after retiring as a player, Morris coached the Wynnum-Manly Seagulls to victory in the 1982 Brisbane Rugby League premiership. He did this again in 1984. For the 1985 State of Origin series Morris was appointed coach of the Queensland team, but lost two of the three matches that year so was dropped. That year he coached Wynnum Manly to a second consecutive Brisbane Rugby League premiership grand final, but lost to Souths.

He was chief executive officer of the Eastern Suburbs Tigers from 2007 to 2016, continuing an association with the club that dates back to 1968. He was also an Australian national selector.

Morris was awarded an Order of Australia Medal (OAM) in the 2021 Australia Day Honours, for "For service to rugby league."
