= 1908 South Sydney season =

New South Wales Rugby Football League

- NSWRFL rank: 1st (out of 9)
- Play-off result: Premiers
- 1908 record: Wins: 8; draws: 0; losses: 1
- Points scored: For: 194; against: 53

Team information
- Coach: Arthur Hennessy
- Captains: Arthur Hennessy; Edward Fry; John Rosewell
- Stadium: Royal Agricultural Society Showground

Top scorers
- Tries: Arthur Butler (8)
- Goals: Arthur Butler (11)
- Points: Arthur Butler (46)
1909 →

The 1908 South Sydney season was the first in the club's history. They competed in the New South Wales Rugby Football League (NSWRFL) Premiership, finishing as the inaugural Australian rugby league premiers.

== Ladder ==
	Team	Pld	W	D	L	B	PF	PA	PD	Pts
1	South Sydney	9	8	0	1	1	194	53	+141	18
2	Eastern Suburbs	9	8	0	1	1	183	90	+93	18
3	Glebe	9	7	0	2	1	106	63	+43	16
4	North Sydney	9	6	0	3	1	155	66	+89	14
5	Newcastle	9	4	0	5	1	151	116	+35	10
6	Balmain	9	3	1	5	1	86	113	−27	9
7	Newtown	9	1	1	7	1	70	148	−78	5
8	Western Suburbs	9	1	0	8	1	47	190	−143	4
9	Cumberland	8	1	0	7	2	38	191	−153	4*

- Cumberland deducted 2 points due to late entry into the competition.

== Fixtures ==
=== Regular season ===
Round	Opponent	Result	Score	Date	Venue	Crowd	Ref
1	North Sydney	Win	11 – 7	Monday 20 April	Birchgrove	3,000	
2	Western Suburbs	Win	42 – 7	Saturday 25 April	Royal Agricultural Society Showground		
2	Cumberland Fruit Pickers	Win	23 – 2	Saturday 9 May	Royal Agricultural Society Showground	20,000	
3	Eastern Suburbs	Loss	12 – 13	Saturday 16 May	Royal Agricultural Society Showground	3,000	
4	BYE						
5	Newtown	Win	31 – 3	Friday 30 May	Royal Agricultural Society Showground	800	
6	Glebe	Win	21 – 5	Saturday 20 June	Wentworth	1,500	
7	Newcastle	Win	30 – 11	Saturday 27 June	Royal Agricultural Society Showground	4,000	
8	BYE						
9	Balmain	Win	16 – 2	Saturday 25 July	Birchgrove	800	
10	Newcastle	Win	8 – 3	Sunday 8 August	Wentworth	200	

=== Finals ===
Semi-finals
15 August 1908 – Agricultural
Eastern Suburbs	23
North Sydney	10
15 August 1908 – Wentworth
South Sydney	16
Glebe	3

Final
29 August 1908 – Agricultural
South Sydney	14
Eastern Suburbs	12

== Statistics ==
Name	App	T	G	FG	Pts
Tommy Anderson	8	6	1	0	20
Arthur Butler	9	8	11	0	46
Harold Butler	11	4	3	0	18
William "Billy" Cann	5	6	0	0	18
John Cochrane	9	1	0	0	3
Arthur Conlin	8	2	2	0	10
Maxwell Coxon	5	1	0	0	3
Walter Davis	8	2	0	0	6
Bruce Douglas	1	0	0	0	0
Edward "Ed" Fry	9	2	0	0	6
Thomas Golden	1	1	0	0	3
Dick Green	11	6	8	0	34
William Harden	1	0	0	0	0
Arthur Hennessy	5	2	0	0	6
Fred Jarman	9	2	0	0	6
John Leveson	11	3	0	0	9
Arthur McCallum	2	0	0	0	0
William Neill	7	0	0	0	0
John Rosewell	8	1	3	0	9
Leo Senior	4	3	0	0	9
Frank Storie	8	6	0	0	18
George Wells	2	0	0	0	0
Richard Wylie	1	0	0	0	0
Totals	143	56	20	0	224
