= 1909 South Sydney season =

NSW Rugby League season

- NSWRFL rank: 1st (out of 8)
- Play-off result: Premiers
- 1909 record: Wins: 9; draws: 0; losses: 1
- Points scored: For: 210; against: 41

Team information
- Captains: Arthur Conlin; Arthur Butler
- Stadium: Royal Agricultural Society Showground

Top scorers
- Tries: Tommy Anderson (11)
- Goals: Arthur Conlin (10)
- Points: Arthur Conlin (43)
← 1908	1910 →

The 1909 South Sydney season was the 2nd in the club's history. Captained by primarily by Arthur Conlin, the club competed in the New South Wales Rugby Football League Premiership (NSWRFL), finishing the season repeating as Australian rugby league premiers.

== Ladder ==
	Team	Pld	W	D	L	PF	PA	PD	Pts
1	South Sydney	10	9	0	1	210	41	+169	18
2	Balmain	10	8	0	2	130	62	+68	16
3	Newcastle	10	5	0	5	144	93	+51	10
4	Eastern Suburbs	10	5	0	5	167	141	+26	10
5	Glebe	10	4	0	6	62	159	−97	8
6	Newtown	10	3	1	6	73	107	−34	7
7	North Sydney	10	2	2	6	104	157	−53	6
8	Western Suburbs	10	2	1	7	42	172	−130	5

== Fixtures ==
=== Regular season ===
Round	Opponent	Result	Score	Date	Venue	Crowd	Ref
1	Balmain	Win	4 – 0	Saturday 24 April	Birchgrove Oval		
2	Newcastle	Win	28 – 9	Saturday 1 May	Royal Agricultural Society Showground	500	
3	Newtown	Win	16 – 2	Saturday 15 May	Royal Agricultural Society Showground		
4	Eastern Suburbs	Win	22 – 10	Saturday 22 May	Royal Agricultural Society Showground	1,500	
5	Glebe	Win	29 – 2	Saturday 29 May	Royal Agricultural Society Showground	300	
6	Western Suburbs	Win	34 – 3	Saturday 19 June	Royal Agricultural Society Showground	800	
7	North Sydney	Win	37 – 5	Saturday 26 June	Royal Agricultural Society Showground	200	
8	Eastern Suburbs	Win	16 – 5	Saturday 10 July	Royal Agricultural Society Showground	2,500	
9	Glebe	Win	24 – 0	Saturday 17 July	Wentworth	300	
10	Newcastle	Loss	0 – 5	Saturday 7 August	Newcastle Showgrounds	3,000	

=== Finals ===
Semi-finals
14 August 1909 – Wentworth
Balmain	15
Eastern Suburbs	8
14 August 1909 – Agricultural
South Sydney	20
Newcastle	0

Final
18 September 1909 – Showground
South Sydney
Balmain	(forfeit)

== Statistics ==
Name	App	T	G	FG	Pts
Tommy Anderson	7	11	0	0	33
Arthur Butler	8	3	1	0	11
Harold Butler	11	3	2	0	13
William "Billy" Cann	8	8	0	0	24
Pat Carroll	6	1	0	0	3
Arthur Conlin	8	7	10	1	43
Maxwell Coxon	11	3	0	0	9
Walter Davis	9	3	5	0	19
George Dawson	2	1	0	0	3
Henry Fletcher	1	0	0	0	0
William Fry	4	1	0	0	3
Thomas Golden	5	1	0	0	3
Dick Green	10	1	8	0	19
George Hallett	10	7	0	0	21
Arthur Hennessy	1	0	0	0	0
John Leveson	10	3	1	0	11
Thomas McCann	1	0	0	0	0
William Neill	11	0	0	0	0
John Rosewell	8	1	0	0	3
Alexander Ross	5	2	0	0	6
Frank Storie	5	2	0	0	6
Hash Thompson	2	0	0	0	0
Totals	143	58	27	1	230
