= 1909 NSWRFL season =

Rugby league competition

- League: New South Wales Rugby Football League
- Teams: 8
- Matches played: 42
- Points scored: 975
- Premiers: South Sydney (2nd title)
- Minor Premiers: South Sydney (2nd title)
- Runners-up: Balmain
- Wooden spoon: Western Suburbs (1st spoon)
- Top point-scorer: Arthur Conlin (43)
- Top try-scorer: Tommy Anderson (11)
- Left to form local league: Newcastle

Second Grade
- Number of teams: 8
- Premiers: Eastern Suburbs
- Runners-up: Glebe

Third Grade
- Number of teams: 9
- Premiers: South Sydney Federal
- Runners-up: Rozelle

The 1909 New South Wales Rugby Football League premiership was the second season of Sydney's top-level rugby league football competition, Australia's first. Eight teams contested during the season for the premiership and the Royal Agricultural Society Challenge Shield; seven teams from Sydney and one team from Newcastle, New South Wales.

At the beginning of the season, the nearly broke NSWRFL had met and kicked out its founders Henry Hoyle, Victor Trumper and J J Giltinan. Part-way through the season, Edward Larkin was appointed full-time secretary of the NSWRFL.

Also in 1909 north of the border, the Queensland Rugby Football League got its club competition started for the rebel football code of rugby league.

== Teams ==
The teams that made up the 1909 premiership season were the same as the 1908 season with the exception of Cumberland who were dissolved, being unable to field a competitive team. Their last premiership match turned out to be a 45–0 loss at the hands of North Sydney on 25 July 1908, a game where the team had to "borrow" two of North Sydney's officials in order to make up a 13-man side. Seven of Cumberland's players ended up going to Western Suburbs the following year, but only three of these players were able to play another premiership match.

- Balmain, formed on 23 January 1908 at Balmain Town Hall
- Eastern Suburbs, formed on 24 January 1908 at Paddington Town Hall
- Glebe, formed on 9 January 1908
- Newcastle, formed on 10 February 1908 at Pike's Rooms, Bolton Street, Newcastle
- Newtown, formed on 8 January 1908
- North Sydney, formed on February 7, 1908, at the North Sydney School of Arts in Mount Street
- South Sydney, formed on 17 January 1908 at Redfern Town Hall
- Western Suburbs formed on 4 February 1908

Souths lost only one game in the regular season, to Newcastle in Newcastle, 3 days after the Novocastrians had beaten the New Zealand Māori team.

Glebe included Peter Moko, the first player of Polynesian background to play in the premiership.

Newcastle exited the League at the end of the season.

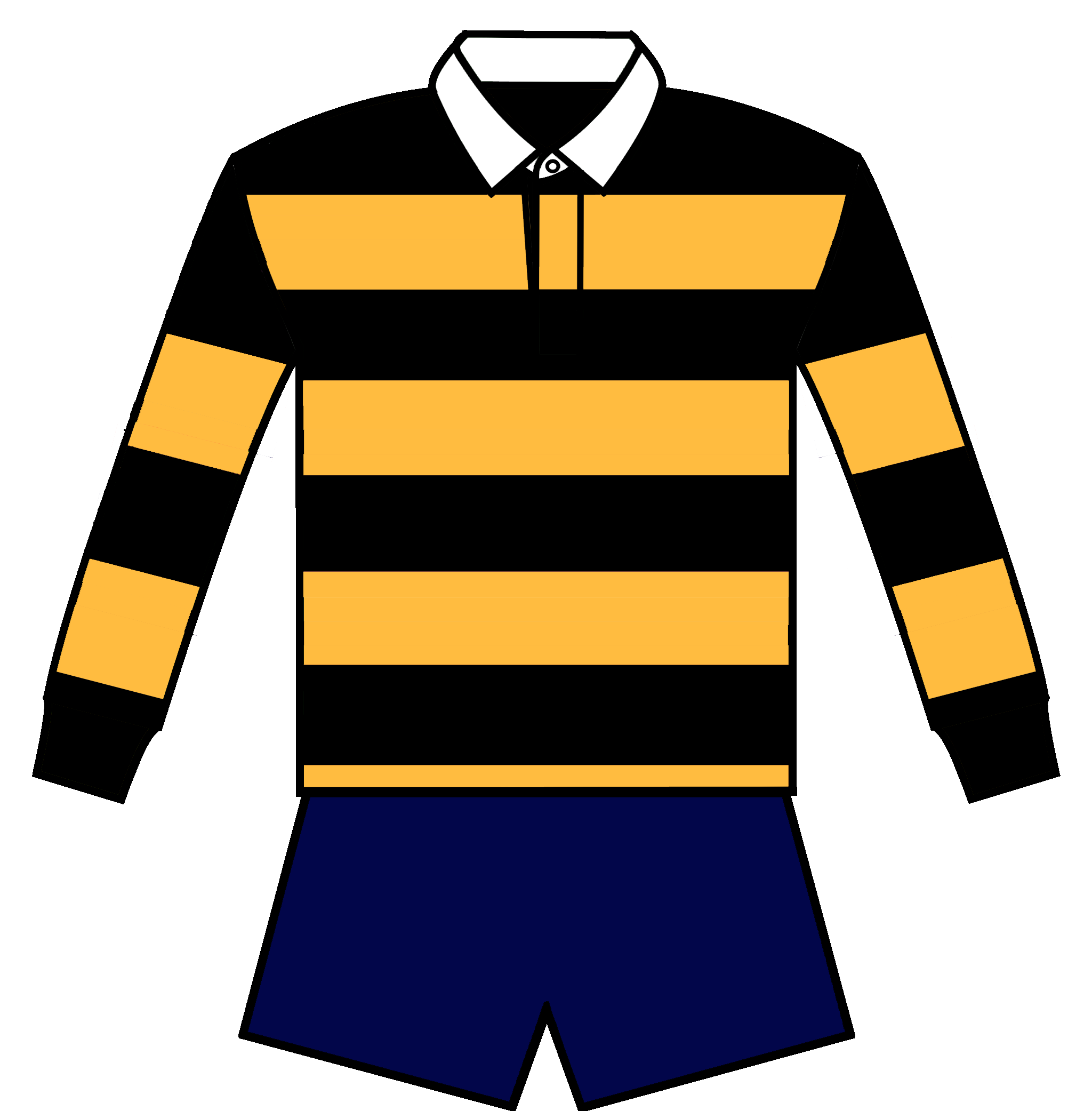
Balmain; 2nd season Ground: Birchgrove Oval; Coach: Robert Graves; Captain: Joe Regent

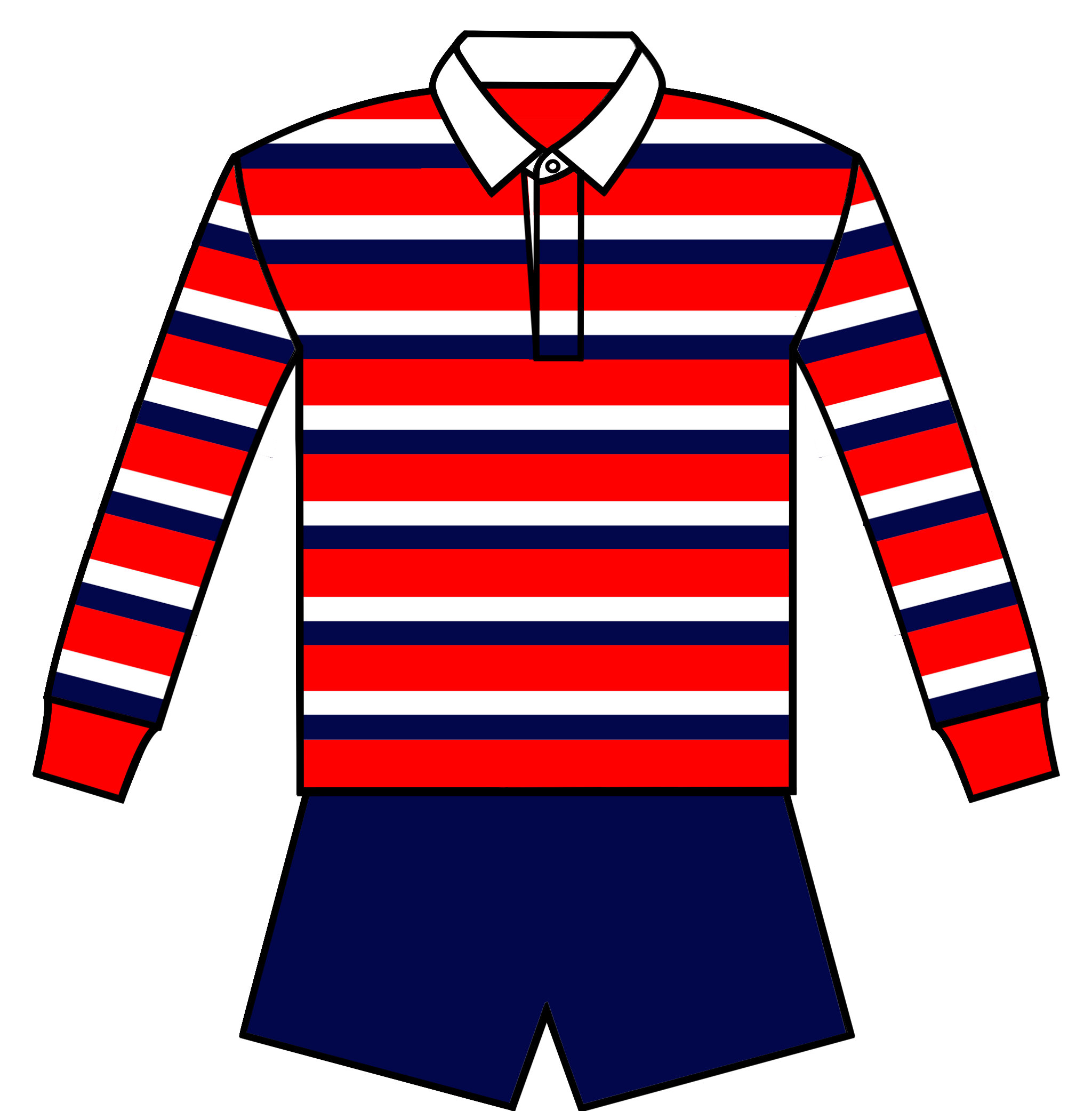
Eastern Suburbs; 2nd season Ground: RAS Showground; Coach: Captain: Albert Rosenfeld

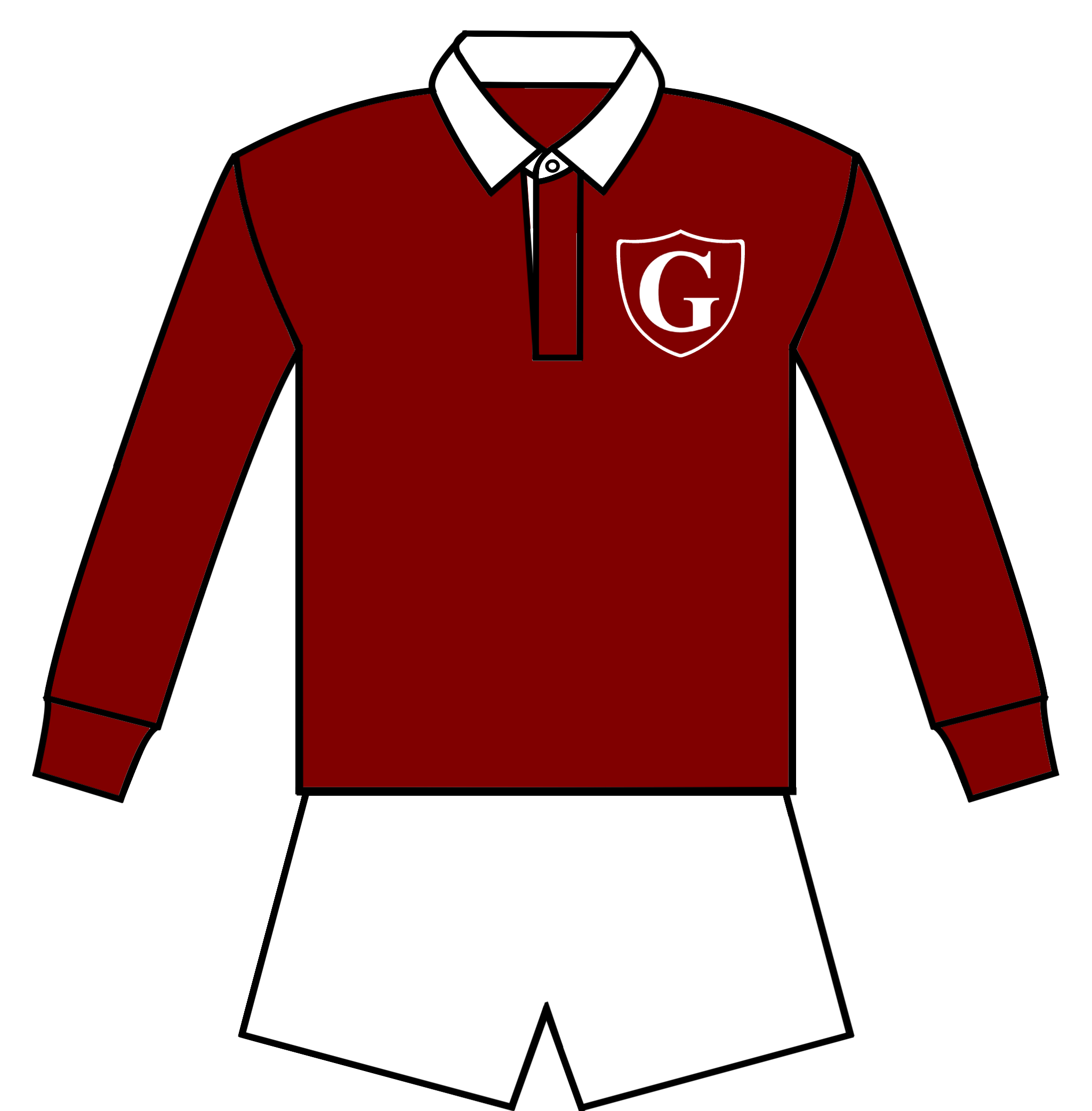
Glebe; 2nd season Ground: Wentworth Park; Coach: Captain: Alex Burdon

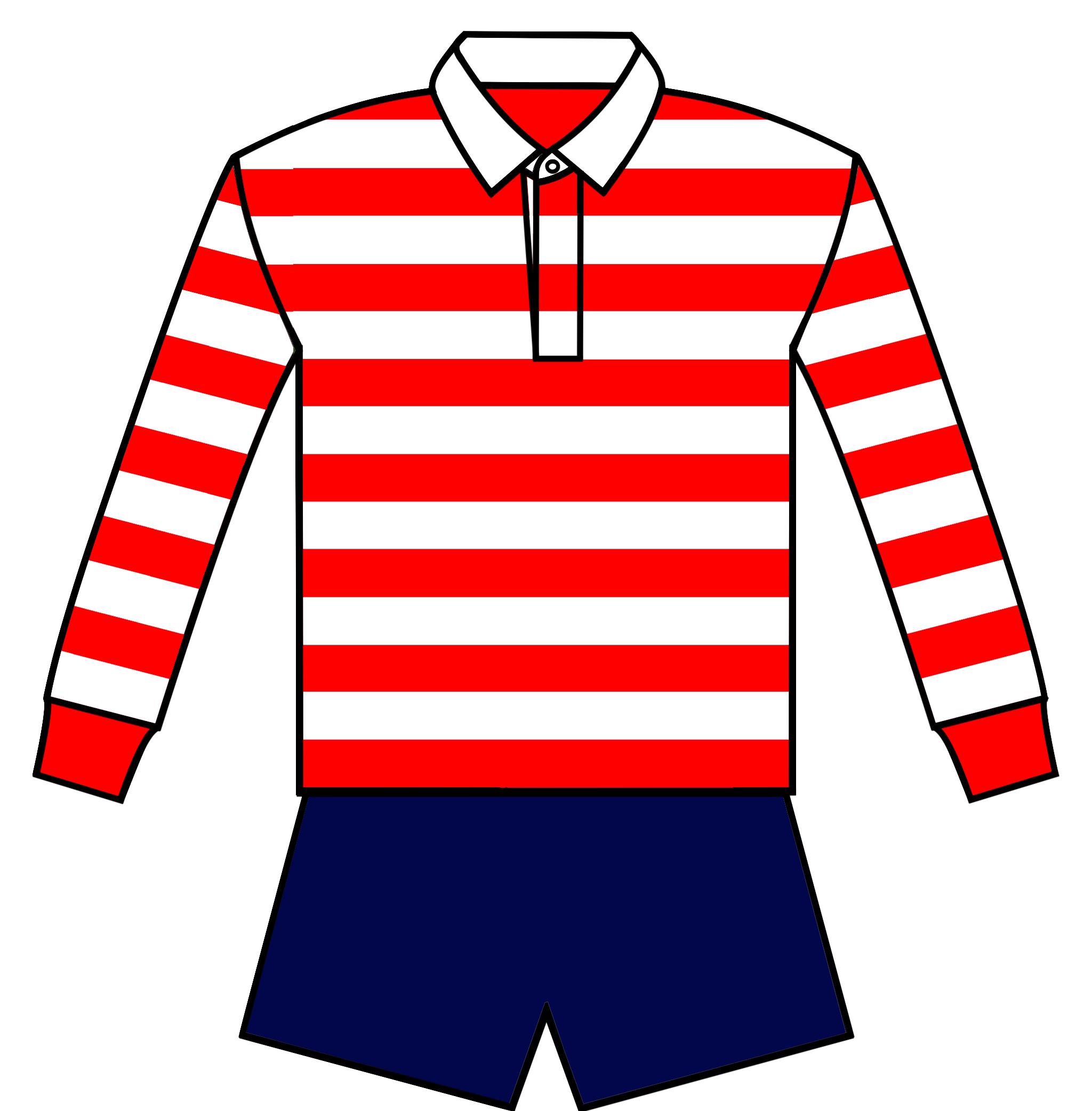
Newcastle; 2nd season Ground: Newcastle Showground; Coach: Captain: Stan Carpenter

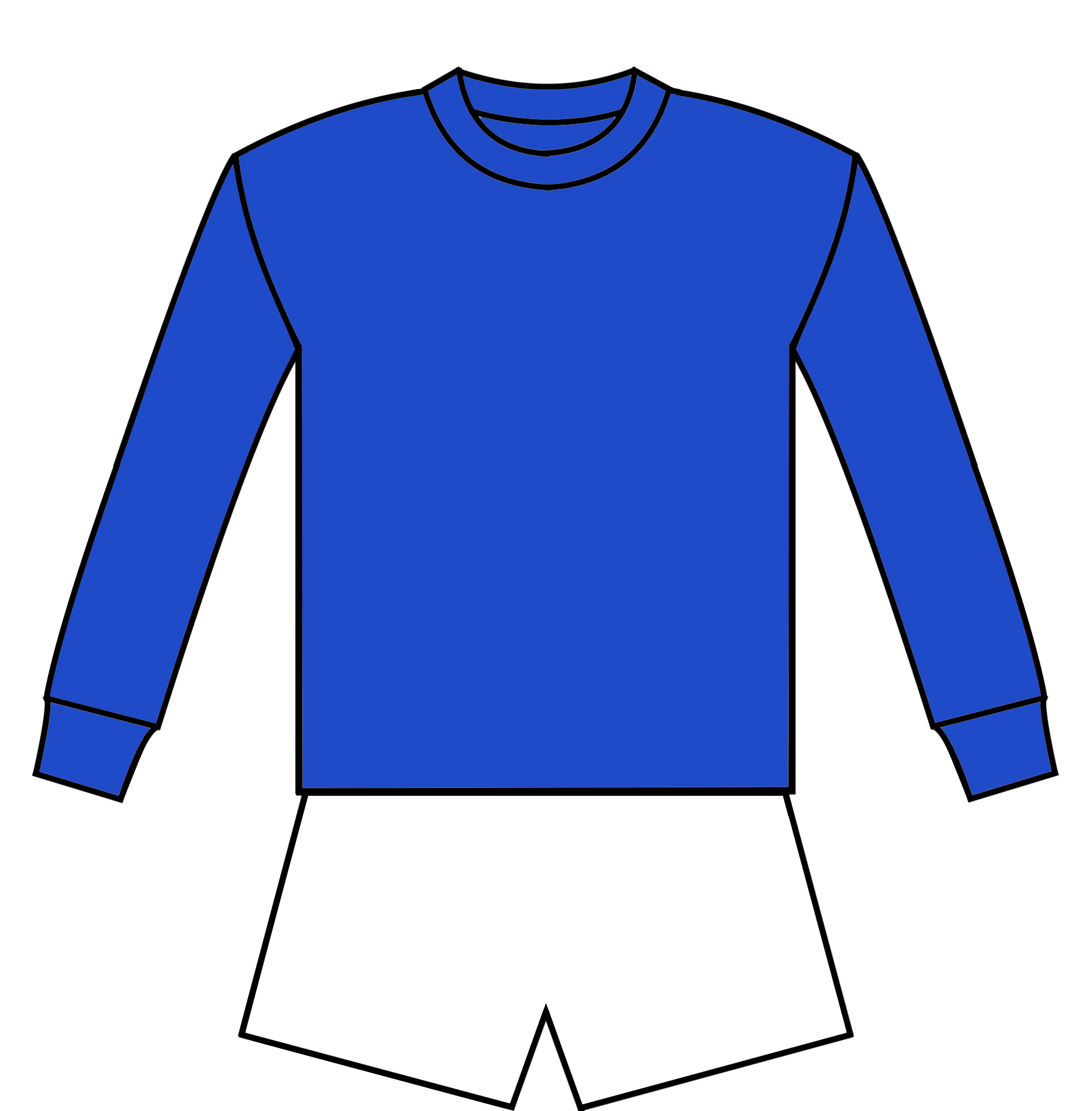
Newtown; 2nd season Ground: Wentworth Park; Coach: Captain: Bill Noble

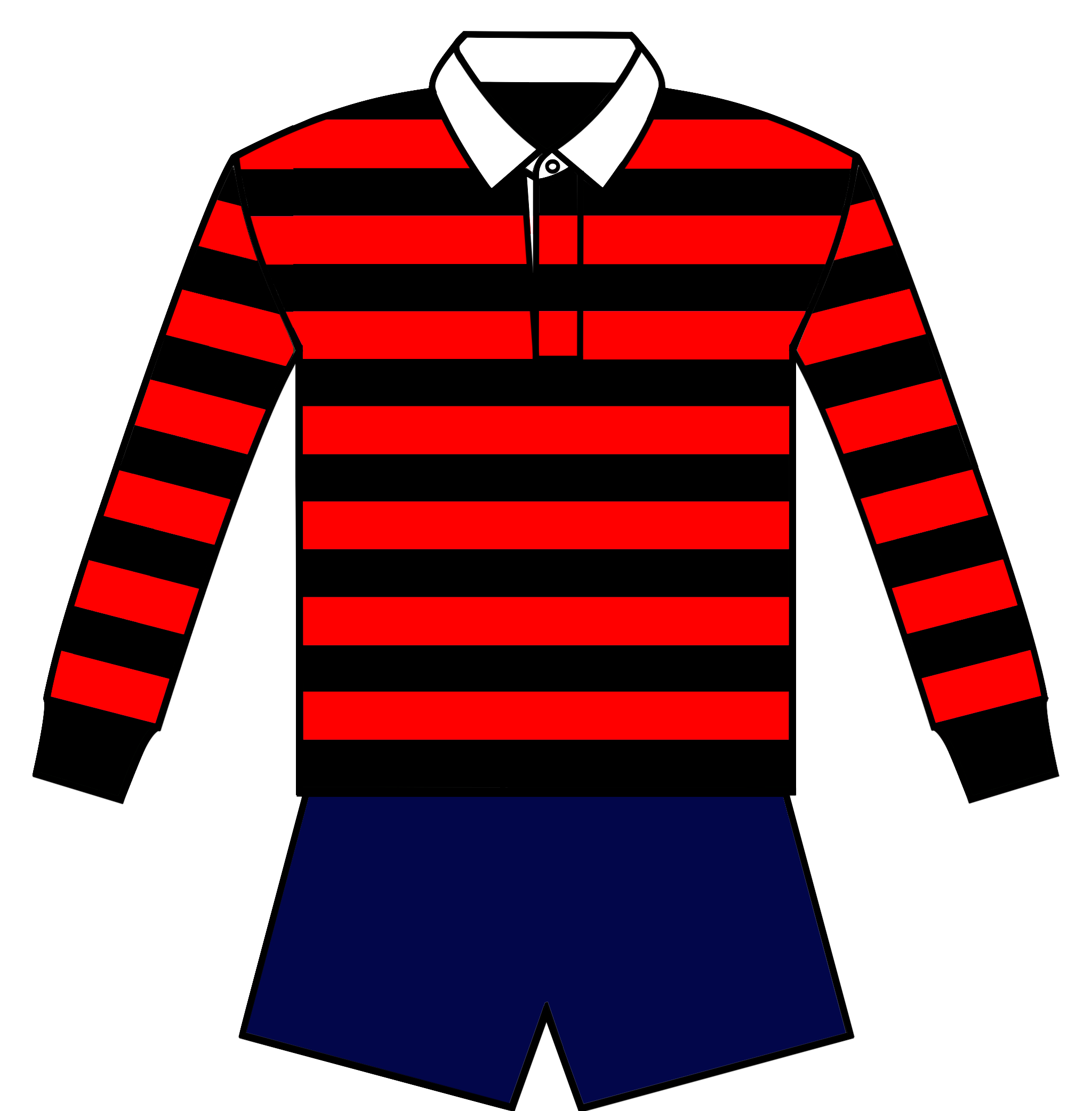
North Sydney; 2nd season Ground: Coach: Captain: Albert Broomham

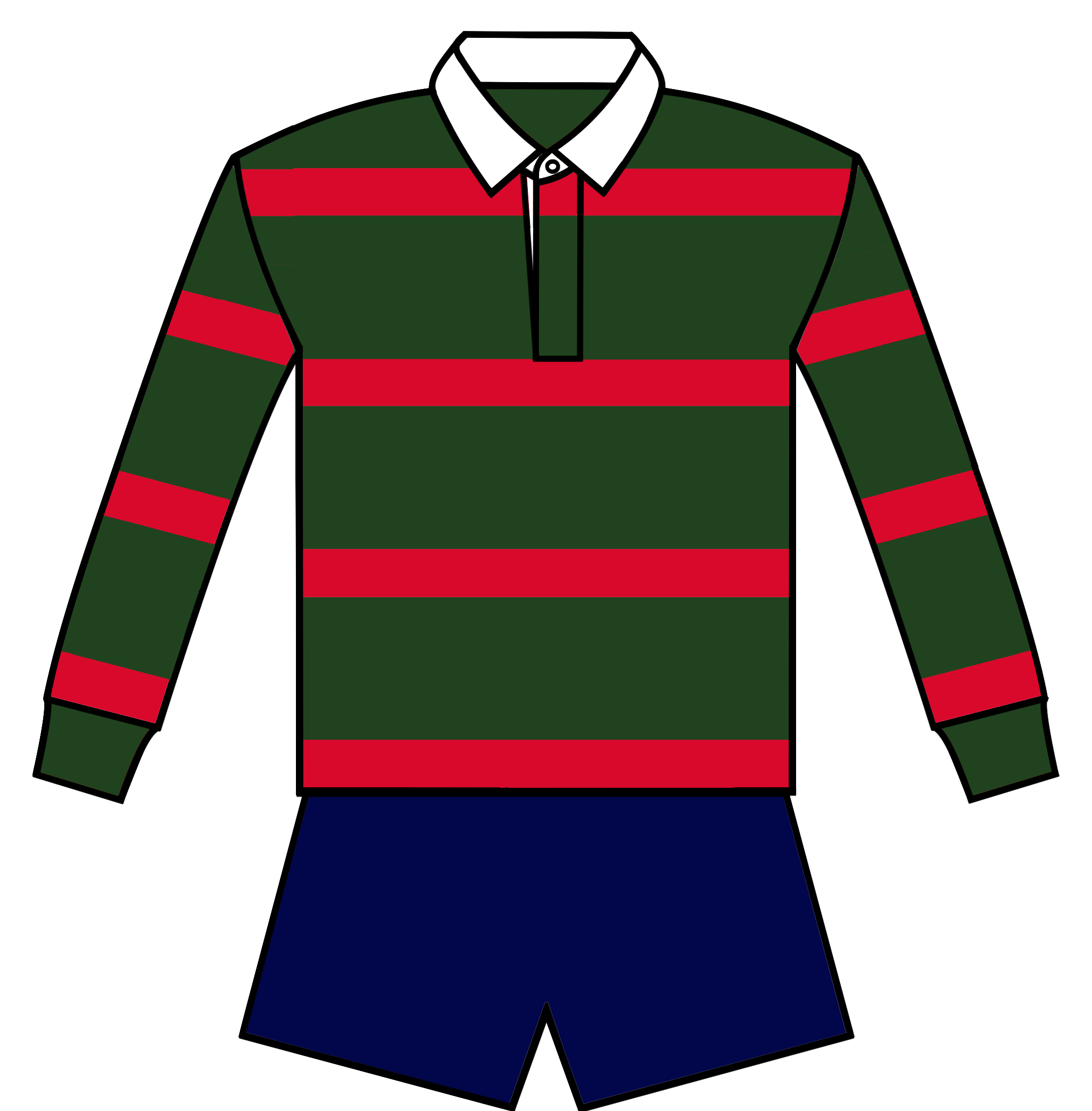
South Sydney; 2nd season Ground: RAS Showground; Coach: Arthur Hennessy; Captain: Arthur Conlin

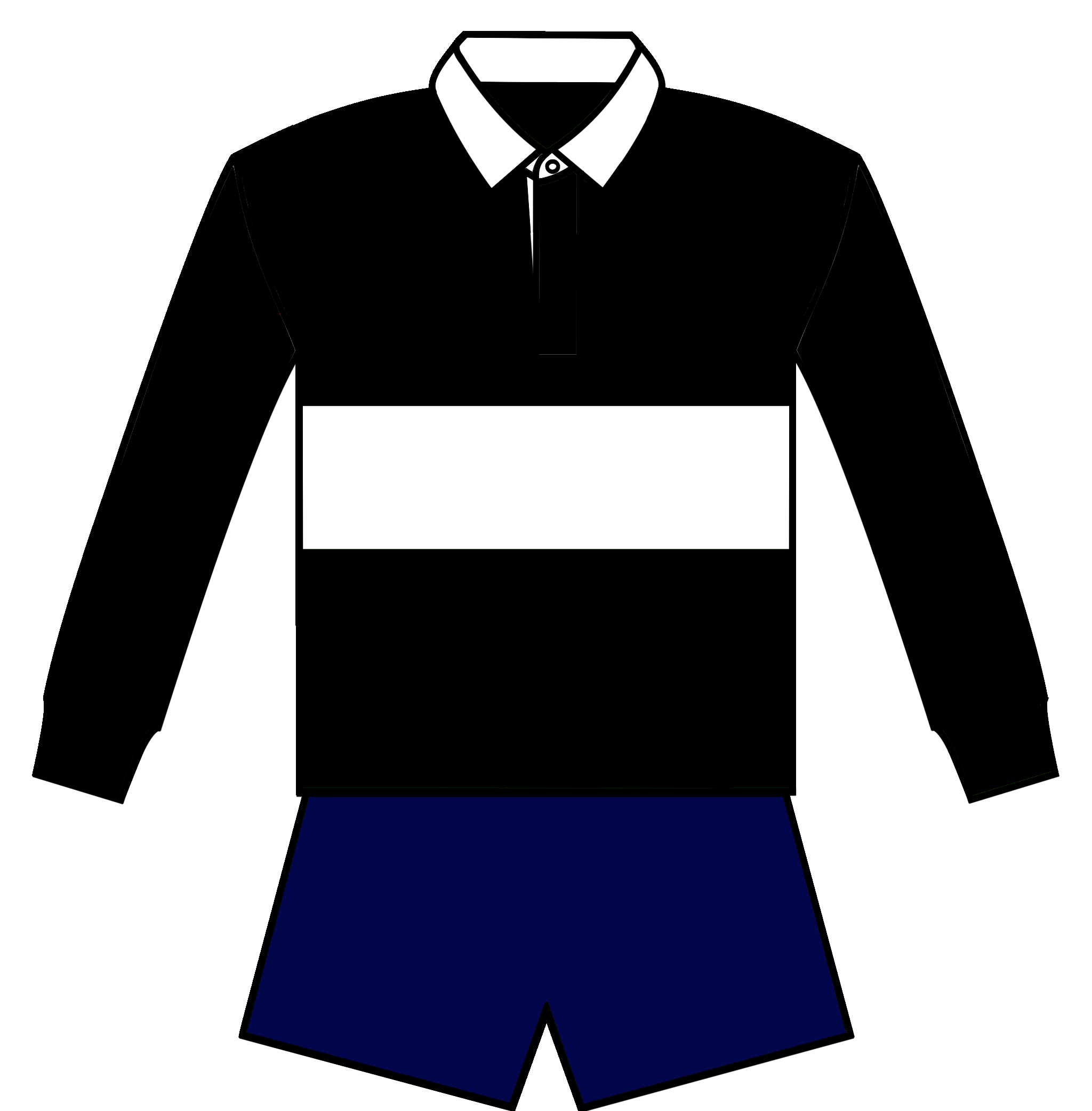
Western Suburbs; 2nd season Ground: RAS Showground; Coach: Captain: Tom Phelan

== Touring sides ==
During the season the New Zealand national side toured in June–July, followed by the second New Zealand Māori rugby league tour of Australia.

== Ladder ==
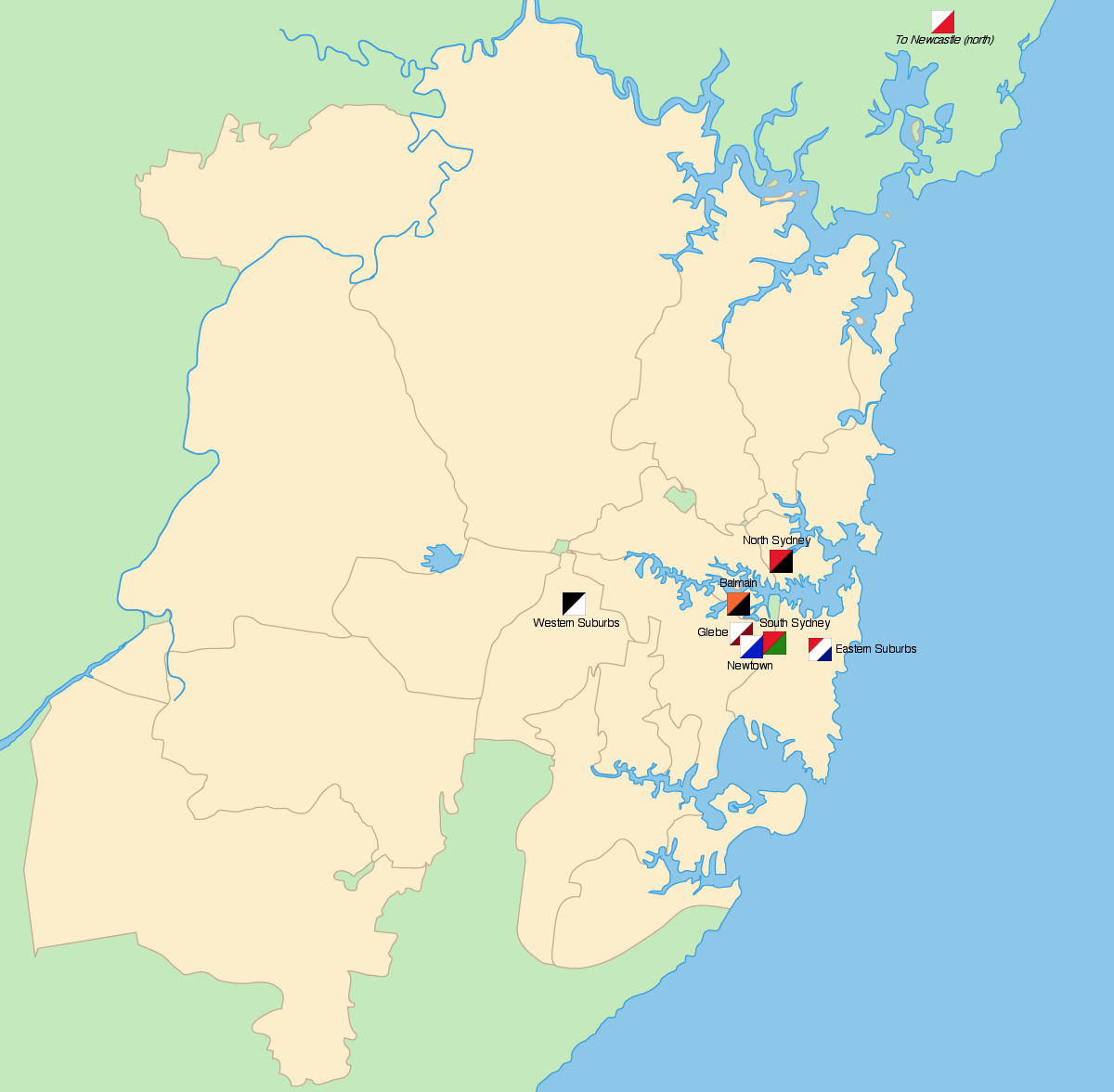
The geographical locations of the teams that contested the 1909 premiership across Sydney.

	Team	Pld	W	D	L	PF	PA	PD	Pts
1	South Sydney	10	9	0	1	210	41	+169	18
2	Balmain	10	8	0	2	130	62	+68	16
3	Newcastle	10	5	0	5	144	93	+51	10
4	Eastern Suburbs	10	5	0	5	167	141	+26	10
5	Glebe	10	4	0	6	62	159	−97	8
6	Newtown	10	3	1	6	73	107	−34	7
7	North Sydney	10	2	2	6	104	157	−53	6
8	Western Suburbs	10	2	1	7	42	172	−130	5

=== Ladder progression ===
- Numbers highlighted in green indicate that the team finished the round inside the top 4.
- Numbers highlighted in blue indicates the team finished first on the ladder in that round.
- Numbers highlighted in red indicates the team finished in last place on the ladder in that round

	Team	1	2	3	4	5	6	7	8	9	10
1	South Sydney	2	4	6	8	10	12	14	16	18	18
2	Balmain	0	0	2	4	6	8	10	12	14	16
3	Newcastle	2	2	2	2	2	4	6	6	8	10
4	Eastern Suburbs	2	4	6	6	8	10	10	10	10	10
5	Glebe	0	2	4	4	4	4	6	8	8	8
6	Newtown	0	2	2	4	4	4	4	4	5	7
7	North Sydney	0	0	0	2	3	3	3	3	4	6
8	Western Suburbs	2	2	2	2	3	3	3	5	5	5

== Finals ==
In 1909, semi-finals were played amongst the four highest-placed teams. Top-two finishers South Sydney and Balmain were able to win their respective semi-finals. However, after the New South Wales Rugby League had planned a match between the Australian rugby union and rugby league teams that would upstage the premiership final, both South Sydney and Balmain unofficially agreed to not play out a final. But unknown to Balmain, South Sydney turned up ready to play. The final was deemed to be a forfeit as a result, with South Sydney claiming their second premiership in as many years. Requests from Balmain for the match to be played at a later date were refused by the league. Conflict over whether there was an agreement between the two clubs not to play a final caused a deep-seated resentment towards Souths by Balmain which lasted many years. It was the most dramatic action ever taken by a rugby league club – the 1909 Balmain team forfeited the premiership final. Arguments have raged as to what led to Balmain's actions, and the day's events have caused the 'Tigers' and the South Sydney Rabbitohs to generally harbour nothing but ill-will towards each other ever-since.

The seeds of the dramatic events of 1909 lay in the years before rugby league was formed, back when Balmain and Souths were rugby union clubs.

In 1900, the Metropolitan Rugby Union (MRU) replaced the private clubs of the 1800s with district clubs.

This was done to more evenly distribute the talent between clubs, and to build upon the growing support for suburban based clubs.

While Balmain had use of 'the best ground in the colony' in Birchgrove Park [Oval], the MRU inexplicably ignored its 'home-and-away' scheduling for club matches, and refused to allocate South Sydney matches anywhere but at the SCG or Sports Ground.

Between 1900 and 1906, Souths and Balmain had met 14 times, yet the 'red-and-greens' had only twice been required to play at Birchgrove.

While most clubs trained indoors at night or on fields under moonlight, Souths and Easts had exclusive use of the lights of the Sports Ground. Understandably, other clubs, particularly Balmain and Norths felt that Souths and Easts were receiving favourable treatment.

The newspapers and opposing fans had come to call the Balmain club "the Balmainiacs". Unafraid to vent their feelings, especially at home games, Balmain were not the most popular club amongst Sydney 'rugbyites'.

When the opportunity came to join the newly formed rugby league in the early months of 1908, most rugby union clubs lost approximately half of their players and members. In Balmain's case, the league got just about everybody.

When the Balmain Union club held its first meeting of 1908, all the district's league supporters attended and voted against the election of every official for the coming season.

While they really had no cause to even be at the Union club's meeting, the presence of the league supporters prevented the Union club from being formed for the coming season. The MRU organised the follow-up meeting for the same night as the next Balmain league meeting, just so it could carry on its business.

By the start of the 1909 season, the NSWRL was in a dire financial crisis – its founding fathers, James Giltinan, Victor Trumper and 'Harry' Hoyle, all lost their positions.

Under the stewardship of North Sydney's Alexander Knox, the NSWRL convinced the clubs to forgo their gate receipts from matches, and hand it all over to the league.

It quickly became apparent to Knox that the only club attracting reasonable crowds was Balmain at Birchgrove Park. Consequently, Balmain were given a home game in almost every round.

As a result, they enjoyed great on-field success and climbed the premiership ladder. Balmain reached the Final against South Sydney.

However, as Souths had won the minor premiership by two points, the NSWRL play-offs system meant that Balmain had to beat them in the Final, and then beat them again in a second Final to claim the title. It seemed unlikely.

Balmain lobbied the NSWRL to schedule the Final at Wentworth Park, which was half-way between the two districts. The league refused, and put the match on at the Agricultural Ground – Souths home field.

Balmain's complaints were quickly overtaken by outside events when more than half of the 1908 Wallabies team suddenly defected to rugby league for a series of matches against the Kangaroos.

The Final was postponed indefinitely.

Knox publicly criticised the NSWRL officials who were involved in 'bringing-down' the NSWRU via paying huge sums to the Wallabies. Other officials did not see a problem with the league's actions, and Knox soon lost his position on the NSWRL.

Funded by entrepreneur James Joynton-Smith, the three 'Wallabies v Kangaroos' matches did not earn enough gate-money to fully cover his costs or those of the NSWRL. So a fourth game was arranged. To increase interest and gate-takings, the NSWRL scheduled the Final on the under-card.

Balmain were seemingly aggrieved at the demotion of importance of the Final, and asked the NSWRL to ensure it was played on a separate day. They also argued that their players' labour should not go towards paying money owed to Joynton-Smith and the NSWRL. The league refused and Balmain announced that they would not play.

On the day of the Final the Balmain players arrived outside the ground in the early afternoon, well before the scheduled kick-off time of 2 o’clock. They then picketed the entrance, endeavouring to convince patrons not to enter.

Despite very heavy rain and the protests of the Balmain footballers, enough of a crowd turned up to clear the debts of Joynton-Smith and the NSWRL. Balmain stuck to their word and did not appear on the field. Souths kicked off, picked up the ball and scored a try. The referee awarded them the match, and with it the 1909 premiership.

In the days that followed a public meeting was held at Balmain to decide what to do about challenging Souths being credited as premiers. It then became apparent what Balmain had been trying to achieve. The first speaker at the meeting was North Sydney's Alexander Knox. He had convinced Balmain to forfeit the Final in the hope that the NSWRL would not earn enough money to pay off its debts or be able to reimburse Joynton-Smith.

With the NSWRL bankrupted, Balmain and Norths officials would lead the formation of a new rugby league body – one in which they, and not South Sydney and Easts, would be the dominant office-holders. With little hope of winning the premiership, Balmain felt they had more to gain by causing the NSWRL to collapse.

Further meetings were held, attempting to instigate legal proceedings and investigate forming a new league, but they eventually stalled.

In the opening round of the 1910 competition, the NSWRL scheduled a 're-match' between Souths and Balmain at Birchgrove Park to appease the local supporters.

'The Balmainiacs' responded by establishing a record crowd for a NSWRL club match of over 5,000. The home team though were beaten 13–5 in a very tough and physical encounter.

The Referee thought it necessary to praise the Birchgrove crowd for their behaviour, offering: "Naturally they like to see their favourites win, and what district does not? In the present instance, however, their team had to play second fiddle, but as sports they took the defeat in good spirit, and liberally applauded the visitors".

At the first NSWRL meeting of 1910, Norths' Alexander Knox was banned from rugby league for life.

South Sydney: controversial 1909 Premiers.

Semi-finals
14 August 1909 – Wentworth
Balmain	15
Eastern Suburbs	8
14 August 1909 – Agricultural
South Sydney	20
Newcastle	0

Final
18 September 1909 – Showground
South Sydney
Balmain	(forfeit)

Members of the South Sydney side who showed up on Grand Final day and won by forfeit were:

Arthur Butler • Arthur Conlin (c) • Harry Butler • Howard Hallett • T.Anderson • J.Davis • Frank Storie • Ed Fry • Dick Green • Jack Coxon • Billy Cann • P.Carroll • Arthur Hennessy (coach)

Billy Cann

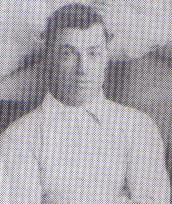
Ed Fry

Howard Hallett

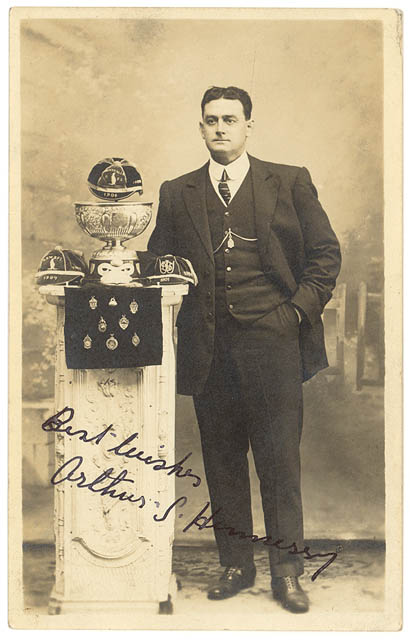
Arthur Hennessy

== Lower Grades ==
The NSWRFL held two lower grade competitions in 1909.

With varying consistency, results were published in newspapers: The Sydney Morning Herald, The Evening News, The Sunday Times, The Daily Telegraph and The Sunday Sun. The first three are currently available in digital format on the National Library of Australia's Trove website. The latter two newspapers are available on microfilm at the State Library of NSW. The results published in these newspapers have been used to compile the tables below, particularly The Sunday Sun which published the most lower grade results.

=== Second Grade ===
Eight teams competed in the Second Grade competition: Balmain, Eastern Suburbs, Glebe, North Sydney, South Sydney, Sydney and Western Suburbs.
Second grade followed the same draw as First Grade, with the exception that Sydney replaced Newcastle. Many but not all second grade matches were played on the same ground used later that day for first grade matches involving the same pairing of clubs.

1909 Second Grade table. Compiled from match results published in newspapers.
Team	P&RK	W	D	L	PF	PA	PD	WF	LF	NP	Pts
Eastern Suburbs	10	9	0	1	123	38	85	0	0	0	18
Glebe	10	8	0	2	171	21	150	0	0	0	16
Sydney	9	7	0	1	129	38	91	1	0	0	16
North Sydney	10	5	0	5	57	87	−30	0	0	0	10
Balmain	10	4	0	6	49	67	−18	0	0	0	8
Western Suburbs	6	2	0	2	29	52	−23	1	1	2	6
South Sydney	9	1	0	8	45	157	−112	0	0	1	4
Newtown	8	0	0	7	9	152	−143	0	1	1	2

League points: for win = 2; for draw = 1; for loss = 0.
Pld = Games played (excluding forfeits); W = Wins; D = Draws; L = Losses; PF = Points scored in matches; PA = Points conceded in matches; PD = Points difference; WF = Forfeits received; LF = Forfeits conceded; NP = Matches not played due to the probable withdrawal of Western Suburbs; Pts = Competition Points.
Fixtures = Number of fixtures.

Notes

a: The tally includes the estimated score (60 to 0) when Sydney beat a ten-man South Sydney side on 7 August.
b: Western Suburbs forfeited on 26 June and were not listed in fixtures after a match they did play on 10 July, so it is probable that they dropped out. This table assumes that two points were awarded to Newtown and South Sydney who would have played Western Suburbs.
c: The Sunday Sun reported that Western Suburbs received a forfeit from Newtown on 24 April and that the match was played. Some Newtown players went to the wrong ground. Players from Wests made up the numbers for Newtown. The points scored in this match, Wests 14 defeated Newtown 2, are excluded from the For and Against in this table.

Finals

The semi-finals were played on 14 August. Glebe 15 defeated Sydney 6 at Wentworth Park and Eastern Suburbs 14 beat North Sydney 0 at Birchgrove.

The second grade final was played on 4 September as a curtain-raiser to the first Wallabies v Kangaroos match. The two teams had not met since the opening weekend, when Glebe had won by 15 to 3. Eastern Suburbs reversed that result, winning the final, 11 points to 7, to claim the premiership.

=== Third Grade ===
Nine teams competed in the Third Grade competition: Balmain, Eastern Suburbs, Glebe, South Sydney and Sydney were joined by Drummoyne on 1 May and Rozelle on 22 May. South Sydney Federal were listed to play Newtown on 1 May and 15 May but their first actual match played appears to be on 22 May. All three new clubs began with a win.

North Sydney and Western Suburbs were listed to play in Third Grade on the season opening Saturday, 24 April, but no result was published and they were not subsequently mentioned in Third Grade during 1909.

The late withdrawals, late entries, missing results and multiple forfeits make it difficult to reconstruct an accurate competition table.

1909 Third Grade table. Compiled from match results published in newspapers.
Team	Pld	W	D	L	B	PF	PA	PD	WF	LF	Pts	Unknown	Fixtures
South Sydney Federal	7	6	0	1	1	188	9	179	1	0	16	1	9
Rozelle	7	6	0	1	1	95	22	73	1	0	16	0	8
Drummoyne	7	4	0	3	1	59	50	9	0	0	10	2	9
Eastern Suburbs	6	2	0	4	1	29	73	−44	2	0	10	1	9
Sydney	7	3	0	4	1	65	79	−14	0	0	8	2	9
Balmain	6	2	0	4	1	31	65	−34	0	0	6	3	9
Glebe	6	2	0	4	1	28	85	−57	0	0	6	4	10
South Sydney	5	1	0	4	2	17	125	−108	0	1	6	1	7
Newtown	1	0	0	1	1	6	10	−4	0	3	2	4	8

League points: for win = 2; for draw = 1; for loss = 0.
P&RK = Games played (excluding forfeits) where the result is known; W = Wins; D = Draws; L = Losses; PF = Points scored in matches where result is known; PA = Points conceded in matches where result is known; PD = Points difference; WF = Forfeits received; LF = Forfeits conceded; Pts = Competition Points from known wins, draws, byes and forfeits received; Unknown = Matches listed as fixtures where the result is not known; Fixtures = Number of fixtures.

Notes

- The nine matches listed as fixtures for which the result is not known are: 15 May (3) – Glebe v Drummoyne, South Sydney Federal v Newtown, Balmain v Sydney; 29 May – South Sydney v Glebe; 19 June (2) – Balmain v Newtown, Sydney v Glebe; 10 July – Glebe v Newtown and 17 July (2) – Drummoyne v Newtown and Eastern Suburbs v Balmain.
- South Sydney Federal received at forfeit from Newtown on 1 May.
- Balmain played Sydney on 12 June, winning 10 to 8. This was the only Third Grade fixture for that day, and the match was played as a curtain-raiser to an Australia v New Zealand match.
- Glebe played Drummoyne on 7 August, winning 7 to 5. The only other Third Grade fixture for that day was to be Eastern Suburbs v. South Sydney, but South Sydney forfeited.

Finals

The semi-finals were played on 14 August at the Royal Agricultural Ground. South Sydney Federal 16 defeated Drummoyne 0 and Rozelle 8 beat Eastern Suburbs 2. The third grade final was played on 21 August as a curtain-raiser to an Australia versus New Zealand Maori match, "A good game ended in a win for the South Sydney team by 2 points to nil. Turnbull kicked a penalty goal. As the points indicate the tussle was a close one all through."
