= 1910 South Sydney season =

Rugby League club season

- NSWRFL rank: 2nd (out of 8)
- Play-off result: Runners-up
- 1910 record: Wins: 11; draws: 0; losses: 3
- Points scored: For: 326; against: 109

Team information
- Captains: John Leveson; Arthur Hennessy
- Stadium: Royal Agricultural Society Showground

Top scorers
- Tries: Arthur McCabe (17)
- Goals: Arthur Conlin (18)
- Points: Arthur McCabe (53)
← 1909	1911 →

The 1910 South Sydney season was the 3rd in the club's history. The club competed in the New South Wales Rugby Football League Premiership (NSWRFL), finishing the season as runners-up.

== Ladder ==
	Team	Pld	W	D	L	PF	PA	PD	Pts
1	Newtown	14	11	1	2	260	92	+170	23
2	South Sydney	14	11	0	3	326	109	+217	22
3	Eastern Suburbs	14	9	2	3	248	116	+132	20
4	Balmain	14	8	0	6	153	190	-37	16
5	Glebe	14	6	0	8	175	194	-19	12
6	Annandale	14	5	1	8	145	200	-55	11
7	North Sydney	14	3	0	11	146	283	-137	6
8	Western Suburbs	14	1	0	13	115	386	-271	2

== Fixtures ==
=== Regular season ===
Round	Opponent	Result	Score	Date	Venue	Crowd	Ref
1	Balmain	Win	13 – 5	Saturday 30 April	Birchgrove Oval	6,000	
2	Glebe	Win	10 – 3	Saturday 14 May	Wentworth Park	2,000	
3	Eastern Suburbs	Win	14 – 10	Saturday 21 May	Royal Agricultural Society Showground	5,000	
4	Newtown	Loss	7 – 12	Saturday 28 May	Royal Agricultural Society Showground	15,000	
5	North Sydney	Loss	27 – 21	Saturday 25 June	North Sydney Oval	2,000	
6	Western Suburbs	Win	32 – 13	Saturday 2 July	Metters Stadium	1,000	
7	Annandale	Win	34 – 8	Saturday 16 July	Royal Agricultural Society Showground	3,000	
8	Western Suburbs	Win	67 – 0	Saturday 23 July	Royal Agricultural Society Showground	500	
9	North Sydney	Win	53 – 4	Saturday 30 July	Royal Agricultural Society Showground	600	
10	Newtown	Win	15 – 8	Saturday 13 August	Royal Agricultural Society Showground	14,000	
11	Annanadale	Win	19 – 2	Saturday 20 August	Royal Agricultural Society Showground	2,500	
12	Eastern Suburbs	Loss	8 – 3	Saturday 27 August	Royal Agricultural Society Showground	12,000	
13	Glebe	Win	22 – 2	Saturday 3 September	Wentworth Park	1,500	
14	Balmain	Win	16 – 7	Saturday 10 September	Birchgrove Oval	3,000	

=== Finals ===
Newtown 4 (Goals: Charles Russell 2)

drew with

South Sydney 4 (Goals: Jim Davis 2)

(Newtown finished as premiers as they had been minor premiers)

== Club records ==
On July 23, Souths recorded a 67–0 win over Western Suburbs in Round 8. This remains the club record for largest win margin in a game. It is also the largest win margin performed by Souths against a defunct NSWRL/NRL team (assuming the existing Wests Tigers are a separate entity to the Western Suburbs club).
