= Ed Fry =

Australian rugby footballer

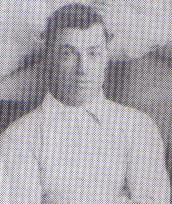
- Born: Edward Fry; 2 September 1880 Sydney, New South Wales, Australia
- Died: 27 March 1968 (aged 87) Rockdale, New South Wales, Australia

Rugby union career
- Position: Centre
Senior career
Years	Team	Apps	(Points)
1907	New South Wales		
- Rugby league career

Playing information
- Position: Centre
Club
Years	Team	Pld	T	G	FG	P
1908	South Sydney	9				6
1910	North Sydney	1
	Total	10	0	0	0	6
Representative
Years	Team	Pld	T	G	FG	P
1908	NSW	2				3
- Relatives: Fred Fry (brother)

Edward "Son" Fry (1879–1968) was an Australian rugby league and rugby union footballer. He was one of the founding players of rugby league in Australia at the time of the rebel code's breakaway from rugby union. He played for New South Wales in the very first rugby match run by the newly created 'New South Wales Rugby Football League' which had just split away from the established New South Wales Rugby Football Union.

== Rugby union career ==
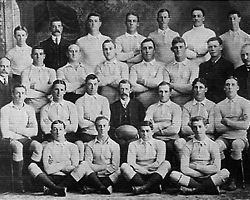
Fry seated 3rd from left, NSW team who met the All Golds in Sydney 1907

Fry was one of the New South Wales rugby union players who matched up against the first professional New Zealand team, Albert Baskiville's 'All Golds' in three matches in Sydney in August 1907. The New South Wales rugby union side had defeated the All Blacks 14–0 in their second of two matches in 1907 and so were expected to be tough opponents. The first professional game was played on the Royal Agricultural Society Ground to a sell-out crowd of 20,000. Played under rugby union rules, the All Blacks led 6–0 at halftime and closed out the match, winning 12–8. The game was deemed to be a great success, as the organisers had not expected more than 12,000 people. The second game, a mid-week game, was held in front of a crowd of 3,000. The All Golds, who had made several changes, defeated the "All Blues" 19–5. They then won the third match of the series 5–3 in front of a crowd of 8,000.

Ed Fry played in all three matches and along with the other Australian rebel players was promptly blacklisted by the New South Wales Rugby Union for breaching its fundamental principle of amateurism.

== Rugby league career ==
Along with Billy Cann, Arthur Hennessy, S. G. "George" Ball and John J McGrath, Fry was one of five founders of the South Sydney District Rugby League Football Club, attending meetings in October 1907. In 1908 Fry played for the Rabbitohs in the inaugural NSWRFL season, and was a member of the run-on side in South's first-ever game on 20 April 1908 (Easter Monday) at Birchgrove Oval against North Sydney. He played nine games at centre that season, scoring two tries and was a member of the club's first premiership winning team, playing in the August 1908 final against Eastern Suburbs.

In 1908 Fry was also selected in the first New South Wales side to play a national selection series against a Queensland side. The New Zealand AtoZ website reports that in the first ever interstate clash a particular Queensland tackle rendered one NSW player – Ed Fry – completely naked from the waist down although it did not stop him from scoring a try.

In the 1910 season, Fry turned out for North Sydney making just one first grade appearance. In retirement he remained actively involved with the South Sydney club through till his death in 1968.

Ed Fry was awarded Life Membership of the New South Wales Rugby League in 1914.

== Sources ==
- Whiticker, Alan & Hudson, Glen (2006) The Encyclopedia of Rugby League Players, Gavin Allen Publishing, Sydney
- Whiticker, Alan & Collis, Ian (2006) The History of Rugby League Clubs, New Holland, Sydney
- Heads, Ian and Middleton, David (2008) A Centenary of Rugby League, MacMillan Sydney
