= Australian rugby league premiers =

Winners of the top grade competition in Australian rugby league

The Australian rugby league premiers are the winners of the top grade competition in Australian rugby league, which is currently the National Rugby League. From 1908 until 1995, when the ARL Premiership was formed, there were two premiers, one each from Sydney and Brisbane. This occurred again in 1997 during the Super League war.

== History ==
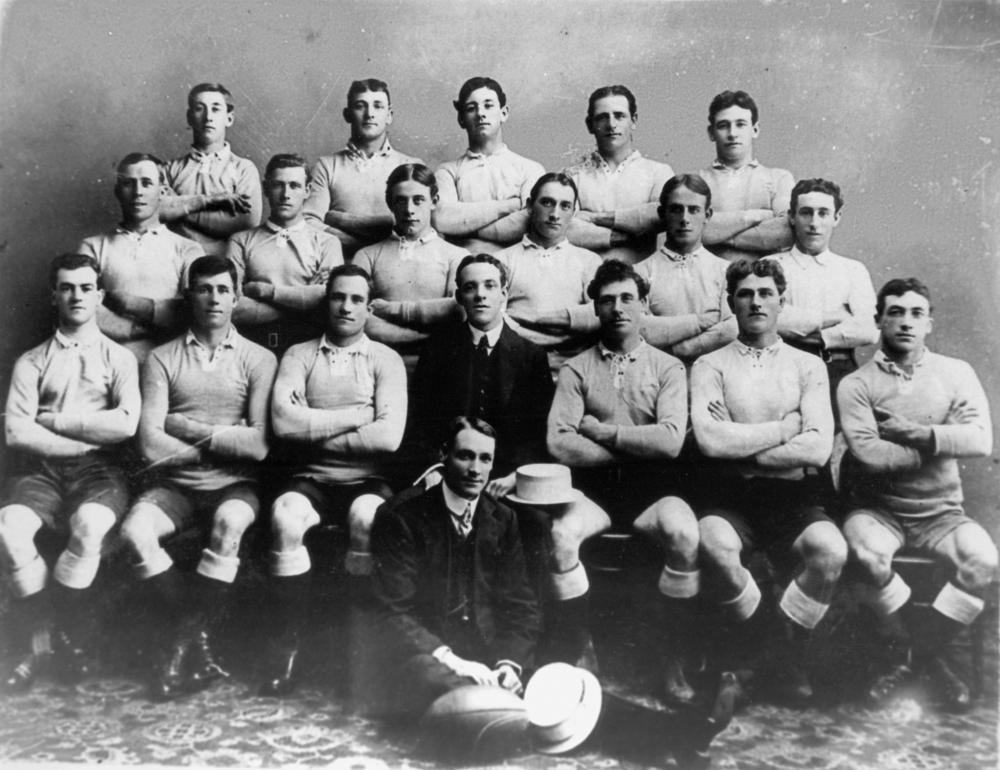
The 1910 New South Wales team was the "first to come north".

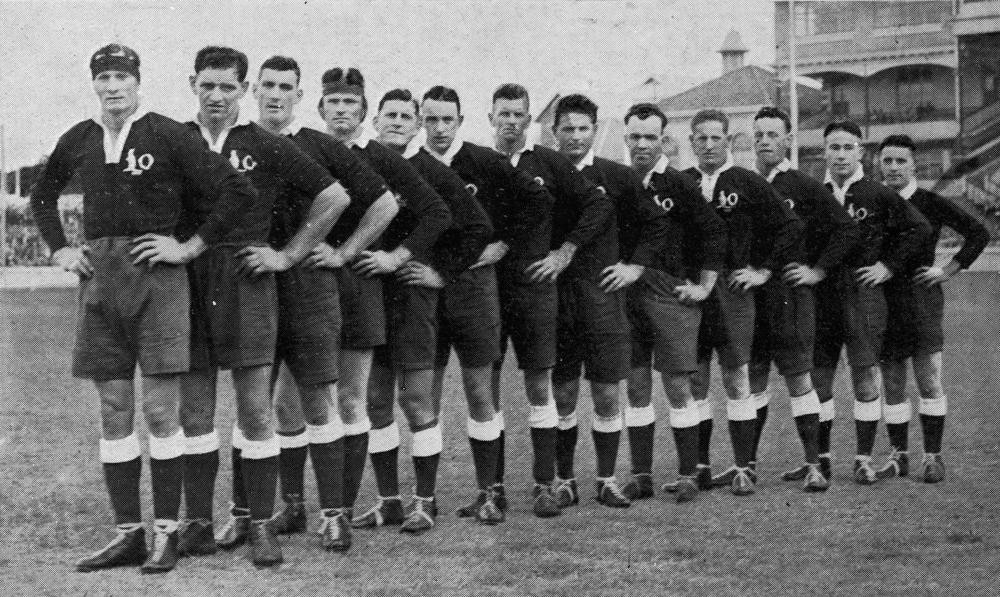
Queensland state team, 1931

From 1905, the states of Queensland and New South Wales were beginning to create Rugby League competitions, using the rules created in Northern England as a break-away game from Rugby Union. The New South Wales Rugby Football League was formally founded in 1907 with the first club competition starting in 1908; whilst the Queensland Rugby League was founded in 1908 with its first competition running in 1909.

The first season of rugby league in Australia commenced in New South Wales and was held in 1908 and was run by the New South Wales Rugby Football League. Queensland Rugby League was established in 1908 also; they ran their inaugural senior season in 1909. Both states ran parallel state competitions from that time. The game was adopted in both states in order to break away from the amateur rugby union competitions that existed at the time. The players had fallen out of heart with the administration of that game due to increased revenue from the game not being reflected in player allotments. At the end of the 1908 NSW season, South Sydney became the first team to win the New South Wales premiership. The Fortitude Valley Diehards, then known as Valleys, won the inaugural senior Queensland Rugby league season in 1909.

The New South Wales Rugby League and Brisbane Rugby League competitions ran parallel to each other for nearly the entire 20th century, with interstate competitions held annually. However, due to these competitions being mainly between state representative sides, apart from a few NSWRL premier v BRL premier competitions held in the 1920s, there was often no way to determine a national premier.

After 19 years of interstate-era dominance by New South Wales, the advent of State of Origin football in 1980 led to increased nationalisation of rugby league in Australia. After a failed proposal to play the first ever "National Championship" game in 1984 between the highly fancied BRL premier Wynnum-Manly Seagulls and the Canterbury-Bankstown Bulldogs of the NSWRL, it was decided that the Queensland Rugby League should form a team in 1986 to enter the NSWRL premiership. While the QRL slowly looked to create their own team, a private bid from the Brisbane Broncos consortium won the licence and the team entered the NSWRL in 1988. As a result, the standard of the Brisbane Rugby League decreased, and no BRL player was picked to represent Queensland or Australia afterwards; at this point most historians agree that the NSWRL became the premier competition nationwide.

Although the BRL was also a first-class competition, similar to Australian Rules Football, where the Australian Football League which evolved from the Victorian Football League keeps VFL statistics back to 1897 as its own history but considers South Australia's SANFL and Western Australia's WAFL as separate competitions, the National Rugby League counts the history of the NSWRL Premiership as its own but considers the Brisbane Rugby League separate. Therefore, BRL champions are considered Australian Rugby League premiers but are not NRL premiers.

Starting from 1995, the New South Wales competition began to call itself the Australian Rugby League. In 1997, an actual national competition was created by News Limited known as Super League, this was formed and run alongside the New South Wales and Queensland state premierships, a number of New South Wales competition teams being promoted to it. Later that year, an agreement was made between Super League and the New South Wales competition, following massive financial loss to both parties, to merge into a new National competition, known as the National Rugby League.

South Sydney, with 20 New South Wales State titles, have been crowned New South Wales premiers more times than any other team. Fortitude Valley Diehards won the Queensland competition 23 times during its period as a first class competition, giving them the most first-class titles in Australian rugby league. They are followed by St. George with 15 premierships, including a record 11 New South Wales premierships in a row between 1956 and 1966. At the opposite end of the spectrum, the Cronulla-Sutherland Sharks took nearly 50 years to win their maiden premiership in 2016 - longer than any other club in the history of the game (Parramatta's maiden premiership came in its 35th season in 1981).

There are three clubs currently playing in the National Rugby League that are yet to win a premiership; the Dolphins, New Zealand Warriors and the Gold Coast Titans.

Since 1908, counting the NRL and some of its predecessors (including the 1997 Super League Season), the following sides are among those that have never won a premiership:

- Adelaide Rams
- Annandale Dales
- Cumberland RLFC
- Glebe Dirty Reds
- Gold Coast Giants / Seagulls / Chargers
- Gold Coast Titans
- Hunter Mariners
- Illawarra Steelers
- Newcastle Rebels
- New Zealand Warriors
- Northern Eagles
- South Queensland Crushers
- University Students
- Western Reds

All BRL teams except the Ipswich Jets and Logan Scorpions won a premiership during its time as a top-level competition.

== List of premierships ==
=== List of NSWRL/ARL/NRL premiers (1908–present) ===
Season	Premiers	Score	Runners-up	Minor premiers	Wooden spoon
New South Wales Rugby League
1908	South Sydney	14 – 12	Eastern Suburbs	South Sydney	Western Suburbs (disputed)
1909	South Sydney (2)	No grand final	Balmain	South Sydney (2)	Western Suburbs (2)
1910	Newtown	4 – 4	South Sydney	Newtown	Western Suburbs (3)
1911	Eastern Suburbs	11 – 8	Glebe	Glebe	Balmain
1912	Eastern Suburbs (2)	No grand final	Glebe (2)	Eastern Suburbs	Western Suburbs (4)
1913	Eastern Suburbs (3)	No grand final	Newtown	Eastern Suburbs (2)	Western Suburbs (5)
1914	South Sydney (3)	No grand final	Newtown (2)	South Sydney (3)	Annandale
1915	Balmain	No grand final	Glebe (3)	Balmain	North Sydney
1916	Balmain (2)	5 – 3	South Sydney (2)	Balmain (2)	Western Suburbs (6)
1917	Balmain (3)	No grand final	South Sydney (3)	Balmain (3)	North Sydney (2)
1918	South Sydney (4)	No grand final	Western Suburbs	South Sydney (4)	Annandale (2)
1919	Balmain (4)	No grand final	Eastern Suburbs (2)	Balmain (4)	North Sydney (3)
1920	Balmain (5)	No grand final	South Sydney (4)	Balmain (5)	Annandale (3)
1921	North Sydney	No grand final	Eastern Suburbs (3)	North Sydney	Sydney University
1922	North Sydney (2)	35 – 3	Glebe (4)	North Sydney (2)	St George
1923	Eastern Suburbs (4)	15 – 12	South Sydney (5)	Eastern Suburbs (3)	Sydney University (2)
1924	Balmain (6)	3 – 0	South Sydney (6)	Balmain (6)	Newtown
1925	South Sydney (5)	No grand final	Western Suburbs (2)	South Sydney (5)	Newtown (2)
1926	South Sydney (6)	11 – 5	Sydney University	South Sydney (6)	St George (2)
1927	South Sydney (7)	20 – 11	St. George	South Sydney (7)	Sydney University (3)
1928	South Sydney (8)	26 – 5	Eastern Suburbs (4)	St. George	Newtown (3)
1929	South Sydney (9)	30 – 10	Newtown (3)	South Sydney (8)	Sydney University (4)
1930	Western Suburbs Magpies	27 – 2	St. George (2)	Western Suburbs Magpies	Sydney University (5)
1931	South Sydney (10)	12 – 7	Eastern Suburbs (5)	Eastern Suburbs (4)	Sydney University (6)
1932	South Sydney (11)	19 – 12	Western Suburbs Magpies (3)	South Sydney (9)	North Sydney (4)
1933	Newtown (2)	18 – 5	St. George (3)	Newtown (2)	Western Suburbs Magpies (7)
1934	Western Suburbs Magpies (2)	15 – 12	Eastern Suburbs (6)	Eastern Suburbs (5)	Sydney University (7)
1935	Eastern Suburbs (5)	19 – 3	South Sydney (7)	Eastern Suburbs (6)	Sydney University (8)
1936	Eastern Suburbs (6)	32 – 12	Balmain (2)	Eastern Suburbs (7)	Sydney University (9)
1937	Eastern Suburbs (7)	No grand final	South Sydney (8)	Eastern Suburbs (8)	Sydney University (10)
1938	Canterbury-Bankstown	19 – 6	Eastern Suburbs (7)	Canterbury-Bankstown	St George (3)
1939	Balmain (7)	33 – 4	South Sydney (9)	Balmain (7)	Newtown (4)
1940	Eastern Suburbs (8)	24 – 14	Canterbury-Bankstown	Eastern Suburbs (9)	Western Suburbs Magpies (8)
1941	St. George	31 – 14	Eastern Suburbs (8)	Eastern Suburbs (10)	North Sydney (5)
1942	Canterbury-Bankstown (2)	11 – 9	St. George (4)	Canterbury-Bankstown (2)	Western Suburbs Magpies (9)
1943	Newtown (3)	34 – 7	North Sydney	Newtown (3)	Canterbury-Bankstown
1944	Balmain (8)	12 – 8	Newtown (4)	Newtown (4)	Canterbury-Bankstown (2)
1945	Eastern Suburbs (9)	22 – 18	Balmain (3)	Eastern Suburbs (11)	South Sydney
1946	Balmain (9)	13 – 12	St. George (5)	St. George (2)	South Sydney (2)
1947	Balmain (10)	13 – 9	Canterbury-Bankstown (2)	Canterbury-Bankstown (3)	Parramatta
1948	Western Suburbs Magpies (3)	8 – 5	Balmain (4)	Western Suburbs Magpies (2)	North Sydney (6)
1949	St. George (2)	19 – 12	South Sydney (10)	South Sydney (10)	Eastern Suburbs
1950	South Sydney (12)	21 – 15	Western Suburbs Magpies (4)	South Sydney (11)	North Sydney (7)
1951	South Sydney (13)	42 – 14	Manly-Warringah	South Sydney (12)	North Sydney (8)
1952	Western Suburbs Magpies (4)	22 – 12	South Sydney (11)	Western Suburbs Magpies (3)	Parramatta (2)
1953	South Sydney (14)	31 – 12	St. George (6)	South Sydney (13)	Western Suburbs Magpies (10)
1954	South Sydney (15)	23 – 15	Newtown (5)	Newtown (5)	Parramatta (3)
1955	South Sydney Rabbitohs (16)	12 – 11	Newtown (6)	Newtown (6)	Western Suburbs Magpies (11)
1956	St. George (3)	18 – 12	Balmain (5)	St George (3)	Parramatta (4)
1957	St. George (4)	31 – 9	Manly-Warringah Sea Eagles (2)	St George (4)	Parramatta (5)
1958	St. George (5)	20 – 9	Western Suburbs Magpies (5)	St George (5)	Parramatta (6)
1959	St. George (6)	20 – 0	Manly-Warringah Sea Eagles (3)	St George (6)	Parramatta (7)
1960	St. George (7)	31 – 6	Eastern Suburbs (9)	St George (7)	Parramatta (8)
1961	St. George (8)	22 – 0	Western Suburbs Magpies (6)	Western Suburbs Magpies (4)	Parramatta (9)
1962	St. George (9)	9 – 6	Western Suburbs Magpies (7)	St George (8)	South Sydney Rabbitohs (3)
1963	St. George (10)	8 – 3	Western Suburbs Magpies (8)	St George (9)	Eastern Suburbs (2)
1964	St. George (11)	11 – 6	Balmain Tigers (6)	St George (10)	Canterbury-Bankstown (3)
1965	St. George (12)	12 – 8	South Sydney Rabbitohs (12)	St George (11)	Eastern Suburbs (3)
1966	St. George (13)	23 – 4	Balmain Tigers (7)	St George (12)	Eastern Suburbs (4)
1967	South Sydney Rabbitohs (17)	12 – 10	Canterbury-Bankstown (3)	St George (13)	Cronulla-Sutherland
1968	South Sydney Rabbitohs (18)	13 – 9	Manly-Warringah Sea Eagles (4)	South Sydney Rabbitohs (14)	Newtown (5)
1969	Balmain Tigers (11)	11 – 2	South Sydney Rabbitohs (13)	South Sydney Rabbitohs (15)	Cronulla-Sutherland Sharks (2)
1970	South Sydney Rabbitohs (19)	23 – 12	Manly-Warringah Sea Eagles (5)	South Sydney Rabbitohs (16)	Parramatta (10)
1971	South Sydney Rabbitohs (20)	16 – 10	St. George (7)	Manly-Warringah Sea Eagles	Western Suburbs Magpies (12)
1972	Manly-Warringah Sea Eagles	19 – 14	Eastern Suburbs Roosters (10)	Manly-Warringah Sea Eagles (2)	Parramatta (11)
1973	Manly-Warringah Sea Eagles (2)	10 – 7	Cronulla-Sutherland Sharks	Manly-Warringah Sea Eagles (3)	Penrith Panthers
1974	Eastern Suburbs Roosters (10)	19 – 4	Canterbury-Bankstown (4)	Eastern Suburbs Roosters (12)	Balmain Tigers (2)
1975	Eastern Suburbs Roosters (11)	38 – 0	St. George (8)	Eastern Suburbs Roosters (13)	South Sydney Rabbitohs (4)
1976	Manly-Warringah Sea Eagles (3)	13 – 10	Parramatta	Manly-Warringah Sea Eagles (4)	Newtown Jets (6)
1977	St. George	9 – 9	Parramatta	Parramatta	Newtown Jets (7)
1977	St. George (14)	22 – 0	Parramatta (2)	Parramatta	Newtown Jets (7)
1978	Manly-Warringah Sea Eagles	11 – 11	Cronulla-Sutherland Sharks	Western Suburbs Magpies (5)	Newtown Jets (8)
1978	Manly-Warringah Sea Eagles (4)	16 – 0	Cronulla-Sutherland Sharks (2)	Western Suburbs Magpies (5)	Newtown Jets (8)
1979	St. George Dragons (15)	17 – 13	Canterbury-Bankstown Bulldogs (5)	St George Dragons (14)	North Sydney Bears (9)
1980	Canterbury-Bankstown Bulldogs (3)	18 – 4	Eastern Suburbs Roosters (11)	Eastern Suburbs Roosters (14)	Penrith Panthers (2)
1981	Parramatta Eels	20 – 11	Newtown Jets (7)	Eastern Suburbs Roosters (15)	Balmain Tigers (2)
1982	Parramatta Eels (2)	21 – 8	Manly-Warringah Sea Eagles (6)	Parramatta Eels (2)	Canberra Raiders
1983	Parramatta Eels (3)	18 – 6	Manly-Warringah Sea Eagles (7)	Manly-Warringah Sea Eagles (5)	Western Suburbs Magpies (13)
1984	Canterbury-Bankstown Bulldogs (4)	6 – 4	Parramatta Eels (3)	Canterbury-Bankstown Bulldogs (4)	Western Suburbs Magpies (14)
1985	Canterbury-Bankstown Bulldogs (5)	7 – 6	St. George Dragons (9)	St George Dragons (15)	Illawarra Steelers
1986	Parramatta Eels (4)	4 – 2	Canterbury-Bankstown Bulldogs (6)	Parramatta Eels (3)	Illawarra Steelers (2)
1987	Manly-Warringah Sea Eagles (5)	18 – 8	Canberra Raiders	Manly-Warringah Sea Eagles (6)	Western Suburbs Magpies (15)
1988	Canterbury-Bankstown Bulldogs (6)	24 – 12	Balmain Tigers (8)	Cronulla-Sutherland Sharks	Western Suburbs Magpies (16)
1989	Canberra Raiders	19 – 14	Balmain Tigers (9)	South Sydney Rabbitohs (17)	Illawarra Steelers (3)
1990	Canberra Raiders (2)	18 – 14	Penrith Panthers	Canberra Raiders	South Sydney Rabbitohs (5)
1991	Penrith Panthers	19 – 12	Canberra Raiders (2)	Penrith Panthers	Gold Coast Seagulls
1992	Brisbane Broncos	28 – 8	St. George Dragons (10)	Brisbane Broncos	Gold Coast Seagulls (2)
1993	Brisbane Broncos (2)	14 – 6	St. George Dragons (11)	Canterbury-Bankstown Bulldogs (5)	Gold Coast Seagulls (3)
1994	Canberra Raiders (3)	36 – 12	Canterbury-Bankstown Bulldogs (7)	Canterbury-Bankstown Bulldogs (6)	Balmain Tigers (4)
Australian Rugby League
1995	Sydney Bulldogs (7)	17 – 4	Manly-Warringah Sea Eagles (8)	Manly-Warringah Sea Eagles (7)	North Queensland Cowboys
1996	Manly-Warringah Sea Eagles (6)	20 – 8	St. George Dragons (12)	Manly-Warringah Sea Eagles (8)	South Queensland Crushers
1997	Newcastle Knights	22 – 16	Manly-Warringah Sea Eagles (9)	Manly-Warringah Sea Eagles (9)	South Queensland Crushers (2)
Super League
1997	Brisbane Broncos (3)	26 – 8	Cronulla Sharks (3)	Brisbane Broncos (2)	North Queensland Cowboys (2)
National Rugby League
1998	Brisbane Broncos (4)	38 – 12	Canterbury Bulldogs (8)	Brisbane Broncos (3)	Western Suburbs Magpies (17)
1999	Melbourne Storm	20 – 18	St. George Illawarra Dragons	Sharks (2)	Western Suburbs Magpies (18)
2000	Brisbane Broncos (5)	14 – 6	Sydney Roosters (12)	Brisbane Broncos (4)	North Queensland Cowboys (3)
2001	Newcastle Knights (2)	30 – 24	Parramatta Eels (4)	Parramatta Eels (4)	Penrith Panthers (3)
2002	Sydney Roosters (12)	30 – 8	New Zealand Warriors	New Zealand Warriors	Bulldogs (4)
2003	Penrith Panthers (2)	18 – 6	Sydney Roosters (13)	Penrith Panthers (2)	South Sydney Rabbitohs (6)
2004	Bulldogs (8)	16 – 13	Sydney Roosters (14)	Sydney Roosters (16)	South Sydney Rabbitohs (7)
2005	Wests Tigers	30 – 16	North Queensland Cowboys	Parramatta Eels (5)	Newcastle Knights
2006	Brisbane Broncos (6)	15 – 8	Melbourne Storm	~~Melbourne Storm~~^{1}	South Sydney Rabbitohs (8)
2007	~~Melbourne Storm~~^{1}	34 – 8	Manly-Warringah Sea Eagles (10)	~~Melbourne Storm~~^{1}	Penrith Panthers (4)
2008	Manly-Warringah Sea Eagles (7)	40 – 0	Melbourne Storm (2)	~~Melbourne Storm~~^{1}	Bulldogs (5)
2009	~~Melbourne Storm~~^{1}	23 – 16	Parramatta Eels (5)	St George Illawarra Dragons	Sydney Roosters (5)
2010	St. George Illawarra Dragons	32 – 8	Sydney Roosters (15)	St George Illawarra Dragons (2)	Melbourne Storm^{1}
2011	Manly-Warringah Sea Eagles (8)	24 – 10	New Zealand Warriors (2)	Melbourne Storm	Gold Coast Titans
2012	Melbourne Storm (2)	14 – 4	Canterbury-Bankstown Bulldogs (9)	Canterbury-Bankstown Bulldogs (7)	Parramatta Eels (12)
2013	Sydney Roosters (13)	26 – 18	Manly-Warringah Sea Eagles (11)	Sydney Roosters (17)	Parramatta Eels (13)
2014	South Sydney Rabbitohs (21)	30 – 6	Canterbury-Bankstown Bulldogs (10)	Sydney Roosters (18)	Cronulla-Sutherland Sharks (3)
2015	North Queensland Cowboys	17 – 16	Brisbane Broncos	Sydney Roosters (19)	Newcastle Knights (2)
2016	Cronulla-Sutherland Sharks	14 – 12	Melbourne Storm (3)	Melbourne Storm (2)	Newcastle Knights (3)
2017	Melbourne Storm (3)	34 – 6	North Queensland Cowboys (2)	Melbourne Storm (3)	Newcastle Knights (4)
2018	Sydney Roosters (14)	21 – 6	Melbourne Storm (4)	Sydney Roosters (20)	Parramatta Eels (14)
2019	Sydney Roosters (15)	14 – 8	Canberra Raiders (3)	Melbourne Storm (4)	Gold Coast Titans (2)
2020	Melbourne Storm (4)	26 – 20	Penrith Panthers (2)	Penrith Panthers (3)	Brisbane Broncos
2021	Penrith Panthers (3)	14 – 12	South Sydney Rabbitohs (14)	Melbourne Storm (5)	Canterbury-Bankstown Bulldogs (6)
2022	Penrith Panthers (4)	28 – 12	Parramatta Eels (6)	Penrith Panthers (4)	Wests Tigers
2023	Penrith Panthers (5)	26 – 24	Brisbane Broncos (2)	Penrith Panthers (5)	Wests Tigers (2)
2024	Penrith Panthers (6)	14 – 6	Melbourne Storm (5)	Melbourne Storm (6)	Wests Tigers (3)
2025	Brisbane Broncos (7)	26 – 22	Melbourne Storm (6)	Canberra Raiders (2)	Newcastle Knights (5)
2026	Sydney Roosters (16)	19 – 18	Newcastle Knights	Penrith Panthers (6)	St. George Illawarra Dragons

^{1} The Melbourne Storm were stripped of these titles due to long-term salary cap breaches. They also received 0 points in 2010 due to these breaches.

=== Premiership performances by team ===
Team	Winners	Runners-up	Years won	Years runner-up
South Sydney Rabbitohs	21	14	1908, 1909, 1914, 1918, 1925, 1926, 1927, 1928, 1929, 1931, 1932, 1950, 1951, 1953, 1954, 1955, 1967, 1968, 1970, 1971, 2014	1910, 1916, 1917, 1920, 1923, 1924, 1935, 1937, 1939, 1949, 1952, 1965, 1969, 2021
Sydney Roosters	16	15	1911, 1912, 1913, 1923, 1935, 1936, 1937, 1940, 1945, 1974, 1975, 2002, 2013, 2018, 2019, 2026	1908, 1919, 1921, 1928, 1931, 1934, 1938, 1941, 1960, 1972, 1980, 2000, 2003, 2004, 2010
St George Dragons	15	12	1941, 1949, 1956, 1957, 1958, 1959, 1960, 1961, 1962, 1963, 1964, 1965, 1966, 1977, 1979	1927, 1930, 1933, 1942, 1946, 1953, 1971, 1975, 1985, 1992, 1993, 1996
Balmain Tigers	11	9	1915, 1916, 1917, 1919, 1920, 1924, 1939, 1944, 1946, 1947, 1969	1909, 1936, 1945, 1948, 1956, 1964, 1966, 1988, 1989
Manly-Warringah Sea Eagles	8	11	1972, 1973, 1976, 1978, 1987, 1996, 2008, 2011	1951, 1957, 1959, 1968, 1970, 1982, 1983, 1995, 1997, 2007, 2013
Canterbury-Bankstown Bulldogs	8	10	1938, 1942, 1980, 1984, 1985, 1988, 1995, 2004	1940, 1947, 1967, 1974, 1979, 1986, 1994, 1998, 2012, 2014
Brisbane Broncos	7	2	1992, 1993, 1997, 1998, 2000, 2006, 2025	2015, 2023
Penrith Panthers	6	2	1991, 2003, 2021, 2022, 2023, 2024	1990, 2020
Western Suburbs Magpies	4	8	1930, 1934, 1948, 1952	1918, 1925, 1932, 1950, 1958, 1961, 1962, 1963
Parramatta Eels	4	6	1981, 1982, 1983, 1986	1976, 1977, 1984, 2001, 2009, 2022
Melbourne Storm	4	6	1999, 2012, 2017, 2020	2006, 2008, 2016, 2018, 2024, 2025
Newtown Jets	3	7	1910, 1933, 1943	1913, 1914, 1929, 1944, 1954, 1955, 1981
Canberra Raiders	3	3	1989, 1990, 1994	1987, 1991, 2019
North Sydney Bears/Perth Bears	2	1	1921, 1922	1943
Newcastle Knights	2	1	1997, 2001	2026
Cronulla-Sutherland Sharks	1	3	2016	1973, 1978, 1997
North Queensland Cowboys	1	2	2015	2005, 2017
St George Illawarra Dragons	1	1	2010	1999
Wests Tigers	1	0	2005	–
Glebe Dirty Reds	0	4 (2)	–	1911, 1912, 1915, 1922
New Zealand Warriors	0	2	–	2002, 2011
Sydney University	0	1	–	1926

=== Regular season team performance ===
Team	Minor premiers	Wooden spoon	Years minor premier	Years wooden spoon
Sydney Roosters	20	5	1912, 1913, 1923, 1931, 1934, 1935, 1936, 1937, 1940, 1941, 1945, 1974, 1975, 1980, 1981, 2004, 2013, 2014, 2015, 2018	1949, 1963, 1965, 1966, 2009
South Sydney Rabbitohs	17	8	1908, 1909, 1914, 1918, 1925, 1926, 1927, 1929, 1932, 1949, 1950, 1951, 1953, 1968, 1969, 1970, 1989	1945, 1946, 1962, 1975, 1990, 2003, 2004, 2006
St George Dragons	15	3	1928, 1946, 1956, 1957, 1958, 1959, 1960, 1962, 1963, 1964, 1965, 1966, 1967, 1979, 1985	1922, 1926, 1938
Manly-Warringah Sea Eagles	9	0	1971, 1972, 1973, 1976, 1983, 1987, 1995, 1996, 1997	–
Balmain Tigers	7	4	1915, 1916, 1917, 1919, 1920, 1924, 1939	1911, 1974, 1981, 1994
Canterbury-Bankstown Bulldogs	7	6	1938, 1942, 1947, 1984, 1993, 1994, 2012	1943, 1944, 1964, 2002, 2008, 2021
Melbourne Storm	6	1	~~2006~~, ~~2007~~, ~~2008~~, 2011, 2016, 2017, 2019, 2021, 2024	2010
Penrith Panthers	6	4	1991, 2003, 2020, 2022, 2023, 2026	1973, 1980, 2001, 2007
Newtown Jets	6	8	1910, 1933, 1943, 1944, 1954, 1955	1924, 1925, 1928, 1939, 1968, 1976, 1977, 1978
Parramatta Eels	5	14	1977, 1982, 1986, 2001, 2005	1947, 1952, 1954, 1956, 1957, 1958, 1959, 1960, 1961, 1970, 1972, 2012, 2013, 2018
Western Suburbs Magpies	5	18	1930, 1948, 1952, 1961, 1978	1908,* 1909, 1910, 1912, 1913, 1916, 1933, 1940, 1942, 1953, 1955, 1971, 1983, 1984, 1987, 1988, 1998, 1999
Brisbane Broncos	4	1	1992, 1997, 1998, 2000	2020
Canberra Raiders	2	1	1990, 2025	1982
St George Illawarra Dragons	2	1	2009, 2010	2026
Cronulla-Sutherland Sharks	2	3	1988, 1999	1967, 1969, 2014
North Sydney Bears	2	9	1921, 1922	1915, 1917, 1919, 1932, 1941, 1948, 1950, 1951, 1979
Glebe Dirty Reds	1	0	1911	–
New Zealand Warriors	1	0	2002	–
Cumberland	0	1	–	1908*
South Queensland Crushers	0	2	–	1996, 1997
Gold Coast Titans	0	2	–	2011, 2019
Annandale Dales	0	3	–	1914, 1918, 1920
Illawarra Steelers	0	3	–	1985, 1986, 1989
Gold Coast Chargers	0	3	–	1991, 1992, 1993
North Queensland Cowboys	0	3	–	1995, 1997, 2000
Wests Tigers	0	3	–	2022, 2023, 2024
Newcastle Knights	0	5	–	2005, 2015, 2016, 2017, 2025
Sydney University	0	10	–	1921, 1923, 1927, 1929, 1930, 1931, 1934, 1935, 1936, 1937

== List of QRL/BRL premiers (1909–1994) ==
Season	Premiers	Score	Runners-up	Minor premiers	Wooden spoon
Queensland Rugby League
1909	Fortitude Valley	22–4	South Brisbane	Fortitude Valley	Toombul
1910	Ipswich	17–2	Toombul	Ipswich	South Brisbane
1911	Valleys-Toombul	13–2	Ipswich B	Valleys-Toombul	South Brisbane United
1912	Natives	10–0	South Brisbane	Natives	Woolloongabba
1913	West End	5–3	Natives	West End	Railways
1914	Fortitude Valley	18–8	West End	Fortitude Valley	North Brisbane
1915	Fortitude Valley	10–9	Western Suburbs	Woolloongabba	West End
1916	Western Suburbs	4–2	Fortitude Valley	Western Suburbs	Ipswich Starlights
1917	Fortitude Valley	13–5	Merthyr	Fortitude Valley	Coorparoo
1918	Fortitude Valley	16–12	Merthyr	Merthyr	Western Suburbs (quit competition after 2-point penalty for fielding ineligible players)
1919	Fortitude Valley	28–2	Coorparoo	Fortitude Valley	West End
1920	Western Suburbs	16–8	Christian Brothers	Fortitude Valley	Railways
1921	Carltons	12–10	Coorparoo	Carltons	University
Brisbane Rugby League
1922	Western Suburbs	20–9	Coorparoo	Western Suburbs	Christian Brothers
1923	Coorparoo	13–2	Fortitude Valley	Fortitude Valley	Western Suburbs
1924	Fortitude Valley	11–8	Christian Brothers	Fortitude Valley	University
1925	Carltons	24–5	Coorparoo	Coorparoo	University
1926	Christian Brothers	6–5	Coorparoo	Christian Brothers	Carltons
1927	Past Grammars	13–11	Western Suburbs	Coorparoo	University
1928	University	10–7	Carltons	Carltons	Coorparoo
1929	University	12–11	Coorparoo	University	Western Suburbs
1930	Carltons	19–8	Fortitude Valley	Carltons	University
1931	Fortitude Valley	27–9	Past Grammars	Fortitude Valley	Past Christian Brothers
1932	Western Suburbs	8–7	Past Grammars	Western Suburbs	Wynnum District
1933	Fortitude Valley	9–3	Western Suburbs	Western Suburbs	Southern Suburbs
1934	Northern Suburbs	7–4	Western Suburbs	Western Suburbs	Southern Suburbs
1935	Past Christian Brothers	11–9	Fortitude Valley	Northern Suburbs	Southern Suburbs
1936	Western Suburbs	13–12	Fortitude Valley	Fortitude Valley	Southern Suburbs
1937	Fortitude Valley	9–7	Western Suburbs	Fortitude Valley	Southern Suburbs
1938	Northern Suburbs	16–10	Fortitude Valley	Fortitude Valley	Eastern Suburbs
1939	Past Christian Brothers	11–9	Northern Suburbs	Northern Suburbs	Eastern Suburbs
1940	Northern Suburbs	17–11	Past Christian Brothers	Northern Suburbs	Eastern Suburbs
1941	Fortitude Valley	13–7	Northern Suburbs	Fortitude Valley	Southern Suburbs
1942	Past Brothers	20–11	Southern Suburbs	Fortitude Valley	Western Suburbs
1943	Past Brothers	13–7	Fortitude Valley	Fortitude Valley	Western Suburbs
1944	Fortitude Valley	16–12	Northern Suburbs	Fortitude Valley	Eastern Suburbs
1945	Southern Suburbs	21–11	Northern Suburbs	Northern Suburbs	Eastern Suburbs
1946	Fortitude Valley	5–2	Eastern Suburbs	Eastern Suburbs	Western Suburbs
1947	Eastern Suburbs	15–2	Southern Suburbs	Eastern Suburbs	Western Suburbs
1948	Western Suburbs	14–8	Eastern Suburbs	Western Suburbs	Fortitude Valley
1949	Southern Suburbs	22–8	Eastern Suburbs	Southern Suburbs	Northern Suburbs
1950	Eastern Suburbs	14–10	Western Suburbs	Western Suburbs	Northern Suburbs
1951	Southern Suburbs	20–10	Eastern Suburbs	Southern Suburbs	Fortitude Valley
1952	Western Suburbs	15–14	Past Brothers	Western Suburbs	South Coast
1953	Southern Suburbs	21–4	Eastern Suburbs	Southern Suburbs	Wynnum-Manly
1954	Western Suburbs	35–18	Past Brothers	Southern Suburbs	Northern Suburbs
1955	Fortitude Valley	17–7	Past Brothers	Fortitude Valley	Eastern Suburbs
1956	Past Brothers	17–10	Western Suburbs	Past Brothers	Eastern Suburbs
1957	Fortitude Valley	18–17	Past Brothers	Past Brothers	Wynnum-Manly
1958	Past Brothers	22–7	Fortitude Valley	Western Suburbs	Southern Suburbs
1959	Northern Suburbs	24–18	Past Brothers	Northern Suburbs	Southern Suburbs
1960	Northern Suburbs	18–5	Fortitude Valley	Fortitude Valley	Southern Suburbs
1961	Northern Suburbs	29–5	Fortitude Valley	Northern Suburbs	Eastern Suburbs
1962	Northern Suburbs	22–0	Fortitude Valley	Northern Suburbs	Wynnum-Manly
1963	Northern Suburbs	18–8	Southern Suburbs	Northern Suburbs	Past Brothers
1964	Northern Suburbs	13–4	Past Brothers	Fortitude Valley	Wynnum-Manly
1965	Redcliffe	15–2	Fortitude Valley	Fortitude Valley	Southern Suburbs
1966	Northern Suburbs	9–6	Past Brothers	Northern Suburbs	Wynnum-Manly
1967	Past Brothers	6–2	Northern Suburbs	Fortitude Valley	Wynnum-Manly
1968	Past Brothers	21–4	Eastern Suburbs	Past Brothers	Southern Suburbs
1969	Northern Suburbs	14–2	Fortitude Valley	Northern Suburbs	Southern Suburbs
1970	Fortitude Valley	13–11	Northern Suburbs	Past Brothers	Wynnum-Manly
1971	Fortitude Valley	18–10	Eastern Suburbs	Fortitude Valley	Wynnum-Manly
1972	Eastern Suburbs	16–15	Fortitude Valley	Western Suburbs	Wynnum-Manly
1973	Fortitude Valley	15–7	Redcliffe	Fortitude Valley	Wynnum-Manly
1974	Fortitude Valley	9–2	Past Brothers	Northern Suburbs	Western Suburbs
1975	Western Suburbs	26–24	Redcliffe	Western Suburbs	Fortitude Valley
1976	Western Suburbs	16–1	Eastern Suburbs	Eastern Suburbs	Northern Suburbs
1977	Eastern Suburbs	17–13	Redcliffe	Redcliffe	Southern Suburbs
1978	Eastern Suburbs	14–10	Fortitude Valley	Redcliffe	Northern Suburbs
1979	Fortitude Valley	26–0	Southern Suburbs	Fortitude Valley	Wynnum-Manly
1980	Northern Suburbs	17–15	Southern Suburbs	Fortitude Valley	Western Suburbs
1981	Southern Suburbs	13–9	Redcliffe	Southern Suburbs	Past Brothers
1982	Wynnum-Manly	17–3	Southern Suburbs	Fortitude Valley	Western Suburbs
1983	Eastern Suburbs	14–6	Redcliffe	Redcliffe	Western Suburbs
1984	Wynnum-Manly	42–8	Southern Suburbs	Wynnum-Manly	Northern Suburbs
1985	Southern Suburbs	10–8	Wynnum-Manly	Southern Suburbs	Western Suburbs
1986	Wynnum-Manly	14–6	Past Brothers	Wynnum-Manly	Western Suburbs
1987	Past Brothers	26–8	Redcliffe	Past Brothers	Eastern Suburbs
1988	Seagulls-Diehards	17–14	Ipswich	Southern Suburbs	Logan City
1989	Fortitude Valley	28–4	Ipswich	Fortitude Valley	Logan City
1990	Fortitude Valley	17–16	Northern Suburbs	Fortitude Valley	Wynnum-Manly
1991	Eastern Suburbs	25–10	Western Suburbs	Eastern Suburbs	Wynnum-Manly
1992	Western Suburbs	40–10	Eastern Suburbs	Eastern Suburbs	Ipswich
1993	Western Suburbs	18–12	Eastern Suburbs	Western Suburbs	Logan City
1994	Redcliffe	24–18	Western Suburbs	Redcliffe	Northern Suburbs

Note: The BRL maintained first class status until 1994 when the NSWRL became the ARL and a national competition was formed.

== See also ==
- List of NRL Grand finals
- List of British rugby league champions
