= Fred Fry =

Australian rugby league footballer

Personal information
- Full name: Frederick Fry
- Born: 12 December 1884; Sydney, New South Wales, Australia
- Died: 29 April 1963 (aged 78); Marrickville, New South Wales, Australia

Playing information
- Position: Fullback, Wing, Centre
Club
Years	Team	Pld	T	G	FG	P
1908	Eastern Suburbs	5	0	0	0	0
- Relatives: Ed Fry (brother)

Frederick Fry (1884-1963) was a rugby league footballer in the New South Wales Rugby League (NSWRL) competition in the foundation year of the sport in Australia. Fred Fry was a fullback in the Eastern Suburbs club's first ever match, on Easter Monday, 20 April 1908.

He was the brother of former South Sydney Rabbitohs footballers Ed Fry and William Fry.
