= Peter Moko =

New Zealand Maori rugby league footballer

Personal information
- Born: New Zealand

Playing information
- Position: Centre
Club
| Years | Team | Pld | T | G | FG | P |
|---|---|---|---|---|---|---|
| 1909 | Glebe | 9 | 1 | 1 | 0 | 5 |
Representative
| Years | Team | Pld | T | G | FG | P |
| 1908 | New Zealand Māori |
- Source: RLP

Peter Moko was a New Zealand rugby league footballer who played for New Zealand Māori and Glebe.

== Playing career ==
An outside back/three-quarters, Moko toured Australia in 1908 with the first ever New Zealand Māori side. The side was led by Albert Asher and played an important role in establishing rugby league in both New Zealand and Australia. The team lost to Australia and New South Wales but recorded two wins against Queensland.

Following this, Moko was signed by Glebe and returned to Sydney, competing in the 1909 NSWRFL season. Moko played in nine matches for Glebe, scoring a try and kicking a goal. He is considered to be the first player of Polynesian background to play in the New South Wales Rugby League premiership.

Moko later moved north and played rugby league in Brisbane's new Queensland Rugby Football League competition playing for Toombul also in 1909.
