= Tom Phelan =

Australian rugby league footballer

Personal information
- Full name: Thomas Phelan

Playing information
- Position: Wing, Second-row, Fullback
Club
Years	Team	Pld	T	G	FG	P
1908–09	Western Suburbs	14	1	0	0	3
Representative
Years	Team	Pld	T	G	FG	P
1909	New South Wales	1	0	0	0	0
- Source: As of 26 June 2019

Tom Phelan was an Australian rugby league footballer who played in the 1900s. He played for Western Suburbs in the New South Wales Rugby League (NSWRL) competition. Phelan was a foundation player for Western Suburbs.

== Playing career ==
Phelan made his first grade debut for Western Suburbs against Balmain in Round 1 1908 at Birchgrove Oval which was also the opening week of the New South Wales Rugby League (NSWRL) competition in Australia. Balmain would go on to win the match 24–0.

Phelan played 5 games for Wests in their inaugural season which were all losses. Western Suburbs would go on to finish second last on the table above last placed Cumberland who were dissolved at the conclusion of the season.

The following year, Phelan made 9 appearances for Wests as the club finished last on the table and claimed the wooden spoon. Phelan's final game for Wests was against Newtown in Round 10 1909 at Wentworth Park in which Phelan captained the side.

At representative level, Phelan represented New South Wales on one occasion.
