= Samuel George Ball =

Australian rugby league administrator (1884–1969)

- Born: Samuel George Ball; 8 February 1884; Waterloo, New South Wales, Australia
- Died: 26 August 1969 (aged 85); Double Bay, New South Wales, Australia
- Resting place: South Head Cemetery
- Occupation: Rugby league administrator
- Years active: 1908–1969
- Known for: Co-founder of the South Sydney Rabbitohs; rugby league administrator
- Title: CEO and Chairman of the New South Wales Rugby League (1917–1937)
- Awards: Life Membership of South Sydney Rabbitohs (1961); Life Membership of New South Wales Rugby League

Samuel George Ball (1884–1969) was an Australian rugby league administrator and a co-founder of the South Sydney Rabbitohs.

== Background ==
Ball was born in Waterloo, New South Wales, Australia, on 8 February 1884.

== Career ==
On 25 August 1908, Ball was appointed as a temporary delegate during the absence of other South Sydney delegates whilst on duty with the Kangaroos in England. By 1909 he was appointed as a full-time delegate of the South Sydney Rabbitohs and in 1910 he was appointed vice-president of Souths. By 1911, Ball was appointed the Souths delegate to the New South Wales Rugby League in lieu of Arthur Hennessy and in 1912 he became club-secretary, a position he held for 54 years. By 1913 was appointed to the management committee of Souths (another position he held for 54 years) and also in 1913, he was joint-manager, and later full manager of New South Wales rugby league teams and Australian Kangaroo touring teams to New Zealand, England and France, a position he held for decades. Ball was also CEO and chairman of the New South Wales Rugby League for twenty years between 1917 and 1937.

Ball became the "grand old man" of the South Sydney Rabbitohs who never missed a Souths grand final until the year he died.

== Accolades ==
Ball was awarded Life-Membership of the South Sydney Rabbitohs in 1961, and was also a Life Member of the New South Wales Rugby League.

The S.G. Ball Cup, a rugby league competition for players under the age of 18, was established by the New South Wales Rugby League in 1965, and is named in his honour.

== Death ==
Ball died at his Double Bay home on 26 August 1969, age 85. A large funeral was held for him on 28 August 1969 at St Mark's Church, Darling Point and he was later buried at South Head Cemetery.
