= Frank Storie =

Australian rugby league footballer

Personal information
- Full name: Francis Hugh Storie (Storey)
- Born: 17 October 1883; Lancashire, England, United Kingdom
- Died: 10 May 1960 (aged 76); Hawks Nest, New South Wales, Australia

Playing information
- Position: Wing, Centre
Club
Years	Team	Pld	T	G	FG	P
1908–09	South Sydney	13	8	0	0	24
Representative
Years	Team	Pld	T	G	FG	P
1908–09	New South Wales	2	0	0	0	0
1908	Metropolis	1	0	0	0	0
- Source: As of 26 March 2019

Frank Storie (1883-1960) was an Australian rugby league footballer who played in the 1900s. He played for South Sydney in the New South Wales Rugby League (NSWRL) competition. Storie was a foundation player for South Sydney playing in the club's first ever game.

== Playing career ==
Storie made his first grade debut for Souths against North Sydney at Birchgrove Oval in Round 1 1908 which was the opening week of the NSWRL competition in Australia. Souths won the match 11–7 with Storie playing at centre.

Souths went on to claim the inaugural minor premiership in 1908 and reach the first NSWRL grand final against rivals Eastern Suburbs. Storie played at on the wing as Souths claimed their first premiership winning 14–12 at the Royal Agricultural Society Grounds in front of 4000 spectators.

In 1909, Storie played 5 times for the club as Souths claimed their second premiership in a row against Balmain in controversial circumstances. Balmain were furious that the 1909 NSWRL grand final was to be played as the under card to the Wallabies v Kangaroos match. Balmain attempted to stop the match being played and refused to take the field. Storie and the other South Sydney players attended the ground and then ran on the field, kicked off and scored a try after which they were declared premiers. Storie retired from rugby league after the conclusion of this match.
