= Arthur Butler (rugby league) =

Australia international rugby league footballer

Personal information
- Born: 8 June 1884 Sydney, New South Wales, Australia
- Died: 30 May 1947 (aged 62) Ashbury, New South Wales, Australia

Playing information
- Position: Halfback, Five-eighth
Club
Years	Team	Pld	T	G	FG	P
1908–15	South Sydney	95	20	20	0	100
1916–17	Glebe	21	1	0	0	3
1918–19	Annandale	20	0	0	0	0
	Total	136	21	20	0	103
Representative
Years	Team	Pld	T	G	FG	P
1908–11	New South Wales	7	2	2	0	10
1908–09	Australia	3	1	0	0	3
1911–15	Metropolis	3	0	0	0	0

Arthur Butler (1884–1947) was a pioneer Australian rugby league footballer who played in the 1900s and 1910s. An Australian international and New South Wales interstate representative half, he played club football for the South Sydney, Glebe and Annandale clubs in the NSWRFL Premiership.

== Playing career ==
Butler played for Souths in the first season of rugby league in Australia, the 1908 NSWRFL season. He was also selected to play for New South Wales at halfback in their first ever rugby league game against Queensland, scoring a try in the 43–0 victory, which was the first in a clean sweep of all three of the 1908 interstate series' games.

Butler missed his club Souths' grand final victory as he was selected to go on the first Kangaroo tour, the 1908–09 tour of Great Britain.

In London, Australia faced the English in rugby league football for the first time, and Butler played at halfback, scoring a try in the 22–22 draw.

He is listed on the Australian Players Register as Kangaroo No. 24. Butler also played in the second Test loss, altogether appearing in 23 matches on the tour. The following year Butler again represented Australia when they hosted the New Zealand team. At the end of the 1909 NSWRFL season, he was one of the South Sydney players who showed up on Grand Final day to controversially claim the premiership while Balmain forfeited.

The following year South Sydney again reached the grand final, and Butler played at halfback in the 4–4 draw with Newtown, who had finished the season higher on the ladder so were awarded the 1910 NSWRFL Premiership. He played 14 games in the 1914 season as Souths finished first and claimed the premiership. 1915 was his last season with South Sydney.

Butler then played two seasons with Glebe, then two seasons with Annandale before retiring.

In 1947, Butler died in his Sydney home 9 days short of his 63rd birthday.
