= Arthur Conlin =

Australian rugby league footballer

Arthur Conlon
Personal information
- Born: 11 April 1883 Sydney, New South Wales, Australia
- Died: 31 December 1947 (aged 64) Sydney, New South Wales, Australia

Playing information
- Position: Fullback, Wing, Centre, Five-eighth
Club
Years	Team	Pld	T	G	FG	P
1908–11	South Sydney	30	12	34	0	104
1912	Western Suburbs	8	1	1	0	5
	Total	38	13	35	0	109
Representative
Years	Team	Pld	T	G	FG	P
1909	New South Wales	1	0	0	0	0

Arthur Conlin (1883–1947) was a pioneer Australian rugby league footballer who played in the 1900s and 1910s. A New South Wales and Australian representative goal-kicking back, he played club football for the South Sydney and Western Suburbs clubs.

In rugby league's first season in Australia, the 1908 NSWRFL season, Conlin captained Souths in the inaugural grand final, scoring a try to help his side to premiership victory.

He was the top point-scorer for the 1909 NSWRFL season with 43 points, and that year he represented New South Wales as well. Also in 1909, Conlin's South Sydney side again won the premiership, this time in controversial circumstances as Balmain were ruled to have forfeited it.

During the 1909 representative season he made two appearances at centre for Australia in the 1st and the 3rd Test against the Kiwis in Sydney. He scored a try in that 3rd Test. For over 100 years Conlin's Kangaroo appearances were incorrectly attributed to Albert Conlon a five-eighth with the Glebe Club who toured with the 1908 Kangaroos. Conlon was a playing contemporary of Conlin's but he made no representative appearances in 1909 or thereafter following a family tragedy.

South Sydney reached the final for the 3rd year in a row in the 1910 NSWRFL season and Arthur Conlin played in what would be a try-less draw, the premiership going to opponents Newtown by virtue of their superior ladder position.

By the end of 1910, the NSWRFL's 3rd season Conlin held the record for the most points scored in an NSWRFL career with 101.

After the 1911 NSWRFL season, Conlin moved to Western Suburbs where he played one more season.

Preceded by Horace Miller (1908)	Record-holder; Most points in an NSWRFL career 1910 (57) - 1911 (105)	Succeeded by Dally Messenger (1911)
