= Jack Coxon =

Australian rugby league footballer (1882-1948)

Maxwell Coxon
Personal information
- Full name: Maxwell Wallace Coxon
- Born: 20 December 1882 Bega, New South Wales, Australia
- Died: 18 June 1948 (aged 65) Sydney, New South Wales, Australia

Playing information
- Height: 183 cm (6 ft 0 in)
- Position: Hooker, Prop, Second-row
Club
Years	Team	Pld	T	G	FG	P
1908–11	South Sydney	21	4	0	0	12
Representative
Years	Team	Pld	T	G	FG	P
1909	New South Wales	2	0	0	0	0
1909	Metropolis	1	0	0	0	0
- Source: As of 25 March 2019

Maxwell "Jack" Wallace Coxon (1882−1948) was an Australian rugby league footballer who played in the 1900s and 1910s. He played for South Sydney in the NSWRL competition. Coxon was a foundation player for South Sydney being a part of the club's first ever season.

== Playing career ==
Coxon made his first grade debut for Souths against Cumberland in Round 2 1908 at the Royal Agricultural Society Grounds.

Souths went on to claim the inaugural minor premiership in 1908 and reach the first New South Wales Rugby League (NSWRL) grand final against Eastern Suburbs. Coxon played a hooker as Souths claimed their first premiership winning 14-12 at the Royal Agricultural Society Grounds in front of 4000 spectators.

In 1909, Coxon played 11 times for the club as Souths claimed their second premiership in a row against Balmain in controversial circumstances. Balmain were furious that the 1909 NSWRL grand final was to be played as the under card to the Wallabies v Kangaroos match.

Balmain were seemingly aggrieved at the demotion of importance of the Final, and asked the NSWRL to ensure it was played on a separate day. They also argued that their players labour should not go towards paying money owed to Joynton-Smith and the NSWRL. The League refused and Balmain announced that they would not play.

On the day of the Final the Balmain players arrived outside the ground in the early afternoon, well before the scheduled kick-off time of 2 o’clock. They then picketed the entrance, endeavouring to convince patrons not to enter.

Despite very heavy rain and the protests of the Balmain footballers, enough of a crowd turned up to clear the debts of Joynton-Smith and the NSWRL. Balmain stuck to their word and did not appear on the field. Souths kicked off, picked up the ball and scored a try. The referee awarded them the match, and with it the 1909 premiership.

Coxon retired at the end of the 1911 season. At representative level, Coxon played for Metropolis and New South Wales.
