= Billy Cann =

Australia international rugby league footballer (1882-1958)

Personal information
- Full name: William Askew Cann
- Born: 11 October 1882 Sydney, New South Wales, Australia
- Died: 7 June 1958 (aged 75) Manly, New South Wales, Australia

Playing information
- Position: Lock
Club
Years	Team	Pld	T	G	FG	P
1908–16	South Sydney	72	32	4	0	104
Representative
Years	Team	Pld	T	G	FG	P
1908–12	New South Wales	40	27	14	0	109
1908–14	Australia	9	1	0	0	3
1910	Australasia	1	0	0	0	0

Cann in 1955

Wiliam A. Cann (1882–1958) was an Australian rugby league footballer who played in the 1900s who later wrote for The Sydney Morning Herald. A New South Wales state and Australia national representative lock forward, he has been named as one of the nation's finest footballers of the 20th century. Cann played his club football for South Sydney with whom he won the 1914 NSWRFL Premiership. In 1907 he played for New South Wales in the first rugby match run by the newly created 'New South Wales Rugby Football League' which had just split away from the established New South Wales Rugby Football Union. Cann was also a long-term administrator at Souths and a football journalist.

== Playing career ==
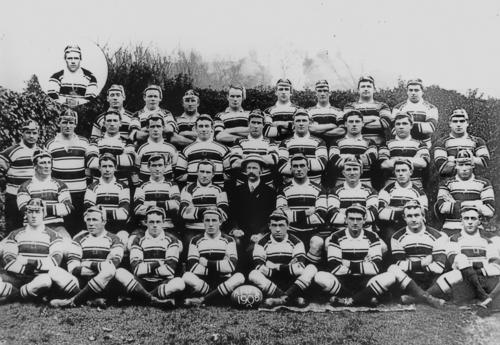
Cann (3rd row, 2nd from left) Pioneer Kangaroos 1908-09

Cann, a contemporary of Dally Messenger and Albert Rosenfeld, began his playing career as a Rugby union three-quarter at Souths. Frustrated at being ignored by rugby union selectors, he joined the rebel New South Wales rugby league team which played the New Zealand All Golds in 1907. Cann joined South Sydney Rabbitohs in 1908. Cann was also selected to play for New South Wales in their first ever rugby league game against Queensland, scoring a try in the 43–0 victory, which was the first in a clean sweep of all three of the 1908 interstate series' games. Butler was then selected to tour England with the Kangaroos in the 1908–09 so was unable to play in Souths' first premiership win in 1908. Cann is listed on the Australian Players Register as Kangaroo No. 20. Cann was a member of the premiership-winning Souths teams of 1909. As Canns family history is now lost forever

Cann also represented Australasia in 1910. Cann was selected to go on the 1911–12 Kangaroo tour of Great Britain as well as two tours to New Zealand with the New South Wales team. Cann was a member of the premiership-winning Souths teams of 1914. He had played 9 seasons with the club.

== Administrative career ==
Cann was a member of Souths' committee from 1908 as well as a delegate to the New South Wales Rugby Football League (NSWRFL). In 1921–1922, Cann was co-manager of the Kangaroo tour along with Souths' secretary, S. G. "George" Ball.

During the 1940s and 1950s, Cann was a vice-president of the NSWRFL. He also wrote for The Sydney Morning Herald.

== Accolades ==
Cann is credited with shaping the role of the lock in the new code. John Quinlan (1911–1912 tour co-manager) said of Cann: "It was he who introduced the typical Australian style of fast forward play in which the backs and forwards combine so effectively and spectacularly. It is no reflection on his successors to say the original model remains the greatest gem."

He was awarded Life Membership of the New South Wales Rugby League in 1914.

In February 2008, Cann was named in the list of Australia's 100 Greatest Players (1908–2007) which was commissioned by the NRL and ARL to celebrate the code's centenary year in Australia. Cann was assigned inductee number 1 in the NRL Hall of Fame.

== Sources ==
- Whiticker, Alan; Hudson, Glen (2007). The Encyclopedia of Rugby League Players. Wetherill Park, New South Wales: Gary Allen Pty Ltd. p. 74. ISBN 978-1-877082-93-1.
- Malcolm Andrews (1992). ABC of Rugby League. Sydney, New South Wales: ABC Enterprises. p. 65. ISBN 0-7333-0176-2.
