= Newcastle Rebels =

Defunct Australian rugby league club, based in Newcastle NSW

Club information
- Full name: Newcastle Rebels
- Founded: 10 April 1908; 117 years ago
- Exited: 1909; 117 years ago

Former details
- Competition: NSWRFL
- 1909: 3rd of 8
- Team colours

Records
- Premierships: 0
- Runners-up: 0
- Minor premierships: 0
- Wooden spoons: 0

Newcastle was a rugby league team who played in the New South Wales Rugby Football League premiership from 1908–1909, one of the nine foundation clubs. After the formation of several clubs in January 1908, members of the NSWRFL came to Newcastle to hold talks with the local footballing community at a meeting on 8 February 1908. However, at this meeting the motion to have a public meeting was lost. The local rugby union fraternity threatened sanctions and further recruitment occurred in secret. Finally, a band of Rebel Pioneers assembled and signed up on 10 April, just days before the start of the competition.

Sometimes called the Rebels, Newcastle played in a strip of red and white hoops. They boasted the likes of dual-code international Pat Walsh in their side. Their moment of glory came in the latter weeks of 1909 when they beat league leaders South Sydney 7–6 on 7 August in front of 3,000 spectators at the Newcastle Showground. It was Souths' only loss for the season. This had come three days after beating a New Zealand Maori team.

Newcastle finished fourth and made the semis but were beaten by Souths 20–0.

The following year, the team left the NSWRL as a local Newcastle Rugby League competition was established and many players joined the four Newcastle foundation clubs. They were replaced by Annandale in the NSWRL.

Since 1988, a new team, the Newcastle Knights has again represented the Newcastle district in the NSWRL and its successors.

On 20 April 2008, the day which marked the centenary of the NSWRL, the Newcastle Knights wore a special replica red and white hooped jersey to celebrate the region's rugby league heritage and the NRL's centenary round.

The modern day Newcastle Rugby League competition operates a representative side named the Newcastle Rebels, in honour of the original team created in 1908. In 2023 and 2024, they claimed the Men's Country Championships.

== 1908 ==
Stan Carpenter was the original captain of the club [Ted McGuinness, Vice Captain] who played their first match against Glebe, losing 8–5. This was then followed by a bye in the second round of the premiership and then securing their first victory in the next round by beating Cumberland 37–0. A win against Western Suburbs was followed by a loss against North Sydney in round five.

Arguably the most significant event of the season for the club was in round six when they were scheduled to play against Newtown in the only match of the weekend. This fact meant that a crowd of 14,000, the second largest in the season, showed up to watch the two teams play at the Royal Agricultural Society Grounds. In this match Newcastle were able to win 17–8.

The club had a tough draw at the end of the season and won just one of their remaining four games. All three of the losses were against the eventual finalists - two against the eventual premiers South Sydney and the other against the runners-up, Eastern Suburbs.

A full list of their inaugural squad can be found at rugbyleagueproject: "Rugbyleagueproject Newcastle Rebels".

Round	Home	Score	Away	Date	Venue	Crowd
1	Glebe	8–5	Newcastle	20 April 1908	Wentworth Park	3,000
2		Bye				
3	Cumberland	0–37	Newcastle	16 May 1908	Wentworth Park	3,000
4	Western Suburbs	2–24	Newcastle	23 May 1908	Agricultural Ground	1,500
5	North Sydney	21–9	Newcastle	30 May 1908	Birchgrove Oval	
6	Newtown	8–17	Newcastle	13 June 1908	Agricultural Ground	14,000
7	South Sydney	30–11	Newcastle	27 June 1908	Agricultural Ground	4,000
8	Balmain	5–28	Newcastle	4 July 1908	Birchgrove Oval	3,000
9	Eastern Suburbs	34–17	Newcastle	25 July 1908	Agricultural Ground	400
10	South Sydney	8–3	Newcastle	8 August 1908	Wentworth Park	

== 1909 ==
Round	Home	Score	Away	Date	Venue	Crowd
1	North Sydney	7–14	Newcastle	24 April 1909	Agricultural Ground	
2	South Sydney	28–9	Newcastle	1 May 1909	Agricultural Ground	400
3	Balmain	9–5	Newcastle	15 May 1909	Birchgrove Oval	
4	Newtown	13–5	Newcastle	22 May 1909	Agricultural Ground	1,500
5	Newcastle	16–18	Eastern Suburbs	29 May 1909	Newcastle Showground	
6	Glebe	8–26	Newcastle	19 June 1909	Agricultural Ground	
7	Newcastle	34–0	Western Suburbs	26 June 1909	Newcastle Showground	
8	Balmain	5–2	Newcastle	10 July 1909	Birchgrove Oval	2,500
9	Western Suburbs	5–28	Newcastle	17 July 1909	Agricultural Ground	
10	Newcastle	5–0	South Sydney	7 August 1909	Newcastle Showground	3,000
SF	South Sydney	20–0	Newcastle	14 August 1909	Agricultural Ground	1,200

== 2023 ==
The modern day Newcastle Rebels competed in the 2023 Men's Country Championships. They won the Championship on 25th March against Riverina Bulls in convincing fashion, 49–16 . Their first match of the tournament was against a Central Coast representative side. Their match day lineup has been named as: 1. Cameron Anderson Central Charlestown Butcher Boys, 2. James Bradley Maitland Pickers, 3. Gary Anderson Maitland Pickers 4. Timanu Alexander Northern Hawks 5. Joe Woodbury Macquarie Scorpions 6. Chad O'Donnell (C) Maitland Pickers, 7. Dylan Phythian Lakes United, 8. Jayden Butterfield Maitland Pickers, 9. Luke Huth Cessnock Goannas, 10. James Taylor Maitland Pickers, 11. Lewis Hamilton South Newcastle Lions, 12. Wyatt Shaw Cessnock Goannas, 13. Ben Stone Western Suburbs Rosellas, 14. Sam Clune Cessnock Goannas 15. Luke Higgins Macquarie Scorpions, 17. Connor Kirkwood Macquarie Scorpions, 18. Lincoln Smith Maitland Pickers, 19. Mitchell Black South Newcastle Lions and 20. Lachlan O'Brien Central Charlestown Butcher Boys. After winning 36–14 , they defeated Illawarra Dragons 30-10 .

Round	Home	Score	Away	Date	Venue	Rebels Statistics
1	Central Coast Rugby League	14–36	Newcastle Rebels	4 March 2023	Morry Breen Oval	Tries: Joe Woodbury (2), James Bradley, Timanu Alexander, Cameron Anderson, Wyatt Shaw, Luke Huth. Conversions: Chad O'Donnell 4/7
2	Illawarra Dragons	10–30	Newcastle Rebels	11 March 2023	Collegians Sports Stadium	Tries: James Bradley (2), Cameron Anderson, Ryan Glanville, Luke Higgins. Conversions: Chad O'Donnell 4/5. Penalty goals: Chad O'Donnell 1/1.
3	Western Rams	18–46	Newcastle Rebels	19 March 2023	Collegians Sports Stadium	Tries: Cameron Anderson, Ryan Glanville(2), Luke Huth, Jack Welsh, Lincoln Smith, Ben Stone. Conversions: Chad O'Donnell 7/7
4	Riverina Bulls	16–49	Newcastle Rebels	25 March 2023	Woy Woy Oval	Tries: James Bradley 2, Gary Alexander 2, Joe Woodbury 2, Jayden Butterfield, Cameron Anderson. Goals: Chad O’Donnell 8, Butterfield field goal

== 2024 ==
The 2024 Rebels squad successfully defended their 2023 crown.

Round	Home	Score	Away	Date	Venue	Rebels Statistics
1	Central Coast Rugby League	14–26	Newcastle Rebels	2 March 2024	Baddeley Park, Cessnock Sports Ground	Tries: Honeti Tuha (2), Cameron Anderson (2), Will Smith. Conversions: Chad O'Donnell 3/5
2	Macarthur Wests Tigers	Macarthur Forfeit	Newcastle Rebels	16 March 2024	Baddeley Park, Cessnock Sports Ground	NA
3	Northern Tigers MCC	0-52	Newcastle Rebels	17 March 2024	Pirtek Park	Tries: Honeti Tuha (3), Cameron Anderson (2), Will Smith, Will Nieuwenhuise, Matt Soper-Lawler. Conversions: Chad O'Donnell 8/9
4	Monaro Colts	4-20	Newcastle Rebels	24 March 2024	Baddeley Park, Cessnock Sports Ground	Tries: Will Nieuwenhuise, Cameron Anderson, Honeti Tuha, James Taylor. Goals: Chad O’Donnell 2/4

== Representatives players ==
=== Australia ===
- Pat Walsh (1908)
- Stan Carpenter (1909)

=== New South Wales ===
- Bill Bailey (1908)
- Pat Walsh (1908)
- Ted McGuinness (1910)
