= Arthur Hennessy =

Australian rugby league player (1876–1959)

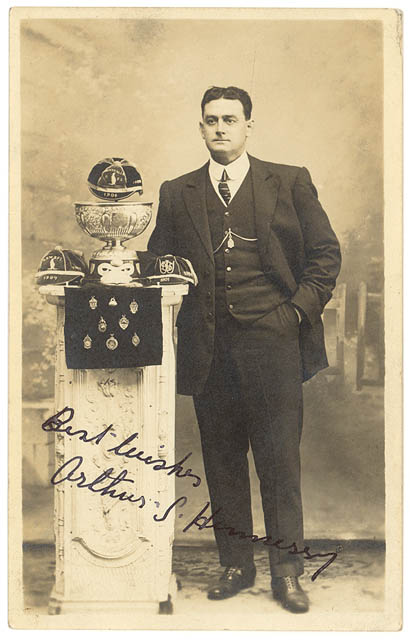

Personal information
- Full name: Arthur Stephen Hennessy
- Born: 24 September 1876 Sydney, Australia
- Died: 19 September 1959 (aged 82) Maroubra, New South Wales, Australia

Playing information
- Height: 5 ft 8 in (173 cm)
- Weight: 12 st 6 lb (79 kg; 174 lb)

Rugby union
- Position: Hooker
Club
Years	Team	Pld	T	G	FG	P
1901–07	South Sydney
Representative
Years	Team	Pld	T	G	FG	P
1901–07	New South Wales

Rugby league
- Position: Hooker
Club
Years	Team	Pld	T	G	FG	P
1908–09	South Sydney	6	2	0	0	6
1909	Easts (Sydney)	4	0	0	0	0
1910–11	South Sydney	20	7	1	0	23
	Total	30	9	1	0	29
Representative
Years	Team	Pld	T	G	FG	P
1907–08	New South Wales	3	0	0	0	0
1908	Australia	2	0	0	0

Coaching information
Club
Years	Team	Gms	W	D	L	W%
1908	South Sydney
1918	South Sydney	14	12	0	2	86
1946	South Sydney	14	0	0	14	0
	Total	28	12	0	16	43
Representative
Years	Team	Gms	W	D	L	W%
1913–13	New South Wales
1929–30	Australia
1930	New Zealand	0	0	0	0

Arthur Stephen "Ash" Hennessy (24 September 1876 – 19 September 1959) was an Australian pioneer rugby league identity. He was a seminal figure in the creation of the South Sydney Rabbitohs for whom he played and later coached. He was a state and national representative hooker/forward and was the first captain of the Australian national rugby league team. He played for New South Wales in the first rugby match run by the newly created 'New South Wales Rugby Football League' which had just split away from the established New South Wales Rugby Football Union. He later coached at club, state and national representative levels.

== Background ==
Born in Sydney, New South Wales, Hennessy played his junior rugby football in the centres for the Boys Brigade in 1895. He then played for Bayview in 1896 and became a South Sydney junior. Hennessy was the grandson of Patrick Hennessy, who was born in Tipperary, Ireland and was transported to Australia as a convict.

== Rugby union career ==
By 1901 Hennessy was a regular first grade rugby union player for Souths. He represented New South Wales in 1901, 1902 and 1904, and he was a rugby union coach at The King's School, Sydney in 1905. A flanker, and later hooker in rugby union (with Souths), when in 1902 Hennessy represented against New Zealand, the All Blacks mistook him for a half-back as he lacked the size they deemed necessary for a forward. His enthusiastic foraging and tackling soon changed Kiwi minds. In 1907 he was made Souths' captain.

== Rugby league career ==
=== Playing ===
When New Zealand toured in 1907, Hennessy joined the breakaway New South Wales Rugby Football League and was selected as the new code's first New South Wales captain. In October of that year Hennessy chaired a meeting of rugby identities with a view to creating a South Sydney rugby league club. The club was formed on 17 January 1908 and Hennessy was the inaugural captain-coach. For rugby league, Hennessy's place in the scheme of things is nothing less than extraordinary. When the new game of Northern Union (rugby league) arrived in Australia in the late winter of 1907, he enthusiastically stepped on board and when the New Zealand All Golds came to play the first of their historic three-game series against New South Wales at the Agricultural Showground in August 1907, he was the captain and coach. The games were played under rugby union rules as no one had a copy of the new code's laws. Hennessy subsequently read the rule book which arrived in Australia and declared: "This is a game for racehorses". Along with his fellow pioneers Hennessy was prepared to accept the ill-will that accompanied the splitting of the rugby code. "You had to take it on the chin and give it on the chin," he said. "Many good friendships tumbled to dust when we switched football codes." Hennessy stands as a monumental figure in the South Sydney story. It was at his home at 9 Chapman St, Surry Hills in October 1907 that the meeting was held which led to the formation of the Rabbitohs. Hennessy has sent a circular to all rugby union clubs in the district, convening the meeting. Because of that day and the events that followed, he can be fairly rated as the club's founder.

In 1908, Hennessy was Souths' first hooker and, with Billy Cann, one of the club's first two delegates to the New South Wales Rugby Football League. He coached Souths in their 1908 NSWRFL season's final. In that foundation season he also had the honour of captaining Australia in its first ever rugby league Test match against New Zealand. Hennessy played in both Tests in May against New Zealand as captain, both of which Australia lost. He is listed in the Australian Players Register as Kangaroo No. 1. In July of that inaugural season he made another representative appearance captaining New South Wales in a 43-0 whitewash of Queensland in the first ever Australian interstate match.

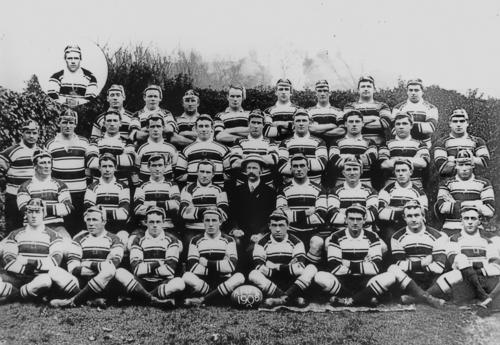
Ash (front, 3rd from right) with Pioneer Kangaroos 1908-09

Hennessy won a place on the inaugural Kangaroo tour of 1908–09, but came under criticism since he also doubled as a selector. He suffered a luckless campaign. Battling with his teammates through the British winter, his jaw was broken and then his cheekbone in minor matches and he played only seven games on tour. In 1909 Hennessy made three appearances for the Eastern Suburbs club, including that year's semi-final against Balmain in which he was named as captain.

Jack Coyne summed him up this way: "His outstanding coaching ability, his leadership on the field and off, his pertinacity and his personality all combined to make Arthur a redoubtable friend and an implacable opponent." Coyne made the point that for a footballer to survive the challenges that emerged in rugby league's early days, he had to be "a big man, in heart, courage and stature".

=== Coaching ===
As coach at South Sydney he was also the father of the Rabbitoh's own style – introducing the "no kick" policy, based on his football creed of Position, Possession, Penetration and Pace. His theory can be summarized as; If you pass the ball often enough and move forward with supports, the defence must eventually crack and you will score tries. Souths lived that creed through much of the club's life – although the arrival of the limited tackle rule in 1967 inevitably changed the way the game was played. He taught rugby (both codes) to a range of teams, at a number of levels: Souths, Saint Ignatius' College, Riverview, Waverley College, The King's School – as well as Country, State and Australia's national representative sides. He also taught boxing, and for a time was manager of the Australian lightweight champion Sid Godfrey.

In 1913 he coached a New South Wales side on a tour of New Zealand and was ahead of his time in introducing a steak-only protein diet on match days. Hennessy was awarded Life Membership of the New South Wales Rugby League in 1914. Hennessy was South Sydney's coach for the 1918 NSWRFL season.

Hennessy joined the 1929–30 Kangaroo tour of Great Britain as coach-masseur of the Australians, who due to Chimpy Busch's controversial 'no-try' at Swinton, were unlucky not to bring home the Ashes.

In 1930 he served as the coach of New Zealand in their tour of Australia.

Hennessy was South Sydney's coach for the 1946 NSWRFL season.

== Later life ==
Living at Maroubra in Sydney's south-eastern beaches Hennessy became something of a local entrepreneur in later life, investing in the Maroubra speedway; opening a mini-golf course and owning the local cinema. He lived there in a cottage opposite the theatre until his death in 1959, 5 days short of his 83rd birthday. He is buried in Botany cemetery.

== Published Sources ==
- Whiticker, Alan (2004) Captaining the Kangaroos, New Holland, Sydney
- Whiticker, Alan & Hudson, Glen (2006) The Encyclopedia of Rugby League Players, Gavin Allen Publishing, Sydney
- Andrews, Malcolm (2006) The ABC of Rugby League Austn Broadcasting Corpn, Sydney
- Apter, Jeff The Coaches : The Men Who Changed Rugby League (2014), The Five Mile Press Scoresby, Victoria

Sporting positions
Preceded by inaugural	Captain Australia; 1908	Succeeded by Denis Lutge
