= Birchgrove Park =

Park and cricket field in Sydney, New South Wales, Australia

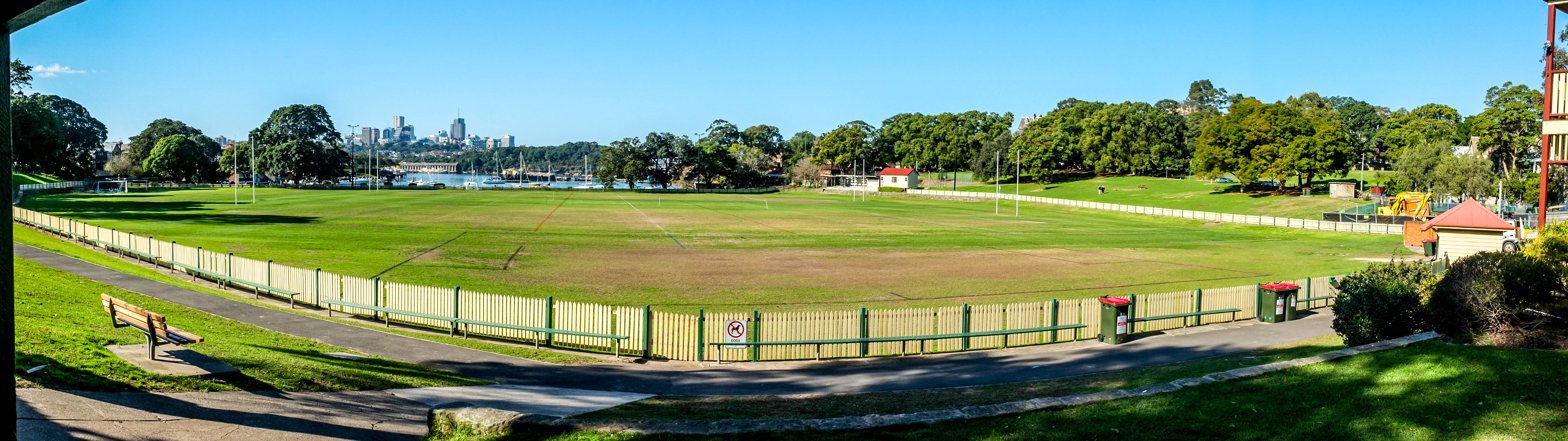
- Birchgrove Park, in 2013
- Interactive map of Birchgrove Park
- Type: Urban park and sports ground
- Location: The Terrace, Birchgrove, Inner West Council, Sydney, New South Wales, Australia
- Coordinates: 33°50′59″S 151°10′54″E
- Created: 1881
- Operator: Inner West Council
- Status: Open all year
- Website: www.innerwest.nsw.gov.au/explore/parks-sport-and-recreation/parks-and-playgrounds/parks-by-suburb/birchgrove-parks/birchgrove-park

Birchgrove Oval
- Interactive map of Birchgrove Oval
- Surface: Grass

Tenants
- Balmain Tigers (NSWRL) (1908-1929, 1931-1932, 1942); Balmain Tigers FC (NSW State League Division 1)

Birchgrove Park is an urban park and sports ground located in Birchgrove, Sydney, New South Wales, Australia, on the waterfront of Sydney Harbour. It is also the location of Birchgrove Oval, the headquarters of the Sydney Cricket Club from 1897 to 1947 and a historic rugby league football ground which served as the original home of the Balmain Tigers club.

== History ==
The park was established in 1881 through subdivision of the estate of Lieutenant John Birch, acquired by Didier Numa Joubert. Sale of Joubert's allotments fell well short of expectations, and the Bank of New South Wales foreclosed. The NSW Government acquired thirty six allotments that led to the formation of the Birchgrove Recreation Ground; and the creation of the subsequent Birchgrove Park Trust.

Regarded as the spiritual birthplace of rugby league in Australia because it hosted the first professional matches in 1908, Birchgrove Oval hosted the official launch of the 2008 NRL season, which celebrated the sport's centenary in Australia. Australian rules football also has historical links to Birchgrove Park, with NSWFA matches played there from 1903 to 1926.

During the 1908 New Zealand Māori rugby league tour of Australia, a Sydney Metropolitan team hosted a match against the tourists at Birchgrove Park.

== See also ==
- List of parks in Sydney
