= Taylor–Heaslop Building =

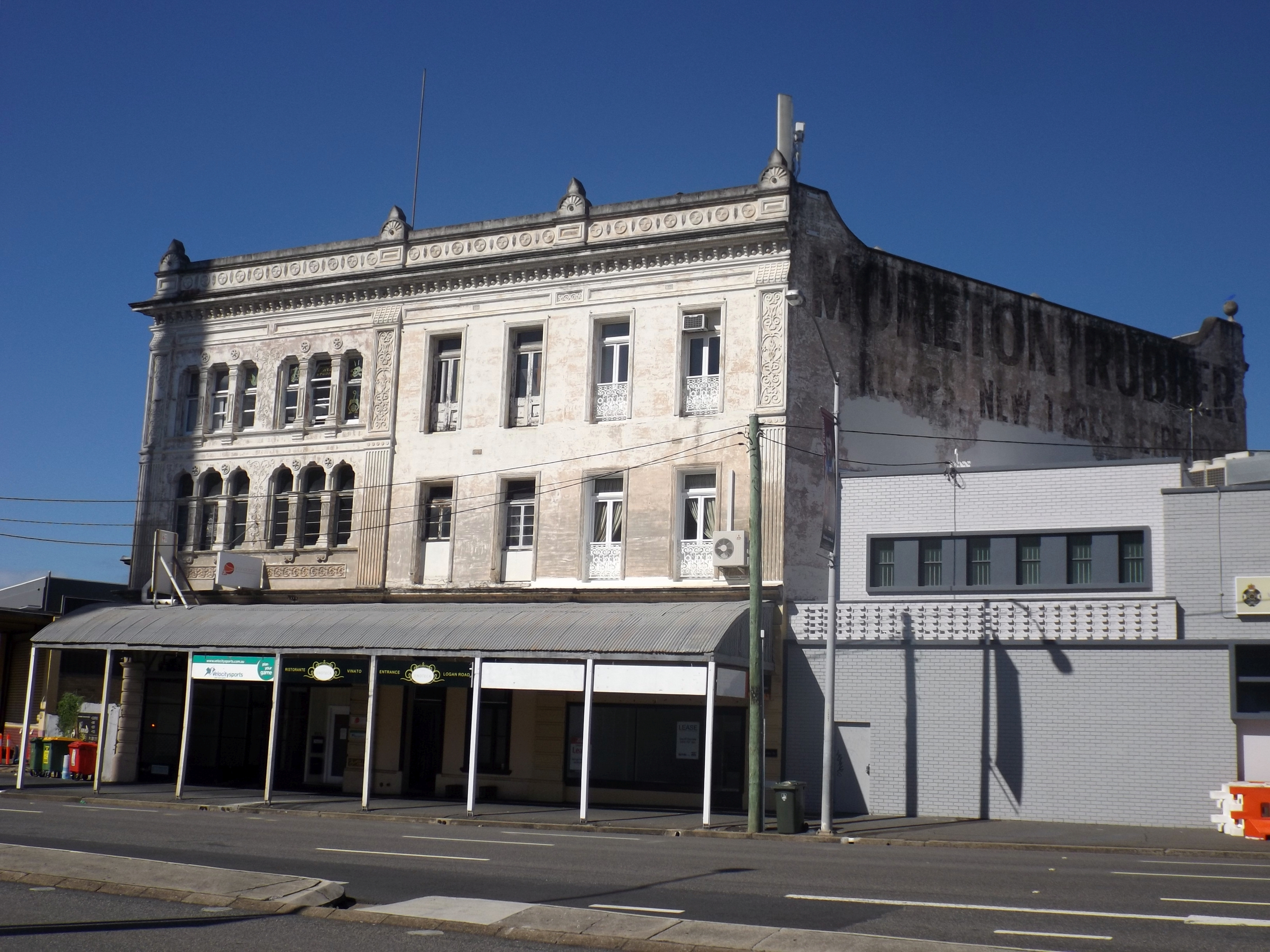
- View from Stanley Street East, 2015

- Location within Queensland Location within Australia
- 27.4869°S 153.0367°E
- Location: 10–14 Logan Road, Woolloongabba, City of Brisbane, Queensland, Australia

History
- Design period: 1870s–1890s (late 19th century)
- Built: 1889–1890

Site notes
- Architect: John B Nicholson
- Architectural style: Classicism

Queensland Heritage Register
- Official name: Taylor–Heaslop Building (former), Ernest Reid, Draper, John Evans' Cash Draper; George Logan Draper; Johns & Co Draper, People's Cash Store; grocers; JR Blane, grocer & hardware merchant; Moreton Rubber Works
- Type: state heritage (built)
- Designated: 6 February 2006
- Reference no.: 602190
- Significant period: 1880s, 1890s (fabric); 1890–ongoing (historical commercial use)
- Significant components: fireplace, basement / sub-floor, lead light/s

Taylor–Heaslop Building is a heritage-listed commercial building at 10–14 Logan Road, Woolloongabba, City of Brisbane, Queensland, Australia. It was designed by John Beauchamp Nicholson and built from 1889 to 1890. It is also known as Ernest Reid (draper), John Evan's Cash Draper, George Logan Draper, Johns & Co Draper, People's Cash Store (grocers), JR Blane (grocer & hardware merchant), and Moreton Rubber Works. It was added to the Queensland Heritage Register on 6 February 2006.

== History ==
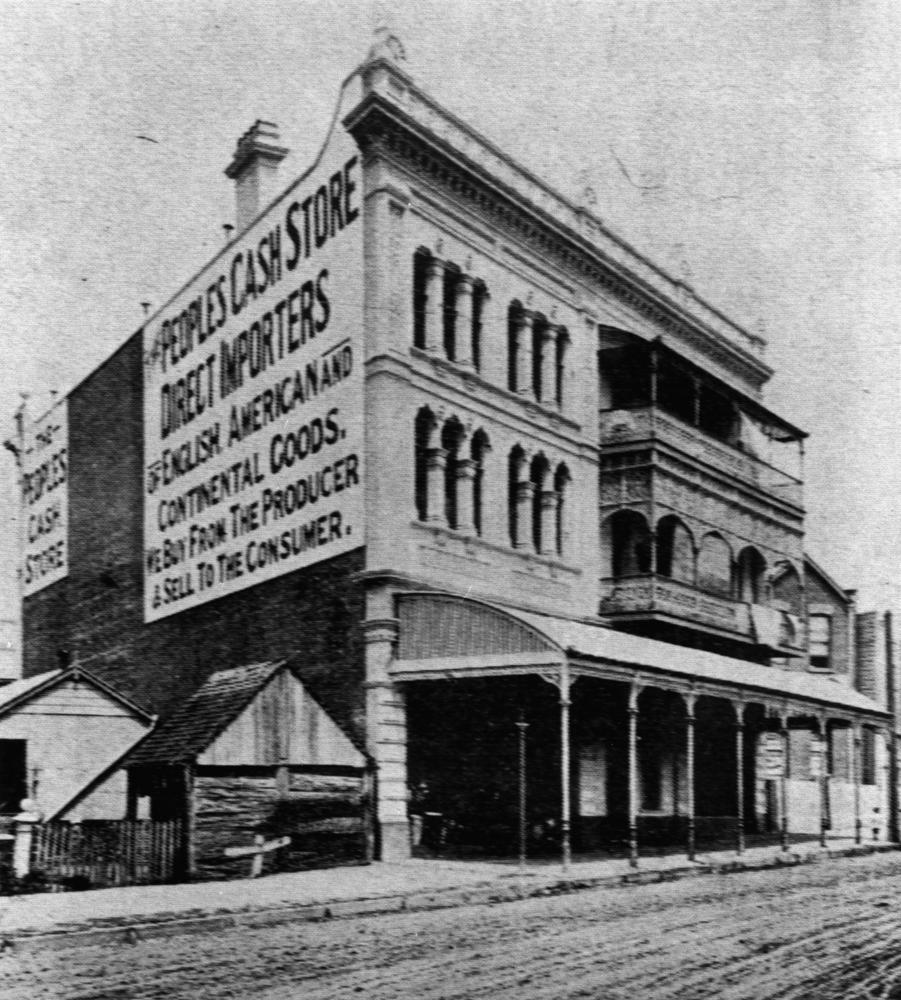
People's Cash Store, Woolloongabba, 1900

A substantial brick commercial premises of three storeys and basement, the former Taylor–Heaslop Building was erected in 1889–90 as a set of three attached shops. The northwest and middle shops were built for Brisbane chemist Walter Taylor, as an investment. The southeast shop, which is larger than the other two, was built for South Brisbane grocers James and Thomas Heaslop and was a branch of their highly successful People's Cash Store. The three shops were designed by Brisbane architect John Beauchamp Nicholson and were erected as one building, with the street facades of Heaslop's shop distinguished from those of Taylor's two shops.

The land on which the building is located was originally part of a suburban block of just over 16 acres, located at the intersection of the roads to the Logan and to Ipswich (later known as the Woolloongabba Fiveways). This parcel (suburban portion 165, parish of South Brisbane) was alienated by James Gibbon in 1857, and was subdivided into commercial and residential allotments by the late 1870s.

In the 1880s Woolloongabba boomed as both a working class residential district and as a commercial centre, due principally to construction of the rail link from the Ipswich line at Corinda (South Brisbane Junction) to South Brisbane, which opened in June 1884. The main purpose of this line was to bring coal from West Moreton to the ships at South Brisbane, terminating, via a tunnel at Lower River Terrace, in Stanley Street, near the South Brisbane Dry Dock. However, the main goods yard and passenger terminus was at the western end of the former water reserve at One Mile Swamp, near Main Street between Stanley Street East and Vulture Street (now the site of the Woolloongabba busway station). The railway looped across Logan Road through suburban portion 165 to reach the goods yards and passenger station.

In addition, from 1887 a horse-drawn tram service linked South Brisbane to Mount Gravatt via Logan Road and the Woolloongabba Fiveways, and from 1 November 1889 the newly opened Cleveland Railway terminated at Woolloongabba. From here passengers continuing on to North and South Brisbane transferred to horse trams. These improvements to passenger and goods transportation stimulated commercial development at the Woolloongabba Fiveways. In January 1886, title to a small, triangular parcel of land between Logan Road and Stanley Street East, at the Fiveways Corner (subs 1 & 2 of section 1 of suburban portion 165, containing 30 perches) was transferred to South Brisbane chemist and dentist Thomas Watson Thomason. Within a few months, Thomason had subdivided this land into eight smaller commercial re-subdivisions, each with a frontage to both Logan Road and Stanley Street East. At the Fiveways Corner, Thomason established The Five Ways Pharmacy in a two-storeyed timber building. The other seven re-subdivisions were sold by the end of 1886.

In August 1886, Henry Willoughby acquired title to re-subdivision 8 (9.3 perches), and in December 1886 Catherine Taylor, wife of Walter Taylor of Brisbane (likely the Queen-street wholesale chemist, dentist and property investor), acquired title to re-subdivisions 6 & 7 (8.7 perches). In December 1887, title to Willoughby's allotment was transferred to South Brisbane grocer Thomas Heaslop, and in May–June 1889 Brisbane architect John Beauchamp Nicholson called tenders for the construction of substantial brick buildings at the Woolloongabba Fiveways, for Walter Taylor and J & T Heaslop. This appears to refer to the large, three-storeyed brick building at 10–14 Logan Road, Woolloongabba which, when completed, dominated the Fiveways Junction.

Early photographs reveal that at street level on both street facades, the three shops shared a common convex iron awning supported on posts with decorative cast iron bracketing. The middle and northwest shops had cantilevered verandahs on the upper floors, onto which French doors opened. The verandahs had elaborately decorative cast iron balustrading, valances and brackets. By 1955 these verandahs were removed. Designed without verandahs, the facade of the southeast shop was distinguished by arched windows and greater use of render ornament.

Nicholson developed a successful architectural practice in Brisbane in the 1880s. His notable commissions include: the Princess Theatre (1888–89) at nearby Clarence Corner; the Norman Hotel (1889) on Ipswich Road, Woolloongabba and the Shaftson Hotel (1889–90) at East Brisbane (both hotels possibly erected for members of the Heaslop family); and, in partnership with architect ARL Wright: the Normanby Hotel (1889–90) at Red Hill; Parbury, Lamb & Co.'s Warehouse in Eagle Street (1890) (demolished); Lady Musgrave Lodge, Astor Terrace, Spring Hill (1891–92) (demolished); and Chardon's Hotel, Ipswich Road, Annerley (1891–92) (demolished). Nicholson had designed J & T Heaslop's shop and store in Stanley Street, South Brisbane, erected 1885–87, and later their shop in Brunswick Street, Fortitude Valley, erected in 1891. Despite his varied architectural commissions and development interests, Nicholson was declared insolvent in 1891 as a result of the prevailing economic depression.

The Taylor–Heaslop building at the Woolloongabba Fiveways was under construction by August–September 1889, when Catherine Taylor and Thomas Heaslop registered easements and encumbrances over a party wall now erected on their Woolloongabba property. At this time, part of Heaslop's allotment was effectively made the property of Catherine Taylor, to accommodate the whole of the middle shop. The building was likely completed in 1890.

The timing was unfortunate. In 1890 the economic boom of the 1880s burst and Queensland, along with the rest of the world, entered a period of widespread economic depression. In addition, the extension of the railway to Melbourne Street, which opened on 1 December 1891, by-passed Woolloongabba station, diverting passenger traffic on the South Coast, Cleveland and South Brisbane Junction lines to South Brisbane. The Woolloongabba passenger station closed, but the railyard remained the south side's principal goods yard and locomotive depot until the line was closed in 1969.

J & T Heaslop's People's Cash Store had opened in the southeast shop (14 Logan Road) by 1891, but the Taylor's two shops, at 10–12 Logan Road, may have been unoccupied until at least one was tenanted by SH Rawlings, boot importer, from c. 1892. In October 1893, Catherine Taylor transferred her interest in the two northern shops to James Heaslop, who maintained these as rental propositions. By the late 1890s, Albert M Goodall appears to have taken over Rawlings boot importing business in the building.

Brisbane in the 1890s supported four principal shopping centres: North Brisbane (along Queen, George, and Adelaide Streets); Fortitude Valley (along Brunswick, Ann Street and Wickham Streets); Stanley Street, South Brisbane; and the Woolloongabba Fiveways. Branches of J & T Heaslop's People's Cash Store were opened in each of these centres, and their building at 10–14 Logan Road, Woolloongabba, dominated the Fiveways commercial district.

Irish brothers James and Thomas Heaslop had arrived in Queensland in 1863 with their parents, Samuel and Mary Heaslop, and brothers Samuel, Robert, John, George and William. In 1865, James and Thomas established a small retail grocery business at One-Mile Swamp (near Clarence Corner, South Brisbane) and by 1900 had created a chain of "direct importing" stores known as the People's Cash Store. The principal wholesale and retail stores were at Stanley Street, Clarence Corner, and branch stores had been established at the Woolloongabba Fiveways; Melbourne Street, South Brisbane (at the southern end of Victoria Bridge); Brunswick Street, Fortitude Valley; Rockhampton; and Charters Towers.

The Heaslops were well known and respected in Brisbane business circles, and were staunch supporters of the Catholic Church. Thomas Heaslop served on the South Brisbane Municipal Council 1888–1895, from the inception of the Borough of South Brisbane, and was Mayor of South Brisbane for three terms, 1891–1893. He was involved with the commissioning of the South Brisbane Municipal Chambers, paid the workmen on the site nearly £500 out of his own pocket when the contractor, Abraham James, absconded in 1891, and officiated at its formal opening on 1 July 1892. His term as mayor also encompassed the great floods of 1893, which decimated large sections of South Brisbane, West End and Woolloongabba.

In 1901 James and Thomas dissolved their partnership. At this time, title to 14 Logan Road (the southeast shop) was transferred from Thomas Heaslop to James Heaslop, giving the latter ownership of the three shops at 10–14 Logan Road. James leased 14 Logan Road to Thomas Heaslop (Thomas Heaslop & Co. Limited by 1911). Thomas died in 1911, but his Company continued to operate a branch of the People's Cash Store from James Heaslop's Woolloongabba Fiveways building until the early 1920s.

From 1 May 1902, Fiveways draper John Edwin Sheppard Evans took up the lease of the middle shop (12 Logan Road) from James Heaslop, and from the 1 February 1903 he also took up the lease of the northwest shop (10 Logan Road). Evans was no stranger to the locality. In February 1888 he had established a drapery business next door at 8 Logan Road, in premises owned by AR McLeod. By 1900 he was occupying 6–8 Logan Road, and in 1902–03 expanded into Heaslop's building. Together, John Evans Cash Draper and Heaslop's People's Cash Store dominated the shopping centre at the Woolloongabba Fiveways in the early 1900s.

Evans died in 1907, and for some years the business was conducted by his widow, Margaret Anne Higgins Evans, until she sold to George Logan in 1910. As George Logan, Draper, the business was sustained into the early 1920s.

James Heaslop died in 1922, following which his estate passed to his widow, Clara Ellen Heaslop, who from February 1923 leased 14 Logan Road to grocer and hardware merchant John Robertson Blane. Also in 1923, George Logan apparently sold his drapery business to William Johns, who took a lease of 10–12 Logan Road from Mrs Heaslop in March 1923.

In the 1920s, Woolloongabba flourished as a shopping centre, servicing the rapidly expanding eastern and southern suburbs of Balmoral, Hawthorne, East Brisbane, Coorparoo, Stone's Corner, Greenslopes, Holland Park and Annerley, all of which had electric tram access to North and South Brisbane via the Woolloongabba Fiveways. Many of the earlier shops around the Fiveways were re-developed at this period, including the block opposite Mrs Heaslop's building in Logan Road, but her building continued to dominate, in scale and landmark value, the Fiveways Junction. It appears that the street level shop facades of Mrs Heaslop's building were remodelled at this period.

In terms of height and street presence, the only building to rival Mrs Heaslop's building at the Woolloongabba Fiveways was the Broadway Theatre, a three-storey high brick picture theatre fronting Ipswich Road, just past the intersection with Logan Road, erected in 1923 but destroyed by fire in June 1962. JR Blane, grocer & hardware merchant, occupied 14 Logan Road until c. 1928, and Johns & Co., Drapers, occupied 10–12 Logan Road until c. 1930. Ernest Reid acquired John's drapery business about this time, and also expanded into 14 Logan Road (the southeast shop, formerly Blane's), occupying all three of Mrs Heaslop's shops until c. 1932. In the midst of the depression of the early 1930s, Mrs Heaslop found it difficult to attract tenants for the Woolloongabba premises following Reid's departure. The shops remained vacant until c. 1936, when the Moreton Rubber Works, motor tyre retailers who had premises further south along Logan Road, occupied 14 Logan Road as their offices. In the late 1930s, 10–12 Logan Road was occupied by estate agents Five Ways Real Estate & Auctioneers. Mrs Heaslop died in 1944, and the building passed out of her estate in 1950, when 14 Logan Road was acquired by Frederick Pratt and 10–12 Logan Road was transferred to Mrs Ruby Richards, then to Andrew Lowreys in 1951. In 1953, Pratt also acquired title to 10–12 Logan Road, and the property remained in his estate until 1989.

From the 1950s, the expansion of outer suburban shopping centres had a negative impact on older, inner city shopping districts such as the Woolloongabba Fiveways. The closure of the Woolloongabba Railyards and the cessation of Brisbane's tram services in 1969, and the construction of the Southeast Freeway through Woolloongabba in the early 1970s – which effectively cut the suburb's commercial heart in half – further contributed to the decline of Woolloongabba as a shopping centre. The northern end of Logan Road, where the former Taylor–Heaslop Building is located, is no longer directly accessible from the Fiveways Junction. However, in the last two decades of the 20th century, this section of Logan Road, which is now virtually a cul-de-sac, was rejuvenated as an antiques, secondhand goods, and gallery precinct. The ground floor of the shop at 10–12 Logan Road, for example, was occupied by a furniture restoration business.

In December 2014, the ground floors of Nos. 10 & 12 were occupied by the Enoteca Wine Store and Restaurant, while No. 14 is occupied by the Bird Cage Pan Asian Restaurant.

== Description ==
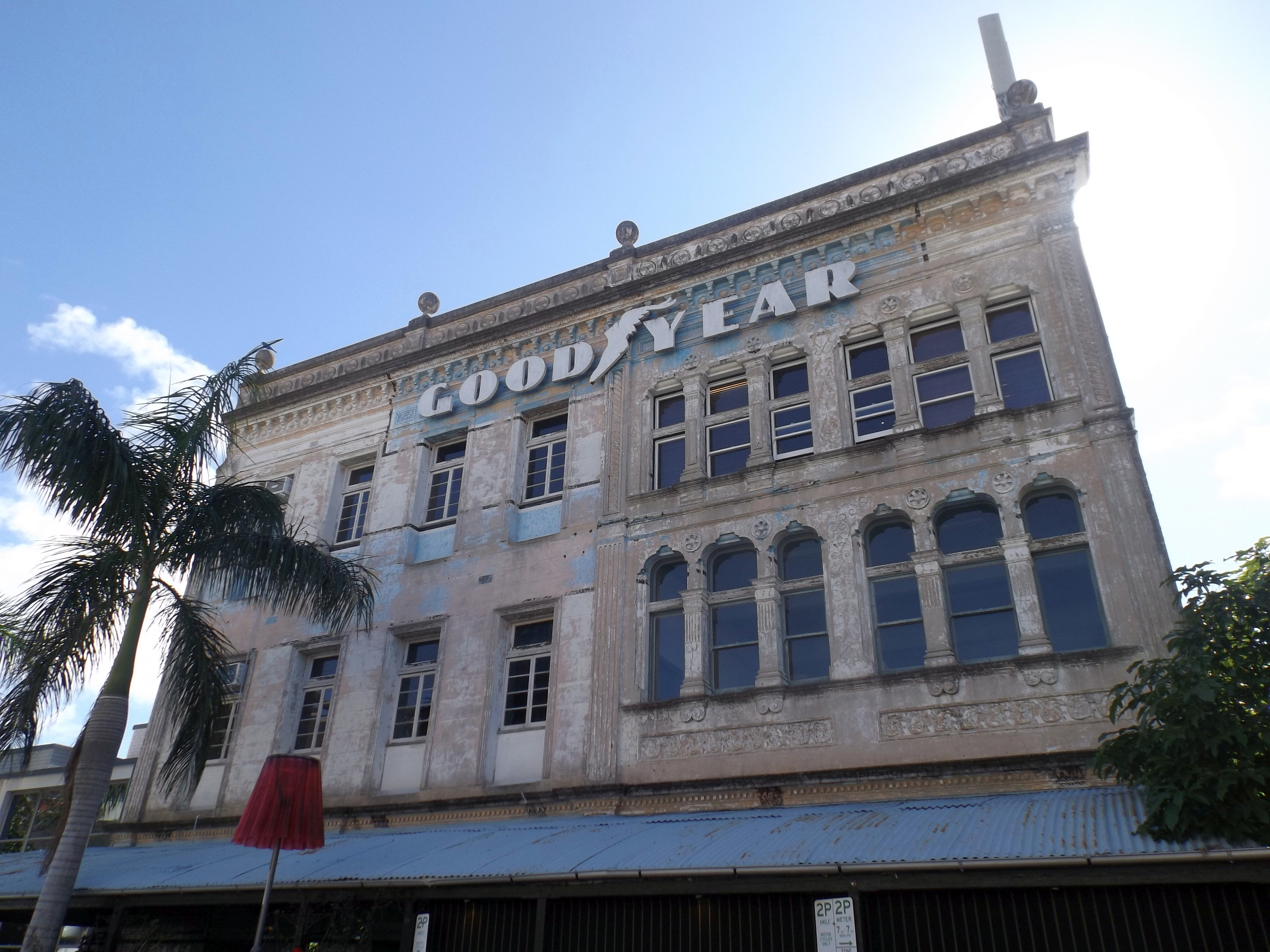
View from Logan Road, 2015

The former Taylor–Heaslop Building is an imposing three-storey masonry building located in the commercial precinct known as the Woolloongabba Fiveways. Centred around the intersection of Stanley Street East, Main Street and the northern end of Logan Road, the Fiveways is now divided by heavily trafficked roads and freeways. The Taylor–Heaslop Building is set in the most intact part of the Fiveways precinct at the northern end of Logan Road. Now blocked off from Stanley and Main Streets, this part of Logan Road retains many 19th and early 20th century buildings.

Situated in the middle of a truncated block formed by the convergence of Logan Road and Stanley Street East, the former Taylor–Heaslop Building is built to the property alignments and fully occupies several parcels of land. It is the tallest building in the predominantly two-storey streetscape and consists of a basement, shops at street level and two upper storeys, now mostly used as offices. The former Taylor–Heaslop Building has two street facades, the southwest facade facing Logan Road and the northern facade facing Stanley Street East. Hidden from view behind parapets is a corrugated metal roof that has three ridges running the length of each shop. Metal ventilators and brick chimneys are visible above the parapet. Original light wells have been covered up with either transparent or metal roof sheeting.

A row or terrace type structure originally built as three shops, the Taylor–Heaslop building consists of three long narrow adjoining buildings on separate titles; 10, 12 and 14 Logan Road. 14 Logan Road is bigger than the other two shops, having a wider frontage and a greater depth of plan due to the truncated shape of the site. The facades of 14 Logan Road are distinguished from the facades of 10–12 Logan Road by the use of a different fenestration pattern and a more ornate style.

The masonry street facades are finished with render and paint and decorated with a variety of ornament in a predominantly classical style. At the street level glazed shopfronts are covered by footpath awnings. Pilasters with fluting on the first level and twisted rope detail or scrollwork on the second level mark the corners of the building and the junctions between 10 to 12 and 14 Logan Road.

The curved corrugated iron awnings over the footpath and the parapet with frieze and cornice supported on modillions are continuous elements across the street facades. Mounted on top of the parapet are masonry balls on the Logan Road facade and a fan type ornament on the Stanley Street facade. These parapet ornaments mark the position of the party walls that separate the three tenancies. Two of the original cast iron columns supporting the footpath awning remain on Logan Road. The remainder of the posts have been replaced with timber. The Stanley Street East awning has been recently rebuilt in timber.

The facades of 10–12 Logan Road are restrained with openings defined by simple architraves. The original cantilevered verandahs on the two upper levels have been removed and some of the French doors replaced with casement windows. Six pairs of the original doors remain on the Stanley Street facade but all have been replaced on the Logan Road facade. The original transom lights and cast iron vents remain.

The facade of 14 Logan Road, designed without a verandah, is in a more ornate eclectic style with swirling plant motifs in panels breaking up the expanse of wall. Windows are double hung sashes separated by square columns with bulging capitals. The windows on the first floor have stylized ogee-arched tops.

The sidewalls are predominantly painted brick and abut the walls of the neighbouring buildings, a two-storey former bank built in the mid twentieth century to the northwest and a modest single storey commercial building and timber sheds on the southeast. The northwest sidewall is notable for a painted Moreton Rubber sign, a local landmark.

Most of the shopfronts have been rebuilt over time. On Logan Road the street level shop fronts retain their c. 1920s remodeling, with leadlights above plate glass display windows and recessed doorways. On Stanley Street the two shops on the perimeter of the building have glazed shop windows while the middle shop retains the original wall, entry door and window.

Similar materials and finishes can be found throughout the Taylor–Heaslop Building. Party walls are mostly rendered brickwork, original internal walls and ceilings are lathe and plaster, and floors are concrete or timber on the upper levels. However interiors in each of the three buildings vary considerably. 10 and 12 Logan Road are similar in design but 12 Logan Road is in an advanced state of disrepair while 10 Logan Road has been renovated. The larger spaces of 14 Logan Road have been renovated and new office partitions inserted.

The basic layout of each building is similar. The main shopfronts face Logan Road while entries to the upper floor offices and other shop windows face Stanley Street. Hallways or vestibules from Stanley Street lead to a timber staircase, located along the northwest party wall halfway between the two street frontages. A light well is located adjacent to the stair in 10 and 12 Logan Road. The stairs to the upper levels of 10 and 12 Logan Road retain or have had reinstated the original turned timber balustrade. The flight of stairs between the ground floor and the first floor of 12 Logan Road has been removed. The stair in 14 Logan Road has been largely rebuilt. Doors located in the masonry party walls connect the adjoining buildings.

The only basement inspected was 10 Logan Road, a large space with a concrete floor, painted brick walls and the remnants of two brick fireplaces. A smaller space opens off the main space and some toilets, accessed from this smaller space, are built under the footpath. The basement has no ceilings and the timber framing of the floor above is clearly visible.

At the ground floor level, a portion of the party wall between 10 and 12 Logan Road has been removed, to form a single shop on the Logan Road frontage. The glazed entry vestibule and display window which fronts Stanley Street is built at a lower level to the main floor and has very tall ceilings. External masonry walls and timber windows open into this space suggesting it may once have been more open. The upper levels consist of two floors of office space, divided into smaller rooms arranged around the central stair and light well. These levels have been renovated retaining original rooms, timber flooring and internal door and window joinery. The first floor has marble fireplaces.

The upper levels of 12 Logan Road retain original lathe and plaster walls, ceiling roses, timber stairs and fireplaces with timber mantelpieces. Much of the internal fabric in this part of the building is decayed and plasterwork has fallen off walls and ceilings. The first floor is a single open space with metal storage racks suspended from the framing of the floor above. The second floor is similar in layout to the office levels of 10 Logan Road.

Shops occupy the ground floor of 14 Logan Road. The first floor is divided into tenancies by recently constructed timber and glass partitions. Exposed steel beams supported on concrete blocks set into the walls hold up the floor above. Casement windows have been added to the eastern sidewall. The second floor is a single open space with new glass and timber partitions built around the stair. The ceiling is lined with timber boards at the southern end and flat sheeting at the northern end. A large skylight sheeted in green fibreglass illuminates the northwest end of the space.

Because of its height and double street frontage the building is visible from the surrounding area and contributes to its historic character. Although the scale and urban fabric of the Wooloongabba Fiveways has altered dramatically over time, it retains a significant group of historic buildings many of which can be seen from and form the setting for the Taylor–Heaslop Building.

== Heritage listing ==
Taylor–Heaslop Building (former) was listed on the Queensland Heritage Register on 6 February 2006 having satisfied the following criteria.

The place is important in demonstrating the evolution or pattern of Queensland's history.

The former Taylor–Heaslop Building, erected in 1889–90, is important as surviving evidence of the Woolloongabba Fiveways, one of Brisbane's principal shopping centres in the latter part of the 19th century, and for demonstrating the impact of the economic boom of the 1880s on metropolitan Brisbane. Heaslop's People's Cash Store at 14 Logan Road, and a sequence of drapery establishments (principally John Evans', George Logan, John's & Co. and Ernest Reid) at 10–12 Logan Road, were amongst Woolloongabba's leading retailers prior to the 1930s depression.

The place demonstrates rare, uncommon or endangered aspects of Queensland's cultural heritage.

While a number of similar buildings of this era were erected at South Brisbane, Fortitude Valley and in the Brisbane central business district, comparatively few have survived as intact as this building.

The place is important in demonstrating the principal characteristics of a particular class of cultural places.

The place is important in illustrating the principal characteristics of a boom-era commercial premises. A four-storey masonry building with decorative street facades, glazed shop fronts at ground level and footpath awnings, it is a row or terrace type structure that was originally divided into three shops. The building is unusual in that each shop has two street frontages, and the southeast shop, although constructed at the same time as the rest of the building has more ornamental facades. A fine example of the commercial work of Brisbane architect John Beauchamp Nicholson, the place is important in contributing to our understanding of his work.

The place is important because of its aesthetic significance.

The former Taylor–Heaslop Building, a landmark in Woolloongabba since 1889, has aesthetic value due to its prominent location, imposing size and idiosyncratic design. It is an integral part of the townscape of a distinctive locality and remains a key element in establishing the character of the Fiveways Junction, especially the northern end of Logan Road.
