= Lion Brewery, Townsville =

Brewery in Townsville, Queensland

Lion Brewery
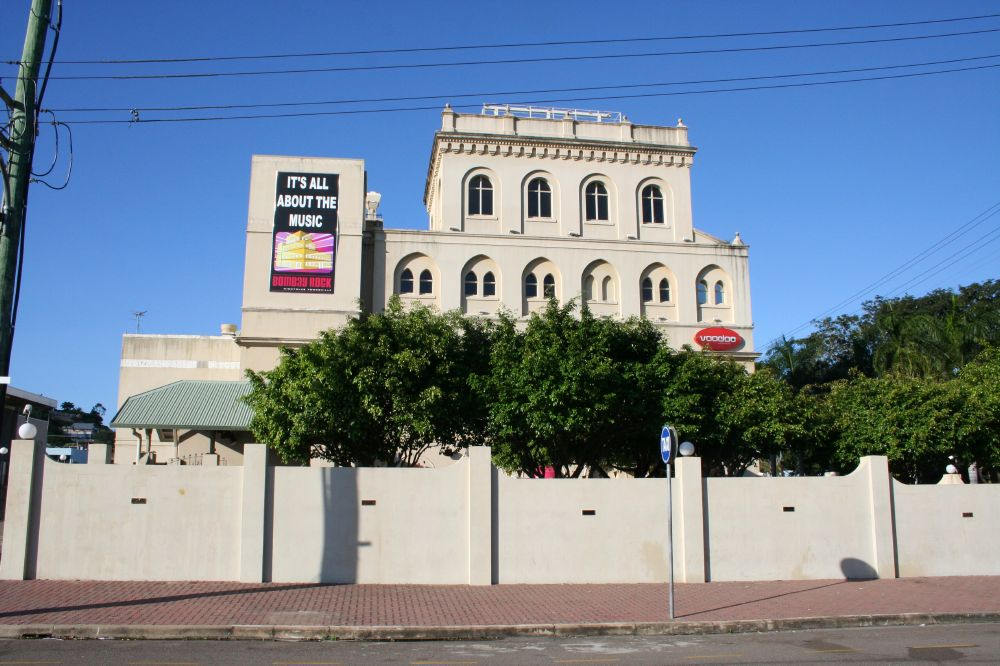
- The former Lion Brewery

- Location within Queensland Location within Australia
- 19.2668°S 146.8092°E
- Location: 719–741 Flinders Street, Townsville CBD, City of Townsville, Queensland, Australia

History
- Design period: 1870s–1890s (late 19th century)
- Built: 1894

Site notes
- Architect: John B Nicholson

Queensland Heritage Register
- Official name: Lion Brewery (former), Eagers Showroom, Playpen, Townsville Brewery
- Type: state heritage (built)
- Designated: 30 July 2004
- Reference no.: 602160
- Significant period: 1894 (fabric); 1894–1929, 1942–1945
- Significant components: tower – processing, cellar, factory building
- Builders: Madsen & Watson

Lion Brewery is a heritage-listed former brewery at 719–741 Flinders Street, Townsville CBD, City of Townsville, Queensland, Australia. It was designed by John B Nicholson and built in 1894 by Madsen & Watson. It is also known as Eagers Showroom, Playpen, and Townsville Brewery. It was added to the Queensland Heritage Register on 30 July 2004.

== History ==
The former Lion Brewery, a substantial two storey brick building with a four storey tower, was erected in 1894 for Samuel Allen, a Townsville businessman and Albert Lanfear, a brewer from Brisbane. On opening in late 1894, it became the third brewery then operating in Townsville. It was designed by Brisbane-based architects, JB Nicholson and his former partner ARL Wright, who had previously worked for Lanfear in Brisbane. Of a number of substantial 19th century breweries built in Queensland it is the only known example still in existence.

Samuel Allen, the managing director of Samuel Allen and Sons, an established North Queensland company and the agents for the West End Brewery, formed a partnership in 1893 with Albert Lanfear, a founding partner and manager of the West End Brewery and the West End Ice Works. Two breweries were already operating in Townsville: Martin's and Sons New City Brewery and the North Queensland Brewing Company. Allen and Lanfear planned to build a larger scale operation that would provide beer for North Queensland. Although economic recession was affecting most Australian colonies in the 1890s Townsville's economy was expanding and Allen and Lanfear purchased three allotments on the western end of Flinders Street opposite the railway goods yard.

John Beauchamp Nicholson was engaged to design the brewery. He had been the architect for additions to the West End Brewery in 1888–89. In 1890 Nicholson formed a partnership with Alfred Robert Linus Wright. They were the architects of some of Brisbane's most distinctive hotels, such as the Normanby Hotel 1889–1890 and Chardon's Hotel 1891–92. In 1890 they designed the Wine and Spirit Store at the West End Ice Works, for Albert Lanfear, and between 1890 and 1893 they carried out further additions to the West End Brewery. The partnership officially ended in 1891 but in a special supplement of The Queenslander, March 16, 1895 both Nicholson and Wright are credited with the design and Nicholson with supervision of the project.

Nicholson and Wright went to considerable effort to design a building for the Townsville site that was not only efficient as a brewery but had aesthetic merit and was more than just a large industrial structure. The appearance of the building was praised in contemporary publications. Described as the "most elegant building in Townsville", the playful use of ornament and variation of window openings contributed to its "picturesqueness of design and gracefulness of outline". The fenestration on each level was addressed differently, varying from simple arches on the ground level to gothic forms on the third level. Other features included a truncated pyramid roof on the tower surmounted by an elaborate wrought iron structure with flagpole, Boyle's patent ventilators, an octagonal chimney and ornamental cornices and mouldings, especially on the tower.

Brisbane contractors Madsen and Watson were engaged to construct the building for a sum of £6500. The building was constructed of red brick with white brick around the openings and measured 110 feet (34 m) along the Flinders Street frontage by 66 feet (20 m) deep. The main part of the building, comprising two storeys and a cellar, adjoined a tower 95 feet (29 m) in height. A boiler house at the rear of the brewery was also built. The brewery began production in the latter part of 1894 and was called the "Lion Brewery".

In addition to its equipment the brewery contained machinery for manufacturing aerated water and ice. The brewing system was based on the gravitational principle and was extensively described in the Australian Brewers' Journal, July 20, 1895. Water was raised by a pump to an iron tank at the top of the tower and passed into water-coolers and then insulated tanks on the floors below. Also housed in the tower were the hot-liquor vat, grist cases, mash tuns and the copper-room containing two open steam copper boilers. On the second floor were ammonia-condensing coils, refrigerators and a fermenting room; a large, lofty space with cavity walls to ensure a cool stable temperature. In the basement of the tower were the engine and mill rooms and the refrigerating and ice-making machinery. The remainder of the cellar and the main floor above were used for storage.

Despite the optimism of Allen and Lanfear, the brewery was not an immediate success. Problems with water and the competition with other breweries hindered development. After only four years of operation, the Lion Brewery amalgamated with the Charters Towers company, Towers Brewery, to form Northern Breweries (Queensland) Ltd. The Lion Brewery was renamed Townsville Brewery. Brewing continued but output and sales steadily declined. Brewing eventually ceased and for a period the complex was used for storage and warehousing. In 1929 the North Queensland Cool Storage Company acquired the site and used the property and facilities for the manufacture of ice and for cold storage.

The building was requisitioned and used as a warehouse by the United States Army during the Second World War. Like other tall structures in Townsville the upper part of the chimney was demolished during the war and possibly, the roof and crown of the main tower were also removed at this time. The property was vacant for several years after the war until it was occupied by EG Eagers and Sons, car dealers, and used as their north Queensland headquarters and Townsville showroom.

In 1988 the building was sold and converted into a nightclub. Changes to the building fabric included the addition of a lift to the tower; additions to the northern side of the building housing basement store and car park, escape stairs, toilets and a stage; and additions to the western side against Knapp Street including an entry court, beer garden and perimeter wall. Most of these additions were constructed of rendered concrete block. Shutters shown in early drawings have been replaced with fixed glass. Many changes have been made to the interior of the building including installation of air conditioning, fixtures associated with the nightclub, new stairs and openings in floors and masonry walls. In 2010 the building operates as a live music and entertainment venue.

In 2016 the building was sold to Dean Bodle and converted into a health hub.

== Description ==
Located at the western end of Flinders Street near the corner of Knapp Street, the former Lion Brewery is in a semi-industrial area of Townsville, opposite the former railway yards and a two storey hotel on the corner with Knapp Street. Set back from the corner, but built to the Flinders Street alignment, it is an imposing multi-storeyed brick building consisting of two main storeys and a tower on the south western end of the site. Originally red brick with contrasting white window surrounds, the building is now painted.

The main entrance is located on the western side under a metal hip-roofed porch, a recent addition. Adjacent to the entrance is a walled courtyard which occupies the street corner and has a number of trees growing in it. An entrance centred on the southern Flinders Street facade is not original.

The building has two principal storeys. The lower storey windows, round arched with keystones, have been blanked out. On the second storey, windows with a shallow brick-arched top have been either blanked out or replaced with stained glass of recent origin. Painting has obscured some of the original detail. On the Flinders Street side, parapet walls decorated by simple pilasters and surmounted by ornamental domes supporting spheres conceal a double gable roof over the two storeyed section. A simple frieze extends around the building at the top of the second level.

Two additional storeys project above the frieze at the south western end of the building forming a tower. The third storey is approximately one third of the area of the building and has a triangular pediment in the centre of its Flinders Street elevation. This level has pairs of pointed-arch windows framed by a larger recessed arch. The fourth storey is slightly smaller, set back from the front and rear of the third level. Openings in the fourth level are round arches. A flat roof over the tower is concealed by a parapet with similar ornament to the lower parapet. An elaborate corbelled cornice embellishes the lower part of the parapet. A neon sign surmounts the tower which originally featured a decorative wrought iron crown and flagpole.

Although the interior of the building has been altered, the arrangement of spaces is essentially intact. The spaces in the tower comprise a series of small rooms with brick walls and arched brick openings. The spaces adjoining the tower on the lower two storeys are open plan with posts of various design. Parts of the second level floor have been removed to create new staircases and a void looking towards the new stage area. Much of the internal timber structure remains. This exposed timber structure consists of massive hardwood posts and beams with crude rounded capitals and trussed double gable roofs over the two storey section. Much of the internal linings are likely to be covered by later linings and joinery elements.

Substantial additions have been made to the rear of the brewery. Constructed largely of rendered concrete block with a gabled corrugated steel roof similar to the two original roofs, the additions include basement spaces, two fire escape stairs, toilets and a large stage area. A courtyard with perimeter wall and entry porch have been added to the Knapp Street corner. These additions to the rear and side are not considered to be of cultural heritage significance. When viewed from Flinders Street opposite the intersection with Knapp Street, Castle Hill makes a powerful setting for the former brewery; its presence behind all the blocks along the north-western side of Flinders Street being perceived most strikingly at the other intersections with perpendicular streets that occur along its course into the centre of the city.

== Heritage listing ==
The former Lion Brewery was listed on the Queensland Heritage Register on 30 July 2004 having satisfied the following criteria.

The place is important in demonstrating the evolution or pattern of Queensland's history.

The Lion Brewery is important in demonstrating the development of Townsville as north Queensland's principal regional centre in the late 19th century. It is surviving evidence of the growth of manufacturing in Townsville during this period, and is important historically in illustrating the development and expansion of the brewing industry in Queensland in the 19th century.

The place demonstrates rare, uncommon or endangered aspects of Queensland's cultural heritage.

The Lion Brewery is significant as the only surviving substantial 19th century brewery in Queensland.

The place is important in demonstrating the principal characteristics of a particular class of cultural places.

Although the interior has been altered, the Lion Brewery, in its arrangement of spaces and in its largely intact exterior, is important in demonstrating the principal characteristics of a substantial, rendered-brick, late 19th century brewery.

The place is important because of its aesthetic significance.

Designed by architects with expertise in breweries, the Lion Brewery is a prominent landmark in Flinders Street, the main street of Townsville. It dominates a corner at the intersection with Knapp Street, important in the comparative view provided of Castle Hill, a key Townsville landmark since the 1860s. The variety of ornament, free use of historical reference, pleasing composition and imposing mass of the building demonstrate aesthetic qualities that are valued in late 19th century architecture.
