= Brisbane Second Division Rugby League =

Second division of rugby league clubs in Brisbane

- Sport: Rugby league
- Instituted: 1971
- Number of teams: 55
- Country: Australia
- Website: www.qrl.com.au Rugby League Townsville & District

The Brisbane Second Division Rugby League (BSDRL) is the second division of rugby league clubs in Brisbane, Queensland, Australia.

== History ==
In 1971 the Brisbane Rugby League began a second division competition. This competition was for Under 23 teams in three grades, and was contested by the BRL clubs, University, Teachers and eight "satellite" clubs. By 1977 there were 15 teams competing in Northern and Southern Zones. Since 1981 the Second Division has used Davies Park, West End as its headquarters and finals venue.

There are four teams from 1971 that are still competing in the Second Division: Brighton, St Brendans, Sunnybank and Bulimba Valleys (formerly Valley United Stars). The most successful clubs between 1977 and 2004 have been Sunnybank (13 Premierships), Carina (12 premierships), St Brendans (10) and Banyo (8).

In 2007 there were 65 teams from 43 clubs playing in five open grade competitions, an Under 22 and an Under 20 competition. In 2006, there were 2575 registered players in the League. The Brisbane Second Division is one of the biggest Rugby League competitions in the world. In 2011, there were 81 teams in 9 Divisions from 45 clubs, 2012, again 9 Divisions from 49 clubs forming 80 teams, 2013, 9 Divisions, 46 Clubs 78 teams competing in our competition, 2014, 81 teams, 8 Divisions, 46 Clubs, 2015, 73 teams, 8 Divisions from 47 Clubs.

== Clubs ==
2019 BSDRL Clubs
Northside 1 (10)	Northside 2 (9)	Northside 3 (8)	Southside 1 (8)	Southside 2 (8)	Southside 3 (12)
Aspley Devils; Brisbane Natives RLFC; Brisbane Brothers; Dayboro Cowboys; Gators RLFC; North Lakes Kangaroos; Pine Central Holy Spirit Hornets; Wests Arana Hills Panthers; Wests Mitchelton Panthers; Valleys Diehards	Banyo Devils; Brighton Roosters; Gators RLFC (2); Narangba Rangers; Normanby Hounds; North Lakes Kangaroos (2); Pine Central Holy Spirit Hornets (2); Pine Rivers Bears; Wests Mitchelton Panthers (2)	Aspley Devils (2); Brighton Roosters (2); Burpengary Jets; North Lakes Kangaroos (3); Pine Rivers Bears (2); Samford Stags; Wests Mitchelton Panthers (3); Valleys Diehards (2)	Beenleigh Pride; Bulimba Valley Bulldogs; Carina Tigers; Easts Tigers; Logan Brothers RLFC; Redlands Parrots; Souths Sunnybank RLFC; Waterford Demons	Beenleigh Pride (2); Browns Plains Bears; Bulimba Valley Bulldogs (2); Carina Tigers (2); Eagleby Giants; Souths Acacia Ridge Magpies; Wynnum-Manly Seagulls	Beaudesert Kingfishers; Brothers St. Brendans RLFC; Capalaba Warriors; Logan Brothers RLFC (2); Logan Wanderers; Mt. Gravatt Eagles; Mustangs RLFC; North Stradbroke Island Sharks; Rochedale Tigers; Souths Inala Warriors; Redlands Parrots (2); Waterford Demons (2)

== Competitions ==
As of 2019, there were 6 Divisions in the BSDRL:

- Northside 1
- Northside 2
- Northside 3
- Southside 1
- Southside 2
- Southside 3

== Northside Division 1 ==
Club Colours	Club Nickname	Suburb
Aspley	Devils	Aspley
Brisbane Natives RLFC	Natives	Brisbane
Brisbane Brothers	Leprechauns	Brisbane
Dayboro	Cowboys	Dayboro
Gators RLFC	Gators	Brisbane
North Lakes	Kangaroos	Griffin
Pine Central Holy Spirit	Hornets	Brisbane
Wests Arana Hills	Panthers	Arana Hills
Wests Mitchelton	Panthers	Mitchelton
Valleys	Diehards	Fortitude Valley

== Northside Division 2 ==
Club Colours	Club Nickname	Suburb
Banyo	Devils	Banyo
Brighton	Roosters	Brighton
Gators RLFC	Gators	Brisbane
Narangba	Rangers	Narangba
Normanby	Hounds	Brisbane
North Lakes	Kangaroos	Griffin
Pine Central Holy Spirit	Hornets	Brisbane
Pine Rivers Bears	Panthers	Pine Rivers
Wests Mitchelton	Panthers	Mitchelton

== Northside Division 3 ==
Club Colours	Club Nickname	Suburb
Aspley	Devils	Aspley
Brighton	Roosters	Brighton
Burpengary	Jets	Burpengary
North Lakes	Kangaroos	Griffin
Pine Rivers Bears	Panthers	Pine Rivers
Samford	Stags	Samford
Wests Mitchelton	Panthers	Mitchelton
Valleys	Diehards	Fortitude Valley

== Southside Division 1 ==
Club Colours	Club Nickname	Suburb
Beenleigh	Pride	Beenleigh
Bulimba Valleys	Bulldogs	Bulimba
Carina	Tigers	Carina
Easts	Tigers	Coorparoo
Logan Brothers	Leprechauns	Logan
Redlands	Parrots	Redland
Souths Sunnybank	Magpies	Sunnybank
Waterford	Demons	Waterford

== Southside Division 2 ==
Club Colours	Club Nickname	Suburb
Beenleigh	Pride	Beenleigh
Browns Plains	Bears	Browns Plains
Bulimba Valleys	Bulldogs	Bulimba
Carina	Tigers	Carina
Eagleby	Giants	Eagleby
Souths Acacia Ridge	Magpies	Acacia Ridge
Wynnum-Manly	Seagulls	Wynnum

== Southside Division 3 ==
Club Colours	Club Nickname	Suburb
Beaudesert	Kingfishers	Beaudesert
Brothers St. Brendans RLFC	Leprechauns	Brisbane
Capalaba	Warriors	Capalaba
Logan Brothers RLFC	Leprechauns	Logan
Logan Wanderers	Wanderers	Logan
Mt. Gravatt	Eagles	Mount Gravatt
Mustangs RLFC	Mustangs	Brisbane
North Stradbroke Island	Sharks	North Stradbroke Island
Rochedale	Tigers	Rochedale
Souths Inala	Warriors	Inala
Redlands	Parrots	Redland
Waterford	Demons	Waterford

== See also ==
- Rugby League Competitions in Australia
- Brisbane A-Grade Rugby League
- Ipswich Rugby League
- Gold Coast Rugby League
- Sunshine Coast Gympie Rugby League
