= Hills District =

Hills District may refer to:

== Places ==
- Hills District, New South Wales
- Hills District, Queensland

== See also ==
- Hills District Bulls, Rugby league team in Sydney
- Hills District Panthers, Rugby league team in Brisbane
- Hill District (Pittsburgh)
