= Wayne Stewart =

Wayne Stewart may refer to:

- Wayne Stewart (American football) (1947–2020), American football tight end
- Wayne Stewart (rugby league) (born 1951), Australian rugby league player
