= Brisbane Rugby League (2001) =

Ten-team competition

Brisbane Rugby League A Grade
- Sport: Rugby league
- Inaugural season: 2001
- Chair: Sharon Hickey
- Number of teams: 10
- Country: Australia (QRL)
- Premiers: Redcliffe Dolphins (2026)
- Website: Rugby League Brisbane
- Related competition: Queensland Cup; Brisbane Second Division Rugby League

The Brisbane Rugby League (otherwise known as the CAOS BRL Premier A Grade due to sponsorship purposes; formerly known as the Quest Cup, Mixwell Cup, FOGS Cup and In Safe Hands Cup) is a rugby league football competition in Queensland, Australia. It is the division below the Queensland Cup and above the Brisbane Second Division Rugby League, and is generally regarded as the successor competition to the original Brisbane Rugby League which folded in 1997. It currently has ten teams, expanded from a six-team competition in 2020.

== History ==
It started in 2001, then known as the Quest Cup, changing its name to the Mixwell Cup in 2003, and becoming the FOGS Cup in 2006. FOGS in an acronym for Former Origin Greats.

On 26 September 2014, the South East Queensland Division of the QRL announced that they would dissolve the current structure of the FOGS Cup and reform the Brisbane Rugby League.

== Clubs ==
It was announced in August 2019 that Queensland Cup clubs would withdraw their direct team presence and instead formalise affiliate relationships with local clubs in an effort to expand the competition and create opportunities for players at the local level, seeing many local clubs return to A-Grade level.

=== Current Clubs (2025-present) ===
Teams for the 2025 season
Colours	Team name	Nickname	Home ground	Premierships
	Carina	Tigers	Leo Williams Oval	None
	Fortitude Valley	Diehards	Emerson Park	2017, 2021
	Logan	Pride	Meakin Park	None
	Redcliffe	Dolphins	Kayo Stadium	2003, 2010–12, 2013, 2016, 2025-26
	Souths Logan	Magpies	Brandon Park	None
	Wests	Panthers	Frank Lind Oval	2009, 2022
	Wynnum-Manly Seagulls	Seagulls	BMD Kougari Oval	2007, 2018–2020, 2023
	Brighton	Roosters	Jim Lawrie Oval / Kayo Stadium	Reserve Grade Side to Redcliffe
	Wynnum-Manly Juniors	Seagulls	Kitchener Park	Reserve Grade Side to Wynnum-Manly Seagulls

=== Former Clubs (2001-2024) ===
Rugby League Team name	Nickname	Home ground	Premierships
Bulimba Valley	Bulldogs	Balmoral Recreation Reserve	None
Burleigh	Bears	Pizzey Park	2006
Easts	Tigers	Langlands Park	2001–02, 2004–05, 2008, 2013
Ipswich	Jets	North Ipswich Reserve	None
Logan	Brothers	Logan Brothers JRL	None
Normanby	Hounds	Bert St Clair Oval	None
Norths	Devils	Bishop Park	None
Pine Rivers	Bears	Mathieson Oval	None
Tweed Heads	Seagulls	Piggabeen Sports Complex	None

== Premiership winners ==
Premiership results by season, showing grand final scores
Season	Brisbane Rugby League Premiers	Score	Brisbane Rugby League Runner–up	Minor Premiers	Wooden Spoon
2001	Easts Tigers	24–18	Norths Devils		
2002	Easts Tigers	16–8	Redcliffe Dolphins		
2003	Redcliffe Dolphins	19–6	Wynnum-Manly Seagulls		
2004	Easts Tigers	21–20	Burleigh Bears		
2005	Easts Tigers	31–22	Burleigh Bears		
2006	Burleigh Bears	28–6	Tweed Heads Seagulls		
2007	Wynnum-Manly Seagulls	52–18	Ipswich Jets	Wynnum-Manly Seagulls	
2008	Easts Tigers	12–10	Wynnum-Manly Seagulls		
2009	Wests Panthers	30–24	Redcliffe Dolphins	Redcliffe Dolphins	
2010	Redcliffe Dolphins	26–14	Burleigh Bears		
2011	Redcliffe Dolphins	30–18	Norths Devils		
2012	Redcliffe Dolphins	22–12	Wynnum-Manly Seagulls		
2013	Easts Tigers	26–16	Redcliffe Dolphins		
2014	Redcliffe Dolphins	34–20	Burleigh Bears		
2015	Burleigh Bears	22–12	Wynnum-Manly Seagulls		
2016	Redcliffe Dolphins	31–30	Ipswich Jets	Wynnum-Manly Seagulls	Logan Brothers
2017	Fortitude Valley Diehards	16–12	Redcliffe Dolphins	Redcliffe Dolphins	Logan Brothers
2018	Wynnum-Manly Seagulls	28–20	Redcliffe Dolphins	Redcliffe Dolphins	Souths Logan Magpies
2019	Wynnum-Manly Seagulls	22–20	Fortitude Valley Diehards	Wests Panthers	Souths Logan Magpies
2020	Wynnum-Manly Seagulls	41–6	Wests Panthers	Fortitude Valley Diehards	Bulimba Bulldogs
2021	Fortitude Valley Diehards	20–18	Wests Panthers	Normanby Hounds	Easts Tigers
2022	Wests Panthers	36–16	Wynnum-Manly Seagulls	Wests Panthers	Souths Logan Magpies
2023	Wynnum-Manly Seagulls	28–18	Bulimba Bulldogs	Bulimba Bulldogs	Pine Rivers Bears
2024	Wynnum-Manly Seagulls	24–20	Wests Panthers	Wests Panthers	Normanby Hounds
2025	Redcliffe Dolphins	32–12	Carina Tigers	Redcliffe Dolphins	Souths Logan Magpies
2026	Redcliffe Dolphins	20–18	Wests Panthers	Redcliffe Dolphins	Logan Pride

== See also ==
- Queensland Cup
- Queensland Rugby League
- Rugby League Competitions in Australia
