= Western Suburbs DRLFC =

Western Suburbs DRLFC may refer to:

- Western Suburbs District Rugby League Football Club, the official name of the Western Suburbs Magpies of Sydney.
- Western Suburbs District Rugby League Football Club, the former name of the Western Suburbs Panthers of Brisbane.
