= Redlands District Rugby League Football Club =

Australian rugby team

Redlands Parrots
Club information
- Full name: Redlands District Rugby League Football Club
- Nickname: Parrots
- Short name: Redlands Parrots
- Colours: Red; Green

Current details
- Ground: Pinklands Reserve
- Competition: Brisbane Rugby League

The Redlands District Rugby League Football Club was formed in 1971 and plays out of Pinklands Reserve, in Thornlands in the City of Redland, Queensland, Australia.

Redlands seniors compete in the Brisbane Rugby League and the Brisbane Second Division Rugby League while the junior teams compete in the Greater Brisbane Junior Rugby League.

The nickname of the club comes from the large flocks of rainbow lorikeets that live in the Redlands area.
