= Brighton Terrace =

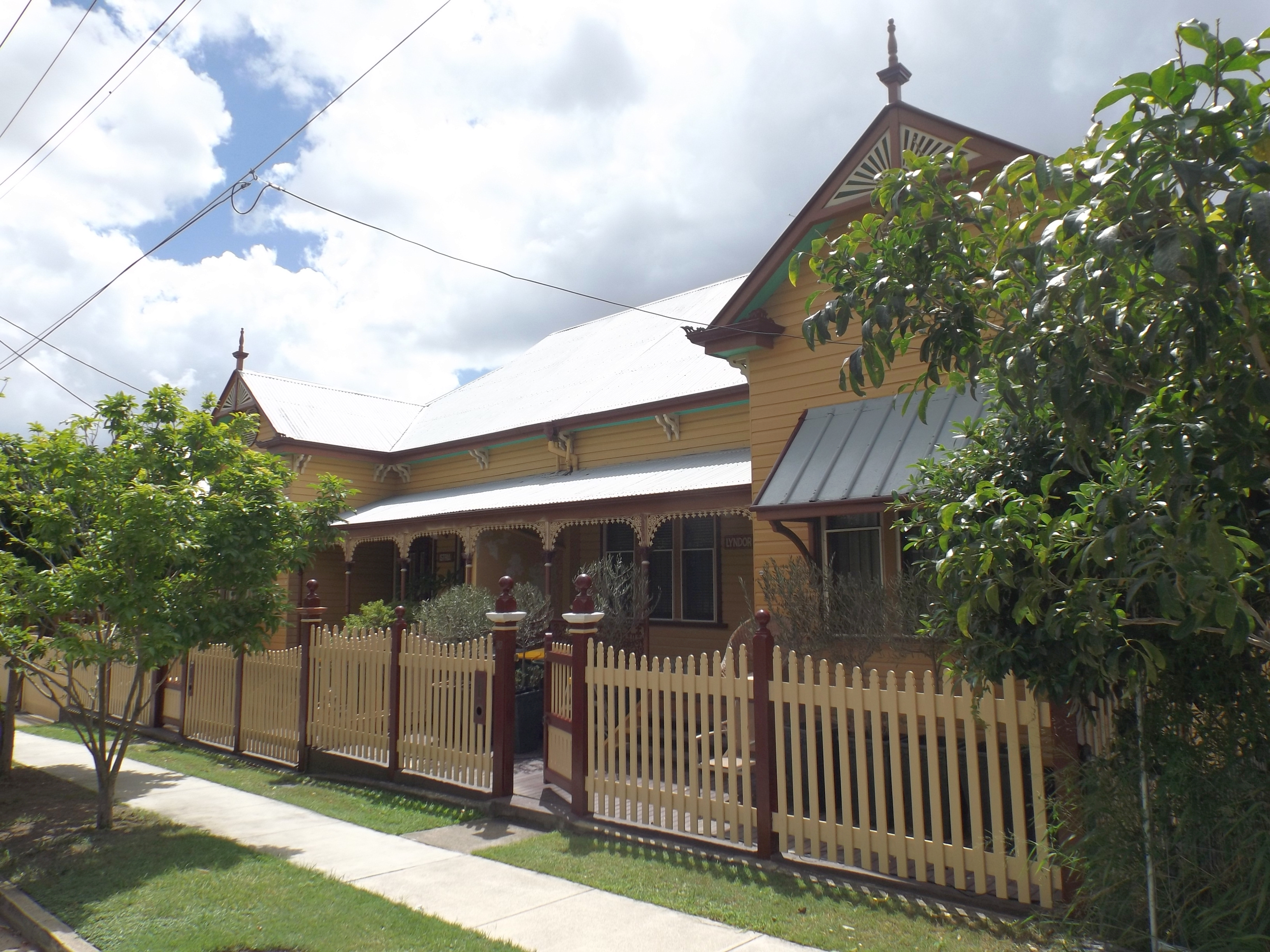
- The two terraces on the south end, 2015

- Location within Queensland Location within Australia
- 27.4827°S 153.0131°E
- Location: 30 Sussex Street, West End, Queensland, Australia

History
- Design period: 1870s–1890s (late 19th century)
- Built: 1887–1890

Site notes
- Architect: John Beauchamp Nicholson

Queensland Heritage Register
- Official name: Brighton Terrace
- Type: state heritage (built)
- Designated: 21 October 1992
- Reference no.: 600343
- Significant period: 1880s–1890s (fabric, historical)
- Significant components: basement / sub-floor, residential accommodation – maisonette/s / duplex

Brighton Terrace is a heritage-listed duplex at 30 Sussex Street, West End, Queensland, Australia. It was designed by John Beauchamp Nicholson and built from 1887 to 1890. It was added to the Queensland Heritage Register on 21 October 1992.

== History ==
Brighton Terrace, which consists of two sets of identical pairs of semi-detached houses, was apparently built for investment purposes for Emile Adrian Gaujard in 1889–90. Tenders for the construction of the four houses were called on 6 August 1887 by John B. Nicholson, a successful Brisbane architect who prospered in the boom conditions of the late 1880s. Gaujard was a wholesale and retail tobacconist and importer of Gaujard and Elson, which was located in Queen Street, Brisbane. The first two houses were completed in 1889 and were immediately let to A. Mirls, a commercial traveller and WH Robertson, a bank manager. Despite completion in 1890, the second pair of houses were not occupied until 1894. Each of the four houses was individually identified with its own name.

At the time of Brighton Terrace's construction, South Brisbane as in other parts of city, was experiencing a boom period. Residential expansion for respectable middle-class families proliferated in South Brisbane, with the predominant housing type being the four roomed timber cottage with a corrugated iron roof. Terrace housing was not particularly popular as a housing style in early Brisbane, especially amongst the land authorities who were unhappy with the small allotments that resulted after subdivision of the multi-dwelling properties. The passing of the Undue Subdivision of Land Prevention Act in 1885 abruptly brought an end to the early style of terrace housing in Brisbane. In response, developments, such as Brighton Terrace, were introduced as an alternative to terrace housing that retained some cost benefits in construction. The advantage of building Brighton Terrace as a pair of residences on two allotments was that each pair could be legally sold separately. Most houses in the vicinity of Brighton Terrace were privately owned residences owned by clerks, salesmen and accountants.

Upon the death of Gaujard, ownership of the four houses passed to his daughter Helene Therese Nicol, who was spouse of George Bruce Nicol, co-founder of the West End Brewery. The property was sold in 1923 and later, with the addition of fibrous cement sheeting and internal subdivision, converted into twelve flats. In 1990 the buildings were substantially renovated back into four residences and individually sold.

== Description ==
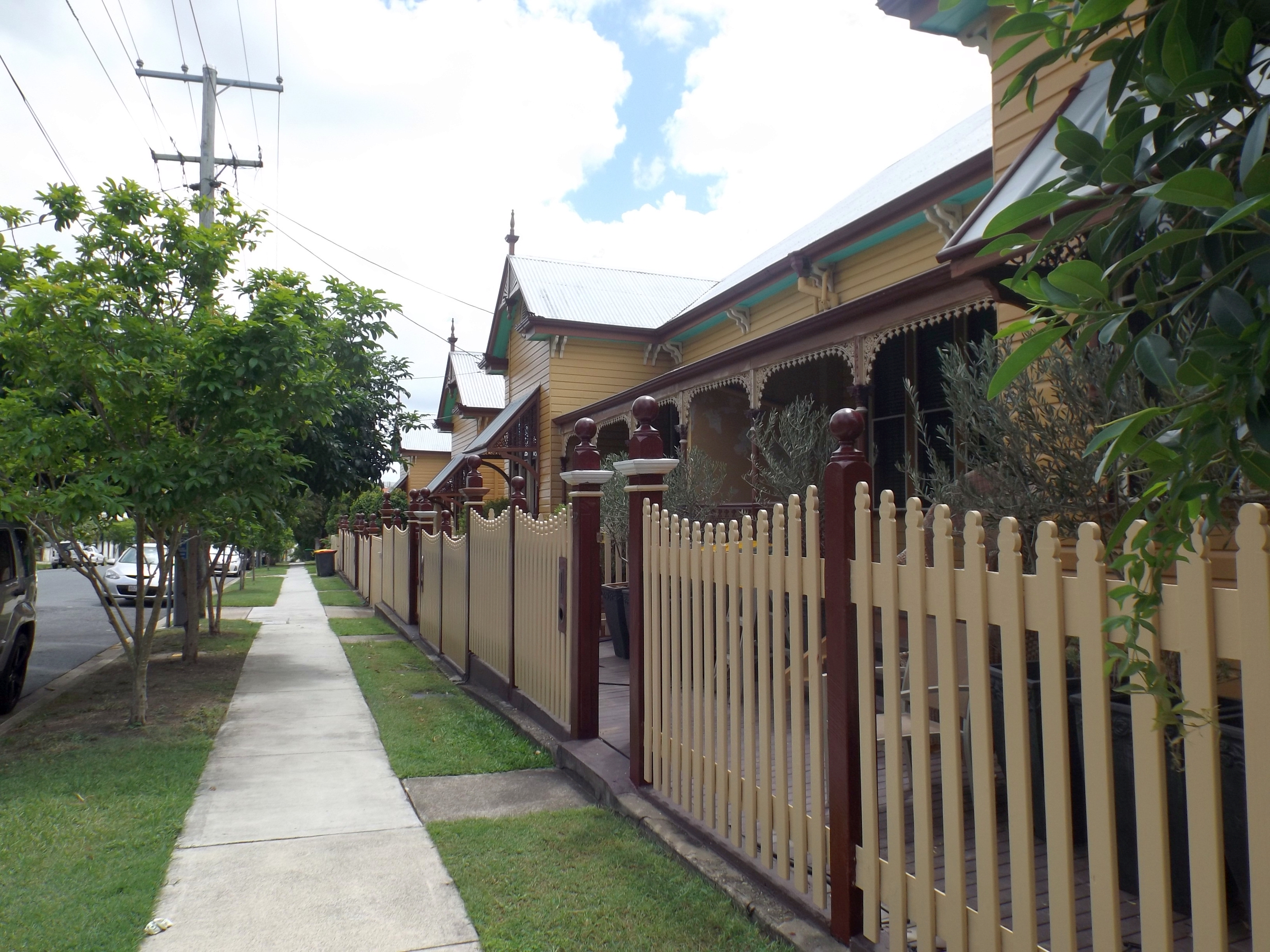
Residences and footpath, 2015

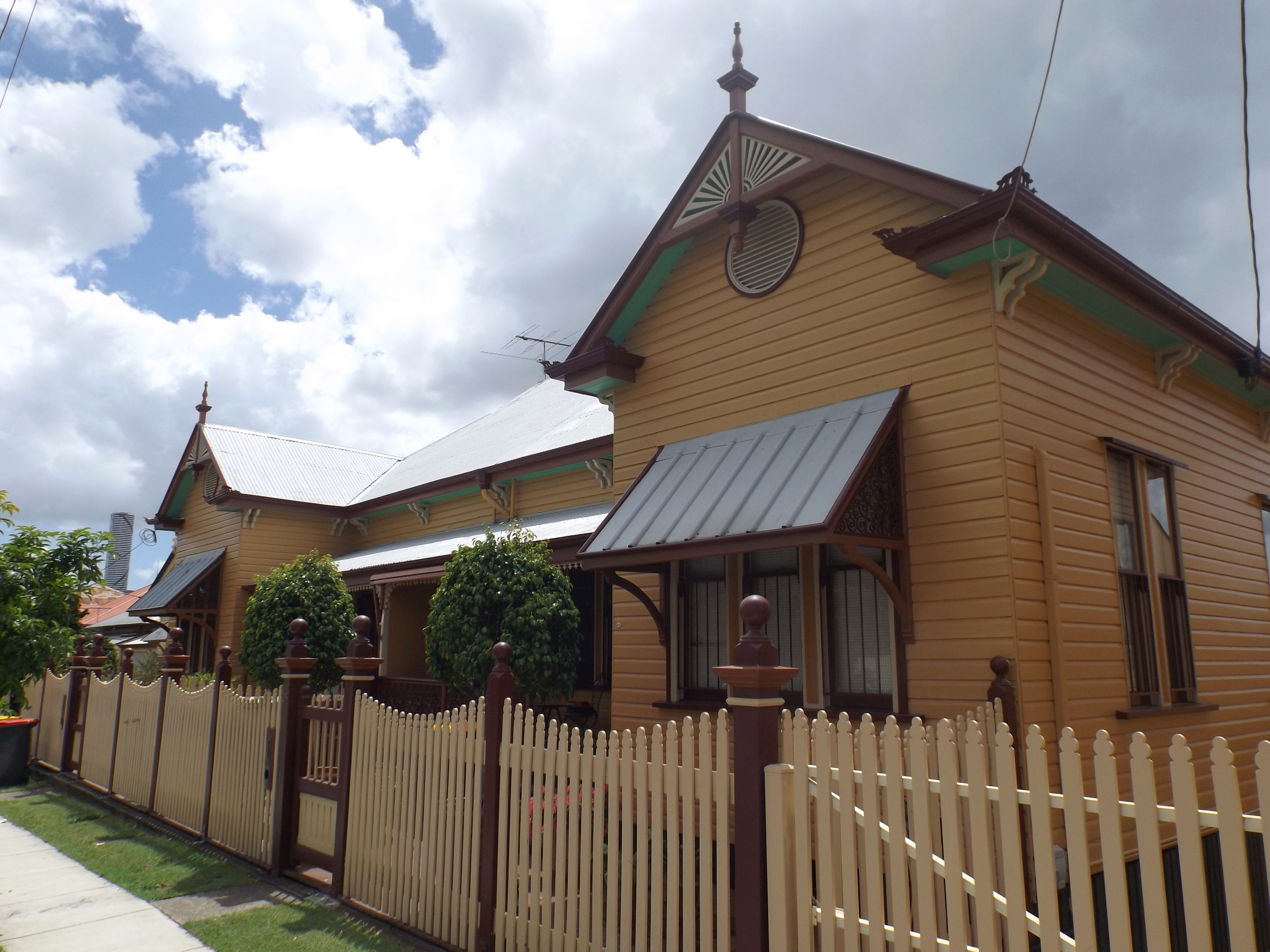
The two houses at the northern end, 2015

Brighton Terrace is built on steeply sloped land that drops down from the street frontage and overlooks Brisbane city. The timber picket fence that extends across the entire street length of the terrace was constructed in 1990. Wooden decking provides access to the houses that are set back from the street boundary. Gardens exist only at the rear of the properties where the land evens out. No original vegetation survives as the grounds were extensively re-landscaped with palm trees, low shrubbery and brick paving in 1990.

The four residences which collectively form Brighton Terrace are basically identical. The timber houses are each single storied at street level, with a subfloor level at the rear where the land falls away. Each pair of residences is housed under a single gabled hip roof that is clad in corrugated iron. Projecting gables at the front of each house are decorated with timber sunburst designs and finials while the eaves have pairs of brackets. The exterior walls are clad with narrow chamferboards. Windows at the front of each house are timber framed double hung sashes that have been grouped in threes.

Each house consists of six main rooms and three bathrooms, the plan of which is roughly rectangular. The facades are asymmetrically arranged so that the front bedroom of each house projects forward and a small verandah is created. Original cast iron lacework and posts decorate the front verandahs and the window hood brackets. At the rear of each house are verandahs at two levels that are decorated with introduced timber balustrading and decorative timber brackets. The verandahs are separated by a deep timber valance and the soffits are fitted with introduced ripple iron that has been painted. The brick firewalls which separate the pairs of residences, are cement rendered at the front of the properties only and plastered internally. The internal partition walls at street level are single skinned with vertical beaded tongue and groove boards on a timber frame. The ceilings are also tongue and grooved boards except in the living and dining rooms where plasterboard with plaster ceiling roses has been introduced. At the lower level the walls and ceilings are all plasterboard on timber frames. Floors throughout the house are timber boards overlaid with carpet in the main rooms and vinyl or ceramic tiles in the kitchen and bathrooms. Some original cedar joinery such as architraves and four panelled doors survive at the street level, however most, including the timber fireplace surrounds and the timber consoles in the entry hall, have been introduced during the 1990 renovations. Obscure patterned glass has been fitted into the fanlights above each door at street level and coloured glass into the sidelights of the front door. Each house has two sets of staircases connecting the two floor levels; one internal and the other external. The internal staircase has been entirely reconstructed however the external staircase at the rear contains some original fabric at its upper reaches. The existing kitchen and bathroom fittings and fixtures were all introduced at the time of renovation.

At the rear of each property is a large gabled timber garage with loft above. The structures were constructed in 1990. Access to the garages is via a common driveway located between the two pairs of residences.

== Heritage listing ==
Brighton Terrace was listed on the Queensland Heritage Register on 21 October 1992 having satisfied the following criteria.

The place is important in demonstrating the evolution or pattern of Queensland's history.

Brighton Terrace, completed in 1890, is important for its ability to visually demonstrate an unusual response to the Undue Subdivision of Land Prevention Act of 1885 had on the built environment of Brisbane during the boom of the late 1880s.

The place demonstrates rare, uncommon or endangered aspects of Queensland's cultural heritage.

This particular response, which involved the speculative construction of an identical pair of semi-detached houses built in timber on two separate allotments, was comparatively rare in Brisbane.

The place is important in demonstrating the principal characteristics of a particular class of cultural places.

The terrace is important as an example of multi dwelling construction that was uncommon in Brisbane in the late nineteenth century.

The place is important because of its aesthetic significance.

The residences are of considerable aesthetic significance for their strong contribution to the streetscape, currently enhanced by their coordinated colour scheme and detailing.
