= Logan Brothers Rugby League Football Club =

Australian rugby league football club

Logan Brothers
Club information
- Full name: Logan Brothers Rugby League Football Club
- Nickname: The leprechauns
- Short name: Logan Brothers
- Colours: Green; Yellow; White
- Founded: 1977

Current details
- Ground: Civic Park
- Competition: Brisbane Second Division Rugby League

The Logan Brothers Rugby League Football Club, commonly known as The Leprechauns, is based in Logan Central, Logan City, Queensland, Australia.

Logan Brothers competes in the Brisbane Rugby League and the Brisbane Second Division Rugby League with the club playing out of Civic Park in Logan Central.

The club was formed at the St Pauls Convent in 1977.

== Notable players ==
The following is a list of former Logan Brothers players who are also past or present professional rugby league players:

- Corey Allan
- Gerard Beale
- JJ Collins
- Ben Czislowski
- George Fai
- Moeaki Fotuaika
- Martin Gleeson
- Brenko Lee
- Ricky Leutele
- Brad Meyers
- Josh Papalii
- Corey Parker
- Chris Sandow
- Junior Sa'u
- Cameron Smith
- Jaydn Su'a
- Esi Tonga
- Ryan Tongia
- Lote Tuqiri
- Antonio Winterstein
- William Zillman
