= Normanby Fiveways =

Intersection of five major roads in Queensland, Australia

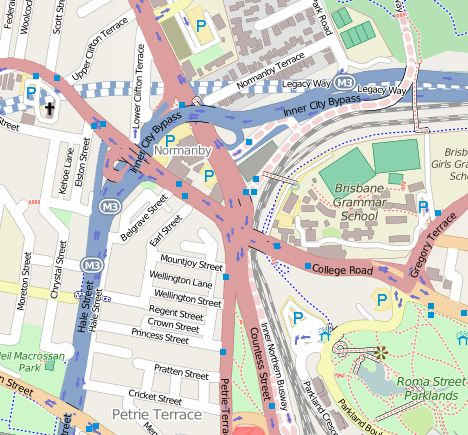
Normanby Fiveways, 2015

The Normanby Fiveways is the intersection of five major roads to the north-east of the Brisbane central business district, Queensland, Australia.

== Geography ==
The intersection consists of:

- Musgrave Road to the north-west towards Red Hill and beyond to Brisbane's north-western suburbs. Musgrave Road becomes Waterworks Road at Red Hill, and links to outer-western suburbs such as Ashgrove and The Gap
- Kelvin Grove Road to the north towards Kelvin Grove and beyond to Brisbane northern suburbs
- College Road to the east towards Spring Hill beyond to the north-eastern suburbs
- Countess Street to the south-east towards the Brisbane CBD and the William Jolly Bridge to the southern suburbs
- Petrie Terrace (the road) to the south-west towards Petrie Terrace (the suburb) and to the western suburbs

== History ==
The intersection takes its name from the Normanby Hotel on the corner of Musgrave Road and Kelvin Grove Road, which in turn was named in 1872 most likely after the recently appointed Governor of Queensland, George Phipps, 2nd Marquess of Normanby.

The opening of the Grey Street Bridge (subsequently renamed the William Jolly Bridge) in 1932 had considerable impact on the Normanby Fiveways. The Grey Street Bridge was intended to relieve congestion on the Victoria Bridge and streets in the Brisbane central business district by allowing traffic between the suburbs on either side of the river to bypass the CBD. However, this created additional traffic into the Normanby Fiveways, which with its unusual five-way traffic movement turned the Normanby Fiveways into one of Brisbane's most dangerous intersections. As a consequence, the introduction of traffic lights to manage traffic flow through the intersection was proposed in 1939.

However, by 1952, the Norman Fiveways was now the most congested intersection in Brisbane yet no action had been taken to introduce traffic lights as the government did not have the funds. Traffic lights and alternative strategies such as a subway to carry traffic going between Countess Street and Kelvin Grove Road continued to be proposed.

In 1953, tenders were called for the provision of traffic lights which would be the most complicated traffic light system in Brisbane, due to the peculiar five-way character of the intersection. Meanwhile, a ban on paying police for overtime work meant the police who directed the traffic through the Normanby Fiveways finished work in the middle of the evening peak hour, creating traffic chaos.

As at 2015, Petrie Terrace (the road) is one-way north into the Fiveways while Countess Street is one-way south, simplifying traffic movement through the (now traffic light controlled) intersection. The construction of the Inner City Bypass and the Go Between Bridge have removed much of the long-distance north-south traffic away from the Normanby Fiveways. The opening of the Legacy Tunnel in 2015 was intended to redirect a greater proportion of traffic to and from the western suburbs away from the Normanby Fiveways.
