= Hills District Panthers =

Club information
- Full name: Hills District Rugby League Football Club
- Nickname(s): The Panthers,
- Colours: Red; Black; White; Blue
- Founded: 2005

Current details
- Ground(s): Kev McKell Oval
- Competition: Mixwell Cup and Mixwell Colts Challenge
- 2015: 3rd
- Current season

The Hills District Panthers is a defunct rugby league club from Brisbane, Australia. The Panthers played only one year, 2005, in the Mixwell Cup and Mixwell Colts Challenge. They were formed by the Arana Hills Panthers, a satellite club of the Wests Panthers, and while failed to make the finals of the Mixwell Cup, made the finals of the Mixwell Colts Challenge.

The Panthers adopted the Red and Black of Wests, along with Blue and White showed the Cronulla Sharks involvement with the club.

Towards the end of 2005, Hills District and Wests decided to enter a joint venture and be called Western Districts Panthers, playing out of Arana's Kev McKell Oval.
