= Normanby Hounds =

Club information
- Full name: Normanby Rugby League Football Club
- Nickname: Hounds
- Short name: Normanby Hounds
- Colours: Blue; White
- Founded: 1947

Current details
- Competition: Brisbane Rugby League

The Normanby Rugby League Football Club, commonly known as the Normanby Hounds, was formed at the Normanby Hotel in 1947.

The club first competed in the Shiftworkers rugby league competition in 1950, losing in the semi-final to Nundah 6-23. In 1952, Normanby defeated Hamilton 16–14 at Hamilton Oval to win their first Shiftworkers' rugby league premiership. The same year, Normanby's B Grade team won the premiership, defeating Hamilton 21–12.

Normanby competes in the Brisbane Rugby League and the Brisbane Second Division Rugby League.

== See also ==
- Brisbane Rugby League
