= John Beauchamp Nicholson =

Australian architect

John Beauchamp Nicholson was an architect in Brisbane, Queensland, Australia. A number of his works are heritage-listed.

== Early life ==
John Beauchamp Nicholson was born in 1852 in Surry and arrived in Brisbane around 1876.

== Architectural career ==
After working as a clerk and foreman for the contractor and later architect, Andrew Murphie and for plumber Hiram Wakefield, he set up an architectural office in October 1885. He worked in partnership with Constantin Mathea between 1886 and January 1887, with J Sinclair Ferguson and with Alfred R L Wright from March 1890 until going into involuntary liquidation in January 1891. During these few years, Nicholson's office designed a variety of handsome and substantial buildings including Lady Musgrave Lodge in 1891 and the 1888 Princess Theatre at Woolloongabba, though a good proportion of the work catered for the liquor trade and included a number of fine hotels and the Lion Brewery in Townsville.

== Works ==
His architectural works include:

- Brighton Terrace, West End (1887)
- Princess Theatre, Woolloongabba (1888)
- Taylor-Heaslop Building, Woolloongabba (1889)
- Norman Hotel, Woolloongabba (1889)
- Normanby Hotel, Red Hill (1889)
