= Norman Hotel =

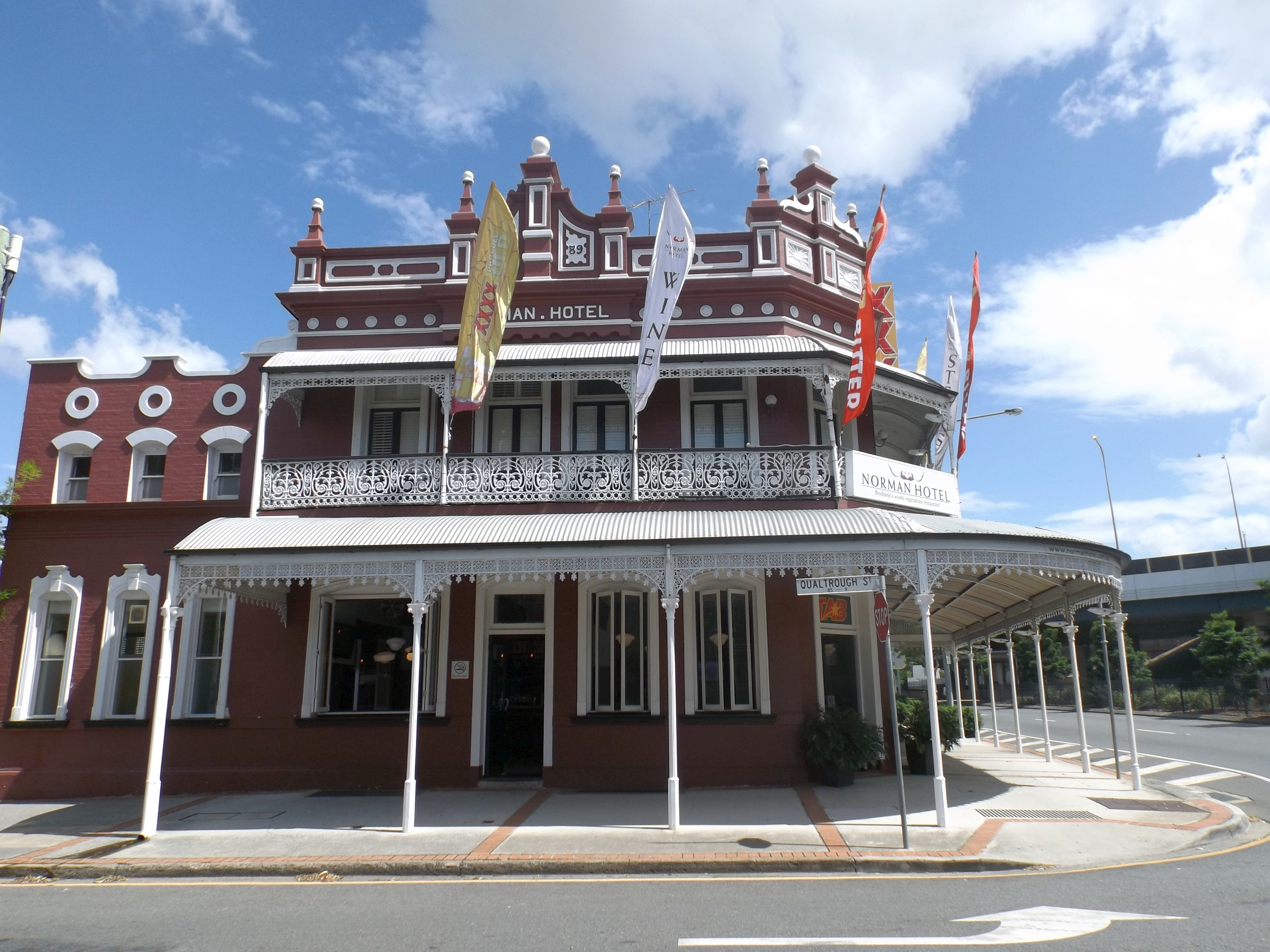
- Building in 2015

- Location within Queensland Location within Australia
- 27.4919°S 153.0353°E
- Location: 102 Ipswich Road, Woolloongabba, City of Brisbane, Queensland, Australia

History
- Design period: 1870s–1890s (late 19th century)
- Built: 1889–1890

Site notes
- Architect: John Beauchamp Nicholson

Queensland Heritage Register
- Official name: Norman Hotel
- Type: state heritage (built)
- Designated: 12 July 2005
- Reference no.: 602539
- Significant period: 1880s, 1890s (fabric); 1890–ongoing (historical use)
- Significant components: cellar

Norman Hotel is a heritage-listed hotel at 102 Ipswich Road, Woolloongabba, City of Brisbane, Queensland, Australia. It was designed by John Beauchamp Nicholson and built from 1889 to 1890. It was added to the Queensland Heritage Register on 12 July 2005.

== History ==
The Norman Hotel was built in 1889 for Robert Heaslop to a design from the office of John Beauchamp Nicholson. It is a brick hotel prominently sited at the corner of Qualtrough Street on the busy Ipswich Road.

In 1859, at the time of separation from New South Wales, the road between Brisbane and Ipswich was considered by the incoming Governor of Queensland to be the only good road in Queensland and is still a major thoroughfare. At this time, quite a number of Europeans lived around the junction of the five tracks that were to become the Woolloongabba Fiveways, though it was not then thought of as a residential area. In June 1864 William Qualtrough purchased Lots 72 and 73 of Sub 167 on the Ipswich Road. He died in 1870 and left the land to his widow, Elizabeth.

In the 1880s Woolloongabba developed quickly, together with the adjoining suburbs of East Brisbane, Buranda and Stones Corner, following the expansion of the railway and tramway systems and the growth of associated commerce and light industry. In 1881 a dry dock was established at South Brisbane and the nearby coal wharves were linked to a railway goods yard at Woolloongabba in 1884. The first (horse drawn) trams in Brisbane ran between Woolloongabba and Newstead in 1885 and had reached Buranda by 1887.

In 1885 Robert Heaslop purchased the Ipswich Road land from Mrs Qualtrough. He appears to have been a member of a family that had retail interests in the area.

South Brisbane and Woolloongabba were amalgamated to form the City of South Brisbane in 1888 and in the following year the first Post Office opened in Woolloongabba and was serviced by tram. The area was booming, as was the Queensland economy generally, and Robert Heaslop chose this year to build a substantial hotel on his land, registering a mortgage on the title for £3,500 in November 1889. The expansion of the population in the area is reflected in the building of other hotels at the time, such as the Woolloongabba Hotel (1887), the Railway Hotel (1889) and Burke's Hotel (1890). Heaslop's new hotel was built by F Steffans and designed by John Beauchamp Nicholson.

John Beauchamp Nicholson was born in 1852 in Surry and arrived in Brisbane around 1876. After working as a clerk and foreman for the contractor and later architect, Andrew Murphie and for plumber Hiram Wakefield, he set up an architectural office in October 1885. He worked in partnership with Constantin Mathea between 1886 and January 1887, with J Sinclair Ferguson and with Alfred R L Wright from March 1890 until going into involuntary liquidation in January 1891. During these few years, Nicholson's office designed a variety of handsome and substantial buildings including Lady Musgrave Lodge in 1891 and the 1888 Princess Theatre, Woolloongabba at Woolloongabba, though a good proportion of the work catered for the liquor trade and included a number of fine hotels and the Lion Brewery in Townsville.

The Norman Hotel opened in June 1890 with Heaslop as the first licensee. To fulfil the conditions of the 1885 Licensing Acct, the licensee had to live on the premises, so the licence was quickly transferred to Henry Marsden, previously publican of the Bowen Hotel in South Brisbane. Heaslop was able to keep an eye on the premises, however, living just across the road from the hotel. Marsden remained as licensee until 1892 when J C Hauer briefly held the licence before it was transferred to Samuel Heaslop, possibly a relative of the owner. In December 1896 the hotel was leased to Percy Hubbard at 5.10.0 per week. The lease was transferred to John Dwyer in July 1897, though the licence continued in Hubbard's name until 1898. John, then Mary Dwyer, held the licence until 1900, when the brewing company of Perkins & Co purchased the hotel.

Perkins & Co was one of two breweries, established by Irish families, who had first set up business in Castlemaine, Victoria. Perkins and the Castlemaine Brewery had established breweries in Brisbane and competed for trade. Both undertook the purchase of hotels as "tied houses" selling only their own beer as part of this competition, Perkins purchasing Burke's Hotel in 1901 and Castlemaine the nearby Broadway Hotel in 1917. Perkins & Co leased the Norman Hotel to a series of publicans and in 1928 the Castlemaine Brewery and Quinlan Gray and Company purchased Perkins & Co. Ltd.

From 1900 the Woolloongabba area experienced a slow decline and the hotel, though changing licensees, remained much the same. Edward Patrick (Ted) Kearney was a licensee until his death on 1 January 1966, after which his widow Elizabeth Josephine (Josey) Kearney (née Duhig) continued to run the hotel for about 20 years. The main bar was renovated during this time though little other change occurred until the late 20th century. Mrs Kearney subsequently sold the hotel to the Mayes family who operated the business until Peter Cavill purchased the licence in 1987. He opened a steakhouse and beer garden seating 200 in 1988 and later purchased adjoining land and extended the beer garden and outdoor eating area to accommodate 700 seats. In the process of the redevelopment, several detached structures were removed from the rear of the property including stables and an air raid shelter.

The hotel has been renovated and some walls have been removed on the upper floor to create two function rooms. On the ground floor the entrance hall area has been little changed, but the dining room, kitchen, pantry and spirit room have been removed and the space is now used as a gaming area. The main bar on the other side of the hall has been reduced in size and now opens on to the courtyard area through glass folding doors

Peter Cavill sold the hotel to Lasseters Hotel Group in 2006. In 2008 it was sold to the Independent Pub Group.

In 2009 a fire broke out, closing the hotel for a month for restoration.

In April 2015 IPG sold the hotel to the Power Group of Companies, a private family business based in Brisbane.

== Description ==
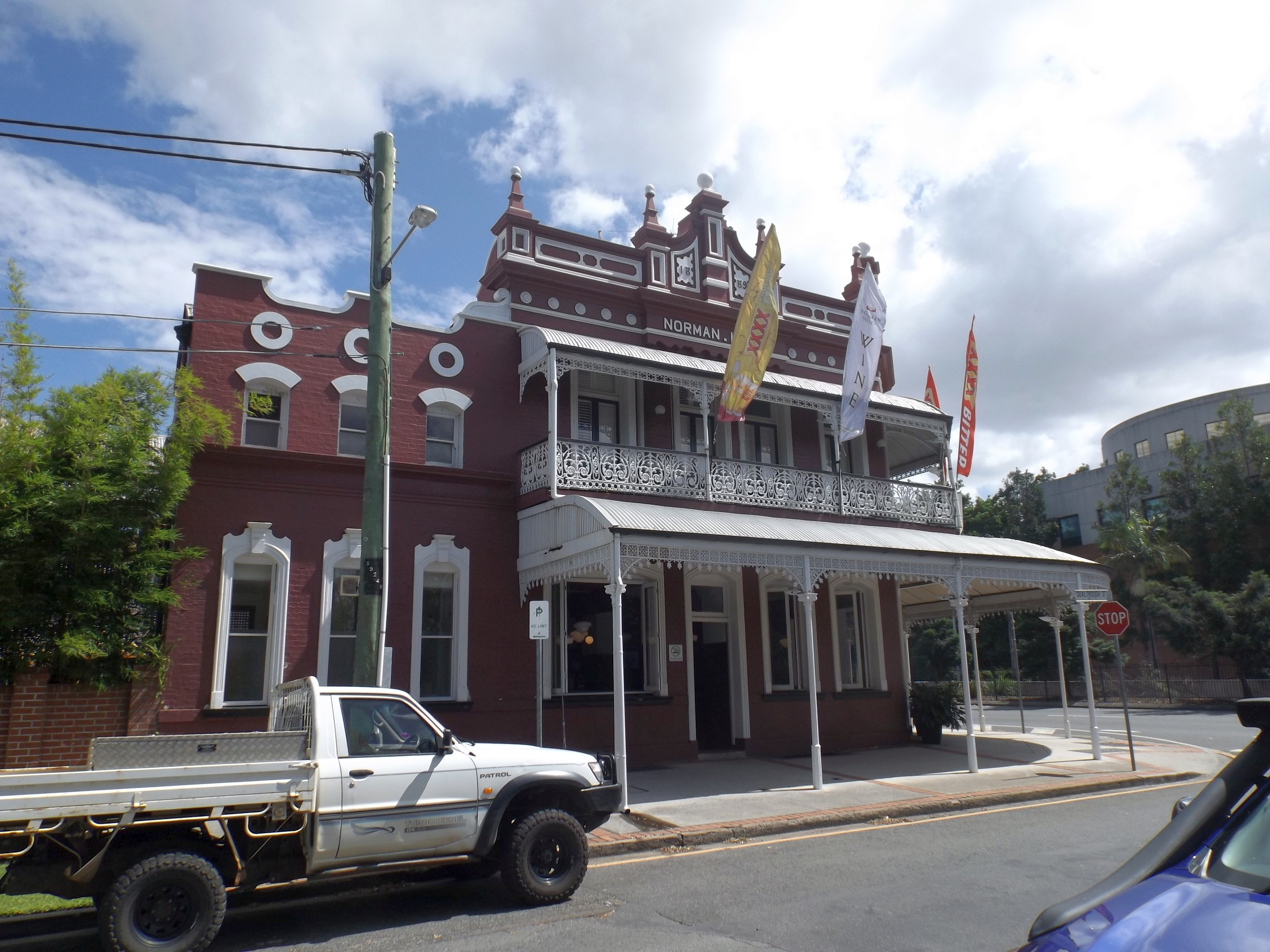
View from Qualtrough Street, 2015

The Norman Hotel is a two-storey brick hotel prominently located on the corner of Ipswich Road and Qualtrough Street, Woolloongabba.

The hotel addresses both street frontages and has a main entrance on the Ipswich Road and a corner entrance to the public bar. It is confident and flamboyant in style with an ornate parapet concealing a hipped roof, which is clad in corrugated iron and pierced by tall brick chimneys. The ground floor awning and the verandah to the upper floor feature curved corrugated iron roofs supported on slender cast iron columns. Each is truncated at the corner following the line of the building and each is decorated with lacy cast iron valances. The upper level also has cast iron balustrading.

The wing to the rear of the main section along Qualtrough Street is much simpler in form and has sash windows with moulded decoration. The upper level of the hotel has French windows opening onto the verandah. The ground floor has narrow casement windows and a recessed entrance to Ipswich Road approached through a twin arches with a central pillar and matching pilasters to each side.

Inside, the hotel retains a brick cellar space with a ceiling supported by low brick arches and a concrete floor. This is still in use for beer storage.

The Ipswich Road entrance and hall remain, with the public bar on one side of the hall and the gaming area opening off from the other. Upstairs there are conference rooms, toilets and small service rooms. Doors and joinery details generally remain intact.

The kitchen, beer garden and open air eating area to the rear of the site are modern, as is a brick liquor barn, but these are not within the listing boundary.

== Heritage listing ==
Norman Hotel was listed on the Queensland Heritage Register on 12 July 2005 having satisfied the following criteria.

The place is important in demonstrating the evolution or pattern of Queensland's history.

The Norman Hotel is important in providing evidence of the development of Queensland in the 1880s, a boom period when many fine commercial buildings were constructed, particularly in Brisbane. It is also important is demonstrating the development of the Woolloongabba and East Brisbane area in response to the growth of the tramway system. It demonstrates the importance of the Ipswich-Brisbane Road as a major transport route in the 19th century.

The place is important in demonstrating the principal characteristics of a particular class of cultural places.

The Norman Hotel is important as an example of a quality hotel of its era and demonstrates the principal characteristics of such a building, being prominently placed on a landmark corner site and designed both to attract attention and suggest the quality of service and accommodation on offer. It remains substantially intact and has well-preserved exterior detail. It has had continuity of usage as a hotel for well over a hundred years

The place is important because of its aesthetic significance.

The Norman Hotel is a local landmark, being prominently sited on a major road linking Brisbane and Ipswich. It is a well-composed building of architectural merit and makes an important contribution to the character of the area by employing strong architectural features, including an elaborate parapet and well-detailed verandahs.
