= Carina Rugby League Football Club =

Australian rugby league

Carina Tigers Rugby League Football Club
Club information
- Full name: Carina District Rugby League Football Club
- Colours: Orange; Black
- Founded: 1958
- Website: Official website

Current details
- Ground: Leo Williams Oval
- Competition: Brisbane Rugby League
- Premierships (3rd grade): 0
- Runners-up (3rd grade): 1 (2025)

The Carina Rugby League Football Club, commonly known as the Carina Tigers, was formed at the St Pauls Convent in 1958.

Carina Tigers competes in the Brisbane Rugby League and the Brisbane Second Division Rugby League with the club playing out of Leo Williams Oval, Creek Road in Carina, Queensland.
