= Wayne Stewart (rugby league) =

Australian rugby league player

Personal information
- Born: 2 June 1951 (age 75)

Playing information
- Position: Wing / Fullback
Club
Years	Team	Pld	T	G	FG	P
1969–77	Wests (Brisbane)
Representative
Years	Team	Pld	T	G	FG	P
1970–75	Queensland	11	3	37	0	83
1972	Australia	1	0	5	0	10

Wayne Stewart (born 2 June 1951) is an Australian former rugby league player.

An ex-Marist College Ashgrove pupil, Stewart was a winger and occasional fullback, often utilised as a goal-kicker during his first-grade career with Wests, where he won back to back premierships in 1975 and 1976.

Stewart was a Queensland interstate representative player in the early 1970s and made one Test match appearance for Australia, kicking five goals in a win over New Zealand at Lang Park in 1972.

Retiring as Wests top all-time points-scorer, Stewart was named on the wing in the club's Team of Century in 2015.
