= Normanby Hotel =

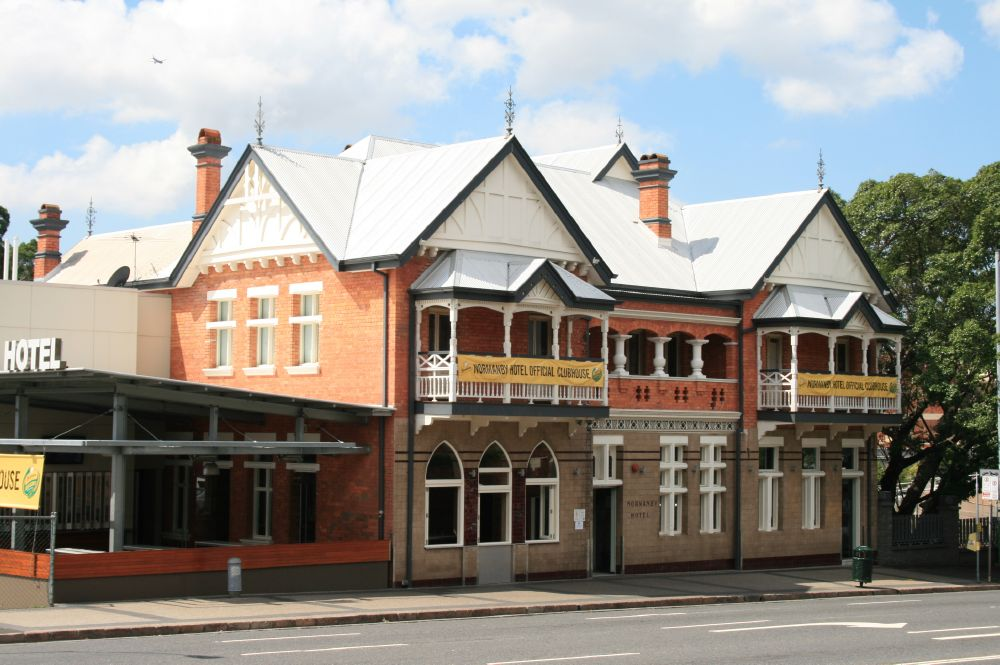
- Normanby Hotel, 2008

- Location within Queensland Location within Australia
- 27.4592°S 153.0143°E
- Location: 1 Musgrave Road, Red Hill, City of Brisbane, Queensland, Australia

History
- Design period: 1870s–1890s (late 19th century)
- Built: 1890, 1917

Site notes
- Architect(s): John B Nicholson, George Henry Male Addison
- Architectural style: Eclectic

Queensland Heritage Register
- Official name: Normanby Hotel
- Type: state heritage (built)
- Designated: 21 October 1992
- Reference no.: 600283
- Significant period: 1890–1920s (fabric); 1890–ongoing (historical – use as hotel)
- Significant components: bottle shop/drive-thru, trees/plantings
- Builders: Thomas Game

Normanby Hotel is a heritage-listed hotel at 1 Musgrave Road, Red Hill, City of Brisbane, Queensland, Australia. It was designed by John B Nicholson and built in by Thomas Game. It was extended in 1917 to a design by George Henry Male Addison. It was added to the Queensland Heritage Register on 21 October 1992.

== History ==
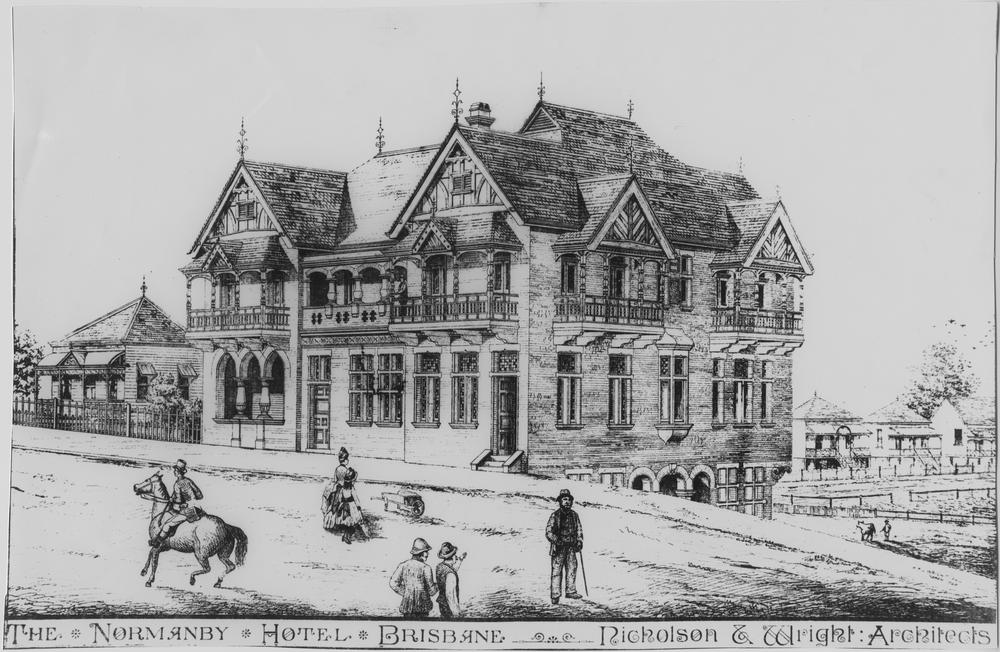
Architectural drawing of the Normanby Hotel, circa 1890

This two-storeyed brick hotel was constructed in 1890 for Brisbane publican Elizabeth Sophia Burton, on land acquired by her husband in 1865.

In 1872 the Burtons erected the first Normanby Hotel on the site, a modest two-storeyed building which fronted Kelvin Grove Road. It is likely that the hotel was named after the recently appointed Queensland Governor George Phipps, 2nd Marquess of Normanby. In 1889, the licensee William Valentine (son-in-law of the Burtons) decided to demolish the hotel to make way for the newer larger hotel facing Musgrave Road.

Architect John Beauchamp Nicholson called tenders for the new Normanby Hotel in late 1889. The successful contractor was Thomas Game with a price of £4,100, including fittings. The new hotel was formally opened on Monday 1 December 1890 with a dinner for fifty men, most of them prominent citizens including James Drake and John Annear (both Members of the Queensland Legislative Assembly).

Alterations were made in 1917, to plans prepared by architect George Henry Male Addison.

The Burton family owned the hotel until 1944, and were both licensees and occupants for much of that time.

The Normanby Hotel has become a Brisbane landmark, and lends its name to the adjacent Normanby Fiveways, the intersection of five inner city arterial roads.

== Description ==
The substantial, Queen Anne styled brick hotel stands in a prominent location on the northern ridge above Petrie Terrace, and dominates the vista at the Normanby Fiveways. It occupies a corner site and is two-storeyed to Musgrave Road and three to Kelvin Grove Road at the rear, where the land drops steeply.

The building consists of a central rectangular block with two wings at the rear and projecting bays at the front. The whole is capped by an elaborately gabled roof of corrugated iron, with Tudor style timber detailing in the gable ends, cast-iron finials above, and decorative brick chimneys.

The principal facades to the southwest and southeast are richly ornamented with cantilevered balconies beneath the gables, arcaded verandahs, and an oriel window which once overlooked the city. The Musgrave Road facade has been altered at street level, but the upper level remains intact.

At the rear are two additions: an interwar single-storeyed masonry extension, and an unsympathetic modern brick bottle shop.

Established shade trees to the southeast now obscure the city facade, and a terraced beer garden has been created beneath them.

Internally the ground floor has been remodelled, but the upper floor remains substantially intact.

Despite the alterations and painting of the face brickwork, the Normanby Hotel retains its picturesque quality.

== Heritage listing ==
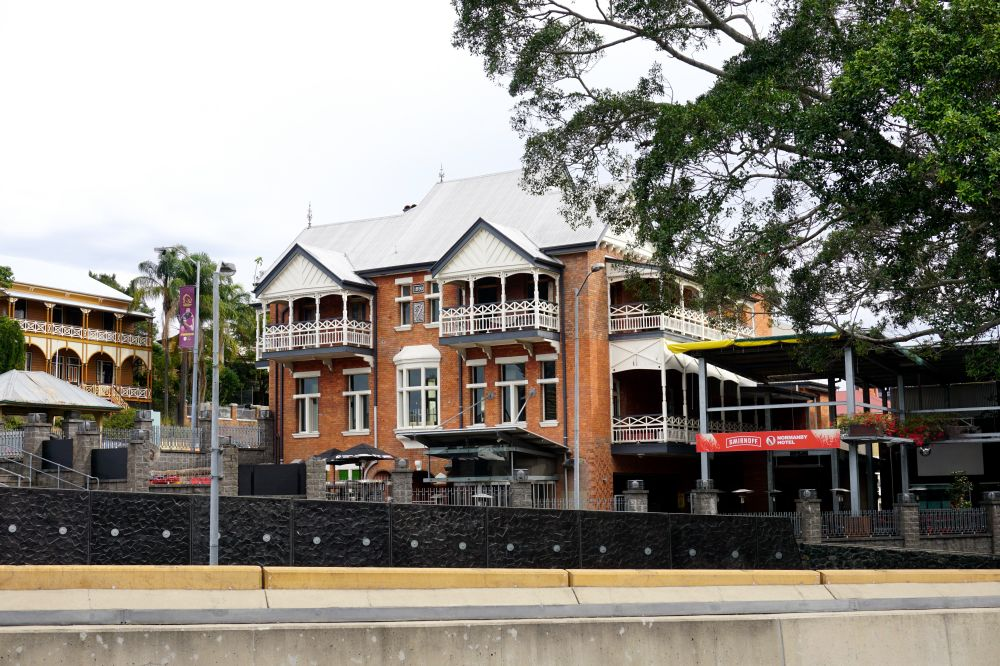
Normanby Hotel, 2016

Normanby Hotel was listed on the Queensland Heritage Register on 21 October 1992 having satisfied the following criteria.

The place is important in demonstrating the evolution or pattern of Queensland's history.

The Normanby Hotel at Red Hill, constructed in 1890 as the second Normanby Hotel on the site, is important in demonstrating the evolution of Petrie Terrace/Musgrave Road as a major arterial road in Brisbane's inner northwestern suburbs

The place demonstrates rare, uncommon or endangered aspects of Queensland's cultural heritage.

It demonstrates an early Brisbane use of Queen Anne stylistic elements in commercial design, and, along with the Norman Hotel at Buranda, is important as one of the few known examples of the commercial work of Brisbane architect JB Nicholson. The interwar bottleshop is significant as a substantially intact and increasingly rare example of its type.

The place is important in demonstrating the principal characteristics of a particular class of cultural places.

It is a picturesque, substantially intact, late 19th century hotel, employing decorative elements calculated to be popularly pleasing, and is important in illustrating the principal characteristics of its type. It demonstrates an early Brisbane use of Queen Anne stylistic elements in commercial design, and, along with the Norman Hotel at Buranda, is important as one of the few known examples of the commercial work of Brisbane architect JB Nicholson.

The place is important because of its aesthetic significance.

It is a substantially intact late 19th century hotel, employing decorative elements calculated to be popularly pleasing, and is considered important in illustrating the principal characteristics of its type. The place has strong landmark quality, and both the 1890 main building and the interwar bottleshop, along with mature trees in the grounds, make a significant contribution to the Red Hill/Petrie Terrace townscape.

The place has a special association with the life or work of a particular person, group or organisation of importance in Queensland's history.

It demonstrates an early Brisbane use of Queen Anne stylistic elements in commercial design, and, along with the Norman Hotel at Buranda, is important as one of the few known examples of the commercial work of Brisbane architect JB Nicholson.
