= Princess Theatre (Woolloongabba) =

Historic theatre in Australia

Princess Theatre, Woolloongabba
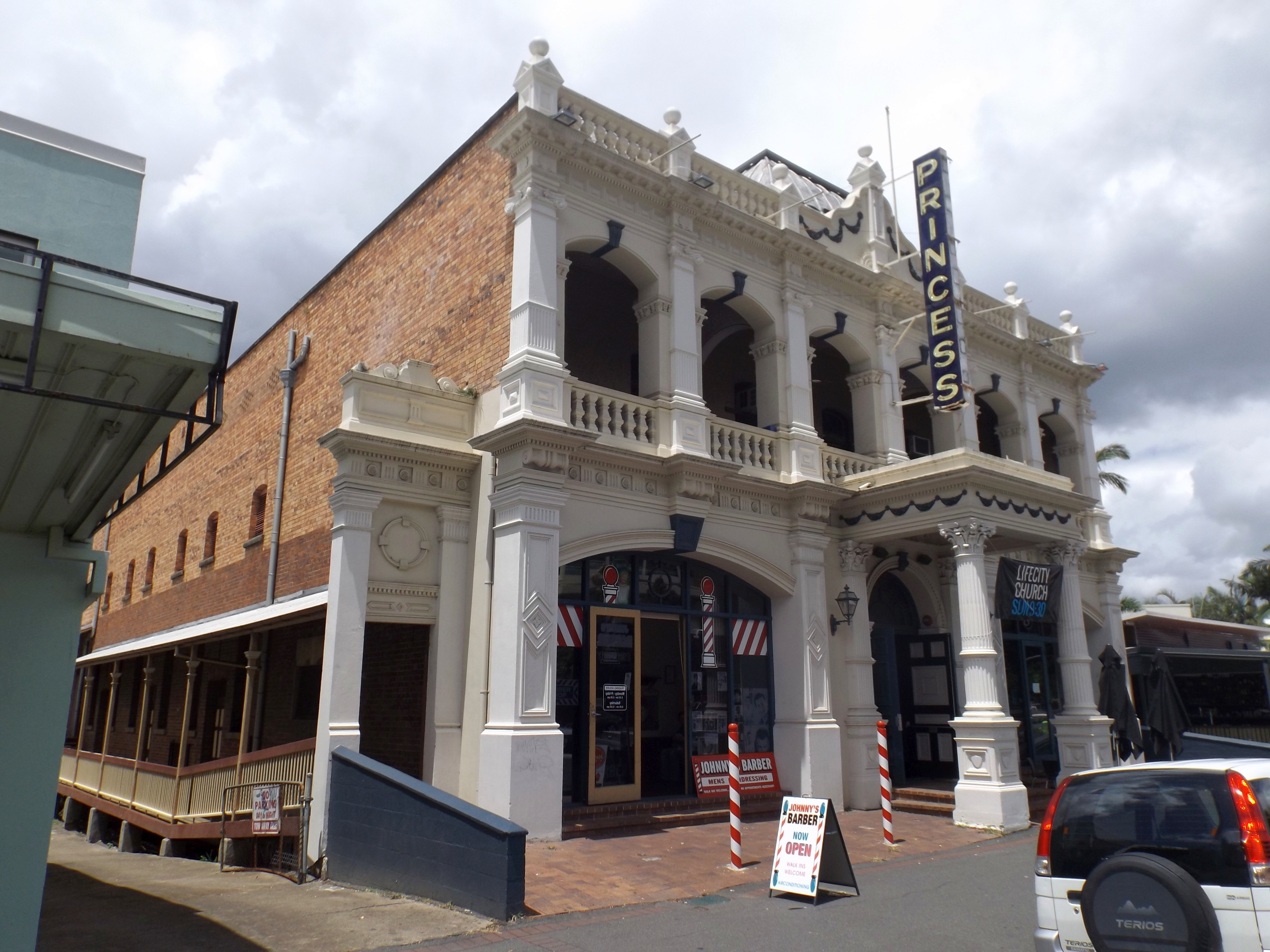
- Structure in 2015

- Location within Queensland Location within Australia
- 27.4864°S 153.0294°E
- Location: 8 Annerley Road, Woolloongabba, Queensland, Australia

History
- Design period: 1870s–1890s (late 19th century)
- Built: 1888

Site notes
- Architect: John Beauchamp Nicholson
- Architectural style: Classicism

Queensland Heritage Register
- Official name: Princess Theatre, South Brisbane Public Hall/Boggo Road Theatre
- Type: state heritage (built)
- Designated: 21 October 1992
- Reference no.: 600353
- Significant period: 1888 (fabric); 1888–1949, 1942–1945, 1985–ongoing (historical, social)
- Significant components: foyer – entrance, stage/sound shell, dress circle, foyer – dress circle, proscenium arch

Princess Theatre is a heritage-listed theatre at 8 Annerley Road, Woolloongabba, Queensland, Australia. It was designed by architect John Beauchamp Nicholson and built in 1888. It is also known as South Brisbane Public Hall and Boggo Road Theatre. It was added to the Queensland Heritage Register on 21 October 1992.

== History ==
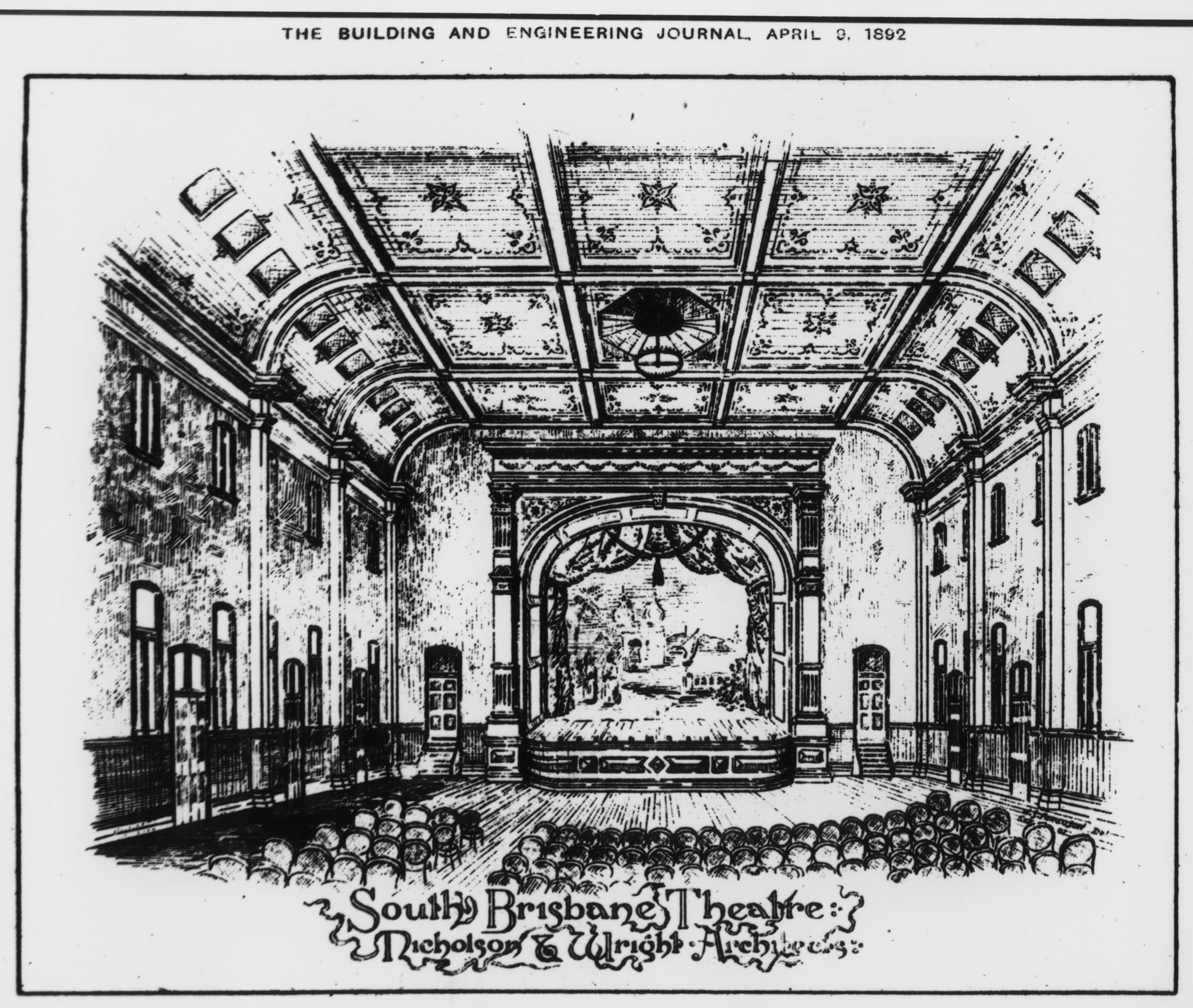
Artist's sketch of the theatre interior, circa 1892

This large brick building was constructed in 1888 for prominent Brisbane solicitor Phillip Hardgrave and the South Brisbane Public Hall Syndicate which was incorporated as a Company in 1890.

Its construction was an entrepreneurial venture responding to the needs of a rapidly expanding South Brisbane, East Brisbane, Woolloongabba, and Thompson Estate population. It provided the newly created Borough of South Brisbane with a central public hall which could be hired for public meetings, lectures, balls, theatrical and musical performances and other public functions. In 1887 Hardgrave acquired the Boggo Road (later Annerley Road) site, set up the subscription company, and commissioned Brisbane architect John Beauchamp Nicholson to design the hall. It was erected the following year by builder Blair Cunningham, for a contract price of £5,220.

In the early years, the privately funded hall was known variously as the South Brisbane Public Hall (1888–91) and the Boggo Road Theatre (1892–1904).

In 1893, the title to the property was transferred from Hardgrave to his father, John Hardgrave, a former mayor of Brisbane who was also the major investor in the Boggo Road Theatre Company. The building was used during the 1890s for sporadic productions of live performances, vaudeville and as a skating rink, but did not emerge as a major theatrical venue in Brisbane. The South Brisbane Hall Company was voluntarily wound up in 1895.

From 1894, the Salvation Army began using the theatre and they took out a lease in 1896.

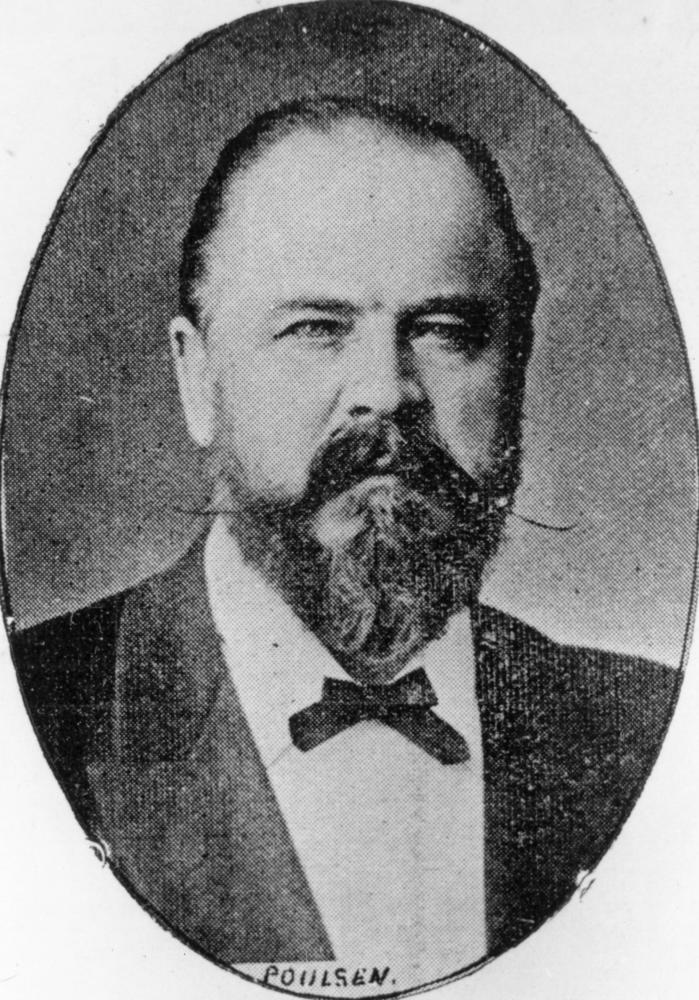
Thomas Finney of Finney, Isles and Co

Brisbane draper Thomas Finney acquired the property in 1899 and used the theatre as a clothing factory, although the stage was still hired for occasional performances. In 1902, he rented the building to a retail drapery company known as the DIA or Direct Importing Association. From 1907, it was leased by businessman John Burke Dent who established a clothing factory there. In 1909, there was a major fire which damaged the walls and ceiling of the theatre.

Thomas Finney died in 1903 and the property eventually transferred to Finney Isles and Company who sold it to John Dent in 1912. Dent leased space to Thomas Hall for a clothing workshop, which was in operation in a separate building behind the theatre from 1912 until 1938. West's Pictures leased the theatre which they renamed The Princess. In 1914, the theatre was purchased by Brisbane solicitor Herbert Brealy Hemming who retained ownership until his death in 1942. West's operated the theatre until 1925 but it continued after then as a movie-house.

In the 1930s Brisbane's fledgling amateur theatre companies - Brisbane Repertory Theatre (now La Boite Theatre Company), Brisbane Arts Theatre and the Twelfth Night Theatre Company (later TN! Theatre Co.) - all performed at the Princess.

From 1942 to 1945 the theatre served as the administrative and rehearsal centre for the United States Entertainment Unit. In the years immediately following World War II, it was hired to a variety of community groups such as ballet schools, college revues, and scout troops.

From 1949 to 1985 the building lost all association with the performing arts, and was rented to various small businesses, including a paper wholesaler, an engineering firm, a rag merchant, a second hand dealer and a used appliance retailer. The stage area was leased separately to a printing firm for over thirty years from 1948 to 1979.

In 1985 the property was acquired by REMM Group Ltd, who carried out external restoration, and offered TN! Theatre Company a ten-year lease from 1986. Internal restoration and refitting was carried out by TN!. Due to financial difficulties, TN!'s last production was in 1991.

From 2001, the theatre was leased by the Metro Central Community Church (now the LifeCity Church) and purchased by them in 2003. The church used the theatre for its church services and other events and also offered it for hire to others for use as a theatre and a venue for weddings and other events.

In 2020, the Church decided to move to more suitable premises and put the Princess up for sale. It was sold that year to new owners, businessman Steve Wilson and The Tivoli owners Steve Sleswick and Dave Sleswick, who refurbished the theatre as a venue for live music and the arts. The first concert in the refurbished auditorium was held in August 2021 ahead of the venue's official opening in October 2021.

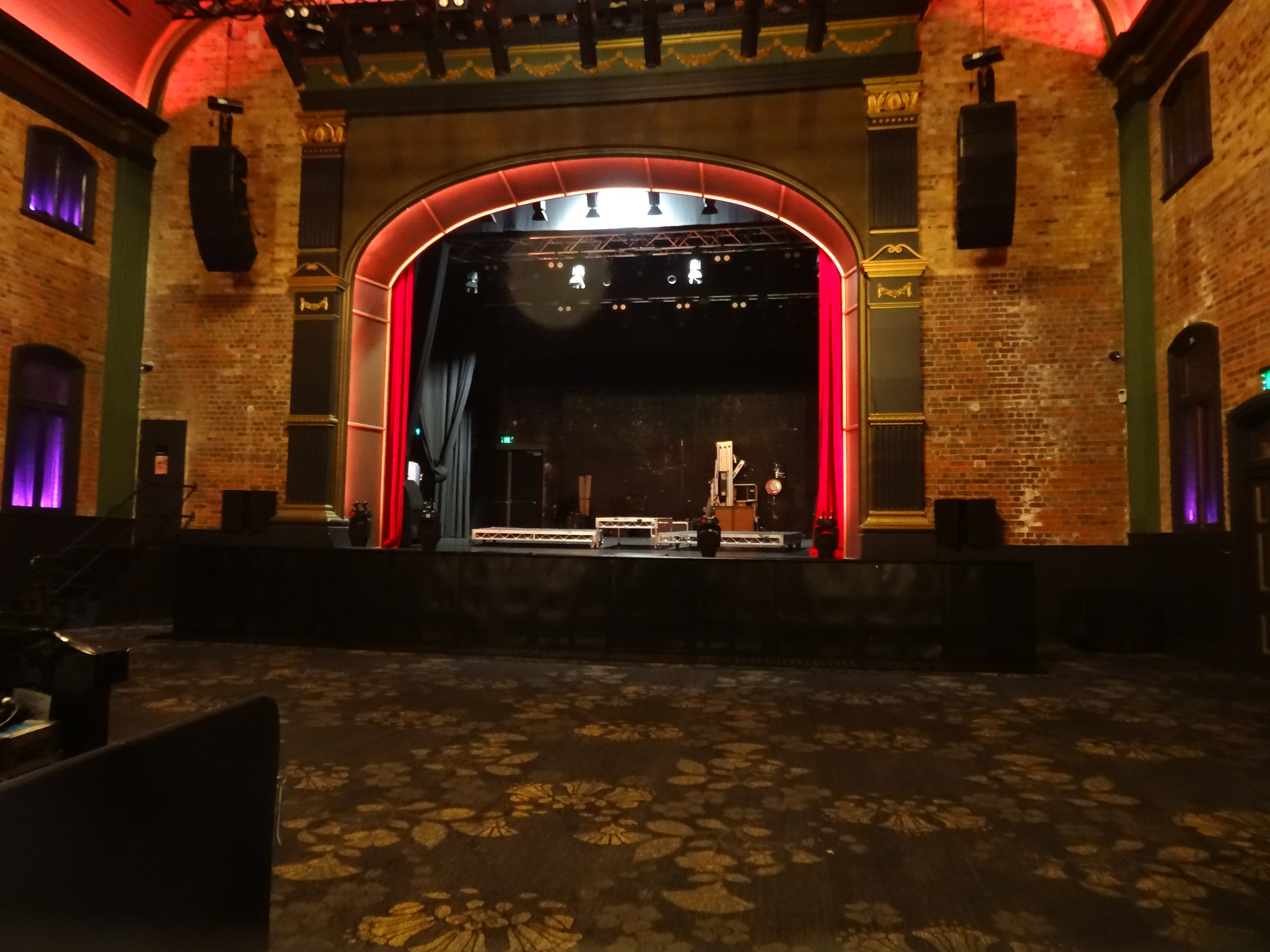
Ground interior, 2023

== Description ==
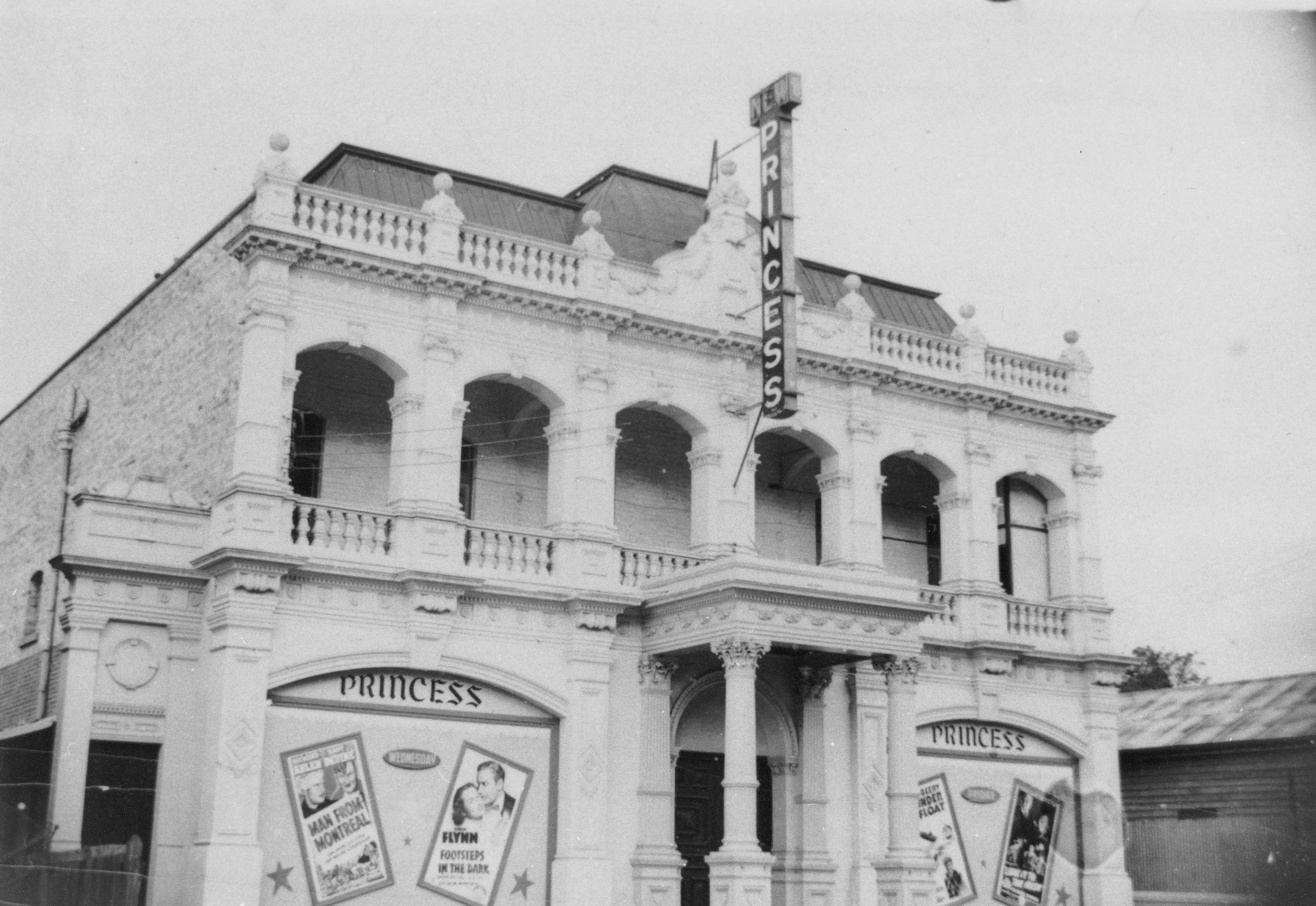
Princess Theatre, circa 1941

The Princess Theatre is a two-storey rectangular brick building fronting Annerley Road to the west, with narrow laneways to either side and rear. The building has three roof sections, the front having a mansard roof and the auditorium and backstage having hipped corrugated iron roofs with central raised sections for ventilation.

The symmetrical, rendered west elevation displays a highly decorative classical influence in its design. The central entrance portico has two corner columns, on square bases, with an entablature with a laurel frieze in relief. The entrance has double timber doors and arched fanlight with coloured glass panels.

The ground floor has a shopfront to either side of the entrance, with a glazed wide arched opening framed by pilasters and entablature. The first floor has a verandah with rendered balustrade, columns, entablature and arched spandrel panels with decorative keystones. This elevation has a rooftop balustrade, between column tops surmounted by spheres, with a central curved pediment with laurels in relief. The mansard roof rises behind.

The other three elevations are of face brick, having darker brick to the ground floor, with a parapet wall. The building has timber walkways along the north and south elevations with double timber doors and casement windows with fanlights opening from the auditorium.

The foyer has a sloping floor to the auditorium entrance, and a central timber stair to the gallery level and first floor offices. The wall surfaces have been rendered and scribed to imitate stone blocks and a new ceiling with downlights has been installed. A door opens to the shops on either side. The landing level has carved timber balusters which pre-date the existing stair and balustrade.

The auditorium is entered under the gallery, or dress circle. The landing above is supported by two cast iron columns and the sloping gallery by four timber posts. The underside of the gallery has pressed metal sheeting. A kitchen/bar has been installed in this area which is separated from the auditorium by an open stud wall.

The auditorium has face brick walls with rendered pilasters and cornice, and timber architraves, dado and panelling below. The ceiling is curved at the corners with boarded panels running lengthwise, widthwise and diagonally. The central area has two roses on cast iron grating for ventilation. The proscenium arch has rendered pilasters and entablature with a laurel frieze.

The backstage area is painted black. A high level walkway runs around the perimeter and a stair in the southeast corner leads to the basement. The basement has a concrete floor and contains a central storage/performance space with dressing rooms to the north and an office area to the south, all with external access.

The first floor contains offices open onto the west verandah. Toilets behind open off the top of the stair. The gallery is accessed from the landing and contains six rows of tiered seating.

== Heritage listing ==
Princess Theatre was listed on the Queensland Heritage Register on 21 October 1992 having satisfied the following criteria.

The place is important in demonstrating the evolution or pattern of Queensland's history.

The Princess Theatre is important in demonstrating the evolution of Woolloongabba/South Brisbane as a major urban centre in Brisbane in the 1880s.

The place demonstrates rare, uncommon or endangered aspects of Queensland's cultural heritage.

It is particularly significant as the only intact surviving 19th century theatre in Brisbane, demonstrating an aspect of Brisbane's cultural heritage which is now rare, and is important in demonstrating the principal characteristics of a substantial 19th century masonry theatre.

The place is important in demonstrating the principal characteristics of a particular class of cultural places.

It is particularly significant as the only intact surviving 19th century theatre in Brisbane, demonstrating an aspect of Brisbane's cultural heritage which is now rare, and is important in demonstrating the principal characteristics of a substantial 19th century masonry theatre.

The place is important because of its aesthetic significance.

The Princess Theatre is important in exhibiting a range of aesthetic characteristics valued by the Brisbane community, local residents and those interested in theatre design, in particular: the ornately decorated street facade and more restrained interior; and the building's contribution to the Clarence Corner streetscape and Woolloongabba townscape.

The place has a strong or special association with a particular community or cultural group for social, cultural or spiritual reasons.

The Princess Theatre has a strong and extensive association with Brisbane theatre, both amateur and professional and has a special association with Brisbane architect John Beachamp Nicholson as an example of his commercial work.

The place has a special association with the life or work of a particular person, group or organisation of importance in Queensland's history.

The Princess Theatre has a strong and extensive association with Brisbane theatre, both amateur and professional and has a special association with Brisbane architect John Beauchamp Nicholson as an example of his commercial work.
