= Wests Panthers =

Australian rugby league club

Club information
- Full name: Wests Panthers Rugby League Football Club
- Nickname(s): The Panthers; Wests; The Mud & Bloods
- Colours: Red and black
- Founded: 1915; 111 years ago (as Wests)

Current details
- Ground: Purtell Park Bardon, Queensland (18,000)
- CEO: Tony Currie
- Coach: Craig Ingebritsen (2014)
- Captain: Shannon Fish
- Competition: Queensland Cup; Mixwell Cup; Brisbane Rugby League; Winfield State League; FOGS Colts Challenge; FOGS Cup
- 2014: 11th
- Home colours
- Current season

Records
- Premierships: 12 (1916, 1920, 1922, 1932, 1936, 1948, 1952, 1954, 1975, 1976, 1992, 1993)
- Runners-up: 9 (1915, 1927, 1933, 1934, 1937, 1950, 1956, 1991, 1994)
- Minor premierships: 13 (1916, 1920, 1922, 1932, 1933, 1934, 1948, 1950, 1952, 1958, 1972, 1975, 1993)
- Wooden spoons: 13 (1918, 1923, 1929, 1942, 1943, 1946, 1947, 1974, 1980, 1982, 1983, 1985, 1986)
- Premierships (2nd grade): 0
- Runners-up (2nd grade): 1 (1998)
- Wooden spoons (2nd grade): 1 (2003)
- Premierships (3rd grade): 2 (2009, 2022)
- Runners-up (3rd grade): 4 (2020, 2021, 2024, 2026)

The Western Suburbs Panthers, or the West Brisbane Panthers, or often simply referred to as Wests for short, is a semi professional rugby league club based in the western suburbs of Brisbane, Queensland, Australia. The club is the oldest in the QRL and despite absences from the top grade in recent years and several name changes the club continued to operate. After leaving the Queensland Cup, they participated in the Brisbane A-Grade competition from 2005 until their senior sides disbanding in 2012. In 2013, the club entered a voluntary hiatus, but was announced to be part of the revived Brisbane Rugby League.

== History ==
The club's roots trace back to the first game of rugby league played in the state - a game between North Brisbane and Toombul in 1909. By 1914, a club from Toowong had also entered the Brisbane junior competition, and by 1915 it had merged with North Brisbane senior club, forming the Western Suburbs District Rugby League Football Club.

After winning their first premiership in 1916, they became the first major club in Queensland to go through the season undefeated in 1920, something they would do again in 1922, winning the first premiership conducted by the newly formed Brisbane Rugby League. In 1927 one of the club's best known players, Tom Purtell, began 56-year association with the club. Purtell was a hooker for Wests until 1941, and was involved with the club at management level until 1969, including a 20-year unchallenged stint as president.

Although they won a total of 12 premierships, their most successful period was the 1990s. Even though the Brisbane Broncos had a major effect on the standard of play and the popularity of the local club competition, Wests were runners-up in 1991, and Premiership winners in 1992 and 1993, before again being runners up in 1994. They were a founding member of the Queensland Cup in 1996, and were runners-up to Norths in 1998. However, after the turn of the century Wests were struggling financially, and following a disastrous year in 2003 when the club lost all 22 games of the season, including a club record 78–0 loss to Norths at Bishop Park, the club decided to depart the Qld Cup competition, deciding to instead guarantee their survival by participating in lower grades only, and planning to re-enter the Qld Cup competition at a later date.

In 2005 Wests made the Colts (U/19) grand final, although after leading at half-time they were eventually defeated by Norths. At seasons' end the Broncos, who had had a feeder club arrangement in place with Wests for the previous few years, pulled out and linked with the Aspley Devils. At the same time Wests merged their teams with Hills District who had been playing out of the Arana Hills club, to form the Western Districts Panthers for 2006 onwards. In 2008 the Colts team then won the Fogs Challenge under the astute coaching of Craig Ingebrigtsen defeating Aspley 30–16 in the Grand Final after having won that year's minor premiership, the club's first premiership as a new entity.

In 2009 the meteoric rise of the club back to the big time continued with a memorable 30–24 win over arch rivals Redcliffe in the Fogs Cup (reserve grade) Grand Final. Played at Stockland Park, Kawana the Panthers proved to tough for the Dolphins overcoming a 24–22 deficit to claim the title. Adam Breen had a memorable day scoring 3 tries, to add to his 20 during the regular season and the leading try scorer title. The win continued the golden run of coach Craig Ingebrigtsen, who last year coached the Fogs Colts grand final winning team.

In 2010 former club great Tony Currie took over as club president in a bid to return Wests to the glory days in the statewide competition. As part of the restructure, the club planned to be based out of its spiritual home Purtell Park, which had undergone somewhat of an upgrade. However, after three seasons, Currie notified Queensland Rugby League that the club will be going on hiatus beginning in 2013.

== Affiliation ==
On 26 September 2014, the team was announced to be revived as part of the new Brisbane Rugby League, set to commence in 2015, and replace the FOGS Cup. In the new BRL, clubs were started (in some cases revived) by existing QRL teams, and West Brisbane Panthers commenced as a development side for Norths Devils. They currently play out of Frank Lind Oval (home of junior side Wests Mitchelton) and various grounds affiliated with Norths.

== Crest ==
An older club logo

Traditionally Wests are referred to simply as "Suburbs". Other press-driven nicknames included the 'Mud and Bloods' due to the design of their jersey, however the use of this nickname has become rarer since the introduction of the Panther logo at their annual meeting in December 1967. In the early 1980s a rebranding move by the Queensland Rugby League saw all BRL clubs adopt a logo with a stylised Q, similar to the QRL logo used at the time.

== Colours ==
Wests' traditional jersey

When the Toowong and North Brisbane merged to form Wests in 1915, the club's colours were to be red and navy blue hoops with black shorts, a combination of Toowong's blue and black and North Brisbane's red and black. However, due to a shortage of blue dye during World War I, red and black were adopted as the official colours. Wests constitutional design includes 4 in (100 mm) red and black bands, commencing with black on the shoulders. Sleeves then also commenced with the first band being black, with the hooped socks having red tops. During the Second World War, Wests adopted a maroon jersey with a black V, due to clothing shortages at the time.

== Home grounds ==
Wests' first home ground was the Botanical Gardens, but played at Lang Park between 1955 and 1973. In 1974, the club moved wholly to its training premises on Mount Coot-tha, naming their new home Purtell Park after club stalwart Tom Purtell. Purtell Park had the abnormality of being on a slope, with the southern end being higher, although this is not noticeable on television. Since their merger with Hills District, they have been playing out of the Kev McKell Oval at Arana Hills.

== Junior clubs ==
The Wests senior club, along with particular individuals such as Hugh Kelly, Tom Purtell, and Jim Orr etc., were instrumental in establishing numerous junior clubs in the north-western district of Brisbane. Wests Junior RLFC was the first, when Ithaca Creek State School boys and the Police club boys players merged during the early 1950s. Based at Gilbert Park, Wests juniors were one of the strongest junior rugby league bases in the Brisbane, until the Brisbane Broncos took over the facilities completely for training purposes, and forced them out. Wests juniors then took up tenancy on the number two field at the senior club's Purtell Park facility. Other Wests junior clubs to form have included Wests Arana Hills, Wests Mitchelton, Wests Centenary, Wests Kenmore and Wests Inala - all of whom have enjoyed substantial success on-field, and produced quality players who have gone on to wear the red and black of the Panthers.

== Notable players ==
- Cecil Aynsley (Queensland and Australian Winger of the 1920s and Queensland Rugby League's Team of the Century member)
- Norm Carr (Queensland lock forward, fresh reserve for Queensland's inaugural Origin team in 1980)
- Tony Currie (Canterbury-Bankstown, Brisbane Broncos, Queensland and Australian utility back)
- Nathan Daly (Leinster Rugby, London Irish, Centre)
- Ken Day (Australia and Queensland representative forward)
- Nick Frisby (Queensland Reds and Australian Wallabies scrum-half)
- Michael Hagan (Canterbury-Bankstown, Newcastle Knights, Halifax, Queensland half. Only played 3 Reserve Grade games for Wests in 1982, but this made him eligible for Queensland Origin)
- Duncan Hall (great Queensland and Australian Front Row forward of the 1950s, Australian Rugby League's Team of the Century, National Rugby League Hall of Fame Member)
- Bryce Hegarty (Rugby Union fullback for the Melbourne Rebels, NSW Waratahs, Queensland Reds and Western Force)
- Sebastian Kris (Canberra Raiders, New Zealand international winger)
- Nathan Lowrie (Queensland and Australian Universities second row)
- Lachlan Maranta (Brisbane Broncos and St George Illawarra Dragons wing/fullback. Also played rugby for the Queensland Reds)
- Barry Muir (Queensland and Australian halfback, the first person to call the New South Wales rugby league team "cockroaches")
- Greg Oliphant (Balmain, Queensland and later Australian halfback. Queensland Origin's inaugural halfback in 1980)
- Warren Orr (Queensland and Australian winger)
- Nathaniel Peteru (Gold Coast Titans, Leeds Rhinos, Hull Kingston Rovers, Leigh Centurians and Huddersfield Giants forward)
- John Ribot (Newtown, Western Suburbs Magpies, Manly-Warringah Sea Eagles, Queensland and Australian winger/lock, founding CEO of Brisbane Broncos, CEO of Super League, Founding Chairman of Melbourne Storm, Queensland Roar CEO, Queensland Rugby League board member)
- Geoff Richardson (Queensland and Australian five-eighth and former Wallaby)
- John Sattler (legendary South Sydney Rabbitohs, New South Wales, Queensland and Australian forward who played two seasons for the Panthers at the end of his career)
- Korbin Sims (Newcastle Knights, St George Illawarra and Fiji International Lock)
- Wayne Stewart (Queensland and Australian winger)
- Brad Thorn (Broncos, Queensland, Australia and New Zealand All Black)
- Ben Toolis (Edinburgh Rugby, Scotland rugby international)
- Richie Twist (Queensland second rower, Brisbane school teacher and juniors sports coach)
- Paul Vautin (Manly-Warringah 1987 Premiership captain, Eastern Suburbs (Sydney), Queensland and Australian lock/second row, TV presenter. Last Qld representative forward selected in a NSW representative team (NSW City 1984) during Origin era, Queensland Origin coach 1995–1996)
- Alex Watson, Australia and Queensland representative Centre.
- Brent Webb (New Zealand Warriors & New Zealand Winger & Fullback)

== Sources ==
- Wests Panthers Statistics retrieved 7 December 2005
- Lester, Gary. The Sun Book of Rugby League. published by Fairfax
