= South Sydney Rabbitohs =

Australian rugby league football club

Club information
- Full name: South Sydney District Rugby League Football Club Limited
- Nickname(s): Rabbitohs, Souths, Bunnies, Rabbits, The Red and Green, The Cardinal and Myrtle, The Pride of the League
- Short name: SOU
- Colours: Red; Green
- Founded: 17 January 1908; 118 years ago
- Website: rabbitohs.com.au

Current details
- Ground: Stadium Australia Sydney Football Stadium (82,000 42,500)
- CEO: Blake Solly
- Chairman: Nick Pappas
- Coach: Wayne Bennett
- Captain: Cameron Murray
- Current season

Uniforms
Home colours	Away colours

Records
- Premierships: 21 (1908, 1909, 1914, 1918, 1925, 1926, 1927, 1928, 1929, 1931, 1932, 1950, 1951, 1953, 1954, 1955, 1967, 1968, 1970, 1971, 2014)
- Runners-up: 14 (1910, 1916, 1917, 1920, 1923, 1924, 1935, 1937, 1939, 1949, 1952, 1965, 1969, 2021)
- Minor premierships: 17 (1908, 1909, 1914, 1918, 1925, 1926, 1927, 1929, 1932, 1949, 1950, 1951, 1953, 1968, 1969, 1970, 1989)
- NSW Cup: 21 (1913, 1914, 1917, 1923, 1924, 1925, 1926, 1927, 1929, 1931, 1932, 1934, 1943, 1945, 1952, 1953, 1956, 1966, 1968, 1983, 2023)
- Wooden spoons: 8 (1945, 1946, 1962, 1975, 1990, 2003, 2004, 2006)
- Most capped: 336 – John Sutton
- Highest try scorer: 236 – Alex Johnston
- Highest points scorer: 1,896 – Adam Reynolds

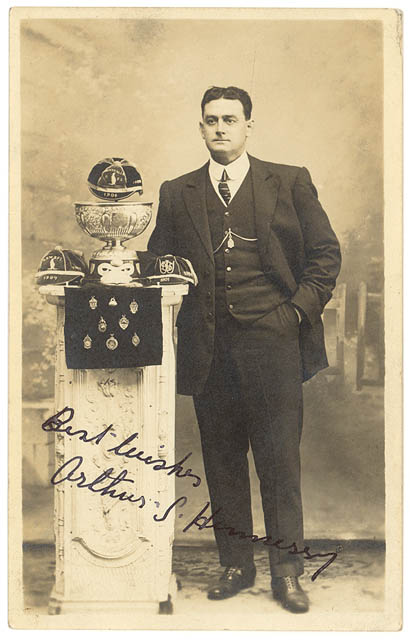
Arthur Hennessy, South Sydney's first captain and coach

The South Sydney District Rugby League Football Club, also known as the South Sydney Rabbitohs, are an Australian professional rugby league football club based in the Sydney suburb of Maroubra that competes in the National Rugby League (NRL). They are often nicknamed Souths or the Bunnies.

The club was formed in 1908, as one of the founding members of the New South Wales Rugby Football League, making it one of Australia's oldest rugby league teams. It is one of only two NSW (New South Wales) foundation clubs still present in the NRL, the other being the Sydney Roosters. (Note: In Australia, a foundation club is one that played in the first season of competition. South Sydney played in the first season of the New South Wales Rugby League premiership, some call it the predecessor to the National Rugby League competition.)

South Sydney's traditional heartland covers the once typically working-class suburbs of inner-south Sydney. The club is based in Maroubra, where its administration and training facilities are located, however it has long held a wide supporter base spread all over New South Wales. The team's home grounds are currently Stadium Australia in Sydney Olympic Park, and Sydney Football Stadium in Moore Park. South Sydney is the most successful professional team in the history of Australian rugby league with twenty-one first grade premierships.

== History ==
=== Origins ===
The South Sydney District Rugby League Football Club was formed at a meeting on 17 January 1908 at Redfern Town Hall when administrator J. J. Giltinan, cricketer Victor Trumper and politician Henry Hoyle gathered together in front of a large crowd of supporters. The club played in the first round of the newly formed New South Wales Rugby League, defeating North Sydney 11–7 at Birchgrove Oval on 20 April 1908. The team went on to win the inaugural premiership then successfully defended its title in the 1909 season, winning the Grand Final by default. During these early years Arthur Hennessy was considered the "founding father" of the South Sydney rugby league club. A hooker and prop forward, Hennessy was Souths' first captain and coach. He was also New South Wales' first captain and Australia's first test captain in 1908. S. G. "George" Ball became club secretary in 1911 after Arthur Hennessy stood down from the position, and he remained in that capacity for over 50 years, only retiring a few years before his death in 1969.

=== NSWRFL & ARL (1908–1997) ===
After further premiership success in 1914 and 1918, South Sydney won seven of the eight premierships from 1925 to 1932, missing out only in 1930. The 1925 side went through the season undefeated for 12 games. and is only one of six Australian premiership sides in history to have achieved this feat. Such was Souths' dominance in the early years of the rugby league competition that the Rabbitohs were labelled "The Pride of the League".

South Sydney struggled between 1940–1948. South Sydney's longest losing streak of 22 games was during the period 1945–1947. In the 1945 season the club only managed to win one game while in 1946 it was unable to win a single game.

==== 1950s golden era (1949–1957) ====
1949 would mark the beginning of almost a decade of great success for South Sydney, winning five of the six premierships from 1950 to 1955, and losing the 1949 Grand Final against St. George, and also the 1952 Grand Final against Western Suburbs in controversial circumstances. The 1951 side's point scoring feat in its 42–14 victory over Manly-Warringah remains the highest score by a team in a Grand Final and "the miracle of '55" involved South Sydney winning 11 straight sudden death matches to win the premiership. Players that were involved in these years included Denis Donoghue, Jack Rayner, Les "Chicka" Cowie, Johnny Graves, Ian Moir, Greg Hawick, Ernie Hammerton, Bernie Purcell and Clive Churchill. Churchill, nicknamed "the Little Master" for his brilliant attacking fullback play, is universally regarded as one of the greatest ever Australian rugby league players.

In the late 1950s Souths began a run of poor form, failing to make the finals from 1958 to 1964, during this time receiving the 1962 wooden spoon.

==== More premiership success (1965–1971) ====
In 1965 a talented young side made the Grand Final against St. George who were aiming to secure its tenth straight premiership. The young Rabbitohs were not overawed by the Dragons' formidable experience and in front of a record crowd of 78,056 at the Sydney Cricket Ground, it went down narrowly 12–8. The nucleus of this side went on to feature in Australian representative teams for the next six years and ensured another golden period for South Sydney making five successive grand finals from 1967 to 1971, winning four. Bob McCarthy, John O'Neill, Eric Simms, Ron Coote, Mike Cleary and John Sattler from 1965 were later joined by Elwyn Walters, Ray Branighan, Paul Sait, Gary Stevens and coach Clive Churchill to form a fearsome combination before internal strife and poaching by other clubs from 1972 onwards unravelled the star studded pack. From this period comes part of South's and Australian Rugby League folklore when in the 1970 premiership decider against Manly, captain John Sattler inspired the side to victory playing out 70 minutes of the match with his jaw broken in three places after being king hit by Manly prop John Bucknall.

==== Financial trouble and exclusion (1972–1999) ====
Financial problems started to hit Souths in the early 1970s, forcing some players to go to other clubs. The licensed Leagues Club, traditionally such an important revenue provider to all first grade league sides, was closed in 1973 but a "Save Our Souths" campaign ensured the club survived. "Super Coach" (Note: Reference to Jack Gibson as a "Super Coach" is common terminology in Australian rugby league circles given Gibson's outstanding coaching record – see: "Super coach Gibson salutes his favourite players". The Sydney Morning Herald. AAP. 14 August 2003.) Jack Gibson's arrival turned the club's form, winning the pre-season competition in 1978. The club captured victories in the mid-week Tooth Cup competition in 1981 and in the pre-season "Sevens" competition in 1988. The Rabbitohs made the finals on five occasions in the 1980s, including a dominant season to finish as minor premiers in 1989. The 1989 season proved to be the club's most successful in years, but was also the last time the club reached the finals until 2007. The following season the Rabbitohs finished as wooden spooners.

The club stayed afloat in the 1990s despite major financial problems. Souths' only success came in 1994 when it won the pre-season competition, defeating the Brisbane Broncos 27–26 in the final. The Super League War and the eventual formation of the National Rugby League affected the club greatly when it was determined in 1998 that the newly formed competition would be contracted to 14 teams for the 2000 season. Following a series of mergers by other teams, (Note: The St George Dragons and Illawarra Steelers merged into the St George Illawarra Dragons in 1998, the Balmain Tigers and Western Suburbs Magpies merged to form the Wests Tigers in 1999 whilst also in the same year the Manly Sea Eagles and North Sydney Bears (who were excluded from the competition on failing to meet solvency criteria) merged into the Northern Eagles (the merger was subsequently dissolved with Manly re-entering the competition in 2003).) and a planned merger with Cronulla-Sutherland that was met with staunch opposition from both clubs, South Sydney failed to meet the National Rugby League's selection criteria to compete in the competition and were subsequently excluded from the premiership at the end of the 1999 season.

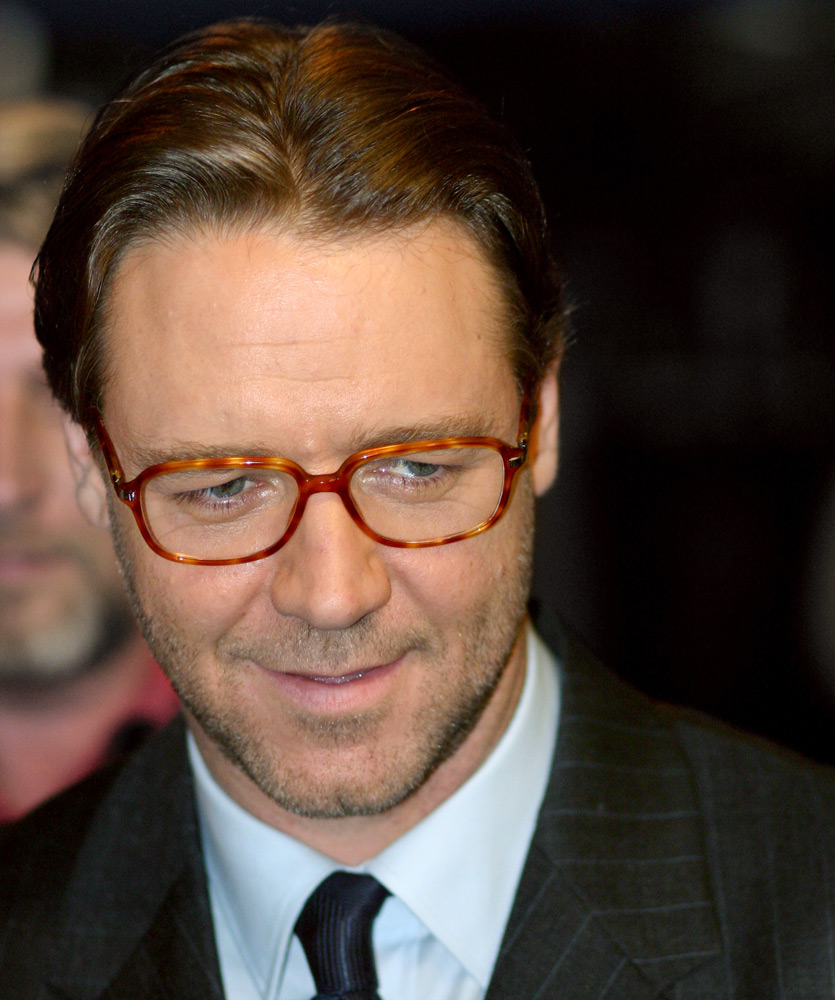
South Sydney Rabbitohs shareholder, actor Russell Crowe.

==== Fight for readmission ====
Chart of yearly table positions for South Sydney Rabbitohs in First Grade Rugby League.

In 2000 and 2001, South Sydney fought its way back into the competition following a string of high-profile legal battles against the National Rugby League and News Limited. A number of well attended public rallies took place during this time, as supporters from many different clubs got behind South Sydney's case. One of the most influential people in the fight was then board member, current prime minister of Australia Anthony Albanese. Upon appeal to the Federal Court in 2001, South Sydney won readmission into the premiership for the 2002 season.

=== National Rugby League (2002–present) ===
After being readmitted, South Sydney were initially unsuccessful in the premiership, finishing amongst the bottom three teams for five seasons straight including three wooden spoons. Following this, the club was taken over by actor Russell Crowe and businessman Peter Holmes à Court in 2006. In the 2007 season South Sydney played in its first finals campaign since 1989.

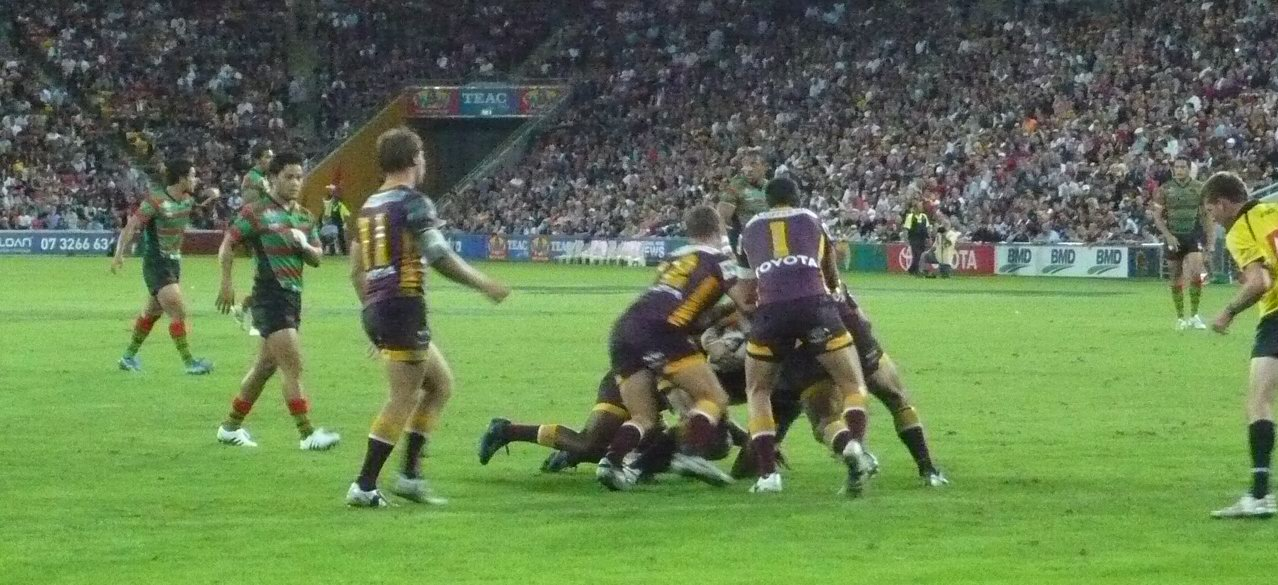
Broncos vs Rabbitohs 2008

May 2008 saw the sudden resignation of the then current executive chairman and CEO, Peter Holmes à Court. He had been appointed to the role of CEO at the start of 2008. Reports suggested that Holmes à Court had been forced to stand down after his relationship with Russell Crowe had deteriorated beyond repair.

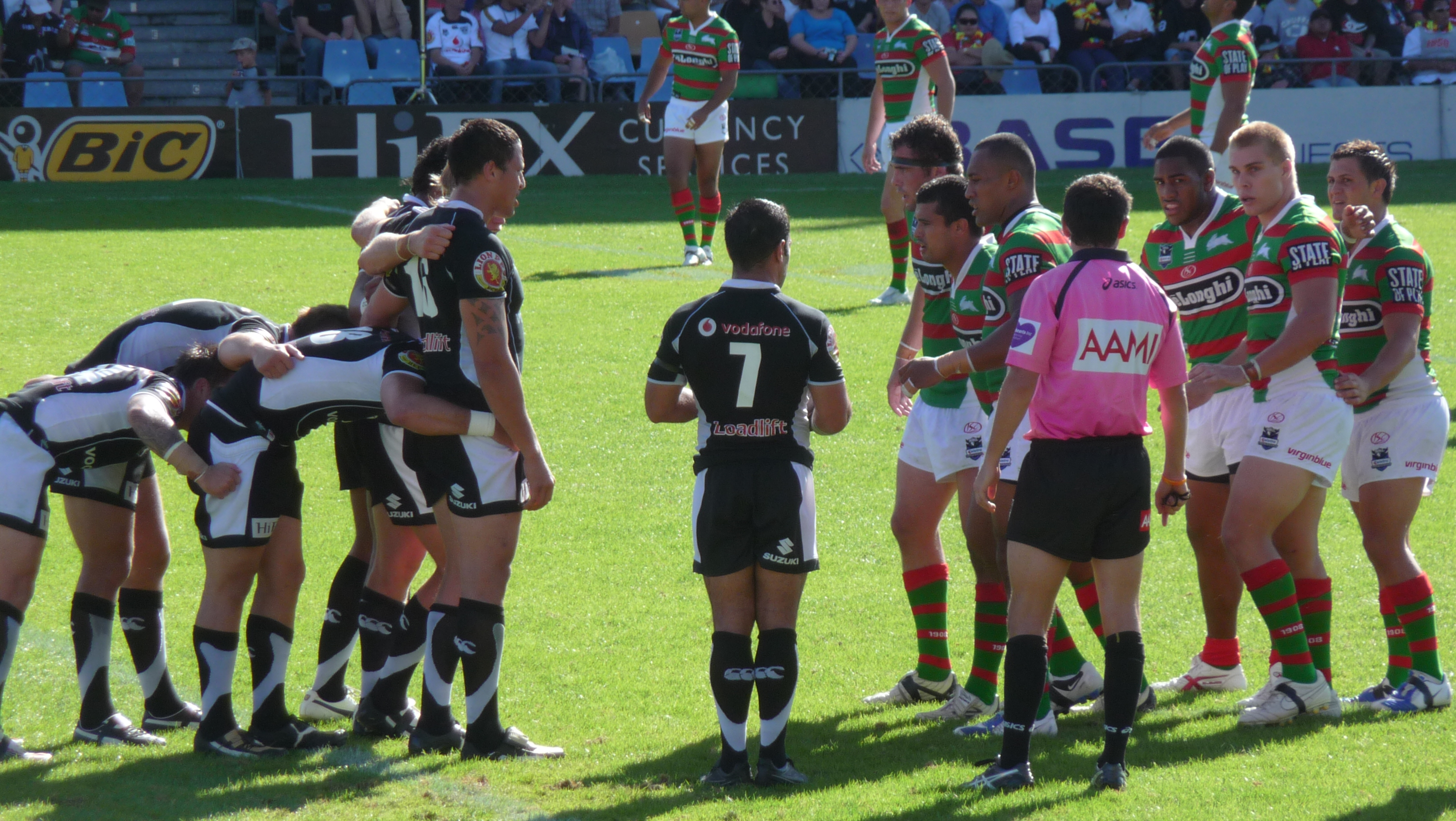
Warriors v Rabbitohs 2009

The South Sydney Rabbitohs celebrated its centenary year during the 2008 National Rugby League season. That year the club were named the National Trust's inaugural 'Community Icon', in recognition of the club's significant longstanding contribution to sport and sporting culture at both state and national levels.

==== Return to premiership success ====
The arrival of Sam Burgess and Greg Inglis to the club in the early 2010s saw South Sydney qualify for the finals. In April 2011, Souths announced Michael Maguire would replace retiring coach John Lang for the 2012 season, signing as head coach on a three-year deal. Following consecutive preliminary final exits in 2012 and 2013, it defeated the Sydney Roosters in the 2014 preliminary final to advance to its first grand final since the successful 1971 campaign.

Following a slim 6–0 lead in the first half of the 2014 grand final, Souths scored four second half tries to defeat Canterbury 30–6. This was South Sydney's first premiership win in 43 years. Sam Burgess received the Clive Churchill medal despite playing the entire match with a fractured cheekbone, suffered from a head clash during the first tackle of the match.

Following the premiership victory, South Sydney were presented with the Keys to the City of Randwick by Mayor Ted Seng at a presentation ceremony at Souths Juniors in Kingsford and later the same day awarded the Keys to the City of Sydney by Lord Mayor Clover Moore at a reception at Sydney Town Hall.

On 23 October 2014, Holmes à Court sold his 50% share of Blackcourt League Investments, and consequently his 37.5% stake in South Sydney, to James Packer's Consolidated Press Holdings.

After elimination early in the 2015 finals series, a nine-game winning streak in 2018 saw South Sydney return to premiership contention. This season marked the start of five consecutive preliminary finals appearances in the late 2010s and early 2020s. After losses in consecutive years to the Sydney Roosters, Canberra, and Penrith, Souths defeated Manly in 2021 to advance to the grand final against Penrith.

With the game poised at 8–8 in the second half, Cody Walker threw a pass that was intercepted by Panthers winger Stephen Crichton who scored untouched. Souths scored in the final five minutes of the match, but halfback Adam Reynolds missed the conversion from the sideline and a subsequent field-goal attempt, either of which would have seen the game tied. Penrith won the game 14–12. Penrith would also defeat South Sydney in the 2022 preliminary final, ending Souths' season for the third year in a row.

Prior to the 2022 season, Atlassian founder Mike Cannon-Brookes became a partial owner of the Rabbitohs by buying one third of the management firm alongside Crowe and Packer. Together, these three own 75% of the Rabbitohs; the remaining 25% of the club is owned by fans. Despite sitting 2nd at the midway point of 2023, Souths only won four of their remaining thirteen fixtures to miss the finals series. South Sydney started the 2024 NRL season poorly winning only one game from their opening seven matches. On 30 April 2024, head coach Jason Demetriou was sacked by the club with Ben Hornby replacing him as interim head coach. South Sydney would finish the 2024 NRL season in 16th place on the table managing only eight wins all year. South Sydney started the 2025 NRL season winning four of their opening five games. However, like what happened in the 2024 season, the club was hit hard with injuries and suspensions. During the midway period of the year, South Sydney had lost nine games in a row and at one stage found themselves on the bottom of the table. In round 23, South Sydney narrowly defeated the Gold Coast in the "spoon bowl" match to lift themselves off last place. The club would then record back to back victories over Parramatta and St. George Illawarra to finish 14th on the table. In the 2026 NRL season, South Sydney finished 6th on the table and qualified for the finals. The club were eliminated from the finals in the first week after losing 10-20 to Newcastle.

== Club symbols ==
=== Emblem ===
The club mascot is the rabbitoh, a now-disused term that was commonly used in the early 20th century to describe hawkers who captured and skinned rabbits and then sold the meat at markets, so named because they would shout "rabbit-oh!" around the markets and suburbs to attract buyers. The club is also informally referred to as the Rabbits, Bunnies or Souths.

Exactly how South Sydney came to be known as the Rabbitohs is unknown. According to one version of events, dating from pre-schism days at the turn of the 20th century, some of the club's players earned some extra money on Saturday mornings as rabbit-oh men, staining their jerseys with rabbit blood in the process; when they played in those blood stained jumpers that afternoon, opponents from wealthier rugby clubs did not always appreciate the aroma and would mockingly repeat the "Rabbitoh!" cry. Another version was that the term was a disparaging reference by opposing teams to South's home ground being plagued with "rabbit 'oles"; in those early days Redfern Oval was then known as Nathan's Cow Paddock. A third version claims the Rabbitoh name was adopted from that of the touring Australian rugby union teams of the early 1900s who were nicknamed "Rabbits" prior to discarding the name in 1908 in favour of the moniker "Wallabies".

The "Rabbitoh" emblem, a running white rabbit, first appeared on the team's jersey in 1959. The Rabbitoh emblem has in various forms been carried as the club's crest on every player's jersey ever since. The original "Rabbitoh" emblem design that appeared on the team's jerseys throughout the 1960s and 1970s has now been incorporated on the current jersey.

The South Sydney Rabbitohs celebrated its centenary year during 2008. The club released a centenary emblem to commemorate the occasion. To also coincide with the centenary year, Souths opted to alter the logo by removing the red and green oval from the emblem for a solid white rabbit with the words South Sydney Rabbitohs set in uppercase type.

=== Colours ===
South Sydney has used cardinal red and myrtle green colours on its playing jerseys for the vast majority of the club's history.

Prior to the establishment of the district rugby league club in 1908, the local South Sydney rugby union club founded in 1900 wore a green and red coloured jersey in a unique 2-to-1 ratio hooped design copied from one of its 1899 predecessor clubs Randwick FC. The "myrtle green and cardinal" colours were likely chosen as a direct literal representation ("canting") of the name of the club's central suburb Redfern ("red fern").

The Souths rugby league club's jersey has been a hooped-styled one comprising alternating red and green, and has been used for the vast majority of the club's history. In 1945 and 1946 the club broke with this tradition and used a green design with a red "V" around the collar, before reverting to the original hoop style. From 1980 to 1984 the team played in a strip which saw the inclusion of white hoops within a predominately green design with a central red stripe and was affectionately known as the "Minties" jersey (so-called due to its apparent similarity to the wrapper design of the popular sweet). With the introduction of "away" jerseys towards the end of the 20th century, the club initially introduced a predominantly white jersey for away matches which was changed to a predominantly black one for the 2006 season.

Before the start of the 2007 season, the club announced that the away jersey would be styled identically to the traditional home jersey, with the exception of sponsorship and the rabbit emblem, which has been styled similarly to the one that initially featured on jerseys in the 1960s. For season 2009, the rabbit emblem is black for home matches whilst the emblem is the original white for away matches.

The playing shorts worn were historically black, though in the late 1970s the club adopted green shorts with a red vertical stripe. This was then superseded by the white shorts of the "Minties" outfit. When the club subsequently reverted to the traditional playing strip, the decision was made to wear black shorts once more. In 2008 the Rabbitohs wore white shorts to match the white stripe running down the side of the jersey.

South Sydney Rabbitohs – Jerseys

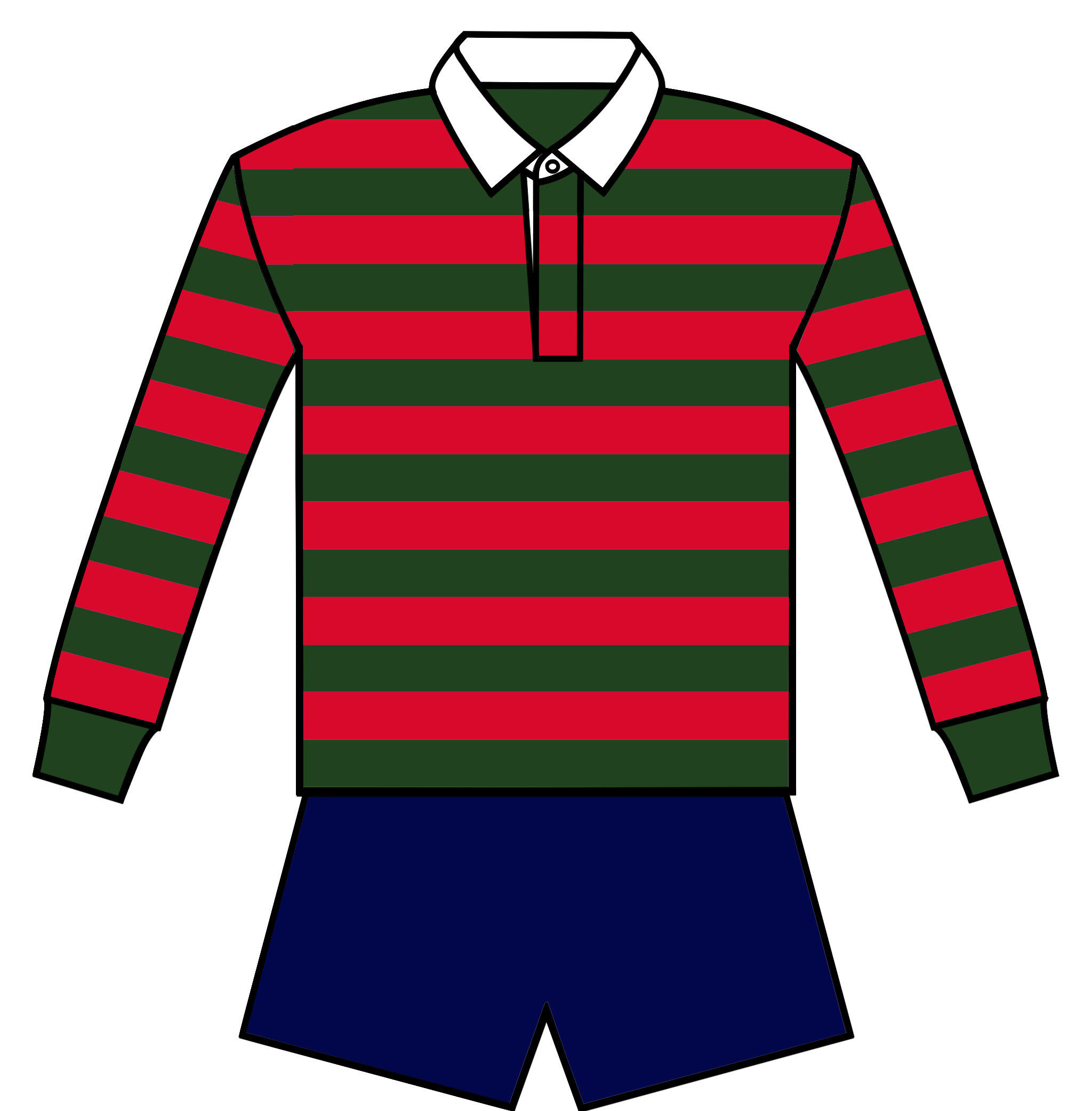
1908

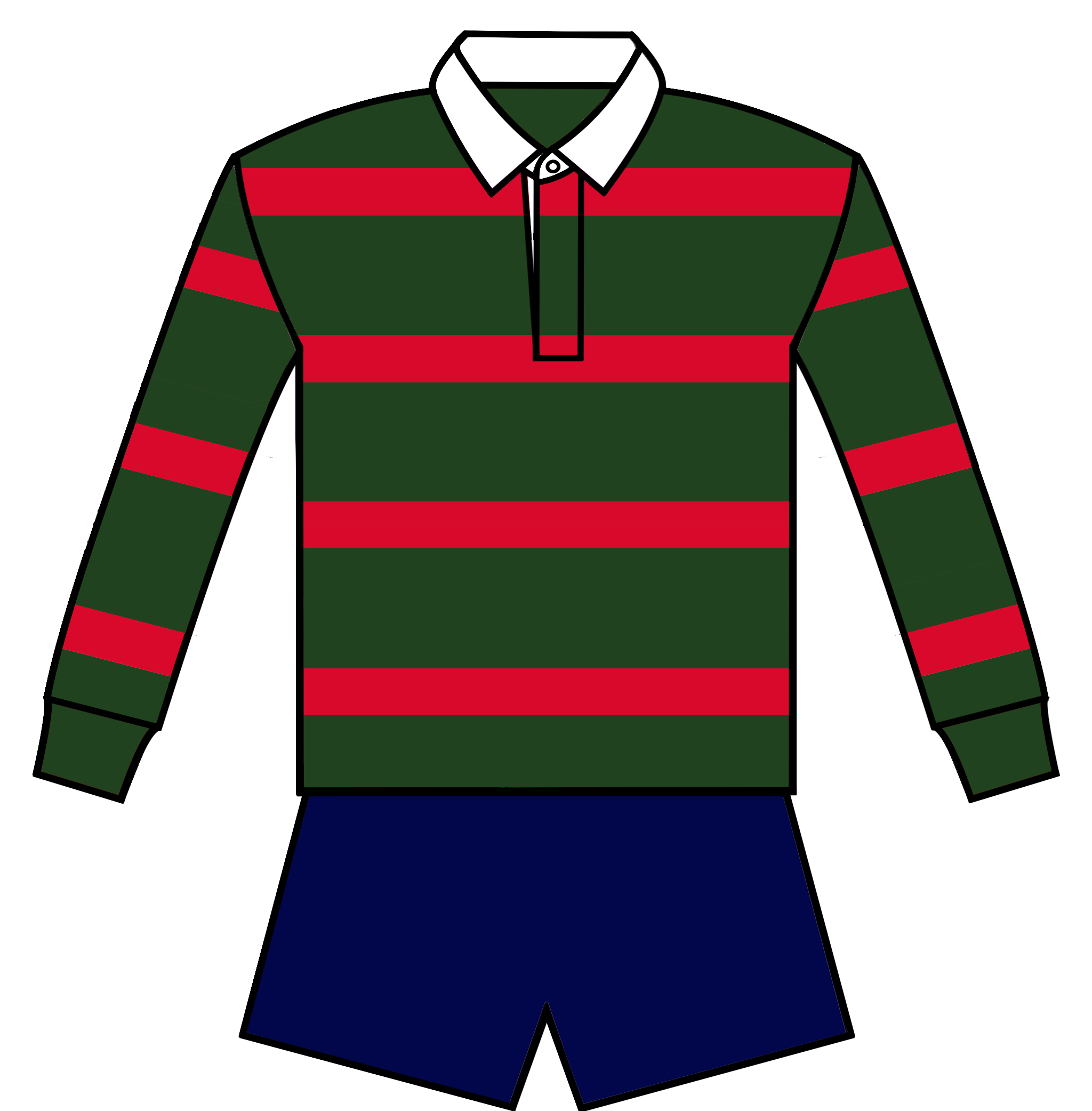
1909–1944, 1947–1958

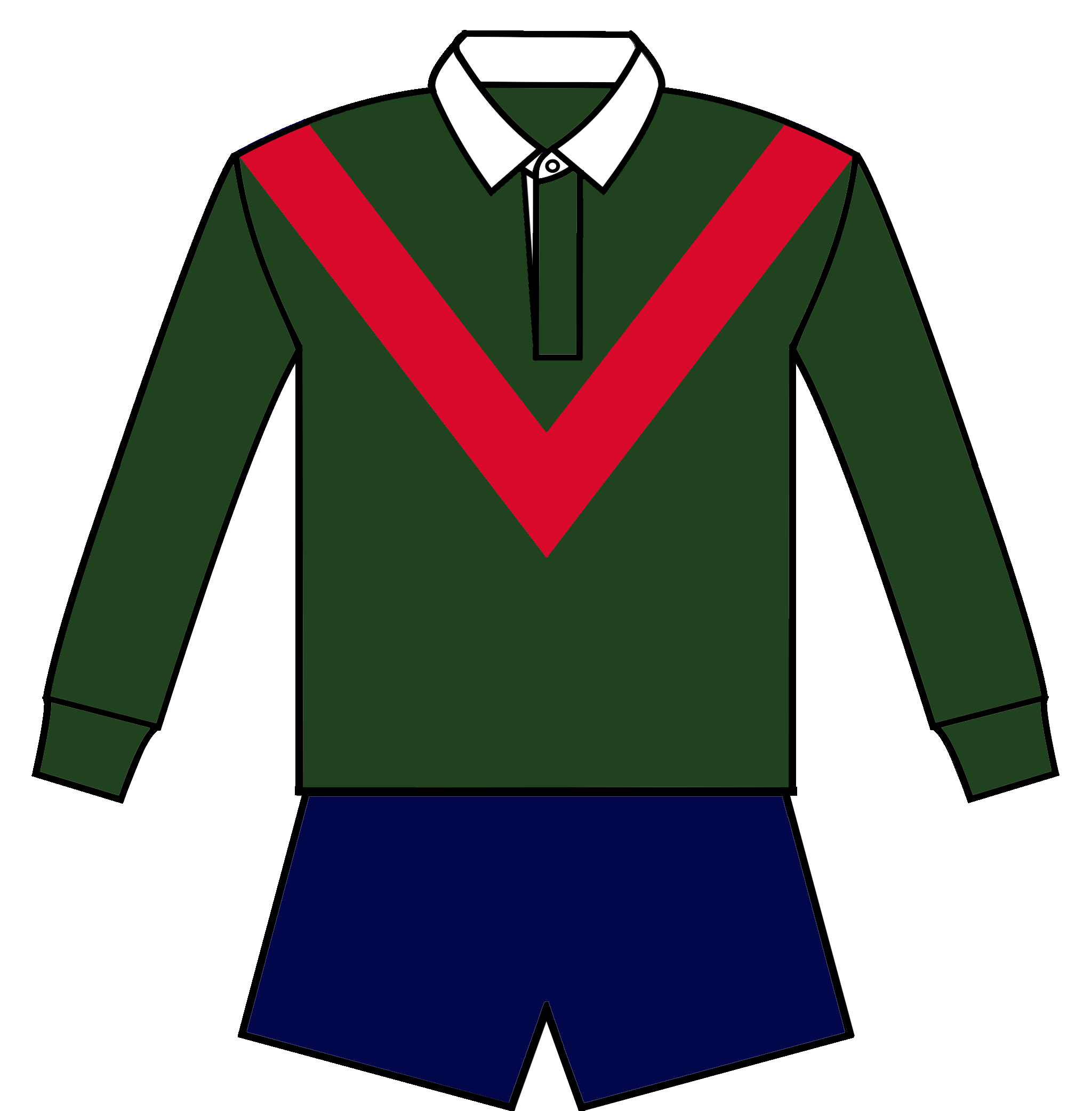
1945–1946

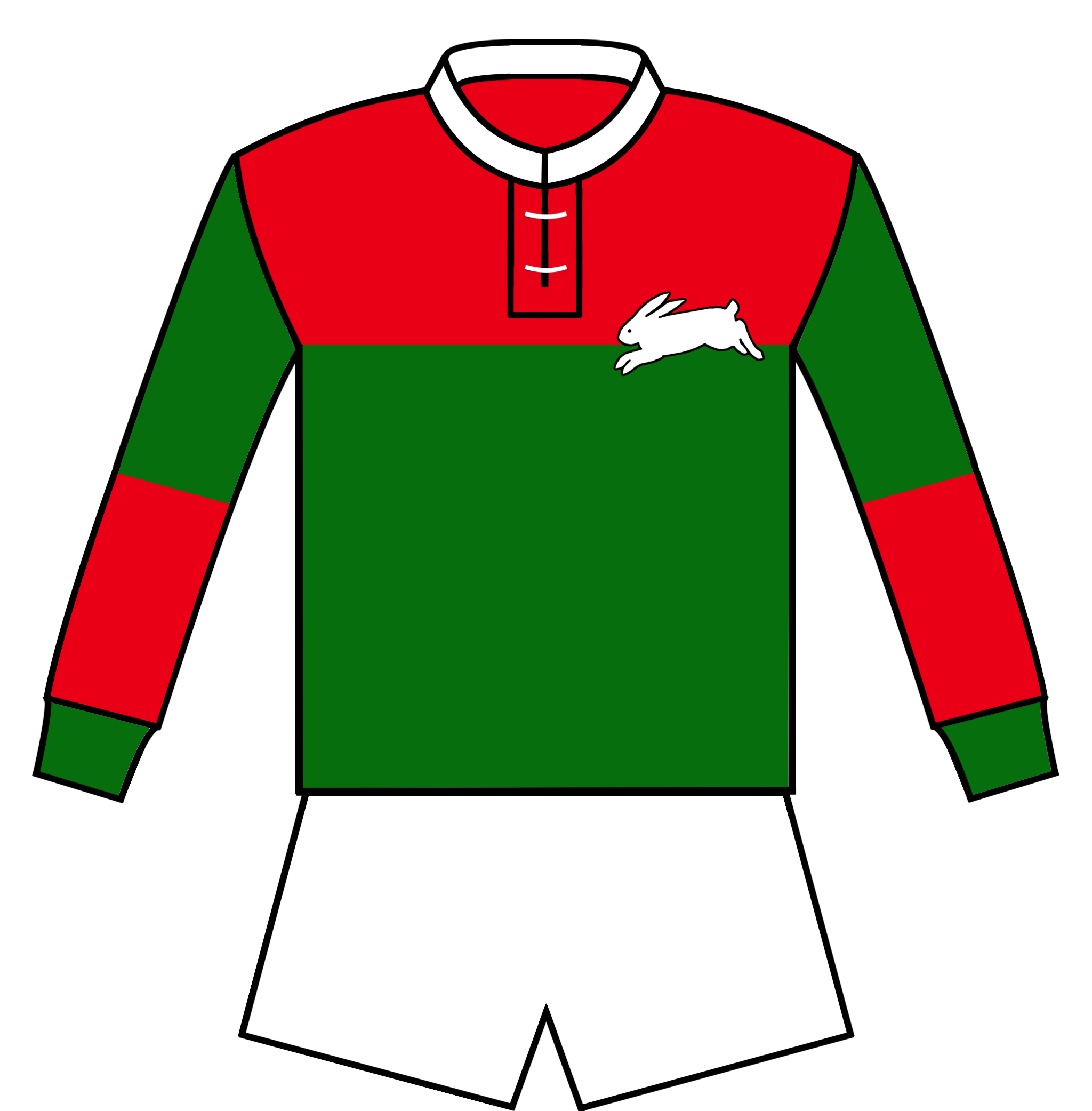
1959–1964

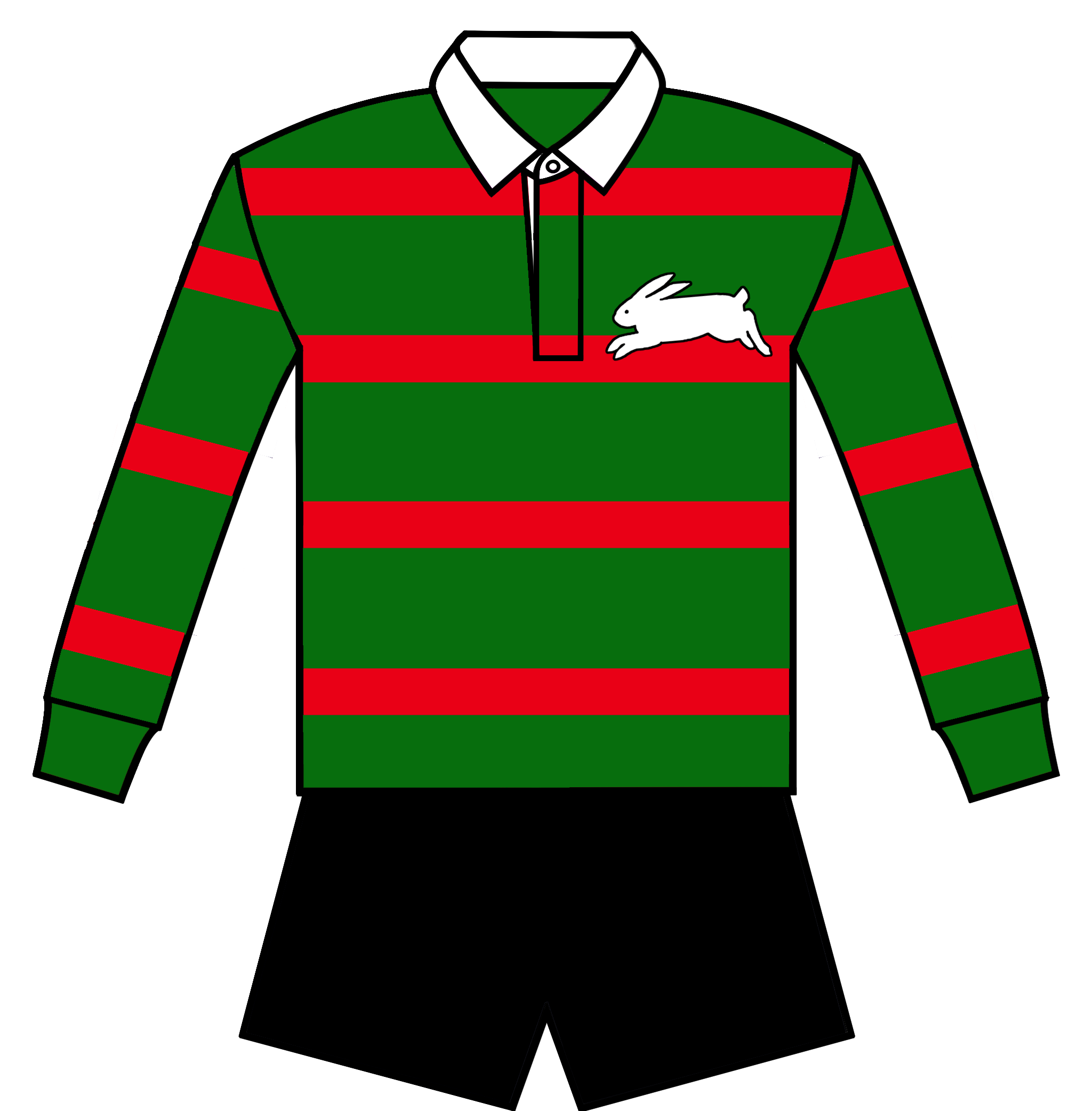
1965–1974

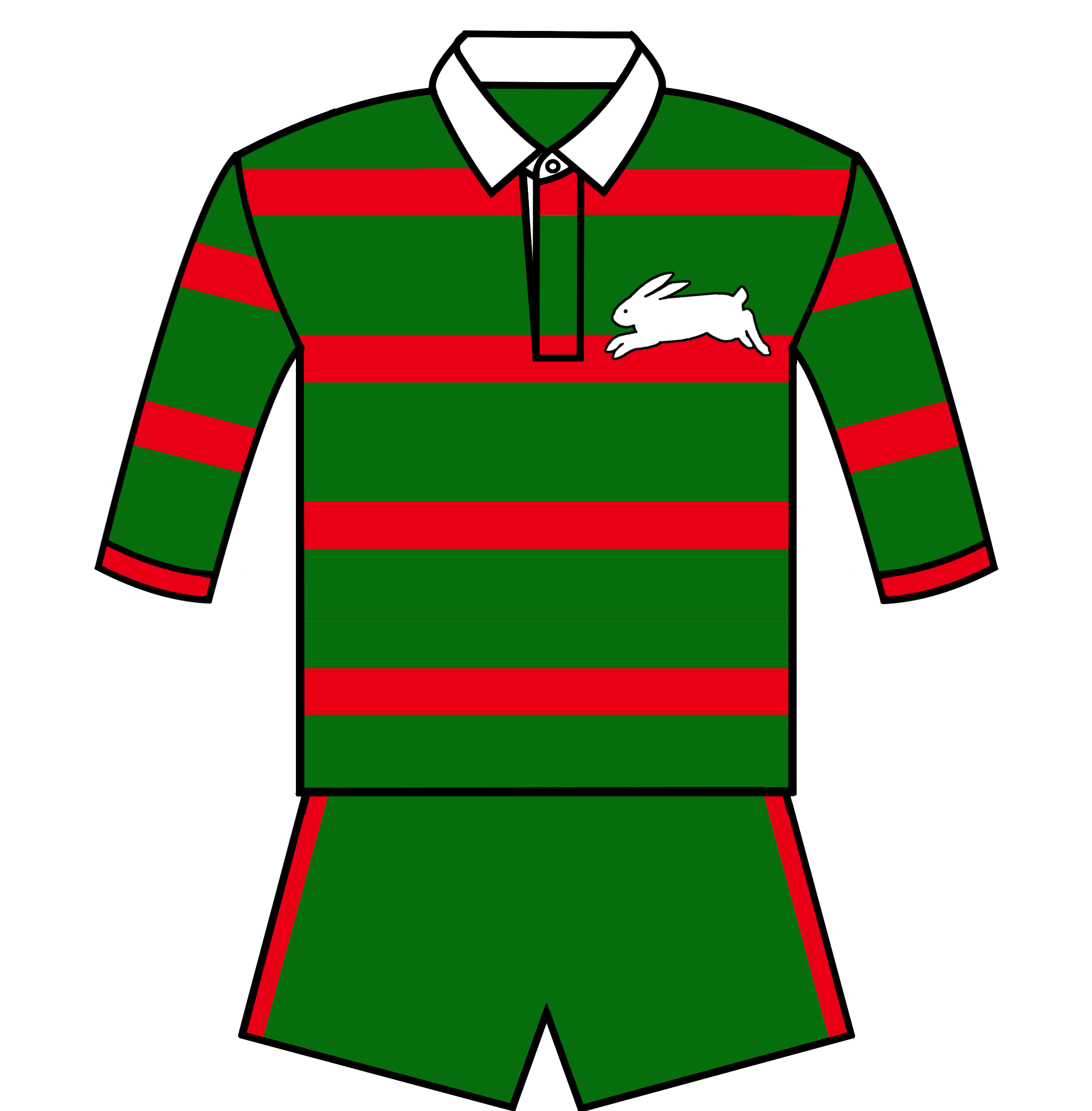
1975–1976

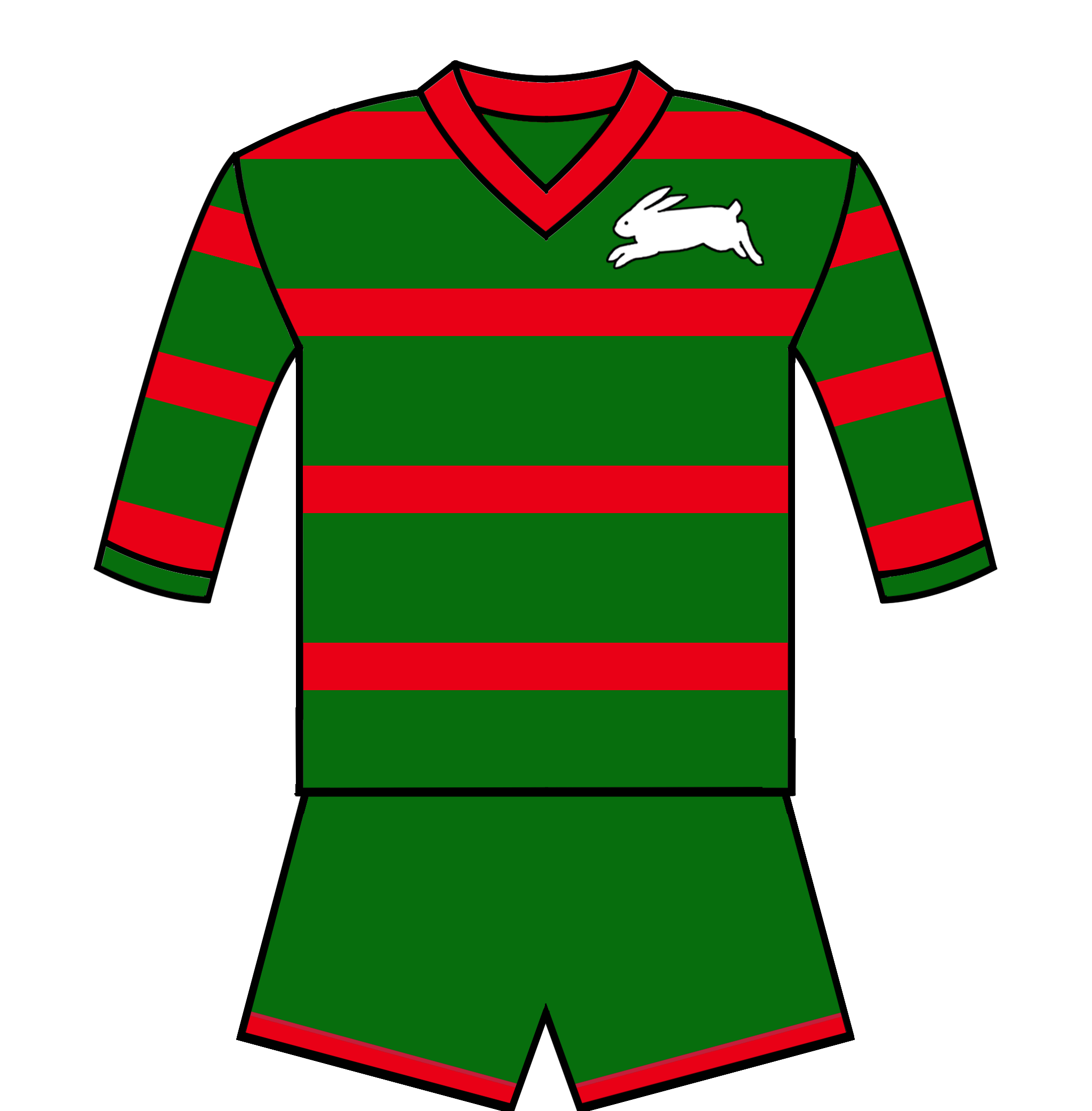
1977–1979

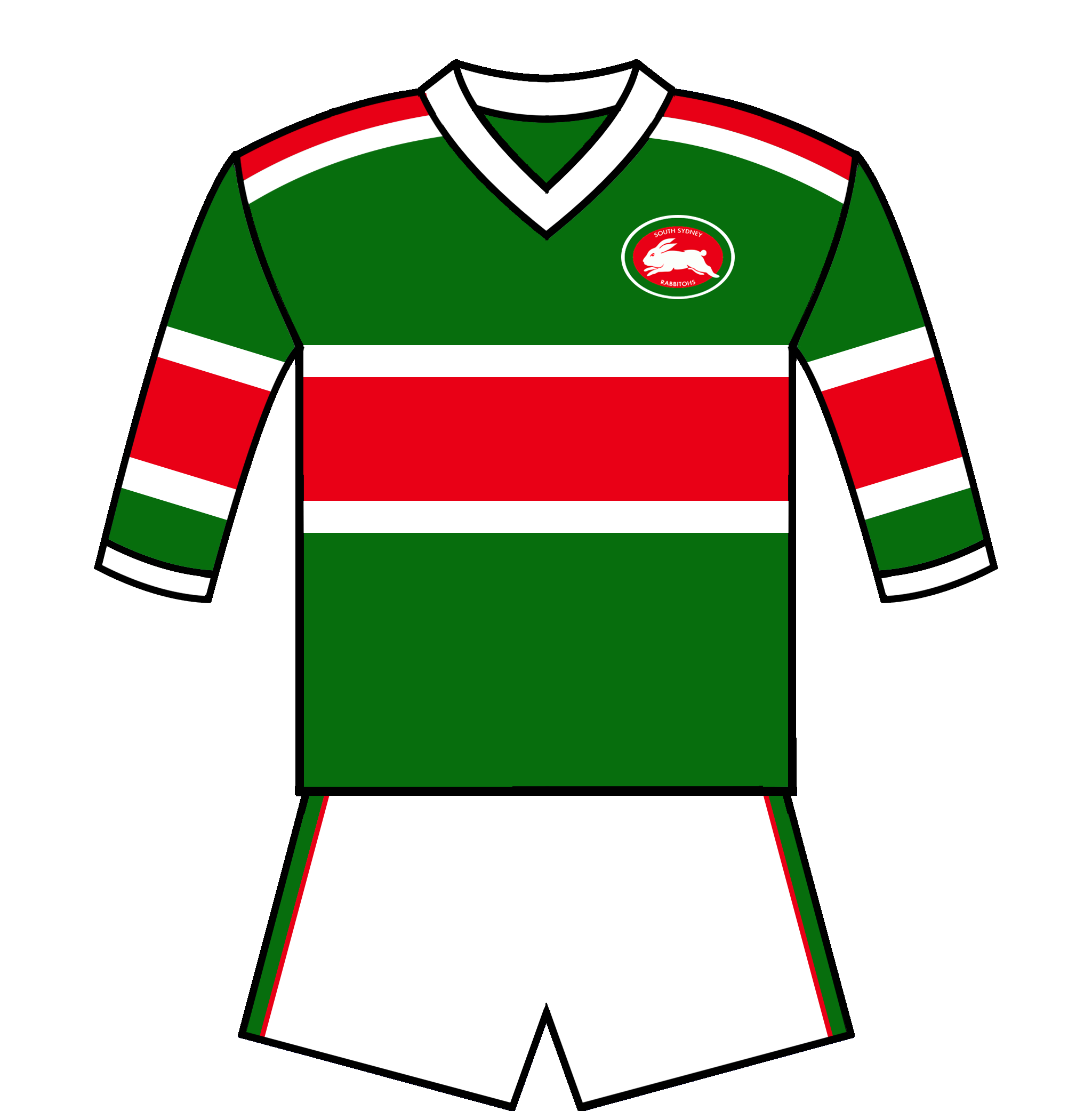
1980–1984

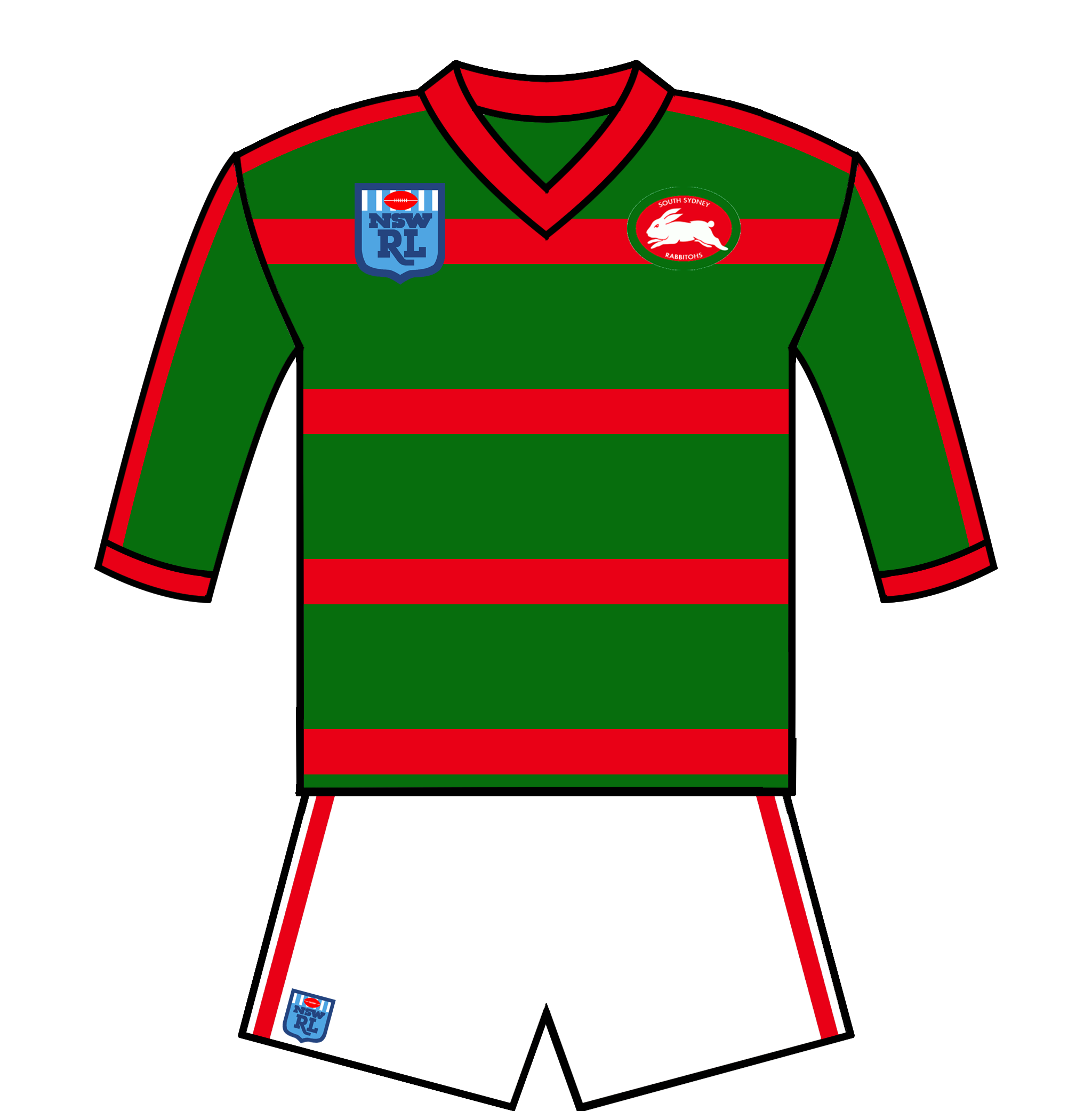
1985–1993

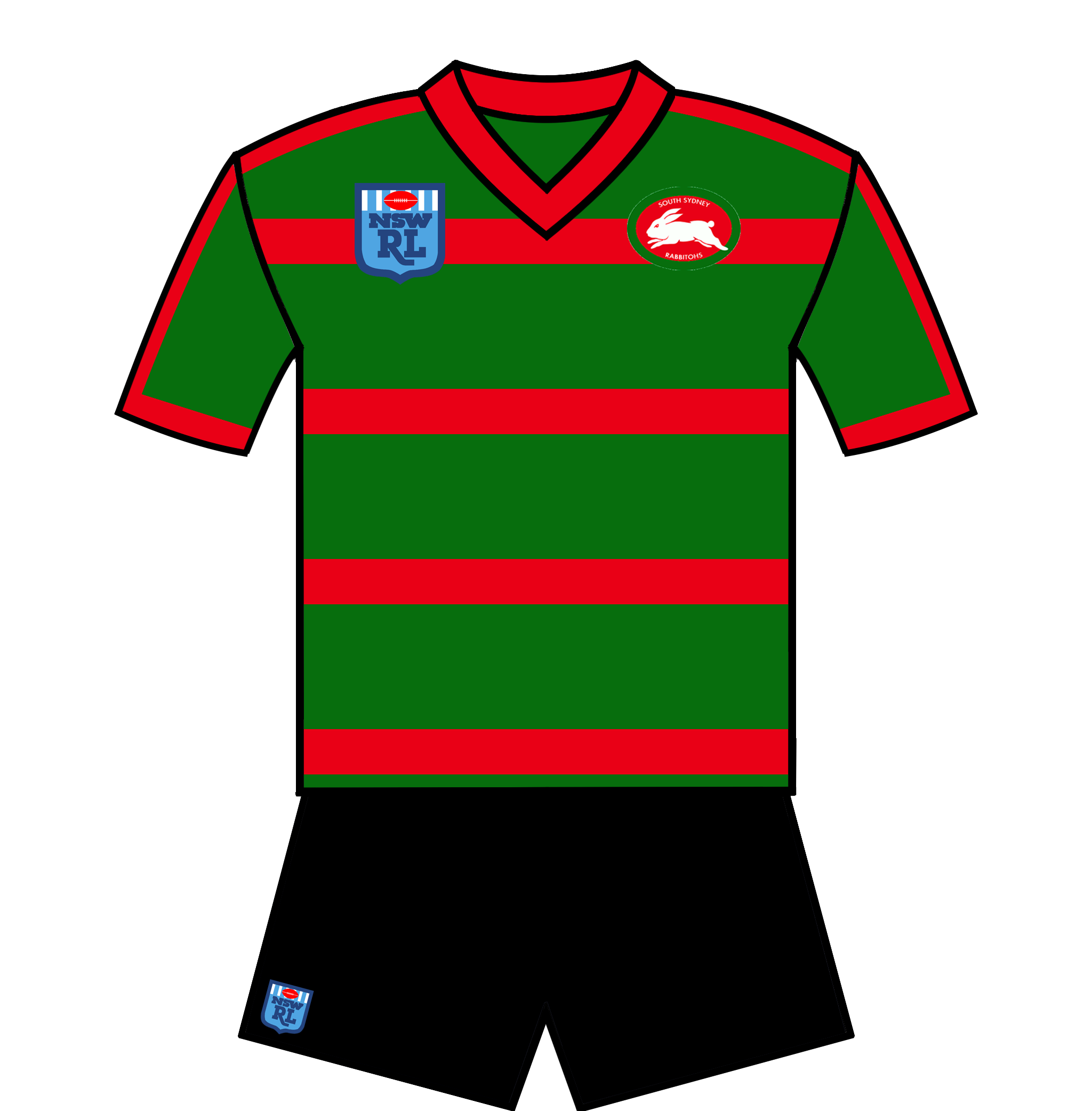
1994–1996

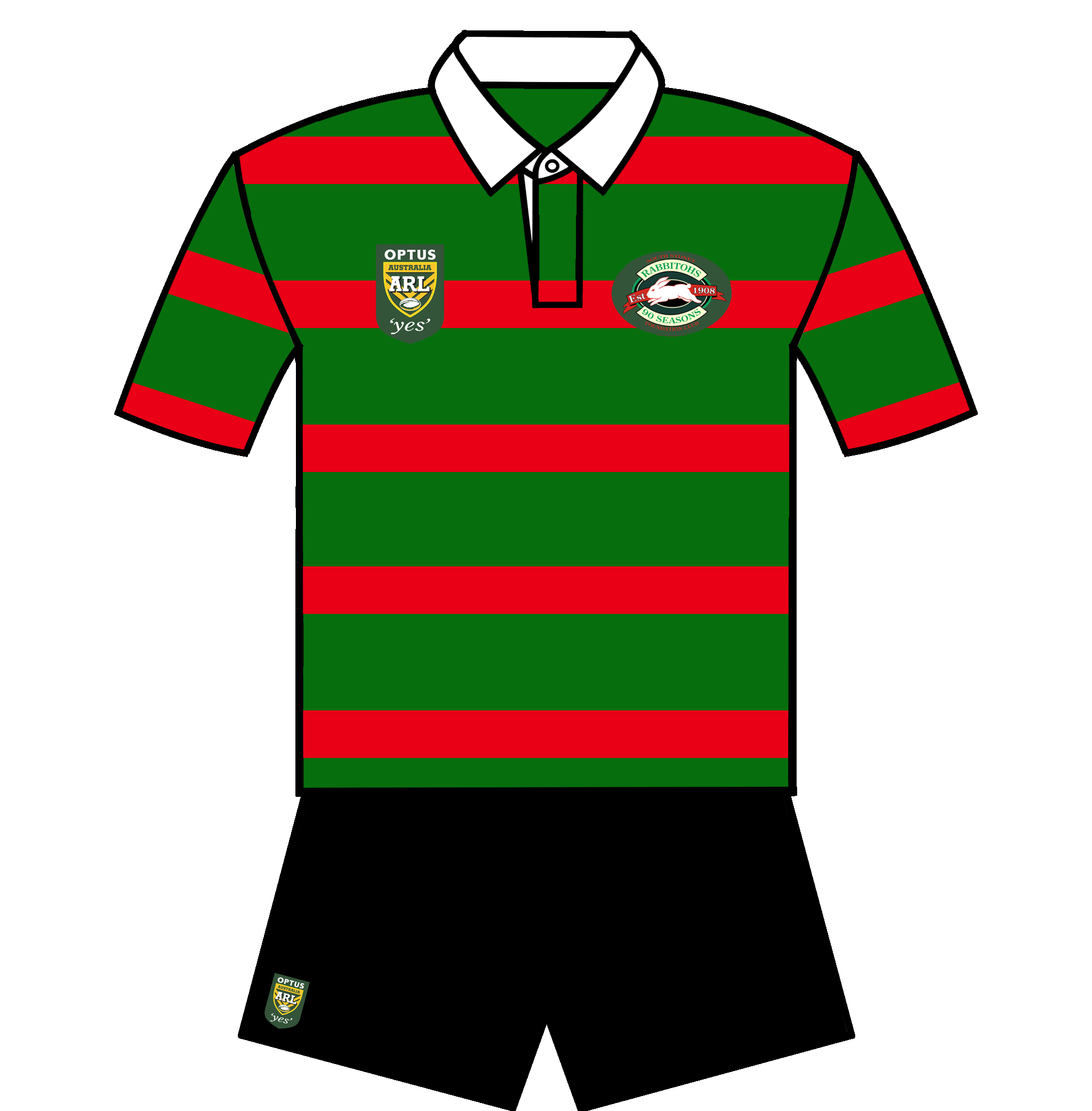
1997–1999

== Geographic area ==
The South Sydney District Rugby League Football Club (precursor to the current corporate entity) was formed, under the original 1908 articles of association with the NSWRL competition, to represent the Sydney municipalities of Alexandria, Botany, Mascot, Waterloo, Redfern and Darlington and the southern parts of the City of Sydney.

== Stadium ==
During the early years of the New South Wales Rugby League premiership, "home games" were not assigned very often. However, South Sydney played most of its games at the Royal Agricultural Society Ground (Sydney Showground) from 1908 until the club's departure in 1920. From 1911 onwards, the Sydney Sports Ground was also used interchangeably with the Agricultural Ground over a decade for hosting matches. In 1947 the club played its final season at the Sports Ground, before relocating to Redfern Oval in 1948. It was here that team played in the heart of the club's territory and played the vast majority of its allocated home matches.

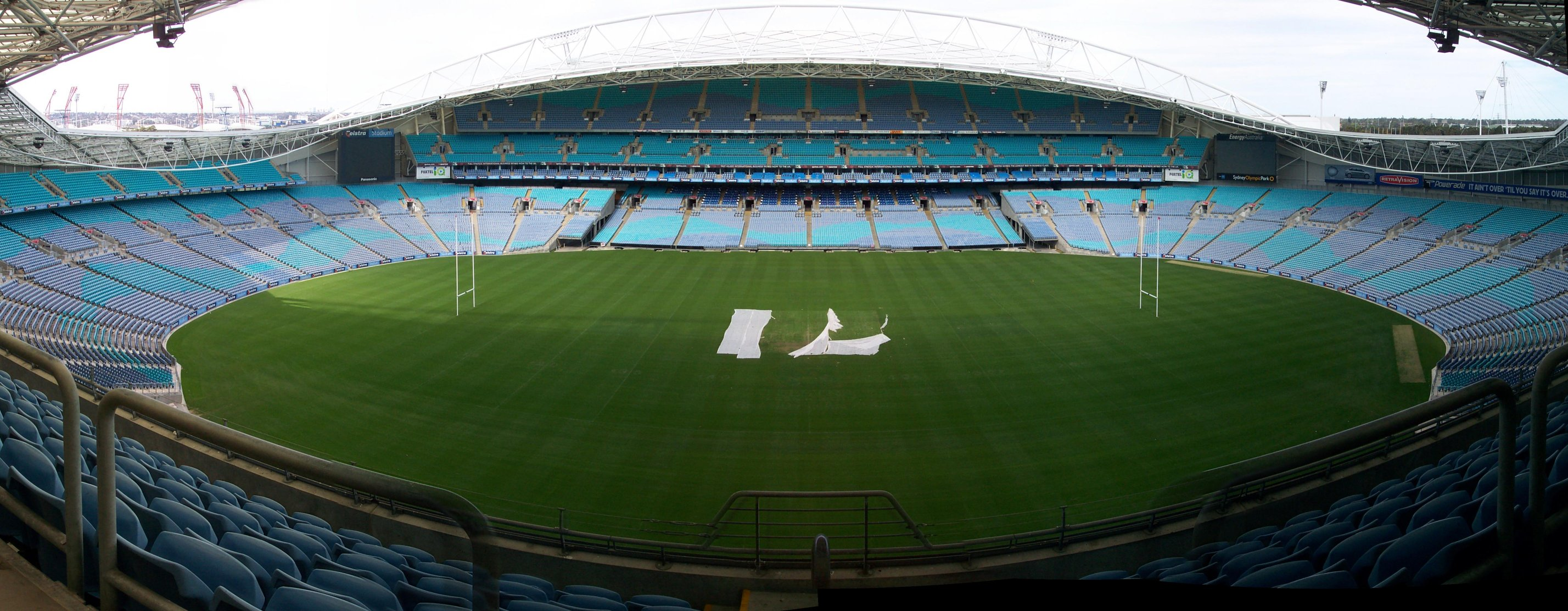
Stadium Australia, the Rabbitohs current home ground.

In 1988, the club began to play in the Sydney Football Stadium, just built upon the former Sydney Sports Ground and Sydney Cricket Ground No. 2 Oval. The side continued to play here up until 2005, with the exception of 2000 and 2001 when South Sydney was absent from the premiership. During 2004–2005, when the Rabbitoh's contract with Sydney Football Stadium was about to expire, new home grounds were investigated at Gosford, North Sydney Oval and Stadium Australia. Eventually the decision was made to relocate to Stadium Australia at Sydney Olympic Park. The move was generally not well received by the fans, but provided considerably more income for the club, which was several million dollars in the red at the end of 2005. In 2008, the club renewed its partnership with Stadium Australia to play NRL home games and home finals at the venue for the next 10 years.

Redfern Oval, Rabbitohs vs Wests Tigers pre-season trial game, 8 February 2009.

During 2008, the City of Sydney Council completed a $19.5 million upgrade and renovation of Redfern Oval. From season 2009, the upgraded Redfern Oval provided the Rabbitohs with training facilities and a venue for hosting pre-season and exhibition matches.

In 2023, the Rabbitohs relocated its headquarters and first team training facilities from Redfern Oval to the Heffron Centre, a $58M community sporting complex in Maroubra owned by Randwick City Council. The South Sydney Rabbitohs’ $26M Community and High Performance Centre provides training facilities for the NRL, Women's and NSW Cup teams, as well as facilities for the administrative, commercial and Souths Cares staff members.

== Supporters ==
The South Sydney Rabbitohs continue to have a large supporter base in its traditional areas of South-eastern Sydney, despite having moved from Redfern Oval two decades ago, while also enjoying wide support throughout other rugby league playing centres around the country. The official South Sydney supporter group is known as "The Burrow".

South Sydney at one stage had the highest football club membership in the National Rugby League, with membership exceeding 35,000 as of June 23, 2015. That member number also included more than 11,000 ticketed members, the highest of the Sydney-based NRL clubs. Following the conclusion of the 2021 NRL season, new figures showed South Sydney to have the second highest membership of Sydney NRL clubs behind Parramatta.

It was announced during the 2010 Charity Shield game that both St. George Illawarra and Souths had exceeded the 10,000 milestone, making the 2010 season the first time two Sydney clubs had entered the season with 10,000 ticketed members each. The club had members from every state in Australia and international members in 22 countries. Football club membership peaked at some 22,000 when the club was re-admitted to the National Rugby League for season 2002.

The club's popularity extends far beyond its local catchment area. Publicly available Rabbitohs membership demographic data shows that in 2015, 22 per cent of Rabbitohs fans lived from Strathfield through to Liverpool and Campbelltown, 16 per cent in the Hills District, Parramatta and Greater West, 20 per cent in the inner-west or south-east such as Hurstville or Menai, 16 per cent from the Central Coast, Illawarra or other regional areas, and 10 per cent in Sydney's eastern suburbs including Randwick, Coogee, Maroubra and Botany. According to official club membership data in 2020, 9 per cent of Rabbitohs members lived in South-East Queensland, 10 per cent in the Central Coast, 30 per cent in Western Sydney, 5 per cent in Inner Sydney and the Eastern Suburbs, and 3 per cent in Western Australia.

"Group 14", a collection of club backers including businessmen, politicians, musicians and media personalities, was formed before the Rabbitohs' exclusion from the NRL in 1999. Members include Anthony Albanese, Laurie Brereton, Michael Cheika, Rodger Corser, Michael Daley, Andrew Denton, Cathy Freeman, Nick Greiner, Deirdre Grusovin, Ron Hoenig, Ray Martin, Mikey Robins, and Mike Whitney. They contributed to South Sydney's bid for reinstatement, following the club's exclusion from the competition at the end of the 1999 season. A sustained campaign of public support that year, unprecedented in Australian sporting history, saw 40,000 people attend a rally in the Sydney CBD in support of South Sydney's cause. In 2000 and 2001, public street marches took place in Sydney with in excess of 80,000 people rallying behind the Rabbitohs. The club also has a number of high-profile supporters as well, many of whom were dominant figures in Souths' battle to be readmitted into the premiership in 2000 and 2001. In 2007, supporters set a new club record for attendance with an average home crowd figure of 15,702 being the highest ever since the introduction of the home and away system in 1974.

In 2023, 31st Prime Minister of Australia, Anthony Albanese, a lifelong South Sydney supporter, was named the club's number-one ticket holder.

=== Notable supporters ===
South Sydney have many notable supporters, many of whom have engaged with the club through the ownership of Russell Crowe.

- Ben Affleck, American actor
- Anthony Albanese, 31st Prime Minister of Australia
- Pamela Anderson, Canadian actress
- Christian Bale, British actor
- Boris Becker, former German tennis champion
- Richard Branson, British entrepreneur
- Laurie Brereton, Australian politician
- Michael Cheika, former Wallabies coach
- Rodger Corser, Australian actor
- Russell Crowe, New Zealand-Australian actor and part owner of the Rabbitohs
- Michael Daley, Australian politician
- Andrew Denton, Australian television presenter
- Snoop Dogg, American rapper
- Cathy Freeman, Olympian most famous for 400m win at Sydney 2000
- Stephen Fry, British actor
- Chris Green, South African-Australian cricketer
- Nick Greiner, 37th premier of New South Wales
- Deirdre Grusovin, Australian politician
- Adam Hills, Australian television presenter
- Lleyton Hewitt, Australian Grand Slam tennis champion
- Ron Hoenig, Australian politician
- Eddie Jones, former Wallabies coach
- Kristina Keneally, 42nd Premier of New South Wales
- Jay Leno, American television presenter
- Ray Martin, Australian television presenter
- Eva Mendes, American actress
- Martina Navratilova, Czech-American tennis player
- Cameron Norrie, British tennis player
- Graham Norton, British television presenter
- Jamie Oliver, British celebrity chef
- Ricky Ponting, former Australian cricket team captain
- Natalie Portman, American actor
- Pat Power, former Auxiliary Bishop of the Roman Catholic Archdiocese of Canberra and Goulburn
- Kagiso Rabada, South African cricketer
- Burt Reynolds, American actor
- Mikey Robins, Australian TV presenter
- Cristiano Ronaldo, Portuguese soccer player and multiple Ballon d'Or winner
- Tanveer Sangha, Australian cricketer
- Mike Whitney, former Australian cricketer and television host
- Oprah Winfrey, American talk show host

=== Reggie the Rabbit ===
Reggie the Rabbit is the Rabbitohs' mascot. The mascot first appeared in lifesize form in 1968 after celebrity fan Don Lane brought back a suit from the US in time for the 1968 grand final against Manly Warringah Sea Eagles, won by the Rabbitohs 13–9. Perhaps the most notable of the early Reggies was the club's groundsman Reg Fridd. Standing just over four feet tall, the Rabbitohs lured the diminutive New Zealander from a touring production of Snow White and the Seven Dwarves, the same troupe that had yielded the second Reggie, Roscoe Bova, killed in a car accident in the early 1970s. Most teams in the National Rugby League maintain mascots. During 2000 and 2001, when Souths was excluded from the NRL, Anth Courtney was Reggie Rabbit appearing at the second Town Hall rally and at games at Redfern Oval as well as being active in travelling extensively around the state to attend fundraisers as Reggie Rabbit.

Charlie Gallico has been South Sydney's Reggie Rabbit since 2002,

== South Sydney Leagues Club ==
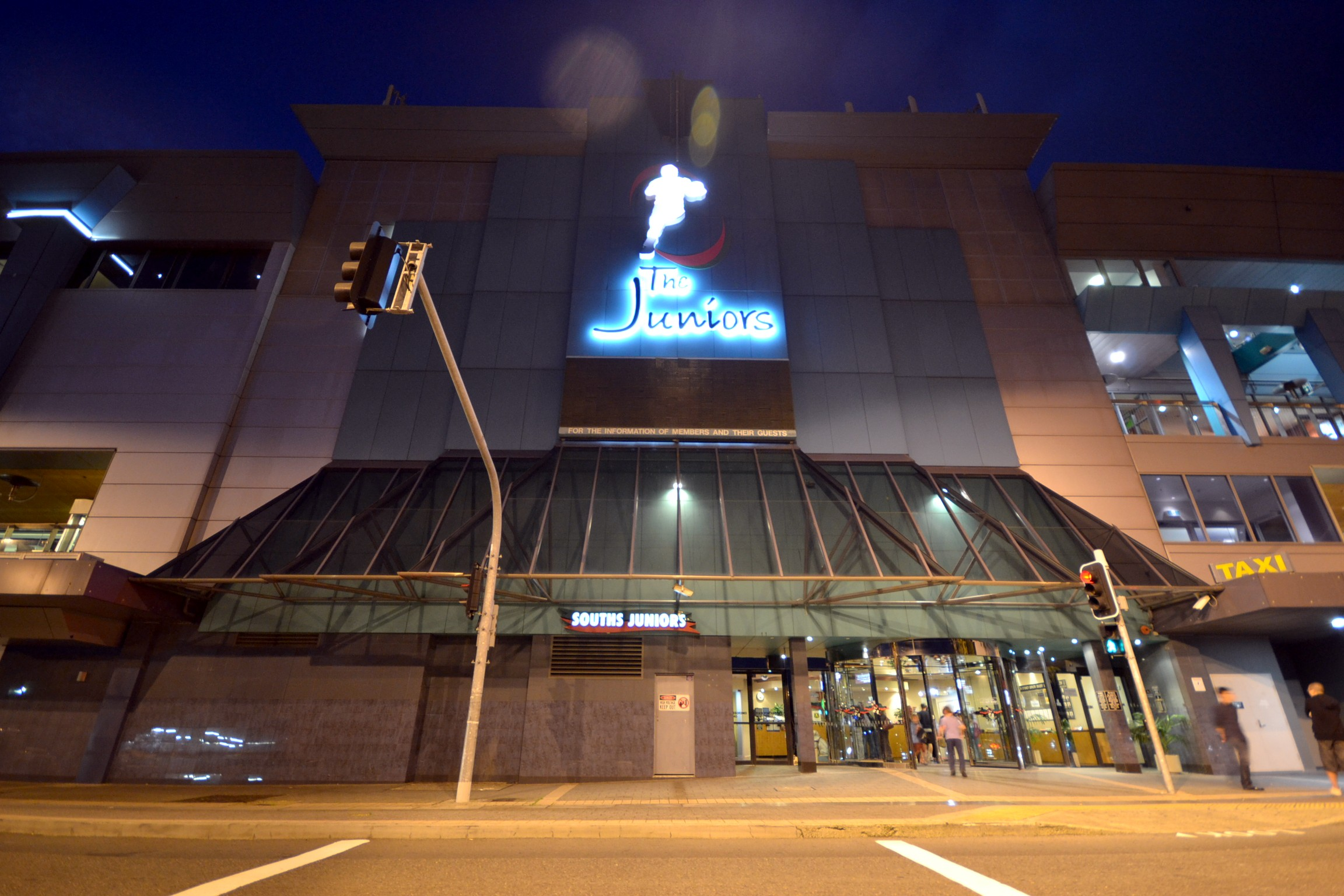
Souths Juniors on Anzac Parade in Kingsford

=== The Juniors ===
The Juniors, also known as Souths Juniors, on Anzac Parade in Kingsford, New South Wales, has been the club's leagues club since the old Souths Leagues closed in 2013. The club is owned by the South Sydney District Junior Rugby Football League. The Juniors licensed club was formed in 1959 to support the junior league.

==== Juniors at the Junction ====
Juniors @ The Junction (Since 2009) – The result of a merger between South Sydney Junior Rugby League Club (Kingsford) and the Maroubra Returned and Services League (RSL) Club. The club is on the site of the former Maroubra RSL club on Anzac Parade and Haig Street.

==== The Juniors Malabar ====
The Juniors Malabar, formerly Malabar RSL, is a social and registered club. It is part of The Juniors Group of Clubs.

==== The Juniors on Hawkesbury ====
The Juniors on Hawkesbury is a holiday resort, guest house and social club in Lower Portland, New South Wales, on the banks of the Hawkesbury River, owned since 2008 and operated by the South Sydney Junior Rugby League Club.

=== South Sydney Leagues Club ===
The South Sydney Leagues Club, colloquially known as Souths Leagues, was the club's official leagues club. The club closed in 2013 after being placed into administration with large debts.

== Culture and tradition ==
In 1999 Russell Crowe bought the foundation bell in a charity auction at the Red and Green Ball the gave it back to the club.

=== Team songs ===
==== Glory, Glory to South Sydney ====
The club's most well known song is played when the team runs out for home games and after victories at home. Originally recorded in 1967 by the Will Dower Sounds as "South's Victory Song" [sic], "Glory, Glory to South Sydney" is a known NRL team song, prominently featuring in promotional materials, merchandise and even the #GGTSS hashtag.

The original version was written when there were 10 clubs in the NSWRFL premiership, and predates the admission of Penrith and Cronulla-Sutherland for the 1967 season.

The song is likely to have been inspired by the common Glory Glory chant, sharing the Battle Hymn of the Republic's tune, and coincided with the club's most recent "golden era". While the NSWRFL premiership had been won for 11 consecutive seasons by the St. George Dragons, the Rabbitohs had a strong team and won the 1967 NSWRFL premiership, going back-to-back in 1968 and winning all but one Grand Final between then and 1971.

The song was heavily played and featured in the club's "fightback" effort when Souths were excluded from the 14-team NRL seasons in 2000 and 2001. In 2004, Allan Caswell wrote an updated and modernised version, referencing the 15 teams in the NRL Telstra Premiership at the time, which was played at home games for several years before being replaced by the original.

Somewhat controversially, whilst sponsored by Real Insurance in 2005 and 2006, the club made its entrance to a version of The Real Thing as a tie-in. Upon the expiration of the deal, the club reverted to "Glory Glory", but this time a modernised pop version incorporating only the chorus and "South Sydney" chant sung by a female vocalist.

As of 2023, the original 1967 version is used officially by the club and featured at the club's 2014 and 2021 Grand Final appearances.

1967 Lyrics
South Sydney marches on!

Chorus:

Glory, Glory to South Sydney

Glory, Glory to South Sydney

Glory, Glory to South Sydney

South Sydney marches on

When speaking of the champions, one stands above the rest

Of glories old and records proud, when often put to test

Of fine traditions, history, that others cannot best

They wear the Red and Green

Chorus

They mauled the Balmain Tigers

Slew the Dragons from St. George

The Seagulls and the Mounties next

Were crushed by mighty force

They humbled Parramatta

And the Berries in due course

They wear the Red and Green

Chorus

They plucked the Western Magpies

Slashed the Newtown bag of blue

The Eastern Suburbs Rooster crowed

And then was conquered too

The greatest name in any game

Within South Sydney grew

They wear the Red and Green

Chorus x2

South Sydney marches on!

==== Victory song ====
The Rabbitohs' victory song (also known as the "player's song") appears to be of pre-WWII origin, but awareness has grown over the years and especially around the passing of club legend John Sattler, whose performances of the song around the club's 2014 and 2021 NRL Grand Final in various media have become somewhat iconic within the South Sydney community and were played after the club's win the week after his passing.

The lyrics have varied over the year in a form of Oral tradition - the current version sung by the players after a win only features the first verse/stanza, preceded recently (in 2023) by a player or special guest calling out "If You're Happy and You Know It", responded en masse with claps.

The tune of the song differs by segment - the main part as still sung, according to John Sattler's version, is based on the melody of The Stars and Stripes Forever.

Current lyrics
And now that we're all around the bar

And the Captain's declared it a quorum

We are drinking our way through the night

And we're having the time of our lives

Throw the empties away, start again!

Start again!

For the boys of South Sydney are together

And we'll drink 'til the dawn breaks again!

May the sessions of South Sydney last forever

Up the Rabbitohs!

==== "Botany Road" ====
The Burrow began singing a chant to the tune of "Take Me Home, Country Roads" during the club's resurgence in the 2010s, generally reserving this chant for when victory was assured within 5 minutes of full time.

Flags, banners and scarves bearing "Botany Road" are found throughout South Sydney's supporters at games, referencing the eponymous road that runs through the heart of the South Sydney geographical area.

The song is now an iconic part of the Rabbitohs fan experience, especially during rivalry and Finals Series games. The early repetitions are normally sung at a slow and deliberate pace a capella, with the pace increasing closer to full time and supporters clapping along as the time runs down.

Lyrics
Take me home, Botany Road

To the place I belong

Back to Redfern, South Sydney

Take me home, Botany Road!

==== Other club songs ====
===== The Burrow chants =====
The Burrow have numerous Football chants, both in support of the club and its players as well as against rivals. Some of the most prominent songs and chants, as found in their songbooks, include "South Sydney 'Til I Die", "Rabbitohs", the aforementioned "Botany Road" and several player-based songs, including a version of Whole Again in appreciation of Damien Cook.

The Burrow also gather in their bay to sing their own version of Under the Southern Cross I Stand after Rabbitohs victories, adapted from the Australian national cricket team.

===== Fightback-era songs =====
During the club's exile, numerous supporters of the club contributed songs to raise awareness of their plight and to serve as a fundraiser through the sale of "The Glory of South Sydney"The Glory of South Sydney (Laughing Outlaw Records) - Fightback-era CD CD and VHS.

Allan Caswell and Mark Egan penned "Souths Can Stand Alone", which was performed at several fundraisers and protests. The song claims "if they dump South Sydney, they're dumping Rugby League" and thanks George Piggins for his efforts. A music video featuring a montage of South Sydney moments and heroes was included on the VHS version.Souths Can Stand Alone

Caswell himself became a prominent figure in the campaign, creating several satirical or parody versions of well-known songs, including the club's own "Glory Glory", in protest of News Corp Australia and the National Rugby League's decision to exclude South Sydney from the 2000 and future seasons.

Other contributions included "Glory in their Eyes", a song by John Maclean that touches on the long period since Souths' last premiership and the struggle of long-time Souths supporters having to accept the loss of their club, "Rabbitohs" by Daniel Lissing which concludes with the line "South Sydney marches on" in defiance of the club's exclusion, as well as "Calling All Rabbits" which was constructed from commentary and news soundbytes relating to famous moments on-field, the fight to remain in and return to NRL competition and the like.

===== Other songs =====
One of the more famous South Sydney inspired songs in recent years is "The Day John Sattler Broke His Jaw" by Perry Keyes and later covered by The Whitlams and the Black Stump Band, referencing not only the famous heroics of John Sattler in the 1970 Grand Final, but also life in 1970s Australia and inner-city Sydney. The song's chorus incorporates Frank Hyde's famous "if it's high enough, if it's long enough, it's straight between the posts" commentary.

A Rabbitohs fan covered Eddie Vedder's song "All the Way", adapting the original's references to the Chicago Cubs' century-long struggle to win its next World Series to South Sydney's exclusion and long premiership drought, and the ending of that drought in 2014. The Cubs would win its first World Series since 1908 (also the year Souths participated and won in the inaugural NSWRFL competition) in 2016.

Several supporters have written songs of their own, occasionally garnering some interest within the community.

Pre-game, Souths often have a hype package put together as well as team lineups presented to music. Previous choices for these have included "Cochise", "Kryptonite" and "Hail to the King", often interpolated with the "South Sydney" chant just prior to the entrance of the players.

== Kit sponsors and manufacturers ==
Year	Kit manufacturer	Main shirt sponsor	Back sponsors	Sleeve sponsors	Shorts sponsors
1977–1978	Classic Sportswear	VIP Insurance	—	—	—
1978–1980	Classic Sportswear	KLG Sparkplugs	—	—	—
1981–1983	Classic Sportswear	100 Pipers Scotch	—	—	—
1984–1985	Classic Sportswear	Ignis Refrigerators	—	—	—
1986–1991	Classic Sportswear	Smith's Crisps		—	—
1992–1994	Classic Sportswear	Northwest Airlines		Amiga Computers	—
1995–1997	Classic Sportswear	Canon		Canon	—
1998	Classic Sportswear	— Proposed: Souths Juniors (rejected by NRL)		—	—
1999	Classic Sportswear	Downtown Duty Free		RSL COM	—
2002	International Sports Clothing	TV Week		Arrive Alive	—
2003	International Sports Clothing	Allight		Arrive Alive	Linddales Personnel
2004	International Sports Clothing	Allight		Arrive Alive	Linddales Personnel Hopeshore
2005	International Sports Clothing	Real Insurance/Cinderella Man (select fixtures)	Real Insurance	Arrive Alive	Linddales Personnel Westpoint
2006	International Sports Clothing	Real Insurance	Real Insurance/Glen Alpine Properties	Arrive Alive	BBX Bettaplex
2007	International Sports Clothing	Firepower (home)/High Concept (away) Placement alternated on back/sleeves			Virgin Blue
2008	International Sports Clothing	National Australia Bank (home)/De'Longhi (away) Placement alternated on back		Trivest	Virgin Blue
2009–2010	International Sports Clothing	National Australia Bank (home)/De'Longhi (away) Placement alternated on back		State of Play (film)	Virgin Blue
2011	International Sports Clothing	Star City (home)/De'Longhi (away) Placement alternated on back		V8 Supercars	Kenwood
2012–2013	International Sports Clothing	Star City/The Star (home)/De'Longhi (away) Placement alternated on back AFEX (sternum)		Kenwood	Alcatel One Touch
2014	International Sports Clothing	Crown Resorts/Fujitsu		Fujitsu	Alcatel One Touch
2015–2017	International Sports Clothing	Crown Resorts/Fujitsu		Crown Resorts	Alcatel One Touch
2018	International Sports Clothing	Fujitsu/Crown Resorts		Fujitsu	PlayUp
2019	International Sports Clothing	Aqualand/Alcatel Zoom (sternum)	Safe2Pay TCL/Aqualand	—	PlayUp
2020	International Sports Clothing	Aqualand/Alcatel Zoom (sternum)	Safe2Pay(R1-2)/Wotif(R3-) TCL/Aqualand	Crown Resorts	MenulogHostplus
2021	Classic Sportswear	Aqualand/TCL Zoom (sternum)	Menulog/TCL(Home)/Aqualand(Away)	Crown Resorts	Ingenia Holiday Parks
2022	Classic Sportswear	MG Motor/Wotif (sternum)	Menulog/Aqualand	Crown Resorts	Ingenia Holiday Parks
2023	Classic Sportswear	MG Motor/Wotif (sternum)	Menulog/Aqualand	Crown Resorts	Ingenia Holiday Parks
2024	Classic Sportswear	MG Motor/Wotif (sternum)	Menulog/Aqualand	Ingenia Holiday Parks	

== Rivalries ==
A book, The Book of Feuds, chronicling the rivalries of the Rabbitohs with its NRL competitors was written by Mark Courtney at the instigation of Russell Crowe. It has been used as a motivational tool before Souths matches and was later released on sale to the public.

=== Main ===
Sydney Roosters – South Sydney and its fans have built up rivalries with other clubs, particularly the Sydney Roosters (Eastern Suburbs), the only other remaining foundation club. While South Sydney were historically strongly working class, the Roosters were viewed by South's supporters as ‘Silvertails’ - supported by upper class folk from Sydney's Eastern suburbs.

South Sydney and the Roosters share inner-Sydney territory, resulting in a strong rivalry since 1908 when Souths beat Eastern Suburbs in the first grand final 14–12. Games between the neighbouring foundation clubs have since formed part of the oldest "local derby" in the competition.

The rivalry increased further after 1950 due to conflict between junior territories and since the 1970s escalated once more as both clubs drew key players away from each other (Souths lost internationals Ron Coote, Elwyn Walters and Jim Morgan to Eastern Suburbs from its last era of premiership winning teams, whilst more recently Souths lured key forwards Bryan Fletcher, Peter Cusack and centre Shannon Hegarty away from the Roosters 2002 premiership winning side) and later Michael Crocker. Other players to run out for both clubs include Ashley Harrison, Luke Keary, Angus Crichton, Daniel Suluka-Fifita and Latrell Mitchell. In round 1, 2010, South Sydney and Roosters became the first clubs to play 200 matches against each other. The Sydney Roosters 36–10 victory put the ledger at 105 games won by South Sydney, 90 by the Roosters (Eastern Suburbs) and 5 drawn.

In 2014, Souths defeated the Sydney Roosters in the preliminary final to reach its first grand final in 43 years. In 2018, the Sydney Roosters defeated Souths 12–4 in the preliminary final at Allianz Stadium which was the last game to be played at the venue. The crowd of 44,380 was also a ground record. In 2019, the two clubs met in the qualifying final which was played at the Sydney Cricket Ground. South Sydney had beaten the Sydney Roosters only a week prior in the final game of the regular season but in the qualifying final, the Sydney Roosters won the match 30–6 in a dominant display.

In 2020, the Sydney Roosters managed to record a victory over South Sydney 28–12 in round 3. In the final round of the 2020 NRL season, Souths defeated the Sydney Roosters 60–8. This was the biggest win South Sydney had ever recorded over its rivals eclipsing the previous score set in 1952 when Souths defeated Eastern Suburbs 52–0.

In 2022, South Sydney had declared the club wanted to leave Stadium Australia and make the new Sydney Football Stadium as their home ground. Roosters CEO Nick Politis said to Fox Sports “I’ve heard other people say they want to play there because it’s their home, The point is we’ve been there since 1928. We started with the old sports ground and then 30 years with the old [Sydney Football] Stadium, Nobody else has played there. For another club to say we want to go there because it’s our home, it’s not their home. The Roosters are the only people that belong there. It’s our true home and it’s very sacred". Despite Politis' claims, the South Sydney club had used the Sydney Sports Ground as a home ground before Eastern Suburbs and the two clubs often ground shared for the first 30 years of its existence at the venue.

In the 2022 elimination final between the South Sydney and the Sydney Roosters, seven players were sin binned, setting a record for the most in an NRL-era game.

In the last round of the 2023 NRL season, the Sydney Roosters defeated South Sydney 26–12 to end their season and deny them a finals spot. Before the match started both sides knew whoever lost the game would miss out on the finals.

In round 3 of the 2024 NRL season, the Sydney Roosters recorded their second biggest win over South Sydney since 1908 beating them 48-6. In round 2 of the 2026 NRL season, South Sydney winger Alex Johnston broke Ken Irvine's long-standing try scoring record in the NRL during their match against the Sydney Roosters. This sparked a pitch invasion by supporters of both clubs. In the final round of the 2026 regular season, South Sydney defeated the Sydney Roosters 50-20 in a match where the Sydney Roosters rested most of their players before the finals. The match also saw Jai Arrow make his 100th appearance for South Sydney just before the start of play. Arrow had been diagnosed with Motor Neurone Disease earlier that year.

To celebrate the rivalry, South Sydney and the Sydney Roosters play for the Ron Coote Cup annually.

=== Major ===
St George Dragons and St George Illawarra Dragons – The long-standing rivalry against St. George results in the annual Charity Shield match, originally played against the original St. George Dragons and now (since the joint venture formed with Illawarra Steelers) played against the current team, St. George Illawarra.

South Sydney and St. George have met several times in grand finals prior to the joint-venture and being the north-eastern neighbours of St. George, had many fierce encounters. In 2001, South Sydney chairman and club legend George Piggins said there would be no chance of the Charity Shield being revived if Souths were to be included back into the NRL saying "The Dragons: They sold us out". This was in reference to St. George signing an affidavit at the time which included that it would be detrimental if Souths were returned to the competition.

Balmain Tigers – From 1908–1999, South Sydney had a fierce rivalry with Balmain. The rivalry with Balmain began in 1909 when both teams agreed to boycott the final which was being held as curtain raiser to a Kangaroos v Wallabies match. As agreed, Balmain did not turn up. However, Souths did turn up and were officially awarded the Premiership when it kicked off to an empty half of the field.

South Sydney would later meet Balmain in the 1916 premiership final which Balmain won 5–3. In 1924, Balmain and Souths met in the grand final which is also the lowest scoring grand final in NSWRL/NRL History. Balmain ran out 3-0 winners with the match only seeing one try. In 1939, Balmain and Souths met once more in the grand final with Balmain winning 33–4. In the 1969 NSWRFL season enmity was again fueled between the clubs with Balmain's controversial (Note: Balmain players feigned injury in order to slow down the game, disrupt Souths attacking momentum and run-down the clock to full-time.) victory against South Sydney in the grand final that year.

=== Minor ===
Manly-Warringah Sea Eagles – South Sydney first met Manly-Warringah in the 1951 NSWRFL season's Grand Final. South Sydney would win the match 42-14, which, as of 2022, is the highest scoring grand final in NSWRL/NRL history. Souths would then meet in the 1968 and 1970 grand finals, which South Sydney both won.

Manly have, since 1970, purchased many of Souths' star players including John O'Neill, Ray Branighan, Ian Roberts, (Note: Key Souths players purchased by Manly included internationals John O'Neill, Ray Branighan, Elwyn Walters, Mark Carroll, Terry Hill, Jim Serdaris and Ian Roberts and other stars such as Bob Moses, Tom Mooney and Craig Field.) and more recently Dylan Walker.

Canterbury-Bankstown Bulldogs – A more recent feud that primarily developed in the years 2014 and 2015, following the 2014 NRL Grand Final and a controversial Good Friday match. Canterbury were also Grand Finalists in 1967 with South Sydney prevailing 12−10. Annually, South Sydney and Canterbury-Bankstown compete in the Good Friday game, competing for the Good Friday Cup.

== Players ==
=== Current squad ===
South Sydney Rabbitohs 2026 squad
Top 30 squad - 2026 NRL season			Supplementary list	Coaching staff
Euan Aitken – SR; Tallis Duncan – SR; Adam Elliott – LK; David Fifita – SR; Thomas Fletcher – SR; Bronson Garlick – HK; Jonah Glover – HB; Campbell Graham – WG, CE; Moala Graham-Taufa – WG; Jye Gray – FB	Lachlan Hubner – LK; Jamie Humphreys – HB; Alex Johnston – WG; Sean Keppie – PR; Keaon Koloamatangi – PR; Edward Kosi – WG; Liam Le Blanc – PR; Peter Mamouzelos – HK; Max McCarthy – SR; Latrell Mitchell – CE	Tyrone Munro – WG; Cameron Murray (c) – LK; Brandon Smith – HK; Jayden Sullivan – HB, FE; Isaiah Tass – WG, CE; Tevita Tatola – PR; Cody Walker (vc) – FE; Ashton Ward – HB; Jack Wighton – CE	Salesi Ataata – PR; Matt Humphries – HB; Elijah Keung – PR; Talanoa Penitani – CE; Latrell Siegwalt – CE; Nazareth Taua – SR; Extended squad: Bayleigh Bentley-Hape – WG; Matthew Dufty – FB; John Radel – PR	Head coach: Wayne Bennett; Assistant coaches: Ben Hornby; Steve Antonelli; John Sutton (Development); Trent Elkin (Head of Performance); Legend: (c) Captain(s); (vc) Vice-captain(s); Updated: 22 November 2026; Source(s): Rabbitohs squad

=== Notable players ===
==== The Magnificent XIII (2002) ====
In 2002, on the Rabbitohs' readmission to the competition, The Magnificent XIII, a team consisting of great South Sydney players over the years was selected by a panel of rugby league journalists and former Souths players and coaches. The team consists of 17 players (four being reserves) and a coach representing the South Sydney Rabbitohs Football Club from 1908 through to 2002.

South Sydney Rabbitohs – The Magnificent XIII
Starting XIII	Reserves	Coaching staff
1 Clive Churchill (c) – FB; 2 Harold Horder – WG; 3 Ray Branighan – CE; 4 Paul Sait – CE; 5 Ian Moir – WG; 6 Alf Blair – FE; 7 Bob Grant – HB; 8 John Sattler – PR; 9 George Piggins – HK; 10 John O'Neill – PR; 11 Jack Rayner – SR; 12 Bob McCarthy – SR; 13 Ron Coote – LK	14 Terry Fahey; 15 Ziggy Niszczot; 16 Elwyn Walters; 17 George Treweek	Head coach: Bernie Purcell; Legend: (c) Captain(s); (vc) Vice-captain(s); Updated: 22 November 2026; Source(s):

==== Dream Team (2004) ====
The Rabbitohs announced the South Sydney Dream Team at a gala dinner held on 29 July 2004, at the Westin Hotel in Sydney. 17 players were selected in position as well as a coach, to represent the South Sydney Football Club from 1908 through to 2004. The team was selected by a group of rugby league experts, historians and Rabbitohs fans through a public vote.

South Sydney Rabbitohs – Dream Team 2004
Starting XIII	Reserves	Coaching staff
1 Clive Churchill – FB; 2 Harold Horder – WG; 3 Herb Gilbert – CE; 4 Paul Sait – CE; 5 Ian Moir – WG; 6 Jimmy Lisle – FE; 7 Bob Grant – HB; 8 John Sattler (c) – PR; 9 Elwyn Walters – HK; 10 John O'Neill – PR; 11 George Treweek – SR; 12 Bob McCarthy – SR; 13 Ron Coote – LK	14 Greg Hawick; 15 Ray Branighan; 16 Ian Roberts; 17 Les Cowie	Head coach: Jack Rayner; Legend: (c) Captain(s); (vc) Vice-captain(s); Updated: 29 July 2004; Source(s):

== Season summaries ==
=== NSWRFL (1908-1994) ===
Season	Ladder position	Result
1908	1st	Premiers
1909	1st	Premiers
1910	2nd	Runner-up
1911	3rd	Finals
1912	4th	
1913	3rd	
1914	1st	Premiers
1915	4th	
1916	2nd	Grand final
1917	2nd	
1918	1st	Premiers
1919	6th	
1920	2nd	
1921	5th	
1922	4th	
1923	2nd	Grand final
1924	2nd	Grand final
1925	1st	Premiers
1926	1st	Premiers
1927	1st	Premiers
1928	3rd	Premiers
1929	1st	Premiers
1930	3rd	Semi final
1931	2nd	Premiers
1932	1st	Premiers
1933	3rd	Semi final
1934	4th	Semi final
1935	2nd	Grand final
1936	7th	
1937	2nd	
1938	2nd	Semi final
1939	4th	Grand final
1940	6th	
1941	7th	
1942	5th	
1943	5th	
1944	4th	Semi final
1945	8th	Wooden spoon
1946	8th	Wooden spoon
1947	7th	
1948	7th	
1949	1st	Grand final
1950	1st	Premiers
1951	1st	Premiers
1952	3rd	Grand final
1953	1st	Premiers
1954	2nd	Premiers
1955	4th	Premiers
1956	3rd	Preliminary final
1957	3rd	Preliminary final
1958	8th	
1959	6th	
1960	8th	
1961	7th	
1962	10th	Wooden spoon
1963	9th	
1964	5th	
1965	4th	Grand final
1966	6th	
1967	2nd	Premiers
1968	1st	Premiers
1969	1st	Grand final
1970	1st	Premiers
1971	2nd	Premiers
1972	4th	Semi final
1973	7th	
1974	5th	Qualifying final
1975	12th	Wooden spoon
1976	10th	
1977	11th	
1978	7th	
1979	9th	
1980	5th	Qualifying final
1981	9th	
1982	6th	
1983	8th	
1984	5th	Semi final
1985	9th	
1986	2nd	Semi final
1987	5th	Semi final
1988	8th	
1989	1st	Preliminary final
1990	16th	Wooden spoon
1991	14th	
1992	14th	
1993	14th	
1994	9th	

=== ARL (1995-1997) ===
Season	Ladder position	Finish
1995	18th	
1996	19th	
1997	11th	

=== NRL (1998–present) ===
Season	Ladder	Finish
1998	18th	
1999	12th	
2000	Excluded from competition	
2001	Excluded from competition	
2002	14th	
2003	15th	Wooden spoon
2004	15th	Wooden spoon
2005	13th	
2006	15th	Wooden spoon
2007	7th	Semi finals
2008	14th	
2009	10th	
2010	9th	
2011	10th	
2012	3rd	Preliminary final
2013	2nd	Preliminary final
2014	3rd	Premiers
2015	7th	Elimination final
2016	12th	
2017	12th	
2018	3rd	Preliminary final
2019	3rd	Preliminary final
2020	6th	Preliminary final
2021	3rd	Grand final
2022	7th	Preliminary final
2023	9th	
2024	16th	
2025	14th	
2026	6th	Elimination final

== Club honours ==
Premierships
Competition	Level	Wins	Years won
NSWRFL/ARL/NRL	First Grade	21	1908, 1909, 1914, 1918, 1925, 1926, 1927, 1928, 1929, 1931, 1932, 1950, 1951, 1953, 1954, 1955, 1967, 1968, 1970, 1971, 2014
NSW Cup	Second Grade	21	1913, 1914, 1917, 1923, 1924, 1925, 1926, 1927, 1929, 1931, 1932, 1934, 1943, 1945, 1952, 1953, 1956, 1966, 1968, 1983, 2023
Jersey Flegg Cup	Under 21s	9	1962, 1964, 1966, 1967, 1968, 1969, 1972, 1978, 2019
S. G. Ball Cup	Under 18s	10	1965, 1969, 1974, 1975, 1976, 1979, 1980, 1986, 1994, 1998
Harold Matthews Cup	Under 16s	1	1974
NSWRL Women's	Women's	2	1996, 1997

Other titles and honours
Competition	Level	Wins	Years won
World Club Challenge	World Championship	1	2015
State Championship	Second Grade	1	2023
NRL Nines	Pre season	1	2015
Ron Coote Cup	First Grade	9	2009, 2013, 2014, 2016, 2018, 2019, 2020, 2021, 2022
Charity Shield	Pre season	24	1984, 1988, 1989, 1990, 1991, 1992, 1999, 2002, 2005, 2006, 2008, 2009, 2010, 2013, 2014, 2015, 2016, 2017, 2018, 2019, 2020, 2021, 2023, 2024

Finishing positions
Competition	Level	Wins	Years won
NSWRFL/ARL/NRL	Minor premiership (J.J.Giltinan Shield)	17	1908, 1909, 1914, 1918, 1925, 1926, 1927, 1929, 1932, 1949, 1950, 1951, 1953, 1968, 1969, 1970, 1989
NSWRFL/ARL/NRL	Runner up	14	1910, 1916, 1917, 1920, 1923, 1924, 1935, 1937, 1939, 1949, 1952, 1965, 1969, 2021
NSWRFL/ARL/NRL	Wooden spoons	8	1945, 1946, 1962, 1975, 1990, 2003, 2004, 2006

== Individual awards ==
=== Club Best & Fairest ===
The George Piggins Medal is the award given to the Rabbitohs player determined to have been the "best and fairest" throughout an NRL season. The inaugural winner of the award in 2003 was Bryan Fletcher. In 2013, John Sutton and Greg Inglis became the first joint winners of the award.

==== George Piggins Medal (first grade) ====
Season	Player	Position
2003	Bryan Fletcher	Second-row
2004	Ashley Harrison	Lock
2005	Peter Cusack	Prop
2006	David Fa'alogo	Second-row
2007	Roy Asotasi	Prop
2008	Luke Stuart	Prop
2009	John Sutton	Five eighth
2010	Issac Luke	Hooker
2011	Nathan Merritt	Wing
2012	John Sutton (2)	Five eighth
2013	John Sutton (3)	Five eighth
2013	Greg Inglis	Fullback
2014	Sam Burgess	Lock
2015	Greg Inglis (2)	Fullback
2016	Sam Burgess (2)	Lock
2017	Sam Burgess (3)	Lock
2018	Damien Cook	Hooker
2019	Damien Cook (2)	Hooker
2020	Cody Walker	Five eighth
2021	Cody Walker (2)	Five eighth
2022	Junior Tatola	Prop
2023	Campbell Graham	Centre
2024	Jack Wighton	Five eighth
2025	Jai Arrow	Utility forward
2026	Cameron Murray	Lock

=== Clive Churchill Medal ===
The Clive Churchill medal is awarded annually to the player adjudged best on ground in the grand final.

- Clive Churchill (1954)*
- Jack Rayner (1955)*
- Eric Simms (1968)*
- Bob Grant (1970)*
- Ron Coote (1971)*
- Sam Burgess (2014)

* Retrospective medals

=== Dally M Award Winners ===
==== Dally M Medal ====
Awarded annually to the player of the year over the course of the first grade regular season.

- Robert Laurie (1980)

==== Rookie of the Year ====
- Jim Sedaris (1989)
- Chris Sandow (2008)
- Adam Reynolds (2012)
- George Burgess (2013)

==== Coach of the Year ====
- Anthony Seibold (2018)

==== Team of the Year ====
- Robert Laurie (Five-eighth, 1980)
- Nathan Gibbs (Second row, 1980)
- Mick Pattison (Five-eighth, 1981)
- Ian Roberts (Prop, 1987)
- Phil Blake (Five-eighth, 1989)
- Matt Parsons (Prop, 1999)
- Greg Inglis (Fullback, 2013)
- Sam Burgess (Lock, 2014)
- Damien Cook (Hooker, 2018)
- Cameron Murray (Lock, 2019)
- Cody Walker (Five-eighth, 2021)
- Alex Johnston (Wing, 2022)

=== NRL Immortals ===
- Clive Churchill (1981)
- Ron Coote (2024)

=== NRL Hall of Fame ===
The NRL Hall of Fame recognises the contribution to rugby league in Australia since 1908.

- Clive Churchill (2002)
- Harold Horder (2004)
- Ron Coote (2005)
- George Treweek (2006)
- Harry Wells (2007)
- Cec Blinkhorn (2018)
- Billy Cann (2018)
- Herb Gilbert (2018)
- Howard Hallett (2018)
- Brian Hambly (2018)
- Bob McCarthy (2018)
- John O'Neill (2018)
- John Sattler (2018)
- Benny Wearing (2018)
- Sam Burgess (2024)
- Greg Inglis (2024)
- Benji Marshall (2024)
- Wayne Bennett (2024, coach)

=== Other distinctions ===
- Nathan Merritt (2006, Ken Irvine Medal)
- Nathan Merritt (2011, Ken Irvine Medal)
- Chris Sandow (2011, Top Point Scorer)
- Greg Inglis (2013, Provan-Summons Medal)
- Damien Cook (2018, Provan-Summons Medal)
- Adam Reynolds (2020, Top Point Scorer)
- Alex Johnston (2020, Ken Irvine Medal)
- Alex Johnston (2021, Ken Irvine Medal)
- Alex Johnston (2022, Ken Irvine Medal)
- Tyrone Munro (2024, Provan-Summons Medal)
- Alex Johnston (2026, Ken Irvine Medal)
- Jai Arrow (2026, Provan-Summons Medal)

== Statistics and records ==
South Sydney are the most successful club in terms of honours and individual player achievements in the history of NSW rugby league.

The club achievements include:

- The Rabbitohs have won the most first grade premierships (21) during the history of elite rugby league competition in Australia, in addition to the most reserve grade (Note: Up until 2002, the second division of rugby league in New South Wales was Reserve Grade/Presidents Cup/First Division Premiers; since then, it has been the NSWRL Premier League.) premierships (21).
- The club has the distinction of being the only team to win a premiership in its inaugural season (1908).
- The club also has the distinction of scoring the most points (42), most tries (8) and most goals (9) in a grand final, all achieved against Manly in 1951.
- South Sydney's 1925 first grade side is one of six New South Wales sides to ever go through a season undefeated. The club won the premiership in all three grades in 1925, a feat only repeated on three other occasions (Balmain Tigers in 1915 and 1916 and St George Dragons in 1963).
- In 2008, the Rabbitohs equalled the second biggest comeback in Australian Rugby League history. After being down 28–4 after 53 minutes against the North Queensland Cowboys, the Rabbitohs won the match 29–28.

The club's players have also achieved some notable individual game and point scoring milestones:

- John Sutton holds the record for the most first grade games for the club, having played 336 matches between 2004 and 2019.
- Jack Rayner holds the individual record of the most grand final successes as a captain (5) and coach (5) achieved between 1950 and 1955.
- Adam Reynolds holds the club record for the most points, tallying 1896 points between 2012 and 2021.
- Eric Simms scored 265 points on his own for South Sydney in 1969 and this tally remains unsurpassed by any other player at the club.
- Eric Simms still holds a club and competition record for the most goals (112 goals and 19 field goals) in a season, most career field goals (86) and most field goals in a game (5).
- Johnny Graves' tally of 29 points in a match against Eastern Suburbs in 1952 remains the club record for the most individual points in a match. Had this feat been scored as it is today it would have stood at 32 points.
- Alex Johnston is the only player to score 30 tries in a single season in the NRL era. He achieved the feat in both the 2021 and 2022 seasons, the only player in Australian rugby league history to complete the feat twice.
- During his career Bob McCarthy scored 100 tries for the club, the most by a forward.
- Alex Johnston equalled the South Sydney club record of 5 tries in a 2017 match against Penrith at ANZ Stadium in a 42–14 win, joining greats such as Nathan Merritt, Harold Horder, Johnny Graves and Ian Moir. Johnston went on to score another 5 tries against the Sydney Roosters in a 60–8 win in the final round of the 2020 season.
- Alex Johnston passed Nathan Merritt's all-time try scoring record in Souths win 44–18 against Wests Tigers in round 12 of the 2022 season, with 166 tries as of the end of the 2022 season.

== Head-to-head records ==
Opponent	Played	Won	Drawn	Lost	Win %
Gold Coast Titans	24	18	0	6	75.00
Wests Tigers	46	28	0	18	60.87
Dolphins	5	3	0	2	60.00
Parramatta Eels	143	79	3	61	55.24
St George-Illawarra Dragons	44	24	0	20	54.54
Sydney Roosters	257	131	6	120	50.97
North Queensland Cowboys	42	21	1	20	50.00
Warriors	42	21	0	21	50.00
Penrith Panthers	106	53	2	51	50.00
Manly-Warringah Sea Eagles	167	83	1	83	49.70
Canterbury-Bankstown Bulldogs	182	86	6	90	47.25
Cronulla Sharks	106	47	3	56	44.34
Canberra Raiders	64	25	0	39	39.06
Newcastle Knights	49	19	0	30	38.78
Brisbane Broncos	53	17	1	35	32.08
Melbourne Storm	43	7	0	36	16.28

=== Defunct teams ===
Opponent	Played	Won	Drawn	Lost	Win%
Cumberland	1	1	0	0	100.00%
Northern Eagles	1	1	0	0	100.00%
University	31	30	1	0	98.38%
Annandale	21	19	1	1	92.85%
Newcastle (1908–09)	5	4	0	1	80.00%
South Queensland	4	3	0	1	64.70%
Glebe	42	27	0	15	64.28%
North Sydney	175	104	6	65	61.14%
Newtown	153	90	7	56	61.11%
Western Suburbs	182	106	5	71	59.61%
Balmain	178	95	3	80	54.21%
Gold Coast	18	9	1	8	52.77%
Western Reds/Perth	2	1	0	1	50.00%
St George	163	69	2	92	42.94%
Illawarra	31	12	2	17	41.93%
Adelaide	1	0	0	1	0.00%

== See also ==
- List of teams in the NSWRL/ARL/SL/NRL
- List of rugby league clubs in Australia
