= Book of Feuds =

2008 book by Mark Courtney

The Book of Feuds
- Front cover, first edition
- Author: Mark Courtney
- Language: English
- Genre: Sport
- Publication date: 13 March 2008
- Publication place: Australia
- Media type: Print (Paperback)

The Book of Feuds is a book commissioned by South Sydney Rabbitohs co-owner Russell Crowe to chronicle the rivalries of the rugby league club and to be used as a motivational tool. A chapter is dedicated to each of their 15 National Rugby League competitors. It was written by Mark Courtney.

Originally, the book's contents were a secret but later extracts were seen being read by Crowe to the team in the television documentary South Side Story.

== Origins and Themes ==
The Book of Feuds began as a detailed account of Souths' history against their rivals – but a shorter version was created specifically to be read to the players before matches.

The Book of Feuds doubles as both an educational document and a motivational tool. Shortly after the Rabbitohs were readmitted to the competition for the 2002 season the players were asked by Crowe which club had won the most premierships. Of the answers given none of the players knew the correct answer, that it was Souths.

The book's author, Courtney stated that, "It's not done from a bitter perspective, it's done from an envy perspective", when interviewed, "The Book of Feuds is not a bitter book – well, there is occasional bitterness and hatred".

== Readings ==
Crowe and other Souths identities, such as co-captain David Kidwell, who has been out injured, coach Jason Taylor and Courtney have all read excerpts of the book to the players to fire them up before matches. Crowe has delivered the majority of the readings.

== Release ==
The rivalry between the Sydney Roosters and Souths is the longest surviving in the current NRL competition.

Leading up to a 2008 match, the Book was released by the South Sydney Rabbitohs to the public. Inside, the author claims "the Roosters lost their soul" and that "they simply don't have the tradition, the stories or the romance that is South Sydney", an erroneous claim from a club that itself had recently privatized; something the Roosters club has not done. Both Roosters coach Brad Fittler and player Willie Mason added their own views, stating they "hate Souths".
