= Greenstone Financial Services =

Australian insurance brand

- Company type: Private
- Industry: Insurance
- Founded: 2007
- Headquarters: Sydney, New South Wales, Australia
- Area served: Australia, New Zealand, Canada
- Products: Life Insurance, Health Insurance, Property Insurance, Pet Insurance
- Number of employees: 730 (2025)
- Website: www.greenstone.com.au

Greenstone Financial Services (Greenstone) is an insurance distributor founded in 2007 in Sydney, Australia. It specialises in designing, marketing, distributing, and administering personal insurance products, including life, funeral, income protection, pet, home, health, landlords, car, and travel insurance. Greenstone operates in Australia, New Zealand, and Canada. The company distributes insurance products under both proprietary brands and affinity partnerships, using a direct-to-consumer model.

== History ==
Greenstone was established in 2007 as part of the Hollard Insurance Group’s expansion in Australia. In its first year, the company began distributing insurance under the Real Insurance, which later became one of its flagship offerings. In January 2015, Greenstone expanded its portfolio by acquiring Australian Seniors Insurance Agency (trading as Australian Seniors).

In 2016, Canadian institutional investor Caisse de dépôt et placement du Québec (CDPQ) acquired a 44% stake in Greenstone.

Greenstone entered the New Zealand market in early 2019, establishing local operations and launching two market-specific brands: New Zealand Seniors and OneChoice.

In 2021, the Ontario Teachers’ Pension Plan Board (OTPP) acquired a 33.4% stake in the company.

In March 2022, Greenstone acquired Pinnacle Life, a New Zealand-based life insurance provider.

In early 2023, the company expanded into Canada with the launch of two new insurance brands. FiftyUp, developed in partnership with Teachers Life, offers final expenses insurance for Canadians aged 50 and over. North Cover, also backed by Teachers Life, began with final expenses cover and later expanded into life insurance.

== Operations ==
=== Business model ===
Greenstone operates as an insurance distributor, acting as an intermediary between insurance underwriters and consumers. The company uses a direct-to-consumer model, primarily selling insurance products online.

=== Brand portfolio ===
The company operates multiple insurance brands across its three markets:

=== Australia ===
- Real Insurance
- Australian Seniors
- Choosi
- Guardian Insurance
- Kogan Life Insurance
- Buddy Pet Insurance
- RSPCA Pet Insurance
- Guide Dogs Pet Insurance
- Prime Pet Insurance

=== New Zealand ===
- New Zealand Seniors
- OneChoice
- SPCA Pet Insurance

=== Canada ===
- FiftyUp
- North Cover
