= Real Insurance =

Real Insurance is a trading name in Australia of Greenstone Financial Services Pty Ltd (GFS) which acts as the retail agent of The Hollard Insurance Company Pty Ltd for the distribution of a range of its general insurance products, including pet insurance, home and contents, and motor insurance. It also distributes a range of life insurance products underwritten by Hannover Life Re of Australasia Ltd, including life insurance, funeral insurance, income protection insurance and bill insurance.

Under the Real Insurance brand, Hollard issues and/or distributes bike, car, funeral, home and contents, life, pet, and travel insurance.

In 2008, Real Insurance was the first insurance company to offer pay-as-you-drive (PAYD) insurance in Australia, whereby the car insurance premium is reduced for drivers with low kilometres usage. Such drivers can specify in advance the number of kilometres they plan to drive, in return for reduced premiums. Setting the maximum number of kilometres at the start of the policy eliminates the privacy issues inherent in other types of usage-based car insurance, which may require drivers to have a monitoring device installed to track the kilometres they drive.
