= Sydney Football Stadium =

Sydney Football Stadium may refer to:

- Sydney Football Stadium (1988), the original stadium which was demolished in 2019.
- Sydney Football Stadium (2022), the new stadium built on the site of the 1988 stadium.
