= 1914 Great Britain Lions tour =

British national rugby league team tour

- Manager: J. Clifford and J. H. Houghton
- Tour captain(s): Harold Wagstaff
- Top point scorer(s): Alf Wood (97)
- Top try scorer(s): Stan Moorhouse (19)
Summary
P	W	D	L
Total
18	15	0	3
Test match
4	3	0	1
Opponent
P	W	D	L
Australia
3	2	0	1
New Zealand
1	1	0	0

Tour chronology
- Previous tour: 1910
- Next tour: 1920

The 1914 Great Britain Lions tour of Australia and New Zealand was the second ever British national rugby league team or 'Lions' tour of Australasia, where it was winter and matches were played against the Australian and New Zealand national sides, as well as several local teams. The tour repeated the promotional and financial success of the 1910 Great Britain Lions tour of Australasia and became famous for the third and deciding Ashes test, known as the "Rorke's Drift Test" due to a backs-to-the wall British victory against all odds.

== Touring squad ==
At the 1913–14 Northern Rugby Football Union season's conclusion, the following Great Britain squad was assembled by the Northern Rugby Football Union to represent it on the tour of Australasia. The Union's tour manager was John Clifford.

Name	Club	Position	Appearances	Tests	Tries	Goals	Points
Jack Chilcott (Wales)	Huddersfield	Forward	11	3	1	0	3
James Clampitt (England)	Broughton Rangers	Forward	11	1	2	0	6
Douglas Clark (England)	Huddersfield	Forward	6	3	1	0	3
Percy Coldrick (Wales)	Wigan	Forward	10	4	6	0	18
William Davies (Wales)	Leeds	Three-quarter back	13	2	13	2	43
Alfred Francis (Wales)	Hull	Three-quarter back	3	0	6	0	18
Walter Guerin (England)	Hunslet	Forward	8	0	1	14	31
Billy Hall (England)	Oldham	Three-quarter back	12	4	6	0	18
Dave Holland (England)	Oldham	Forward	12	4	7	0	21
Billy Jarman (England)	Leeds	Forward	9	2	3	1	11
Bert Jenkins (Wales)	Wigan	Three-quarter back	10	2	8	0	24
Arthur Johnson (England)	Widnes	Forward	12	2	7	2	25
Fred Longstaff (England)	Huddersfield	Forward	8	2	2	4	14
Stan Moorhouse (England)	Huddersfield	Three-quarter back	10	2	19	0	57
Jack O'Garra (England)	Widnes	Half-back	8	0	5	0	15
Stuart Prosser (Wales)	Halifax	Half-back	8	1	3	0	9
Dick Ramsdale (England)	Wigan	Forward	9	4	1	0	3
Jack Robinson (England)	Rochdale Hornets	Three-quarter back	5	2	4	3	18
Johnny Rogers (Wales)	Huddersfield	Half-back	7	1	2	3	12
Walter Roman (England)	Rochdale Hornets	Forward	7	0	1	0	3
John Smales (England)	Hunslet	Forward	7	0	2	0	6
Fred Smith (England)	Hunslet	Half-back	12	4	2	0	6
Gwyn Thomas (Wales)	Wigan	Full-back	6	1	1	3	9
Harold Wagstaff (c) (England)	Huddersfield	Three-quarter back	13	4	11	4	41
Frank Williams (Wales)	Halifax	Three-quarter back	7	2	7	0	21
Alf Wood (England)	Oldham	Full-back	9	2	1	47	97

== Australia ==
The first leg of the tour was Australia, where the game of rugby league football was in its seventh year since splitting away from rugby union in 1908. the tourists ventured to Adelaide, Melbourne, Ipswich and Bathurst, as well as Sydney, Brisbane and Newcastle.

The Australian team was captained in all three Ashes Tests by North Sydney skipper Sid Deane.

=== Test venues ===
The three Ashes series tests took place at the following venues. All three tests took place in Sydney.

Sydney	Sydney
Royal Agricultural Showground	Sydney Cricket Ground
Capacity: 50,000	Capacity: 60,000

Sunday 24 May	South Australia	0 – 101	Northern Union	Hawthorn Oval, Adelaide
	Tries: Goals:	[ Report]	Tries: William Davies (4), Bert Jenkins (4), Frank Williams (4), Percy Coldrick (2), Billy Jarman (2), Jack Robinson (2), James Clampitt, Dave Holland, Arthur Johnson, John Smales, Alf Wood; Goals: Alf Wood (15); Jack Robinson (1)	Attendance: 2,500

South Australia: J. Lawson, R. Cooksley, O. Howard, E. Dutton, P. Knowles, W. Oldfield, M. Moran, C. Fincham, J. Sorensen, F. Stewart, J. Carr, A. Shuttleworth, P. Jackson. Res – L. Scott

Northern Union: Alf Wood (c), Jack Robinson, William Davies, Bert Jenkins, Frank Williams, Fred Smith, Jack O'Garra, James Clampitt, Billy Jarman, Arthur Johnson, Dave Holland, Percy Coldrick, John Smales

Saturday 6 June	Metropolis	38 – 10	Northern Union	Sydney Cricket Ground, Sydney
	Tries: Harold Horder (2), Sid Deane, Arthur Halloway, Bill Kelly, Ray Norman; Goals: Wally Messenger (9); Field Goals: Howard Hallett (1)	[ Report]	Tries: Dave Holland, Stuart Prosser; Goals: Joseph Guerin (1); Johnny Rogers (1)	Attendance: 50,257; Referee: Tom McMahon Sr.

Metropolis: Howard Hallett, Harold Horder, Sid Deane (c), Bill Kelly, Wally Messenger, Ray Norman, Arthur Halloway, Jack Watkins, Sid Pearce, Con Sullivan, Paddy McCue, Ed Courtney, Frank Burge

Northern Union: Alf Wood, Frank Williams, William Davies (c), Bert Jenkins, Jack Robinson, Stuart Prosser, Johnny Rogers, Joseph Guerin, James Clampitt, Walter Roman, Billy Jarman, Dave Holland, John Smales

Monday 8 June	New South Wales	11 – 3	Northern Union	Sydney Cricket Ground, Sydney
	Tries: Bill Kelly, Ray Norman; Goals: Harold Horder (3); Wally Messenger (1)	[ Report]	Tries: Harold Wagstaff; Goals:	Attendance: 49,000; Referee: Tom McMahon Sr.

NSW: Howard Hallett, Harold Horder, Sid Deane (c), Bill Kelly, Wally Messenger, Ray Norman, Arthur Halloway, Jack Watkins, Sid Pearce, Con Sullivan, Paddy McCue, Ed Courtney, Frank Burge. Res – Charles Fraser

Northern Union: Gwyn Thomas, William Davies, Harold Wagstaff (c), Bert Jenkins, Stan Moorhouse, Billy Hall, Johnny Rogers, Percy Coldrick, Douglas Clark, Arthur Johnson, Billy Jarman, Dave Holland, Jack Chilcott

Saturday 13 June	Queensland	10 – 18	Northern Union	Brisbane Exhibition Ground, Brisbane
	Tries: Herbert McCabe, Charles Scott; Goals: Henry Bolewski (2)	[ Report]	Tries: Alfred Francis (2), Frank Williams (2); Goals: Gwyn Thomas (1); Joseph Guerin (1)	Attendance: 12,000; Referee: C. Turner

Queensland: Mick Bolewski (c), Herbert McCabe, Walter Bolewski, Henry Bolewski, William Beavis, Daniel Rowley, Evan Lewis, Jack Egan, Thomas Dean, Harold Bawden, Charles Scott, William Pritchard, James Adams

Northern Union: Gwyn Thomas, Frank Williams, Harold Wagstaff (c), William Davies, Alfred Francis, Fred Smith, Jack O'Garra, Joseph Guerin, Douglas Clark, Fred Longstaff, Dick Ramsdale, John Smales, Jack Chilcott

Wednesday 17 June	Ipswich	8 – 45	Northern Union	North Ipswich Reserve, Ipswich
	Tries: Goals:	[ Report]	Tries: Alfred Francis (5), Stan Moorhouse (3), Harold Wagstaff (2), Arthur Johnson; Goals: Harold Wagstaff (4); Billy Jarman (1); Arthur Johnson (1)	Attendance: 2,000

Northern Union: Billy Jarman, Stan Moorhouse, Harold Wagstaff (c), Billy Hall, Alfred Francis, Stuart Prosser, Fred Smith, Arthur Johnson, Joseph Guerin, James Clampitt, Walter Roman, Percy Coldrick, Fred Longstaff

Saturday 20 June	Queensland	8 – 22	Northern Union	Brisbane Exhibition Ground, Brisbane
	Tries: Goals: Henry Bolewski (4)	[ Report]	Tries: Stan Moorhouse (2), Percy Coldrick, Billy Hall, Johnny Rogers, Harold Wagstaff; Goals: Fred Longstaff (1); Gwyn Thomas (1)	Attendance: 12,000; Referee: Jack Roche

Queensland: Mick Bolewski (c), Herbert McCabe, John Birkett, Henry Bolewski, William Beavis, Thomas Hennessy, Evan Lewis, Jack Egan, Thomas Dean, Peter Olsen, Charles Scott, William Pritchard, Don Jeffrey

Northern Union: Gwyn Thomas, Frank Williams, Harold Wagstaff (c), Bert Jenkins, Stan Moorhouse, Billy Hall, Johnny Rogers, Percy Coldrick, Douglas Clark, Fred Longstaff, Dick Ramsdale, Billy Jarman, Jack Chilcott

Wednesday 24 June	Newcastle	18 – 35	Northern Union	Newcastle Sports Ground, Newcastle
	Tries: Arthur Baber, J. Coleman, W. Coleman, P. Scully; Goals: W. Coleman (1); J. Maloney (1); P. Scully (1)	[ Report]	Tries: Harold Wagstaff (2), William Davies, Dave Holland, Arthur Johnson, Jack O'Garra, Jack Robinson, John Smales, Fred Smith; Goals: Alf Wood (4)	Attendance: 5,000; Referee: E. Rees

Newcastle: J. Maloney (c), P. Scully, W. Coleman, E. Brien, G. Johns, J. Coleman, F. Bell, F. Grahame, H. Williams, Stan Carpenter, J. Quinn, Arthur Baber, C. Perkins

Northern Union: Alf Wood, Alfred Francis, Harold Wagstaff (c), William Davies, Jack Robinson, Fred Smith, Jack O'Garra, Walter Roman, James Clampitt, Joseph Guerin, Dave Holland, John Smales, Arthur Johnson

=== First test ===
Future Australian Rugby League Hall of Fame inductee Harold Horder was selected to make his Test debut for this match. On the other wing was the only Queenslander selected in the home side, Henry Bolewski. Also selected to debut for his adopted country was New Zealander, Bill Kelly, after whom the trophy contested in the ANZAC Test would be named.

Saturday 27 June

Australia	5 – 23	(United Kingdom) Northern Union
Tries: Ray Norman Goals: Henry Bolewski (1)		Tries: Stan Moorhouse (2); Doug Clark; Dave Holland; Jack Robinson; Goals: Fred Longstaff (2); Jack Robinson (2)

RAS Showground, Sydney
Attendance: 40,000
Referee: Tom McMahon Sr.

Australia	Northern Union

FB	1	Howard Hallett
WG	2	Henry Bolewski
CE	3	Sid Deane (c)
CE	4	Bill Kelly
WG	5	Harold Horder
FE	6	Ray Norman
HB	7	Arthur Halloway
PR	13	Ed Courtney
HK	12	Sandy Pearce
PR	11	Frank Burge
SR	10	Con Sullivan
SR	9	Paddy McCue
LK	8	Jack Watkins
Coach:

FB	1	Billy Jarman
WG	2	Jack Robinson
CE	3	Bert Jenkins
CE	4	Harold Wagstaff (c)
WG	5	Stan Moorhouse
SO	6	Billy Hall
SH	7	Fred Smith
PR	13	Dave Holland
HK	12	Percy Coldrick
PR	11	Dick Ramsdale
SR	10	Jack Chilcott
SR	9	Fred Longstaff
LF	8	Douglas Clark
Coach:

The first test of the 1914 Ashes series was played in Sydney before a crowd of around 40,000. Leeds forward Billy Jarman, making his debut for Great Britain missed a conversion attempt from in front of the posts. Henry Bolewski was the only Queensland player selected in the Australian side.

=== Second test ===
Monday 29 June

Australia	12 – 7	(United Kingdom) Northern Union
Tries: Frank Burge; Charles Fraser; Wally Messenger; Goals: Wally Messenger (3)		Tries: Percy Coldrick Goals: Johnny Rogers (2)

Sydney Cricket Ground, Sydney
Attendance: 55,000
Referee: Tom McMahon Sr.

Australia	Northern Union

FB	1	Howard Hallett
WG	2	Dan Frawley
CE	3	Sid Deane (c)
CE	4	Wally Messenger
WG	5	Bob Tidyman
FE	6	Charles Fraser
HB	7	Arthur Halloway
PR	13	Ed Courtney
HK	12	Sandy Pearce
PR	11	Frank Burge
SR	10	Bob Craig
SR	9	Con Sullivan
LK	8	Billy Cann
Coach:

FB	1	Gwyn Thomas
WG	2	Frank Williams
CE	3	Harold Wagstaff (c)
CE	4	Billy Hall
WG	5	Jack Robinson
SO	6	Johnny Rogers
SH	7	Fred Smith
PR	13	Billy Jarman
HK	12	Dick Ramsdale
PR	11	Percy Coldrick
SR	10	Dave Holland
SR	9	Douglas Clark
LF	8	Jack Chilcott
Coach:

After being humiliated in the first Test, the Australians bounced back to narrowly win the second 12–7 at the Sydney Cricket Ground with Charles Fraser and Frank Burge scoring and Wally Messenger kicking 3 goals.

Thursday 2 July	Western Districts	3 – 42	Northern Union	Bathurst Showgrounds, Bathurst
	Tries: A. Dawson; Goals:	[ Report]	Tries: Billy Hall (3), William Davies (2), Arthur Johnson (2), Jack O'Garra (2); Goals: Joseph Guerin (2); Alf Wood (2)	Attendance: 5,000; Referee: E. Rees

Western Districts: E. Hawke, A. Bassett, A. Dawson, H. Gunn, E. Lockhard, R. Trefrey, Edward Coyne, D. Gander, Arch Moncreiff (c), D. Reece, P. Smith, R. Murphy, D. Haynes

Northern Union: Alf Wood (c), Frank Williams, Billy Hall, William Davies, Jack O'Garra, Stuart Prosser, Johnny Rogers, Walter Roman, James Clampitt, Joseph Guerin, John Smales, Billy Jarman, Arthur Johnson

=== Third test ===
The third and deciding Ashes test had originally been scheduled for Melbourne in August, but the New South Wales Rugby Football League unilaterally rescheduled it for Sydney on 4 July to maximise profits. Melbourne had to wait another 78 years until they hosted their first test, in the Ashes Series of 1992. The British protested that it would be their third test match in seven days and several of their first team were out with injuries, but the NSWRFL got its way. The tourists were instructed by the Northern Union officials to play and do their duty for England.

Saturday 4 July

Australia	6 – 14	(United Kingdom) Northern Union
Tries: Wally Messenger; Sid Deane; Goals:		Tries: William Davies; Arthur Johnson; Goals: Alf Wood (4)

Sydney Cricket Ground
Attendance: 34,420
Referee: Tom McMahon Sr.

Australia	Northern Union

FB	1	Howard Hallett
WG	2	Bob Tidyman
CE	3	Wally Messenger
CE	4	Sid Deane (c)
WG	5	Dan Frawley
FE	6	Charles Fraser
HB	7	Arthur Halloway
PR	13	Ed Courtney
HK	12	Sandy Pearce
PR	11	Frank Burge
SR	10	Con Sullivan
SR	9	Bob Craig
LK	8	Billy Cann
Coach:

FB	1	Alf Wood
WG	2	Frank Williams
CE	3	Harold Wagstaff (c)
CE	4	Billy Hall
WG	5	William Davies
SO	6	Stuart Prosser
SH	7	Fred Smith
PR	13	Jack Chilcott
HK	12	Dick Ramsdale
PR	11	Percy Coldrick
SR	10	Dave Holland
SR	9	Douglas Clark
LF	8	Arthur Johnson
Coach:

Within the first minutes of the match, Great Britain were down a man due to an injury to Frank Williams. Forward Arthur 'Chick' Johnson, the Widnes club's first international representative, was shifted to the wing to take Williams' place. At half time the British were leading 9–3. Ten minutes into the second half, they had lost Douglas Clark and Billy Hall to injuries so were reduced to ten men. 'Chick' Johnson, playing out of position on the wing, then used the unorthodox method of dribbling the ball ahead with his feet to score a try. This lifted his teammates in defence and the British managed to win 14–6.

Saturday 15 August	New South Wales	15 – 21	Northern Union	Melbourne Cricket Ground, Melbourne
	Tries: Arthur Halloway, Sid Pearce, Bob Tidyman; Goals: Albert Burge (3)	[ Report]	Tries: Percy Coldrick, Bert Jenkins, Stan Moorhouse; Goals: Alf Wood (6)	Attendance: 13,000; Referee: Tom McMahon Sr.

NSW: George Challis, Tom Leggo, Bob Tidyman, Charles Fraser, George Bain, Les Cubitt, Arthur Halloway (c), Bob Williams, Sid Pearce, Ed Courtney, Bob Craig, Albert Burge, Frank Burge. Res –

Northern Union: Alf Wood, Stan Moorhouse, Harold Wagstaff (c), Bert Jenkins, William Davies, Billy Hall, Johnny Rogers, Percy Coldrick, James Clampitt, Dick Ramsdale, Fred Longstaff, Jack Chilcott, Arthur Johnson

This game was played on the return leg from New Zealand

== New Zealand ==
Originally scheduled to take place during the Ashes series, the New Zealand leg was postponed until afterwards.

Saturday 11 July	Wellington	7 – 14	Northern Union	Newtown Park, Wellington
	Tries: Goals:	[ Report]	Tries: Jack Chilcott, Billy Hall, Joseph Houghton, Gwyn Thomas; Goals: Joseph Guerin (1)	Attendance: 5,000

Northern Union: Gwyn Thomas, Joseph Houghton, Billy Hall, William Davies, Jack O'Garra, Stuart Prosser, Fred Smith, Joseph Guerin, Billy Jarman, Jack Chilcott, John Smales, Walter Roman, James Clampitt

Saturday 18 July	Hawke's Bay	7 – 30	Northern Union	Nelson Park, Napier
	Tries: Goals:	[ Report]	Tries: Goals:	Attendance: 4,000

Thursday 23 July	Taranaki	11 – 43	Northern Union	Taumata Park, Eltham
	Tries: Goals:	[ Report]	Tries: Goals:	Attendance: 2,000

Saturday 25 July	Auckland	12 – 34	Northern Union	Auckland Domain, Auckland
	Tries: Goals:	[ Report]	Tries: Dave Holland (2), Stan Moorhouse (2), Percy Coldrick, Billy Hall, Dick Ramsdale, Johnny Rogers; Goals: Alf Wood (5)	Attendance: 13,000

Auckland: Tom Cross, Charles Woolley, Karl Ifwersen, Edward Fox, Thomas McClymont, Arthur Hardgrave, Charles Webb, Charlie Savory, Joe Bennett, Stan Walters, Bob Mitchell, Harold Hayward, Jim Clark

Northern Union: Alf Wood, Stan Moorhouse, Billy Hall, Bert Jenkins, William Davies, Johnny Rogers, Fred Smith, Dick Ramsdale, Arthur Johnson, Jack Chilcott, Fred Longstaff, Percy Coldrick, Dave Holland

Northern Union defeated Auckland 34–12 in front of 13,000 fans. The gate earned the Auckland Rugby League NZ£650.

Thursday 30 July	Wanganui	12 – 57	Northern Union	Cooks Gardens, Whanganui
	Tries: Goals:	[ Report]	Tries: Bert Jenkins (3), Fred Longstaff (2), Stan Moorhouse (2), Stuart Prosser (2), Harold Wagstaff (2), James Clampitt, Joseph Guerin; Goals: Alf Wood (9)	Attendance: 3,000

Northern Union: Alf Wood, Stan Moorhouse, Harold Wagstaff (c), Bert Jenkins, William Davies, Jack O'Garra, Stuart Prosser, Dick Ramsdale, Joseph Guerin, James Clampitt, Fred Longstaff, Percy Coldrick, Walter Roman

Saturday 1 August

New Zealand	13 – 16	(United Kingdom) Northern Union
Tries: Billy Wilson (2); Vic Banks Goals: Karl Ifwersen (2)		Tries: Stan Moorhouse (2); Arthur Johnson; William Davies; Goals: Alf Wood (2)

Auckland Domain, Auckland
Attendance: 15,000
Referee: A. Ferguson (New Zealand)

New Zealand	Northern Union

FB	1	Arthur Hardgrave
WG	2	Karl Ifwersen
CE	3	Stan Weston
CE	4	George Bradley (c)
WG	5	Billy Wilson
FE	6	Frank Barclay
HB	7	Bill Bussell
PR	13	Charles Savory
HK	12	Ernest Button
PR	11	James Parker
SR	10	Vic Banks
SR	9	Bob Mitchell
LK	8	Stan Walters
Coach:

FB	1	Alf Wood
WG	2	William Davies
CE	3	Bert Jenkins
CE	4	Harold Wagstaff (c)
WG	5	Stan Moorhouse
SO	6	Billy Hall
SH	7	Fred Smith
PR	13	Dave Holland
HK	12	Percy Coldrick
PR	11	Dick Ramsdale
SR	10	Fred Longstaff
SR	9	Arthur Johnson
LF	8	James Clampitt
Coach:

New Zealand lost the sole Test match 13–16. Billy Wilson scored two tries, Vic Banks scored one and Karl Ifwersen kicked two goals.
