= Douglas Clark (rugby league) =

English rugby league footballer and heavyweight wrestling World champion

Dougie Clark
- Godfrey Phillips Cigarette card featuring Clark

Personal information
- Full name: Douglas Clark
- Born: 2 May 1891 Ellenborough, England
- Died: 1 February 1951 (aged 59) Birkby, Huddersfield, England

Playing information
- Position: Forward
Club
Years	Team	Pld	T	G	FG	P
1909–27	Huddersfield	485	99	0	0	297
Representative
Years	Team	Pld	T	G	FG	P
1910–30	Cumberland	31	3	0	0	9
1911–20	Great Britain	11	3	0	0	9
1912–25	England	6	5	0	0	15

Douglas "Duggy" Clark MM (2 May 1891 – 1 February 1951) was an English rugby league footballer, wrestler and World War I veteran. A Rugby Football League Hall of Fame inductee, he played for Huddersfield, Cumberland, England and the Great Britain national side, as a forward. Clark helped Huddersfield to three Challenge Cups and seven Yorkshire Cups, and is in the club's Hall of Fame.

== Biography ==
=== Background ===
Douglas Clark was born in Ellenborough, Cumberland, England on 2 May 1891.

=== Playing career ===
==== 1910s ====
During the 1909–10 Northern Rugby Football Union season, Clark's first, he played in Huddersfield's 21–0 victory over Batley in the 1909 Yorkshire Cup Final at Headingley, Leeds on Saturday 27 November 1909. The following year he played in the 2–8 loss against Wakefield Trinity in the 1910 Yorkshire Cup Final at Headingley, Leeds on Saturday 3 December 1910. At the end of the season he played in Huddersfield's 13–5 victory over Wigan in the Championship Final, and also played in the 22–10 victory over Hull Kingston Rovers in the 1911 Yorkshire Cup Final at Belle Vue, Wakefield on Saturday 25 November 1911. During the 1911–12 Kangaroo tour Clark played in the forwards for Great Britain in two Ashes series tests matches.

Clark played in Huddersfield's 9–5 victory over Warrington in the 1913 Challenge Cup Final at Headingley, Leeds in front of a crowd of 22,754. He also scored a hat-trick of tries in his side's victory in the Championship Final of 1913. Clark played in Huddersfield's 19–3 victory over Bradford Northern in the 1913 Yorkshire Cup Final at Thrum Hall, Halifax on Saturday 29 November 1913. Going on the 1914 Great Britain Lions tour of Australia and New Zealand, he played for in the famous "Rorke's Drift Test" in Sydney when his side won with 11 men. Clark was a member of Fartown's "Team of all talents" which won all four cups in 1915. Clark played in the 31–0 victory over Hull F.C. in the 1914 Yorkshire Cup Final at Headingley, Leeds on Saturday 28 November 1914. Clark played in the 37–3 victory over St. Helens in the 1915 Challenge Cup Final at Watersheddings, Oldham on Saturday 1 May 1915 in front of a crowd of 8,000. Clark played in the 35–2 victory over Leeds in the 1914–15 Northern Rugby Football Union season's Championship Final.

Clark served in World War I on the front line in France in 1917, earning the Military Medal for his deeds. Clark played in the 14–8 victory over Dewsbury in the 1918–19 Yorkshire Cup Final at Headingley, Leeds on Saturday 17 May 1919. He played in the 24–5 victory over Leeds in the 1919–20 Yorkshire Cup Final at Thrum Hall, Halifax on Saturday 29 November 1919.

==== 1920s ====
Clark and played in the 21–10 victory over Wigan in the 1920 Challenge Cup Final at Headingley, Leeds in front of a crowd of 14,000. Clark played in the 2–3 defeat by Leeds in the Championship Final. Clark was selected to go on the 1920 Great Britain Lions tour of Australasia. He played in the 5–15 defeat by Hull Kingston Rovers in the Championship Final. Clark played in the 4–10 loss against Hull F.C. in the 1923 Yorkshire Cup Final at Headingley, Leeds on Saturday 24 November 1923, played in the 0–2 defeat by Dewsbury in the 1925 Yorkshire Cup Final at Belle Vue, Wakefield on Saturday 28 November 1925, and played in the 10–3 victory over Wakefield Trinity in the 1926 Yorkshire Cup Final at Headingley, Leeds on Wednesday 1 December 1926, the initial match at Headingley, Leeds on Saturday 27 November 1926 had been postponed due to fog.

Clark also played in Huddersfield's victories in the Yorkshire League during the 1911–12 season, 1912–13 season, 1913–14 season, 1914–15 season, 1919–20 season and 1921–22 season. By the time of his retirement from football in 1927 he had helped his club to three Challenge Cups, and seven Yorkshire Cups.

=== Post-playing ===
After rugby, he continued his wrestling career with great success, becoming All-in wrestling World champion and touring Australia in the 1930s.

Clark died aged 59 in Birkby, Huddersfield, West Riding of Yorkshire, England. In 2005 he was inducted into the British Rugby League Hall of Fame.
