= Fred Longstaff =

GB & England international rugby league footballer

Personal information
- Full name: Frederick Longstaff
- Born: 18 September 1890 Bradford district, England
- Died: 22 July 1916 (aged 25) Somme, France

Playing information
- Position: Forward
Club
| Years | Team | Pld | T | G | FG | P |
|---|---|---|---|---|---|---|
| 1909–11 | Halifax | 57 | 7 | 31 | 0 | 83 |
| 1911–15 | Huddersfield | 135 | 15 | 25 | | 95 |
| | Total | 192 | 22 | 56 | 0 | 178 |
Representative
| Years | Team | Pld | T | G | FG | P |
| | Yorkshire |
| 1914 | England | 1 | 0 | 0 | 0 | 0 |
| 1914 | Great Britain | 2 | 0 | 2 | 0 | 2 |

Fred Longstaff (18 September 1890 – 22 July 1916) was an English professional rugby league footballer who played in the 1900s and 1910s. He played at representative level for Great Britain, England and Yorkshire, and at club level for Victoria Rangers ARLFC (in Eccleshill, Bradford), Halifax and Huddersfield, as a forward. He was a member of Huddersfield's 1914/15 'Team of All Talents' by winning All Four Cups available to them.

== Background ==
Fred Longstaff's birth was registered in Bradford district, West Riding of Yorkshire, England, and he died aged 25 on 22 July 1916, fighting at the Battle of the Somme, France. He served as a Private with the 1st/6th Bn. West Yorkshire Regiment (Prince of Wales's Own). He is buried at Blighty Valley Cemetery, Authuille Wood.

== Playing career ==
=== Championship final appearances ===
Longstaff played as a forward, and scored a goal in Huddersfield's 13-5 victory over Wigan in the Championship Final during the 1911–12 season at Thrum Hall, Halifax on Saturday 4 May 1912, in front of a crowd of 15,000, played as a forward in the 29-2 victory over Wigan in the Championship Final during the 1912–13 season at Belle Vue, Wakefield on Saturday 3 May 1913, in front of a crowd of 17,000, played as a forward in the 3-5 defeat by Salford in the Championship Final during the 1913–14 season at Headingley, Leeds on Saturday 25 April 1914, in front of a crowd of 8,091, and played as a forward, and scored a try in the 35-2 victory over Leeds in the Championship Final during the 1914–15 season at Belle Vue, Wakefield on Saturday 24 April 1915, in front of a crowd of 14,000.

=== Challenge Cup Final appearances ===
Longstaff played as a forward in Huddersfield's 9-5 victory over Warrington in the 1912–13 Challenge Cup Final during the 1912–13 season at Headingley, Leeds on Saturday 26 April 1913, in front of a crowd of 22,754, and played as a forward in the 37-3 victory over St. Helens in the 1914–15 Challenge Cup Final during the 1914–15 season at Watersheddings, Oldham on Saturday 1 May 1915, in front of a crowd of 8,000.

=== County League appearances ===
Longstaff played in Huddersfield's victories in the Yorkshire League during the 1911–12 season, 1912–13 season, 1913–14 season and 1914–15 season.

=== County Cup Final appearances ===
Longstaff played as a forward in Huddersfield's 19-3 victory over Bradford Northern in the 1913–14 Yorkshire Cup Final during the 1913–14 season at Thrum Hall, Halifax on Saturday 29 November 1913, in front of a crowd of 12,000, and played as a forward (the two tries that are occasionally misattributed to Fred Longstaff, were actually scored by Harold Wagstaff) in the 31-0 victory over Hull F.C. in the 1914–15 Yorkshire Cup Final during the 1914–15 season at Headingley, Leeds on Saturday 28 November 1914, in front of a crowd of 12,000.

=== Club career ===
Longstaff transferred from Victoria Rangers ARLFC to Halifax, he transferred from Halifax to Huddersfield, he made his début for Huddersfield in the 24-3 victory over Halifax at Fartown Ground, Huddersfield on Saturday 23 December 1911, and he played his last match in the 37-3 victory over St. Helens in the 1914–15 Challenge Cup Final during the 1914–15 season at Watersheddings, Oldham on Saturday 1 May 1915, in front of a crowd of 8,000.

=== Representative honours ===
Longstaff won a cap for England while at Huddersfield in 1914 against Wales, and won caps for Great Britain while at Huddersfield in 1914 against Australia, and New Zealand.

Longstaff played as a forward, and scored a try in the "Possibles" 28-15 victory over the "Probables" in the Yorkshire County Trial during the 1913–14 season at Mount Pleasant, Batley on Wednesday 1 October 1913, in front of a crowd of 2,000.

Longstaff played as a forward in Yorkshire's 3-8 defeat by Cumberland in the 1913–14 County Championship during the 1913–14 season at Lonsdale Park, Workington on Saturday 11 October 1913, in front of a crowd of 3,000, and played as a forward, and scored 2-goals in the 19-11 victory over Lancashire in the 1913–14 County Championship during the 1913–14 season at Fartown Ground, Huddersfield on Wednesday 10 December 1913, in front of a crowd of 3,500.
