= 1919–20 Lancashire Cup =

- Structure: Regional knockout competition
- Teams: 12
- Winners: Oldham
- Runners-up: Rochdale Hornets

The 1919–20 Lancashire Cup was the twelfth competition for this regional rugby league competition. The final was contested between the same finalists as the Spring tournament, but the result was reversed as Oldham beat Rochdale Hornets at The Willows, Salford by a score of 7–0.

== Background ==
The number of teams entering this competition was again 12 with four byes in the first round

== Competition and results ==
=== Round 1 ===
Involved 4 matches and 8 clubs. Broughton Rangers, Oldham, Wigan and St Helens Recs were awarded a bye.

Game No	Fixture date	Home team	Score	Away team	Venue	Att	Rec	Notes	Ref
1	Sat 18-10-1919	Leigh	0–11	Rochdale Hornets	Mather Lane				
2	Sat 18-10-1919	Salford	0–15	Barrow	The Willows				
3	Sat 18-10-1919	Swinton	5–4	Warrington	Chorley Road ground				
4	Sat 18-10-1919	Widnes	16–8	St. Helens	Lowerhouse Lane				

=== Round 2 – quarterfinals ===
Game No	Fixture date	Home team	Score	Away team	Venue	Att	Rec	Notes	Ref
1	Sat 01-11-1919	Broughton Rangers	3–7	Oldham	The Cliff				
2	Sat 01-11-1919	Rochdale Hornets	8–6	Wigan	Athletic Grounds				
3	Sat 01-11-1919	Swinton	2–0	Barrow	Chorley Road ground				
4	Sat 01-11-1919	Widnes	7–3	St Helens Recs	Lowerhouse Lane				

=== Semi finals ===
Game No	Fixture date	Home team	Score	Away team	Venue	Att	Rec	Notes	Ref
1	Sat 15-11-1919	Rochdale Hornets	8–3	Widnes	Athletic Grounds				
2	Sat 15-11-1919	Swinton	2–2	Oldham	Chorley Road ground				
Replay
3	Mon 17-11-1919	Oldham	26–2	Swinton	Watersheddings				

=== Final ===
The attendance at the final was 19,000 and receipts £1,615.

6 December 1919

Oldham	7 – 0	Rochdale Hornets
Tries: Finnerty; Goals: Ferguson (2)

The Willows, Salford
Attendance: 19,000
Referee: R. H. Jackson (St Helens)

==== Teams and scorers ====
Oldham	№	Rochdale Hornets
	Teams	
James Parkinson	1	A. Blan
Jim Finnerty	2	J. Fairhurst
Billy Hall	3	Jack Corsi
Evan Davies	4	G. Prudence
Thomas Fitton	5	H. Paddon
Danny Thompson	6	J. Heaton
Maurice Tighe	7	Ernest Jones
A. E. Moore	8	Tommy Woods
Joe Ferguson	9	Jack Bennett
Bill Biggs	10	Joe Bowers
Jack Collins	11	V. Slade
Herman Hilton	12	S. Carter
Willie Thomas	13	W. Richardson

Scoring – Try = three (3) points – Goal = two (2) points – Drop goal = two (2) points

=== The road to success ===
First round
Swinton	5
Warrington	4
Salford	0
Barrow	15
Broughton Rangers
bye
Oldham
bye
Leigh	0
Rochdale Hornets	11
Wigan
bye
Widnes	16
St. Helens	8
St Helens Recs
bye

Second round
Swinton	2
Barrow	0
Broughton Rangers	3
Oldham	7
Rochdale Hornets	8
Wigan	6
Widnes	7
St Helens Recs	3

Semifinals
Swinton	2(2)
Oldham	2(26)
Rochdale Hornets	8
Widnes	3

Final
Oldham	7
Rochdale Hornets	0

== See also ==
- 1919–20 Northern Rugby Football Union season
