= Albert Rosenfeld =

Australian rugby league footballer

Personal information
- Full name: Albert Aaron Rosenfeld
- Born: 28 July 1885 Sydney, Australia
- Died: 7 September 1970 (aged 85) Huddersfield, England

Playing information
- Height: 166 cm (5 ft 5 in)
- Weight: 73.5 kg (162 lb; 11 st 8 lb)
- Position: Stand-off/Five-eighth, Wing
Club
Years	Team	Pld	T	G	FG	P
1908	Eastern Suburbs	12	6	1	0	20
1909–21	Huddersfield	287	366	2	0	1102
1921–23	Wakefield Trinity	66	16	1	0	50
1923–24	Bradford Northern	23	1	0	0	3
	Total	388	389	4	0	1175
Representative
Years	Team	Pld	T	G	FG	P
1908–1909	Australia	5	1	0	0	3

Albert Aaron Rosenfeld (28 July 1885 – 7 September 1970) was a pioneer Australian rugby league footballer, a national representative whose club career was played in Sydney and in England. He played for New South Wales in the first rugby league match run by the newly created 'New South Wales Rugby Football League' which had just split away from the established New South Wales Rugby Football Union. During his 16-year English career he set a number of try-scoring records including the standing world first-grade record of 80 tries in a season in 1913–14.

== Australian career ==
Born in Sydney, the son of a Jewish tailor, Rosenfeld was a foundation player for the Eastern Suburbs club in the Australian inaugural season 1908 and in 1909. He played on Easter Monday 1908 in the Easts team that beat Newtown 32–16 on the first day of rugby league premiership football in Australia.

A stand-off, Rosenfeld represented his country in four Test matches. He made his Test début in Australia's first ever international series against New Zealand in 1908 where he appeared in all three matches. Later that season he was selected for Australia's inaugural Kangaroo Tour of 1908–09, making one Test appearance and playing in 13 minor representative matches.

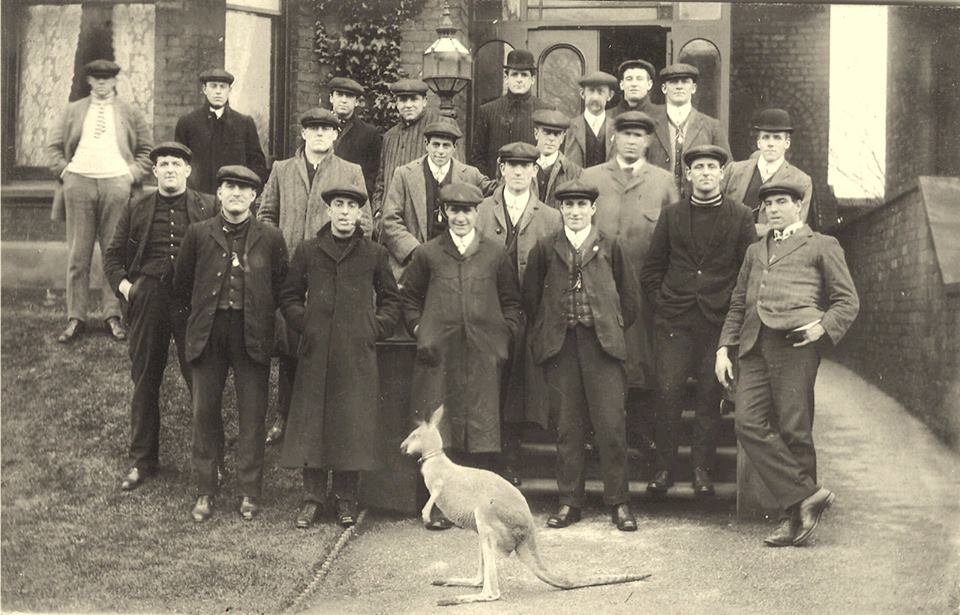
Rosenfeld middle centre (under the lamp) with the 1908 Kangaroos

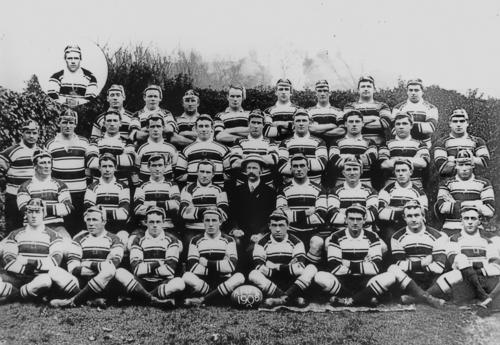
Rosenfeld (back row, far right) with 1908 Kangaroos

== English career ==
Whilst on tour Rosenfeld signed with English club Huddersfield after falling in love with Ethel (née Barrand) a local mill manager's daughter whom he later married. He was moved to the wing position by his new club and became a try scoring sensation. In the English season of 1911–12 he set a new try scoring record for one season with 78 tries only to better it the following but one season by scoring 80. To date neither mark has been beaten in England or Australia. The nearest anyone has come was 72 by, coincidentally another Australian and former Eastern Suburbs player, playing in England Brian Bevan in the 1952–53 season.

In England he played for Huddersfield, Wakefield Trinity and Bradford Northern and made the following Cup Final or international appearances:

- on the wing, and scored a try in Huddersfield's 21–0 victory over Batley in the 1909–10 Yorkshire Cup Final during the 1909–10 season at Headingley, Leeds on 27 November 1909,
- on the wing in the 2–8 defeat by Wakefield Trinity in the 1910–11 Yorkshire Cup Final during the 1910–11 season at Headingley, Leeds on 3 December 1910,
- on the wing, and scored a try in the 22–10 victory over Hull Kingston Rovers in the 1911–12 Yorkshire Cup Final during the 1911–12 season at Belle Vue, Wakefield on 25 November 1911,
- on the wing, and scored a try in the 19–3 victory over Bradford Northern in the 1913–14 Yorkshire Cup Final during the 1913–14 season at Thrum Hall, Halifax on 29 November 1913,
- on the wing, and scored a try in the 31–0 victory over Hull F.C. in the 1914–15 Yorkshire Cup Final during the 1914–15 season at Headingley, Leeds on 28 November 1914
- on the wing, and scored a try in the 24–5 victory over Leeds in the 1919–20 Yorkshire Cup Final during the 1919–20 season at Thrum Hall, Halifax on 29 November 1919.
- on the wing, in Wakefield Trinity's 3–29 defeat by Australia in the 1921–22 Kangaroo tour of Great Britain match at Belle Vue, Wakefield on 22 October 1921.

== War service ==
Rosenfeld's phenomenal try-scoring record is all the more extraordinary considering his career was interrupted by three years of active service. He enlisted in the British Army in 1916 and saw service in the Mesopotamian campaign. He was discharged in 1919.

== Later life ==
Rosenfeld played rugby league until he was thirty-nine and then, still married to Ethel, he lived out his life in Huddersfield, He worked variously as a van driver and in a local dye house. Aged 85 years, Rosenfeld was the last of the inaugural Kangaroo Tourists to die.

His son Albert 'Aussie' Rosenfeld died following a speedway accident. On 6 July, a crowd of 34,000 at Odsal Stadium witnessed Rosenfeld Jr. crash into the fence during the match between Odsal Boomerangs and Belle Vue Aces. He was taken to St Luke's Hospital, Bradford, with a suspected fractured skull but died 10 days later, on 16 July 1946.

== Accolades ==
During his career (1908–24), Rosenfeld scored 391 tries. His try scoring feats earned him in 1988 a place in the British Rugby League Hall of Fame. In 2005, Rosenfeld was accepted into the International Jewish Sports Hall of Fame with his official induction to take place at the 2009 Maccabiah games. He is one of only two rugby league players to be so honoured. Albert Rosenfeld was awarded Life Membership of the New South Wales Rugby League in 1914.

In February 2008, Rosenfeld was named in the list of Australia's 100 Greatest Players (1908–2007) which was commissioned by the NRL and ARL to celebrate the code's centenary year in Australia.

== See also ==
- Huddersfield Giants
- Harold Wagstaff
- Rosenfeld (disambiguation)
- List of select Jewish rugby league players
