= 1914–15 Lancashire Cup =

- Structure: Regional knockout competition
- Teams: 12
- Winners: Rochdale Hornets
- Runners-up: Wigan

The 1914–15 Lancashire Cup was the tenth year of this regional rugby league competition and the last until 1918–19 as the competition was suspended for the duration of the First World War. The cup was won by Rochdale Hornets who beat last year's losing finalists Wigan in the final at The Willows, Salford by a score of 3-2. The attendance at the final was 4,000 and receipts £475.

== Background ==
The First World War had already broken out before the start of the 1914–15 season commenced. Despite the war the decision to play both the regular season and the cup competitions was taken and all were played to a conclusion, although the lack of enthusiasm was evident in the lower attendances at matches and with many teams absent many players who had already enlisted in the Army and the Royal Navy.

The number of teams entering this year's competition was again 12 with four byes in the first round

== Competition and results ==
=== Round 1 ===
Involved 4 matches (with four byes) and 12 clubs

Game No	Fixture date	Home team	Score	Away team	Venue	Att	Rec	Notes	Ref
1	Sat 17 October 1914	Broughton Rangers	5-8	Rochdale Hornets	The Cliff				
2	Sat 17 October 1914	Swinton	13-11	St. Helens	Chorley Road ground				
3	Sat 17 October 1914	Warrington	10-0	Barrow	Wilderspool				
4	Sat 17 October 1914	Wigan	21-5	Oldham	Central Park				
5		Leigh		bye					
6		Widnes		bye					
7		Runcorn		bye					
8		Salford		bye					

=== Round 2 – quarterfinals ===
Game No	Fixture date	Home team	Score	Away team	Venue	Att	Rec	Notes	Ref
1	Sat 31 October 1914	Leigh	0-6	Wigan	Mather Lane				
2	Sat 31 October 1914	Rochdale Hornets	0-0	Widnes	Athletic Grounds				
3	Sat 31 October 1914	Swinton	36-0	Runcorn	Chorley Road ground				
4	Sat 31 October 1914	Warrington	22-10	Salford	Wilderspool				
Replay
1	Wed 4 November 1914	Widnes	0-12	Rochdale Hornets	Lowerhouse Lane				

=== Round 3 – semifinals ===
Game No	Fixture date	Home team	Score	Away team	Venue	Att	Rec	Notes	Ref
1	Sat 14 November 1914	Warrington	5-13	Rochdale Hornets	Wilderspool				

=== Final ===
Game No	Fixture date	Home team	Score	Away team	Venue	Att	Rec	Notes	Ref
	Saturday 5 December 1914	Rochdale Hornets	3-2	Wigan	The Willows	4000	£475	1	

==== Teams and scorers ====
Rochdale Hornets	No.	Wigan
	teams	
Michael English	1	Billy Seddon
Jim Fairhurst	2	Lew Bradley
Jack Corsi	3	Gwyn Thomas
George Prudence	4	Dai Evans
Jack Hopwood	5	Billy Curran
Ernest Jones	6	Frank Walford
Bobbie Schofield	7	Johnny Thomas
Vic Slade	8	Charlie Seeling
Sammy Carter	9	Arthur Francis
Billy Ashworth	10	Percy Coldrick
Joe Bowers	11	George Hayward
George Webb	12	Dick Silcock
Jack Fitzsimmons	13	Dick Ramsdale
3	score	2
0	HT	2
	Scorers	
	Tries	
unknown	T	
	T	
	Goals	
	G	
	Drop Goals	
	DG	
Referee		

Scoring - Try = three (3) points - Goal = two (2) points - Drop goal = two (2) points

=== The road to success ===
First round
Warrington	10
Barrow	0
Salford
bye
Broughton Rangers	5
Rochdale Hornets	8
Widnes
bye
Leigh
bye
Wigan	21
Oldham	5
Swinton	13
St. Helens	11
Runcorn
bye

Second round
Warrington	22
Salford	10
Rochdale Hornets	0 – 13
Widnes	0 – 5
Leigh	0
Wigan	6
Swinton	36
Runcorn	0

Semifinals
Warrington	5
Rochdale Hornets	13
Wigan	33
Swinton	3

Final
Rochdale Hornets	3
Wigan	2

== Notes ==
- 1 The Willows was the home ground of Salford
