= Johnny Rogers (rugby) =

Welsh rugby union and rugby league footballer

- Godfrey Phillips Cigarette card featuring Rogers

Personal information
- Full name: John Henry Rogers
- Born: 1 October 1892 Abergwynfi, Wales
- Died: 26 July 1958 (aged 65) Huddersfield, England

Playing information

Rugby union
- Position: Wing, Scrum-half
Club
Years	Team	Pld	T	G	FG	P
c. 1906–11	Bridgend
1911–13	Cardiff
	Total	0	0	0	0	0

Rugby league
- Position: Wing, Stand-off, Scrum-half
Club
Years	Team	Pld	T	G	FG	P
1913–25	Huddersfield	262	106	42	0	402
1925–26	Wakefield Trinity	57	7	11	0	43
	Total	319	113	53	0	445
Representative
Years	Team	Pld	T	G	FG	P
1921	Other Nationalities	1	0	0	0	0
1914–22	Wales	3	1	0	0	3
1914–22	Great Britain	7	0	6	0	12

John Henry Rogers (1 October 1892 – 26 July 1958) was a Welsh rugby union and professional rugby league footballer who played in the 1900s, 1910s and 1920s. He played club level rugby union (RU) for Bridgend RFC and Cardiff RFC, initially as a wing and later as a scrum-half (alongside Clem Lewis) and representative level rugby league (RL) for Great Britain, Wales and Other Nationalities, and at club level for Huddersfield and Wakefield Trinity, as a wing, stand-off, or scrum-half.

== Background ==
Johnny Rogers was born in Abergwynfi, Wales, he later moved to Tondu, Wales, he was the landlord of the Plumber's Arms public house, Macaulay Street, Huddersfield, and when he retired he continued to live there for three years until his death, he died aged 65 in Huddersfield, West Riding of Yorkshire, England.

== Playing career ==
=== International honours ===
Rogers was selected to go on the 1920 Great Britain Lions tour of Australia and New Zealand, he fractured his left-leg in the 16–24 defeat by Auckland at Domain Cricket Ground on Saturday 24 July 1920, that stopped him from playing in the test matches against New Zealand, he did not return from injury until the match against Keighley at Fartown Ground, Huddersfield on Saturday 15 January 1921. He won a cap for Other Nationalities (RL) while at Huddersfield, won 3 caps for Wales (RL) in 1914–1922 while at Huddersfield, and won caps for Great Britain (RL) while at Huddersfield in 1914 against Australia, in 1920 against Australia (3 matches), in 1921 against Australia (2 matches), and in 1922 against Australia.

=== Championship final appearances ===
Johnny Rogers played in Huddersfield's 3–5 defeat by Salford in the Championship Final during the 1913–14 season, played in Huddersfield's 35–2 victory over Leeds in the Championship Final during the 1914–15 season, and played in Huddersfield's 3–5 defeat by Hull Kingston Rovers in the Championship Final during the 1922–23 season.

=== County League appearances ===
Johnny Rogers played in Huddersfield's victories in the Yorkshire League during the 1913–14 season, 1914–15 season, 1919–20 season and 1921–22 season.

=== Challenge Cup Final appearances ===
Johnny Rogers played in Huddersfield's 37–3 victory over St. Helens in the 1915 Challenge Cup Final during the 1914–15 season at Watersheddings, Oldham on Saturday 1 May 1915 in front of a crowd of 8,000, and played in the 21–10 victory over Wigan in the 1920 Challenge Cup Final during the 1919–20 season at Headingley, Leeds on Saturday 1 May 1915 in front of a crowd of 14,000.

=== County Cup Final appearances ===
Johnny Rogers played in Huddersfield's 19–3 victory over Bradford Northern in the 1913–14 Yorkshire Cup Final during the 1913–14 season at Thrum Hall, Halifax on Saturday 29 November 1913, in font of a crowd of 12,000, played, and scored a try in the 31–0 victory over Hull F.C. in the 1914–15 Yorkshire Cup Final during the 1914–15 season at Headingley, Leeds on Saturday 28 November 1914, in font of a crowd of 12,000, played in the 14–8 victory over Dewsbury in the 1918–19 Yorkshire Cup Final during the 1918–19 season at Headingley, Leeds on Saturday 17 May 1919, played in the 24–5 victory over Leeds in the 1919–20 Yorkshire Cup Final during the 1919–20 season at Thrum Hall, Halifax on Saturday 29 November 1919, and played in the 4–10 defeat by Hull F.C. in the 1923 Yorkshire Cup Final during the 1923–24 season at Headingley, Leeds on Saturday 24 November 1923.

=== All Four Cups, and "Team of All Talents" ===
Johnny Rogers was a member of Huddersfield's 1914–15 All Four Cups winning team, known as the 'Team of All Talents'.

=== Club career ===
Johnny Rogers made his début for Bridgend RFC aged-14 as a late-replacement wing selected by Ben Gronow c. 1906, later playing Scrum-half alongside fly-half Clem Lewis initially at Bridgend RFC, and then at Cardiff RFC, he swapped codes from the amateur rugby union to the professional rugby league, and joined Huddersfield on Saturday 1 March 1913 with a signing-on fee of £100 (based on increases in average earnings, this would be approximately £34,650 in 2014), he made his début and scored three tries, and a goal for Huddersfield in the 73–5 victory over Bramley at Fartown Ground, Huddersfield on Saturday 1 March 1913, he joined Wakefield Trinity on Friday 9 January 1925 with a transfer fee of £300 (based on increases in average earnings, this would be approximately £47,460 in 2014), he made his début for Wakefield Trinity during January 1925.
