= Stan Moorhouse =

GB & England international rugby league footballer

- Godfrey Phillips Cigarette card featuring Stan Moorhouse

Personal information
- Full name: Stanley Moorhouse
- Born: c. 1892 Huddersfield, England
- Died: 23 April 1951 (aged 59) Almondbury, England

Playing information
- Position: Wing
Club
| Years | Team | Pld | T | G | FG | P |
|---|---|---|---|---|---|---|
| 1909–23 | Huddersfield | 255 | 240 | 1 | | 722 |
| 1923–24 | Bradford Northern | 5 | 0 | 0 | | 0 |
| | Total | 260 | 240 | 1 | 0 | 722 |
Representative
| Years | Team | Pld | T | G | FG | P |
| 1912–14 | England | 3 | 7 | 0 | 0 | 21 |
| 1912–20 | Yorkshire | 5 | 8 | 0 | 0 | 24 |
| 1914 | Great Britain | 2 | 4 | 0 | 0 | 12 |

Stanley Moorhouse (c. 1892 – 23 April 1951) was an English professional rugby league footballer who played in the 1900s, 1910s and 1920s. He played at representative level for Great Britain and England, and at club level for Huddersfield and Bradford Northern as a wing.

== Background ==
Stan Moorhouse's birth was registered in Huddersfield, West Riding of Yorkshire, England, and he died aged 59 in Almondbury, Huddersfield, West Riding of Yorkshire, England.

== Playing career ==
=== Club career ===
Moorhouse played on the wing, and scored a try in Huddersfield's 22–10 victory over Hull Kingston Rovers in the 1911 Yorkshire Cup Final during the 1911–12 season at Belle Vue, Wakefield on Saturday 25 November 1911, played on the wing, and scored a try in the 31–0 victory over Hull F.C. in the 1914 Yorkshire Cup Final during the 1914–15 season at Headingley, Leeds on Saturday 28 November 1914, and played on the wing, and scored four tries in the 24–5 victory over Leeds in the 1919–20 Yorkshire Cup Final during the 1919–20 season at Thrum Hall, Halifax on Saturday 29 November 1919. The record for the most tries in a Yorkshire Cup Final is 4-tries, and is jointly held by; Stan Moorhouse, Alan Smith and Stanley Smith.

A joint benefit season/testimonial match at Huddersfield for; Stan Moorhouse and Arthur Swinden took place during the 1921–22 season, including the match against Hull F.C. at Fartown Ground, Huddersfield on Saturday 1 April 1922.

=== International honours ===
Moorhouse won caps for England while at Huddersfield in 1912 against Wales, in 1913 against Wales, in 1914 against Wales. He equalled the record for the most tries scored in an England match, with four against Wales at South Devon Place, Plymouth on Saturday 15 February 1913.

Moorhouse also won caps for Great Britain while at Huddersfield when he was selected to go on the 1914 Great Britain Lions tour of Australia and New Zealand.
