= Major Holland =

Personal information
- Born: 29 October 1887 Halifax, West Riding of Yorkshire, England
- Died: 24 August 1953 (aged 65) Huddersfield, England

Playing information
- Position: Fullback
Club
Years	Team	Pld	T	G	FG	P
1909–21	Huddersfield	218	7	299		619
1921–23	Bramley
	Total	218	7	299	0	619

Major Holland (29 October 1887 – 24 August 1953) was an English rugby league footballer of the early 20th century. Born in Halifax, West Riding of Yorkshire, England, Holland played at fullback for Huddersfield between 1909 and 1921 and, subsequently, for Bramley.

== Career ==
Holland was signed by Huddersfield in 1908 after a trial match and made his debut against Bramley in January 1909.

In the 1913–14 season Holland was the leading points scorer as he scored 268 points. He set a Huddersfield club record of 39 points (18 goals, 1 try) in the Challenge Cup match against amateur side Swinton Park by a then record score of 119–2.

The following season Holland was a member of Huddersfield's Team of all talents that won all four trophies available to them; the Championship, the Yorkshire Cup, the Yorkshire County League and the Challenge Cup. The final of the Challenge Cup being won 37–3 against St. Helens at Watersheddings, Oldham on 1 May 1915.

When the league resumed after the First World War Holland won another Challenge Cup winner's medal as Huddersfield beat Wigan 21–10 at Headingley, Leeds.

In September 1921 Holland left Huddersfield and joined Bramley, however only 18 months later he was placed on the transfer list by Bramley and joined new formed club, Sheffield Hornets, in the Yorkshire Senior League ending a 15-year association with the professional game.

== Personal life ==
Away from rugby Holland was a publican for many years and was the licensee of the Crescent Hotel, Huddersfield at the time of his death in August 1953, having previously run the Calder and Hebble Hotel in Salterhebble.
