= Walter Roman (rugby) =

GB & England international rugby league and union footballer

Personal information
- Full name: Walter James Roman
- Born: 1 July 1880 Bridgwater, England
- Died: 28 July 1916 (aged 36) Cheltenham, England

Playing information

Rugby union
Club
Years	Team	Pld	T	G	FG	P
1895–1910	Bridgwater & Albion
Representative
Years	Team	Pld	T	G	FG	P
≥1897–≤1910	Somerset	19

Rugby league
- Position: Forward
Club
Years	Team	Pld	T	G	FG	P
1910–15	Rochdale Hornets	168	44	15	0	162
Representative
Years	Team	Pld	T	G	FG	P
1910	Lancashire	2	0	0	0	0
1911	Wales & the West of England	1	0	0	0	0
1914	England	1	0	0	0	0

Walter James Roman (1 July 1880 – 28 July 1916) also known by the nickname of "Rattler", was an English rugby union and professional rugby league footballer who played in the 1900s and 1910s. He played representative level rugby union (RU) for Somerset, and at club level for Bridgwater Dreadnaughts and Bridgwater & Albion RFC (captain), alongside Robert Dibble and Tommy Woods, and representative level rugby league (RL) for Great Britain (non-Test matches), England and Wales and the West of England, and at club level for Rochdale Hornets (captain), again alongside Tommy Woods, as a forward.

== Background ==
Walter Roman was born in Bridgwater, Somerset, he served with the Somerset Light Infantry in the Second Boer War and Cawnpore (Kanpur, India), from 1899 to 1907, and later in World War I. On the first day of the Battle of the Somme at Beaumont-Hamel on Saturday 1 July 1916, his 36th birthday, he was admitted to the 12th Field Ambulance with hand, thigh, and leg injuries. He was evacuated from France on Wednesday 5 July 1916, and hospitalised in Cheltenham, his health initially appeared to improve, however he subsequently died of his wounds in Cheltenham.

== Playing career ==
=== International honours ===
Walter Roman won a cap for England (RL) while at Rochdale Hornets in the 16–12 victory over Wales at Knowsley Road, St. Helens on Saturday 14 February 1914.

Roman was selected for Great Britain while at Rochdale Hornets for the 1914 Great Britain Lions tour of Australia and New Zealand, he played in seven non-Test matches, and scored one try.

=== Regional honours ===
Roman represented Wales and the West of England (RL) while at Rochdale Hornets in the 3–23 defeat by Australia on the 1911–12 Kangaroo tour of Great Britain match at Ashton Gate, Bristol in November 1911.

=== County honours ===
Roman represented Somerset (RU) while at Bridgwater & Albion RFC.

=== County Cup Final appearances ===
Walter Roman played as a forward in Rochdale Hornets' 12–5 victory over Oldham in the 1911–12 Lancashire Cup Final during the 1911–12 season at Wheater's Field, Broughton, Salford on Saturday 2 December 1911, in front of a crowd of 20,000.

=== Club career ===
Roman changed rugby football codes from rugby union to rugby league when he transferred from Bridgwater & Albion to Rochdale Hornets in 1910 for a signing-on fee of £200 (based on increases in average earnings, this would be approximately £76,250.00 in 2018).

== Outside of rugby ==
Roman was the Licensed victualler of the Beehive Public house, St. Mary's Gate, Rochdale.

== Genealogical information ==
Walter Roman and his wife, Henrietta (née Washer), are buried together in Wembdon Road Cemetery in Bridgwater, along with Henrietta's brother, Clifford Washer.
