= 1911–12 Lancashire Cup =

1911 Lancashire Cup
- Structure: Regional knockout competition
- Teams: 13
- Winners: Rochdale Hornets
- Runners-up: Oldham

The 1911 Lancashire Cup was the seventh year of this regional rugby league competition. The winners of the trophy, for the first time, were Rochdale Hornets who beat local rivals Oldham in the final at Wheater's Field, Broughton, Salford, by a score of 12–5. The attendance at the final was 20,000 and receipts £630.

== Background ==
The number of teams entering the competition was increased to 13 with the addition of recent newcomers Coventry. Although not a Lancashire club Coventry and were invited to play to increase the number of games played (the previous year they had played in the Yorkshire Cup on the same basis).

With a total of entrants now at 13, there were only three byes in the first round.

== Competition and results ==
=== Round 1 ===
Involved 5 matches (with three byes) and 13 clubs

Game No	Fixture date	Home team	Score	Away team	Venue	Att	Rec	Notes	Ref
1	Sat 21 October 1911	Barrow	2–13	Oldham	Canendish Park				
2	Sat 21 October 1911	Broughton Rangers	24–2	Runcorn	Wheater's Field				
3	Sat 21 October 1911	Rochdale Hornets	13–0	Swinton	Athletic Grounds				
4	Sat 21 October 1911	St. Helens	18–7	Salford	Knowsley Road				
5	Sat 21 October 1911	Widnes	9–5	Warrington	Lowerhouse Lane				
6		Leigh		bye					
7		Coventry		bye					
8		Wigan		bye					

=== Round 2 – quarterfinals ===
Game No	Fixture date	Home team	Score	Away team	Venue	Att	Rec	Notes	Ref
1	Sat 4 November 1911	Broughton Rangers	3–18	Rochdale Hornets	Wheater's Field				
2	Sat 4 November 1911	Oldham	23–0	Leigh	Watersheddings				
3	Sat 4 November 1911	Widnes	22–3	Coventry	Lowerhouse Lane				
4	Sat 4 November 1911	Wigan	22–8	St. Helens	Central Park				

=== Round 3 – semifinals ===
Game No	Fixture date	Home team	Score	Away team	Venue	Att	Rec	Notes	Ref
1	Sat 18 November 1911	Rochdale Hornets	8–8	Widnes	Athletic Grounds				
2	Sat 18 November 1911	Wigan	0–3	Oldham	Central Park				
Replay
3	Wed 22 November 1911	Widnes	0–11	Rochdale Hornets	Lowerhouse Lane				

=== Final ===
Game No	Fixture date	Home team	Score	Away team	Venue	Att	Rec	Notes	Ref
	Saturday 2 December 1911	Rochdale Hornets	12–5	Oldham	Wheater's Field	20000	£630–0–0	1	

==== Teams and scorers ====
Rochdale Hornets	No.	Oldham
	teams	
Johnnie Baxter	1	Alf Wood
Mick English	2	George Smith
Jack Robinson	3	Tom Llewellyn
Tommy West	4	James Lomas
Richard Paddon	5	George Cook
Bobbie Schofield	6	Tommy Brice
Ernest Jones	7	EA Anlezark
Tommy Woods	8	Bill Biggs
Jimmy Dearden	9	Joe Ferguson
Alf Turner	10	Arthur Smith
Walter Roman	11	Tom McCabe
Jack Fitzsimmons	12	Joe Owens
Ernie Jenkins	13	Albert Avery
12	score	5
4	HT	0
	Scorers	
	Tries	
unknown	T	George Smith
	T	
	Goals	
	G	EA Anlezark
	Drop Goals	
	DG	
Referee		

Scoring – Try = three (3) points – Goal = two (2) points – Drop goal = two (2) points

=== The road to success ===
First round
Broughton Rangers	24
Runcorn	2
Rochdale Hornets	13
Swinton	0
Widnes	9
Warrington	5
Coventry
bye
Wigan
bye
St. Helens	18
Salford	7
Barrow	2
Oldham	13
Leigh
bye

Second round
Broughton Rangers	3
Rochdale Hornets	18
Widnes	22
Coventry	3
Wigan	22
St. Helens	8
Oldham	23
Leigh	0

Semifinals
Rochdale Hornets	8 (11)
Widnes	8 (0)
Wigan	0
Oldham	3

Final
Rochdale Hornets	12
Oldham	5

== Notes and comments ==
- 1 Wheater's Field was the home ground of Broughton Rangers with a capacity of 20,000

== See also ==
- 1911–12 Northern Rugby Football Union season
