= Johnnie Baxter =

GB & England international rugby league footballer

John Baxter
Personal information
- Full name: John Baxter
- Born: c. 1881 Dalton-in-Furness, England
- Died: 7 January 1927 (aged 46) Rochdale, England

Playing information
- Position: Fullback, Stand-off, Scrum-half
Club
Years	Team	Pld	T	G	FG	P
1901–14	Rochdale Hornets	318	38	29	0	172
Representative
Years	Team	Pld	T	G	FG	P
1903–08	Lancashire	6	1	0	0	3
1904	England	1	0	0	0	0
1908	Great Britain	1	0	0	0	0

John "Johnnie" Baxter (c. 1881 – 7 January 1927) was an English professional rugby league footballer who played in the 1900s. He played at representative level for Great Britain, England and Lancashire, and at club level for Rochdale Hornets, as a fullback, stand-off, or scrum-half.

== Playing career ==
=== Club career ===
Baxter made his début for Rochdale Hornets against Salford at Athletic Grounds, Rochdale on Saturday 14 December 1901.

Baxter played fullback in Rochdale Hornets' 12–5 victory over Oldham in the 1911–12 Lancashire Cup Final during the 1911–12 season at Wheater's Field, Broughton, Salford on Saturday 2 December 1911, in front of a crowd of 20,000.

=== Representative honours ===
Baxter won a cap for England while at Rochdale Hornets in 1904 against Other Nationalities, and won a cap for Great Britain while at Rochdale Hornets in 1908 against New Zealand.

Baxter represented Lancashire while at Rochdale Hornets.
