= Smales =

Smales is an English surname. Notable people with this surname include:

- Alastair Smales (born 1962), Australian swimmer
- Daniel Smales (born 1990), English actor
- Ian Smales (born 1968), English rugby league football player
- John Smales (1888–1930), English rugby league football player
- Kenneth Smales (1927–2015), English cricket player
- Thomas Smales (1934–2017), English rugby league football player
- Tommy Smales (born 1939), English rugby league football player
