= 1931 Salford City Council election =

Local election in Salford

- 2 November 1931

16 of 64 seats on Salford City Council 33 seats needed for a majority
| | First party | Second party | Third party |
|---|---|---|---|
| Party | Conservative | Labour | Liberal |
| Last election | 9 seats, 33.5% | 1 seats, 40.8% | 3 seats, 10.3% |
| Seats before | 26 | 18 | 11 |
| Seats won | 13 | 1 | 0 |
| Seats after | 33 | 11 | 11 |
| Seat change | ▲7 | ▼7 | Steady |
| Popular vote | 29,542 | 21,605 | 0 |
| Percentage | 55.3% | 40.4% | 0.0% |
| Swing | ▲21.8% | ▼0.4% | ▼10.3% |
| | Fourth party |
| Party | Independent |
| Last election | 3 seats, 15.5% |
| Seats before | 9 |
| Seats won | 2 |
| Seats after | 9 |
| Seat change | Steady |
| Popular vote | 2,208 |
| Percentage | 4.1% |
| Swing | ▼11.4% |
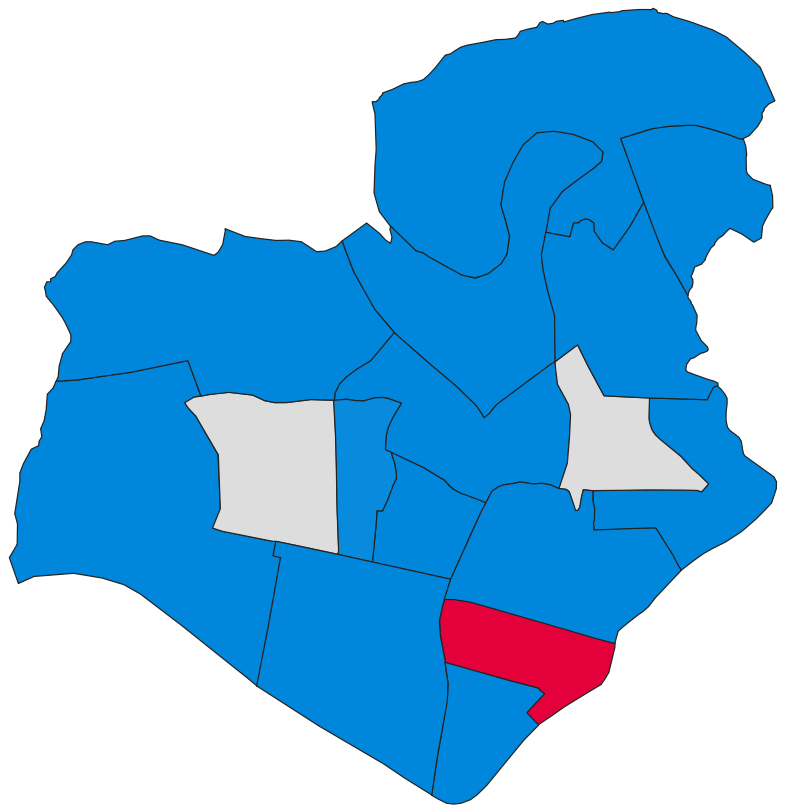
- Map of results of 1931 election
Leader of the Council before election
No overall control
Leader of the Council after election
Conservative

Elections to Salford City Council were held on Monday, 2 November 1931. One-third of the councillors seats were up for election, with each successful candidate to serve a three-year term of office. The Conservative Party gained overall control of the council from no overall control.

== Election result ==
| Party | Votes | | Seats | | | Full Council | |
| Conservative Party | 29,542 (55.3%) | ▲21.8 | 13 (81.3%) | 13 / 16 | ▲7 | 33 (51.6%) | 33 / 64 |
| Labour Party | 21,605 (40.4%) | ▼0.4 | 1 (6.3%) | 1 / 16 | ▼7 | 11 (17.2%) | 11 / 64 |
| Liberal Party | 0 (0.0%) | ▼10.3 | 0 (0.0%) | 0 / 16 | Steady | 11 (17.2%) | 11 / 64 |
| Independent | 2,208 (4.1%) | ▼11.4 | 2 (12.5%) | 2 / 16 | Steady | 9 (14.1%) | 9 / 64 |
| Communist | 105 (0.2%) | N/A | 0 (0.0%) | 0 / 16 | N/A | 0 (0.0%) | 0 / 64 |

=== Full council ===
↓
| 11 | 11 | 9 | 33 |

=== Aldermen ===
↓
| 7 | 1 | 8 |

=== Councillors ===
↓
| 11 | 4 | 8 | 25 |

== Ward results ==
=== Albert Park ===
Albert Park
| Party | Candidate | Votes | % | ±% |
|---|---|---|---|---|
| Conservative | T. O. Smith* | 2,520 | 70.8 | N/A |
| Labour | A. Worthington | 1,041 | 29.2 | −8.0 |
| Majority | | 1,479 | 41.6 | |
| Turnout | | 3,561 | | |
| Conservative hold | | Swing | | |

=== Charlestown ===
Charlestown
| Party | Candidate | Votes | % | ±% |
|---|---|---|---|---|
| Conservative | A. Worsley | 2,912 | 56.3 | N/A |
| Labour | J. F. Crane* | 2,198 | 42.5 | −2.8 |
| Communist | R. France | 58 | 1.2 | N/A |
| Majority | | 714 | 13.8 | |
| Turnout | | 5,168 | | |
| Conservative gain from Labour | | Swing | | |

=== Claremont ===
Claremont
| Party | Candidate | Votes | % | ±% |
|---|---|---|---|---|
| Conservative | A. H. Lyons* | 2,232 | 80.1 | N/A |
| Labour | J. Openshaw | 554 | 19.9 | −1.0 |
| Majority | | 1,678 | 60.2 | |
| Turnout | | 2,786 | | |
| Conservative hold | | Swing | | |

=== Crescent ===
Crescent
| Party | Candidate | Votes | % | ±% |
|---|---|---|---|---|
| Conservative | J. W. Fieldsend | 2,354 | 58.4 | +2.0 |
| Labour | A. Millwood* | 1,680 | 41.6 | −2.0 |
| Majority | | 674 | 16.8 | +4.0 |
| Turnout | | 4,034 | | |
| Conservative gain from Labour | | Swing | | |

=== Docks ===
Docks
| Party | Candidate | Votes | % | ±% |
|---|---|---|---|---|
| Conservative | J. L. Clampitt* | 1,980 | 60.2 | +0.1 |
| Labour | J. H. R. Caldwell | 1,310 | 39.8 | −0.1 |
| Majority | | 670 | 20.4 | +0.2 |
| Turnout | | 3,290 | | |
| Conservative hold | | Swing | | |

=== Kersal ===
Kersal
| Party | Candidate | Votes | % | ±% |
|---|---|---|---|---|
| Conservative | J. W. Weir* | uncontested | | |
| Conservative hold | | Swing | | |

=== Langworthy ===
Langworthy
| Party | Candidate | Votes | % | ±% |
|---|---|---|---|---|
| Conservative | C. R. V. Haynes* | 2,381 | 66.9 | +8.7 |
| Labour | P. Moulson | 1,177 | 33.1 | −8.7 |
| Majority | | 1,204 | 33.8 | +17.4 |
| Turnout | | 3,558 | | |
| Conservative hold | | Swing | | |

=== Mandley Park ===
Mandley Park
| Party | Candidate | Votes | % | ±% |
|---|---|---|---|---|
| Conservative | H. Kitchen | 2,279 | 59.7 | +1.0 |
| Labour | J. Brentnall* | 1,537 | 40.3 | −1.0 |
| Majority | | 742 | 19.4 | +2.0 |
| Turnout | | 3,816 | | |
| Conservative gain from Labour | | Swing | | |

=== Ordsall Park ===
Ordsall Park
| Party | Candidate | Votes | % | ±% |
|---|---|---|---|---|
| Conservative | J. Gregory | 2,378 | 50.9 | +0.8 |
| Labour | J. Lemmon* | 2,245 | 48.1 | −1.8 |
| Communist | G. Watson | 47 | 1.0 | N/A |
| Majority | | 133 | 2.8 | +2.6 |
| Turnout | | 4,670 | | |
| Conservative gain from Labour | | Swing | | |

=== Regent ===
Regent
| Party | Candidate | Votes | % | ±% |
|---|---|---|---|---|
| Labour | J. Howard | 2,444 | 50.8 | +0.3 |
| Conservative | R. Heywood | 2,218 | 46.1 | N/A |
| Independent | G. R. Greatorex | 152 | 3.1 | −46.4 |
| Majority | | 226 | 4.7 | +3.7 |
| Turnout | | 4,814 | | |
| Labour hold | | Swing | | |

=== St. Matthias' ===
St. Matthias'
| Party | Candidate | Votes | % | ±% |
|---|---|---|---|---|
| Independent | A. C. Dixon | 2,056 | 50.8 | −4.6 |
| Labour | F. Cowin | 1,994 | 49.2 | +4.6 |
| Majority | | 62 | 1.6 | −9.2 |
| Turnout | | 4,050 | | |
| Independent hold | | Swing | | |

=== St. Paul's ===
St. Paul's
| Party | Candidate | Votes | % | ±% |
|---|---|---|---|---|
| Conservative | C. P. Hampson | 2,097 | 61.0 | N/A |
| Labour | W. Neil* | 1,343 | 39.0 | −9.4 |
| Majority | | 754 | 22.0 | |
| Turnout | | 3,440 | | |
| Conservative gain from Labour | | Swing | | |

=== St. Thomas' ===
St. Thomas'
| Party | Candidate | Votes | % | ±% |
|---|---|---|---|---|
| Conservative | A. F. Carroll | 2,121 | 58.6 | +2.9 |
| Labour | J. H. Kearns* | 1,498 | 41.4 | −2.9 |
| Majority | | 623 | 17.2 | +5.8 |
| Turnout | | 3,619 | | |
| Conservative gain from Labour | | Swing | | |

=== Seedley ===
Seedley
| Party | Candidate | Votes | % | ±% |
|---|---|---|---|---|
| Independent | P. Ashcroft* | uncontested | | |
| Independent hold | | Swing | | |

=== Trinity ===
Trinity
| Party | Candidate | Votes | % | ±% |
|---|---|---|---|---|
| Conservative | T. Pawsey | 1,929 | 50.8 | −5.3 |
| Labour | E. A. Hardy* | 1,866 | 49.2 | +5.3 |
| Majority | | 63 | 1.6 | −10.6 |
| Turnout | | 3,795 | | |
| Conservative gain from Labour | | Swing | | |

=== Weaste ===
Weaste
| Party | Candidate | Votes | % | ±% |
|---|---|---|---|---|
| Conservative | J. Binns* | 2,141 | 74.9 | +2.4 |
| Labour | I. Copson | 718 | 25.1 | −2.4 |
| Majority | | 1,423 | 49.8 | +4.8 |
| Turnout | | 2,859 | | |
| Conservative hold | | Swing | | |

== Aldermanic elections ==
=== Aldermanic election, 6 January 1932 ===
Caused by the death on 1 December 1931 of Alderman A. H. Collins (Liberal, elected as an alderman by the council on 12 August 1931).

In his place, Councillor James Higginbottom (Independent, Crescent, elected 1 November 1920) was elected as an alderman by the council on 6 January 1932.

| Party | Alderman | Ward | Term expires |
|---|---|---|---|
| Independent | James Higginbottom | | 1935 |

=== Aldermanic election, 6 April 1932 ===
Caused by the death on 26 February 1932 of Alderman Samuel Delves (Independent, elected as an alderman by the council on 7 October 1925).

In his place, the Mayor Councillor Joseph Jackson (Liberal, Kersal, elected 17 October 1921) was elected as an alderman by the council on 6 April 1932.

| Party | Alderman | Ward | Term expires |
|---|---|---|---|
| Liberal | Joseph Jackson | | 1935 |

== By-elections between 1931 and 1932 ==
=== St. Thomas', 16 December 1931 ===
Caused by the death of Councillor J. W. Bloom (Labour, St. Thomas', elected 1 November 1920) on 12 November 1931.

St. Thomas'
| Party | Candidate | Votes | % | ±% |
|---|---|---|---|---|
| Conservative | W. Coop | 1,432 | 56.5 | −2.1 |
| Labour | J. H. Kearns | 1,051 | 41.5 | +0.1 |
| National Unemployed Workers' Movement | W. L. McGinley | 51 | 2.0 | N/A |
| Majority | | 381 | 15.0 | −2.2 |
| Turnout | | 2,534 | | |
| Conservative gain from Labour | | Swing | | |

=== Crescent, 21 January 1932 ===
Caused by the election as an alderman of Councillor James Higginbottom (Independent, Crescent, elected 1 November 1920) on 6 January 1932, following the death on 1 December 1931 of Alderman A. H. Collins (Liberal, elected as an alderman by the council on 12 August 1931).

Crescent
| Party | Candidate | Votes | % | ±% |
|---|---|---|---|---|
| Labour | A. Millwood | 1,517 | 51.0 | +9.4 |
| Conservative | A. H. Handslip | 1,460 | 49.0 | −9.4 |
| Majority | | 57 | 2.0 | |
| Turnout | | 2,977 | | |
| Labour gain from Independent | | Swing | | |

=== Kersal, 19 April 1932 ===
Caused by the election as an alderman of the Mayor Councillor Joseph Jackson (Liberal, Kersal, elected 17 October 1921) on 6 April 1932, following the death on 26 February 1932 of Alderman Samuel Delves (Independent, elected as an alderman by the council on 7 October 1925).

Kersal
| Party | Candidate | Votes | % | ±% |
|---|---|---|---|---|
| Conservative | G. W. F. Hampshire | 1,107 | 43.8 | N/A |
| Liberal | D. G. Rothwell | 874 | 34.6 | N/A |
| Labour | W. McLaughlin | 546 | 21.6 | N/A |
| Majority | | 233 | 9.2 | N/A |
| Turnout | | 2,527 | | |
| Conservative gain from Liberal | | Swing | | |

=== Kersal, 15 June 1932 ===
Caused by the death of Councillor John W. Weir (Conservative, Kersal, elected 25 August 1926) on 30 May 1931.

Kersal
| Party | Candidate | Votes | % | ±% |
|---|---|---|---|---|
| Conservative | A. Hodgson | uncontested | | |
| Conservative hold | | Swing | | |
