= Rugby hall of fame =

The Rugby Hall of Fame can refer to the Halls of Fame of the following sports:

== Rugby league ==
- Rugby League Hall of Fame
- Australian Rugby League Hall of Fame
- British Rugby League Hall of Fame

== Rugby union ==
- International Rugby Hall of Fame
- IRB Hall of Fame
- US Rugby Hall of Fame
