= 1914–15 Yorkshire Cup =

- Structure: Regional knockout championship
- Teams: 13
- Winners: Huddersfield
- Runners-up: Hull

The 1914–15 Yorkshire Cup was the tenth occasion on which the Yorkshire Cup competition, a Rugby league competition, was held.

This year's competition was again the turn of the previous cup holder, Huddersfield, winning the trophy by beating Hull F.C. by the score of 31–0

The match was played at Headingley, Leeds, now in West Yorkshire. The attendance was 12,000 and receipts were £422

This was Huddersfield's fifth appearance of what would be seven appearances in eight consecutive finals between 1909 and 1919 (which included four successive victories and six in total.) It was also the second of the four consecutive wins.

== Background ==
Britain had declared war on Germany on 4 August 1914 after they had attacked Luxemburg, Belgium and France. A month later the season proper started against this backdrop. The Yorkshire Cup competition started in October and it was to be the last until the end of the war. Tensions had been building across Britain and the rest of Europe for some time, but, despite this, the 1914–1915 season was played to its conclusion, albeit in some cases a little half-heartedly as evidenced in the lower attendances at matches and with several teams absent and many players already enlisted in the Armed Forces. In the middle of 1915 competitive sporting competition was finally suspended. This season there were no junior/amateur clubs taking part, no new entrants and no "leavers" and so the total of entries remained the same at thirteen. This in turn resulted in three byes in the first round.

== Competition and results ==
=== Round 1 ===
Involved 5 matches (with three byes) and 13 clubs

Game No	Fixture date	Home team	Score	Away team	Venue	Ref
1	Sat 17 Oct 1914	Batley	5–0	Dewsbury	Mount Pleasant	
2	Sat 17 Oct 1914	Bramley	0–25	Halifax	Barley Mow	
3	Sat 17 Oct 1914	Hull Kingston Rovers	10–5	Wakefield Trinity	Craven Street (off Holderness Road)	
4	Sat 17 Oct 1914	Leeds	11–13	Hunslet	Headingley	
5	Sat 17 Oct 1914	York	13–24	Huddersfield	Clarence Street	
6		Bradford Northern		bye		
7		Hull		bye		
8		Keighley		bye		

=== Round 2 – quarterfinals ===
Involved 4 matches and 8 clubs

Game No	Fixture date	Home team	Score	Away team	Venue	Ref
1	Sat 31 Oct 1914	Batley	2–0	Bradford Northern	Mount Pleasant	
2	Sat 31 Oct 1914	Halifax	8A8 (Note: Match abandoned after 50 minutes due to fog)	Huddersfield	Thrum Hall	
3	Sat 31 Oct 1914	Hull	11–5	Hull Kingston Rovers	Boulevard	
4	Sat 31 Oct 1914	Hunslet	12–7	Keighley	Parkside	

=== Round 2 – Replays ===
Involved 1 match and 2 clubs

Game No	Fixture date	Home team	Score	Away team	Venue	Ref
R	Thu 05 Nov 1914	Halifax	2–10	Huddersfield	Thrum Hall	

=== Round 3 – semifinals ===
Involved 2 matches and 4 clubs

Game No	Fixture date	Home team	Score	Away team	Venue	Ref
1	Sat 14 Nov 1914	Huddersfield	64–3	Hunslet	Fartown	
2	Sat 14 Nov 1914	Hull	7–0	Batley	Boulevard	

=== Final ===
Game No	Fixture date	Home team	Score	Away team	Venue	Att	Rec	Ref
	Saturday 28 November 1914	Huddersfield	31–0 (Note: The never to be beaten record widest margin victory in a final)	Hull	Headingley (Note: Headingley is the home ground of Leeds RLFC with a capacity of 21,000. The record attendance was 40,175 for a league match between Leeds and Bradford Northern on 21 May 1947)	12000	422	

==== Teams and scorers ====
Huddersfield	№	Hull
	teams	
Major Holland	1	Ned Rogers
George Todd	2	Alfred Francis
Albert "Rozzi" Rosenfeld	3	Billy Batten
Harold Wagstaff (c)	4	Jack Harrison (VC)
Stan Moorhouse	5	Jim Devereux
Johnny Rogers	6	Sid Deane
Robert Habron	7	Tom Milner
John Higson	8	Tom Herridge
Douglas Clark	9	William Holder
Ben Gronow	10	Joe Hammill
Fred Longstaff	11	Steve Darmody
Arthur Swinden	12	Percy Oldham
H. Banks	13	Dick Taylor
Arthur Bennett (trainer)	Coach	Sid Melville (trainer)
31	score	0
15	HT	0
	Scorers	
	Tries	
Harold Wagstaff (2)	T	
Stan Moorhouse (1)	T	
Billy Banks (1)	T	
George Todd (1)	T	
Albert "Rozzi" Rosenfeld (1)	T	
Johnny Rogers (1)	T	
	T	
	Goals	
Major Holland (5)	G	
Referee		Jimmy May (St. Helens)

Scoring – Try = three (3) points – Goal = two (2) points – Drop goal = two (2) points

=== The road to success ===
First round
Bramley	0
Halifax	25
York	13
Huddersfield	24
Leeds	11
Hunslet	13
Keighley
bye
Hull
bye
Hull Kingston Rovers	10
Wakefield Trinity	5
Batley	5
Dewsbury	0
Bradford Northern
bye

Second round
Halifax	2
Huddersfield	10
Hunslet	12
Keighley	7
Hull	11
Hull Kingston Rovers	5
Batley	2
Bradford Northern	0

Semifinals
Huddersfield	64
Hunslet	3
Hull	7
Batley	0

Final
Huddersfield	31
Hull	0

== See also ==
- 1914–15 Northern Rugby Football Union season
- Rugby league county cups
