= Jack O'Garra =

English rugby league footballer

Personal information
- Full name: Dominic John O'Garra
- Born: 22 February 1891
- Died: 15 January 1960 (aged 68)

Playing information
- Position: Halfback
Club
Years	Team	Pld	T	G	FG	P
1908–22	Widnes	287	51	8		169
Representative
Years	Team	Pld	T	G	FG	P
1913–20	Lancashire	3	1	0		3

Dominic John O'Garra (22 February 1891 – 15 January 1960) was an English rugby league footballer who played as a halfback. He played at club level for Widnes between 1908 and 1922, and at representative level for Lancashire. After retiring from rugby, he was elected onto the town council and became mayor of Widnes in 1945.

== Playing career ==
=== Club career ===
O'Garra made his debut for Widnes in 1908. In March 1921, O'Garra and teammate Arthur Johnson were granted a benefit match in recognition of their service at Widnes.

=== Representative career ===
O'Garra made two appearances for Lancashire in the 1913–14 County Championship, scoring one try in a 24–3 win against Cumberland.

O'Garra was also selected for the 1914 Great Britain Lions tour of Australia and New Zealand. He scored five tries in eight appearances, but did not appear in any Test matches.

== Outside of rugby league ==
In July 1922, O'Garra married Janet Barker at St Marie's Church, Widnes.

After ending his rugby career, O'Garra became the licensee of the Grosvenor Hotel in Widnes. He was elected onto the Widnes town council in 1931, and became mayor of the town in 1945.
