= Jack Chilcott =

GB & Wales international rugby league & union footballer

John Chilcott
Personal information
- Full name: John Chilcott
- Born: 19 August 1885; Nant-y-moel, Glamorgan, Wales
- Died: 1 July 1973 (aged 87); Black Diamond, Washington, United States

Playing information

Rugby union
Club
Years	Team	Pld	T	G	FG	P
	Ogmore Vale RFC
	Cross Keys RFC
	Total	0	0	0	0	0

Rugby league
- Position: Forward
Club
Years	Team	Pld	T	G	FG	P
	Huddersfield
Representative
Years	Team	Pld	T	G	FG	P
1913–14	Wales	2
1914	Great Britain	3	0	0	0	0

John Chilcott (19 August 1885 – 1 July 1973) was a Welsh rugby union and professional rugby league footballer who played in the 1910s. As a Northern Union international he played in the sensational Test Match against Australia on 2 July 1914. This historic match has attained legendary status in the sport. In many ways, the 14-6 victory of the Northern Union over Australia has come to be a metaphor for the values of courage, solidarity and the ability to face adversity that characterise the game.

The name for the game was coined as a tribute to the courage of the Northern Union players, with it being compared to the battle fought at Rorke’s Drift in the Zulu War in 1879, when British troops held a post in the face of overwhelming odds. In the game the Northern Union, led by Harold Wagstaff, ended the match with only 10 players and produced an outstanding defensive display to win by 14 points to 6. Jack played club level rugby union (RU) for Ogmore Vale RFC and Cross Keys RFC, and representative level rugby league (RL) for Great Britain and Wales, and at club level for Huddersfield, as a forward.

== Playing career ==
=== International honours ===
Jack Chilcott won caps for Wales (RL) while at Huddersfield 1913…1914 2-caps, and won caps for Great Britain (RL) while at Huddersfield in 1914 against Australia (3 matches).

=== Challenge Cup Final appearances ===
Jack Chilcott played as a forward in Huddersfield's 9-5 victory over Warrington in the 1912–13 Challenge Cup Final during the 1912–13 season at Headingley, Leeds on Saturday 26 April 1913, in front of a crowd of 22,754.

== Genealogical information ==
Jack Chilcott married Eva Taylor on Thursday 16 April 1914, the marriage was registered during second ¼ 1914 in Huddersfield district.
