= Stuart Prosser =

Welsh former GB international rugby league footballer

Personal information
- Full name: William Stuart Prosser
- Born: 1887; Abertillery, Monmouthshire, Wales
- Died: 12 March 1939 (aged 51); Halifax, Yorkshire, England

Playing information

Rugby union
Club
Years	Team	Pld	T	G	FG	P
	Pontypool RFC

Rugby league
- Position: Stand-off
Club
Years	Team	Pld	T	G	FG	P
1912–25	Halifax	189	6	3	1	26
Representative
Years	Team	Pld	T	G	FG	P
1914	Great Britain	1	0	0	0	0

William Stuart Prosser (1887 – 12 March 1939) was a Welsh rugby union and professional rugby league footballer who played in the 1910s. He played club level rugby union (RU) for Pontypool RFC, and representative level rugby league (RL) for Great Britain, and at club level for Halifax, as a stand-off.

== Biography ==
Prosser was born in Abertillery, Monmouthshire, Wales, in 1887, the son of a coal hewer. He also worked in the mines.

At a young age, he made a name for himself playing in the fly-half position for Pontypool RFC. He played for Monmouth County on 15 occasions. He was spotted by Halifax officials and recruited to come to England in 1912. He took part in the 1914 Great Britain Lions tour of Australia and New Zealand under the captaincy of Harold Wagstaff. He played in the memorable "Rorke's Drift" Test match against Australia in which England had only 10 players for the last half-hour but won the Ashes, 14–6.

After serving during the First World War, Prosser continued to play for Halifax until a shoulder injury ended his career after the conclusion of the 1923–24 season.

The Halifax Courier wrote of Prosser: "He was a popular player, decisive, brainy and quick in action. He frequently stated that scoring tries was not his forte, but he made many openings for others to bring points. He had a wonderful pair of hands and an instinctive sense of position."

Prosser later resided in Sowerby Bridge for many years. He died at age 47 1939 after an illness of two years. Prosser, who began his professional career for Halifax against Wakefield Trinity at Thrum Hall, was buried on the same day of similar match—up in 1939.

== International honours ==
Stuart Prosser won a cap for Great Britain (RL) while at Halifax in 1914 against Australia.

== Challenge Cup Final appearances ==
Stuart Prosser played scrum-half in Halifax's 0–13 defeat by Leigh in the 1920–21 Challenge Cup Final during the 1920–21 season at The Cliff, Broughton on Saturday 30 April 1921, in front of a crowd of 25,000.
