= Arthur Johnson (rugby league) =

GB & England international rugby league footballer

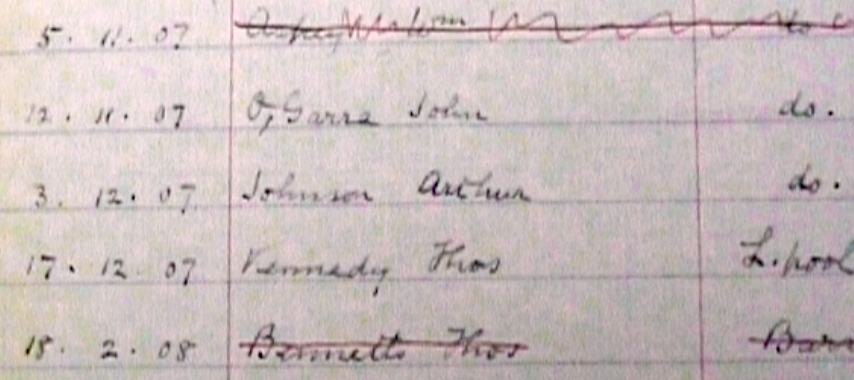
- Extract from Widnes Playing Register for the 1907–08 season showing Arthur Johnson's entry along with his fellow future Great Britain tourist John "Jack" O'Garra

Personal information
- Full name: Arthur Johnson (Note: Johnson's forename is sometimes given incorrectly as Albert in some sources. This error dates to at least as far back as Keith Macklin's 1962 book History of Rugby League Football, it probably arises from confusion with Albert Johnson, a Great Britain player of the 1940s. However contemporary press reports, RFL playing registers and census records all confirm that he was named Arthur, not Albert.)
- Born: 28 October 1890; Widnes, England
- Died: 10 June 1946; Warrington, England

Playing information
- Position: Wing, Prop, Hooker, Second-row, Loose forward
Club
Years	Team	Pld	T	G	FG	P
1909–23	Widnes	258	43	6	0	141
1923–24	Warrington	58	10	0	0	30
	Total	316	53	6	0	171
Representative
Years	Team	Pld	T	G	FG	P
1912–13	Lancashire	3	1	0	0	3
1914	England	1	0	0	0	0
1914–20	Great Britain	4	3	0	0	9

Arthur "Chick" Johnson (28 October 1890 – 10 June 1946) was an English rugby league footballer who played in the 1900s, 1910s and 1920s. He played at representative level for Great Britain and England, and at club level for Widnes and Warrington, as a wing, prop, hooker, second-row, or loose forward. Arthur Johnson inherited his nickname of 'Chick' from his father, the rugby league footballer who played in the 1890s for Lancashire, and Widnes; Old 'Chick' (James "Jim") Johnson.

== Playing career ==
=== Club career ===
Johnson is a Widnes Hall Of Fame Inductee. Johnson made his début for Warrington on 3 February 1923, and made his final appearance for Warrington on 15 November 1924, making 40-appearances for Warrington in 1923–24 season.

=== International honours ===
On the 1914 Great Britain Lions tour of Australia and New Zealand, Widnes provided Jack O'Garra, from a well-known footballing family, and Arthur "Chick" Johnson a renowned as an exponent of the long-dead art of dribbling a rugby ball. He was a forward playing out of position on the wing. With 20 minutes left in the game he dribbled the ball from inside his own half, beating Australia's fullback, Howard Hallett, to score a try, in what became known as the Rorke's Drift Test.

Johnson, gained a cap for England at Widnes in 1914 against Wales, and four caps for Great Britain while at Widnes in 1914 against Australia, and New Zealand, and He was selected to go on the 1920 Great Britain Lions tour of Australasia and played against Australia (two matches).
