= Dick Ramsdale =

Great Britain and England international rugby league footballer

Personal information
- Full name: Richard Ramsdale
- Born: 11 May 1885 Wigan, England
- Died: 8 June 1933 (aged 48) Wigan, England

Playing information
- Height: 6 ft 1 in (1.85 m)
- Weight: 14 st 0 lb (89 kg)
- Position: Forward
Club
Years	Team	Pld	T	G	FG	P
1905–21	Wigan	313	34	0	0	102
Representative
Years	Team	Pld	T	G	FG	P
≥1905–≤21	Lancashire
1910–14	England	5	0	0	0	0
1910–14	Great Britain	8	0	0	0	0

Richard Ramsdale (11 May 1885 – 8 June 1933) was an English professional rugby league footballer who played in the 1900s, 1910s and 1920s. He played at representative level for Great Britain, England and Lancashire, and at club level for Platt Bridge ARLFC (in Platt Bridge, Wigan), and Wigan, as a forward.

== Background ==
Ramsdale's birth was registered in Wigan, Lancashire, England, and he died aged 48 in Wigan, Lancashire, England.

== Playing career ==
Ramsdale played as a forward in Wigan's 10–9 victory over Oldham in the 1908 Lancashire Cup Final during the 1908–09 season at Wheater's Field, Broughton, on Saturday 19 December 1908.

Ramsdale played as a forward, and scored his side's only try in Wigan's 7–3 victory over Oldham in the Championship Final during the 1908–09 season at The Willows, Salford on Saturday 1 May 1909.

He played as a forward in the 22–5 victory over Leigh in the 1909 Lancashire Cup Final during the 1909–10 Northern Rugby Football Union season at Wheater's Field, Broughton, on Saturday 27 November 1909.

Ramsdale won caps for England while at Wigan in 1910 against Wales, in 1911 against Australia (2 matches), in 1913 against Wales, in 1914 against Wales, and won caps for Great Britain while at Wigan on the 1910 Great Britain Lions tour of Australia and New Zealand against Australia and Australasia, in 1911–12 against Australia (2 matches), and in 1914 against Australia (3 matches), and New Zealand.

Ramsdale played as a forward in the 21–5 victory over Rochdale Hornets in the 1912 Lancashire Cup Final during the 1912–13 season at Weaste, Salford, on Wednesday 11 December 1912.

Ramsdale played in Wigan's victories in the Lancashire League during the 1908–09 season, 1910–11 season, 1911–12 season, 1912–13 season, 1913–14 season, 1914–15 season and 1920–21 season.

A Testimonial match at Wigan was shared by; Bert Jenkins, Dick Ramsdale, and Johnny Thomas.
