= Jack Robinson (rugby) =

GB & England international rugby league footballer

- Full name: John Edwin Robinson
- Born: 4 December 1885 Gloucester, England
- Died: August 1951 (aged 65) Gloucester, England

Rugby union career
Senior career
Years	Team	Apps	(Points)
- Gloucester
1907–08	Bath		
- Somerset
- Rugby league career

Playing information
- Position: Wing
Club
Years	Team	Pld	T	G	FG	P
1908–19	Rochdale Hornets	231	96	25	0	338
Representative
Years	Team	Pld	T	G	FG	P
1914	Great Britain	2	1	2	0	0

John Edwin Robinson (1885 – 1951) was a rugby union and professional rugby league footballer who played in the 1900s and 1910s. He played at representative level for Great Britain, and at club level for Rochdale Hornets, as a wing. After touring Australasia with Great Britain, Robinson joined the Great War, and was badly wounded at the Battle of Neuve Chapelle in March 1915.

== Playing career ==
=== Rugby union ===
Prior to playing rugby league, Robinson played rugby union for Gloucester and Bath.

=== Rugby league ===
Robinson played right-centre in Rochdale Hornets' 12–5 victory over Oldham in the 1911–12 Lancashire Cup Final during the 1911–12 season at Wheater's Field, Broughton, Salford on Saturday 2 December 1911, in front of a crowd of 20,000.

Robinson won caps for Great Britain while at Rochdale Hornets in 1914 against Australia (2 matches).
