= Frank Williams (rugby, born 1890) =

GB & Wales international rugby league & union footballer

Personal information
- Born: 20 December 1890 Birmingham, England
- Died: Unknown

Playing information

Rugby union
Club
| Years | Team | Pld | T | G | FG | P |
|---|---|---|---|---|---|---|
| ≤1913–≤13 | Swansea RFC |

Rugby league
- Position: Wing
Club
| Years | Team | Pld | T | G | FG | P |
|---|---|---|---|---|---|---|
| 1913–20 | Halifax | 70 | 32 | 0 | 0 | 96 |
Representative
| Years | Team | Pld | T | G | FG | P |
| 1914 | Wales | 1 | 0 | 0 | 0 | 0 |
| 1914 | Great Britain | 2 | 0 | 0 | 0 | 0 |

Frank Williams (20 December 1890 – death unknown) was a Welsh rugby union and professional rugby league footballer and journalist. He played club level rugby union (RU) for Swansea RFC, and representative level rugby league (RL) for Great Britain and Wales, and at club level for Halifax as a wing. After retiring from rugby, he became a journalist, and worked as the sports editor for the Halifax Courier & Guardian for over 20 years.

== Rugby career ==
Born in Birmingham, Williams moved to Swansea at a young age. He began playing rugby union at school, and represented Wales against England schoolboys.

He began playing for Swansea RFC as a centre at the age of 17, and played for the club until 1913, when he was persuaded to turn professional and join rugby league club Halifax.

Williams won a cap for Wales while at Halifax in 1914, and was also included in the squad for the 1914 Great Britain Lions tour of Australia and New Zealand. He won two caps against Australia on the tour, including in the famous "Rorke's Drift" Test.

His playing career ended in 1919–20, when he was forced to retire for medical reasons.

== News career ==
After ending his playing career, Williams became a journalist for the Halifax Guardian until the paper merged with the Halifax Courier in 1921. After briefly returning to rugby in a coaching role, he joined the newly merged newspaper (now known as the Halifax Courier & Guardian). In 1938, he became sports editor for the newspaper, and remained in the role until his retirement in 1960.
