= William Davies (rugby) =

GB & Wales dual-code rugby international footballer

- Born: William Davies; 27 December 1890 Aberavon, Wales
- Died: 18 September 1967 (aged 76) Exeter, England
- School: Aberavon Council School; Port Talbot County School
- University: Exeter University
- Occupation: Schoolteacher

Rugby union career
- Position: Centre
Senior career
Years	Team	Apps	(Points)
- Aberavon RFC
1912-13	Swansea RFC		
- Plymouth Albion
- Devon
1912	Glamorgan County RFC		
International career
Years	Team	Apps	(Points)
1912	Wales	2	(3)
- Rugby league career

Playing information
- Position: Wing
Club
Years	Team	Pld	T	G	FG	P
1913–21	Leeds R.L.
Representative
Years	Team	Pld	T	G	FG	P
1914–21	Wales	2				0
1914	Great Britain	2				6
1921	Other Nationalities	1				0

William Davies (27 December 1890 – 18 September 1967), also known by the nickname of "Avon", was a Welsh dual-code international rugby union, and professional rugby league footballer who played in the 1910s and 1920s. He played representative level rugby union (RU) for Wales, and at club level for Aberavon and Swansea as a centre, and representative level rugby league (RL) for Great Britain and Wales, and at club level for Leeds, as a wing.

== Playing career ==
=== Rugby union career ===
Davies began playing rugby union as a schoolboy playing for both Aberavon Council School and Port Talbot County School. The first notable club that Davies represented was Aberavon, and it was from Aberavon that Davies was first selected to represent the Wales national team. Davies played two international games for Wales, both as part of the 1912 Five Nations Championship. Davies' first cap was against Scotland played at St Helen's, which Wales won 21–6. Davies was selected for the next Wales match of the tournament, an away encounter to Ireland. The game started well for Wales, with Davies scoring his only international points, a try in the first half which was converted by Jack Bancroft. Despite Wales leading 5–0, the more experienced Irish team came back in the second half winning 12–5.

By the end of 1912, Davies had switched clubs from Aberavon to Swansea, and in October he was selected to play for county team Glamorgan when they faced the second touring South African team. Davies was not originally a first choice for the team, with Cardiff's Billy Spiller chosen not only as centre but also team captain. Three of the backs selected for the encounter, Spiller, Swansea centre Alf Thomas and fullback Jack Bancroft were all withdrawn injured after the teams met in a club clash the previous Saturday. Davies was called in to replace Spiller and was also given the captaincy. The match was a one-sided competition with the South Africans running out winners by 35 points to 3.

Davies played in his rugby in two parts of the United Kingdom, in Wales it was for Swansea, Glamoragn and Wales, while in the South of England he played for Exeter University, Plymouth Albion, and county rugby for Devon. In 1913 he was suspended by both Wales and Devon for alleged professionalism, and in March he decided to sever links with the union game by 'Going North' and joining Leeds R.L.F.C.

=== Rugby league honours ===
Davies won two caps for Wales while at Leeds in 1914 and 1921, and won caps for Great Britain in 1914 against Australia, and New Zealand. Davies played at centre in Leeds' 2–35 defeat by Huddersfield in the Championship Final during the 1914–15 season, and in the 11–3 victory over Dewsbury in the 1921 Yorkshire Cup Final during the 1921–22 season at Thrum Hall, Halifax on Saturday 26 November 1921.
