= Harold Edmondson =

English rugby league footballer

Personal information
- Full name: Harold Spencer Edmondson
- Born: 12 November 1903; Huddersfield, England
- Died: 1982 (aged 78–79); Halifax, West Yorkshire

Playing information
- Position: Stand-off
Club
| Years | Team | Pld | T | G | FG | P |
|---|---|---|---|---|---|---|
| 1919–22 | Bramley |
| 1922–26 | Huddesfield |
| | Total | 0 | 0 | 0 | 0 | 0 |

Harold Spencer Edmondson (12 November 1903 – c.1982) was a Huddersfield-born professional rugby league footballer who played in the 1910s and 1920s. He played at club level for Bramley and Huddersfield, as a stand-off.

== Playing career ==
=== Club career ===
Harold Edmondson, the youngest footballer to have played first-class rugby league, aged 15 years 81 days, made his début for Bramley and scored a try against Bradford Northern on Saturday 1 February 1919, he transferred from Bramley to Huddersfield during 1922, and he fractured his clavicle (collar-bone) while making a tackle on Saturday 5 September 1925, and he retired from rugby league during 1926.

According to a 2019 article by Martyn Cheney "Harold Edmondson’s claim to fame lay dormant for almost seventy years. It had generally been accepted that Harold Wagstaff at 15 years 175 days of age on his debut for Huddersfield in 1906 was the youngest player to have figured in first-class Rugby League. Waggie’s claim is now obsolete as it has been conclusively shown that Harold Edmondson, still a schoolboy, played stand-off for Bramley against Bradford Northern on 1st February 1919 aged only 15 years 81 days where he celebrated with his first try for the club in his only appearance that season."

Harold won the Yorkshire Challenge Cup Runner's Up medal when playing for Huddersfield on 24 November 1923.

== Post playing ==
After marriage to Marjorie Wilson and a successful career as a technical dyer, Harold died in Halifax in c.1982. He left two children, Christine and Peter, and five grandchildren.
