= Tommy Woods (rugby) =

English rugby union and rugby league footballer (1883–1955)

Personal information
- Full name: Thomas Woods
- Born: 9 February 1883 Bridgwater, England
- Died: 12 April 1955 (aged 72) Rochdale, England

Playing information

Rugby union
- Position: Forward
Club
Years	Team	Pld	T	G	FG	P
≤1908–09	Bridgwater & Albion
Representative
Years	Team	Pld	T	G	FG	P
≤1909–09	Somersetshire	30
1908	England	1	0	0	0	0

Rugby league
- Position: Forward
Club
Years	Team	Pld	T	G	FG	P
1909–≥22	Rochdale Hornets
Representative
Years	Team	Pld	T	G	FG	P
1911–13	England	3	0	0	0	0
1911–12	Great Britain	2	0	0	0	0

Tommy Woods (9 February 1883 – 12 April 1955) was an English dual-code international rugby union, and professional rugby league footballer who played in the 1900s, 1910s and 1920s. He played representative level rugby union (RU) for England and Somersetshire, and at club level for Bridgwater & Albion RFC, as a forward, and representative level rugby league (RL) for Great Britain and England, and at club level for Rochdale Hornets, as a forward.

== Background ==
Tommy Woods was born in 1883 in Bridgwater, and later played rugby union for Bridgwater & Albion RFC, alongside Robert Dibble and Walter Roman.

== Playing career ==
=== Challenge Cup Final appearances ===
Woods played as a forward in Rochdale Hornets' 10–9 victory over Hull F.C. in the 1921–22 Challenge Cup Final during the 1921–22 season at Headingley, Leeds on Saturday 6 May 1922, in front of a crowd of 32,596.

=== County Cup Final appearances ===
Woods played as a forward in Rochdale Hornets' 12–5 victory over Oldham in the 1911–12 Lancashire Cup Final during the 1911–12 season at Wheater's Field, Broughton, Salford on Saturday 2 December 1911, in front of a crowd of 20,000.

=== Representative honours ===
Woods won a cap for England (RU) while at Bridgwater & Albion RFC against Scotland at Inverleith on 21 March 1908, and won caps for England (RL) while at Rochdale Hornets in 1911 against Australia, in 1912 against Wales, in 1913 against Wales, and won caps for Great Britain while at Rochdale Hornets in 1911 against Australia, and in 1912 against Australia.

Woods represented Somersetshire (RU) while at Bridgwater & Albion RFC.
