= Harold Wagstaff =

Former GB & England international rugby league footballer

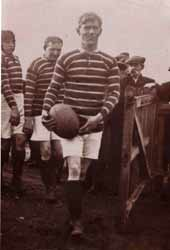

Personal information
- Full name: Harold Wagstaff
- Born: 9 May 1891 Holmfirth, West Riding of Yorkshire, England
- Died: 19 July 1939 (aged 48)

Playing information
- Position: Centre
Club
Years	Team	Pld	T	G	FG	P
1906–25	Huddersfield	436	175	12		549
Representative
Years	Team	Pld	T	G	FG	P
1908–23	Yorkshire	15	4	0		12
1910–23	England	6	5	3	0	21
1911–22	Great Britain	12	2	0	0	6

Harold Wagstaff (9 May 1891 – 19 July 1939) was an English professional rugby league footballer who played in the 1900s, 1910s and 1920s. He played as a centre and was nicknamed the Prince of Centres. A captain of Great Britain, he also played representative rugby league for England, and Yorkshire. Wagstaff has been inducted into the Rugby Football League Hall of Fame, and the Huddersfield Giants Hall of Fame.

== Background ==
Wagstaff was born in the village of Underbank within Holmfirth on 9 May 1891 and first played at local amateur side, Underbank Rangers, aged 14.

== Playing career ==
=== 1900s ===
Wagstaff's first professional game, for Huddersfield in 1906, was at the age of 15 years and 175 days. For many years he was considered to be the youngest person to play professional rugby league. However it is Harold Edmondson who holds this accolade, making his first try for Bramley against Bradford Northern on 1 February 1919 aged 15 years 81 days. Edmondson later joined Wagstaff at Huddersfield.

Wagstaff became the youngest representative in rugby league football when he turned out for Yorkshire age 17 years and 141 days, and a few months later made his début for England against the first ever touring Australian side: the 'First Kangaroos' of 1908.

=== 1910s ===
By 1912 Wagstaff was appointed captain of Huddersfield, aged 19. He captained Huddersfield at centre in their 2–8 loss against Wakefield Trinity in the 1910 Yorkshire Cup Final during the 1910–11 season at Headingley Rugby Stadium, Leeds on Saturday 3 December 1910, played at centre, and scored a try in the 22–10 victory over Hull Kingston Rovers in the 1911 Yorkshire Cup Final during the 1911–12 season at Belle Vue, Wakefield on Saturday 25 November 1911,

In 1914 Wagstaff was made captain of Great Britain, a post held during that year's tour of Australia and New Zealand. He was captain in the famous 'Rorke's Drift' match on 4 July 1914. Wagstaff played at centre and scored two tries in the 31–0 victory over Hull F.C. in the 1914 Yorkshire Cup Final during the 1914–15 season at Headingley Rugby Stadium, Leeds on Saturday 28 November 1914. During his career as the captain of the Huddersfield team, known as The Team of all The Talents, he led them to victory in the Rugby League Challenge Cup, the Championship Trophy, the Yorkshire Cup, and the Yorkshire League in 1915. They thus became the second of only three teams ever to win All Four Cups, the others being Hunslet (1908) and Swinton (1928).

Wagstaff was also stationed in Egypt during World War I.

=== 1920s ===
Wagstaff once again captained Great Britain on their 1920 tour of Australasia. In November that year, rugby league's first players' union, the 'Northern Rugby Union Players' Union was founded in Huddersfield under the chairmanship of Wagstaff, with his Huddersfield team-mate Gwyn Thomas as secretary. The enrolment fee was five shillings with a weekly contribution from each member; the declared aims of the union were (i) the promotion of the spirit of comradeship amongst the players, (ii) to redress grievances, (iii) to obtain modification of the transfer rules and (iv) to obtain benefits for players after fixed term of service.

Wagstaff played his last Test match in January 1922, when he helped Great Britain beat Australia and regain the Ashes. His career had lasted for 19 years until his retirement in 1925.

== Post-playing ==
Wagstaff was the manager of the Royal Swan Hotel, Westgate, Huddersfield, and died in 1939. In 1988 he was inducted into the British Rugby League Hall of Fame. He was one of five famous players to feature on a set of British stamps issued in 1995 to commemorate the centenary of Rugby League. Wagstaff and his contribution to Anglo-Australian rugby league culture were the subject of 2003's annual Tom Brock Lecture, given by Tony Collins.
