= John Smales =

GB international rugby league footballer

Jack Smales
Personal information
- Full name: John William Smales
- Born: first ¼ 1888; Wakefield district, England
- Died: 18 October 1930; Wakefield, England

Playing information
Club
Years	Team	Pld	T	G	FG	P
1906–20	Hunslet	256	30	1	0	92
Representative
Years	Team	Pld	T	G	FG	P
1912–13	Yorkshire	5	0	0	0	0
1914	Great Britain	0	0	0	0	0

John "Jack" Smales (first ¼ 1888 – 18 October 1930) was an English professional rugby league footballer who played in the 1900s, 1910s and 1920s. He played at representative level for Great Britain (non-test matches), and Yorkshire, and at club level for Outwood Church ARLFC, and Hunslet.

== Background ==
Jack Smales' birth was registered in Wakefield district, West Riding of Yorkshire, England, he was the landlord of The Beehive public house (demolished circa-March 1956), Kirkgate, Wakefield, whilst changing a beer barrel he accidentally came into contact with a live electrical conductor, resulting in death by electrocution, and he died aged 42 in Wakefield district, West Riding of Yorkshire, England.

== Playing career ==
=== Club career ===
Jack Smales made his début for Hunslet in 1905, and he played his last match for Hunslet against York at Clarence Street, York on Friday 2 April 1920.

Jack Smales was a member of Hunslet's 1907–08 All Four Cups winning team.

=== International honours ===
Jack Smales was selected for 1914 Great Britain Lions tour of Australia and New Zealand while at Hunslet, and played in Great Britain's non-test tour matches including; the 101-0 victory over South Australia on Friday 23 May 1914, and the 10-38 defeat by Metropolis at Sydney Cricket Ground on Saturday 6 June 1914.
