= Dave Holland (rugby) =

GB international rugby league & England international rugby union footballer

Personal information
- Full name: David Holland
- Born: 1 September 1887; Gloucester, England
- Died: 7 March 1945 (aged 57); Gloucester, England

Playing information

Rugby union
- Position: Forwards
Club
Years	Team	Pld	T	G	FG	P
≤1912–13	Gloucester RFC	97	16	1		50
Representative
Years	Team	Pld	T	G	FG	P
1912	England	3	1	0	0	3

Rugby league
- Position: Prop, Second-row, Loose forward
Club
Years	Team	Pld	T	G	FG	P
1913–21	Oldham	81	19	0	0	57
Representative
Years	Team	Pld	T	G	FG	P
1914	Great Britain	4	1	0	0	3

David Holland (1 September 1887 – 7 March 1945) was an English dual-code international rugby union, and professional rugby league footballer who played in the 1910s and 1920s. He played representative level rugby union (RU) for England, and at club level for Gloucester RFC, as a forward, and representative level rugby league (RL) for Great Britain, and at club level for Oldham, as a prop, second-row, loose forward.

== Playing career ==
=== International honours ===
Dave Holland won caps for England (RU) while at Gloucester in 1912 against Wales, Ireland, and Scotland, and won caps for Great Britain while at Oldham in 1914 against Australia (3 matches), and New Zealand.

=== Club career ===
In 1913, both Billy Hall, and Dave Holland left Gloucester RFC to join Oldham, following Alf Wood who had made the same journey in 1908. Alf Wood and Dave Holland both played at Oldham until 1921, and Billy Hall played there until 1925. All three men played in Great Britain's "Rorke's Drift" Test match against Australia in 1914, with Alf Wood kicking the four goals that would be the difference in the end.
