= Alf Wood (rugby) =

England dual-code rugby international footballer

Personal information
- Full name: Alfred Ernest Wood
- Born: 27 November 1883 Wolverhampton, England
- Died: 15 February 1963 (aged 79) Oldham, England

Playing information
- Height: 5 ft 6 1/2 in (168.9 cm)
- Weight: 12 st 3 lb (78 kg)

Rugby union
- Position: Fullback
Club
Years	Team	Pld	T	G	FG	P
190?–08	Gloucester
Representative
Years	Team	Pld	T	G	FG	P
1908	England	3		4		8

Rugby league
- Position: Fullback
Club
Years	Team	Pld	T	G	FG	P
1908–21	Oldham	248	0	349	0	698
Representative
Years	Team	Pld	T	G	FG	P
1911–14	England	2	0	2	0	4
1911–14	Great Britain	4	0	8	0	16

Alfred Ernest Wood (27 November 1883 – 15 February 1963) was an English dual-code international rugby union and professional rugby league footballer who played in the 1900s, 1910s and 1920s. He played representative level rugby union for England, and at club level for Gloucester RFC, as a fullback, and representative level rugby league for Great Britain, and at club level for Oldham, as a fullback.

== Background ==
Alf Wood was born in Wolverhampton, Staffordshire, and he died aged 79 in Oldham, Lancashire, England.

== Playing career ==
Wood won caps for England while at Gloucester RFC in 1908 against France, Wales, and Ireland. In 1908, Wood left Gloucester RFC to play rugby league for Oldham. Alf Wood played fullback, and scored 3-goals, in Oldham's 9–10 defeat by Wigan in the 1908 Lancashire Cup Final during the 1908–09 season at Wheater's Field, Broughton, Salford on Saturday 19 December 1908. Wood played fullback in Oldham's loss to Wigan in the Championship Final during the 1908–09 season. Wood played fullback in Oldham's 3–7 defeat by Wigan in the Championship Final during the 1908–09 season at The Willows, Salford on Saturday 1 May 1909, the 13–7 victory over Wigan in the Championship Final during the 1909–10 season, and the 20–7 victory over Wigan in the Championship Final during the 1910–11 season.

Wood won caps for England while at Oldham in 1911 against Australia, and in 1914 against Wales, and won caps for Great Britain (RL) while at Oldham in 1911–12 against Australia (2 matches), and in 1914 against Australia, and New Zealand. In 1913, both Billy Hall and Dave Holland left Gloucester RFC to join Oldham, following Alf Wood who had made the same journey in 1908. Alf Wood and Dave Holland both played at Oldham until 1921, and Billy Hall played there until 1925. All three men played in Great Britain's "Rorke's Drift" Test match against Australia in 1914, with Alf Wood kicking the four goals that would be the difference in the end. Alf Wood scored 1-try and 15-goals in Great Britain's 101–0 victory over South Australia in the 1914 Great Britain Lions tour match. He was also selected to go on the 1920 Great Britain Lions tour of Australia.
