= Tom McMahon Sr. =

Australian rugby league referee and coach

Personal information
- Full name: Thomas Ignatius McMahon
- Born: 1 November 1883 St Leonards, New South Wales, Australia
- Died: 26 July 1943 (aged 59) Waverley, New South Wales, Australia

Coaching information
Club
Years	Team	Gms	W	D	L	W%
1928	North Sydney	13	6	0	7	46

Refereeing information
Years	Competition	Apps
1908–26	NSWRFL

Thomas Ignatius McMahon (1 November 1883 – 26 July 1943) was a pioneering Australian international, interstate and first–grade rugby league referee. His name is often rendered as Tom McMahon senior to distinguish him from another prominent referee of the same name, but the two were not related.

== Biography ==
Born in the suburb of St Leonards on Sydney's Lower North Shore, McMahon played second–grade rugby union for North Sydney prior to picking up refereeing. He started out officiating rugby union in the City and Suburban Association.

McMahon was a referee in over 300 first–grade rugby league matches. He was the first to officiate a match at the Sydney Cricket Ground and refereed in the NSWRFL from the inaugural season in 1908 until 1926, including for three premiership deciders. His career as a referee included international fixtures during the historic 1910 Great Britain Lions tour. Between 1910 and 1926, McMahon's services were called upon every season an interstate or international series was played. He also had a season as coach of the North Sydney Bears in 1928.

McMahon died at the age of 59 in Sydney in 1943. The NSWRFL president Jersey Flegg paid tribute by describing him as "the greatest referee the game has known".
