= Jim Clampitt =

GB & England international rugby league footballer

Personal information
- Full name: James Lamb Clampitt
- Born: 1881 Millom, Cumberland, England
- Died: 12 February 1934 (aged 52) Salford, Lancashire, England

Playing information
- Position: Forward
Club
Years	Team	Pld	T	G	FG	P
1906–??	Broughton Rangers
Representative
Years	Team	Pld	T	G	FG	P
1905–20	Cumberland	25	1	0	0	3
1908–14	Great Britain	3	0	0	0	0
1909–14	England	6	3	0	0	9

James Lamb Clampitt (1881 – 12 February 1934) was an English professional rugby league footballer who played in the 1900s and 1910s. He played at representative level for Great Britain, England and Cumberland, and at club level for Broughton Rangers, as a forward.

== Background ==
James Clampitt was born in Millom, Cumberland in 1881.

== Playing career ==
=== Broughton Rangers ===
Clampitt joined Broughton Rangers from his hometown club Millom in 1906. Clampitt played as a forward in Broughton Rangers' 4-0 victory over Wigan in the 1911 Challenge Cup Final during the 1910–11 season at The Willows, Salford, in front of a crowd of 15,006.

=== International honours ===
While at Broughton Rangers Clampitt won caps for Great Britain in 1908 in the third Test match of the 1907–1908 New Zealand rugby tour of Australia and Great Britain, and again in 1911 against Australia, and he won caps for England in 1909 against Wales. He was considered a "Probable" for the 1910 Great Britain Lions tour of Australia and New Zealand, but ultimately he was not selected for the tour.

He represented England in 1911 against Wales, and Australia, in 1912 against Wales, in 1913 against Wales, in 1914 against Wales. Following the 1913–14 Northern Rugby Football Union season, Clampitt was selected to go on the 1914 Great Britain Lions tour of Australia and New Zealand, playing one Test match against New Zealand.

== Post-playing ==
In 1925, he was appointed to the Salford council as a Conservative Party representative. On 12 February 1934, he collapsed and died at a friend's house in Pendleton. His funeral took place at St Paul's Church, Kersal.
