= Rugby Football League Hall of Fame =

Sports hall of fame in Huddersfield, England

Coordinates: 53.6480°N 1.7833°W

Douglas Clark was inducted into the Hall of Fame in 2005.

The Rugby League Hall of Fame honours the leading players of the sport of rugby league. It was established by the sport's governing body in the UK, the Rugby Football League, in 1988. Players must have been retired for at least five years to be eligible; they must also have played at least ten years within the British game. Players are chosen for induction to the hall of fame by a panel consisting of sports writers, broadcasters and officials.

Inductions to the hall of fame have been sporadic. Nine players were inducted when the hall was opened in 1988 and one more was added the following year. In 1995 the members of the hall of fame appeared on postage stamps released as part of Britain's centenary celebrations. There were no new inductees until 2000, when three more players were introduced as part of the buildup to the 2000 Rugby League World Cup. A further four players were inducted in 2005, and four more in 2013 during the fourteenth World Cup.

The Hall of Fame is located at the George Hotel in Huddersfield, where a group of northern clubs met in 1895 and resolved to leave the Rugby Football Union to form their own body, which led to the development of the separate codes of rugby league and rugby union.

2022 saw the first female inductees of the Hall of Fame.

== Hall of Fame ==
=== Players ===
| Inducted | Player | Position | Club(s) |
|---|---|---|---|
| 1988 | (England) Harold Wagstaff | Centre | Huddersfield |
| 1988 | (Wales) Jim Sullivan | Fullback | Wigan |
| 1988 | (Australia) Albert Rosenfeld | Wing | Huddersfield, Wakefield Trinity, Bradford Northern, Easts |
| 1988 | (Wales) Gus Risman | Centre | Salford, Workington Town |
| 1988 | (England) Jonty Parkin | Scrum-half | Wakefield Trinity, Hull Kingston Rovers |
| 1988 | (England) Alex Murphy | Scrum-half | St. Helens, Leigh, Warrington |
| 1988 | (Wales) Billy Boston | Wing | Wigan, Blackpool Borough |
| 1988 | (Australia) Brian Bevan | Wing | Warrington |
| 1988 | (England) Billy Batten | Centre | Hull |
| 1989 | (England) Neil Fox | Centre | Wakefield Trinity, Bradford Northern, Hull Kingston Rovers, York, Huddersfield |
| 2000 | (England) Roger Millward | Stand-off | Castleford, Hull Kingston Rovers |
| 2000 | (South Africa) Tom van Vollenhoven | Wing | St. Helens |
| 2000 | (England) Vince Karalius | Loose forward | St. Helens, Widnes |
| 2005 | (England) Martin Hodgson | Second-row | Swinton |
| 2005 | (England) Ellery Hanley | Loose forward | Bradford Northern, Wigan, Leeds, Balmain, Western Suburbs |
| 2005 | (England) Douglas Clark | Loose forward | Huddersfield |
| 2005 | (England) Eric Ashton | Centre | Wigan |
| 2013 | (Wales) Lewis Jones | Stand-off | Leeds |
| 2013 | (England) Martin Offiah | Wing | Widnes, Wigan, Eastern Suburbs, St George Dragons, London Broncos, Salford City Reds |
| 2013 | (England) Mick Sullivan | Wing | Huddersfield, Wigan, St. Helens, York, Dewsbury |
| 2013 | (England) Garry Schofield | Centre, Stand-off | Hull FC, Leeds, Balmain, Western Suburbs, Doncaster, Huddersfield, Bramley |
| 2014 | (England) Mal Reilly | Loose forward | Castleford, Manly-Warringah |
| 2014 | (England) Willie Horne | Stand-off | Oldham, Barrow |
| 2015 | (England) Shaun Edwards | Scrum-half, Stand-off | Wigan, Balmain, London, Bradford |
| 2015 | (England) Albert Goldthorpe | Fullback, Stand-off | Hunslet |
| 2018 | (England) Johnny Whiteley | Loose forward | Hull, Hull Kingston Rovers |
| 2018 | (England) Derek Turner | Loose forward | Hull Kingston Rovers, Oldham, Wakefield Trinity |
| 2018 | (England) Andy Gregory | Scrum-half | Widnes, Warrington, Wigan, Leeds, Salford |
| 2022 | (Wales) David Watkins | Fullback | Salford, Swinton, Cardiff |
| 2022 | (Wales) Clive Sullivan | Wing | Hull FC, Hull KR, Oldham, Doncaster |
| 2022 | (England) Adrian Morley | Prop Second-row | Leeds, Sydney, Bradford, Warrington Wolves, Swinton Lions, Salford Red Devils |
| 2022 | (England) Andy Farrell | Second-row Loose forward | Wigan |
| 2022 | Sally Milburn | | Barrow, Askam |
| 2022 | Lisa McIntosh | | Bradford, Dudley Hill |
| 2022 | Brenda Dobek | | Wakefield Panthers, Townville, Featherstone Rovers |
| 2024 | (England) James Lomas | Wing, Centre | Bramley, Salford, Oldham, York |
| 2024 | (England) Alan Prescott | Wing, Prop, Second-row, Loose forward | Halifax, St Helens |
| 2024 | Jane Banks | | |
| 2024 | Michelle Land | | |
| 2024 | (England) Paul Sculthorpe | Loose forward, Stand-off, Second-row | Warrington, St Helens |
| 2024 | (England) Jamie Peacock | Prop, Second-row | Bradford, Leeds, Hull KR |

=== Teams ===
The 2024 player inductions also saw teams inducted for the first time. Teams to have been inducted into the Hall of Fame are:

- 2024: 1996 Great Britain Lionesses touring squad – the inaugural Great Britain women's team, the only European team to have beaten Australia in a test series at time of induction.

== See also ==
- Australian Rugby League Hall of Fame
