= Vic Banks =

New Zealand international rugby league footballer

Personal information
- Full name: William Thomas Victor Banks
- Born: 9 February 1889; Willesborough, Kent, England
- Died: 12 October 1972 (aged 83); Napier, New Zealand

Playing information
- Position: Forward
Club
Years	Team	Pld	T	G	FG	P
1912	Kia Ora	6
Representative
Years	Team	Pld	T	G	FG	P
1912	Hawke's Bay	1	0	0	0	0
1914	New Zealand	1	1	0	0	3

William Thomas Victor Banks (9 February 1889 – 12 October 1972) was a New Zealand professional rugby league footballer who played in the 1910s. He played at representative level for New Zealand, and Hawke's Bay, as a forward.

== Playing career ==
=== Kia Ora club and Hawke's Bay ===
Banks debuted for the Kia Ora club in 1914. He was selected at the end of the season for the Hawke's Bay team to play Canterbury which they lost 10-8.

=== International honours ===
Banks represented New Zealand in 1914 against Great Britain on 1 August. He played in the second row and scored a try in a 16-13 loss at the Auckland Domain before a crowd of 15,000.
