= Billy Hall (rugby) =

GB & England international rugby league footballer

- Godfrey Phillips Cigarette card featuring William Hall

Personal information
- Full name: William Hall
- Born: 27 January 1889 Gloucester, England
- Died: fourth ¼ 1964 (aged 74) Lancaster, England

Playing information
- Height: 5 ft 6.5 in (1.69 m)
- Weight: 10 st 7 lb (67 kg)

Rugby union
Club
Years	Team	Pld	T	G	FG	P
≤1913–13	Gloucester RFC

Rugby league
- Position: Centre, Stand-off
Club
Years	Team	Pld	T	G	FG	P
1913–25	Oldham	250	53	2		163
Representative
Years	Team	Pld	T	G	FG	P
1914–21	England	2	0	0	0	0
1914	Great Britain	4	0	0	0	0

William Hall (27 January 1889 – fourth ¼ 1964) was an English rugby union and professional rugby league footballer who played in the 1910s and 1920s. He played club level rugby union (RU) for Gloucester RFC, and representative level rugby league (RL) for Great Britain and England, and at club level for Oldham, as a centre or stand-off.

== Background ==
Billy Hall was born in Gloucester, Gloucestershire.

== Playing career ==
=== Club career ===
In 1913, both Billy Hall, and Dave Holland left Gloucester RFC to join Oldham, following Alf Wood who had made the same journey in 1908. Alf Wood and Dave Holland both played at Oldham until 1921, and Billy Hall played there until 1925. All three men played in Great Britain's "Rorke's Drift" Test match against Australia in 1914, with Alf Wood kicking the four goals that would be the difference in the end.

=== Championship final appearances ===
Hall played at centre in Oldham's 2–13 defeat by Wigan in the Championship Final during the 1921–22 season at The Cliff, Broughton on Saturday 6 May 1922.

=== Challenge Cup Final appearances ===
Hall played at centre in Oldham's 4–21 defeat by Wigan in the 1924 Challenge Cup Final during the 1923–24 season at Athletic Grounds, Rochdale on Saturday 12 April 1924.

=== International honours ===
Hall won caps for England (RL) while at Oldham in 1914 against Wales, in 1921 against Australia, and won caps for Great Britain (RL) while at Oldham in 1914 against Australia (3 matches), and New Zealand.

Billy played in the famous "Rorkes Drift" test against Australia in 1914, where Great Britain were level going into the third test. Great Britain was winning 9-3, and due to injuries, they were down to 10 men against 13 for the last 30 minutes. Hall was one of those injured with a concussion and came back onto the field with ten minutes to go. Great Britain was victorious and won 14–6.

== Family information ==
Billy was one of seven brothers who all played rugby union for Gloucester RFC. His older brother Charles "Charley" Hall played two tests for England (RU) in 1901 against Ireland, and Scotland.
