= 1919–20 Challenge Cup =

Rugby league competition

- Duration: 5 rounds
- Winners: Huddersfield
- Runners-up: Wigan

The 1919–20 Challenge Cup was the 20th staging of rugby league's oldest knockout competition, the Challenge Cup.

== First round ==
Date	Team one	Score one	Team two	Score two
21 Feb	Barrow	17	Hull Kingston Rovers	4
21 Feb	Batley	19	Salford	0
21 Feb	Bradford Northern	2	Oldham	2
21 Feb	Bramley	13	Wigan Highfield	0
21 Feb	Brookland	0	Halifax	55
21 Feb	Featherstone Rovers	2	Broughton Rangers	17
21 Feb	Huddersfield	19	Swinton	0
21 Feb	Hull FC	75	Hull BOCM	2
21 Feb	Hunslet	0	St Helens Recs	9
21 Feb	Keighley	5	York	7
21 Feb	Millom	5	Leeds	44
21 Feb	Rochdale Hornets	10	Dewsbury	7
21 Feb	St Helens	2	Wakefield Trinity	2
21 Feb	Warrington	9	Askham	0
21 Feb	Widnes	3	Leigh	0
21 Feb	Wigan	64	Healey St Adults	3
23 Feb	Oldham	28	Bradford Northern	3
24 Feb	Wakefield Trinity	2	St Helens	2
26 Feb	Wakefield Trinity	12	St Helens	3

== Second round ==
Date	Team one	Score one	Team two	Score two
28 Feb	Bramley	5	Broughton Rangers	3
28 Feb	Hull FC	29	Batley	10
28 Feb	Oldham	9	Warrington	0
28 Feb	Rochdale Hornets	0	Leeds	5
28 Feb	St Helens Recs	9	Barrow	2
28 Feb	Wakefield Trinity	2	Huddersfield	3
28 Feb	Widnes	4	Halifax	0
28 Feb	Wigan	35	York	5

== Quarterfinals ==
Date	Team one	Score one	Team two	Score two
13 Mar	Bramley	0	Wigan	10
13 Mar	Huddersfield	2	St Helens Recs	2
13 Mar	Oldham	9	Leeds	0
13 Mar	Widnes	0	Hull FC	3
17 Mar	St Helens Recs	6	Huddersfield	8

== Semifinals ==
Date	Team one	Score one	Team two	Score two
27 Mar	Huddersfield	17	Oldham	0
27 Mar	Wigan	12	Hull FC	5

== Final ==
Huddersfield defeated Wigan 21-10 in the Challenge Cup Final played at Headingley, Leeds in front of a crowd of 14,000.

This was Huddersfield’s third Challenge Cup final win in their third final appearance. They retained the trophy, having won the Cup in the last season before the suspension due to the First World War.
