= Percy Coldrick =

Wales dual-code international rugby footballer

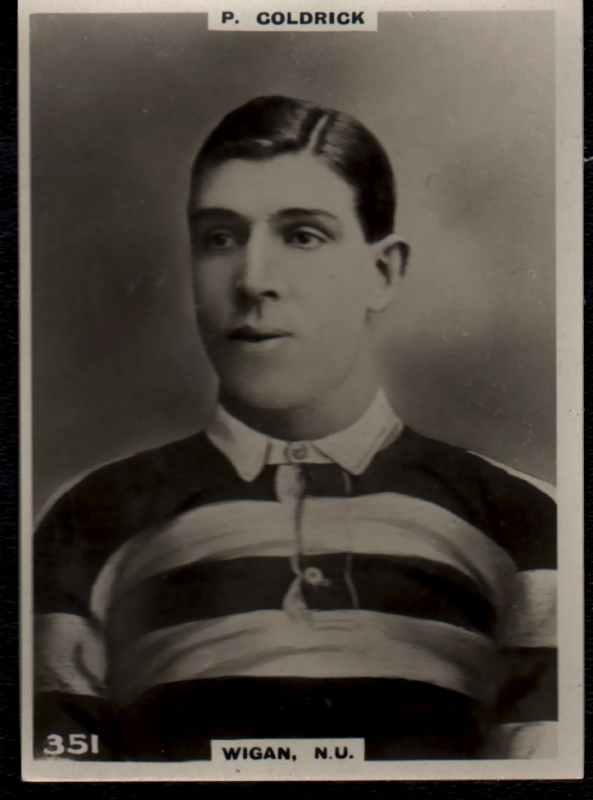
- Born: Albert Percival Coldrick; 1 November 1888 Caerleon, Wales
- Died: 26 December 1953 (aged 65) Wigan, England

Rugby union career
- Position: Prop
Amateur team(s)
Years	Team	Apps	(Points)
- Crumlin RFC
- Harlequin F.C.
1909–12	Newport RFC		
- Monmouthshire
- Western Super Mare RFC
International career
Years	Team	Apps	(Points)
1911–12	Wales	6	(0)
- Rugby league career

Playing information
- Position: Forward
Club
Years	Team	Pld	T	G	FG	P
1912–25	Wigan	280				237
1925–26	St. Helens	17				3
	Total	297	0	0	0	240
Representative
Years	Team	Pld	T	G	FG	P
1913–14	Wales	2				3
1914	Great Britain	3				3
1921	Other Nationalities	1				0
- Relatives: Percy Coldrick (son)

Albert Percival "Percy" Coldrick (born 1 November 1888 – 26 December 1953) was a Welsh dual code rugby player who played rugby union for Newport and rugby league for Wigan. He represented Wales under the union code and Wales and Great Britain under league rules.

== Rugby career ==
Coldrick birth was registered in Caerleon, Wales, he formed a trade union for rugby players, but when it attempted to organise a strike, it collapsed, his son, also named Percy Coldrick, became the General Secretary of the Transport Salaried Staffs' Association. and he died aged 64–65 in Wigan, Lancashire, England.

== Rugby career ==
Coldrick played for several teams, including a single game for Harlequins and represented Monmouthshire at county level, before being selected by Newport in 1909.

Coldrick gained his first international cap in a game against England as part of the 1911 Five Nations Championship. Under the captaincy of Billy Trew at the Swansea's St Helens Ground, Wales won the game 15–11. Coldrick was re-selected for the next game against Scotland, but failed to appear in the inaugural match in Paris. Coldrick was back for the final game in a Championship decider between Wales and Ireland and when the Welsh team won the match Coldrick became a Grand Slam and Triple Crown winning international. Coldrick played three games in the 1912 tournament, with his final rugby union international game being a contest against the French team at Rodney Parade. Although Wales beat France, eight of the fifteen Welsh squad never played for Wales again, Coldrick was one of them, though it was his own decision rather than a selection choice.

In 1912, Coldrick made himself ineligible for further selection to the Welsh union team when he switched to the professional game of rugby league, joining Wigan RLFC. Coldrick played two international games for the Welsh national league team, both against England, in 1913 and 1914. He also played for the Great Britain team. Coldrick was selected to tour with the England squad on the Ashes tour of Australia and was selected for all three tests, scoring a try in the second game. In 1919 Coldrick approached the Welsh Rugby Union to have his amateur status re-instated, though his application was refused. He left Wigan in 1925, and joined St. Helens. A shared benefit for; Percy Coldrick, Charlie Seeling and Frank Walford took place in April 1925.

Percy Coldrick played hooker in Wigan's 13–2 victory over Oldham in the Championship Final during the 1921–22 season at The Cliff, Broughton on Saturday 6 May 1922.

Percy Coldrick played left-second-row and scored a try in Wigan's 21–5 victory over Rochdale Hornets in the 1912–13 Lancashire Cup Final during the 1912–13 season at Weaste, Salford, on Wednesday 11 December 1912. and played right-second-row in the 20–2 victory over Leigh in the 1922–23 Lancashire Cup Final during the 1922–23 season at The Willows, Salford, on Saturday 25 November 1922.

=== International matches played under union code ===
Wales

- England 1911, 1912
- France 1912
- Ireland 1911
- Scotland 1911, 1912

=== International matches played under league code ===
Wales

- England 1913, 1914

Great Britain

- Australia 1914, 1914, 1914

== Bibliography ==
- Parry-Jones, David (1999). Prince Gwyn, Gwyn Nicholls and the First Golden Era of Welsh Rugby. Bridgend: seren. ISBN 1-85411-262-7.
- Smith, David; Williams, Gareth (1980). Fields of Praise: The Official History of The Welsh Rugby Union. Cardiff: University of Wales Press. ISBN 0-7083-0766-3.
