= 1912–13 Challenge Cup =

Rugby league competition

- Duration: 5 rounds
- Winners: Huddersfield
- Runners-up: Warrington

The 1912–13 Challenge Cup was the 17th staging of rugby league's oldest knockout competition, the Challenge Cup.

== First round ==
Date	Team one	Team two	Score
08 Mar	Barrow	Halifax	16–13
08 Mar	Bradford Northern	Pemberton Rovers	33–4
08 Mar	Bramley	Hull Kingston Rovers	5–18
08 Mar	Broughton Rangers	Barton	59–0
08 Mar	Dewsbury	Runcorn	18–0
08 Mar	Elland	Wakefield Trinity	2–15
08 Mar	Hull FC	Seaton Rangers	24–2
08 Mar	Keighley	Warrington	0–8
08 Mar	Normanton St John's	Oldham	4–17
08 Mar	Rochdale Hornets	Featherstone Rovers	15–3
08 Mar	St Helens	Huddersfield	0–19
08 Mar	Salford	Coventry	34–14
08 Mar	Swinton	Batley	0–3
08 Mar	Widnes	Leigh	15–3
08 Mar	Wigan	Leeds	38–0
08 Mar	York	Hunslet	2–0

== Second round ==
Date	Team one	Team two	Score
15 Mar	Barrow	Hull FC	5–8
15 Mar	Batley	Huddersfield	2–8
15 Mar	Broughton Rangers	Salford	0–2
15 Mar	Dewsbury	Oldham	10–2
15 Mar	Rochdale Hornets	Wigan	0–16
15 Mar	Wakefield Trinity	Bradford Northern	6–2
15 Mar	Warrington	Hull Kingston Rovers	13–6
15 Mar	York	Widnes	10–4

== Quarterfinals ==
Date	Team one	Team two	Score
29 Mar	Dewsbury	Hull FC	11–5
29 Mar	Salford	Warrington	4–7
29 Mar	Wakefield Trinity	York	7–3
29 Mar	Wigan	Huddersfield	5–14

== Semifinals ==
Date	Team one	Team two	Score
12 Apr	Huddersfield	Wakefield Trinity	35–2
12 Apr	Warrington	Dewsbury	17–5

== Final ==
Date	Team one	Team two	Score
26 Apr	Huddersfield	Warrington	9–5
