= 1919–20 Northern Rugby Football Union season =

- League: Championship
- Teams: 25

1919–20 Season
- Champions: Hull F.C. (1st title)
- League Leaders: Huddersfield
- Runners-up: Huddersfield
- Top point-scorer(s): (Wales) Ben Gronow ( Huddersfield) (332)
- Top try-scorer(s): (England) Stan Moorhouse ( Huddersfield) (39)

The 1919–20 Northern Rugby Football Union season was the 25th season of rugby league football.

== Season summary ==
A full championship competition returned after suspension during the First World War as well as a full Challenge Cup campaign.

Hull F.C. recorded their first Championship when they defeated Huddersfield 3-2 in the play-off final.

Huddersfield had ended the regular season as league leaders and won the Challenge Cup defeating Wigan 21-10.

Widnes won the Lancashire League and Huddersfield won the Yorkshire League. Oldham beat Rochdale Hornets 7–0 to win the Lancashire Cup, and Huddersfield beat Leeds 24–5 to win the Yorkshire County Cup.

== Championship ==
	Team	Pld	W	D	L	PF	PA	Pts	Pct
1	Huddersfield	34	29	0	5	759	215	58	85.29
2	Hull	34	25	1	8	587	276	51	75
3	Leeds	32	23	0	9	445	208	46	71.87
4	Widnes	30	21	1	8	250	115	43	71.67
5	Barrow	32	22	1	9	477	202	45	70.31
6	Halifax	34	23	1	10	390	168	47	69.12
7	Rochdale Hornets	34	22	1	11	363	203	45	66.18
8	Oldham	34	21	1	12	333	226	43	63.23
9	Dewsbury	32	18	2	12	299	262	38	59.37
10	Warrington	30	15	2	13	236	198	32	53.33
11	St Helens Recs	28	13	3	12	329	196	29	51.79
12	Batley	32	15	2	15	223	319	32	50
13	Wigan	32	15	1	16	281	266	31	48.44
14	Leigh	28	12	2	14	175	228	26	46.43
15	Salford	32	14	1	17	202	269	29	45.31
16	St. Helens	30	12	2	16	278	285	26	43.33
17	Swinton	30	12	1	17	201	274	25	41.67
18	Wakefield Trinity	32	11	4	17	229	494	26	40.62
19	Hull Kingston Rovers	32	10	2	20	250	325	22	34.37
20	Bramley	30	8	4	18	163	372	20	33.33
21	York	30	8	1	21	213	422	17	28.33
22	Hunslet	34	9	0	25	167	384	18	26.47
23	Broughton Rangers	32	7	2	23	184	460	16	25
24	Bradford Northern	32	7	1	24	177	479	15	23.44
25	Keighley	32	6	0	26	106	471	12	18.75

== Championship play-off ==
Semi-finals
1	Huddesfield	7
4	Widnes	5
2	Hull	11
3	Leeds	0

Championship final
Huddersfield	2
Hull	3

== Challenge Cup ==
Huddersfield defeated Wigan 21-10 in the Challenge Cup Final played at Headingley, Leeds in front of a crowd of 14,000.

This was Huddersfield’s third Challenge Cup Final win in their third final appearance. They retained the trophy, having won the Cup in the last season before the suspension due to the First World War.

== Sources ==
- 1919-20 Rugby Football League season at wigan.rlfans.com
- The Challenge Cup at The Rugby Football League website
