= 1911–12 Northern Rugby Football Union season =

- League: Championship
- Teams: 27

1911–12 Season
- Champions: Huddersfield (1st title)
- League Leaders: Huddersfield
- Runners-up: Wigan
- Top point-scorer(s): (England) Alf Carmichael ( Hull Kingston Rovers) (254)
- Top try-scorer(s): (Australia) Albert Rosenfeld ( Huddersfield) (76)
- Resigned from the League: Merthyr Tydfil

The 1911–12 Northern Rugby Football Union season was the 17th season of rugby league football.

== Season summary ==
Huddersfield finished the regular season as league leaders and then went on to claim their first Championship by defeating Wigan 13-5 in the play-off final.

The Challenge Cup Winners were Dewsbury who defeated Oldham 8-5.

Merthyr Tydfil dropped out of the league.

Huddersfield's Australian winger Albert Rosenfeld set a new record for tries in a season with 76.

Wigan won the Lancashire League, and Huddersfield won the Yorkshire League. Rochdale Hornets beat Oldham 12–5 to win the Lancashire Cup, and Huddersfield beat Hull Kingston Rovers 22–10 to win the Yorkshire County Cup.

== Championship ==
	Team	Pld	W	D	L	PF	PA	Pts	Pct
1	Huddersfield	36	31	1	4	996	238	63	87.5
2	Wigan	34	27	1	6	483	215	55	80.88
3	Hull Kingston Rovers	34	25	0	9	597	294	50	73.52
4	Hunslet	34	24	1	9	554	286	49	72.05
5	Oldham	34	23	1	10	562	299	47	69.11
6	Wakefield Trinity	34	22	1	11	447	405	45	66.17
7	St. Helens	32	21	0	11	527	283	42	65.62
8	Dewsbury	32	18	1	13	403	341	37	57.81
9	Broughton Rangers	34	19	1	14	322	254	39	57.35
10	Hull	38	20	3	15	449	335	43	56.57
11	Leeds	34	19	0	15	467	331	38	55.83
12	Widnes	32	16	3	13	301	242	35	54.68
13	Leigh	32	17	1	14	309	296	35	54.68
14	Halifax	34	17	3	14	377	282	37	54.41
15	Batley	32	17	0	15	267	268	34	53.12
16	Rochdale Hornets	34	16	0	18	335	397	32	47.05
17	York	32	14	1	17	307	418	29	45.31
18	Warrington	32	13	2	17	288	296	28	43.75
19	Barrow	30	12	1	17	263	425	25	41.66
20	Salford	32	11	4	17	269	324	26	40.62
21	Swinton	32	11	3	18	266	356	25	39.06
22	Keighley	28	10	1	17	253	431	21	37.5
23	Coventry	34	6	2	26	208	646	14	20.58
24	Runcorn	28	5	1	22	147	369	11	19.64
25	Ebbw Vale	30	4	3	23	168	520	11	18.33
26	Bradford Northern	36	4	0	32	250	657	8	11.11
27	Bramley	30	1	3	26	133	740	5	8.33

== Championship play-off ==
Semi-finals
1	Huddersfield	27
4	Hunslet	3
2	Wigan	41
3	Hull Kingston Rovers	3

Championship final
Huddersfield	13
Wigan	5

== Challenge Cup ==
Dewsbury defeated Oldham 8-5 at Leeds in front of a crowd of 15,271 to win their first Challenge Cup in their first Final appearance.

== Sources ==
- 1911-12 Rugby Football League season at wigan.rlfans.com
- The Challenge Cup at The Rugby Football League website
