= 1914–15 Northern Rugby Football Union season =

20th season of rugby league football

- League: Championship
- Teams: 25

1914–15 Season
- Champions: Huddersfield (3rd title)
- League Leaders: Huddersfield
- Runners-up: Leeds
- Top point-scorer(s): (Wales) Ben Gronow ( Huddersfield) (284)
- Top try-scorer(s): (Australia) Albert Rosenfeld ( Huddersfield) (56)

The 1914–15 Northern Rugby Football Union season was the 20th season of rugby league football. It featured Huddersfield's "Team of all talents" which became the second team to win all four cups.

== Season summary ==
The 1914-15 season began just a month after Britain had declared War on Germany following their invasion of Belgium in early August. Tensions across Europe had seen a full scale "World War" develop in late July but despite this the 1914-1915 season was played to its conclusion before competitive competition was finally suspended. In fact the season kicked off on 5 September, the same day the first big battle of World War I (the Battle of the Marne) began in which the Franco-British defeated the Germans.

Huddersfield finished the regular season on top of the league and added their third Championship by defeating Leeds 35-2 in the play-off final.

The Challenge Cup winners were Huddersfield who beat St Helens 37-3. In the final Huddersfield scored a Final’s record nine tries.

During their Cup run they recorded the largest win in any Cup Round when they trounced the amateurs of Swinton Park 119-2.

Wigan won the Lancashire League, and Huddersfield won the Yorkshire League. Rochdale Hornets beat Wigan 3–2 to win the Lancashire Cup, and Huddersfield beat Hull F.C. 31–0 to win the Yorkshire County Cup.

== Championship ==
	Team	Pld	W	D	L	PF	PA	Pts	Pct
1	Huddersfield	34	28	4	2	888	235	60	88.24
2	Wigan	32	25	1	6	679	206	51	79.69
3	Leeds	34	24	3	7	486	207	51	75.02
4	Rochdale Hornets	34	24	2	8	306	194	50	73.53
5	Hull	36	24	1	11	705	301	49	68.06
6	Broughton Rangers	30	18	1	11	308	289	37	61.66
7	St. Helens	32	19	0	13	368	342	38	59.37
8	Halifax	34	18	3	13	342	268	39	57.36
9	Oldham	34	17	4	13	375	301	38	55.89
10	Wakefield Trinity	32	17	1	14	309	340	35	54.69
11	Hull Kingston Rovers	34	17	2	15	374	324	36	52.94
12	Widnes	32	14	3	15	291	292	31	48.44
13	Warrington	32	14	3	15	242	323	31	48.44
14	Batley	34	15	1	18	229	288	31	45.59
15	Leigh	31	14	0	17	252	185	28	45.16
16	Swinton	30	13	1	16	171	240	27	45
17	Dewsbury	32	12	2	18	310	353	26	40.62
18	Hunslet	32	12	0	20	298	356	24	37.5
19	Bradford Northern	32	11	1	20	249	464	23	35.93
20	Bramley	32	11	1	20	143	474	23	35.93
21	Salford	30	8	4	18	134	313	20	33.33
22	Barrow	32	10	1	21	288	363	21	32.81
23	York	32	9	2	21	261	422	20	31.25
24	Keighley	30	6	2	22	120	542	14	29.37
25	Runcorn	27	0	1	26	84	590	1	1.85

== Championship play-off ==
Semi-finals
1	Huddersfield	33
4	Rochdale Hornets	2
2	Wigan	4
3	Leeds	15

Championship final
Huddersfield	35
Leeds	2

== Challenge Cup ==
Huddersfield defeated St. Helens 37-3 in the Challenge Cup Final, on 1 May, held at Watersheddings, Oldham before a crowd of 8,000.

This was Huddersfield’s second Challenge Cup win in as many Final appearances.

St Helens team - 1 Bert Roberts, 2 Tom Barton, 3 Jimmy Flanagan, 4 Tom White, 5 Henry Greenall, 6 Matt Creevey, 7 Fred Trenwith, 8 George Farrimond, 9 Sam Daniels – Try, 10 James Shallcross, 11 William Jackson, 12 Tom Durkin, 13 William Myers

== Sources ==
- 1914-15 Rugby Football League season at wigan.rlfans.com
- The Challenge Cup at The Rugby Football League website
