= 1921–22 Kangaroo tour of Great Britain =

Rugby league tour (1921–1922)

- Tour match photo taken at Barrow
- Date: 17 September 1921 – 21 January 1922
- Manager: Billy Cann and George Ball
- Coach(es): Arthur Hennessy
- Tour captain(s): Les Cubitt
Summary
P	W	D	L
Total
36	27	0	9
Test match
3	1	0	2
Opponent
P	W	D	L
Great Britain
3	1	0	2

Tour chronology
- Previous tour: 1911–12
- Next tour: 1929–30

The 1921–22 Kangaroo tour of Great Britain was the third ever Kangaroo tour. Again an Australasian side rather than an Australian team alone (although the 28-man squad featured only one New Zealander) travelled to Great Britain to contest the Ashes. Coached by Arthur Hennessy and captained by Les Cubitt, the Kangaroos travelled on the RMS Tahiti to England for best-of-three series of Test matches against Great Britain for the Ashes. The tour took place during the 1921–22 Northern Rugby Football Union season and also featured matches against several of the clubs in that competition as well as other representative teams. The tour also involved some degree of player misbehaviour, with one young footballer almost sent home from San Francisco because of all the broken glasses following a drinking session on board the team's ship.

== Touring squad ==
During 1921, the New Zealand side toured Australia, playing matches against New South Wales and Queensland, which served as selection trials for the upcoming 'Australasian' team's tour, for which only one New Zealander, Bert Laing, selected. The team wore the sky blue jersey of New South Wales and the only non-New South Welsh player to appear in a test was Queenslander Billy Richards in the third.

Billy Cann was co-manager of the Australasian touring squad along with Souths' secretary, George Ball. Secretary of the Queensland Rugby League, and football journalist Harry Sunderland also accompanied the team.

On this tour Sandy Pearce at 38 years of age became the oldest Australian international player.

=== New South Wales ===
Early in the 1921 NSWRFL season, players who were selected had to leave their clubs for the tour. All but one of the League's nine teams (University) were represented in the touring squad:

- Cec Blinkhorn, three-quarter back for North Sydney
- Frank Burge, forward for Glebe
- Harry Caples, half back for Eastern Suburbs
- George Carstairs, back for St. George
- Jimmy Craig, three-quarter back for Balmain
- (c) Les Cubitt, three-quarter back for Eastern Suburbs
- Charles Fraser, back for Balmain
- Bert Gray, forward for Glebe
- Harold Horder, three-quarter back for North Sydney
- Clarrie Ives, forward for North Sydney
- Albert Johnston, half back for St. George
- Reg Latta, forward for Balmain
- Ted McGrath, forward for South Sydney
- Rex Norman, three-quarter back for Eastern Suburbs
- Sandy Pearce, forward for Eastern Suburbs
- Herman Peters, three-quarter back for North Sydney
- Clarrie Prentice, forward for Western Suburbs
- Felix Ryan, forward for Newtown
- Bill Schultz, forward for Balmain
- Duncan Thompson, half back for North Sydney
- Dick Townsend, forward for Newtown
- Dick Vest, three-quarter back for Western Suburbs
- Jack Watkins, forward for Eastern Suburbs

=== Queensland ===
- Neville Broadfoot, three-quarter back for Queensland
- Edwin Brown, three-quarter back for Newtown (Toowoomba)
- Norm Potter, forward for Queensland
- Bill Richards, forward for Western Suburbs (Brisbane)

=== New Zealand ===
The sole New Zealand player that accompanied the Australians on tour has been listed in the Australian Rugby League's Kangaroos players register.

- Bert Laing, half back for Auckland

== Matches ==
Before sailing for England the team stopped in New Zealand for an exhibition match at the Basin Reserve in Wellington. Also during the tour, the Northern Rugby Football Union tried to arrange a match in Paris, but opposition from the RFU-aligned French Rugby Federation made it impossible.

After arriving in England, the Kangaroos played four matches against local clubs before the first Ashes test, winning all of them with dominant margins:

17 September 1921	Salford	3–48	Australasia	The Willows, Salford
	Tries: 1		Tries: 12; Goals: 6	Attendance: 9,000

20 September 1921	Keighley	0–29	Australasia	Lawkholme Lane, Keighley
			Tries: 7 Goals: 4	Attendance: 5,500

24 September 1921	Hull Kingston Rovers	6–26	Australasia	Craven Street, Hull
	Goals: 3		Tries: 6 Goals: 4	Attendance: 13,000

28 September 1921	Bradford Northern	3–53	Australasia	Birch Lane, Bradford
	Tries: 1		Tries: 15; Goals: 4	Attendance: 3,000

=== First Ashes test ===
1 October 1921

Great Britain	6–5	Australia
Tries: Squire Stockwell; Billy Stone; Goals:		Tries: Cec Blinkhorn Goals: Jim Craig (1)

Headingley, Leeds
Attendance: 31,700
Referee: Frank Renton (England)

Great Britain	Position	Australia
Gwyn Thomas	FB	Charles Fraser (c)
Billy Stone	WG	Harold Horder
Harold Wagstaff (c)	CE	Dick Vest
Jim Bacon	CE	Jim Craig
Squire Stockwell	WG	Cec Blinkhorn
Jonty Parkin	SO	Albert Johnston
Johnny Rogers	SH	Duncan Thompson
Arthur Skelhorne	PR	Clarrie Prentice
Joe Cartwright	HK	Sandy Pearce
Billy Cunliffe	PR	Felix Ryan
Jack Beames	SR	Frank Burge
Edgar Morgan	SR	Albert Gray
Jack Price	LF	Jack Watkins
	Coach

The Kangaroos' winning streak came to an end when they played against England. Australasia led 5–3 at the break and the match seemed to be theirs when Frank Burge scored a late try, but it was disallowed by referee Frank Renton. Thus, a sole second-half try from the British close to full-time was enough for them to win it.

6 October 1921	Widnes	4–28	Australasia	Lowerhouse Lane, Widnes
	Goals: 2		Tries: 6 Goals: 5	Attendance: 11,000

8 October 1921	Broughton Rangers	6–18	Australasia	The Cliff, Broughton, Salford
	Goals: 3		Tries: 4 Goals: 3	Attendance: 17,000

10 October 1921	England	5–4	Australasia	Highbury, London
	Tries: Frank Todd; Goals: Tom Clarkson (1)	[ Report]	Goals: Goals: Bert Gray (1); Duncan Thompson (1)	Attendance: 12,000

15 October 1921	Wigan	6–14	Australasia	Central Park, Wigan
3:30	Goals: J Sullivan 3		Tries: 2 Goals: 4	Attendance: 24,308

19 October 1921	Leeds	5–11	Australasia	Headingley, Leeds
	Tries: 1 Goals: 1		Tries: 3 Goals: 1	Attendance: 14,000

22 October 1921	Wakefield Trinity	3–29	Australasia	Belle Vue, Wakefield
	Tries: 1		Tries: 7 Goals: 4	Attendance: 6,000

26 October 1921	Batley	7–33	Australasia	Mount Pleasant, Batley
	Tries: 1 Goals: 2		Tries: 7 Goals: 6	Attendance: 6,000

29 October 1921	Warrington	8–5	Australasia	Wilderspool, Warrington
	Goals: 4		Tries: 1 Goals: 1	Attendance: 16,000

2 November 1921	York	9–3	Australasia	Clarence Street, York
	Tries: Farrar 1 Goals: Corsi 2 Field goals: McEwan 1		Tries: Reg Latta 1	Attendance: 3,000

At halftime York led 4–3 in a game that "was characterised by rough and scrambling play, minor injuries being numerous."

=== Second Ashes test ===
5 November 1921

Great Britain	2–16	Australia
Goals: Johnny Rogers Goals:		Tries: Cec Blinkhorn (2); Harold Horder; Dick Vest; Goals: Duncan Thompson (2)

The Boulevard, Hull
Attendance: 21,504
Referee: R. Robinson

Great Britain	Position	Australia
Gwyn Thomas	FB	Charles Fraser (c)
Billy Stone	WG	Harold Horder
Billy Batten	CE	Dick Vest
Jim Bacon	CE	George Carstairs
Squire Stockwell	WG	Cec Blinkhorn
Jonty Parkin (c)	SO	Harry Caples
Johnny Rogers	SH	Duncan Thompson
Arthur Skelhorne	PR	Bill Schultz
Joe Cartwright	HK	Sandy Pearce
Billy Cunliffe	PR	Clarrie Prentice
Jack Beames	SR	Reg Latta
Edgar Morgan	SR	Jack Watkins
Jack Price	LF	Frank Burge
	Coach

In the second Test the scores were 2-all at half-time, but after that the Australian backline of Horder, Carstairs, Vest and Blinkhorn cut loose. The Kangaroos scored 4 tries to nil, the win setting up the third and final Test as the Ashes decider. This was also the last Test in the international career of Sandy Pearce and made him the oldest ever Kangaroo.

The Kangaroos played sixteen more tour matches between the second and third Tests:

9 November 1921	Bramley	7–92	Australasia	Barley Mow, Bramley
	Tries: 1 Goals: 2		Tries: 24; Goals: 10	Attendance: 1,500

Up to and including the final Kangaroo Tour which included matches against English club sides in 1994, this would be the highest ever score by the Kangaroos. The closest The Kangaroos ever came to this score was an 80–2 win over the Sheffield Eagles in 1994.

12 November 1921	Rochdale Hornets	2–16	Australasia	Athletic Grounds, Rochdale
	Goals: 1		Tries: 4 Goals: 4	Attendance: 12,000

16 November 1921	Swinton	9–0	Australasia	Chorley Road, Swinton
	Tries: 1 Goals: 3			Attendance: 6,000

19 November 1921	Huddersfield	2–36	Australasia	Fartown, Huddersfield
	Goals: 1		Tries: 8 Goals: 6	Attendance: 12,000

23 November 1921	St. Helens	8–16	Australasia	Knowsley Road, St. Helens
	Tries: 2 Goals: 1		Tries: 4 Goals: 2	Attendance: 6,000

26 November 1921	Oldham	5–16	Australasia	Watersheddings, Oldham
	Tries: 1 Goals: 1		Tries: 4 Goals: 2	Attendance: 15,000

30 November 1921	Lancashire	6–29	Australasia	Goodison Park, Liverpool
	Tries: 2 Goals: 0		Tries: 6 Goals: 4	Attendance: 17,000

3 December 1921	Barrow	15–24	Australasia	Little Park, Roose, Barrow
	Tries: 3 Goals: 3		Tries: 6 Goals: 3	Attendance: 8,000

7 December 1921	Yorkshire	8–24	Australasia	Belle Vue, Wakefield
	Tries: 2 Goals: 1		Tries: 6 Goals: 3	Attendance: 6,000

10 December 1921	Wales	16–21	Australasia	Taff Vale Park, Pontypridd
	Goals: Tommy Howley, Johnny Rogers; Goals: Ben Gronow (4); Jim Sullivan (1)	[ Report]	Tries: Cec Blinkhorn, Frank Burge, Jim Craig, Harold Horder, Albert Johnston; Goals: Duncan Thompson (3)	Attendance: 13,000

14 December 1921	Lancashire	8–6	Australasia	Wilderspool, Warrington
	Tries: 2 Goals: 1		Tries: 2	Attendance: 6,000

17 December 1921	Dewsbury	13–6	Australasia	Old Crown Flatt ground, Dewsbury
	Tries: 3 Goals: 2		Tries: 2	Attendance: 6,000

21 December 1921	Leigh	4–17	Australasia	Mather Lane, Leigh
	Goals: 2		Tries: 5 Goals: 1	Attendance: 5,000

24 December 1921	Hull F.C.	10–21	Australasia	The Boulevard, Hull
	Tries: 2 Goals: 2		Tries: 5 Goals: 3	Attendance: 12,000

27 December 1921	Widnes	8–17	Australasia	Lowerhouse Lane, Widnes
	Tries: 2 Goals: 1		Tries: 5 Goals: 1	Attendance: 12,000

31 December 1921	Halifax	6–35	Australasia	Thrum Hall, Halifax
	Tries: 2		Tries: Cec Blinkhorn 3 Felix Ryan 1 Bill Richards 1 Bert Laing 1 Harold Horder 1 Clarrie Prentice 1 Duncan Thompson 1 Goals: J Craig 3 Field goal J Craig 1	Attendance: 12,000

Among those present for this match was the UK's Speaker of the House of Commons, J. H. Whitley. The half-time score was 18–3 to the visitors, who were without Dick Vest due to ill health.

2 January 1922	Hunslet	10–19	Australasia	Parkside, Hunslet
	Tries: 2 Goals: 2		Tries: 5 Goals: 2	Attendance: 3,174

7 January 1922	Cumberland	12–25	Australasia	Lonsdale Park, Workington
	Tries: 2 Goals: 3		Tries: 7 Goals: 2	Attendance: 5,000

=== Third Ashes test ===
14 January 1922

Great Britain	6–0	Australia
Tries: Herman Hilton; F Gallagher; Goals:		Tries: Goals:

The Willows, Salford
Attendance: 22,000
Referee: R. Jones

Great Britain	Position	Australia
Gwyn Thomas	FB	Charles Fraser (c)
Danny Hurcombe	WG	Cec Blinkhorn
Jim Bacon	CE	Dick Vest
Harold Wagstaff (c)	CE	George Carstairs
Jim Owen	WG	Harold Horder
John Greenall	SO	Harry Caples
Johnny Rogers	SH	Duncan Thompson
Arthur Skelhorne	PR	Bill Schultz
Joe Cartwright	HK	Clarrie Prentice
Billy Cunliffe	PR	Felix Ryan
Herman Hilton	SR	Reg Latta
Bob Taylor	SR	Bill Richards
Frank Gallagher	LF	Frank Burge
	Coach

The decider was played on a heavy, snow-bound field, much to the dismay of the fleet-footed Kangaroos. Early in the match the Australians were reduced to twelve men when Chook Fraser suffered a broken leg. In what was described as "a bruising encounter", Herman Hilton took a pass from his captain, the "prince of centres", Harold Wagstaff to dive over, taking two defenders over the try-line with him. The final score was 6–0 to the home side. By winning this third and deciding test of the series, Britain claimed the Ashes.

16 January 1922	Oldham	15–5	Australasia	Watersheddings, Oldham
	Tries: 3 Goals: 5		Tries: 1 Goals: 1	Attendance: 6,000

21 January 1922	St Helens Recs	5–16	Australasia	City Road, St. Helens
	Tries: 1 Goals: 1		Tries: 4 Goals: 2	Attendance: 5,000

By the end of the tour, Australian three-quarter, Cec Blinkhorn, had scored 39 tries in 29 matches, which still stands as the record for most tries scored on a Kangaroo tour. The other winger, Harold Horder scored 35, and forward Frank Burge was not far behind with 33 tries from 23 games.

The team travelled back to Australia on the Orvieto, arriving in Fremantle in February 1922. Upon their return to Sydney a large dinner was held for the tourists by the New South Wales Rugby Football League, which was attended by the likes of Sir Joynton Smith, to celebrate the players' courageous effort and the fact that this was the first team to return to Sydney with a profit.
