= List of uncapped Great Britain national rugby league team players =

Since their first game in 1908, over 700 players have represented Great Britain in a rugby league senior international match. An additional 77 players have played at least one game for Great Britain, but have never been awarded a cap by the team. The majority of this number were players selected for tours of the Southern Hemisphere, but only made non-Test appearances against provincial teams.

Nearly half of Great Britain's uncapped players have represented other teams at international level, mostly England and Wales.

== Players ==
Name	Tour	National Team	Ref(s)
Harry Archer	1958	–	
Ray Ashton	1984	–	
Jack Bartholomew	1910	–	
Jack Bates	1974	–	
Jack Booth	n/a	–	(Note: Played for Great Britain in the Festival of Britain exhibition match against Australia in 1951.)
David Bradbury	1996	Ireland	
Jack Broome	n/a	England	
Albert Burge	1910	Australia (Note: Burge was capped by Australia, but in rugby union.)	(Note: Was not part of the original touring squad, but appeared as a guest player against Newcastle.)
John Burke	1979	–	
John Butler	1974	–	
Conrad Byrne	1910	New Zealand	
Terry Cook	n/a	Wales	
Gary Cooper	1962	–	
Geoff Crewdson	1966	–	
Jason Critchley	1996	England / Wales	
Gwyn Davies	1936	Wales	
Ivor Davies	1932	–	
Don Devereux	n/a	Wales (Note: Devereux was capped by Wales, but in rugby union.)	(Note: Played for Great Britain in a trial game prior to the 1960 Rugby League World Cup.)
Jim Devereux	1910	Australia	
Oliver Dolan	1928	England	
Carl Dooler	1966	–	
Joe Doyle	1920	–	
Harold Ellerington	1936	England	
Mick Exley	1936	England	
Fred Farrar	1910	–	
Dan Frawley	1910	Australia	
Alfred Francis	1914	–	
Peter Glynn	1979	England	
Walter Gowers	1928	–	
Walter Guerin	1914	–	
Ben Halfpenny	1928	England	
Graeme Hallas	1992	–	
Neil Harmon	1996	Ireland	
John Henderson	1954	England	
Eric Hesketh	n/a	–	
Alan Hodkinson	1977	–	
Sam Houghton	1914	–	(Note: Houghton was the son of the tour manager, Joseph Houghton. He was granted permission to play for the team against Wellington due to a shortage of available players in the touring party.)
Ryan Hudson	n/a	–	(Note: Played for Great Britain against a New Zealand Residents team in 2003)
Fred Hughes	1946	Wales	
Colin Hutton	1962	–	
Mel James	1979	Wales	
Chick Jenkins	1910	Wales	
Harold Jones	1936	Wales	
Jim Lewthwaite	1946	England	
Graham Liptrot	1979	England	
Sammy Lloyd	1977	–	
David Lyon	1990	–	
Tommy Martyn	1979	England	
Nathan McAvoy	1996	England	
Andy Morton	1910	Australia	
David Myers	1992	–	
Danny Naughton	1950	England	
Ken Noble	1962	–	
Jack O'Garra	1914	–	
Frank Osmond	1950	Wales	
Russ Pepperell	n/a	England	
Paul Prendiville	n/a	Wales	(Note: Appeared for Great Britain in an exhibition played in Venice against France in 1982.)
Steve Prescott	1996	England / Ireland	
George Rees	1920	–	
Billy Reid	1920	England	
Gilbert Robinson	1932	–	
Walter Roman	1914	England	
Jon Roper	1996	England	
Mel Rosser	1928	Wales	
Roger Simpson	1990	England	
Ian Smales	1990	–	
John Smales	1914	–	
Charlie Stone	1979	England	
Ray Tabern	n/a	–	
John Taylor	1962	–	
Tulsen Tollett	1996	–	
Stan Whitty	1924	–	
Ian Wilkinson	1988	–	
John Wilson	1920	–	(Note: Wilson was one of the tour managers on the 1920 Lions tour)
John Wood	n/a	–	
Paul Wood	n/a	England	
Bill Wookey	1958	–	
