= 1920 Great Britain Lions tour =

- Manager: S. Foster and J. Wilson
- Tour captain(s): Harold Wagstaff
- Top point scorer(s): Ben Gronow (136)
- Top try scorer(s): Billy Stone (24)
Summary
P	W	D	L
Total
25	21	0	4
Test match
6	4	0	2
Opponent
P	W	D	L
Australia
3	1	0	2
New Zealand
3	3	0	0

Tour chronology
- Previous tour: 1914
- Next tour: 1924

The 1920 Great Britain Lions tour was the third British national rugby league team or 'Lions' tour of Australasia, where it was winter and matches were played against the Australian and New Zealand national sides, as well as several local teams. In Australia, the three-Test match series was won by the hosts. In New Zealand another three-Test series was played and won by the visitors. The tour was a success and brought in a handsome profit.

== Touring squad ==
At the 1919–20 Northern Rugby Football Union season's conclusion, the following Great Britain squad was assembled by the Northern Rugby Football Union to represent it on the tour of Australasia. Mr S Foster and Mr J Wilson were the team managers. Although it was a Great Britain tour, the team played as 'England' during the games.

England

- Joe Bowers, forward for Rochdale Hornets
- Joe Cartwright, hooker for Leigh
- Douglas Clark, forward for Huddersfield
- Billy Cunliffe, forward for Warrington
- Joe Doyle, three-quarter back for Barrow
- Frank Gallagher, forward for Dewsbury
- Herman Hilton, forward for Oldham
- Arthur Johnson, forward for Widnes
- Ernest Jones, half back for Rochdale Hornets
- Alf Milnes, hooker for Halifax
- Jonty Parkin, half back for Wakefield Trinity
- William Reid, forward for Widnes
- Arthur Skelhorne, forward for Warrington
- Cyril Stacey, fullback for Halifax
- Squire Stockwell, three-quarter back for Leeds
- Billy Stone, three-quarter back for Hull
- Harold Wagstaff (captain), three-quarter back for Huddersfield
- Alf Wood, fullback for Oldham

Wales

- Jim Bacon, three-quarter back for Leeds
- Evan Davies, three-quarter back for Oldham
- Ben Gronow, forward for Huddersfield
- Danny Hurcombe, three-quarter back for Wigan
- Bobby Lloyd, half back for Halifax
- George Rees, player for Leeds
- Johnny Rogers, half back for Huddersfield
- Gwyn Thomas (vice-captain), fullback for Huddersfield

== Australia ==
The first leg of the tour was Australia, where the game of rugby league football was in its twelfth year since splitting away from rugby union in 1908. The tour included places such as Orange, Bundaberg, Rockhampton, Toowoomba and Tamworth as well as the standard main venues of Brisbane, Newcastle, Sydney and Ipswich.

=== Test venues ===
The three Ashes series tests took place at the following venues.

Brisbane	Sydney	Sydney
Brisbane Exhibition Ground	Sydney Cricket Ground	Royal Agricultural Showground
Capacity: 35,000	Capacity: 60,000	Capacity: 50,000

The opening match of the tour on 5 June took place between rounds 5 and 6 of the fifteen-round 1920 NSWRFL season, and saw a Metropolis (Sydney) team host the tourists at the Sydney Cricket Ground.

Saturday, 5 June

Metropolis	20 – 27	Northern Union
Tries: Harold Horder (3), George McGowan Goals: Harold Horder (3); Charles Fraser (1)	Database; Program	Tries: Johnny Rogers (2), Squire Stockwell (2), Arthur 'Chick' Johnson; Goals: Ben Gronow (6)

Sydney Cricket Ground, Sydney
Attendance: 65,000
Referee: Tom McMahon Sr.

In front of an overflow crowd of 65,000 the visitors ran out 27–20 winners.

Wednesday, 9 June

Orange	8 – 50	Northern Union
Tries: T. Dalton (2) Goals: C. Plowman (1)	Database; Report	Tries: Jim Bacon (4), Danny Hurcombe (2), William Reid, Joe Bowers, Joe Doyle, Herman Hilton, Cyril Stacey; Goals: Alf Wood (7)

Wade Park, Orange
Attendance: 3,000
Referee: E. Allen

As the preliminary match to the New South Wales versus Britain game on 12 June, Sydney University's first intervarsity match against Queensland University under rugby league rules was played before a crowd of 60,000. Sydney won 26–14.

Saturday, 12 June

New South Wales	42 – 6	Northern Union
Tries: Frank Burge (2), Charles Fraser, Herb Gilbert, Reg Latta, George McGowan, Sandy Pearce, Jack 'Junker' Robinson; Goals: Frank Burge (9)	Database; Program	Tries: Goals: Ben Gronow (3)

Sydney Cricket Ground, Sydney
Attendance: 60,000
Referee: Tom Dickenson

Albert Johnston captained New South Wales in two matches against the visiting Lions.

Wednesday, 16 June

New South Wales	10 – 18	Northern Union
Tries: Viv Farnsworth, Jack 'Junker' Robinson; Goals: Charles Fraser (1); Ray Norman (1)	Database; Program	Tries: Herman Hilton, William Reid; Goals: Ben Gronow (6)

Sydney Cricket Ground, Sydney
Attendance: 55,000
Referee: Tom McMahon Sr.

Saturday, 19 June

Queensland	15 – 25	Northern Union
Tries: Neville Broadfoot, Walter Paten, Bill Richards; Goals: Henry Fewin (1); Walter Paten (1); Bill Richards (1)		Tries: Jim Bacon (4), Squire Stockwell; Goals: Ben Gronow (5)

Brisbane Exhibition Ground, Brisbane
Attendance: 20,000
Referee: Laurie Kearney

On Saturday, 19 June, the tourists played a match against Queensland before a crowd of around 20,000 at the Brisbane Exhibition Ground. The Queensland side featured Mick Bennett, Neville Broadfoot, Jeff Daly, Harry Fewin, Thomas Johnson, Jack Maguire, Patrick Moran, Claud O'Donnell, Walter Paten, Norm Potter, Bill Richards, Stan Ryan, E. Sabine, Colin Thompson, and J. Thompson. The British team was F G Thomas, J A Bacon, J Doyle, H Wagstaff, F Stockwell, R Lloyd, J Rogers, H Hilton, W Reid, G Rees, R Gronow, E Milnes and E Johnston. Refereed by L H Kearney, the visitors, after leading 13–10 at half-time, won the game 25–15.

Monday, 21 June

Wide Bay	13 – 34	Northern Union
Tries: J. Bradley, F. Heidke, W. Marles; Goals: A. Toft (2)	Database; Report	Tries: Harold Wagstaff (2), Jim Bacon, Herman Hilton, Jonty Parkin, Squire Stockwell, Billy Stone; Goals: Ben Gronow (5)

The Reserve, Bundaberg
Attendance: 4,000
Referee: Les Tallon

Tuesday, 22 June

Central Queensland	15 – 26	Northern Union
Tries: C. Bannon, T. Barnes, G. Price; Goals: D. McIvor (3)	Database; Report	Tries: Billy Cunliffe, Evan Davies, Ernest Jones, William Reid, Arthur Skelhorne, Squire Stockwell; Goals: Alf Wood (4)

George Street Ground, Rockhampton
Referee: W. Thorpe

Thursday, 24 June

Ipswich	12 – 40	Northern Union
Tries: Jim McBrien, Colin Thompson; Goals: Walter Paten (3)	Database; Report	Tries: Joe Doyle (2), Cyril Stacey (2), Squire Stockwell (2), Jim Bacon, Bobby Lloyd, William Reid; Goals: Ben Gronow (3); Alf Wood (2)

North Ipswich Reserve, Ipswich
Attendance: 5,000
Referee: H. Francis

=== First test ===
The first test of the 1920 Ashes series was played on the 26th of June at the Brisbane Exhibition Ground before a crowd of 32,000. It was refereed by local whistleblower Laurie Kearney. Albert Johnston was selected to captain Australia in the opening Test of the series in the absence of champion centre Herb Gilbert. Despite a last minute reshuffling of the team which saw Johnston move to halfback.

Saturday, 26 June

Australia	8 – 4	(United Kingdom) Northern Union
Tries: Frank Burge; Charles Fraser; Goals: Harold Horder (1)		Tries: Goals: Ben Gronow (2)

Brisbane Exhibition Ground, Brisbane
Attendance: 32,000
Referee: Laurie Kearney (Australia)

Australia	Posit.	Northern Union
Harry Fewin	FB	Gwyn Thomas
Dick Vest	WG	Billy Stone
Viv Farnsworth	CE	Danny Hurcombe
Neville Broadfoot	CE	Harold Wagstaff (c)
Harold Horder	WG	Jim Bacon
Charles Fraser	SO	Johnny Rogers
Albert Johnston (c)	SH	Jonty Parkin
Norm Potter	PR	Arthur Johnson
Sandy Pearce	HK	Alf Milnes
Bill Schultz	PR	Ben Gronow
Bill Richards	SR	Frank Gallagher
Frank Burge	SR	Herman Hilton
Bert Gray	LF	Douglas Clark

Australia won the match 8–4.

Monday, 28 June

Toowoomba	28 – 48	Northern Union
Tries: Edwin Brown, G. Hawthorne, L. Melbusch, Fred Prouton, W. Smith; Goals: Fred Prouton (3); Edwin Brown (2)	Database; Report	Tries: Billy Stone (5), Harold Wagstaff (2), William Reid, Cyril Stacey, Squire Stockwell; Goals: Alf Wood (9)

Athletic Oval, Toowoomba
Attendance: 3,000
Referee: J. Steele

=== Second test ===
Albert Johnston lost the Australian captaincy on Herb Gilbert's return and played at five-eighth in the second Ashes Test. The match was played on the 3rd of July at the Sydney Cricket Ground and attracted 67,739 spectators, then a record attendance for any sport at the SCG.

Saturday, 3 July

Australia	21 – 8	(United Kingdom) Northern Union
Tries: Viv Farnsworth; Herb Gilbert; Harold Horder; Norm Potter; Dick Vest; Goals: Frank Burge (1); Harold Horder (1); Field Goals: Charles Fraser	Database; Program	Tries: Frank Gallagher; Arthur Johnson Goals: Ben Gronow (1)

Sydney Cricket Ground, Sydney
Attendance: 40,000
Referee: Tom McMahon Sr. (Australia)

Australia	Posit.	Northern Union
Charles Fraser	FB	Gwyn Thomas
Dick Vest	WG	Jim Bacon
Viv Farnsworth	CE	Harold Wagstaff (c)
Herb Gilbert (c)	CE	Danny Hurcombe
Harold Horder	WG	Billy Stone
Albert Johnston	SO	Johnny Rogers
Duncan Thompson	SH	Bobby Lloyd
Bill Schultz	PR	Ben Gronow
Sandy Pearce	HK	Alf Milnes
Norm Potter	PR	Arthur Johnson
Frank Burge	SR	Herman Hilton
Bert Gray	SR	Douglas Clark
Bill Richards	LF	Frank Gallagher

Australian halfback Duncan Thompson starred in the match, which was won by the hosts 21–8. With this Australia secured the Ashes for the first time on home soil.

Wednesday, 7 July

Tamworth	10 – 27	Northern Union
Tries: H Hassan, Ted Taplin Goals: J Orchard (2)	Database; Report	Tries: Jonty Parkin (3), Evan Davies (2), Frank Gallagher, Herman Hilton; Goals: Ben Gronow (3)

Tamworth Oval, Tamworth
Attendance: 3,000
Referee: H. Flynn

=== Third test ===
The third Test was played on the 10th of July in Sydney, with Great Britain winning 23–13.

Saturday, 10 July

Australia	13 – 23	(United Kingdom) Northern Union
Tries: Frank Burge; Bert Gray; Duncan Thompson; Goals: Frank Burge (2)	Database; Program	Tries: Herman Hilton (2); Billy Stone (2); Jim Bacon; Goals: Johnny Rogers (3); Squire Stockwell (1)

RAS Showground, Sydney
Attendance: 32,000
Referee: Tom McMahon Sr. (Australia)

Australia	Posit.	Northern Union
Charles Fraser	FB	Gwyn Thomas (c)
Dick Vest	WG	Johnny Rogers
Viv Farnsworth	CE	Billy Stone
Herb Gilbert (c)	CE	Jim Bacon
Harold Horder	WG	Squire Stockwell
Albert Johnston	SO	Ernest Jones
Duncan Thompson	SH	Jonty Parkin
Norm Potter	PR	Arthur Skelhorne
Sandy Pearce	HK	Joe Cartwright
Bill Schultz	PR	Billy Cunliffe
Frank Burge	SR	Herman Hilton
Bert Gray	SR	Douglas Clark
Bill Richards	LF	Frank Gallagher

Wednesday, 25 August

Newcastle	10 – 17	Northern Union
Tries: P. Gray, H. Williams; Goals: Dan Davies (1); H. Williams (1)	Database; Report	Tries: Jonty Parkin (2), Jim Bacon, Evan Davies, Danny Hurcombe; Goals: Arthur Johnson (1)

Newcastle Showgrounds, Newcastle
Attendance: 2,000
Referee: E. Brien

The British also played two matches against a Newcastle rugby league team that featured Dan "Laddo" Davies. The first game was on the 25th of August and the tourists won 17–10. The second was on the 28th which they also won 24–3.

Saturday, 28 August

Newcastle	3 – 24	Northern Union
Tries: William Bell; Goals:	Database; Report	Tries: Bobby Lloyd, Evan Davies, Ben Gronow, Herman Hilton, Ernest Jones; Goals: Ben Gronow (3)

Newcastle Number 1 Sports Ground, Newcastle
Attendance: 12,000
Referee: E. Brien

== New Zealand ==
The British team played a three-Test series against New Zealand just as it did against Australia. Karl Ifwerson captained the Kiwis against the tourists.

After losing their first game to Auckland, the tourists won all three Tests.

In the Test at Wellington, the British were behind on the scoreboard 10–0, but made it 10–6 before Douglas Clark forced his way over the line for the match-winning try which Ben Gronow converted, giving the visitors an 11–10 victory.

The second Test was played in Christchurch on Saturday, 7 August, and was won by the tourists 19 points to 3.

Both the game against Auckland and the final Test versus the Lions attracted nearly 40,000 spectators to Auckland's Domain ground – the biggest ever New Zealand sporting crowds to that time.

Tuesday 3 August the touring England side played a mid week match against a King Country XIII in Taumarunui in front of a 4000 strong Crowd at Taumarunui Domain. England won easily 47–3. Wagstaffe scored twice in the first half for the visitors along with one a piece for Stockwell and Milne. Doran got one back for King Country. The halftime score was 16–3. In the 2nd spell, Stockwell scored 2 tries and Wagstaffe, Bowers, Doyle and Johnston one each. The final score was 47–3.
