= 1918–19 Lancashire Cup =

- Structure: Regional knockout competition
- Teams: 12
- Winners: Rochdale Hornets
- Runners-up: Oldham

The 1918–19 Lancashire Cup was the eleventh competition for this regional rugby league tournament and the first since 1914–15. This quickly arranged competition was won by the holders Rochdale Hornets who beat local rivals Oldham in the final at The Willows, Salford by a score of 22–0.

== Background ==
The shortened 1918–19 (February–May) season began less than three months after the end of the First World War and the armistice of Compiègne.

A Wartime Emergency League had been operating since September 1918. This was cancelled, and the programme started tailing off in January 1919. A new shortened season was introduced with the traditional Lancashire and Yorkshire leagues, to cut travel costs and minimise the use of precious resources. The return of the Challenge Cup would have to wait until the following 1919–20 season, but the Northern Union did manager to re-introduce both the County Cups.

One pre-war club was lost – Runcorn, one of the founder members after the great schism of 1895, after taking part in the previous Wartime Emergency League, withdrew and folded. They were replaced by St Helens Recs (effectively the works team for Pilkington Glass) who had entered the 1915–16 Wartime Emergency League and took place in this, their first, Lancashire Cup.

The number of teams entering this year's competition was again 12 with four byes in the first round.

== Competition and results ==
=== Round 1 ===
Involved 4 matches (with four byes) and 12 clubs

Game No	Fixture date	Home team	Score	Away team	Venue	Att	Rec	Notes	Ref
1	Sat 5 April 1919	Broughton Rangers	8–23	St Helens Recs	The Cliff			1	
2	Sat 5 April 1919	Leigh	5–12	Widnes	Mather Lane				
3	Sat 5 April 1919	Rochdale Hornets	7–5	Salford	Athletic Grounds				
4	Sat 5 April 1919	St. Helens	11–5	Warrington	Knowsley Road				
5		Barrow		bye					
6		Oldham		bye					
7		Wigan		bye					
8		Swinton		bye					

=== Round 2 – quarterfinals ===
Game No	Fixture date	Home team	Score	Away team	Venue	Att	Rec	Notes	Ref
1	Sat 12 April 1919	Barrow	6–0	Widnes	Little Park, Roose			2	
2	Sat 12 April 1919	Oldham	16–8	St. Helens	Watersheddings	3,000			
3	Sat 12 April 1919	St Helens Recs	2–16	Rochdale Hornets	City Road				
4	Sat 12 April 1919	Wigan	18–0	Swinton	Central Park				

=== Round 3 – semifinals ===
Game No	Fixture date	Home team	Score	Away team	Venue	Att	Rec	Notes	Ref
1	Sat 26 April 1919	Barrow	3–7	Oldham	Little Park, Roose				
2	Sat 26 April 1919	Rochdale Hornets	40–0	Wigan	Athletic Grounds				

=== Final ===
The attendance at the final was 18,617 and receipts £1,365.

10 May 1919

Rochdale Hornets	22 – 0	Oldham
Tries: Fairhurst, Hopwood, Jones, Woods, Carter (2); Goals: Hopwood, Jones

The Willows, Salford
Attendance: 18,617
Referee: A. Hestford (Broughton)

==== Teams and scorers ====
Rochdale Hornets	№	Oldham
	Teams	
George Hesketh	1	Alf Wood
Jack Hopwood	2	James Parkinson
Jack Corsi	3	Evan Davies
George Prudence	4	George Evans
Jim Fairhurst	5	Jack Wiltshire
Jack Heaton	6	Billy Hall
Ernest Jones	7	Tom Taylor
Joe Bowers	8	Rothwell Marlor
Jack Fitzsimmons	9	Joe Ferguson
William Richardson	10	Bill Biggs
Sam Carter	11	Ernest Forshaw
Tommy Woods	12	Herman Hilton
Jack Bennett	13	Harry Carter

Scoring – Try = three (3) points – Goal = two (2) points – Drop goal = two (2) points

=== The road to success ===
First round
Broughton Rangers	8
St Helens Recs	23
Rochdale Hornets	7
Salford	5
Wigan
bye
Swinton
bye
Barrow
bye
Leigh	5
Widnes	12
Oldham
bye
St. Helens	11
Warrington	5

Second round
St Helens Recs	2
Rochdale Hornets	16
Wigan	18
Swinton	0
Barrow	6
Widnes	0
Oldham	16
St. Helens	8

Semifinals
Rochdale Hornets	40
Wigan	0
Barrow	3
Oldham	7

Final
Rochdale Hornets	22
Oldham	0

== Notes and comments ==
- 1 The first game played in the Lancashire Cup by the "new" club.
- 2 The first Lancashire Cup match played at Barrow's "new" ground.
- 3 The Willows was the home ground of Salford.

== See also ==
- 1918–19 Northern Rugby Football Union season
