= List of one-club men in rugby league =

A one-club man in rugby league football is a player who spends his or her entire professional career with only one club. The term is often used in the context of team sports such as football or rugby.

== Former players (Pre SL and NRL Era) ==
Players who spent their whole career with one club (making 100 or more appearances, or playing 10 or more seasons) include:

Name	Nationality	Club	From	To	Seasons	Games
Eric Ashton	England	Wigan	1955	1969	15	497
Fred Ashworth	England	Oldham	1926	1939	13	436
Arthur Atkinson	England	Castleford	1926	1942	16	431
Jim Bacon	Wales	Leeds	1918	1928	11	276
Ray Batten	England	Leeds	1963	1976	14	434
Craig Bellamy	Australia	Canberra Raiders	1982	1992	11	148
Ernest Brooks	England	Warrington	1902	1920	18	297
William Burgess	England	Barrow	1919	1933	14	464
Bill Carson	Australia	Western Suburbs (Sydney)	1954	1964	11	118
Douglas Clark	England	Huddersfield	1909	1927	17	485
Mike Coulman	England	Salford	1968	1983	16	463
Bob Craig	Australia	Balmain	1910	1919	10	92
David Davies	Wales	Salford	1936	1952	17	370
Evan Davies	Wales	Oldham	1911	1926	15	321
Mike Elliott	Wales	Oldham	1962	1979	17	446
Karl Fairbank	England	Bradford Northern	1986	1996	11	n/a
Frank Farrell	Australia	Newtown	1938	1951	14	250
Joe Ferguson	England	Oldham	1899	1923	22	627
Keith Fielding	England	Salford	1973	1983	11	319
Jack Fish	England	Warrington	1898	1911	18	321
Trevor Foster	England	Bradford Northern	1938	1955	18	432
Jake Friend	Australia	Sydney Roosters	2008	2021	13	261
Donald Froggett	England	Wakefield Trinity	1948	1959	11	219
Reg Gasnier	Australia	St George Dragons	1959	1967	9	125
Alex Glenn	New Zealand	Brisbane Broncos	2009	2021	12	282
Albert Goldthorpe	England	Hunslet	1888	1910	22	682
Parry Gordon	England	Warrington	1961	1981	20	543
Mike Gregory	England	Warrington	1982	1994	22	222
Jonathan Griffiths	Wales	St Helens R.F.C.	1989	1995	7	140
Howard Hallett	Australia	South Sydney	1909	1924	16	155
Ernie Hammerton	Australia	South Sydney	1947	1958	11	157
Paul Harragon	Australia	Newcastle Knights	1988	1999	12	169
Gerry Helme	England	Warrington	1945	1957	11	442
Jimmy Hoey	England	Widnes	1922	1935	12	308
Keith Holman	Australia	Western Suburbs (Sydney)	1948	1961	14	203
John Holmes	England	Leeds	1968	1989	23	625
Willie Horne	England	Barrow	1943	1959	15	461
Syd Hynes	England	Leeds	1965	1975	11	366
Fred Jones	Australia	Manly-Warringah Sea Eagles	1961	1975	14	241
John Joyner	England	Castleford	1972	1992	21	613
John Kear	England	Castleford	1978	1988	11	133
Bill Keato	Australia	Western Suburbs (Sydney)	1938	1950	11	119
Johnny King	Australia	St George Dragons	1960	1971	12	191
John Kolc	Australia	Parramatta Eels	1972	1981	10	112
Max Krilich	Australia	Manly-Warringah Sea Eagles	1970	1983	14	215
Jack Lindwall	Australia	St George Dragons	1938	1949	11	133
Jack McLean	New Zealand	Bradford Northern	1950	1956	7	221
Jack Miller	England	Warrington	1926	1946	20	526
Steve Mortimer	Australia	Canterbury-Bankstown Bulldogs	1976	1988	13	272
Bill Mullins	Australia	Eastern Suburbs Roosters	1968	1978	10	166
Joe Pearce	Australia	Eastern Suburbs	1929	1942	14	147
Sandy Pearce	Australia	Eastern Suburbs	1908	1921	14	156
Wayne Pearce	Australia	Balmain	1980	1990	11	193
George Piggins	Australia	South Sydney	1967	1978	12	118
John Plath	Australia	Brisbane Broncos	1990	1999	10	149
Harold Poynton	England	Wakefield Trinity	1957	1970	13	319
Terry Price	Wales	Bradford Northern	1967	1971	5	123
Norm Provan	Australia	St George Dragons	1951	1965	15	256
Alan Redfearn	England	Bradford Northern	1977	1983	7	244
David Redfearn	England	Bradford Northern	1971	1982	12	470
Dai Rees	Wales	Halifax	1921	1932	12	279
Austin Rhodes	England	St Helens R.F.C.	1953	1969	15	265
Maurice Richards	Wales	Salford	1969	1983	15	498
Norm Robinson	Australia	Balmain	1924	1933	10	71
Edward Rogers	England	Hull	1906	1924	15	503
Bob Ryan	England	Warrington	1945	1958	13	372
Peter Ryan	Australia	Brisbane Broncos	1989	1999	11	155
Bill Schultz	Australia	Balmain	1913	1924	12	120
Ken Senior	England	Huddersfield	1962	1979	17	476
Steve Sharp	Australia	Parramatta Eels	1979	1990	12	164
Tim Sheens	Australia	Penrith Panthers	1970	1982	13	166
Royce Simmons	Australia	Penrith Panthers	1980	1991	12	233
Arthur Skelhorne	England	Warrington	1911	1925	14	259
Cyril Stacey	England	Halifax	1915	1929	14	199
Charles Staines	England	Castleford	1937	1951	15	170
Ray Stehr	Australia	Eastern Suburbs (Sydney)	1929	1946	15	184
George Thomas	Wales	Warrington	1903	1914	11	385
Dennis Trotter	England	Bradford Northern	1970	1982	13	267
Va'aiga Tuigamala	Samoa	Wigan	1993	1997	5	102
Harold Wagstaff	England	Huddersfield	1906	1925	19	436
John Walsh	England	St Helens	1968	1975	7	185
Basil Watts	England	York	1949	1961	12	354
Ivor Watts	Wales	Hull F.C.	1945	1960	15	413
Benny Wearing	Australia	South Sydney	1921	1933	13	173
Harry Wilkinson	England	Wakefield Trinity	1930	1949	19	605
Billy Williams	Wales	Salford	1927	1938	12	425
Evan Williams	Wales	Leeds	1925	193?	15	415
Alf Wood	England	Oldham	1908	1921	13	244
Tom van Vollenhoven	South Africa	St Helens R.F.C.	1957	1968	12	409
Craig Young	Australia	St George Dragons	1977	1988	12	234

== Former Players (SL and NRL Era) ==
Name	Nationality	Club	From	To	Seasons	Games
Malcolm Alker	England	Salford City Reds	1997	2010	14	290
Mitchell Aubusson	Australia	Sydney Roosters	2007	2020	14	306
Mike Bennett	England	St Helens	2000	2008	9	161
Scott Bolton	Australia	North Queensland Cowboys	2007	2019	13	247
Thomas Bosc	France	Catalans Dragons	2006	2017	12	243
Paul Bowman	Australia	North Queensland Cowboys	1995	2007	13	203
Rob Burrow	England	Leeds Rhinos	2001	2017	17	493
Luke Burt	Australia	Parramatta Eels	1999	2012	14	264
Glen Buttriss	Australia	Canberra Raiders	2008	2015	8	119
Nathan Cayless	New Zealand	Parramatta Eels	1997	2010	14	259
Will Chambers	Australia	Melbourne Storm	2007	2019	12	218
Matt Cooper	Australia	St George Illawarra Dragons	2000	2013	14	243
Boyd Cordner	Australia	Sydney Roosters	2011	2020	10	183
Eorl Crabtree	England	Huddersfield Giants	2000	2016	17	423
Ben Creagh	Australia	St George Illawarra Dragons	2003	2016	14	274
Francis Cummins	England	Leeds Rhinos	1993	2005	13	356
Keiron Cunningham	England	St Helens	1993	2010	17	419
Hazem El Masri	Lebanon	Canterbury-Bankstown Bulldogs	1996	2009	14	317
Andy Farrell	England	Wigan Warriors	1991	2004	14	370
Paul Gallen	Australia	Cronulla-Sutherland Sharks	2001	2019	19	348
Scott Geddes	Australia	South Sydney Rabbitohs	2002	2012	11	125
Matt Gillett	Australia	Brisbane Broncos	2010	2019	10	202
Kevin Gordon	Australia	Gold Coast Titans	2009	2015	7	118
Simon Haughton	England	Wigan Warriors	1993	2002	10	174
Nathan Hindmarsh	Australia	Parramatta Eels	1998	2012	15	330
Ben Hornby	Australia	St George Illawarra Dragons	2000	2012	13	273
Richard Horne	England	Hull FC	1998	2014	17	387
Dan Hunt	Australia	St George Illawarra Dragons	2007	2015	9	151
Jamie Jones-Buchanan	England	Leeds Rhinos	1999	2019	21	411
Chris Lawrence	Australia	Wests Tigers	2006	2020	15	253
Darren Lockyer	Australia	Brisbane Broncos	1995	2011	17	355
Ben Lowe	Australia	South Sydney Rabbitohs	2008	2015	8	118
Tim Mannah	Australia	Parramatta Eels	2009	2019	11	233
Simon Mannering	New Zealand	New Zealand Warriors	2005	2018	14	301
Steve Matai	New Zealand	Manly Warringah Sea Eagles	2005	2016	12	229
Brian McDermott	England	Bradford Bulls	1994	2002	9	251
Sam McKendry	Australia	Penrith Panthers	2008	2018	11	147
James McManus	Scotland	Newcastle Knights	2007	2015	8	166
Anthony Minichiello	Australia	Sydney Roosters	2000	2014	15	302
Grégory Mounis	France	Catalans Dragons	2006	2016	11	274
Jarrod Mullen	Australia	Newcastle Knights	2005	2016	12	211
Jason Nightingale	New Zealand	St George Illawarra Dragons	2007	2018	12	266
Robbie O'Davis	Australia	Newcastle Knights	1992	2004	13	223
Corey Parker	Australia	Brisbane Broncos	2001	2016	16	347
Aaron Payne	Australia	North Queensland Cowboys	2002	2012	11	219
Kris Radlinski	England	Wigan Warriors	1993	2006	14	322
Jack Reed	England	Brisbane Broncos	2011	2016	6	128
Luke Ricketson	Australia	Sydney Roosters	1991	2005	15	301
Jerome Ropati	New Zealand	New Zealand Warriors	2003	2014	11	145
Matthew Scott	Australia	North Queensland Cowboys	2004	2019	16	268
Kevin Sinfield	England	Leeds Rhinos	1996	2015	20	521
Cameron Smith	Australia	Melbourne Storm	2002	2020	19	430
Brett Stewart	Australia	Manly Warringah Sea Eagles	2003	2016	15	231
John Sutton	Australia	South Sydney Rabbitohs	2004	2019	16	336
Sam Thaiday	Australia	Brisbane Broncos	2003	2018	16	308
Ray Thompson	Australia	North Queensland Cowboys	2009	2017	9	111
Brad Thorn	Australia	Brisbane Broncos	1994	2007	10	200
Alan Tongue	Australia	Canberra Raiders	2000	2011	12	220
Neil Turley	England	Leigh Centurions	2000	2006	7	122
Dave Tyrrell	Australia	South Sydney Rabbitohs	2009	2017	9	158
Shane Webcke	Australia	Brisbane Broncos	1995	2006	12	254
Paul Wellens	England	St Helens	1998	2015	18	499
David Williams	Australia	Manly Warringah Sea Eagles	2008	2015	8	105
Kirk Yeaman	England	Hull FC	2001	2016	16	374

== Active players ==
- As of: 02 April 2022
- Last NRL Game: ROUND 10 - Sydney Roosters vs. Canberra Raiders (16/7/20)
- Last SL Game: Huddersfield Giants vs. Leeds Rhinos (2/8/20)
- Last Championship Game: ROUND 11 - Dewsbury Rams vs. Halifax R.L.F.C. (22/4/18)
- Last League 1 Game: ROUND 8 - Workington Town vs. North Wales Crusaders (22/4/18)
- Last Challenge Cup Game: ROUND 5 - Doncaster R.L.F.C. vs. Featherstone Rovers (22/4/18)

Name	Nationality	Club	From	To	Seasons	Games
Nelson Asofa-Solomona	New Zealand	Melbourne Storm	2015	present	6	112
Jesse Bromwich	New Zealand	Melbourne Storm	2010	present	11	241
Kenny Bromwich	New Zealand	Melbourne Storm	2013	present	8	160
Jarrod Croker	Australia	Canberra Raiders	2009	present	12	267
Leroy Cudjoe	England	Huddersfield Giants	2008	present	13	276
Anthony Don	Australia	Gold Coast Titans	2013	present	8	135
David Fusitu'a	New Zealand	New Zealand Warriors	2014	present	7	101
Regan Grace	Wales	St Helens R.F.C.	2016	present	5	94
Oliver Holmes	England	Castleford Tigers	2010	present	11	200
Danny Houghton	England	Hull F.C.	2007	present	14	352
Josh Jackson	Australia	Canterbury-Bankstown Bulldogs	2012	present	9	190
Alex Johnston	Australia	South Sydney Rabbitohs	2014	present	7	132
Phil Joy	England	Oldham R.L.F.C.	2012	present	7	113
Morgan Knowles	Wales	St Helens R.F.C.	2015	present	6	117
Michael Lawrence	England	Huddersfield Giants	2008	present	13	283
Jonny Lomax	England	St Helens R.F.C.	2009	present	12	224
Sione Mata'utia	Australia	Newcastle Knights	2014	present	7	118
Adam Milner	England	Castleford Tigers	2010	present	11	244
Michael Morgan	Australia	North Queensland Cowboys	2010	present	11	163
Cameron Munster	Australia	Melbourne Storm	2014	present	7	121
Sean O'Loughlin	England	Wigan Warriors	2002	present	19	452
Corey Oates	Australia	Brisbane Broncos	2013	present	8	153
Josh Papalii	New Zealand	Canberra Raiders	2011	present	10	207
Sébastien Planas	France	Toulouse Olympique	2007	present	12	178
James Roby	England	St Helens R.F.C.	2004	present	17	500
Daniel Saifiti	Fiji	Newcastle Knights	2016	present	5	94
Jorge Taufua	Australia	Manly Warringah Sea Eagles	2012	present	9	156
Jason Taumalolo	New Zealand	North Queensland Cowboys	2010	present	11	189
Peni Terepo	Tonga	Parramatta Eels	2013	present	8	123
Jake Trbojevic	Australia	Manly Warringah Sea Eagles	2013	present	8	128
Tom Trbojevic	Australia	Manly Warringah Sea Eagles	2015	present	6	95
Daniel Tupou	Australia	Sydney Roosters	2012	present	9	172
Suliasi Vunivalu	Fiji	Melbourne Storm	2016	present	5	103
Cody Walker	Australia	South Sydney Rabbitohs	2016	present	5	103
Stevie Ward	England	Leeds Rhinos	2012	present	9	134
Fouad Yaha	France	Catalans Dragons	2015	present	6	91
Isaah Yeo	Australia	Penrith Panthers	2014	present	7	135
Nathan Cleary	Australia	Penrith Panthers	2016	present	11	205

== See also ==
- List of one-club men in association football
- List of Major League Baseball players who spent their entire career with one franchise
- List of National Football League players who spent their entire career with one franchise
- List of NBA players who have spent their entire career with one franchise
- List of NHL players who spent their entire career with one franchise
