= 1924 Great Britain Lions tour =

- Manager: J. H. Dannatt and E. Osborne
- Tour captain(s): Jonty Parkin
- Top point scorer(s): Jim Sullivan (168)
- Top try scorer(s): Johnny Ring (23)
Summary
P	W	D	L
Total
27	21	0	6
Test match
6	3	0	3
Opponent
P	W	D	L
Australia
3	2	0	1
New Zealand
3	1	0	2

Tour chronology
- Previous tour: 1920
- Next tour: 1928

The 1924 Great Britain Lions tour was a tour by the Great Britain national rugby league team of Australia and New Zealand which took place between May and August 1924. The tour involved a schedule of 27 games; 18 in Australia, including a three-test series against Australia for the Ashes and a further nine in New Zealand, including a three-test series against New Zealand.

Captained by Jonty Parkin, the Lions returned home having won 21, and lost six games. They won the Ashes against Australia by two tests to one, but lost two out of three tests against New Zealand.

Despite being classed as Great Britain with the presence of Welsh players, the team actually played the tour listed as England.

== Squad ==
An initial 20-man squad for the tour was named on 27 February 1924, with six additional players being selected in the following weeks. Wakefield Trinity scrum-half Jonty Parkin was appointed as captain.

Name	Position	Nationality	Club
Ernie Knapman	Fullback	England	Oldham
Jim Sullivan	Fullback	Wales	Wigan
Billy Bentham	Wing	England	Broughton Rangers
Frank Evans	Wing	Wales	Swinton
Johnny Ring	Wing	Wales	Wigan
Sid Rix	Wing	England	Oldham
Jim Bacon	Centre	Wales	Leeds
Charlie Carr	Centre	England	Barrow
Tommy Howley	Centre	Wales	Wigan
Charlie Pollard	Centre	England	Wakefield Trinity
Danny Hurcombe	Stand-off	Wales	Wigan
Stan Whitty	Stand-off	England	Hull
Walter Mooney	Scrum-half	England	Leigh
Jonty Parkin (c)	Scrum-half	England	Wakefield Trinity
Harold Bowman	Prop forward	England	Hull
Bill Burgess	Prop forward	England	Barrow
Billy Cunliffe	Prop forward	England	Warrington
Joe Thompson	Prop forward	Wales	Leeds
Jack Bennett	Hooker	England	Rochdale Hornets
Ben Gronow	Hooker	Wales	Huddersfield
Albert Brough	Second-row	England	Oldham
Joe Darwell	Second-row	England	Leigh
Dai Rees	Second-row	Wales	Halifax
Bob Sloman	Second-row	England	Oldham
Frank Gallagher	Loose forward	England	Batley
Jack Price	Loose forward	England	Wigan

The two team managers were J. H. Dannatt of Hull and E. Osborne of Warrington.

== Schedule and results ==
The majority of the touring party departed from Tilbury on 11 April 1924. Due to their involvement in the 1924 Challenge Cup final, the nine players selected from Wigan and Oldham travelled overland and joined the ship at Marseille. The team arrived in Melbourne on 20 May.

Date	Opponents	Score (GB first)	Venue	Attendance	Notes
24 May	Victoria	45–13	Brunswick Street Oval, Melbourne	15,000	
26 May	Southern Districts	31–4	Fisher Park, Cootamundra	5,500	
31 May	Newcastle	43–18	Newcastle Sports Ground, Newcastle	9,000	
4 June	New England	34–17	Tamworth Oval, Tamworth	3,500	
7 June	NSW Firsts	10–5	Sydney Cricket Ground, Sydney	42,000	
9 June	NSW Firsts	18–33	Sydney Cricket Ground, Sydney	48,000	
12 June	Ipswich	17–0	North Ipswich Reserve, Ipswich	2,000	
14 June	Queensland Firsts	10–25	Brisbane Exhibition Ground, Brisbane	35,000	
19 June	Toowoomba	20–23	Athletic Oval, Toowoomba	10,000	
21 June	NSW Firsts	43–5	Sydney Cricket Ground, Sydney	26,042	
23 June	Australia	22–3	Sydney Cricket Ground, Sydney	50,005	
25 June	Orange	42–23	Wade Park, Orange	5,000	
28 June	Australia	5–3	Sydney Cricket Ground, Sydney	33,842	
2 July	North Coast	28–19	Oakes Oval, Lismore	8,000	
5 July	Central Queensland	34–20	George Street Ground, Rockhampton	8,000	
8 July	Maryborough	22–3	Maryborough Showgound, Maryborough	2,500	
12 July	Australia	11–21	Brisbane Exhibition Ground, Brisbane	39,000	
16 July	Universities XIII	31–23	Sydney Sports Ground, Sydney	2,000	
23 July	South Auckland	28–16	Steele Park, Hamilton	3,000	
26 July	Auckland	24–11	Carlaw Park, Auckland	20,000	
28 July	Waikato	30–12	Paterson Park, Ngāruawāhia		
30 July	Provincial XIII	28–13	Carlaw Park, Auckland	7,000	
2 August	New Zealand	8–16	Carlaw Park, Auckland	22,000	
6 August	New Zealand	11–13	Basin Reserve, Wellington	6,000	
9 August	New Zealand	31–18	Tahuna Park, Dunedin	14,000	
15 August	West Coast	65–8	Victoria Park, Greymouth	3,000	
16 August	Canterbury	47–10	Addington Showgound, Christchurch	9,000	

The team departed New Zealand aboard the RMS Tahiti, returning home via America.
