= Walter Mooney (rugby league) =

Former GB international rugby league footballer

Personal information
- Full name: Walter Mooney
- Born: c. 1892 Leigh district, England
- Died: 1958 (aged 65–66) Leigh district, England

Playing information
- Position: Stand-off
Club
Years	Team	Pld	T	G	FG	P
1912–26	Leigh	206	32	4		104
Representative
Years	Team	Pld	T	G	FG	P
1924	Great Britain	2	0	0	0	0

Walter Mooney (c. 1892 – c. 1958) was an English professional rugby league footballer who played as a stand-off in the 1910s and 1920s. He played at international level for Great Britain and at club level for Leigh.

== Playing career ==
=== International honours ===
Walter Mooney won caps for Great Britain while at Leigh in 1924 against New Zealand (2 matches).

=== Challenge Cup Final appearances ===
Walter Mooney played scrum-half and was captain in Leigh's 13-0 victory over Halifax in the 1920–21 Challenge Cup Final during the 1920–21 season at The Cliff, Broughton on Saturday 30 April 1921, in front of a crowd of 25,000.

=== County Cup Final appearances ===
Walter Mooney played, and scored a goal, in Leigh's 2-20 defeat by Wigan in the 1922 Lancashire Cup Final during the 1922–23 season at The Willows, Salford on Saturday 25 November 1922.
