= Tom Clarkson (rugby league) =

Former England international rugby league footballer

- Ogden's Cigarette card featuring Thomas Clarkson

Personal information
- Full name: Thomas Clarkson
- Born: 1897 Leigh, Greater Manchester, England
- Died: unknown

Playing information
- Position: Fullback
Club
Years	Team	Pld	T	G	FG	P
1919–33	Leigh	369	17	315		681
Representative
Years	Team	Pld	T	G	FG	P
1921–22	Lancashire	3	0	2	0	4
1921–23	England	3	0	1	0	2

Thomas "Tom"/"Tommy" Clarkson (birth unknown – death unknown) was an English professional rugby league footballer who played in the 1910s, 1920s and 1930s. He played at representative level for England, and at club level for Leigh, as a goal-kicking fullback.

== Playing career ==
=== Challenge Cup Final appearances ===
Tom Clarkson played fullback, and scored 2-goals in Leigh's 13-0 victory over Halifax in the 1920–21 Challenge Cup Final during the 1920–21 season at The Cliff, Broughton on Saturday 30 April 1921, in front of a crowd of 25,000.

=== International honours ===
Tom Clarkson won caps for England while at Leigh in 1921 against Australia, in 1922 against Wales, and in 1923 against Wales.

== Genealogical information ==
Tom Clarkson was the younger brother of the rugby league footballer; Ellis Clarkson.
