= Albert Akroyd =

England international rugby league footballer

Personal information
- Full name: Albert William Akroyd
- Born: 27 January 1890 Halifax, Yorkshire, England
- Died: 8 August 1959 (aged 69) Halifax, Yorkshire, England

Playing information
- Position: Centre
Club
Years	Team	Pld	T	G	FG	P
1911–22	Halifax	137	38	4	0	122
Representative
Years	Team	Pld	T	G	FG	P
1920–21	Yorkshire	2	0	0	0	0
1921	England	1	0	0	0	0

Albert William Akroyd (Note: Sometimes spelled "Ackroyd" in contemporary sources.) (27 January 1890 – 8 August 1959) was an English professional rugby league footballer who played in the 1920s. He played at representative level for England, and at club level for Halifax, as a centre. Akroyd served in the Royal Navy during the First World War, from 1916–19.

== Playing career ==
=== Club career ===
Ackroyd played at centre in Halifax's 0-13 defeat by Leigh in the 1920–21 Challenge Cup Final during the 1920–21 season at The Cliff, Broughton on Saturday 30 April 1921, in front of a crowd of 25,000.

=== International honours ===
Ackroyd won a cap for England while at Halifax in 1921 against Wales.

== Post-retirement ==
Ackroyd retired in 1922. He served as assistant trainer for Halifax from 1931 to 1933.

He died in 1959 at St. John's Hospital in Halifax.
