= Bobby Lloyd =

GB & Wales international dual-code rugby footballer

Personal information
- Full name: Robert Lloyd
- Born: c. 1888 Crickhowell, Wales
- Died: 18 January 1930 (aged 41–42) Halifax, West Yorkshire, England

Playing information

Rugby union
- Position: Scrum-half
Club
Years	Team	Pld	T	G	FG	P
	Pontypool
Representative
Years	Team	Pld	T	G	FG	P
	Monmouthshire County
1913–14	Wales	7	0	0	0	0

Rugby league
- Position: Scrum-half, Forward
Club
Years	Team	Pld	T	G	FG	P
1914–24	Halifax	161	13	2	0	43
Representative
Years	Team	Pld	T	G	FG	P
1920	Great Britain	1	0	0	0	0
1921	Wales	1	0	0	0	0

Robert Lloyd (c. 1888 – 18 January 1930), nicknamed "The Hafodyrynys Wonder", was a Welsh international rugby union and rugby league footballer. He played union for Welsh clubs Pontypool and Monmouthshire County as a scrum half back, gaining selection for Wales, before moving to England to play league for Halifax, also in the halves, and gaining selection for Great Britain and Wales. He died on 18 January 1930, aged 41 or 42, in Halifax.

== Rugby union ==
Lloyd worked as a miner, and in 1912 was part of the Monmouthshire County team that faced the touring South Africans. Lloyd played well and gave the Springbok halves, Freddie Luyt and Uncle Dobbin a difficult match, though the tourists class shone through to win the game comfortably. A scrum-half, Lloyd was first capped for Wales in a winning game against Scotland on 1 February 1913. The game was played at Inverleith and both sides had a sparsity of international experience; though Wales were captained by the veteran Billy Trew. Lloyd played in the next six consecutive games in the 1913 and 1914 Five Nations Championships, which saw Wales finish second to England in both tournaments. Lloyd was a favourite at Pontypool and was one of the finest scrum-halves produced by the club.

International matches for Wales

- England 1914
- France 1913, 1914
- Ireland 1913, 1914
- Scotland 1913, 1914

== Rugby league ==
Lloyd went north and in 1914 commenced playing for English Northern Rugby Football Union club; Halifax. He was selected to go on the 1920 Great Britain Lions tour of Australia and New Zealand. Lloyd won a cap for Great Britain while at Halifax in 1920 against Australia. Lloyd won a cap for Wales while at Halifax in 1921.

Lloyd played stand-off in Halifax's 0-13 defeat by Leigh in the 1920–21 Challenge Cup Final during the 1920–21 season at The Cliff, on 30 April 1921, in front of a crowd of 25,000.

== Bibliography ==
- Billot, John (1974). Springboks in Wales. Ferndale, Glamorgan: Ron Jones Publications.
- Smith, David; Williams, Gareth (1980). Fields of Praise: The Official History of The Welsh Rugby Union. Cardiff: University of Wales Press. ISBN 0-7083-0766-3.
