= Cyril Stacey =

GB international rugby league footballer

Personal information
- Full name: John Cyril Stacey
- Born: 7 November 1895; Halifax, England
- Died: 17 September 1964 (aged 68)

Playing information
- Position: Fullback
Club
Years	Team	Pld	T	G	FG	P
1915–24	Halifax	166	76	17	0	262
1924–28	Batley	118	44	2	0	136
1928–29	Halifax	33	11	0	0	33
	Total	317	131	19	0	431
Representative
Years	Team	Pld	T	G	FG	P
1920–24	Yorkshire	5	5	0	0	15
1920	Great Britain	1	0	0	0	0

John Cyril Stacey (7 November 1895 – 17 September 1964) was an English professional rugby league footballer who played in the 1910s and 1920s. He played at representative level for Great Britain and Yorkshire, and at club level for Halifax and Batley as a fullback. He is a Halifax Hall Of Fame Inductee.

== Playing career ==
=== Club career ===
Stacey played left-centre in Halifax's 0–13 defeat by Leigh in the 1920–21 Challenge Cup Final during the 1920–21 season at The Cliff, Broughton on Saturday 30 April 1921, in front of a crowd of 25,000.

Stacey debuted for Batley in August 1924, and played right-wing in Batley's 8–9 defeat by Wakefield Trinity in the 1924–25 Yorkshire Cup Final during the 1924–25 season at Headingley, Leeds on Saturday 22 November 1924, in front of a crowd of 25,546.

Stacey returned to Halifax in January 1928, and played his last game for the club on Saturday 9 February 1929.

=== Representative honours ===
Stacey was selected to go on the 1920 Great Britain Lions tour of Australasia, he won a cap for Great Britain while at Halifax in 1920 against New Zealand.

Stacey won caps for Yorkshire while at Halifax.
