= Joe Darwell =

GB & England international rugby league footballer

- Godfrey Phillips Cigarette card featuring Joseph Darwell

Personal information
- Full name: Joseph Darwell
- Born: 17 July 1891; Leigh, England
- Died: 9 September 1953 (aged 62); Leigh, England

Playing information
- Position: Second-row
Club
Years	Team	Pld	T	G	FG	P
1912–29	Leigh	297	30	11		112
Representative
Years	Team	Pld	T	G	FG	P
1922–24	Lancashire	4	1	0	0	3
1922–23	England	3	0	0	0	0
1924	Great Britain	5	0	0	0	0

Joseph Darwell (17 July 1891 – 9 September 1953) was an English professional rugby league footballer who played in the 1910s and 1920s. He played at representative level for Great Britain and England, and at club level for Leigh, as a second-row.

== Background ==
Joe Darwell was born in Leigh, Lancashire, England, and he died aged c. 62–63 in Leigh, Lancashire, England.

== Playing career ==
=== Club career ===
Joe Darwell made 297 appearances for Leigh, scoring 30 tries and 11 goals.

=== International honours ===
Joe Darwell won caps for England while at Leigh in 1922 against Wales, and in 1923 against Wales (2 matches), and won caps for Great Britain while at Leigh in 1924 against Australia (3 matches), and New Zealand (2 matches).

=== Challenge Cup Final appearances ===
Joe Darwell played at second-row in Leigh's 13–0 victory over Halifax in the 1920–21 Challenge Cup Final during the 1920–21 season at The Cliff, Broughton on Saturday 30 April 1921, in front of a crowd of 25,000.
