= Harry Rafter =

English rugby league footballer

Personal information
- Full name: Harry Rafter
- Born: Wakefield, England
- Height: 5 ft 8 in (173 cm)
- Weight: 12 st 4 lb (78 kg)

Playing information
- Position: Prop, Second-row
Club
| Years | Team | Pld | T | G | FG | P |
|---|---|---|---|---|---|---|
| Nov 1913–Apr 23 | Wakefield Trinity | 116 | 5 | 0 | 0 | 15 |

Harry Rafter from Wakefield, was an English professional rugby league footballer who played in the 1910s and 1920s. He played at club level for Wakefield Trinity, as a prop, or second-row.

== Notable tour matches ==
Harry Rafter played at prop in Wakefield Trinity's 3-29 defeat by Australia in the 1921–22 Kangaroo tour of Great Britain match at Belle Vue, Wakefield on Saturday 22 October 1921.
