= Joe Cartwright (rugby league) =

Former GB & England international rugby league footballer

- Godfrey Phillips Cigarette card featuring Joe Cartwright

Personal information
- Full name: Joseph Cartwright
- Born: 29 December 1890 Leigh, Lancashire, England
- Died: 17 December 1949 (aged 58) Leigh, Lancashire, England

Playing information
- Position: Hooker; Halfback
Club
Years	Team	Pld	T	G	FG	P
1911–26	Leigh	348	7	0	0	21
Representative
Years	Team	Pld	T	G	FG	P
≥1911–≤26	Lancashire
1921–23	England	6	0	0	0	0
1920–22	Great Britain	7	0	0	0	0

Joseph Cartwright (29 December 1890 – 17 December 1949) was an English professional rugby league footballer who played in the 1910s and 1920s. He played at representative level for Great Britain, England and Lancashire, and at club level for Leigh, as a hooker.

== Family and early life ==
Cartwright was born in Leigh, Greater Manchester in December 1890, the ninth child of coal miner Allen Cartwright and Ellen Houghton Cartwright. By 1911, he was also working as a colliery foreman assistant while playing rugby. He married Mary Alice Newton in 1921 in Leigh. They had four children: Sydney (born 9 January 1921), Marion (born 5 October 1922), Alice (born 28 May 1924) and Harold (born 1 May 1926).

== Playing career ==
=== Club career ===
Cartwright made 348 appearances for Leigh between 1911 and 1927, scoring seven tries.

=== International honours ===
Cartwright won caps for England while at Leigh in 1921 against Wales, Other Nationalities, and Australia, in 1922 against Wales, and in 1923 against Wales (2 matches), he was selected to go on the 1920 Great Britain Lions tour of Australasia, and he won caps for Great Britain while at Leigh in 1920 against Australia, and New Zealand (3 matches), and in 1921-22 against Australia (3 matches).

=== County honours ===
Cartwright won caps for Lancashire while at Leigh.

=== Challenge Cup Final appearances ===
Cartwright played hooker in Leigh's 13-0 victory over Halifax in the 1920–21 Challenge Cup Final during the 1920–21 season at The Cliff, Broughton on Saturday 30 April 1921, in front of a crowd of 25,000.

== Retirement and death ==
Cartwright retired from playing football in 1926, and he started work at the Parsonage Colliery, Leigh building underground roads. After his death in December 1949, an inquiry was held to determine if it was caused by work conditions, at which point his health was investigated. Cartwright had not been employed at the colliery very long when he was struck in the back by a sharp piece of stone, and he was out of work 15 weeks. In 1937, Cartwright was treated by Dr. Hayward for eye trouble. Around 1947 he had an accident in the mine when he was struck in the right eye by a piece of stone, which opened up an old footballing wound. In 1939, he was still employed at the colliery working as a hewer.

In July 1949, Cartwright was forced to retire from the colliery because of a persistent cough. Nurse Ellen Wilcock of Leigh Infirmary said that on 16 December 1949 his condition worsened and he died the next day. Dr. S. H. Jackson of the University of Manchester, the pathologist who conducted Cartwright's autopsy, said that in his opinion Cartwright's death was due to toxic absorption caused chronic obstructive pulmonary disease (emphysema) of the right lung. When questioned by C. L. Tyrer, the President of the Lancashire and Cheshire Miners' Federation, Dr. S. H. Jackson said he had found slight traces of pneumoconiosis in Cartwright, but that this had not accelerated his death. At Leigh Police Station, the district coroner, R. M. Barlow, said that he had heard the impartial evidence of the pathologist, and in his opinion he was quite satisfied that the pneumoconiosis had not caused death in any way, and so returned a verdict of death from natural causes.
