= Arthur Cockcroft =

English rugby league footballer (1892–1916)

Arthur C. Cockcroft
Personal information
- Full name: Arthur Clarence Cockcroft
- Born: 1892; Sculcoates, Hull, Yorkshire, England
- Died: 1 July 1916 (aged 24); Somme, France

Playing information
- Position: Wing, Centre
Club
Years	Team	Pld	T	G	FG	P
1913–14	Wakefield Trinity	8	6	0	0	18

2nd Lt. Arthur Clarence Cockeroft (1892 – 1 July 1916) was an English professional rugby league footballer who played in the 1910s. He played at club level for Knottingley Welfare ARLFC (in Knottingley, Wakefield) and Wakefield Trinity, playing as a wing or centre. He signed for Wakefield Trinity on the same day as Jonty Parkin.

Cockcroft was employed as a schoolteacher prior to World War I. He was killed on the first day of the Battle of the Somme, while serving with the King's Own Yorkshire Light Infantry.
