= Skelhorn =

Skelhorn is a surname. Notable people with the surname include:

- Arthur Skelhorn (c. 1888–1931), English rugby league player
- Norman Skelhorn (1909–1988), English barrister
