= Norm Potter =

Australian rugby league footballer

Personal information
- Full name: Norman Potter
- Died: 9 December 1951; Brisbane

Playing information
Club
Years	Team	Pld	T	G	FG	P
	Wests (Brisbane)
	St Pauls (Ipswich)
	Maryborough
	Total	0	0	0	0	0
Representative
Years	Team	Pld	T	G	FG	P
1918–27	Queensland	44
1919–24	Australia	7

Norm Potter (1893–1951) was an Australian professional rugby league footballer in the 1910s and '20s. A Queensland state and Australia national representative front-row forward, he was one of Queensland's early stalwart star players, making forty-four state appearances in an unbroken representative career between 1918 and 1927.

== Career ==
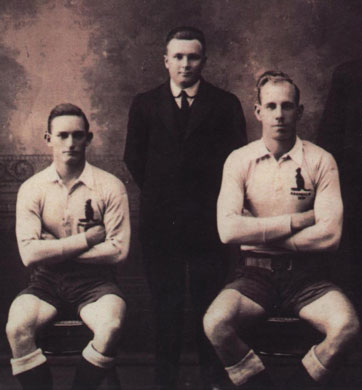
Potter right, 1920 with fellow Queenslanders Harry Fewin and Harry Sunderland

Potter's early club career was with Wests Brisbane. In 1918 he was selected and captained the first post-World War I Queensland state side. He toured New Zealand with the Australian representative side in 1919 making a sole Test appearance. He played a match for Queensland against the 1920 Great Britain Lions tourists and went on to make six further Test appearances, playing at front-row in all three Tests of both the 1920 and the 1924 domestic Ashes series against Great Britain. He made the 1921-22 Kangaroo tour of Great Britain playing in ten tour matches but he was kept out of the Test line-ups by the front-row pairing of Clarrie Prentice and Bill Schultz. In 1922 he was captain of the first ever Queensland side to beat New South Wales in the annual interstate series. After retiring as a player he became a first-grade coach in the Brisbane competition.
