= Frank Todd (rugby league) =

England international rugby league footballer

Personal information
- Full name: Frank Todd
- Born: c. 1899 Halifax, West Riding of Yorkshire, England
- Died: 4 January 1959 (aged 60) Halifax, West Riding of Yorkshire, England

Playing information
- Position: Wing, Stand-off
Club
Years	Team	Pld	T	G	FG	P
1916–28	Halifax	333	66	2	0	202
Representative
Years	Team	Pld	T	G	FG	P
	Yorkshire	8
1921–24	England	3	2	0	0	6

Frank Todd (c. 1899 – 4 January 1959) was an English professional rugby league footballer who played in the 1910s and 1920s. He played at representative level for England and Yorkshire, and at club level for Halifax, as a wing or stand-off.

== Background ==
Frank Todd was born in Halifax, West Riding of Yorkshire, England.

== Playing career ==
=== Club career ===
Todd made his début for Halifax during 1916, and he played his last match for Halifax on Saturday 21 April 1928.

Todd played on the wing in Halifax's 0-13 defeat by Leigh in the 1920–21 Challenge Cup Final during the 1920–21 season at The Cliff, Broughton on Saturday 30 April 1921, in front of a crowd of 25,000.

=== Representative honours ===
Todd won caps for England while at Halifax in 1921 against Australia, in 1923 against Wales, and in 1924 against Other Nationalities.

Todd won caps for Yorkshire while at Halifax.

== Honoured at Halifax RLFC ==
Todd was inducted into the Halifax RLFC Hall Of Fame in 2008.
