= Frank Gallagher (rugby league) =

GB & England international rugby league footballer

- Ogden's Cigarette card featuring Frank Gallagher

Personal information
- Born: c. 1895 unknown
- Died: 20 March 1966 (aged 71); Leeds, England

Playing information
- Position: Stand-off, Scrum-half, Second-row, Loose forward
Club
| Years | Team | Pld | T | G | FG | P |
|---|---|---|---|---|---|---|
| 1912–22 | Dewsbury | 96 | 19 | 1 | | 59 |
| 1922–27 | Batley | 143 | 36 | 16 | 0 | 135 |
| 1927–29 | Leeds | 78 | 10 |
| | Total | 317 | 65 | 17 | 0 | 194 |
Representative
| Years | Team | Pld | T | G | FG | P |
| 19??–?? | Yorkshire | ? | ? |
| 1923–28 | England | 8 | 1 | 0 | 0 | 3 |
| 1920–26 | Great Britain | 12 | 3 | 0 | 0 | 9 |

Frank Gallagher (c. 1895 – 20 March 1966), was an English professional rugby league footballer who played in the 1920s. He played at representative level for Great Britain, England and Yorkshire, and at club level for Dewsbury, Batley and Leeds, as a stand-off, scrum-half, second-row, or loose forward.

== Background ==
Frank Gallagher's death aged 71 was registered in Leeds district, West Riding of Yorkshire, England.

== Playing ==
=== Club ===
Gallagher was transferred from Dewsbury to Batley in 1922 for a fee of £600. He missed Batley's 13–7 victory over Wigan in the Championship Final during the 1923–24 season at The Cliff, Broughton on Saturday 3 May 1924, while on the 1924 Great Britain Lions tour of Australia and New Zealand.

Gallagher played loose forward in Batley's 8–9 defeat by Wakefield Trinity in the 1924–25 Yorkshire Cup Final during the 1924–25 season at Headingley, Leeds on Saturday 22 November 1924, in front of a crowd of 25,546.

=== Representative ===
Gallagher was selected to go on the 1920 Great Britain Lions tour of Australasia and won caps for Great Britain while at Dewsbury in 1920 against Australia (3 matches), in 1921-22 against Australia, while at Batley in 1924 against Australia (3 matches), and New Zealand (3 matches), and in 1926-27 against New Zealand (2 matches). He also won caps for England while at Batley in 1923 against Other Nationalities, in 1924 against Other Nationalities, in 1925 against Wales (2 matches), in 1926 against Wales, and Other Nationalities, in 1927 against Wales, while at Leeds in 1928 against Wales.

Only five players have played test matches for Great Britain as both a back, and a forward, they are; Colin Dixon, Frank Gallagher, Laurie Gilfedder, Billy Jarman and Harry Street.
