= Louis Marshall (rugby league) =

England international rugby league footballer

Louis/Lewis Marshall
- Godfrey Phillips Cigarette card featuring Lewis Marshall

Personal information
- Full name: Louis/Lewis Marshall
- Born: unknown
- Died: unknown

Playing information
- Position: Centre, Loose forward
Club
Years	Team	Pld	T	G	FG	P
<1919–19	Leeds
1919–25	Bramley	168	39	7	?	131
	Total	168	39	7		131
Representative
Years	Team	Pld	T	G	FG	P
1923	England	1	0	0	0	0

Louis/Lewis Marshall (birth unknown – death unknown) was an English professional rugby league footballer who played in the 1910s and 1920s. He played at representative level for England, and at club level for Leeds and Bramley, as a centre or loose forward.

== Playing career ==
=== Club career ===
Marshall transferred from Leeds to Bramley during February 1919 in exchange for Squire Stockwell, he made his début for Bramley as a centre, and scored a try, in the 33-0 victory over York at Barley Mow, Bramley, Leeds on Saturday 15 February 1919, and he played his last match for Bramley, and scored a try, in the 3-13 defeat by Wigan Highfield at Tunstall Lane, Pemberton on Thursday 1 January 1925.

=== International honours ===
Marshall won a cap for England while at Bramley, he played loose forward in England's 2-13 defeat by Wales at Central Park, Wigan on Wednesday 7 February 1923.

== Note ==
The englandrl.co.uk website states Marshall's forename as being Louis, the Godfrey Phillips Cigarette card states Marshall's forename as being Lewis.
