= Gwyn Thomas (rugby) =

GB & Wales international rugby league footballer

Personal information
- Full name: William Gwyn Thomas
- Born: 22 Oct 1892 Treherbert, Glamorgan, Wales
- Died: 11 January 1984 (aged 91) Indian River, Florida, USA

Playing information
- Height: 5 ft 10 3/4 in (179.7 cm)
- Weight: 12 st 6 lb (79 kg; 174 lb)

Rugby union
Club
| Years | Team | Pld | T | G | FG | P |
|---|---|---|---|---|---|---|
| 1912–13 | Cardiff | 3 | 0 | 0 | 0 | 0 |
| | London Welsh |
| | Total | 3 | 0 | 0 | 0 | 0 |
Representative
| Years | Team | Pld | T | G | FG | P |
| 1915? | Barbarian F.C. | 1? |

Rugby league
- Position: Fullback, Centre
Club
| Years | Team | Pld | T | G | FG | P |
|---|---|---|---|---|---|---|
| 1913–15 | Wigan | 43 | 5 | 8 | 0 | 31 |
| 1918–19 | Wigan | 7 |
| 1918–2? | Huddersfield |
| | Total | 50 | 5 | 8 | 0 | 31 |
Representative
| Years | Team | Pld | T | G | FG | P |
| 1914–21 | Wales | 2 | 0 | 0 | 0 | 0 |
| 1914–22 | Great Britain | 9 | 0 | 0 | 0 | 0 |
| 1921 | Other Nationalities | 1 | 0 | 0 | 0 | 0 |

William Gwyn Thomas (22 October 1892 – 11 January 1984) was a Welsh rugby union, and professional rugby league footballer who played in the 1910s and 1920s who played rugby union (RU) for Cardiff and London Welsh, and representative level rugby league (RL) for Great Britain, Wales and Other Nationalities, and at club level for Wigan and Huddersfield, as a fullback or centre.

Whilst playing for Wigan Thomas was selected to go on the 1914 Great Britain Lions tour of Australia and New Zealand, playing as a fullback in the second Test match of the Ashes series against Australia.

It was claimed that Thomas played rugby union for Barbarian F.C. against South Africa in November 1915. However the Barbarians website say that it wasn't him, that instead it was another Gwyn Thomas who also played rugby union for Neath RFC.

Whilst playing for Huddersfield Thomas was selected to go on the 1920 Great Britain Lions tour of Australasia. He was vice-captain, and played at fullback in all three Test matches of the Ashes series. He also played in two Test matches against New Zealand.

During the 1921–22 Kangaroo tour Thomas was selected to play for Great Britain at fullback against Australia in all three test matches of the Ashes, which was won by the British.
