= Danny Hurcombe =

GB & Wales international rugby league footballer

- Godfrey Phillips cigarette card featuring Hurcombe

Personal information
- Full name: Daniel Hurcombe
- Born: 14 November 1896; Wales
- Died: 19 March 1965 (aged 70); Wigan, England

Playing information

Rugby union
Club
| Years | Team | Pld | T | G | FG | P |
|---|---|---|---|---|---|---|
| | Talywain |

Rugby league
- Position: Wing, Centre, Stand-off, Scrum-half
Club
| Years | Team | Pld | T | G | FG | P |
|---|---|---|---|---|---|---|
| 1919–26 | Wigan | 199 | 72 | 3 | 0 | 222 |
| 1926–27 | Halifax | 22 | 6 | 0 | 0 | 18 |
| 1927–30 | Leigh | 29 | 3 | 3 | 0 | 15 |
| 1931–32 | Keighley | 31 | 2 | 11 | 0 | 28 |
| | Total | 281 | 83 | 17 | 0 | 283 |
Representative
| Years | Team | Pld | T | G | FG | P |
| 1921–26 | Wales | 7 | 5 | 0 | 0 | 15 |
| 1920–24 | Great Britain | 8 | 1 | 0 | 0 | 3 |
| 1924–26 | Other Nationalities | 2 | 0 | 0 | 0 | 0 |
| 1920–24 | GB tour games | 17 | 9 | 1 | 0 | 29 |

Daniel "Danny" Hurcombe (14 November 1896 – 19 March 1965) was a Welsh rugby union, and professional rugby league footballer who played in the 1910s and 1920s. He played club level rugby union (RU) for Talywain RFC, and representative level rugby league (RL) for Great Britain and Wales, and at club level for Wigan and Leigh, as a wing, centre, stand-off, or scrum-half.

== Playing career ==
Hurcombe initially played club level rugby union for Talywain RFC. From 29 November 1919 Hurcombe played for English rugby league club, Wigan. Hurcombe was selected to go on the 1920 Great Britain Lions tour of Australia and New Zealand. He won caps for Great Britain (RL) while at Wigan in 1920 against Australia (2 matches), and New Zealand, in 1922 against Australia, and in 1924 against Australia (2 matches), and New Zealand (2 matches), and he won 6 caps for Wales in 1921–1926 while at Wigan.

Hurcombe made his début for Wigan in the 0–11 defeat by Widnes at Lowerhouse Lane, Widnes on Saturday 29 November 1919, and he scored his first try for Wigan in the 18–8 victory over Leigh at Central Park, Wigan on Thursday 25 December 1919. Hurcombe played in Wigan's victories in the Lancashire League during the 1920–21 season, 1922–23 season, 1923–24 season and 1925–26 season. Hurcombe played scrum-half, in Wigan's 20–2 victory over Leigh in the 1922 Lancashire Cup Final during the 1922–23 season at The Willows, Salford on Saturday 25 November 1922. and played scrum-half in Wigan's 11–15 defeat by Swinton in the 1925 Lancashire Cup Final during the 1925–26 season at The Cliff, Broughton on Wednesday 9 December 1925. Hurcombe played in Wigan's victories as league leaders during the 1923–24 season and 1925–26 season, but he did not play in the Championship finals during the 1921–22 season and 1925–26 season, it is not known whether he played in the Championship Final during the 1923–24 season. Hurcombe played scrum-half, in Wigan's 21–4 victory over Oldham in the 1924 Challenge Cup Final during the 1923–24 season at Athletic Grounds, Rochdale on Saturday 12 April 1924. Hurcombe scored his last try for Wigan in the 10–5 victory over St Helens Recs at City Road, Windle, St Helens on Saturday 2 January 1926, and he played his last Match for Wigan in the 4–0 victory over Wakefield Trinity at Central Park, Wigan on Saturday 23 January 1926.
