= Neville Broadfoot =

Australian rugby league footballer (1897–1943)

Personal information
- Full name: William Neville Broadfoot
- Born: 11 November 1897
- Died: 4 October 1943 (aged 45)

Playing information
- Position: Wing, Centre
Representative
Years	Team	Pld	T	G	FG	P
1918–22	Queensland	15	6	1	0	20
1920	Australia	1	0	0	0	0

William Neville Broadfoot (11 November 1897 – 4 October 1943) was an Australian rugby league footballer.

Based in Toowoomba, Broadfoot came from a well known rugby playing family. Both his uncle Bob and younger brother Frank were Queensland state representatives in rugby union. He also had another brother, Cecil, who played rugby league for Queensland and became an international referee.

Broadfoot was utilised as a winger in his representative appearances for Queensland, but gained his solitary international cap as a centre, when he appeared in the opening Test match against the 1920 Great Britain Lions at the Brisbane Exhibition Ground. He was also a member of the Kangaroos squad for their 1921–22 tour of Great Britain, where he was restricted to the fixtures against non–international opposition. Most notably, Broadfoot contributed two tries from the wing in a win over Wakefield Trinity.

A teacher by profession, Broadfoot taught for a number of years at the Newtown state school in Toowoomba.
