= Bill Richards (rugby league) =

Australian rugby league footballer (1896–1968)

Personal information
- Full name: William Richards
- Born: 4 August 1896 Bundaberg, Queensland, Australia
- Died: 14 July 1968 (aged 71) Sydney, NSW, Australia

Playing information
- Position: Second-row, Lock
Club
Years	Team	Pld	T	G	FG	P
1922	Newtown Jets	2	0	0	0	0
1923	Eastern Suburbs	14	1	0	0	3
	Total	16	1	0	0	3
Representative
Years	Team	Pld	T	G	FG	P
1919–22	Queensland	12	2	1	0	8
1920–22	Australia	5	0	0	0	0

William Richards (4 August 1896 – 14 July 1968) was an Australian rugby league footballer.

Originally with Brisbane club Wests, Richards represented Australia from 1920 to 1922, as both a lock forward and second-row. He appeared in all three home internationals against Great Britain in 1920 and was in the Kangaroos squad for their 1921–22 tour of Great Britain, where he gained further caps against the British and Welsh sides.

Richards joined Newtown in the 1922 NSWRFL season, having come to Sydney as the only Queenslander selected to an "Australasian" side for a match against the Kangaroos. He moved to Eastern Suburbs in 1923 and was a second rower in their premiership team. After two seasons in Sydney, Richards returned to Queensland.
