= John Wilson (cyclist) =

Scottish cyclist

Personal information
- Born: 17 November 1876 Muirdean, Aberdeenshire
- Died: 24 November 1957 (aged 81) Leeds, Yorkshire

Cycling career
- Sport: Cycling

John Wilson (17 November 1876 – 24 November 1957) was a Scottish rugby league administrator and road racing cyclist who competed in the 1912 Summer Olympics. Wilson was born in Muirden, Aberdeenshire.

In 1912, he was a member of the Scotland cycling team, which finished fourth in the team time trial event. In the individual time trial competition he finished 16th.

== Rugby League ==
For many years, Wilson was an official of Hull Kingston Rovers and, in 1920, was named as one of the two tour managers for the 1920 Great Britain Lions tour to Australia and New Zealand. On his return from the tour he was appointed as the first paid secretary of the Rugby Football League then known as the Northern Union. He remained secretary until retirement in 1946.
