= Alf Milnes =

Personal information
- Full name: Alfred Milnes
- Born: 7 December 1893 Sowerby Bridge, England
- Died: Unknown

Playing information
- Position: Hooker
Club
Years	Team	Pld	T	G	FG	P
1916–26	Halifax	174	10	3	0	36
1926–28	Huddersfield
	Total	174	10	3	0	36
Representative
Years	Team	Pld	T	G	FG	P
1920	Great Britain	2	0	0	0	0

Alfred "Alf" Milnes (born 1893) was an English professional rugby league footballer who played in the 1920s. He played at representative level for Great Britain, and at club level for Halifax, as a hooker.

== Playing career ==
=== Club career ===
Born in Sowerby Bridge, Milnes was signed by Halifax, and emerged as the club's starting hooker when competitive rugby league resumed after the end of the First World War. Milnes played for Halifax in their defeat against Leigh in the 1921 Challenge Cup final. Following the 1924–25 season, Milnes lost his first team place to Cyril Halliday.

In August 1926, he was transferred to Huddersfield. He played for Huddersfield until October 1928.

=== International honours ===
Milnes was selected to go on the 1920 Great Britain Lions tour of Australasia. He won caps for Great Britain while at Halifax in 1920 against Australia (2 matches).
