= Albert Johnston (rugby league) =

Australian rugby league player and coach

Personal information
- Full name: Albert Victor Johnston
- Born: 10 May 1891 Balmain, New South Wales, Australia
- Died: 15 May 1961 (aged 70) Carlton, New South Wales, Australia

Playing information
- Position: Centre
Club
Years	Team	Pld	T	G	FG	P
1912–17	Balmain	78	6	0	0	18
1919–20	Newtown	22	3	0	0	9
1921–22	St. George	9	0	0	0	0
	Total	109	9	0	0	27
Representative
Years	Team	Pld	T	G	FG	P
1913–22	New South Wales	6	2	0	0	6
1919–22	Australia	8	2	0	0	6

Coaching information
Club
Years	Team	Gms	W	D	L	W%
1923,25–26	Newtown	51	16			31
1924	Western Suburbs	8	4			50
1933–35	St George	50	27	0	23	54
	Total	109	47	0	23	43
Representative
Years	Team	Gms	W	D	L	W%
1939–46	New South Wales
1946	Australia	3	0	1	2	0

Albert "Ricketty" Johnston (1891–1961) was a pioneering Australian rugby league footballer who played in the 1910s and 1920s, and coached from the 1920s to the 1940s. He was a three-quarter for the Australian national team, and played in eight tests between 1919 and 1922, two as captain.

== Playing career ==
=== Club career ===
He was born and grew up in Balmain, Sydney, and started playing rugby league at a junior level when the game commenced in Australia in 1908. In 1911 he made his first grade debut with the Balmain Tigers at half-back. Following Arthur Halloway's move to the Tigers in 1915, Johnston moved to five-eighth and their strong halves partnership was one of factors enabling Balmain to three consecutive premiership titles from 1915 to 1917.

He joined Wests for the 1918 season, then spent two years as captain-coach at Newtown 1919–20.

Following his Australian representative appearances in 1920 the admission of the St George Dragons meant that Johnston being a local resident had to play with the club, which he did for his final two club seasons of 1921 and 1922.

=== Representative career ===
In 1912 he was selected in a Sydney Metropolis side. In 1913 he was in a New South Wales touring squad to New Zealand as half-back but was kept out of the major matches by the form of his peer Arthur Halloway.

He captained New South Wales in some 1918 games and then made his Australian Test debut in 1919 on Australia's tour of New Zealand. He scored a try on debut assisting Australia to a 44–21 victory. With tour captain Halloway unfit for the 3rd Test Johnston led the side to a series victory in Auckland in the process becoming Australia's 11th Kangaroo captain.

In 1920 Johnston was chosen for the first Test of the domestic Ashes series. He captained the side to an 8–4 victory over England.Herb Gilbert took over as captain for the 2nd and 3rd Tests but Johnston's continued successful halves pairing with Queenslander Duncan Thompson set a platform for the talented backline featuring Harold Horder, Dick Vest and Gilbert, and Australia won the series and the Ashes for the first time on home soil.

Johnston did not captain Australia again. He appeared for New South Wales through till 1922 and toured with the 1921-22 Kangaroos playing in the 1st Test and in 11 tour matches.

=== Coaching career ===
Johnston coached Newtown in 1923, 1925 and 1926 and Wests in 1924.

He coached St George in 1933-35 taking the club to their first premiership final.

== Accolades ==
He was awarded Life Membership of the New South Wales Rugby League in 1938.

He was a state selector from 1938 and state coach from 1939 to 1946. He was a national selector in 1946 and coach of the national side for the 1946 first post-WWII Anglo-Australian series.

== Sources & Footnotes ==
- Whiticker, Alan (2004) Captaining the Kangaroos, New Holland, Sydney

Sporting positions
Preceded by Arthur Halloway; 1919	Captain Australia; 1919-1920	Succeeded by Herb Gilbert; 1920
