= James Muirden =

James Muirden (born 1942) is a British astronomer and author of more than thirty books. He has formerly been a film reviewer and telescope maker. Muirden is a member of the British Astronomical Association. He lives in Devon, England.

== Selected bibliography ==
- Astronomy with Binoculars (Faber, 1963)
- Amateur Astronomer's Handbook (Crowell, 1968)
- Beginner's Guide to Astronomical Telescope Making (Transatlantic Arts, 1976)
- Observational Astronomy for Amateurs (Enslow Publishers, 1982)
- Observer's Guide to Halley's Comet (Arco Pub, 1985)
- A Rhyming History of Britain (Walker and Company, 2003)
- The Cosmic Verses: A Rhyming History of the Universe (Walker and Company, 2007)
