= 1920–21 Challenge Cup =

Rugby league competition

- Duration: 5 rounds
- Winners: Leigh
- Runners-up: Halifax

The 1920–21 Challenge Cup was the 21st staging of rugby league's oldest knockout competition.

== First round ==
| Date | Team one | Score one | Team two | Score two |
|---|---|---|---|---|
| 26 Feb | Askam | 2 | Bradford Northern | 7 |
| 26 Feb | Dewsbury | 12 | Hull Kingston Rovers | 0 |
| 26 Feb | Featherstone Rovers | 41 | Pendlebury | 0 |
| 26 Feb | Halifax | 5 | Batley | 0 |
| 26 Feb | Hull FC | 5 | Warrington | 5 |
| 26 Feb | Hunslet | 7 | Leeds | 8 |
| 26 Feb | Keighley | 5 | Rochdale Hornets | 10 |
| 26 Feb | Leigh | 0 | York | 0 |
| 26 Feb | Oldham | 41 | Elland Wanderers | 5 |
| 26 Feb | St Helens Recs | 9 | Wigan | 6 |
| 26 Feb | St Helens | 0 | Bramley | 7 |
| 26 Feb | Salford | 4 | Barrow | 0 |
| 26 Feb | Swinton | 25 | Hull BOCM | 5 |
| 26 Feb | Wakefield Trinity | 4 | Huddersfield | 8 |
| 26 Feb | Widnes | 41 | Dearham | 5 |
| 26 Feb | Wigan Highfield | 10 | Broughton Rangers | 15 |
| 02 Mar | Warrington | 16 | Hull FC | 5 |
| 02 Mar | York | 0 | Leigh | 3 |

== Second round ==
| Date | Team one | Score one | Team two | Score two |
|---|---|---|---|---|
| 12 Mar | Bradford Northern | 7 | Swinton | 3 |
| 12 Mar | Bramley | 4 | Halifax | 13 |
| 12 Mar | Broughton Rangers | 3 | Rochdale Hornets | 5 |
| 12 Mar | Featherstone Rovers | 0 | Dewsbury | 22 |
| 12 Mar | Huddersfield | 8 | Oldham | 3 |
| 12 Mar | Leigh | 10 | Warrington | 10 |
| 12 Mar | St Helens Recs | 0 | Widnes | 7 |
| 12 Mar | Salford | 0 | Leeds | 21 |
| 16 Mar | Warrington | 3 | Leigh | 8 |

== Quarterfinals ==
| Date | Team one | Score one | Team two | Score two |
|---|---|---|---|---|
| 02 Apr | Dewsbury | 0 | Rochdale Hornets | 0 |
| 02 Apr | Halifax | 5 | Widnes | 2 |
| 02 Apr | Huddersfield | 5 | Leeds | 3 |
| 02 Apr | Leigh | 7 | Bradford Northern | 0 |
| 05 Apr | Rochdale Hornets | 5 | Dewsbury | 2 |

== Semifinals ==
| Date | Team one | Score one | Team two | Score two |
|---|---|---|---|---|
| 16 Apr | Halifax | 2 | Huddersfield | 0 |
| 16 Apr | Leigh | 10 | Rochdale Hornets | 0 |

== Final ==
Leigh defeated Halifax 13-0 in the final played at The Cliff, Broughton in front of a crowd of 25,000.

This was Leigh’s first Challenge Cup final win in their first final appearance.

30 April 1921

| Leigh | 13 – 0 | Halifax |
|---|---|---|
| Tries: Thomas (2), Parkinson; Goals: Clarkson (2) |

The Cliff, Broughton
Attendance: 25,000
Referee: F. Renton (Hunslet)

| FB | 1 | Tommy Clarkson |
| RW | 2 | Fred Hurst |
| RC | 3 | Peter Heaton |
| LC | 4 | Emlyn Thomas |
| LW | 5 | Cyril Braund |
| SO | 6 | Billy Parkinson |
| SH | 7 | Walter Mooney (c) |
| PR | 8 | Jim Winstanley |
| HK | 9 | Joe Cartwright |
| PR | 10 | Jack Prosser |
| SR | 11 | Joe Darwell |
| SR | 12 | Fred Coffey |
| LF | 13 | Ernie Boardman |
Coach:

| FB | 1 | Clem Garforth |
| RW | 2 | Reg Turnbull |
| RC | 3 | Albert Ackroyd |
| LC | 4 | Cyril Stacey |
| LW | 5 | Frank Todd |
| SO | 6 | Bobby Lloyd |
| SH | 7 | Stuart Prosser |
| PR | 8 | Tom Gibson |
| HK | 9 | Alf Milnes |
| PR | 10 | Clifford Broadbent |
| SR | 11 | Jack Beames |
| SR | 12 | Selwyn Whiteley |
| LF | 13 | Tom Schofield |
Coach:
