= Charles Fraser (rugby league) =

Australian rugby league coach and player

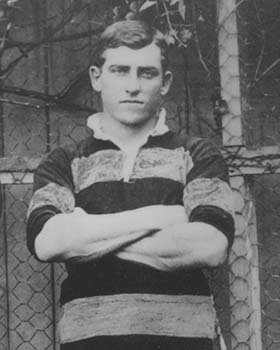

Personal information
- Born: 11 January 1893 Balmain, New South Wales, Australia
- Died: 31 January 1981 (aged 88) Balmain, New South Wales

Playing information
- Position: Fullback, Centre
Club
Years	Team	Pld	T	G	FG	P
1910–26	Balmain	190	54	165	0	492
Representative
Years	Team	Pld	T	G	FG	P
1915–21	New South Wales	12	3	5	0	19
1911–20	Australia	14	2	1	0	8
1911–15	Metropolis	4	0	0	0	0

Coaching information
Club
Years	Team	Gms	W	D	L	W%
1921–32	Balmain	97	55	8	34	57

Charles "Chook" Fraser (1893–1981) was an Australian rugby league footballer and later coach. He was a versatile three-quarter for the Australian national team. He played in 11 Tests between 1911 and 1920 as captain on 3 occasions. He is considered one of the nation's finest footballers of the 20th century

== Balmain ==
Chook Fraser was born in Short Street, Birchgrove in 1893. A Balmain junior, Fraser was graded with the Balmain Tigers at age 17, before an extraordinary seventeen year first grade career for the club at either fullback or centre from 1910 to 1926.

He was member of Balmain's premiership winning sides of 1915, 1916, 1917, 1919, 1920 and 1924. His 185 first grade games stood as the Balmain club record for more than four decades. He was the NSW Rugby Football League's top point scorer in 1916 and 1917.

He was selected in both the Wests Tigers Team of the Century and the Balmain Tigers Team of the Century in the position of centre.

== Representative career ==
Fraser seated three right of circled player 1921–22 Kangaroos

In only his second year in first grade with just 15 games to his credit and still aged 18, Fraser was selected for the 1911–12 Kangaroo Tour of England. He made his Test debut at full-back against England in the 1st Test of 1911 at Newcastle upon Tyne and played in twenty other tour matches. He was the youngest Australian footballer to play Test football (18 years 301 days) when he toured with the 1911–12 Kangaroos until surpassed by Brad Fittler in 1990 and then by Israel Folau in 2007.

He made his state debut for New South Wales in 1912 against New Zealand. He made a further nine state appearances during his career against Queensland or visiting International sides.

He made ten further Test appearances (at home against the 1914 and 1920 Lions, while touring New Zealand in 1919 and then on his second Kangaroo tour of 1921–22, with fellow Balmain players Reg Latta, Jimmy Craig and Bill Schultz playing seven times at full-back and three times at five-eighth. The 1919 touring side of New Zealand was the first Australian full Test side to cross the Tasman. With the world still recovering from World War I and in the midst of the deadly Spanish flu pandemic, the team could only find passage to New Zealand on a cockroach and rat-infested cargo ship out of Newcastle harbour. Half-way across the Tasman, bites from the ship-bred vermin led to Fraser and Duncan Thompson falling victim to blood-poisoned legs.

His first appearance as captain of the Kangaroos was the first test of the 1921–22 Kangaroo tour of Great Britain. He led the side in all three Tests of that series.

== Post-playing ==
He coached Balmain on two separate occasions.

He coached a Gundagai side to success in a country competition in 1926 before returning to coach the Balmain Tigers in 1932. He remained involved with the Balmain club in the 1950s and 1960s as a talent scout and lived at Dock Road, Balmain with wife Veronica for the rest of his long life. He told Tom Goodman in the Sun Herald in 1978, "I'm 85 but I'm still a fan. I never miss a game at Leichhardt and I go to the S.C.G. for all the big games." In the same article Fraser stated that Dally Messenger was greatest player he had ever seen play Rugby League.

Chook Fraser's favourite hobby was sailing. He was a life member of the 18 footer sailing league in Sydney, and was a crew member of several noted boats and skiffs of his era. Charles' third son Jim, also an avid sailor, went on to win the 18-footers World Championship in 1958 sailing in "Jantzen Girl."

Chook Fraser died at Birchgrove in 1981, age 88. He was survived by six children, 17 grandchildren and 6 great-grandchildren, and was buried at Field of Mars Cemetery on 3 February 1981.

In 2006, Fraser was inducted into the Australian Rugby League Hall of Fame. In February 2008, Fraser was named in the list of Australia's 100 Greatest Players (1908–2007) which was commissioned by the NRL and ARL to celebrate the code's centenary year in Australia.

== Sources ==
- Whiticker, Alan (2004) Captaining the Kangaroos, New Holland, Sydney
- Andrews, Malcolm (2006) The ABC of Rugby League Austn Broadcasting Corpn, Sydney
- Centenary Test Game Day Souvenir Program (2008), News Magazines, Surry Hills, Sydney

Sporting positions
Preceded by Herb Gilbert	Captain Australia; 1921–1922	Succeeded by Jim Craig
