= Ben Gronow =

Great Britain and Wales dual-code rugby footballer

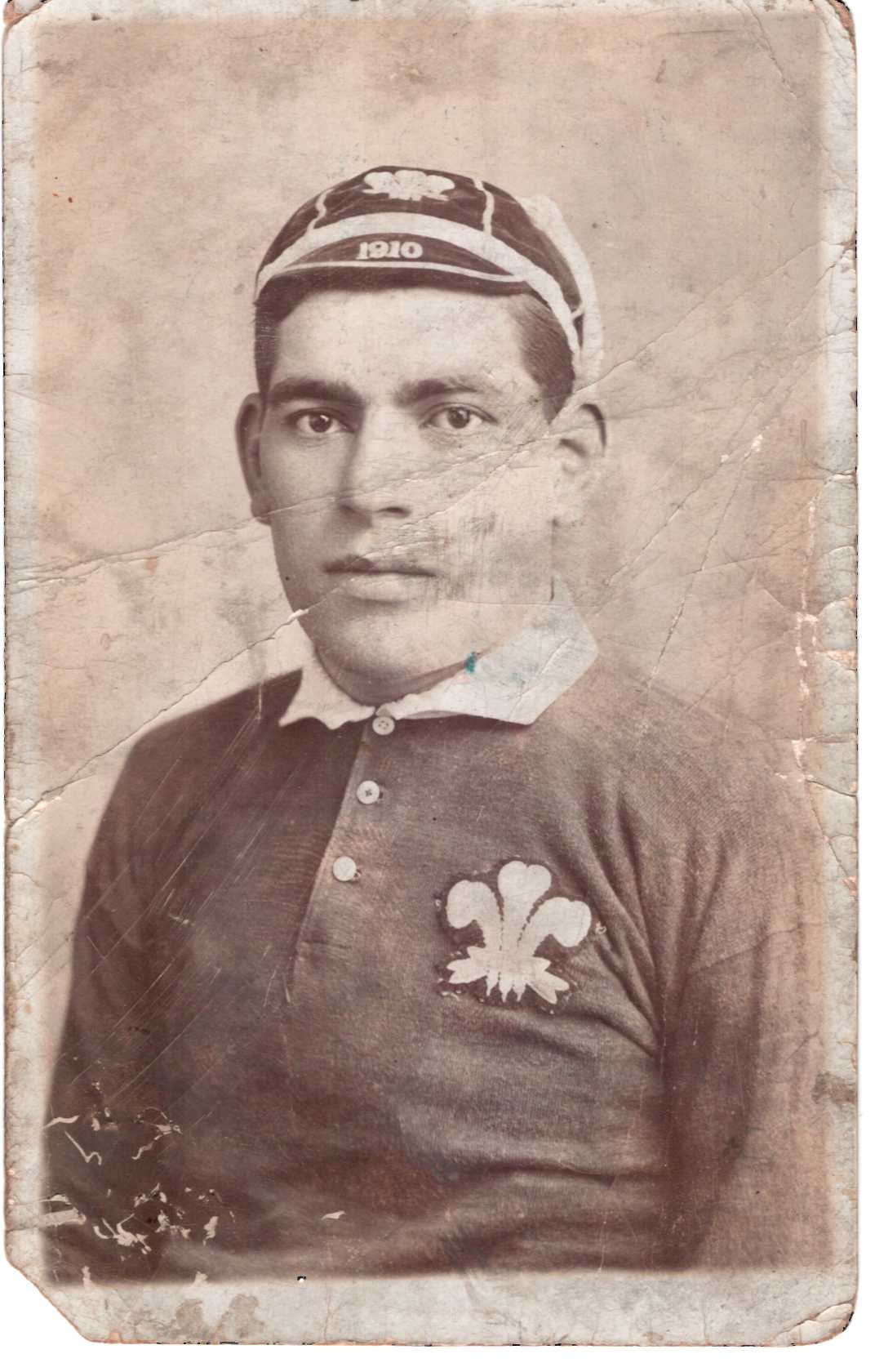

Personal information
- Full name: Benjamin Gronow
- Born: 10 March 1887 Bridgend, Wales
- Died: 24 November 1967 (aged 80) Huddersfield, West Riding of Yorkshire, England

Playing information

Rugby union
- Position: Forwards
Club
Years	Team	Pld	T	G	FG	P
190?–10	Bridgend
	Glamorgan County
	Total	0	0	0	0	0
Representative
Years	Team	Pld	T	G	FG	P
1910	Wales	4	1	0	0	3

Rugby league
- Position: Forward
Club
Years	Team	Pld	T	G	FG	P
1910–25	Huddersfield	392	80	667	0	1574
1926–27	Grenfell
1927–28	Huddersfield	3	0	6	0	12
1928–29	Batley	16	0	22	0	44
1929–30	Featherstone	23	2	43	0	92
	Total	434	82	738	0	1722
Representative
Years	Team	Pld	T	G	FG	P
1910–23	Wales	8	0	9	0	18
1911–20	Great Britain	7	0	11	0	22
1921	Other Nationalities	2	1	5	0	13

Coaching information

Rugby union
Club
Years	Team	Gms	W	D	L	W%
	Morley

Rugby league
Club
Years	Team	Gms	W	D	L	W%
1927–28	Huddersfield

Benjamin Gronow (10 March 1887 – 24 November 1967) was a Welsh dual-code international rugby union, and professional rugby league footballer who played in the 1900s, 1910s and 1920s. At club level Gronow played under the union code for Bridgend RFC, county rugby for Glamorgan, and international rugby for Wales. He was often used as a utility forward. When he switched to professional league rugby he represented Huddersfield (two spells), Grenfell, Batley and Featherstone Rovers (captain), while at representative level, Gronow played for Great Britain and Wales. His playing position varied under the league code being used as a goal-kicking forward.

== Playing career ==
While playing rugby union at Bridgend RFC, in 1910 Gronow won four caps for Wales. Gronow won eight caps for Wales under the league code, between 1910 and 1923 while playing for Huddersfield. Gronow was also capped for the Great Britain rugby league team while at Huddersfield, in 1911 against Australia (2 matches), and after being selected for the 1920 Great Britain Lions tour of Australasia, against Australia (2 matches), and New Zealand (3 matches).

Ben Gronow played as a forward in Huddersfield's 2–8 defeat by Wakefield Trinity in the 1910 Yorkshire Cup Final during the 1910–11 season at Headingley, Leeds on Saturday 3 December 1910, played as a forward and scored 4-goals in the 18–8 victory over Dewsbury in the 1918–19 Yorkshire Cup Final during the 1918–19 season at Headingley, Leeds on Saturday 17 May 1919, played as a forward and scored 3-goals in the 24–5 victory over Leeds in the 1919–20 Yorkshire Cup Final during the 1919–20 season at Thrum Hall, Halifax on Saturday 29 November 1919, and played as a forward and scored a goal in the 4–10 defeat by Hull F.C. in the 1923 Yorkshire Cup Final during the 1923–24 season at Headingley, Leeds on Saturday 24 November 1923.

Gronow also played at least one game for the Other Nationalities team, on 5 February 1921 against England. The game was notable for the Other Nationalities side being entirely composed of Welsh players; but despite approaches to have the game recognised as a 'Wales' v England encounter the rugby league authorities refused to accept the request. Gronow became one of less than twenty-five Welshmen to have scored more than 1000-points in their rugby league career.

Gronow was selected for Great Britain while at Huddersfield for the 1924 Great Britain Lions tour of Australia and New Zealand, he did not play in any of the Test matches on this tour.

In 1925 Gronow became the first British player to move down under when he went from Huddersfield to Grenfell, New South Wales as their coach but returned two years later.

Ben Gronow made his début for Featherstone Rovers on Wednesday 13 March 1929.

Ben Gronow appears to have scored no drop-goals (or field-goals as they are currently known in Australasia), but prior to the 1974–75 season all goals, whether; conversions, penalties, or drop-goals, scored 2-points, consequently prior to this date drop-goals were often not explicitly documented, therefore '0' drop-goals may indicate drop-goals not recorded, rather than no drop-goals scored. In addition, prior to the 1949–50 season, the archaic field-goal was also still a valid means of scoring points.

== Coaching career ==
Gronow was the coach for rugby union team Morley R.F.C. in the 1930s, however when a history of the club was produced some years later, due to his previous rugby league associations, he was identified as 'unknown' in a team photograph.
