= George McGowan (rugby league) =

Australian rugby league footballer

Personal information
- Full name: George Gilchrist McGowan
- Born: 17 December 1890 Sydney, New South Wales, Australia
- Died: 8 March 1970 (aged 79) Macquarie Fields, New South Wales, Australia

Playing information
- Position: Five-eighth, Halfback
Club
Years	Team	Pld	T	G	FG	P
1915	Eastern Suburbs	10	1	3	0	9
1916–18	South Sydney	39	4	11	0	34
1919–22	Western Suburbs	24	4	2	0	16
	Total	73	9	16	0	59

George Gilchrist McGowan (1890–1970) was a pioneer rugby league footballer in the New South Wales Rugby League.

McGowan, a half-back, joined Easts Juniors in 1911 as a 20-year-old. He played Presidents Cup with Easts in 1913 and played first grade with Eastern Suburbs in the 1915 season.

He then joined South Sydney for three seasons between 1916 and 1918. George McGowan played in the 1916 Premiership Final for Souths.

McGowan finished his Rugby League career at Western Suburbs, where he played three seasons: 1919, 1920 and 1922. He coached the Young, New South Wales Rugby League team in 1925.

A long time resident of Macquarie Fields, New South Wales, he died there on 8 March 1970, age 79.
