= William Reid (rugby league) =

GB & England international rugby league footballer

Personal information
- Born: c. 1888
- Died: December 1955 (aged 67)

Playing information
Club
Years	Team	Pld	T	G	FG	P
1909–26/27	Widnes	449	102	2	0	310
Representative
Years	Team	Pld	T	G	FG	P
1914	England	1	1	0	0	3
1920	Great Britain	0	0	0	0	0

William Reid (c. 1888 – December 1955) was an English professional rugby league footballer who played in the 1910s and 1920s. He played at representative level for Great Britain (non-Test matches), and England, and at club level for Widnes.

Reid won a cap for England while at Widnes in 1914 against Wales. Reid played in Widnes' victory in the Lancashire County League during the 1919–20 season. He was then selected for Great Britain while at Widnes for the 1920 Great Britain Lions tour of Australia and New Zealand.
