= George Rees (rugby) =

Welsh rugby league & union footballer

Personal information
- Born: 17 September 1892 Neath, Wales
- Died: unknown

Playing information

Rugby union
- Position: Three-quarters
Club
Years	Team	Pld	T	G	FG	P
	Ammanford
	Neath
	Total	0	0	0	0	0

Rugby league
- Position: Prop
Club
Years	Team	Pld	T	G	FG	P
1914–2?	Leeds	135	49
Representative
Years	Team	Pld	T	G	FG	P
1920	Great Britain	0	0	0	0	0

George Rees (17 September 1892 – death unknown) was a Welsh rugby union and professional rugby league footballer who played in the 1910s and 1920s. He played club level rugby union (RU) for Ammanford RFC (captain), and Neath RFC, as a three-quarter, e.g. wing, or centre, and representative level rugby league (RL) for Great Britain (non-Test Matches), and at club level for Leeds as a prop. George Rees was a bombardier during World War I.

== Biography ==
Rees was the younger brother of the rugby union footballers for Ammanford RFC; David Rees, Bill Rees and Tom Rees. Rees was the captain of the Ammanford RFC 1912–1914 "Invincibles", who did not concede a try for three seasons.

Rees made his début for Leeds on Saturday 5 September 1914, he played at prop in Leeds' 2–35 defeat by Huddersfield in the Championship Final during the 1914–15 season. Rees was selected for Great Britain (RL) while at Leeds for the 1920 Great Britain Lions tour of Australia and New Zealand, although he did not play in any of the Test matches on this tour.
