= Joe Bowers =

Personal information
- Full name: Joseph Bowers
- Born: unknown Barrow-in-Furness, England
- Died: February 1946 Rochdale, England

Playing information
- Position: Prop
Club
Years	Team	Pld	T	G	FG	P
	Barrow
1909–≥20	Rochdale Hornets
	Total	0	0	0	0	0
Representative
Years	Team	Pld	T	G	FG	P
	Lancashire
1920	Great Britain	1	1	0	0	3

Joseph Bowers was a professional rugby league footballer who played in the 1900s, 1910s and 1920s. He played at representative level for Great Britain and Lancashire, and at club level for Rochdale Hornets, as a prop.

Bowers was selected to go on the 1920 Great Britain Lions tour of Australasia. He won a cap for Great Britain against New Zealand.

Bowers signed for Rochdale Hornets during October 1909, he made his début for Rochdale Hornets against Merthyr Tydfil RLFC.

Bowers was the landlord of The Fusiliers public house, Rochdale (now closed).
