= Joe Doyle (rugby league, born 1894) =

GB international rugby league footballer

Personal information
- Born: first ¼ 1894 Barrow-in-Furness, England
- Died: unknown

Playing information
- Position: Wing, Centre
Club
Years	Team	Pld	T	G	FG	P
1913–??	Barrow	137	61			183
Representative
Years	Team	Pld	T	G	FG	P
1920	Great Britain	0

Joseph Doyle (1894 – unknown) was an English professional rugby league footballer who played in the 1910s and 1920s. He played at the representative level for Great Britain (non-Test matches), and at the club level for Holker Street Old Boys (in Barrow-in-Furness), and Barrow, as a wing or centre.

== Background ==
Joe Doyle's birth was registered in Barrow-in-Furness district, Lancashire, England.

== Playing career ==
Doyle represented Great Britain in eight non-Test matches on the 1920 Great Britain rugby league tour of Australia and New Zealand, scoring eight tries.
