= Stan Whitty =

GB international rugby league footballer

Personal information
- Full name: Stanley Whitty
- Born: c. 1902 unknown
- Died: 17 February 1984 (aged 82); Withernsea, East Riding of Yorkshire, England

Playing information
- Position: Scrum-half
Club
Years	Team	Pld	T	G	FG	P
1919–31	Hull FC	270	69
Representative
Years	Team	Pld	T	G	FG	P
≥1919–≤31	Yorkshire	4
1924	Great Britain	0

Stanley Whitty (c. 1902 – 17 February 1984) was an English professional rugby league footballer who played in the 1910s, 1920s and 1930s. He played at representative level for Great Britain (non-test matches), and Yorkshire, and at club level for Hull FC, as a scrum-half.

== Playing career ==
=== Club career ===
Stan Whitty made his début for Hull FC on Saturday 27 December 1919, and he played his last game for Hull FC on Saturday 25 April 1931.

=== International honours ===
Stan Whitty was selected for Great Britain while at Hull for the 1924 Great Britain Lions tour of Australia and New Zealand, but he did not play in any of the test matches on this tour but played in 14-tour matches, and scored 5-Tries.
