= Ernest Jones (rugby league) =

GB & England international rugby league footballer

- Godfrey Phillips Cigarette card featuring Ernest Jones

Personal information
- Full name: Ernest W. Jones
- Born: c. 1891 Somerset, England
- Died: 1971 (aged 80)

Playing information
- Position: Stand-off, Scrum-half
Club
Years	Team	Pld	T	G	FG	P
1910–≥22	Rochdale Hornets
Representative
Years	Team	Pld	T	G	FG	P
1913–14	England	2	1	0	0	3
1920	Great Britain	4	0	0	0	0

Ernest W. Jones (c. 1891 – 1971) was an English professional rugby league footballer who played in the 1910s and 1920s. He played at representative level for Great Britain and England, and at club level for Rochdale Hornets, as a stand-off or scrum-half.

== Playing career ==
=== Club career ===
Jones played scrum-half and scored a try in Rochdale Hornets' 12–5 victory over Oldham in the 1911–12 Lancashire Cup Final during the 1911–12 season at Wheater's Field, Broughton, Salford on Saturday 2 December 1911, in front of a crowd of 20,000.

Through injury, Jones did not appear in Rochdale Hornets' 10–9 victory over Hull F.C. in the 1921–22 Challenge Cup Final during the 1921–22 season at Headingley, Leeds on Saturday 6 May 1922, Rochdale Hornets had a medal especially struck for him.

=== International honours ===
Jones won caps for England while at Rochdale Hornets in 1913 against Wales, in 1914 against Wales, and he won caps for Great Britain while at Rochdale Hornets in 1920 on the 1920 Great Britain Lions tour against Australia, and New Zealand (3 matches).
