= Evan Davies (rugby) =

GB & Wales international rugby league footballer

Personal information
- Born: unknown Tumble, Wales
- Died: unknown

Playing information
- Height: 5 ft 8 in (1.73 m)
- Weight: 11 st 0 lb (70 kg)

Rugby union
Club
Years	Team	Pld	T	G	FG	P
	Tumble RFC
	Llanelli
	Total	0	0	0	0	0

Rugby league
- Position: Centre
Club
Years	Team	Pld	T	G	FG	P
1911–26	Oldham	321	102	1	0	308
Representative
Years	Team	Pld	T	G	FG	P
1912–23	Wales	3	0	0	0	0
1920	Great Britain	3	0	0	0	0

Evan Davies (birth unknown – death unknown) was a Welsh rugby union, and professional rugby league footballer who played in the 1910s and 1920s. He played club level rugby union (RU) for Tumble RFC and Llanelli RFC, and representative level rugby league (RL) for Great Britain and Wales, and at club level for Oldham, as a centre.

== Playing career ==
Evan Davies was born in Ammanford, Wales.

=== International honours ===
Davies three won caps for Wales (RL) while at Oldham between 1912 and 1923. He was selected to go on the 1920 Great Britain Lions tour of Australia and New Zealand. He won caps for Great Britain while at Oldham in 1920 against New Zealand (3 matches).

=== Championship final appearances ===
Davies played at centre in Oldham's 2–13 defeat by Wigan in the Championship Final during the 1921–22 season at The Cliff, Broughton on Saturday 6 May 1922.

=== Challenge Cup Final appearances ===
About Evan Davies's time, there was Oldham's 16–3 victory over Hull Kingston Rovers in the 1925 Challenge Cup Final during the 1924–25 season at Headingley, and the 3–9 defeat by Swinton in the 1926 Challenge Cup Final during the 1925–26 season at Athletic Grounds, Rochdale.

=== County Cup Final appearances ===
About Evan Davies' time, there was Oldham's 5–7 defeat by Warrington in the 1921 Lancashire Cup Final during the 1921–22 season at The Cliff, Broughton, Salford on Saturday 3 December 1921, and played at centre in the 10–0 victory over St Helens Recs in the 1924 Lancashire Cup Final during the 1924–25 season at The Willows, Salford on Saturday 22 November 1924.
