= Herman Hilton =

Great Britain and England international rugby league footballer

Personal information
- Full name: Herman Hilton
- Born: first ¼ 1894 Springhead, Oldham, England
- Died: first ¼ 1947 (aged 52–53) Blackpool England

Playing information
- Height: 5 ft 11 in (1.80 m)
- Weight: 14 st 0 lb (89 kg)
- Position: Prop, Second-row, Loose forward
Club
Years	Team	Pld	T	G	FG	P
1913–25	Oldham	253	40	1	0	122
Representative
Years	Team	Pld	T	G	FG	P
191?–2?	Lancashire	2
1921	England	3	1	0	0	3
1920–22	Great Britain	7	4	0	0	12

Herman Hilton (first ¼ 1894 – first ¼ 1947) was an English professional rugby league footballer who played in the 1910s and 1920s. He played at representative level for Great Britain, England, Lancashire, and at club level for Healey Street A.R.L.F.C in Springhead, near Oldham, and Oldham (captain), as a prop, second-row, or loose forward. Hilton is an Oldham Hall Of Fame Inductee.

== Background ==
Herman Hilton's birth was registered in Springhead, near Oldham and his death aged 52–53 was registered in Blackpool, Lancashire,

== Playing career ==
=== Championship final appearances ===
Hilton played at prop in Oldham's 2-13 defeat by Wigan in the Championship Final during the 1921–22 season at The Cliff, Broughton on Saturday 6 May 1922.

=== Challenge Cup Final appearances ===
Herman Hilton played loose forward in Oldham's 4-21 defeat by Wigan in the 1924 Challenge Cup Final during the 1923–24 season at Athletic Grounds, Rochdale on Saturday 12 April 1924, and played loose forward, and was captain in the 16-3 victory over Hull Kingston Rovers in the 1925 Challenge Cup Final during the 1924–25 season at Headingley.

=== County Cup Final appearances ===
About Herman Hilton's time, there was Oldham's 5-7 defeat by Warrington in the 1921 Lancashire Cup Final during the 1921–22 season at The Cliff, Broughton, Salford on Saturday 3 December 1921, he played in Oldham's 7-0 victory over Rochdale Hornets in the 1919–20 Lancashire Cup Final during the 1919–20 season at The Willows, Salford on Saturday 6 December 1919, and played at prop in the 10-0 victory over St Helens Recs in the 1924 Lancashire Cup Final during the 1924–25 season at The Willows, Salford on Saturday 22 November 1924.

=== Club career ===
Herman Hilton transferred from Healey Street ARLFC to Oldham in November 1913, he made his début for Oldham against Leeds at the Watersheddings, Oldham on Monday 15 December 1913, he suffered a serious illness following the end of the 1924–25 season, he attempted a comeback, and he played his last match for Oldham against Wigan in November 1925, after which he retired from playing.

=== International hoonurs ===
Hilton was selected to go on the 1920 Great Britain Lions tour of Australasia. He won caps for Great Britain while at Oldham in 1920 against Australia (3 matches), and New Zealand (3 matches), and in 1922 against Australia. Hilton also won caps for England while at Oldham in 1921 against Wales, Other Nationalities, and Australia.
