= Henry Fewin =

Australian cricketer

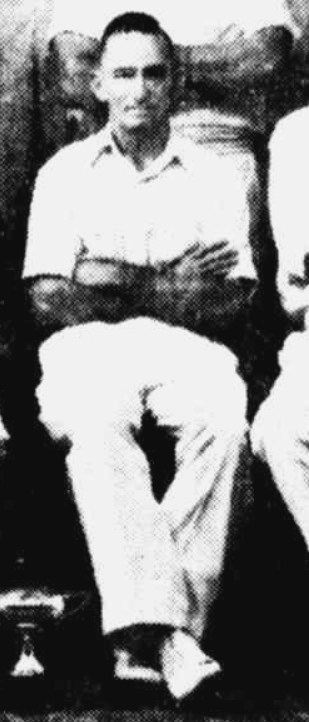

Personal information
- Born: 25 January 1896; Townsville, Queensland, Australia
- Died: 25 August 1980 (aged 84); Bribie Island, Queensland, Australia
- Source: Cricinfo, 3 October 2020

Henry Fewin (25 January 1896 – 25 August 1980) was an Australian international rugby league player. He also played in one first-class cricket match for Queensland in 1929/30.

== See also ==
- List of Queensland first-class cricketers
