= Billy Stone (rugby) =

GB & England international rugby league footballer

- Godfrey Phillips Cigarette card featuring Stone

Personal information
- Full name: William John Stone
- Born: 28 September 1897 Bream, Gloucestershire, England
- Died: 8 November 1976 (aged 79)

Playing information

Rugby union
Club
| Years | Team | Pld | T | G | FG | P |
|---|---|---|---|---|---|---|
| 19??–?? | Bream RFC |

Rugby league
- Position: Wing, Centre, Fullback
Club
| Years | Team | Pld | T | G | FG | P |
|---|---|---|---|---|---|---|
| 1919–27 | Hull FC | 222 | 149 |
Representative
| Years | Team | Pld | T | G | FG | P |
| 1921–23 | England | 6 | 6 | 1 | 0 | 20 |
| 1920–22 | Great Britain | 8 | 8 | 0 | 0 | 24 |

William John Stone (28 September 1897 – 8 November 1976) was an English rugby union and professional rugby league footballer who played in the 1910s and 1920s. He played at representative level for Great Britain and England, and at club level for Hull FC, as a three-quarter back. He was captain of Hull during the 1921–22 and 1922–23 seasons.

== Biography ==
Stone was a blacksmith in Bream, Gloucestershire. He was "discovered" playing for the Bream's rugby union team by talent scouts from Hull FC rugby league club, he then moved to Beverley Road, Hull with his wife Gertie, and his children; William, Hilary, and Esme.

Stone was selected to go on the 1920 Great Britain Lions tour of Australia and New Zealand. He won caps for Great Britain while at Hull in 1920 against Australia (3 matches), and New Zealand (3 matches), and in 1921–22 against Australia (2 matches).

Stone also won caps for England while at Hull in 1921 against Wales, Other Nationalities and Australia, in 1922 against Wales, in 1923 against Wales (2 matches).

Stone played fullback in Hull FC's 9–10 defeat by Rochdale Hornets in the 1922 Challenge Cup Final during the 1921–22 season at Headingley, Leeds, in front of a crowd of 34,827.

Hull F.C. were just one-point behind Rochdale Hornets when second-row Bob Taylor scored a try in the dying minutes, however Billy Stone was unable to score the conversion and Rochdale Hornets won the 1922 Challenge Cup.
