= Jonty Parkin =

Former Great Britain and England international rugby league footballer

- Cigarette card featuring Jonty Parkin

Personal information
- Full name: Jonathan Parkin
- Born: 5 November 1894 Sharlston, Wakefield, West Riding of Yorkshire, England
- Died: 9 April 1972 (aged 77) Wakefield, England

Playing information
- Height: 5 ft 7 in (170 cm)
- Weight: 11 st 3 lb (71 kg; 157 lb)
- Position: Stand-off, Scrum-half
Club
| Years | Team | Pld | T | G | FG | P |
|---|---|---|---|---|---|---|
| 1913–30 | Wakefield Trinity | 349 | 96 | 94 | | 476 |
| 1930–32 | Hull Kingston Rovers | 57 | 11 | 28 | | 89 |
| | Total | 406 | 107 | 122 | 0 | 565 |
Representative
| Years | Team | Pld | T | G | FG | P |
| 1919–28 | Yorkshire | 17 | 8 | 2 | | 28 |
| 1921–28 | England | 12 | 6 | 5 | | 28 |
| 1920–30 | Great Britain | 17 | 9 | 0 | | 27 |

Jonathan "Jonty" Parkin (1894–1972) was an English professional rugby league footballer who played the 1910s, 1920s and 1930s. One of the nine inaugural inductees of the Rugby Football League Hall of Fame, he toured Australia three times, twice as captain of Great Britain, earning 17 Test caps. Parkin played at stand-off or scrum-half, and also captained England for whom he made 12 appearances, as well as 17 for Yorkshire. Parkin gave the Wakefield Trinity club seventeen years' service, including victory in the 1924–25 Yorkshire Cup.

== Background ==
Parkin was born in Sharlston on 5 November 1894, and later played for the Sharlston rugby league club.

== Playing career ==
=== Wakefield Trinity ===
Parkin joined Wakefield Trinity as an 18-year-old in 1913. He would go on to become captain of the club. Parkin played stand-off in Wakefield Trinity's 0–6 defeat by Hull F.C. in the 1913–14 Challenge Cup Final at Thrum Hall, Halifax, in front of a crowd of 19,000, He also won caps for Yorkshire while at Wakefield Trinity.

Parkin played scrum-half in Wakefield Trinity's 9–8 victory over Batley in the 1924–25 Yorkshire Cup Final at Headingley, Leeds on Saturday 22 November 1924, and played scrum-half in the 3–10 defeat by Huddersfield in the 1926–27 Yorkshire Cup Final during the 1926–27 season at Headingley, Leeds on Wednesday 1 December 1926. Parkin played stand-off in Wakefield Trinity's 3–29 defeat by Australia in the 1921–22 Kangaroo tour of Great Britain match at Belle Vue, Wakefield on Saturday 22 October 1921.

=== Hull Kingston Rovers ===
Parkin decided he wanted to leave Wakefield Trinity in 1930, at the age of thirty-four, and he was put on the transfer list at £100 (equivalent to £7,986 in 2023). For some reason, Hull Kingston Rovers couldn't, or wouldn't, find the money. So Parkin paid the fee himself to secure his release. The game's by-laws were adjusted shortly afterwards, so that no player could ever do that again. He remained with the club until his retirement in 1932.

Jonathan Parkin: Joined Trinity as a youth in 1913 from Sharlston and played his first senior game at Bradford Northern on 19 April 1913. A most distinguished career, which covered 18 years in "Trinity's Red, White and Blue," included the following Test appearances:- 1920 (Brisbane and Sydney (1 and 2)), 1921 (Headingley, Leeds and the Boulevard, Hull), 1924 (Sydney 1 and 2 and Brisbane), 1928 (Sydney (1)), 1929 (Headingley, Leeds) and 1930 (Station Road, Swinton). It will be seen that Jonty made three tours to Australia. A footballer can have no higher testimony than to retain the confidence of all ruling officials over a period of years. For many years Jonty Parkin was chosen as captain of Wakefield Trinity, Yorkshire and Great Britain, and that is sufficient proof of his ability. So long as football is discussed in Wakefield his name will be remembered. Described by Jim Brough as the toughest scrum half he ever played with or against, Parkin's last two seasons of his career were spent with Hull Kingston Rovers His association with Wakefield Trinity continued after the Second World War when, from 1947 to 1950, he was a member of the Trinity Committee.

=== Representative honours ===
Parkin represented Yorkshire in the county championship. In 1921, he scored five tries in a game against Cumberland, and is the only player to ever achieve this in a county match.

Parkin was selected to go on the 1920 Great Britain Lions tour of Australasia, and went on be capped 17 times for Great Britain. He was selected as captain for the 1924 and 1928 Lions tours, making him one of only three players (alongside Harold Wagstaff and Ellery Hanley) to be named captain on multiple tours.

Parkin won caps for England while at Wakefield Trinity in 1921 against Wales, Other Nationalities and Australia, in 1922 against Wales, in 1923 against Wales, in 1924 against Other Nationalities, in 1925 against Wales, in 1926 against Wales and Other Nationalities, in 1927 against Wales, in 1928 against Wales (2 matches).

== Post-playing ==
Parkin served as an administrator of the Wakefield club after retiring from playing. He died in his home town of Wakefield on 9 April 1972 at the age of 77. In 1988 Parkin was one of the inaugural nine inductees into the Rugby Football League Hall of Fame.

== Personal life ==
Parkin was the Landlord of the Griffin Hotel, Bull Ring, Wakefield circa-1921. Parkin married Frances Akeroyd in 1926 and had six children, Patricia, Nadine, Willie (Bill), Geoff, Neal and Trevor, and 17 grandchildren.
