= Squire Stockwell =

English international rugby league footballer (1896–1970)

Personal information
- Full name: Squire Stockwell
- Born: 30 January 1896 Bramley district, Leeds, England
- Died: fourth ¼ 1970 (aged 74) Leeds district, England

Playing information
- Position: Wing
Club
Years	Team	Pld	T	G	FG	P
≤1919–19	Bramley
1919–24	Leeds
1924–25	Hunslet F.C.	11	1	0	0	3
	Total	11	1	0	0	3
Representative
Years	Team	Pld	T	G	FG	P
1920–21	Great Britain	3	1	1	0	5

Squire Stockwell (30 January 1896 – fourth ¼ 1970) was an English professional rugby league footballer who played in the 1910s and 1920s. He played at representative level for Great Britain, and at club level for Bramley, Leeds and Hunslet F.C., as a wing.

== Background ==
Stockwell's birth was registered Bramley district, Leeds, West Riding of Yorkshire, England, he lived on Swinnow Crescent, Pudsey, Leeds, and his death aged 74 was registered in Leeds district, West Riding of Yorkshire, England.

== Playing career ==
=== Club career ===
Stockwell transferred from Bramley to Leeds during February 1919 in exchange for Louis Marshall, and he transferred from Leeds to Hunslet F.C. during August 1924. He made 11 appearances for Hunslet, scoring one try.

=== International honours ===
Stockwell won caps for Great Britain while at Leeds in 1920 against Australia, and in 1921 against Australia (2 matches).
