= Bill Schultz (rugby league, born 1891) =

Australian rugby league footballer

Personal information
- Full name: William James Schultz
- Born: 20 October 1891 Balmain, New South Wales, Australia
- Died: 25 February 1975 (aged 83) Bexley, New South Wales, Australia

Playing information
- Position: Prop, Lock
Club
Years	Team	Pld	T	G	FG	P
1913–24	Balmain	120	12	0	0	36
Representative
Years	Team	Pld	T	G	FG	P
1919–23	New South Wales	14	0	0	0	0
1912–22	Australia	7	0	0	0	0
1914–23	Metropolis	5	0	0	0	0
- Source: As of 1 May 2020

Bill 'Changa' Schultz (1891–1975) was an Australian professional rugby league footballer who played in the 1910s and 1920s. An Australia national and New South Wales state representative prop forward, he played his club football in Sydney for Balmain, with whom he won six premierships between 1915 and 1924.

== Playing career ==
Of German and Irish descent, Schultz was a Balmain junior who also played Australian rules football at the local Christian Brothers with another future Balmain champion, Charles 'Chook' Fraser. Balmain went through the 1915 NSWRFL season undefeated, and Schultz tasted his first premiership success with the club. The following year he played for Balmain at prop forward in the 1916 NSWRFL season's premiership final victory against South Sydney. He again won the premiership with Balmain in the 1917 NSWRFL season.

Schultz seated 6th from left with the 1921-22 Kangaroos.

Chang Schultz was first selected for the Australian national team in 1919, becoming Kangaroo No. 106, and winning another premiership with Balmain that year. He appeared in all three Tests in Australia's Ashes-winning series in 1920, and was again a premiership-winner with Balmain. He was selected to go on the 1921–22 Kangaroo tour of Great Britain, playing in the second Ashes series test victory against the Lions, and in the third test loss, which cost them the title. Schultz played for Balmain at prop forward in the 1924 NSWRFL season's premiership final victory against South Sydney.
