= Arthur Skelhorn =

GB & England international rugby league footballer

Personal information
- Full name: George Arthur Skelhorn
- Born: c. 1888 Warrington, Lancashire, England
- Died: 15 April 1931 (aged 43) Warrington, Lancashire, England

Playing information
- Position: Prop
Club
| Years | Team | Pld | T | G | FG | P |
|---|---|---|---|---|---|---|
| 1911–25 | Warrington | 259 | 49 | 1 | 0 | 149 |
Representative
| Years | Team | Pld | T | G | FG | P |
| 1919–22 | Lancashire | 6 | 0 | 0 | 0 | 0 |
| 1921–23 | England | 3 | 0 | 0 | 0 | 0 |
| 1920–22 | Great Britain | 7 | 0 | 0 | 0 | 0 |

George Arthur Skelhorn, also spelt Skelhorne (c. 1888 – 15 April 1931) was an English professional rugby league footballer who played in the 1910s and 1920s. He played at representative level for Great Britain, England and Lancashire, and at club level for Warrington, as a prop. Skelhorn is an inductee in the Warrington Wolves Hall of Fame.

== Biography ==
Skelhorn made his début for Warrington on Saturday 28 January 1911, and he played his last match for Warrington Saturday 21 March 1925.

Skelhorn was selected to go on the 1920 Great Britain Lions tour of Australasia. He won caps for Great Britain while at Warrington in 1920 against Australia, New Zealand (3 matches), and in 1921-22 against Australia (3 matches).

Skelhorn won caps for England while at Warrington in 1921 against Australia, in 1922 against Wales, and in 1923 against Wales.

After retiring as a player, Skelhorn was elected as a member of the club's management committee. On 15 April 1931, he died of pneumonia, aged 43.
