= 1920–21 Northern Rugby Football Union season =

- League: Championship
- Teams: 25
- Champions: Hull F.C. (2nd title)
- League Leaders: Hull Kingston Rovers
- Runners-up: Hull Kingston Rovers
- Top point-scorer(s): Jimmy Kennedy ( Hull F.C.) (264)
- Top try-scorer(s): (England) Billy Stone ( Hull F.C.) (41)

The 1920–21 Northern Rugby Football Union season was the 26th season of rugby league football.

== Season summary ==
Hull F.C. won their second ever Championship in as many seasons when they defeated local rivals Hull Kingston Rovers 16-14 in the Championship play-off.

Hull Kingston Rovers had ended the regular season as league leaders.

Leigh won the Challenge Cup beating Halifax 13-0 in the final.

Jim Kennedy of Hull F.C. set a club record of 14 goals scored in a match against Rochdale Hornets on 7 April 1921. On 29 January 1921 he had also scored a club record 36 points (4 tries and 12 goals) in a single match against Keighley.

Wigan won the Lancashire League, and Halifax won the Yorkshire League. Broughton Rangers beat Leigh 6–3 to win the Lancashire Cup, and Hull Kingston Rovers beat Hull F.C. 2–0 to win the Yorkshire County Cup.

== Championship ==
	Team	Pld	W	D	L	PF	PA	Pts	Pct
1	Hull Kingston Rovers	32	24	1	7	432	233	49	76.56
2	Hull	36	27	0	9	722	267	54	75
3	Halifax	38	27	0	11	492	184	54	71.05
4	Wigan	34	23	1	10	435	238	47	69.12
5	Swinton	34	22	1	11	289	250	45	66.18
6	Dewsbury	34	20	3	11	349	233	43	63.23
7	York	30	18	1	11	280	225	37	61.67
8	Leeds	34	20	1	13	380	209	41	60.29
9	Broughton Rangers	30	16	3	11	283	164	35	58.33
10	Rochdale Hornets	34	18	2	14	311	301	38	55.88
11	Widnes	30	15	2	13	231	252	32	53.33
12	Barrow	32	17	0	15	328	254	34	53.12
13	Warrington	34	17	2	15	295	289	36	52.94
14	Huddersfield	36	18	2	16	376	283	38	52.78
15	St Helens Recs	30	15	1	14	299	201	31	51.67
16	Batley	32	16	1	15	312	225	33	51.56
17	St. Helens	30	14	0	16	254	304	28	46.67
18	Oldham	34	13	3	18	267	254	29	42.65
19	Wakefield Trinity	34	14	1	19	253	426	29	42.65
20	Leigh	32	10	3	19	173	316	23	35.94
21	Bramley	30	9	0	21	153	371	18	30
22	Hunslet	32	8	1	23	190	298	17	26.56
23	Bradford Northern	32	6	1	25	177	656	13	20.31
24	Keighley	34	5	0	29	159	655	10	14.71
25	Salford	32	2	2	28	111	463	6	9.37

== Championship play-off ==
Semi-finals
1	Hull Kingston Rovers	26
4	Wigan	4
2	Hull	27
3	Halifax	10

Championship final
Hull Kingston Rovers	14
Hull	16

== Challenge Cup ==
Leigh defeated Halifax 13-0 in the final played at Broughton in front of a crowd of 25,000.

This was Leigh’s first Challenge Cup Final win in their first final appearance.

== Sources ==
- 1920-21 Rugby Football League season at wigan.rlfans.com
