= The Cliff (training ground) =

Sports ground in Salford, England

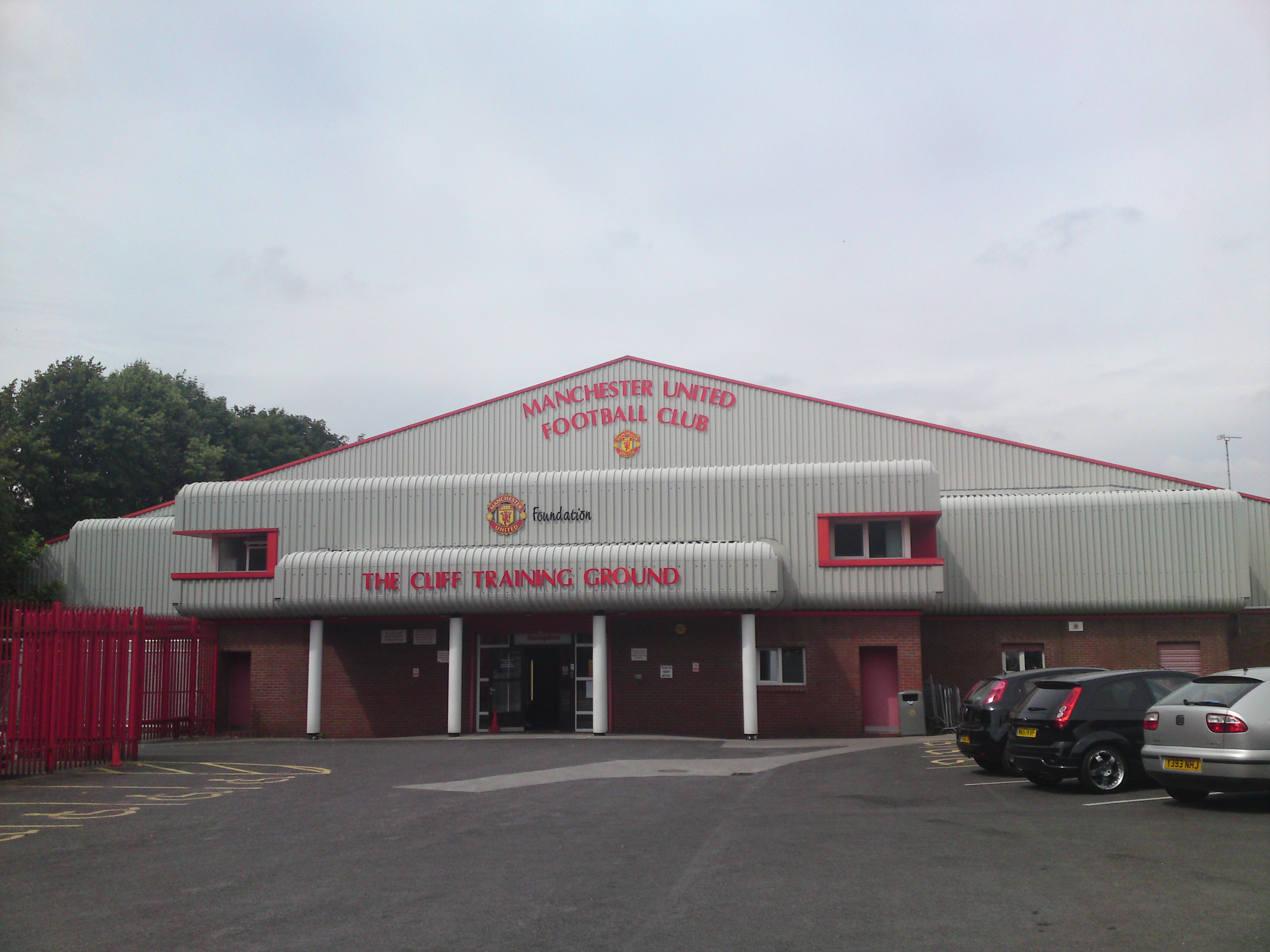
- Interactive map of The Cliff
- Former names: Cliff Point
- Location: Broughton, Salford, Greater Manchester, England
- Coordinates: 53°30′13″N 02°16′07″W
- Owner: Manchester United
- Operator: Manchester United
- Capacity: 1,500
- Surface: Grass

Tenants
- Cricket; Manchester Jewish Cricket Club (c.1900); Rugby league Broughton (1869–1898); Broughton Rangers (1913–1933); Football; Manchester United (1938–present)

The Cliff is a sports ground in Broughton, Salford, England, on the banks of the River Irwell, that was rugby league club Broughton Rangers' home ground until 1933. It was purchased by association football club Manchester United for use as their training ground. It was used as the club's primary training facility until 1999, when it was replaced by the Trafford Training Centre in Carrington, though it continues to host some Manchester United academy matches. It is also sometimes used by Salford rugby league side as a training venue.

== Rugby league ==
The Cliff, on Lower Broughton Road in Broughton, Salford, started out as a cricket and tennis ground. The now-defunct Broughton Rangers rugby league club moved to The Cliff in 1913 and played there until 1933, when they moved to Belle Vue Stadium in Gorton, Manchester.

The ground was host to the 1920–21 Challenge Cup final seeing Leigh defeat Halifax to lift the trophy.

== Association football ==
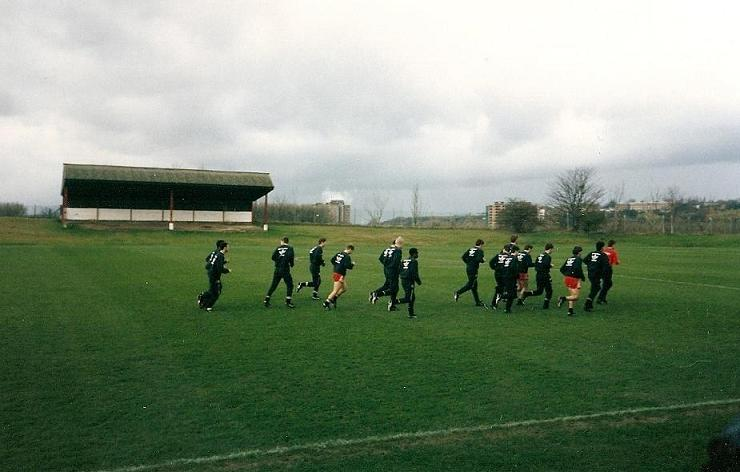
Manchester United players warm up at The Cliff, 1992

In May 1938, the site was earmarked by Manchester United chairman James W. Gibson as a potential site for practice matches and as a regular venue for the Manchester United Junior Athletic Club (MUJAC) A team's matches. By the end of June 1938, a tenancy had been agreed. Manchester United purchased the ground in 1951. Until the late 1950s, Manchester United's first team trained on the pitch at their Old Trafford stadium, but the club's management had decided that using The Cliff training ground was necessary to avoid doing needless damage to the Old Trafford pitch.

Floodlights were soon erected at The Cliff – an improvement that Old Trafford did not receive until March 1957 – and a rugby league amateur international match was held there in 1952. That same year, Manchester United entered their youth team in the FA Youth Cup for the first time. Matches were played at night, meaning that the team had to play under the floodlights at The Cliff. In the second round of the competition, the Manchester United youth team recorded the biggest win in the history of the FA Youth Cup; David Pegg, John Doherty and Duncan Edwards scored five goals each and Eddie Lewis scored four in a 23–0 victory over Nantwich Town's youth team.

At the end of the 20th century, Manchester United manager Alex Ferguson came to feel that The Cliff had become too open to the press and the public for him to successfully run the training of the club's first team players, with journalists and opposition spies able to get a look at his tactics all too easily and supporters holding the players up for hours after training with requests for autographs. The club, therefore, decided to construct a new training facility in Carrington, away from prying eyes. First team, reserve and academy training is now carried out at the Trafford Training Centre, but The Cliff is still retained for the training of the club's youngest players. The England national team has also used the Cliff as a training base ahead of international matches at Old Trafford.

In 2003, plans were put forward by Manchester United for a set of 16-metre-tall (17 yd) floodlights at The Cliff, but this was met with opposition from local residents. The club had originally planned to install 19-metre-tall (21 yd) lights, but this was later reduced.

The ground was earmarked as the home ground and training base for Manchester United women's team ahead of 2018–19 season once redevelopments had been completed. However, this never happened and the team has used Leigh Sports Village as their home stadium since inception.
