= 1910 NSWRFL season =

Rugby league competition

- League: New South Wales Rugby Football League
- Duration: April 30 to September 17
- Teams: 8
- Matches played: 57
- Points scored: 1576
- Premiers: Newtown (1st title)
- Minor Premiers: Newtown
- Wooden spoon: Western Suburbs (2nd spoon)
- Top point-scorer(s): Dally Messenger (71)
- Top try-scorer(s): Arthur McCabe (18)

Second Grade
- Number of teams: 12
- Premiers: Eastern Suburbs
- Runners-up: Newtown

Third Grade
- Number of teams: 16
- Premiers: Sydney
- Runners-up: Rozelle

The 1910 NSWRFL season was the third season of the New South Wales Rugby Football League premiership, Sydney’s top-level rugby league club competition, Australia’s first. Eight teams from across the city contested during the season for the premiership and the Royal Agricultural Society Challenge Shield. During the season, many of the league’s top players took part in matches of the 1910 Great Britain Lions tour of Australia.

== Season summary ==
On 23 July 1910 at the Sydney Showground the South Sydney club defeated Western Suburbs 67–0. This still stands as Souths’ highest ever score and biggest winning margin in a premiership game. It was not beaten in the NSWRFL until 11 May 1935 when St. George defeated Canterbury-Bankstown 91–6, which remains the record score and margin as of 2025.

During the season Annandale’s Ray, Roy, Rex and Bernard Norman became the first set of four brothers to play in the same NSWRFL side.

The League's takings for all matches this year amounted to £13,512, an increase of over £6,000 on the previous season. 1910 was the first season where the NSFWRFL had more people in attendance than Rugby Union.

== Teams ==
With the loss of Cumberland at the end of the 1908 season, the league remained with eight teams; a preferable outcome since no byes would be needed. However by the end of the 1909 season, interest for a local Newcastle competition as well as the difficulties of longer travel for the Newcastle side saw it pull out of the premiership. As a result, a team from Annandale joined the premiership to leave the competition with eight teams. Also this season St. Luke's Park became the Western Suburbs club's home ground.

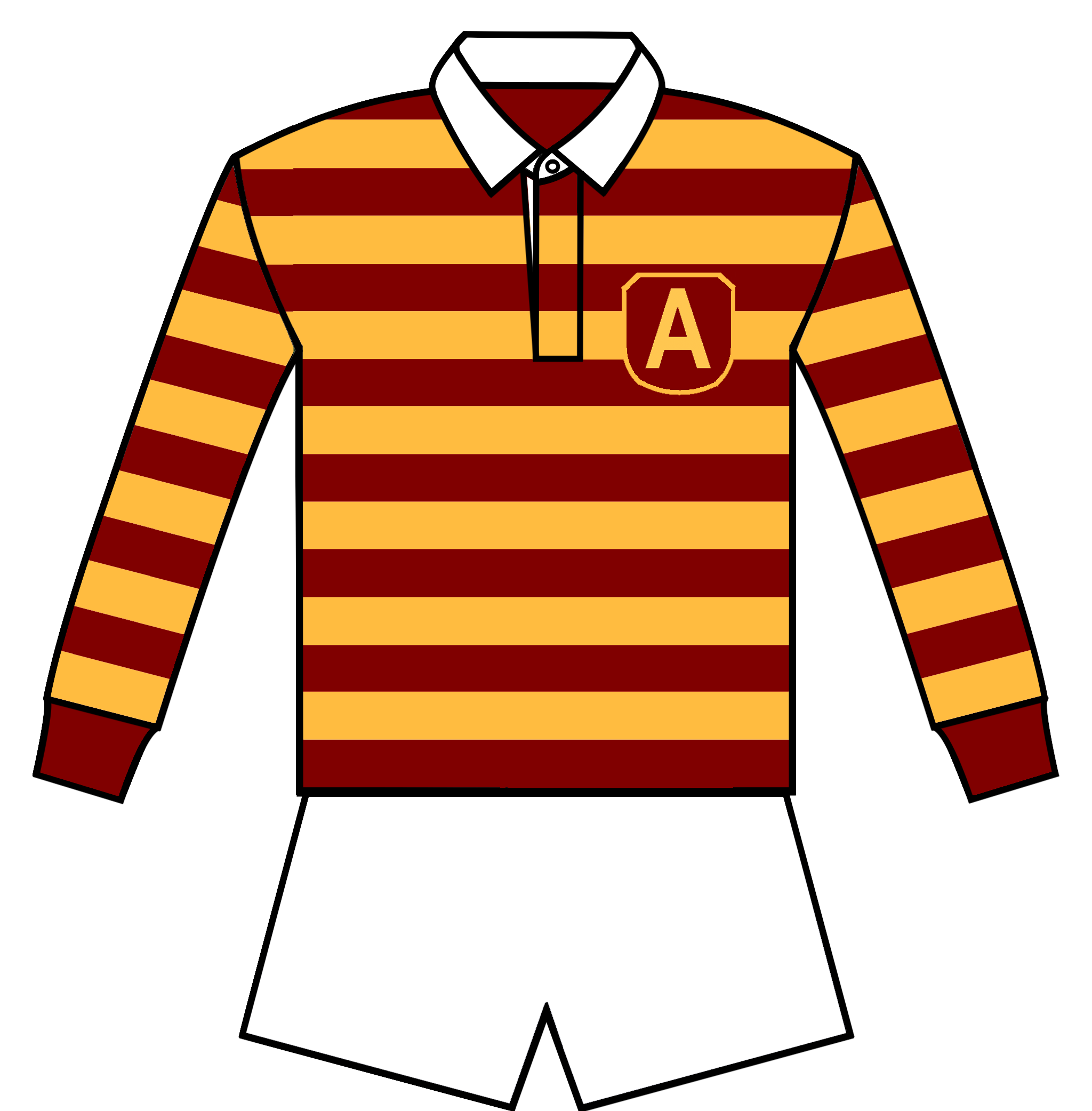
Annandale; 1st season Ground: Wentworth Park; Coach: Captain: George Wilcox

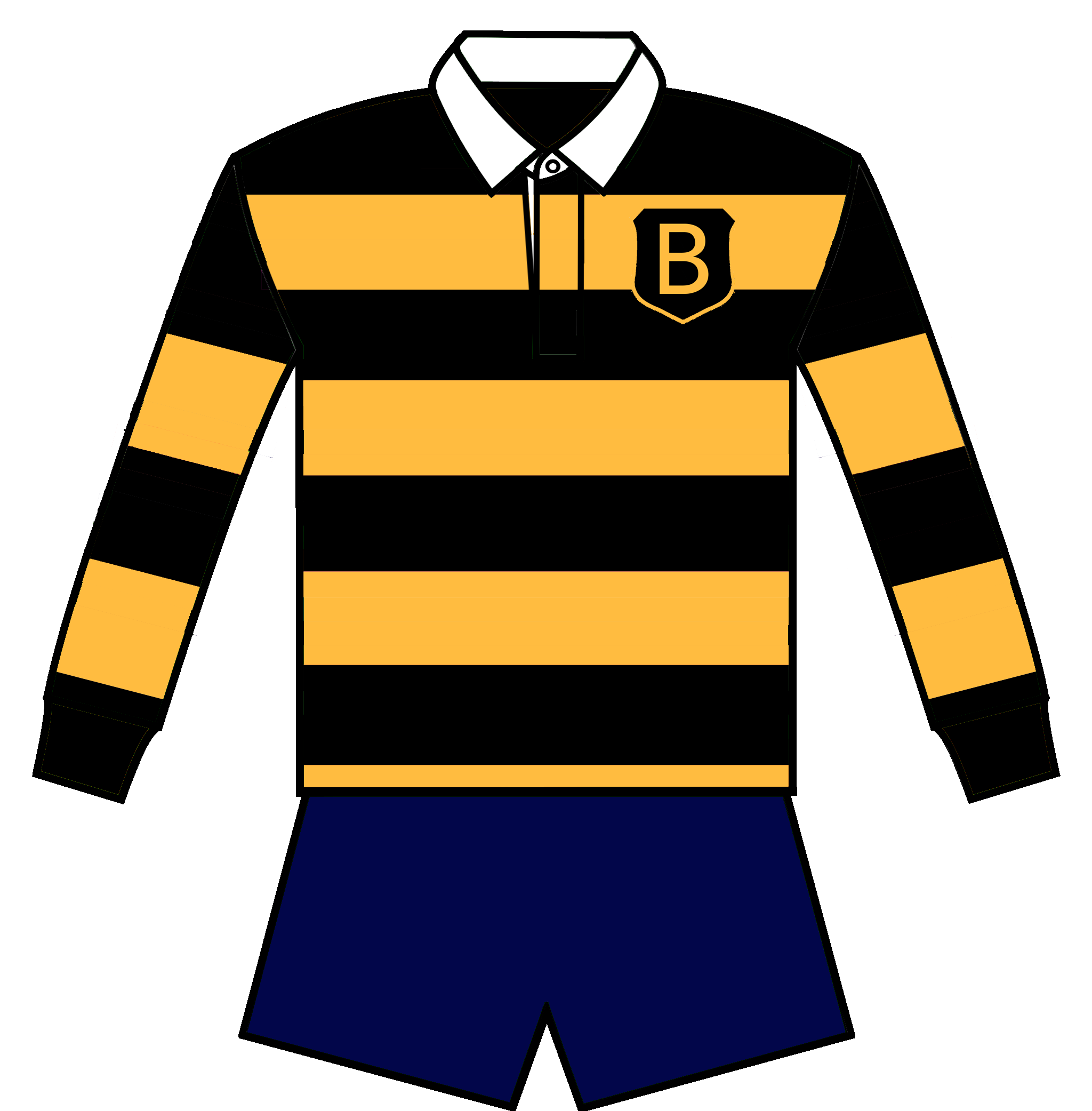
Balmain; 3rd season Ground: Birchgrove Park; Coach: Robert Graves; Captain: Arthur Halloway

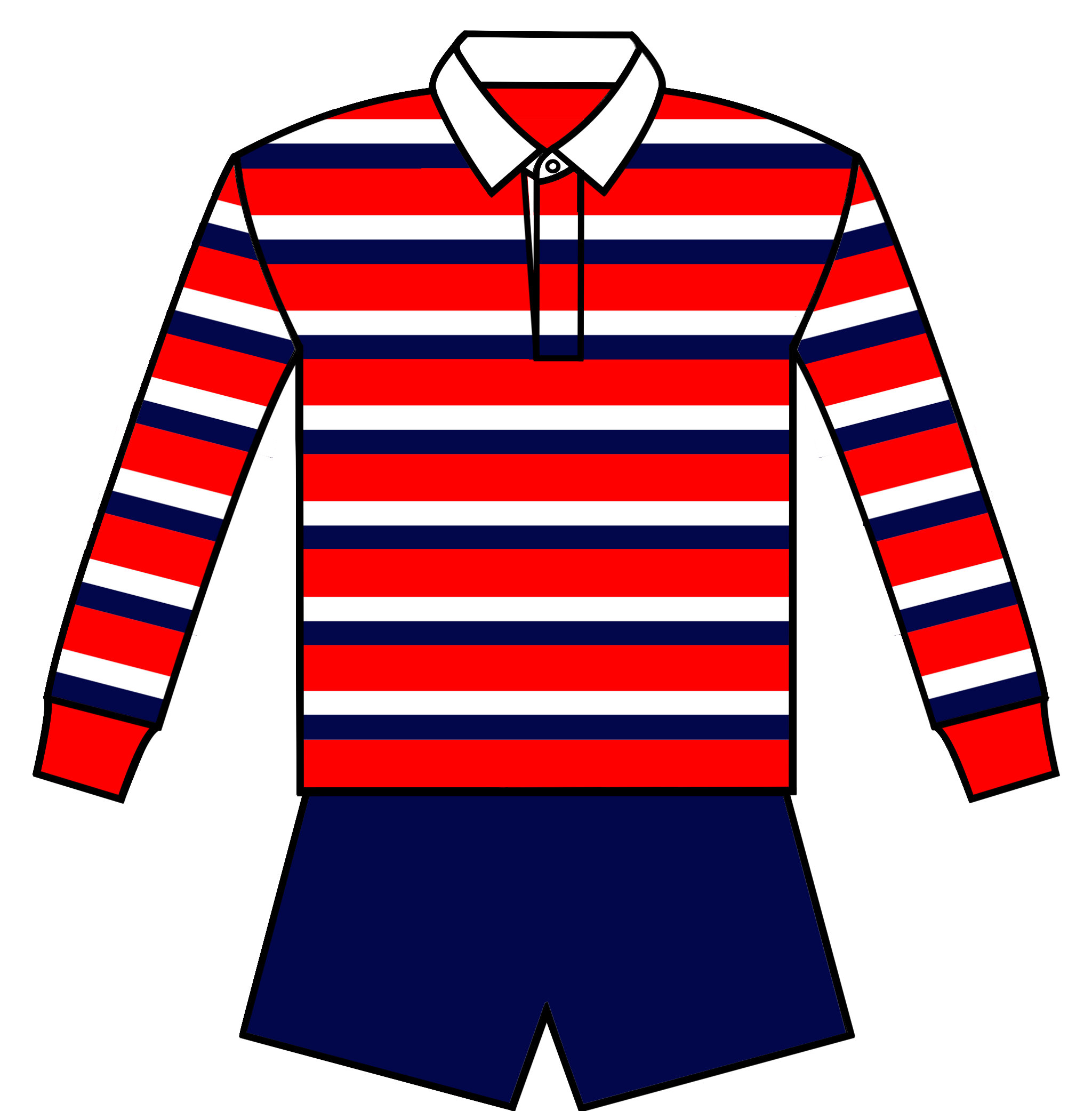
Eastern Suburbs; 3rd season Ground: RAS Showground; Captain- Coach: Dally Messenger

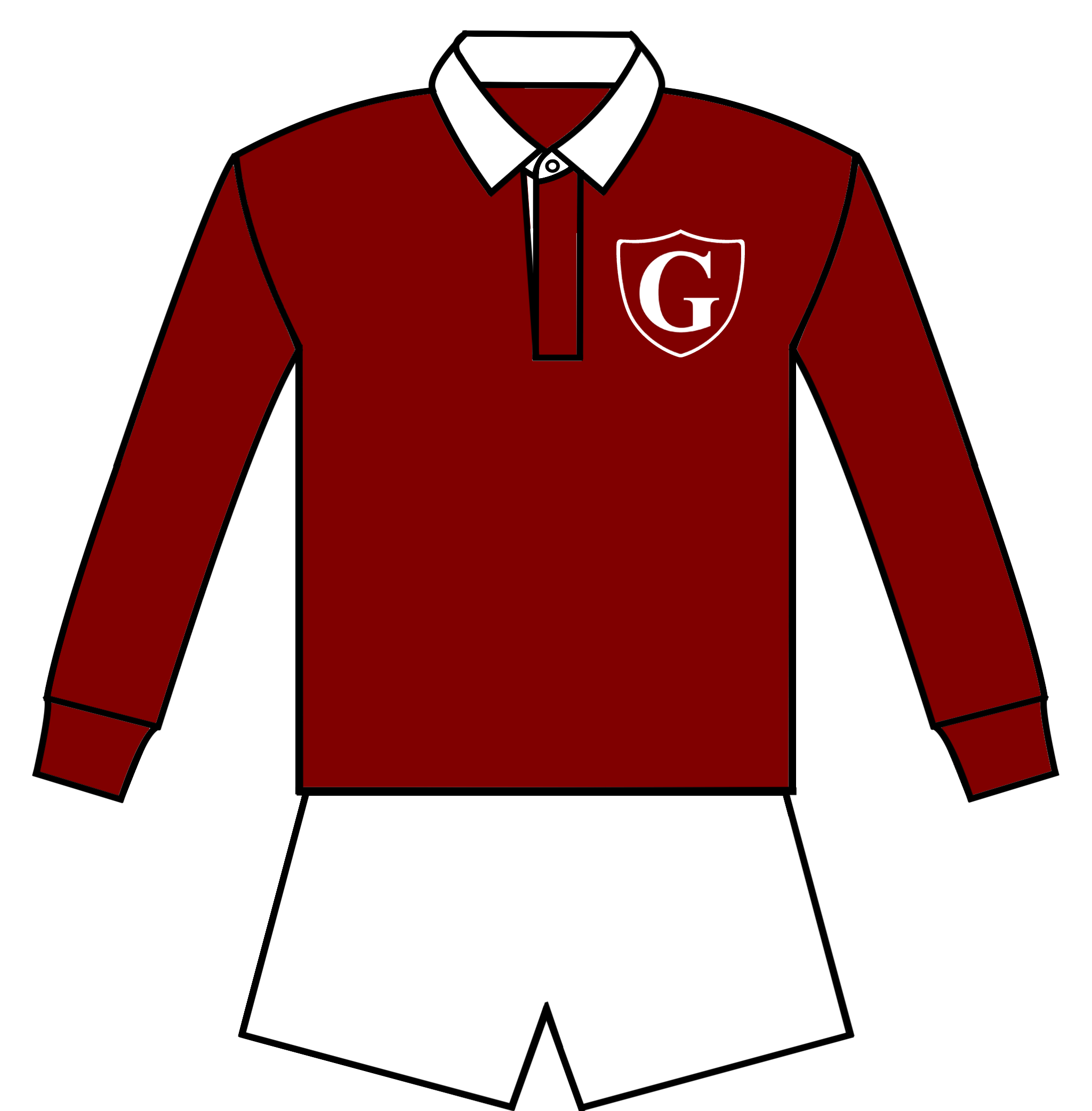
Glebe; 3rd season Ground: Wentworth Park; Coach:Chris McKivat; Captain: Alex Burdon

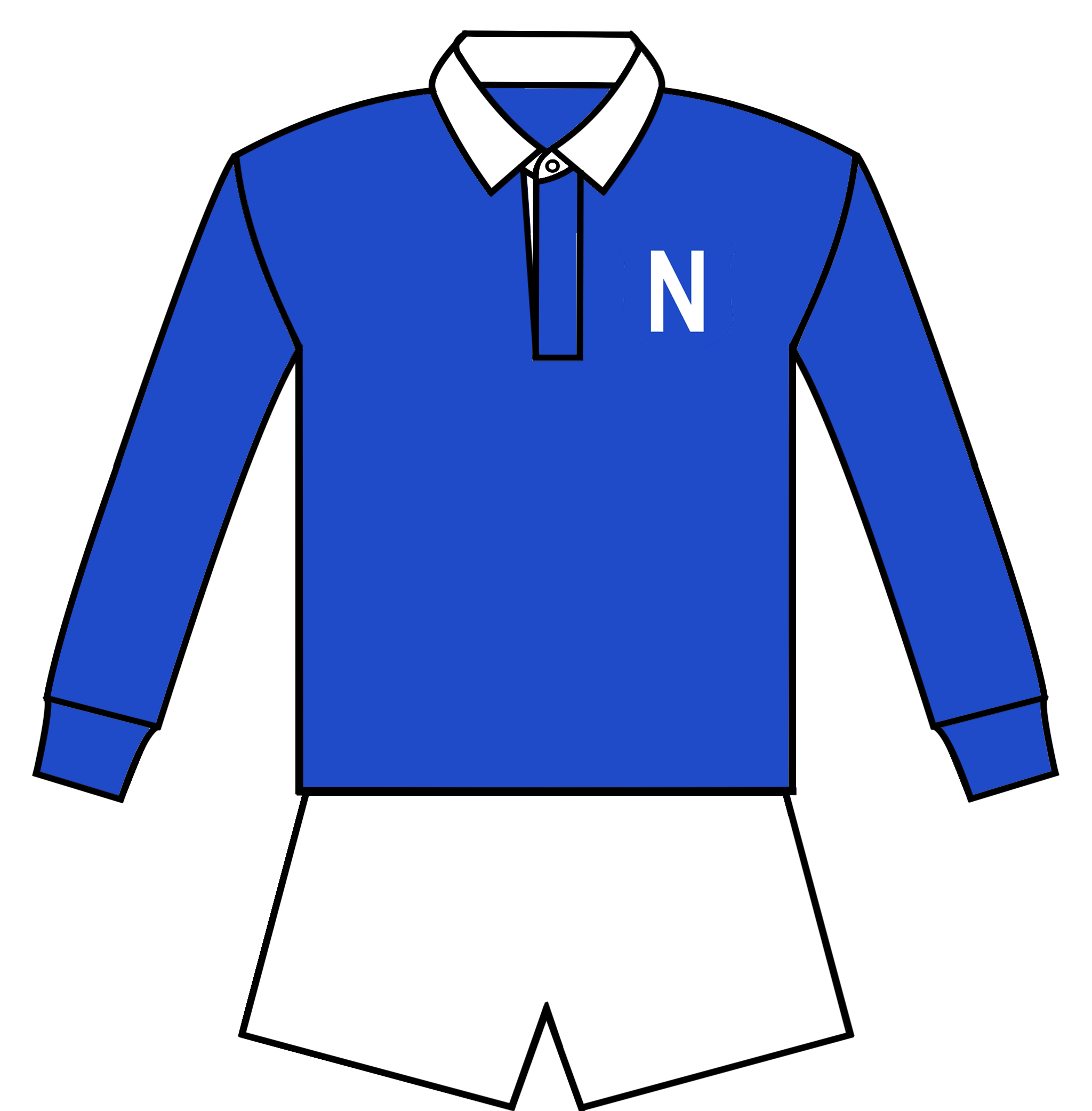
Newtown; 3rd season Ground: Erskineville Metters Park; Captain-Coach: Charles 'Boxer' Russell

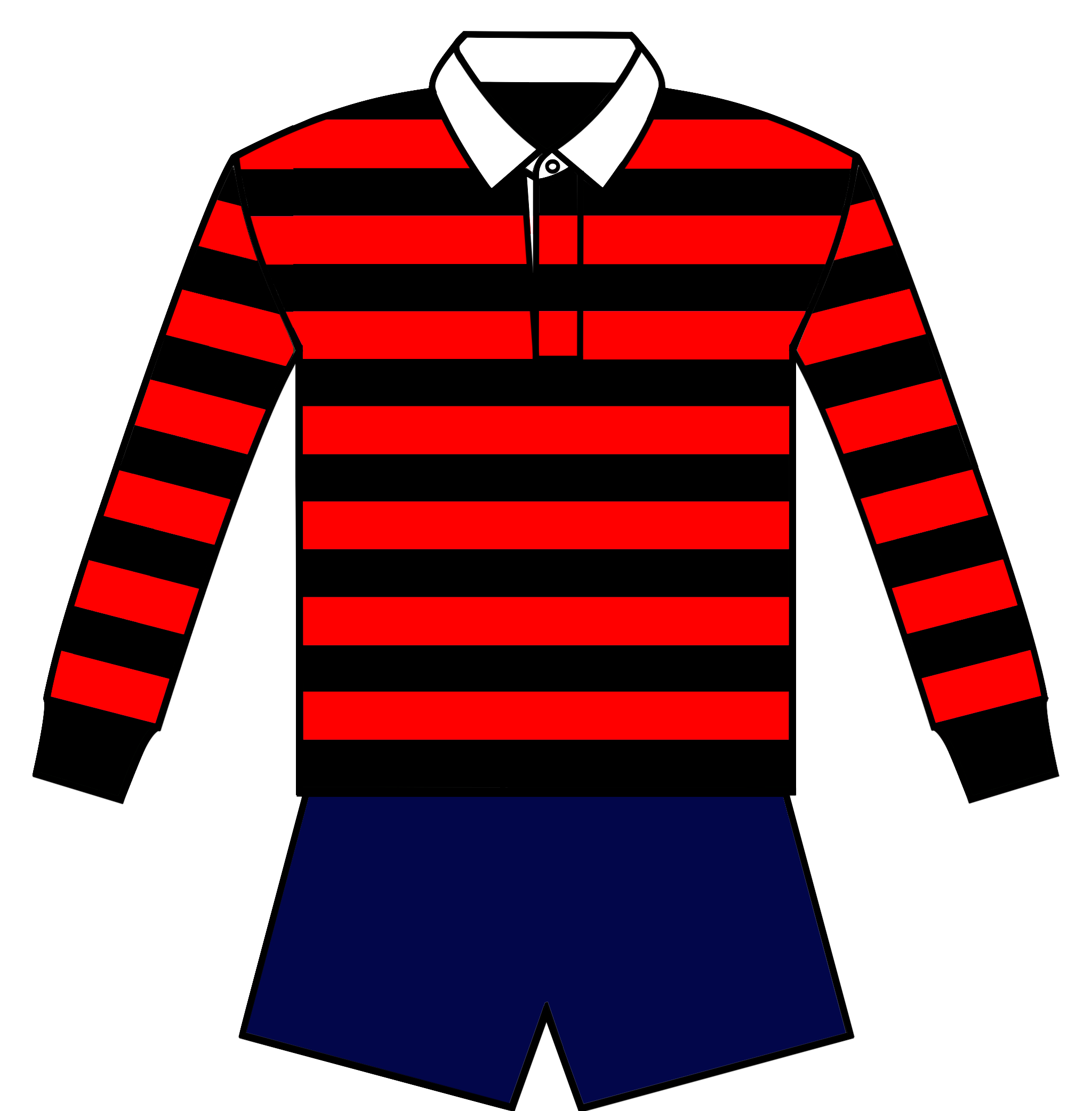
North Sydney; 3rd season Ground: North Sydney Oval; Coach: Captain: Tedda Courtney

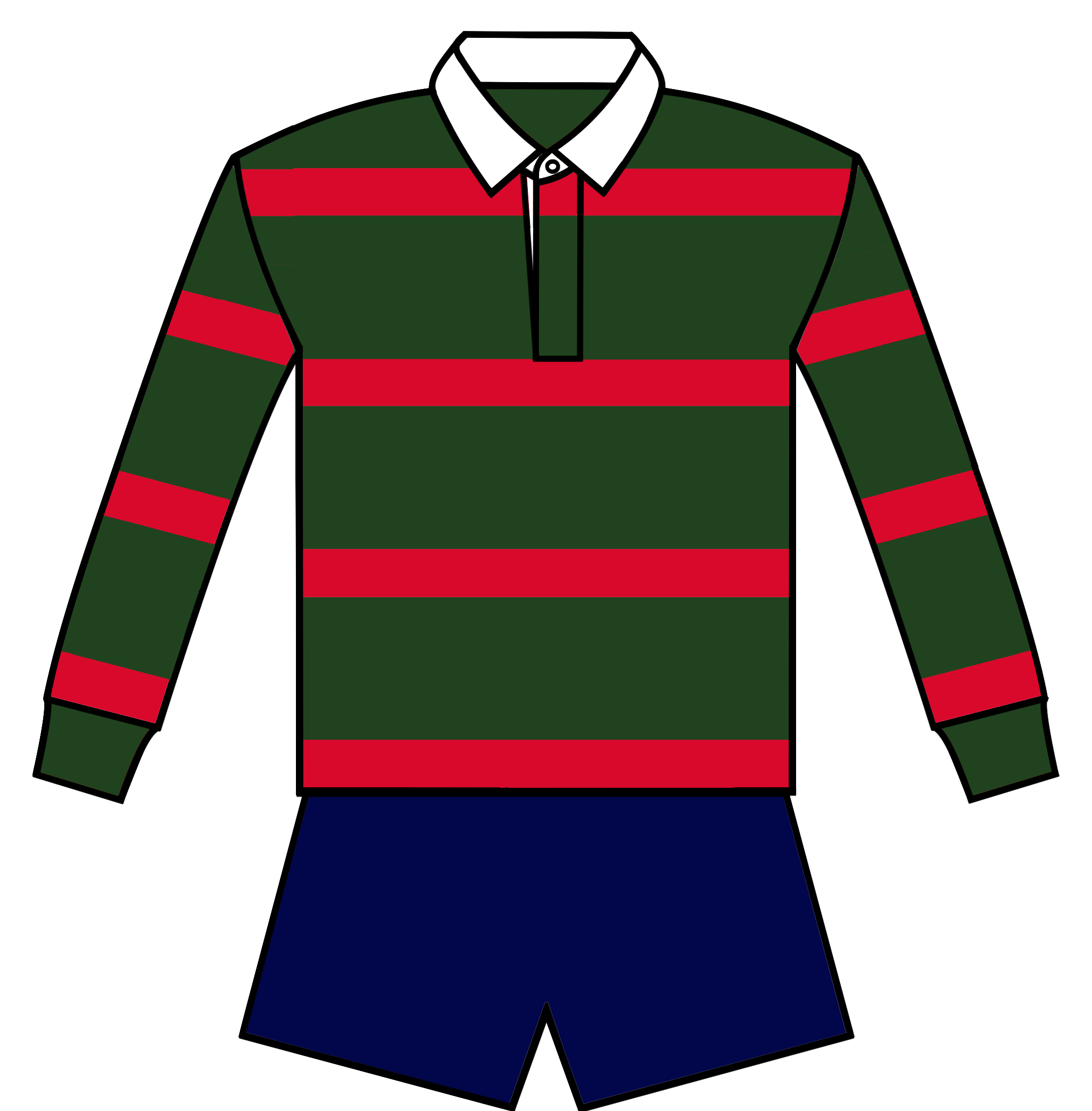
South Sydney; 3rd season Ground: RAS Showground; Captain-Coach: Arthur Hennessy

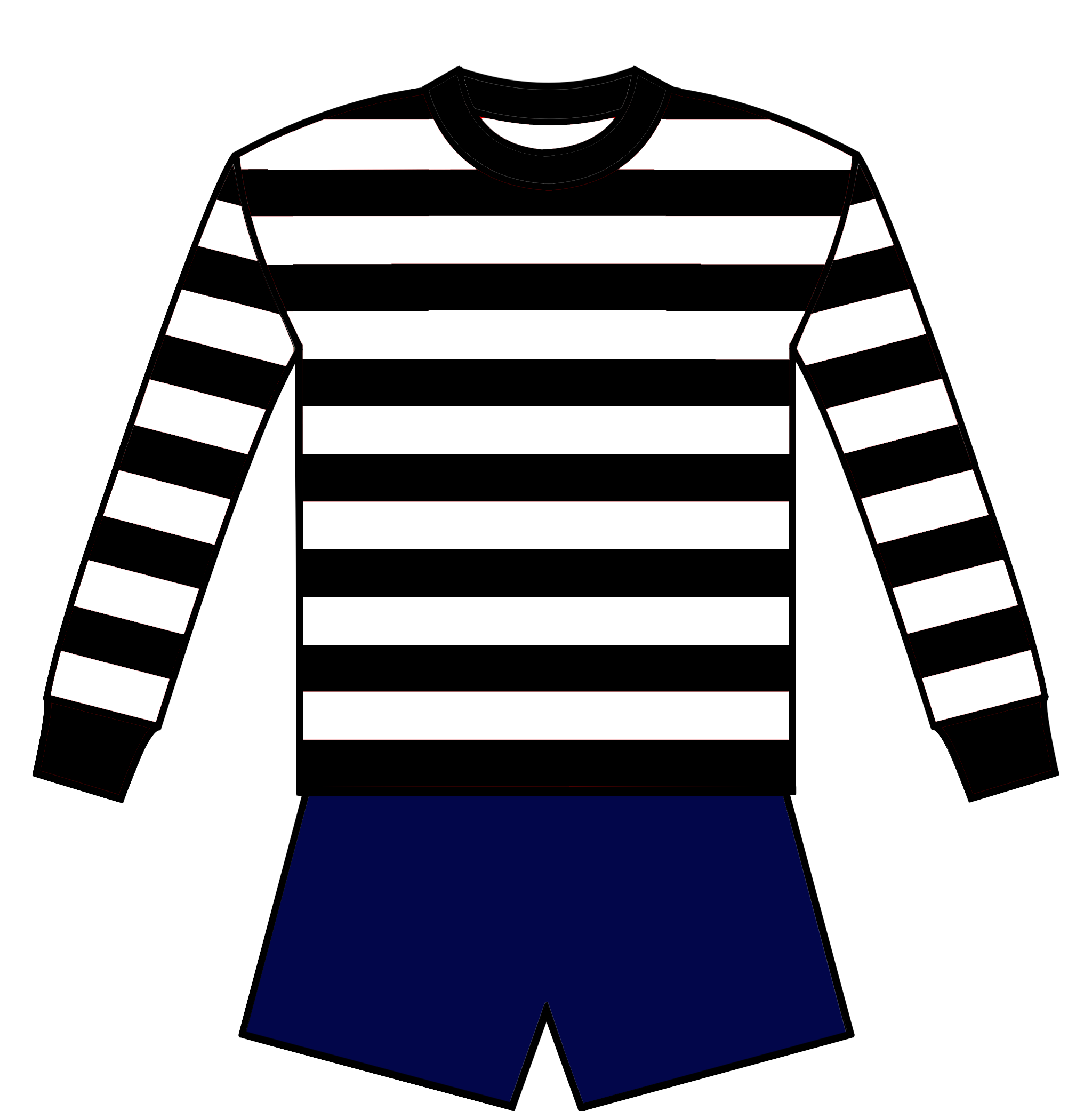
Western Suburbs; 3rd season Ground: St. Luke's Park; Coach: Captain: Percy Bolt

== Ladder ==
Newtown finished on top of the League's ladder at the end of the regular season.

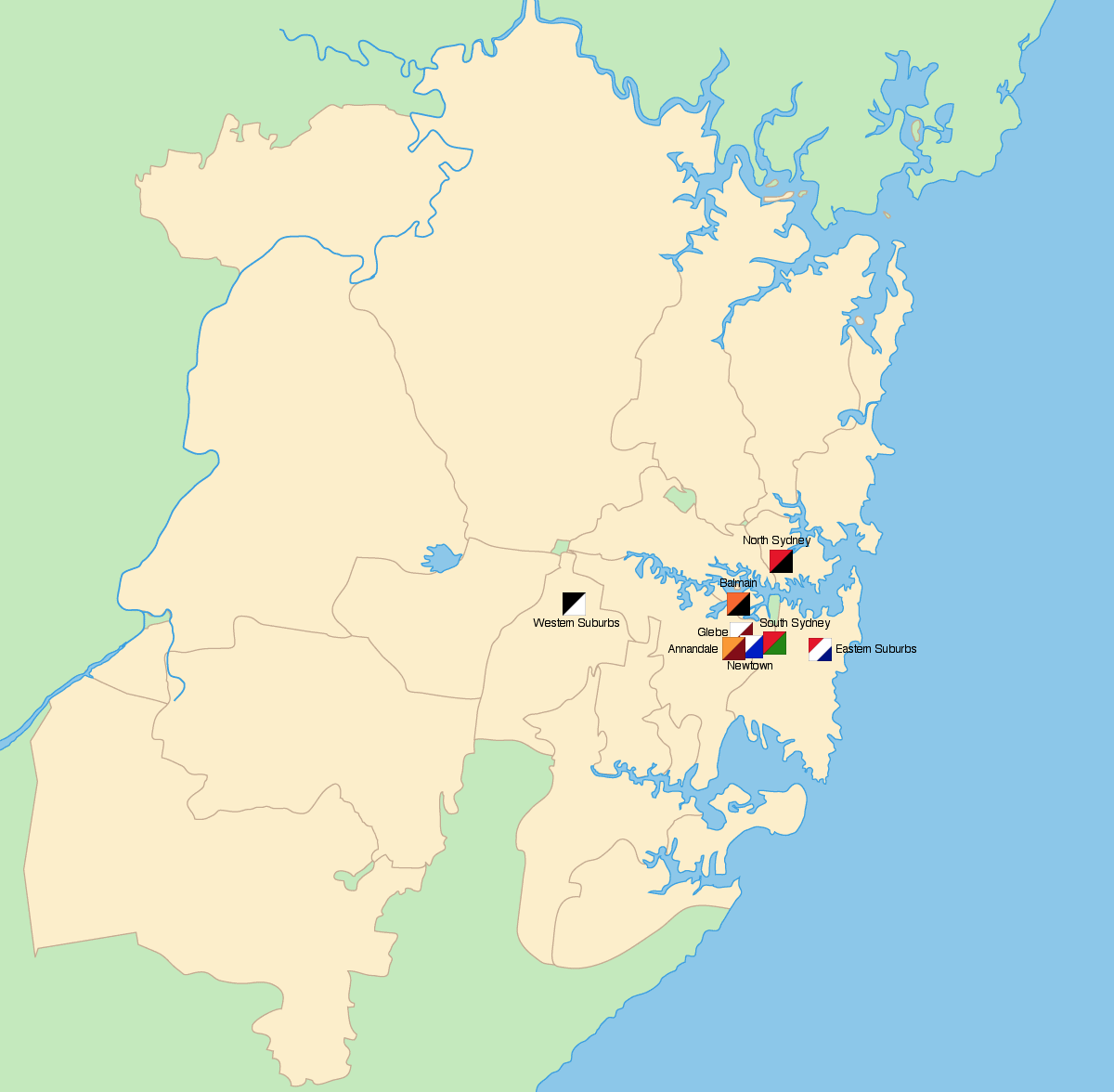
The geographical locations of the teams that contested the 1910 premiership across Sydney.

	Team	Pld	W	D	L	PF	PA	PD	Pts
1	Newtown	14	11	1	2	260	92	+168	23
2	South Sydney	14	11	0	3	326	109	+217	22
3	Eastern Suburbs	14	9	2	3	248	116	+132	20
4	Balmain	14	8	0	6	153	190	-37	16
5	Glebe	14	6	0	8	175	194	-19	12
6	Annandale	14	5	1	8	145	200	-55	11
7	North Sydney	14	3	0	11	146	281	-135	6
8	Western Suburbs	14	1	0	13	115	386	-271	2

=== Ladder progression ===
- Numbers highlighted in green indicate that the team finished the round inside the top 2.
- Numbers highlighted in blue indicates the team finished first on the ladder in that round.
- Numbers highlighted in red indicates the team finished in last place on the ladder in that round

	Team	1	2	3	4	5	6	7	8	9	10	11	12	13	14
1	Newtown	2	4	6	8	8	10	12	14	15	15	17	19	21	23
2	South Sydney	2	4	6	6	6	8	10	12	14	16	18	18	20	22
3	Eastern Suburbs	2	4	4	6	8	8	8	10	11	12	14	16	18	20
4	Balmain	0	2	4	6	6	8	8	10	12	14	14	16	16	16
5	Glebe	0	0	2	4	6	6	8	8	8	10	12	12	12	12
6	Annandale	0	0	0	0	2	4	4	4	6	7	7	9	11	11
7	North Sydney	2	2	2	2	4	4	4	4	4	4	4	4	4	6
8	Western Suburbs	0	0	0	0	0	0	2	2	2	2	2	2	2	2

== Final ==
Newtown	Position	South Sydney
William "Webby" Neill	FB	Frank Twiss
Charles Russell (Ca./Co.)	WG	Tommy Anderson
Viv Farnsworth	CE	Howard Hallett
Albert Hawkes	CE	Jack Leveson
Fred Munnery	WG	Arthur Conlin
Bill Farnsworth	FE	Arthur McCabe
William Hayes	HB	Arthur Butler
James Mogan	PR	Bill Spence
John Chevall	HK	Jim "Barra" Davis
David Grundie	PR	Ernie Hucker
Jack Barnett	SR	Harry Butler
Patrick McCue	SR	Johnny Rosewell
Joe Murray	LK	Arthur Hennessy (Ca./Co.)

Unlike the previous two seasons where a play-off system was used to decide the premier, there was only one game played in 1910. The top two teams, Newtown and South Sydney, played off in a memorable match in front of around 15,000 people at the RAS Showground. Leading 4–2 with reportedly only seconds to go, South Sydney seemed set to take out their third straight premiership. However, after Souths player Howard Hallett was forced to kick the ball clear from his own line, Newtown centre Albert Hawkes caught the ball on the full just metres away from halfway and the touch line. The rules at the time allowed Hawkes to claim a "fair mark" and Newtown to have a shot at goal. Newtown captain Charles "Boxer" Russell was successful in kicking the goal from a difficult position, allowing Newtown to tie the game and win the competition as they had been minor premiers.

Neither team scored a try in the final, although both teams had opportunities to cross the try line recalled by the referee. Additionally multiple attempts at goal were missed by both teams.

=== Scoreboard ===
1910 NSWRFL Final

Saturday, 17 September
15:30 AEST (UTC+10)

Newtown	4 – 4	South Sydney
Goals: 1 Russell (1/2); Hayes (0/1); Goals from mark: 1 Russell (1/1)	1st: 4–0; 2nd: 0–4; Report	Goals: 2 Davis (2/3); Sent off: Davis; Goals from mark: 0 Conlin (0/1)

RAS Showground, Sydney
Attendance: ≈15,000
Referee: Bill Finegan

Howard Hallett

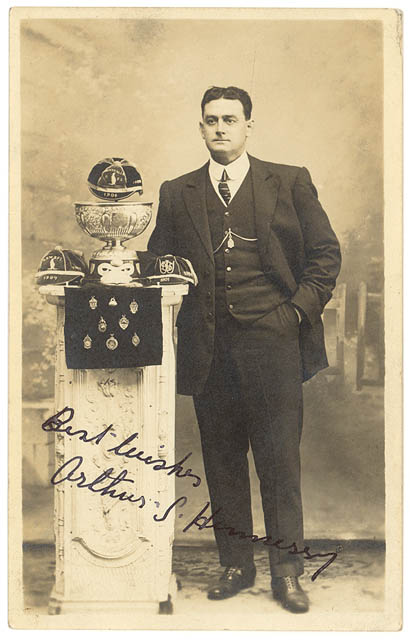
Arthur Hennessy

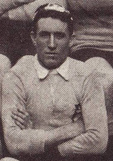
Webby Neill

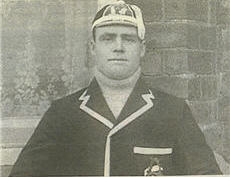
Charles Russell

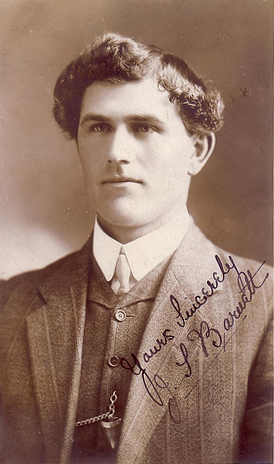
Jack Barnett
