= Jack Leveson =

Australia international rugby league footballer

Personal information
- Full name: John Leveson
- Born: 31 December 1882; Sydney, New South Wales, Australia
- Died: 30 April 1949 (aged 66); Sydney, New South Wales, Australia

Playing information
- Position: Halfback, Five-eighth, Centre, Wing
Club
| Years | Team | Pld | T | G | FG | P |
|---|---|---|---|---|---|---|
| 1908–11 | South Sydney | 45 | 10 | 2 | 0 | 34 |
Representative
| Years | Team | Pld | T | G | FG | P |
| 1909 | Australia | 1 | 0 | 0 | 0 | 0 |
| 1908–10 | New South Wales | 5 | 1 | 0 | 0 | 3 |
| 1908–09 | Metropolis | 3 | 2 | 0 | 0 | 6 |

Jack Leveson (1882-1949) was an Australian rugby league footballer who played in the 1900s and 1910s. He played for South Sydney in the New South Wales Rugby League (NSWRL) competition. Leveson was a foundation player for South Sydney playing in the club's first ever game.

== Playing career ==
Leveson made his first grade debut for Souths against North Sydney at Birchgrove Oval in Round 1 1908 which was the opening week of the NSWRL competition in Australia. Souths won the match 11-7 with Leveson playing at halfback.

Souths went on to claim the inaugural minor premiership in 1908 and reach the first NSWRL grand final against rivals Eastern Suburbs. Leveson played at halfback as Souths claimed their first premiership winning 14-12 at the Royal Agricultural Society Grounds in front of 4000 spectators.

In 1909, Leveson played 10 times for the club as Souths claimed their second premiership in a row against Balmain in controversial circumstances. Balmain were furious that the 1909 NSWRL grand final was to be played as the under card to the Wallabies v Kangaroos match.

Balmain were seemingly aggrieved at the demotion of importance of the Final, and asked the NSWRL to ensure it was played on a separate day. They also argued that their players labour should not go towards paying money owed to Joynton-Smith and the NSWRL. The League refused and Balmain announced that they would not play.

On the day of the Final the Balmain players arrived outside the ground in the early afternoon, well before the scheduled kick-off time of 2 o’clock. They then picketed the entrance, endeavouring to convince patrons not to enter.

Despite very heavy rain and the protests of the Balmain footballers, enough of a crowd turned up to clear the debts of Joynton-Smith and the NSWRL. Balmain stuck to their word and did not appear on the field. Souths kicked off, picked up the ball and scored a try. The referee awarded them the match, and with it the 1909 premiership.

In 1910, Leveson played in his third grand final as Souths reached the decider against Newtown. In the dying minutes of the game Souths led 4-2 until Howard Hallett kicked the ball from the near the Souths goal line.

Newtown player Albert Hawkes caught the ball on the full near the halfway line and on the touch line. The rules allowed Newtown to claim a fair mark which meant they had the chance to tie the game with a shot at goal. Newtown converted the penalty drawing the game but since they had finished first on the table during the regular season, they were declared premiership winners.

Leveson played with South Sydney up until the end of the 1913 before retiring. At representative level, Leveson played for Australia in 1909, New South Wales between 1908-1910 and Metropolis between 1908 and 1909.
