= Ken Wilson (rugby league) =

Australian rugby league footballer (1952–2022)

Personal information
- Born: 24 November 1952 Sydney, New South Wales, Australia
- Died: 22 December 2022 (aged 70) Australia

Playing information
- Position: Five-eighth, Halfback
Club
Years	Team	Pld	T	G	FG	P
1971–74, 1979–83	Newtown	150	25	447	28	1001
1976–78	Penrith Panthers	44	7	117	5	260
	Total	194	32	564	33	1261

Ken Wilson (24 November 1952 – 22 December 2022), nicknamed Squeaker, was an Australian rugby league footballer who played in the 1970s and 1980s.

== Career ==
Wilson was a skillful halfback or five-eighth, despite lacking pace, but is best remembered as one of rugby league's greatest goal kickers.

Wilson came from an Australian Rules background to be graded by the Newtown club in 1970, and played four seasons with Newtown between 1970 and 1974. Ken was a product of the Marrickville De La Salle College and the Addison Royals (Marrickville) junior rugby league club.

Wilson only gradually established in first grade – in a famous match he was the point-scorer with a field goal for the only 1–0 scoreline (against St. George in 1973) – thirteen seconds after coming onto the field. In 1976 Wilson moved to the Penrith Panthers for three seasons. He returned to Newtown in 1979 and stayed with them until the club folded at the end of 1983, being their captain during the final two seasons. Wilson played in Newtown's final ever game in the top grade which was against the Canberra Raiders which Newtown won 9–6 at Campbelltown Stadium. Wilson missed three kicks at goal during the game but kicked a field goal.

Wilson set many point scoring records with both Newtown and Penrith. He ranks first among Newtown's all-time point scorers, with 1001 points.

Wilson came on as a replacement in the 1981 Grand Final, and later coached reserve grade at Canterbury-Bankstown and the Ryde-Eastwood club.

With 150 appearances, he is ranked fifth on Newtown's list of most appearances behind Frank Farrell (204), Brian Moore (173), Bobby Whitton (171), and Bobby Keyes (163).
