= Christian Brothers' High School, Lewisham =

School in New South Wales, Australia

Location
- Lewisham, Inner West, Sydney; Australia; 33°53′50″S 151°8′43″E

Information
- Other name: CBHS Lewisham
- Type: Private comprehensive single-sex secondary day school
- Motto: Latin: Conanti Corona (A crown to the one who strives)
- Religious affiliation: Christian Brothers
- Denomination: Roman Catholic
- Established: 1891; 135 years ago
- Principal: Michael Blowes
- Staff: ~120
- Years: 5–12
- Gender: Boys
- Enrolment: c. 1,350 (2007)
- Colours: Navy blue, sky blue and gold
- Athletics conference: Metropolitan Catholic Colleges Sports Association
- Affiliation: Junior School Heads Association of Australia
- Website: www.cbhslewisham.nsw.edu.au

Christian Brothers' High School, Lewisham (also known as CBHS Lewisham), is a private Roman Catholic comprehensive single-sex secondary day school for boys, located in Lewisham, an inner-western suburb of Sydney, New South Wales, Australia. Established in 1891 by the Christian Brothers, the school has a non-selective enrolment policy and currently caters for approximately 1,350 boys from Year 5 to Year 12. The school is the oldest of the Christian Brothers schools operating in Sydney.

== Principals ==
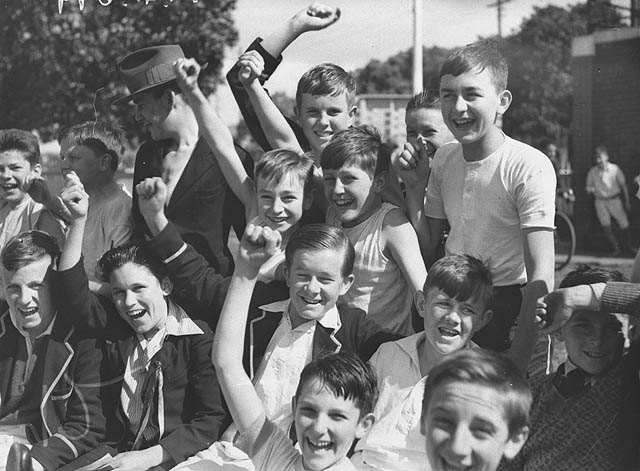
Christian Brothers' High School, Lewisham students, 1934

The following individuals have served as Principal of Christian Brothers' High School, Lewisham:

Ordinal	Officeholder	Term start	Term end	Time in office	Notes
1	L. Murphy	1889	1890	0–1 years	Newtown site
2	B. O’Hagan	1891	1892	0–1 years	
3	P. Nunan	1892	1896	3–4 years	
4	V. Caffrey	1897	1902	4–5 years	
5	B. Coyne	1903	1904	0–1 years	
6	J. T. Quinn	1905	1906	0–1 years	
7	F. Magee	1907	1909	1–2 years	
8	P. Walsh	1909	1910	0–1 years	
−	J. T. Quinn	1910	1912	1–2 years	
9	T. B. Galvin	1913	1915	1–2 years	
10	T. P. Harty	1916	1919	2–3 years	
11	P. S. Mulkerns	1920	1922	1–2 years	
12	J. A. Kearney	1923	1924	0–1 years	
13	J. A. Fitzgerald	1925	1925	0 years	
14	M. E. Breen	1926	1931	4–5 years	
15	J. M. Wynne	1932	1937	4–5 years	
16	J. S. Turpin	1938	1943	4–5 years	
17	K. B. O’Farrell	1944	1946	1–2 years	
18	J. K. O’Neill	1947	1952	4–5 years	
19	R. B. Healy	1953	1958	4–5 years	
20	V. A. Doody	1959	1961	1–2 years	
21	W. V. Green	1962	1966	3–4 years	
22	M. B. Gallagher	1967	1967	0 years	
23	M. L. Hanlon	1968	1972	3–4 years	
24	M. Q. Brady	1973	1982	8–9 years	
25	F. R. Pelin	1983	1988	4–5 years	
26	P. A. Hester	1989	2000	10–11 years	
27	B. Roberts	2001	2007	5–6 years	
28	P. Conn	2008	2020	12-13 years	
29	M. Blowes	2021	incumbent	4–5 years	

== Crest and motto ==
The school motto Conanti Corona, translates as "A crown to the one who strives", which is used as an expression to help students to try their best in all aspects of life. The school crest is adapted from the Christian Brothers’ crest, highlighting the Celtic Cross and the Irish heritage of the Christian Brothers. The crest also contains the two symbols for the first and last letters of the Latin alphabet, symbolising learning and knowledge.

== Notable alumni ==
Alumni of Christian Brothers' High School, Lewisham are traditionally known as the "Old Boys".

=== Arts and letters ===
- Ron Blair, playwright
- Gordon Elliott, journalist and producer
- Leo Schofield AM, journalist and food critic
- Greg Sheridan AO, journalist
- Francis Webb, poet
- David Wenham AM, actor

=== Medicine and science ===
- Victor Chang AC, heart surgeon

=== Military ===
- Jack Mackey VC (1936), military man given the Commonwealth's highest honour for bravery

=== Politics, public service and the law ===
- The Hon John Aquilina AM, politician, a former Speaker of the NSW Legislative Assembly, and a former Minister for Education and Member for Blacktown and Riverstone;
- George Brandis QC, former Attorney-General of Australia and Leader of the Government in the Senate
- Steve Doszpot ASM, politician, and Member of the ACT Legislative Assembly
- Brian McGowan, politician, a member of the New South Wales Legislative Assembly
- Sir Edward McTiernan Judge of High Court of Australia
- Justice Kevin Frederick O'Leary QC, the Chief Justice of the Supreme Court of the Northern Territory;
- The Hon Terry Sheahan AO, a former NSW Attorney General and Member for Burrinjuck.
- The Hon Harry Woods, Member Federal House of Representatives, Member NSW Legislative Assembly, Minister Local Government, Regional development, Rural Affairs.

=== Sport ===
- Paul Akkary, Newtown Jets rugby league player
- Raphael Bove, footballer
- Jeremy Bray, an Irish cricketer
- Steve Gearin, rugby league footballer
- Roger Hartigan, Test cricket player
- Solomon Haumono, rugby league footballer and professional boxer
- Brett Holman, footballer
- Andrew Koczka, footballer
- Andrew Lomu, rugby league footballer
- Martin Mulligan, tennis player
- Paul Osborne, a professional rugby league footballer; politician, Schoolboy Player of the Year Award 1984
- Kurtis Patterson, test cricket player.
- Nathan Peats, former rugby league footballer for the Gold Coast Titans
- Tim Pickup, rugby league footballer and test representative.
- Joe Reaiche, rugby league footballer
- Shane Rigon, rugby league footballer
- Michael Speechley, rugby league footballer
- Greg Stafford, an AFL player for Sydney Swans and Richmond Tigers
- Marco Tilio, footballer for Celtic and the Australian national team
- Bailey Hayward, rugby league footballer for Bulldogs

== See also ==
- List of Catholic schools in New South Wales
- Catholic education in Australia
