= Michael Howell =

Michael or Mick Howell may refer to:

- Michael Howell (rugby league) (born 1982), Australian rugby league player
- Mick Howell (Australian footballer) (1946–1985), Australian football player
- Mick Howell (referee), Australian rugby league referee
- Mike Howell, American football player

== See also ==
- Michael Howells (1957–2018), English designer
