= 1914 NSWRFL season =

Rugby league competition

- League: New South Wales Rugby Football League
- Duration: 2 May to 22 August
- Teams: 8
- Matches played: 56
- Points scored: 1202
- Premiers: South Sydney (3rd title)
- Minor Premiers: South Sydney (3rd title)
- Wooden spoon: Annandale (1st spoon)
- Top point-scorer(s): Harold Horder (87)
- Top try-scorer(s): Harold Horder (19)

Second Grade
- Number of teams: 14
- Premiers: South Sydney
- Runners-up: Eastern Suburbs

Third Grade
- Number of teams: 16
- Premiers: Eastern Suburbs
- Runners-up: South Sydney Kinkora

The 1914 New South Wales Rugby Football League premiership was the seventh season of Sydney's top-grade rugby league football club competition, Australia's first. Eight teams from across the city contested during the season. The 1914 season's gate receipts totalled £24,072, which was £7,038 more than the previous season's.

== Season summary ==
Following the retirement of Dally Messenger at the end of the 1913 season, Eastern Suburbs’ stranglehold on the premiership came to an end. In their place, previous premiers South Sydney and Newtown took control of the competition. Newtown were in a good position to take out their second premiership midway through the season but a loss to middle-placed Balmain hurt their cause, although Newtown defeated South Sydney the following week. It turned out that the Balmain loss would make the difference, with South Sydney finishing just one point ahead of Newtown at the end of the season to claim their third premiership. No Finals were contested. Members of the South Sydney premiership winning side included Howard Hallett (Player of the Season), Roy Almond, O. Brown, Arthur Butler, Harry Butler, William Cann, Jim Davis, Wally Dymant, E. Hilliard, Owen McCarthy, Arthur McCabe and Harold Horder.

The season was punctuated by matches against the 1914 Great Britain Lions tour of Australia and New Zealand, and was the last for future Australian Rugby League Hall of Fame inductee Chris McKivat who went on to have a prominent coaching career.

=== Teams ===
The teams remained unchanged from the previous season.

- Annandale
- Balmain, formed on 23 January 1908 at Balmain Town Hall
- Eastern Suburbs, formed on 24 January 1908 at Paddington Town Hall
- Glebe, formed on 9 January 1908
- Newtown, formed on 14 January 1908
- North Sydney, formed on February 7, 1908, at the North Sydney School of Arts in Mount Street
- South Sydney, formed on 17 January 1908 at Redfern Town Hall
- Western Suburbs, formed on 4 February 1908

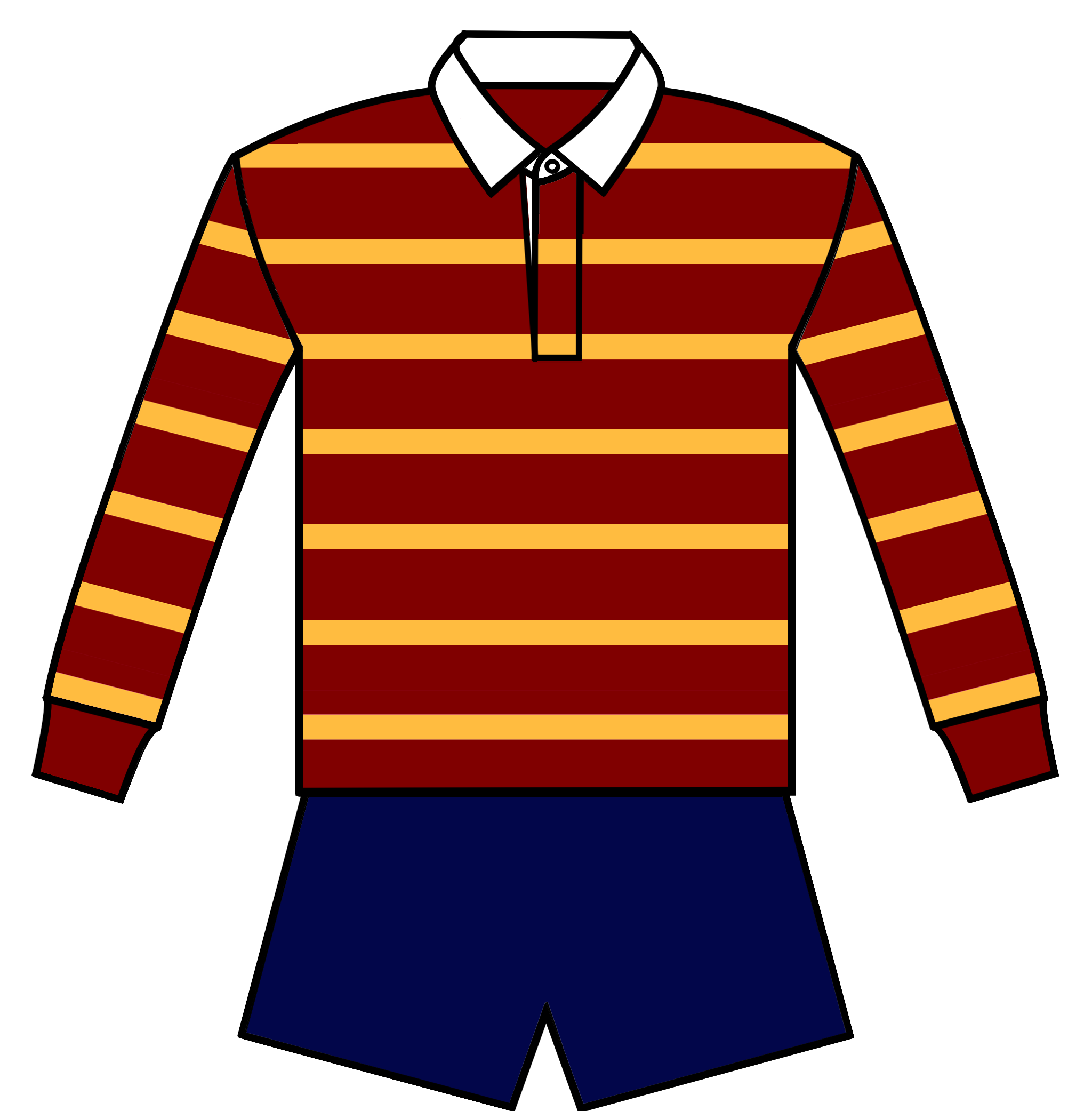
Annandale; Ground: Wentworth Park; Captain :William Lindsay

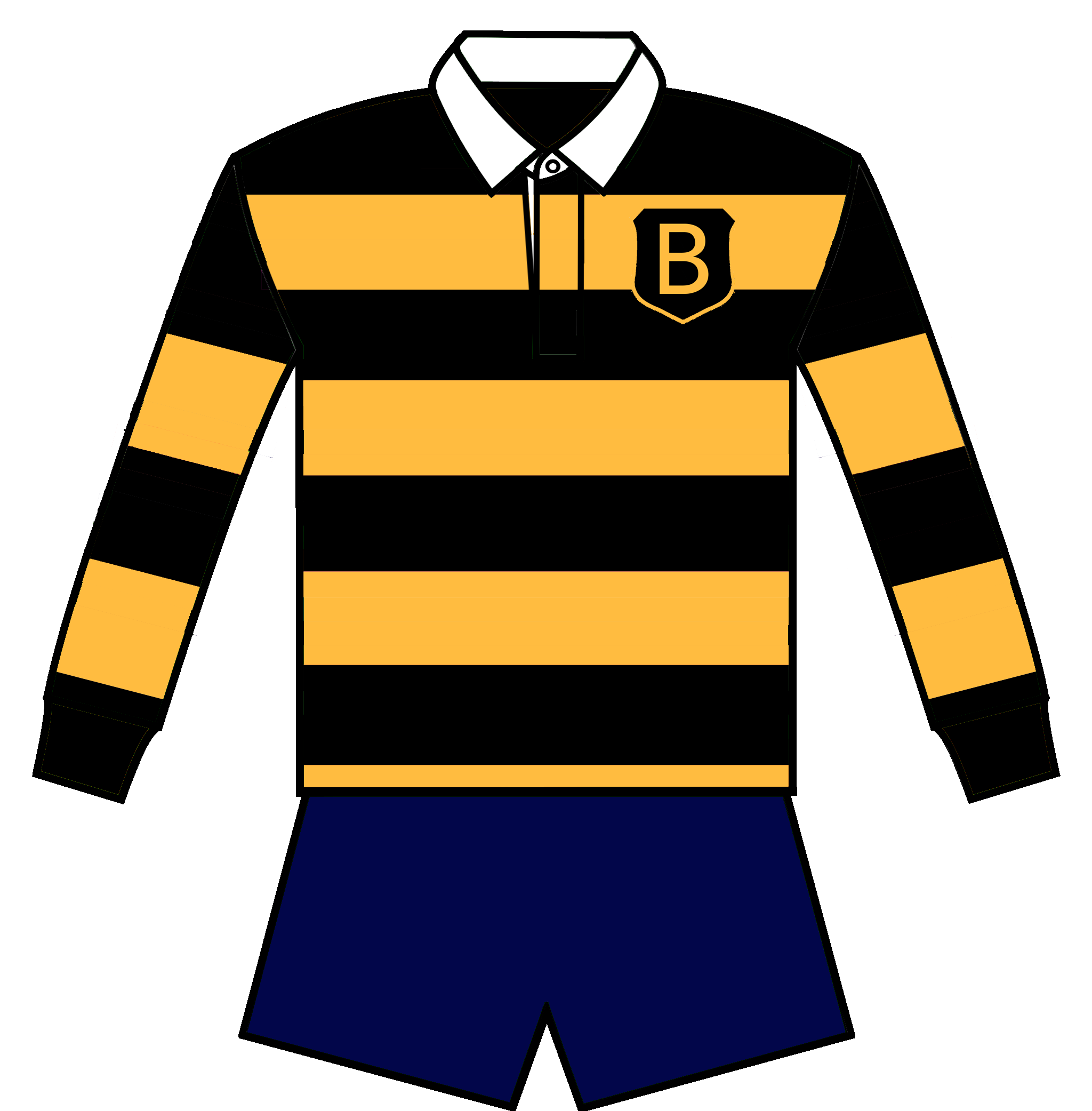
Balmain; Ground: Birchgrove Oval; Coach: Bill Kelly; Captain: Charles Fraser

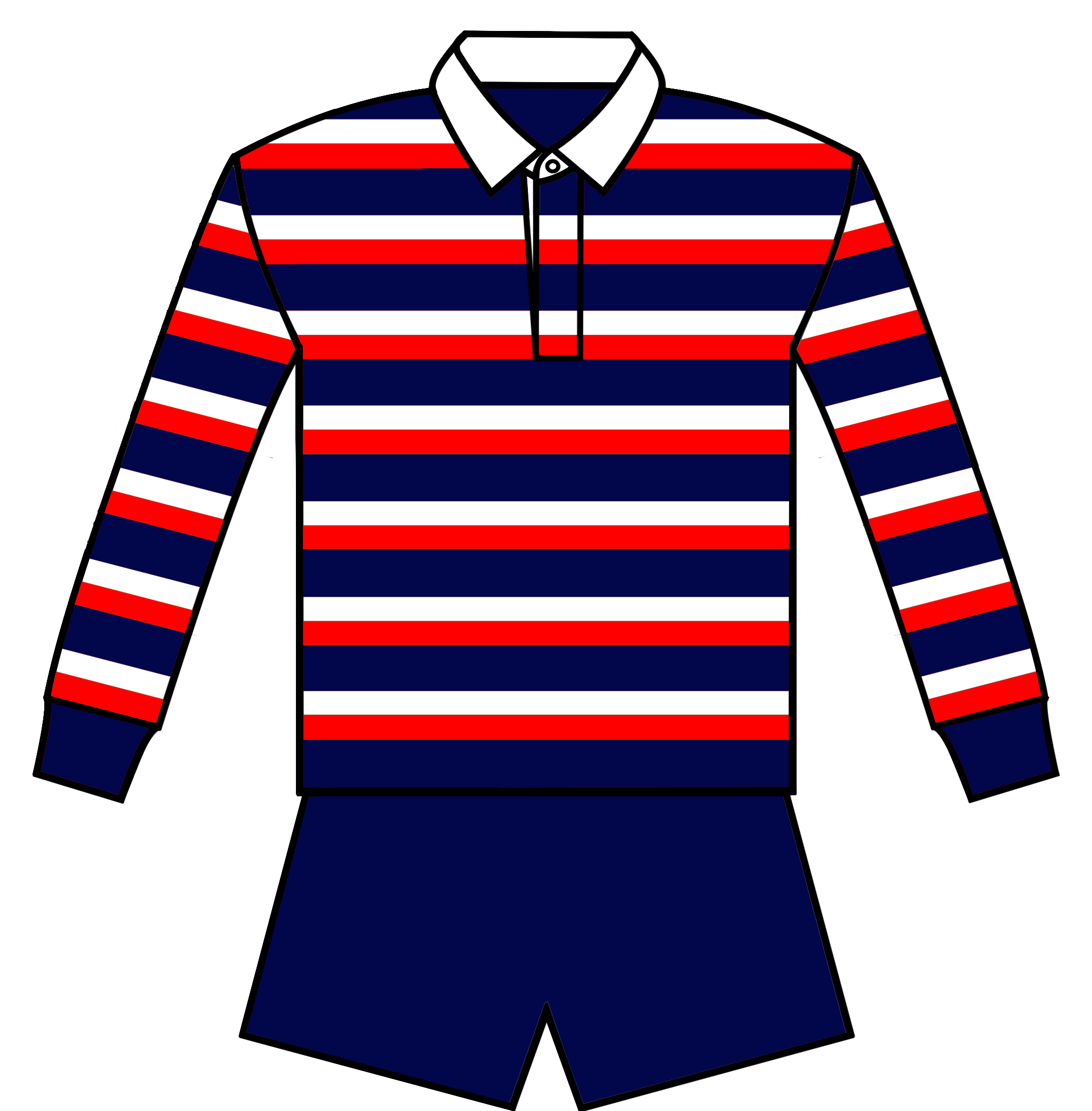
Eastern Suburbs; 7th season Ground: Sydney Sports Ground; Captain: Dan Frawley

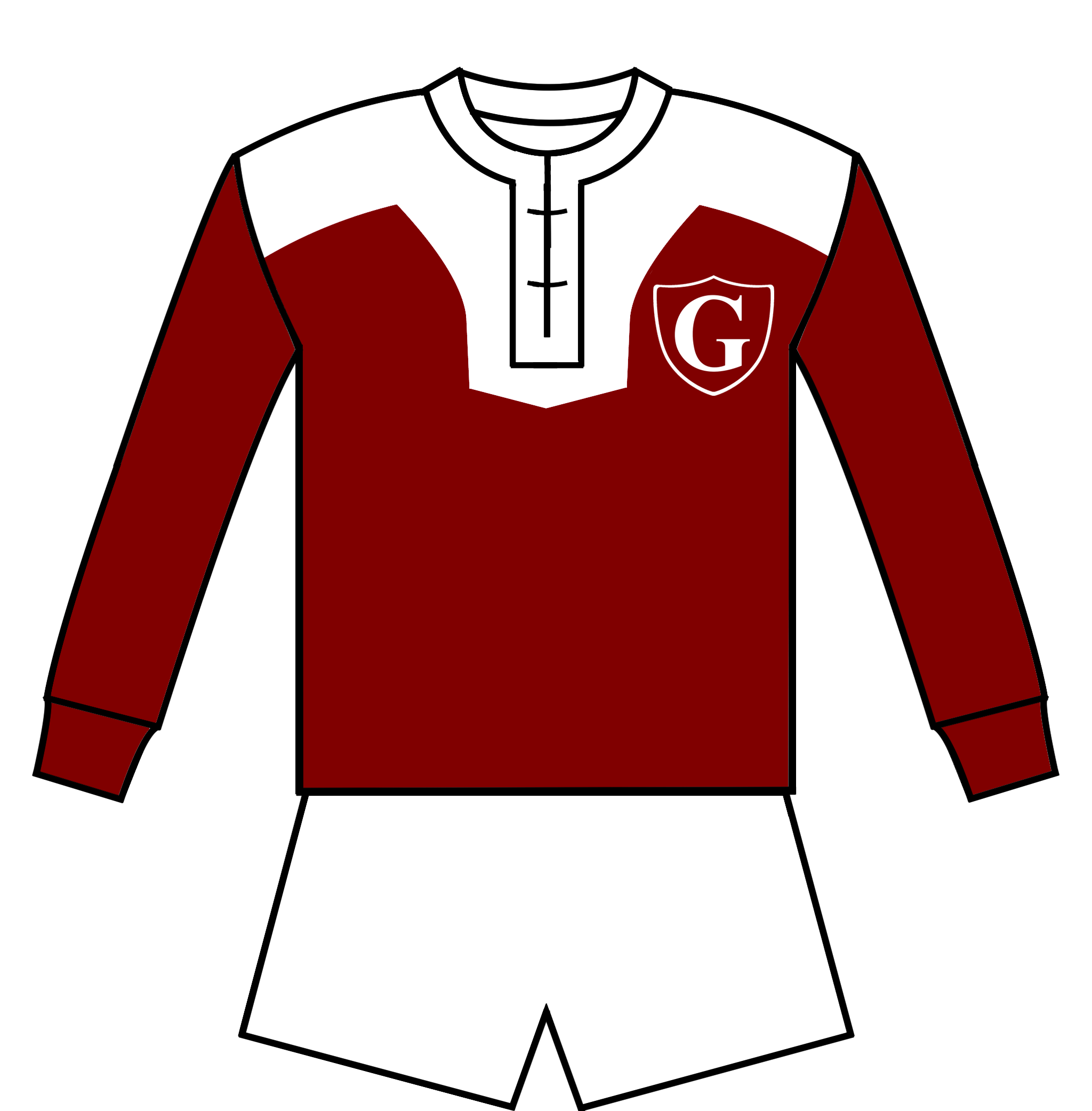
Glebe; Ground: Wentworth Park; Captain-Coach: Chris McKivat; Co-captain: Alby Burge

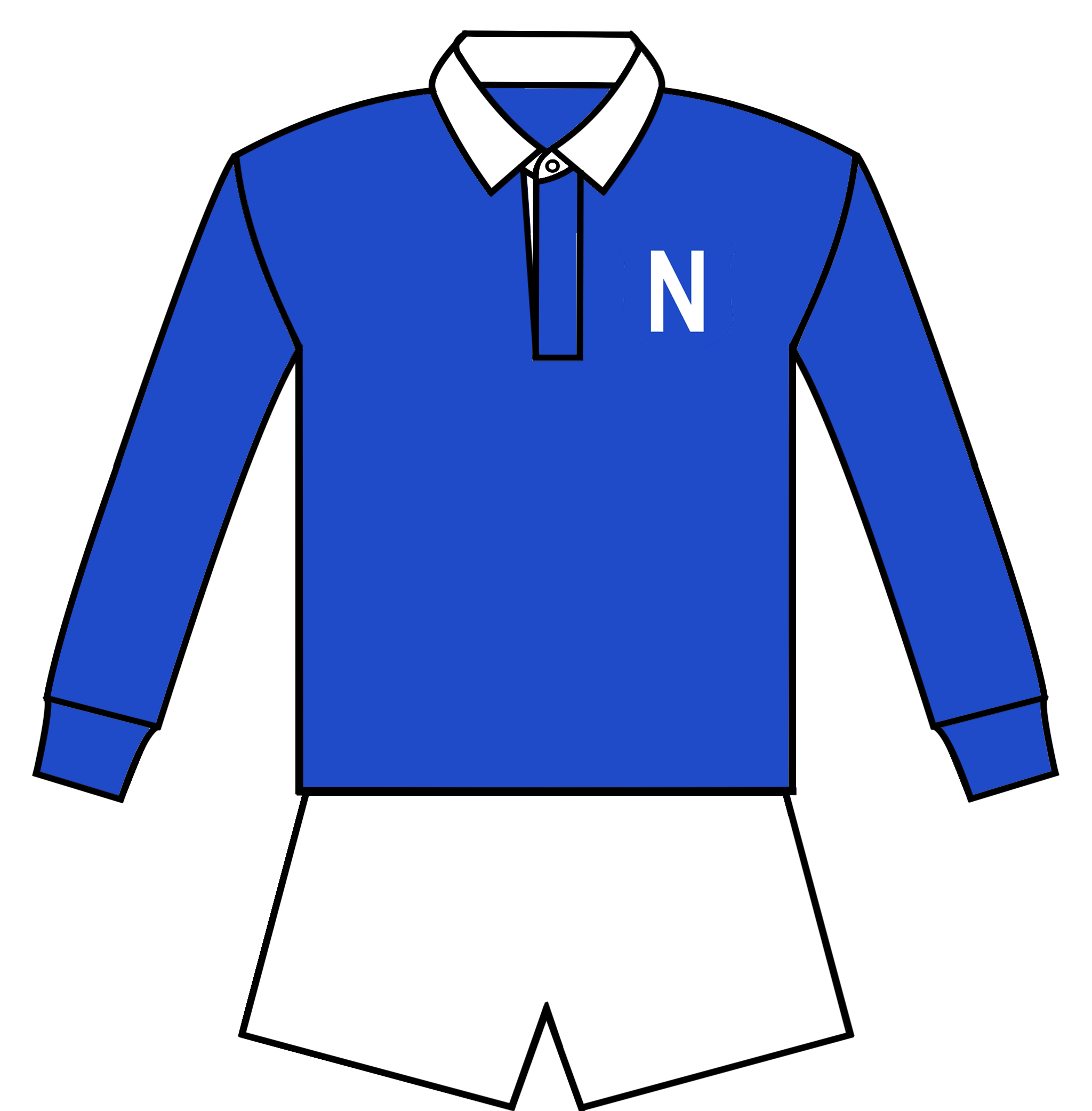
Newtown; Ground: Erskineville Oval; Captain: Paddy McCue

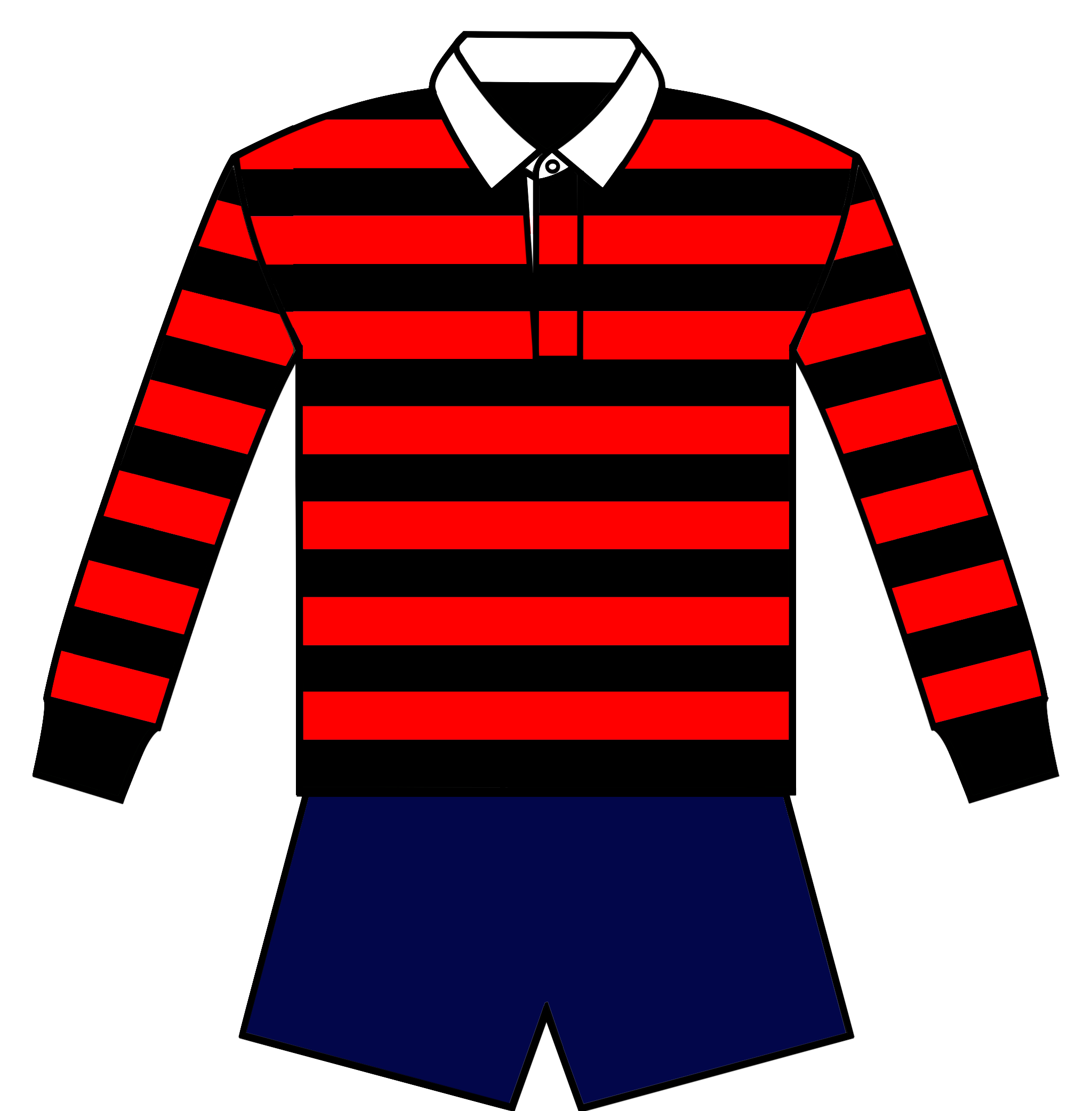
North Sydney; Ground: North Sydney Oval; Captain: Albert Broomham

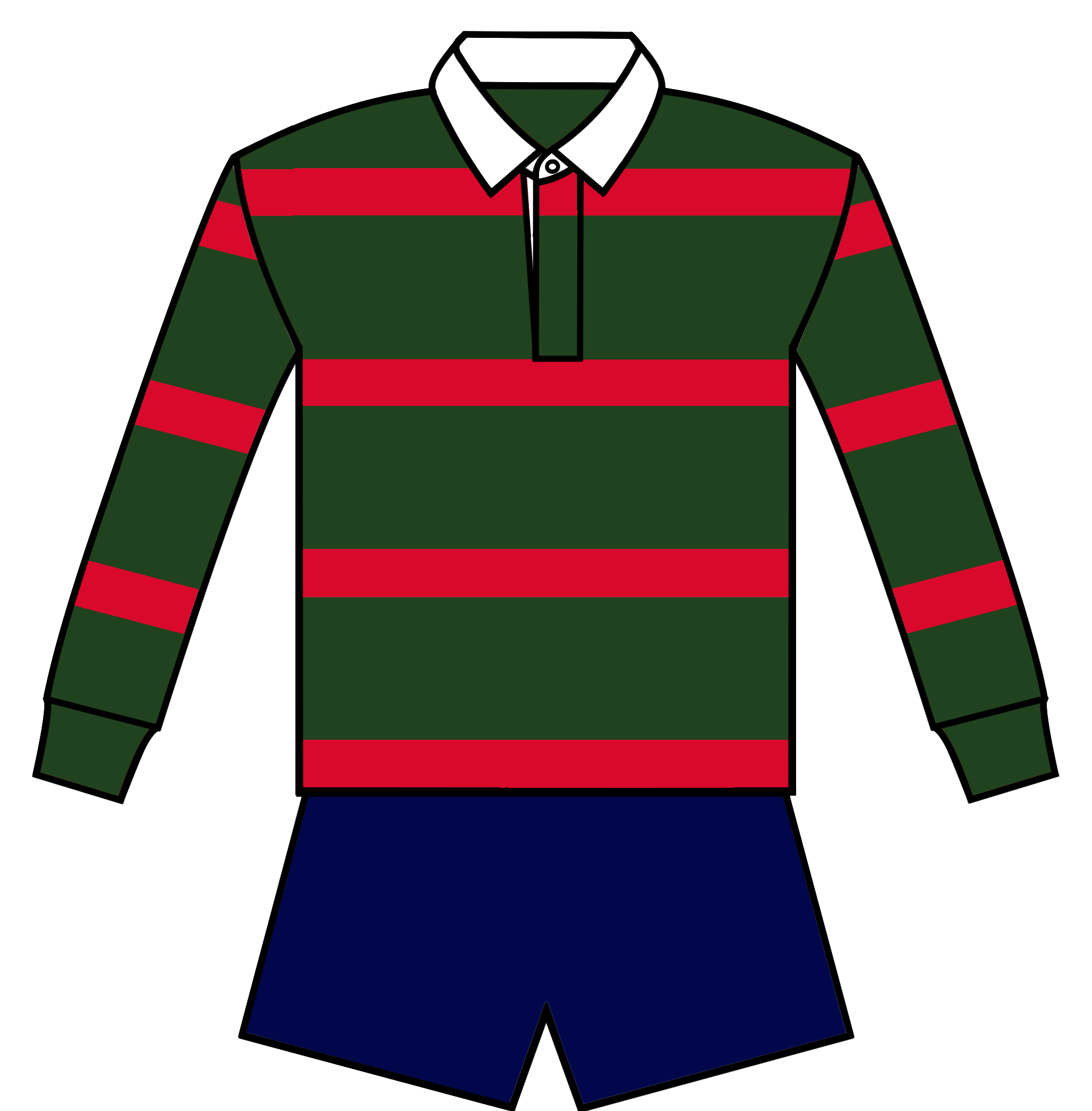
South Sydney; Ground: Sydney Cricket Ground; Captain: Arthur Butler

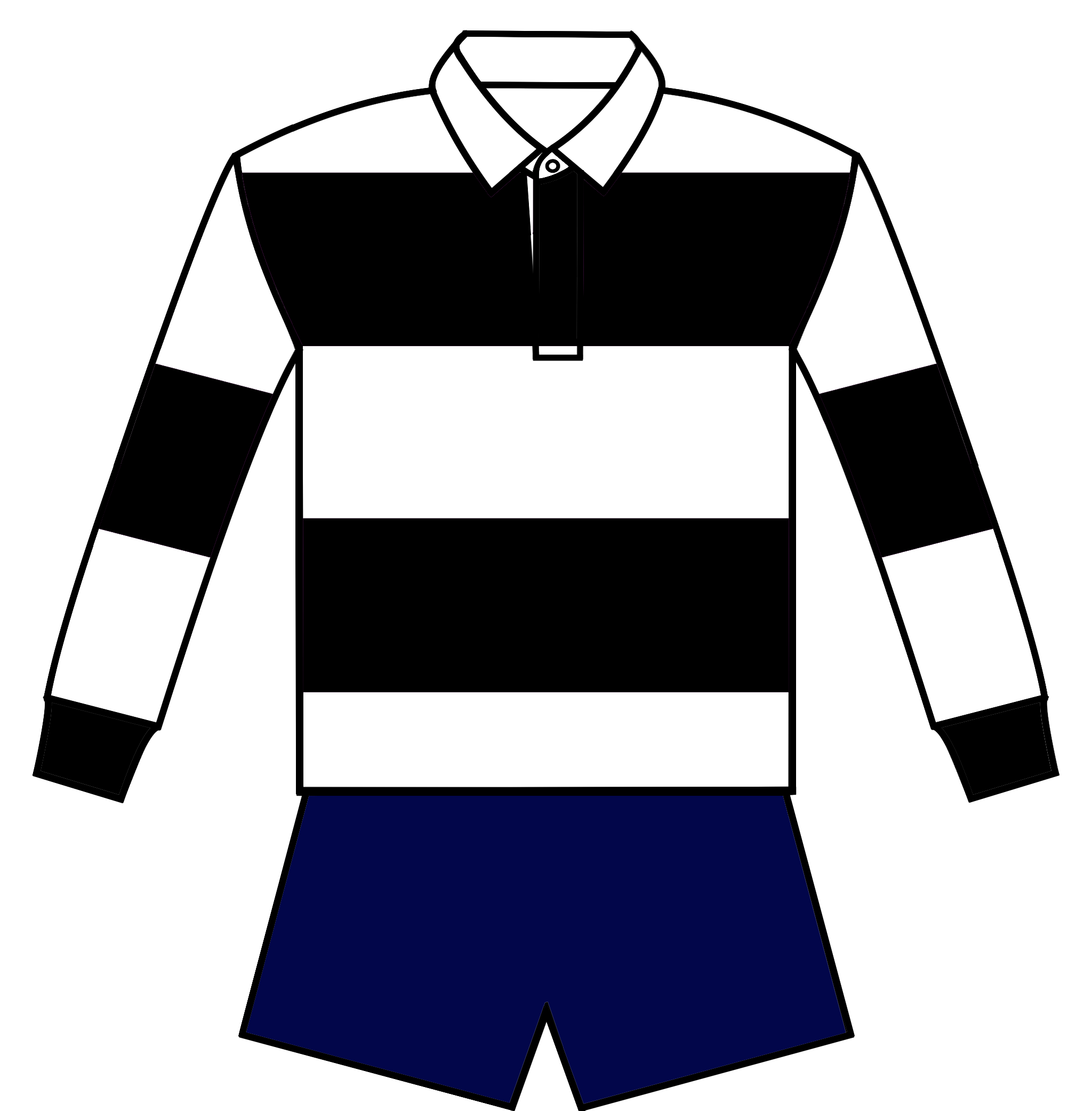
Western Suburbs; Ground: Pratten Park; Captain: Tedda Courtney

=== Ladder ===
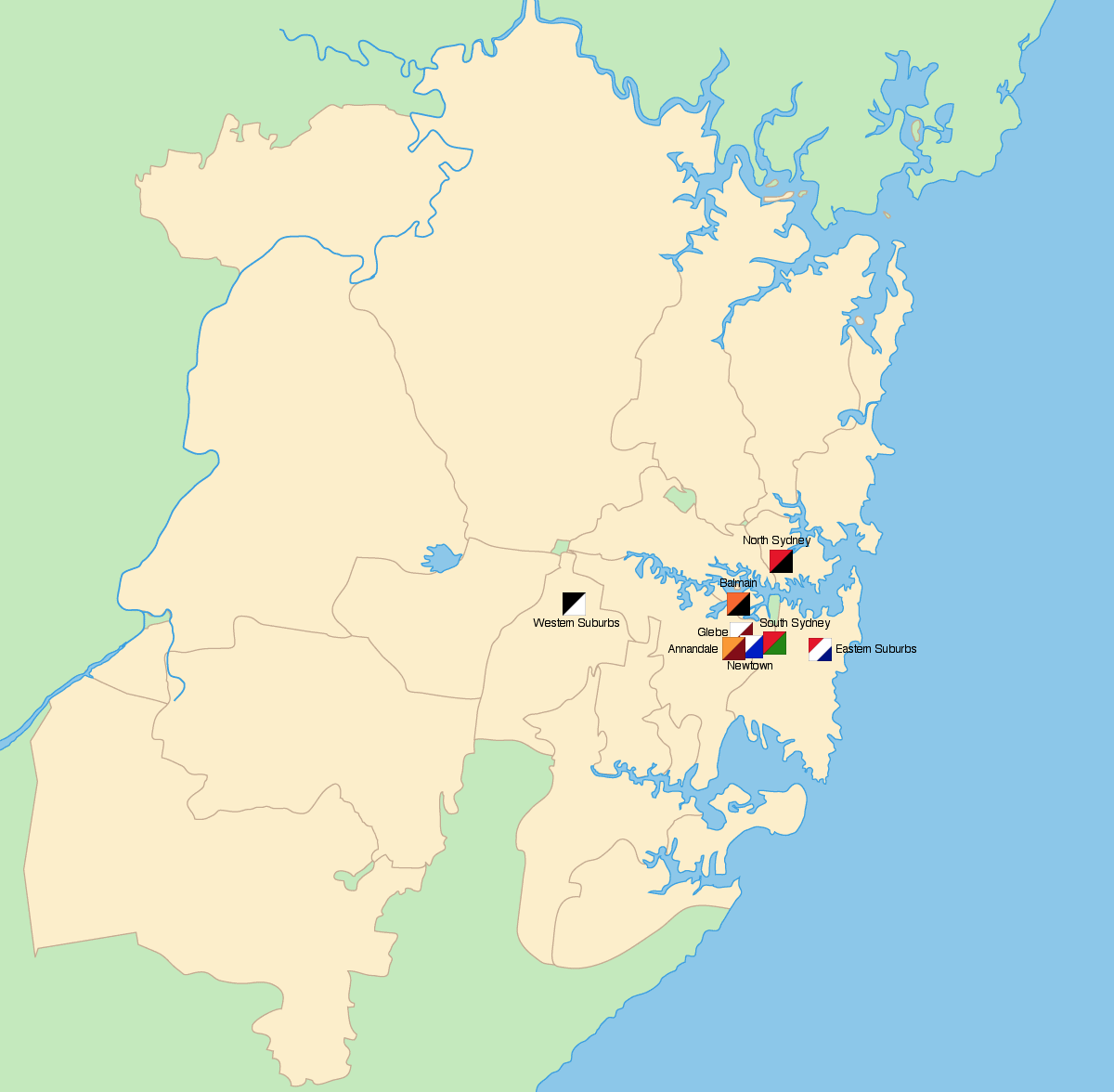
The geographical locations of the teams that contested the 1914 premiership across Sydney.

	Team	Pld	W	D	L	PF	PA	PD	Pts
1	South Sydney	14	11	1	2	166	79	+87	23
2	Newtown	14	11	0	3	185	111	+74	22
3	Eastern Suburbs	14	8	0	6	164	122	+42	16
4	Balmain	14	6	4	4	132	111	+21	16
5	Glebe	14	7	1	6	187	140	+47	15
6	North Sydney	14	5	1	8	158	165	-7	11
7	Western Suburbs	14	3	0	11	104	231	-127	6
8	Annandale	14	1	1	12	106	243	-137	3

== Sources ==
- Rugby League Tables - Notes AFL Tables
- Rugby League Tables - Season 1914 AFL Tables
- Premiership History and Statistics RL1908
- 1914 - South Sydney Edge Out Newtown RL1908
- Results: 1911-20 at rabbitohs.com.au

Collis, Ian; Whiticker, Alan (2007). 100 Years of Rugby League. Vol. 1. Chatswood, NSW: New Holland. p. 52. ISBN 978-1-74110-463-9.
