= Bobby Keyes (rugby league) =

Australian rugby league footballer (1942–2022)

Personal information
- Full name: Robert John Keyes
- Born: 18 December 1942 Sydney, New South Wales, Australia
- Died: 8 September 2022 (aged 79)

Playing information
- Position: Centre
Club
Years	Team	Pld	T	G	FG	P
1960–61	Eastern Suburbs	5	0	0	0	0
1962–70	Newtown	163	37	0	1	113
	Total	168	37	0	1	113
Representative
Years	Team	Pld	T	G	FG	P
1964	New South Wales	4	0	0	0	0
1964–66	NSW City	2	0	0	0	0

Robert John Keyes (18 December 1942 – 8 September 2022) was an Australian rugby league footballer who played in the 1960s and 1970s.

== Playing career ==
Keyes was an Easts junior who played five first grade games with Eastern Suburbs 1960–61 then signed with Newtown.

Keyes joined Newtown in 1962 and formed a long-standing and successful centre partnership with Brian 'Chicka' Moore until he retired in 1970.

Keyes also captained Newtown during his career and was also a representative player with New South Wales in 1964. He took the Newtown reserve grade team to the premiership in 1970 and then retired to the Second Division competition at the Ryde-Eastwood club.

Keyes was publican at Fortune of War Hotel, Millers Point, New South Wales.
