= Roy Farnsworth =

Australian rugby league footballer

Personal information
- Full name: Roy Eric Farnsworth
- Born: 5 January 1892 Marrickville, New South Wales, Australia
- Died: 19 June 1957 (aged 65) Concord, New South Wales, Australia

Playing information
- Position: Halfback
Club
Years	Team	Pld	T	G	FG	P
1911–15	Newtown	46	12	0	0	36
1919	Western Suburbs	4	0	0	0	0
	Total	50	12	0	0	36
Representative
Years	Team	Pld	T	G	FG	P
1912	New South Wales	2	0	0	0	0
1914–15	Metropolis	3	1	0	0	3
- Relatives: Bill Farnsworth (brother); Viv Farnsworth (brother)

Roy Eric Farnsworth (1892-1957) was an Australian rugby league footballer who played in the 1910s.

== Playing career ==
Youngest brother of the famous rugby league footballers: Bill Farnsworth and Viv Farnsworth, Roy Farnsworth was also a noted Half-back with Newtown. Roy enlisted in the Australian Army in World War I in 1915, and although he survived the war he did not play for Newtown again.

In 1919 he turned out for Western Suburbs for a few games, before retiring from the NSWRFL.

== Death ==
Farnsworth died on 19 June 1957 at Concord, New South Wales.
