= Viv Farnsworth =

Australia international rugby league footballer

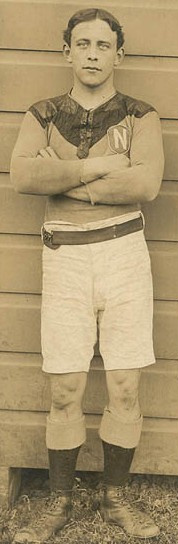
- Farnsworth in 1910

Personal information
- Full name: Vivian Robert Farnsworth
- Born: 4 February 1889 Newtown, New South Wales, Australia
- Died: 16 April 1953 (aged 64) Hurstville, New South Wales, Australia

Playing information
- Position: Centre
Club
Years	Team	Pld	T	G	FG	P
1910–12	Newtown	31	22	0	0	66
1912–17	Oldham	78	27	1	0	83
1919	Newtown	2	1	0	0	3
1920–21	Western Suburbs	12	6	0	0	18
	Total	123	56	1	0	170
Representative
Years	Team	Pld	T	G	FG	P
1910–19	New South Wales	9	2	0	0	6
1911–20	Australia	6	4	0	0	12
1910	Australasia	2	0	0	0	0
- Relatives: Roy Farnsworth (brother); Bill Farnsworth (brother)

Viv Farnsworth (4 February 1889 – 16 April 1953) was an Australian professional rugby league footballer who played in the 1910s and 1920s. He played for Newtown, Wests, New South Wales and Australia, he also represented Australasia. He primarily played as centre and is considered one of the Australia's finest footballers of the 20th century.

== Biography ==
=== Playing career ===
As a youth, Farnsworth played for Petersham Rugby Club in inner-western Sydney but he switched to the new professional code in 1909 and played for Newtown from 1910. He was regarded as an outstanding centre and, alongside his brother, Bill, was selected for New South Wales in 1910. Farnsworth was a member of the 1910 premiership winning Newtown team in the try-less final against Souths.

In the same year, the brothers made their international début against the touring British Lions and were both selected for the 'Australasian' Kangaroo tour of Britain in 1911–1912. They were the first set of brothers to play representative rugby league for Australia.

Viv Farnsworth made his Test début in the first Test against England on 8 November 1911 and scored two tries. He scored a total of 19 tries on tour (from 29 matches), one less than Herb Gilbert. The combination of Gilbert and Farnsworth was a feature of the successful tour. After touring New Zealand with New South Wales in 1912, Farnsworth headed back to England and joined the Oldham club. He was still in England at the out-break of the Great War and he subsequently enlisted with a Lancashire regiment.

After the war, Farnsworth re-joined Sydney club Newtown in 1919 but by 1920 he had moved to Wests where he played for two seasons. Farnsworth participated in the Ashes-winning series of 1920, again proving a formidable combination with Herb Gilbert in the second Test at the Sydney Cricket Ground. Although the score was even at 8–all at half-time, tries to Australia's three-quarter line of Dick Vest, Farnsworth, Gilbert and Harold Horder secured the Ashes. An injury in the third Test of the series eventually ended Farnsworth's playing career.

Viv Farnsworth died in 1953 aged 64.

=== Accolades ===
In February 2008, he was named in the list of Australia's 100 Greatest Players (1908–2007) which was commissioned by the Australian Rugby League and the National Rugby League to celebrate the code's centenary year in Australia. Viv Farnsworth was the great-uncle of the Parramatta Eels player and CEO, Denis Fitzgerald AM.

== Footnotes ==
- Statistics at orl-heritagetrust.org.uk
