= Jim Davis (rugby league) =

Australia international rugby league footballer

Personal information
- Full name: Walter James Davis
- Born: 13 April 1887 Waterloo, New South Wales, Australia
- Died: 9 February 1934 (aged 47) Parkes, New South Wales, Australia

Playing information
- Position: Second-row, Lock
Club
Years	Team	Pld	T	G	FG	P
1908–10	South Sydney	30	8	20	0	64
1911	North Sydney	11	0	1	0	2
1912	South Sydney	8	2	0	0	6
1913	Glebe	12	1	3	0	9
1914–19	South Sydney	27	2	0	0	6
	Parkes
	Total	88	13	24	0	87
Representative
Years	Team	Pld	T	G	FG	P
1908–12	New South Wales	8	1	6	0	15
1908–09	Australia	3	1	1	0	5

Jim Davis (1887–1934) was a pioneer Australian rugby league footballer. He was one of his country's first national representative players making the 1908–09 Kangaroo tour of Great Britain and then had a patchy first-grade club career in the first decade of the code's popularity in Sydney.

== Career ==
=== Club ===
Davis had been a South Sydney rugby union junior before he joined the new South Sydney rugby league club in its inaugural 1908 season. He initially played three seasons with the club and was sent off in the 1910 Grand Final played against Newtown. He played the 1911 NSWRFL season with North Sydney before playing three seasons with the Glebe club. His top-grade career finished up back at Souths in 1918-19 before concluding with a country stint at Parkes.

=== Representative ===
Davis made his debut Test appearance in 1908 against New Zealand, appearing in both matches of the first rugby league international series played by an Australian representative side. At the end of that season he was selected in the 35-man squad to make the first-ever Kangaroo Tour. Davis played in six tour matches but in none of the three Test matches played. In the 1909 season, he returned to test selection playing in the first test against New Zealand. He is listed on the Australian Players Register as Kangaroo No. 3.

== Death ==
Davis became depressed when unable to find work during the Depression, and in 1934 he killed himself. The inquest into his death was held at Parkes, New South Wales on 22 February 1934. Davis's body was found in the Peoples Park, Parkes on the morning of 9 February 1934. The deceased's wrists had been cut, and the verdict was suicide. A suicide note was also produced during the Inquest.
