= Col Murphy =

Australian rugby league footballer and coach

Personal information
- Full name: Colin Murphy
- Born: 4 January 1958 (age 68) Sydney, New South Wales, Australia

Playing information
- Position: Second-row, Lock, Wing
Club
Years	Team	Pld	T	G	FG	P
1976–83	Newtown Jets	62	4	0	0	13
1984	North Sydney Bears	4	0	0	0	0
1985	South Sydney	5	3	0	0	0
	Total	71	7	0	0	13

Coaching information
Club
Years	Team	Gms	W	D	L	W%
1990–97	Newtown Jets
1998	Western Suburbs
	Total	0	0	0	0
- Source: As of 5 June 2019

Col Murphy is an Australian former rugby league footballer who played in the 1970s and 1980s. He played for the Newtown Jets, North Sydney and the South Sydney Rabbitohs in the New South Wales Rugby League (NSWRL) competition.

== Playing career ==
Murphy made his debut for Newtown against South Sydney in 1976. Murphy's first 3 seasons saw the club finish last on the table in 1976, 1977 and 1978. In 1979, Newtown appointed Warren Ryan as head coach who turned the club from a struggling team to one of the premiership contenders by 1981. Murphy missed most of the 1981 season and was unfortunate not to be selected in the grand final team which lost against Parramatta.

Murphy played 8 games for Newtown in 1983 which would prove to be the club's last in the top grade of Australian rugby league. Newtown's final ever match in the NSWRL premiership, which was a 9–6 victory over the Canberra Raiders at Campbelltown Stadium.

In 1984, Murphy joined North Sydney after Newtown were evicted from the premiership due to financial reasons. Murphy played only 4 games for Norths and he was released to join South Sydney. Murphy played 4 games for Souths in 1985 and retired at the end of the season.

== Coaching career ==
Murphy became the head coach of Newtown in the 1990s as the club was then playing in the Metropolitan Cup now known as the Ron Massey Cup. Murphy guided Newtown to premiership victories in the competition between 1995 and 1997.

Murphy then coached the Western Suburbs reserve grade side in the late 1990s.
