= Clarrie Jeffreys =

Australian rugby league footballer and coach (1932–2020)

Personal information
- Full name: Clarence George Jeffreys
- Born: 6 August 1932
- Died: 27 August 2020 (aged 88)

Playing information
- Position: Hooker, Second-row
Club
Years	Team	Pld	T	G	FG	P
1953–55	Balmain	13	2	0	0	6
1958–68	Newtown	89	0	0	0	0
	Total	102	2	0	0	6

Coaching information
Club
Years	Team	Gms	W	D	L	W%
1974–76	Newtown	66	19	4	43	29

Clarence George Jeffreys (or Jeffries; 6 August 1932 – 27 August 2020) was an Australian rugby league footballer who played in the 1950s and 1960s, and coached in the 1970s.

== Playing career ==
Jeffreys started his playing career at Balmain in 1953. He played three seasons at the Tigers before moving to Newtown in 1958. He played over 200 grade games with Newtown including 84 in first grade, mainly playing hooker. He retired in 1968, and returned to the club as a lower grade coach.

== Coaching career ==
Jeffreys took over the role of first grade coach in 1974 after Jack Gibson resigned. Jeffreys coached the club for three years, during a tough period in the club's history.
