= Wally Dymant =

Australian rugby league footballer

Personal information
- Full name: Walter Charles Dymant
- Born: 16 December 1888 Sydney, New South Wales, Australia
- Died: 28 April 1969 (aged 80) Davistown, New South Wales, Australia

Playing information
- Position: Fullback, Centre, Wing
Club
Years	Team	Pld	T	G	FG	P
1911–17	South Sydney	32	0	30	0	60

Walter Charles Dymant (1888–1969) was a pioneer Australian rugby league footballer who played in the 1910s.

Dymant played five seasons with South Sydney in 1911 and then between 1914 and 1917, which included the 1916 Final which Souths lost to Balmain. Dymant was a member of the South Sydney squad that won the 1914 Premiership.

Dymant died on 28 April 1969, at his Davistown, New South Wales home, aged 80.
