= Ernie Hucker =

Australian rugby league footballer

Personal information
- Full name: Ernie Hucker
- Born: 3 June 1887 Waterloo, New South Wales, Australia
- Died: 3 July 1970 (aged 83) Sydney, New South Wales, Australia

Playing information
- Position: Wing
Club
Years	Team	Pld	T	G	FG	P
1910	South Sydney	8	3	0	0	9
1911	North Sydney	10	4	12	0	57
1912	South Sydney	10	2	0	0	6
1913	Balmain	7	1	0	0	3
	Total	35	10	12	0	75

Ernest Walter Hucker (1887–1970) was an Australian rugby league footballer who played in the 1910s.

== Background ==
Hucker was born at Waterloo, New South Wales in 1887, and like many other young guys of the era, grew up playing rugby union.

== Playing career ==
Hucker switched to the new code of rugby league at the inception of the South Sydney Rabbitohs in 1908, and was playing first grade for the club by 1910, and he played prop in the 1910 Final. He switched clubs to North Sydney in 1911, then switched back to South Sydney Rabbitohs for 1912 and for his final season he switched clubs again, this time to the Balmain club for 1913.

His only representative appearance was for the Sydney (Metropolis) team in 1911.

Hucker died on 3 July 1970 aged 83.
