= Albert Hawkes (rugby league) =

Australian rugby league footballer

Personal information
- Full name: Albert Silas Hawkes
- Born: 16 April 1887 Newtown, New South Wales, Australia
- Died: 13 March 1962 (aged 74) Newtown, New South Wales, Australia

Playing information
- Position: Centre
Club
Years	Team	Pld	T	G	FG	P
1909–12	Newtown	35	10	14	0	58
Representative
Years	Team	Pld	T	G	FG	P
1909	Australia	1	0	0	0	0
1909	New South Wales	1	0	0	0	0

Albert Hawkes (1887−1962) nicknamed "Alby" was a pioneer Australian rugby league footballer who played in the 1900s and 1910s. He played for Newtown in the New South Wales Rugby League (NSWRL) competition, as a centre.

== Playing career ==
Hawkes played in the club's first ever premiership victory drawing 4–4 with Souths in the 1910 NSWRL grand final. In the dying minutes of the game Souths led 4-2 until Howard Hallett kicked the ball from the near the Souths goal line.

Hawkes caught the ball on the full near the halfway line and on the touch line. The rules allowed Newtown to claim a fair mark which meant they had the chance to tie the game with a shot at goal. Newtown converted the penalty drawing the game but since they had finished first on the table during the regular season, they were declared premiership winners.

Hawkes played two further seasons before retiring at the end of 1912. Hawkes also played one game for Australia and one game for New South Wales at representative level.
