= Fred Munnery =

Australian rugby league footballer

Personal information
- Full name: Frederick Munnery
- Born: 1881 New Zealand
- Died: 28 October 1947 (aged 65–66) Lakemba, New South Wales

Playing information
- Position: Wing
Club
Years	Team	Pld	T	G	FG	P
1909–10	Newtown	16	6	0	0	18
Representative
Years	Team	Pld	T	G	FG	P
1910	Metropolis	1	0	0	0	0

Fred Munnery (1881-1947) was an Australian rugby league footballer who played in the 1900s and 1910s.

== Playing career ==
Munnery was a foundation player with the Newtown club, who played first grade for two season. Like many of the earliest Rugby League players, Munnery was an ex rugby union player that switched coded when the NSWRFL was established in 1908. Munnery was a local from Marrickville, New South Wales and was a very good winger.

Munnery made his first grade debut for Newtown against the Newcastle Rebels side in Round 4 1909, scoring 2 tries in a 13–5 victory. In 1910, Munnery was a member of the Newtown side which won the 1910 premiership defeating South Sydney in the grand final. The match was drawn 4–4 at full time but Newtown were awarded the premiership due to the fact that they finished as minor premiers.

== Death ==
Munnery died on 28 October 1947 at Lakemba, New South Wales.
