= Bill Farnsworth =

Australian RL coach and former Australia international rugby league footballer

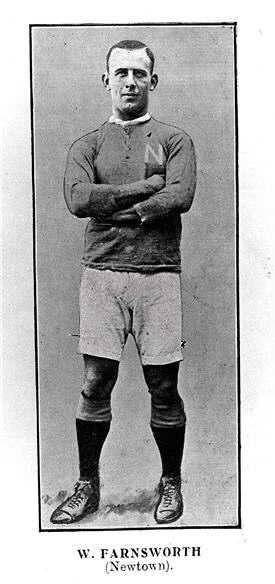

Personal information
- Full name: Andrew William Farnsworth
- Born: 14 January 1887 Newtown, New South Wales, Australia
- Died: 30 October 1966 (aged 79) Waterfall, New South Wales

Playing information
- Position: Five-eighth
Club
Years	Team	Pld	T	G	FG	P
1910–12	Newtown	23	4	0	0	12
1912–20	Oldham	93	7	0	0	21
	Total	116	11	0	0	33
Representative
Years	Team	Pld	T	G	FG	P
1910–11	New South Wales	8	3	0	0	9
1912	Queensland	2	0	0	0	0
1910–11	Australia	4	0	0	0	0
1910	Australasia	2	0	0	0	0

Coaching information
Club
Years	Team	Gms	W	D	L	W%
1924	Newtown
- Source: Whiticker
- Relatives: Roy Farnsworth (brother); Viv Farnsworth (brother)

Andrew William Farnsworth (14 January 1887 – 30 October 1966) was an Australian pioneer rugby league footballer who played in the 1910s whose club career was played in Sydney with Newtown. He represented at state level for both New South Wales and Queensland, and at the national level for Australia and Australasia. He is the brother of fellow New South Wales and Australian representative, and Newtown player Viv Farnsworth.

== Rugby Union career ==
Farnsworth's rugby union career was played with the Newtown club and he was invited to join the new rebel code from the outset to play against Albert Baskerville's All Golds when they arrived in Sydney in 1907. Farnsworth stayed true to rugby union and remained an amateur till 1909.

== Rugby League career ==
In NSWRFL season 1910, he joined the rugby league ranks and commenced playing with the Newtown club. During the 1910 Great Britain Lions tour of Australia and New Zealand, Bill Farnsworth and his brother, Viv, made their international debut against the British Lions. With Newtown Farnsworth also won the premiership that year.

The following year the Farnsworth brothers were selected for the 'Australasian' Kangaroo tour of Britain in 1911–1912. They were the first set of brothers to play representative rugby league for Australia. Their brother Roy also played at Newtown.

Farnsworth also played in Brisbane for Toombul and Kurilpa, gaining selection for Queensland in 1912.

With his brother Viv, he headed to England and the end of 1912 and joined the Oldham club. He was still in England at the out-break of the Great War and enlisted for active duty. He continued playing for Oldham 'til 1920.

Farnsworth returned to the Newtown club as coach for part of the 1924 NSWRFL season.

== Cricket career ==
Farnsworth also played in two first-class cricket matches: one in 1908-09 for New South Wales and one in 1919 for Lancashire. He became the first player to represent New South Wales at Rugby, Rugby League and Cricket.

== Accolades ==
Bill Farnsworth was the great-uncle of the Parramatta Eels ex player and CEO Denis Fitzgerald. His youngest brother Roy Farnsworth also played for Newtown. In 2008, the centenary year of rugby league in Australia, Farnsworth was named as five-eighth of the Newtown Jets 18-man team of the century.

== See also ==
- List of New South Wales representative cricketers

== Sources ==
- Alan Whiticker & Glen Hudson (2007). The Encyclopedia of Rugby League Players. Wetherill Park, New South Wales: Gary Allen Pty Ltd. p. 269. ISBN 978-1-877082-93-1.
