= Joe Murray (rugby league) =

Australian rugby league footballer

Personal information
- Full name: Joseph Murray
- Born: 6 October 1887 Newtown, New South Wales
- Died: 28 April 1944 (aged 56) Camperdown, New South Wales

Playing information
- Position: Lock, Second-row
Club
| Years | Team | Pld | T | G | FG | P |
|---|---|---|---|---|---|---|
| 1908–14 | Newtown | 60 | 11 | 0 | 0 | 33 |
| 1915, 1920 | North Sydney | 17 | 2 | 0 | 0 | 6 |
| | Total | 77 | 13 | 0 | 0 | 39 |
Representative
| Years | Team | Pld | T | G | FG | P |
| 1912–13 | New South Wales | 4 | 0 | 0 | 0 | 0 |
- Military career
- Allegiance: Australia
- Branch: Australian Army
- Service years: 1915-1918
- Unit: Australian Imperial Force
- Conflicts: World War I; Western Front
- Awards: DCM

Joe Murray (1887–1944) was an Australian rugby league footballer who played in the 1900s, 1910s and 1920s. He played for Newtown and North Sydney in the New South Wales Rugby League (NSWRL) competition as a lock but also played as a second rower.

== Playing career ==
Murray made his debut for Newtown in 1908 which was the inaugural year that the NSWRL competition began. In 1910, Murray was a member of the Newtown side which won their first-ever premiership drawing with South Sydney 4–4 in the grand final. Newtown were declared premiers after the match had concluded because they had finished the regular season in first place. In 1912 and 1913, Murray represented New South Wales on four occasions.

== War service ==
In 1915, Murray joined North Sydney and then enlisted in the Australian Imperial Force (AIF) and went to the Great War. On 2 June 1917, Joe Murray was awarded the Distinguished Conduct Medal (D.C.M.) for bravery and devotion to duty during active service in France.

After the war, he returned to North Sydney for one last season in 1920.

Joe Murray died at Gloucester House (RPA Hospital), Camperdown, New South Wales, on 28 April 1944.
