= Paul Akkary =

Australian rugby league footballer (born 1962)

Personal information
- Full name: Paul David Akkary
- Born: 12 January 1962 (age 64) Sydney, New South Wales, Australia

Playing information
- Position: Prop
Club
Years	Team	Pld	T	G	FG	P
1981	Newtown	6	0	0	0	0
1984–85	South Sydney	27	0	0	0	0
1986–88	Penrith Panthers	29	1	0	0	4
1989	Canterbury Bulldogs	1	0	2	0	0
	Total	63	1	2	0	4

Paul Akkary (born 12 January 1962) is an Australian former rugby league footballer who played in the 1980s.

He played for Newtown for three seasons between 1981 and 1983, South Sydney for two seasons between 1984 and 1985, Penrith for three seasons between 1986 and 1988 and Canterbury-Bankstown for one season in 1989. He had a nine-year first grade career and played 63 games.
