= Mick Howell (referee) =

Australian rugby league referee and administration officer

Michael Howell is an Australian former rugby league referee and senior administration officer.

== Rugby league ==
Howell played rugby league prior to becoming a referee. In 1973, he was a member of the Newtown Jets teams that won the New South Wales Rugby League (NSWRL) club championship.

Howell began his refereeing career in the Newtown District Junior Rugby League. He was subsequently graded in 1981 to referee in the NSWRL. He went on to become a very successful touch judge, officiating in 242 top-grade matches. His most notable appointments included the Grand Finals in 1988 and 1991, the 1989 and 1996 State of Origin series, and an Australia-France test match in 1990. He retired as a referee and touch judge at the end of the 1999 season.

Howell lodged an application with the Chief Industrial Magistrate's Court in 2005 as a test case, seeking long service leave from the NSWRL for his 18 years of service. His application was dismissed as the Court found that he had been employed over four separate periods of time, none of which were eligible for long service leave.

== Career ==
Away from football, Howell was an officer in the New South Wales public sector. From 1990 to 2008 he was the General Manager and Chief Executive Officer of NSW Lotteries.
