= Michael Speechley =

Australian rugby league footballer

Personal information
- Full name: Michael Speechley
- Born: 29 April 1964 (age 62)

Playing information
- Height: 178 cm (5 ft 10 in)
- Weight: 76 kg (12 st 0 lb)
- Position: Five-eighth
Club
Years	Team	Pld	T	G	FG	P
1983	Newtown	16	5	1	0	22
1984–85	South Sydney	4	0	0	0	0
1986–92	Cronulla Sharks	120	13	0	4	56
1993–95	Parramatta Eels	33	2	0	0	8
	Total	173	20	1	4	86

Michael Speechley (born 29 April 1964) is an Australian former professional rugby league footballer who played for Newtown, South Sydney, Cronulla-Sutherland and the Parramatta Eels. His career spanned thirteen seasons in first-grade Australian competition. He primarily played at five-eighth.

== Playing career ==
Speechley began his first-grade career with Newtown in 1983, making his first-grade debut in Round 2 against North Sydney.

Nicknamed “The Lawnmower” by a commentator in reference to his tackling technique, Speechley played in Newtown's final-ever game in the top grade, which was against Canberra in Round 26, 1983. Newtown won the match at Campbelltown Stadium 9–6, with Speechley scoring a try.

After Newtown were removed from the competition at the end of that year, Speechley spent two seasons with South Sydney before signing with Cronulla in 1986. In 1988, Speechley was part of the Cronulla side which won the minor premiership, but fell short of a grand final appearance after the Sharks lost to Balmain in the preliminary final.

After playing 120 games for the club, Speechley left Cronulla at the end of the 1992 season and signed with Parramatta. Speechley spent three injury-affected seasons with the Eels as the club hovered around the foot of the table. In Speechley's last year at Parramatta in 1995, they won only won three games for the entire season.

In 2015, an article by The Daily Telegraph revealed that, at the time of his retirement, Speechley was the last active former Newtown player.
