= Brian Moore (rugby league) =

Australian RL coach and former Australia international rugby league footballer

Brian 'Chicka' Moore
Personal information
- Full name: Brian Reginald Moore
- Born: 19 April 1944 Sydney, New South Wales, Australia
- Died: 26 October 2014 (aged 70)

Playing information
- Position: Centre
Club
Years	Team	Pld	T	G	FG	P
1962–73	Newtown	173	90	0	0	270
	Macquarie
	Total	173	90	0	0	270
Representative
Years	Team	Pld	T	G	FG	P
1963–70	New South Wales	3	2	0	0	6
1966–70	NSW City	3	2	0	0	6
1967–68	Australia	0	0	0	0	0

Coaching information
Club
Years	Team	Gms	W	D	L	W%
1983	Newtown	26	7	2	17	27

Brian "Chicka" Moore (19 April 1944 – 26 October 2014) was an Australian rugby league footballer and coach.

== Playing career ==
Moore played in the New South Wales Rugby Football League premiership for Newtown from 1962 to 1973 – scoring 90 tries during his long and successful career. He represented New South Wales in 1963, 1965 and 1970. He also represented Australia, touring Great Britain and France with the 1967/68 Kangaroos, playing 11 minor tour matches but no tests.

During the 1970s Moore captain-coached in the Newcastle Rugby League with the Macquarie United club. While playing football, Moore also served in the New South Wales Police Force and in 2008, rugby league's centenary year in Australia, he was named at centre in a NSW Police team of the century.

== Coaching career ==
Moore later coached Newtown for its final season, the 1983 Winfield Cup Premiership.

== Post playing ==
In 2008, Brian 'Chicka' Moore was named in the Newtown team of the century. He died following a long illness on 26 October 2014.
