= Howard Hallett =

Australian RL coach and former Australia international rugby league footballer

Personal information
- Full name: George Ernest Howard Hallett
- Born: 13 April 1890 Sydney, New South Wales, Australia
- Died: 28 May 1970 (aged 80) Maroubra, New South Wales, Australia

Playing information
- Height: 175 cm (5 ft 9 in)
- Weight: 80 kg (12 st 8 lb)
- Position: Fullback, Centre
Club
Years	Team	Pld	T	G	FG	P
1909–24	South Sydney	155	23	22	12	137
Representative
Years	Team	Pld	T	G	FG	P
1909–14	New South Wales	23	5	3	2	25
1911–14	Australia	6	1	0	0	3
1910–14	Metropolis	3	0	0	0	0

Coaching information
Club
Years	Team	Gms	W	D	L	W%
1925–26	South Sydney	28	26	0	2	93

Howard Hallett (1890–1970) was an Australian rugby league footballer and coach for South Sydney of the New South Wales Rugby League premiership. Hallett primarily played at fullback. He represented for New South Wales and Australia and is considered one of the nation's finest footballers of the 20th century

== Playing career ==
Hallett was originally an Australian rules footballer and once kicked eighteen goals for the Crown Street Public School against Ultimo. He graduated with Souths in 1908, the first season of rugby league in Australia and made his debut in the first-grade team in 1909. Hallett was a playing member of three premiership-winning teams; 1909, 1914 and 1918. At the end of the 1914 season, Hallett was awarded a silver belt by the Sanderson Whiskey company as Player of the Season. Hallett was first selected to play for New South Wales in 1911. In the same year he was selected to tour with the 1911–12 Kangaroo tour of Great Britain, making his debut playing against the Northern Union at Newcastle as a centre and scoring his one and only test try. He played the remaining two tests at fullback. Hallett toured with New South Wales to New Zealand in both the 1913 inaugural tour and 1914. Hallett's final year as a member of the national team was in 1914 when the Northern Union toured Australia.

In a game against Western Suburbs in 1924, Hallett was involved in a heavy collision, fracturing his jaw. Weeks later, he had surgery on his jaw. The scalpel from the surgeon however, left a permanent mark on the side of his face.

== Coaching career ==
Hallett retired from first-grade in 1924 and in 1925 he was back at Souths as coach. He coached the team through their only unbeaten season; twelve games. The final two games of the season were cancelled as Souths sat at the top of the ladder, ten points ahead of their nearest rival. A four-team semi-finals series, along with other rule changes to speed up the game, was introduced in 1926 in an effort by the NSWRL to attract crowds back to the matches. Hallett once again coached his team to the top of the premiership ladder, with eleven points separating Souths from the Glebe Dirty Reds, and took the team on to win the first finals series. Hallett retired from coaching at the end of the 1926 season.

== After football ==
Hallett's son, Howard Hallett Jnr, played 7 seasons for South Sydney between 1940 and 1949.

Hallett died on 28 May 1970.

In February 2008, Hallett was named in the list of Australia's 100 Greatest Players (1908–2007) which was commissioned by the NRL and ARL to celebrate the code's centenary year in Australia.

== Footnotes ==
- Whiticker, Alan; Hudson, Glen (2007). The Encyclopedia of Rugby League Players. Wetherill Park, New South Wales: Gary Allen Pty Ltd. p. 214. ISBN 978-1-877082-93-1.
- Collis, Ian; Whiticker, Alan (2007). 100 Years of Rugby League. Vol. 1. Chatswood, NSW: New Holland. ISBN 978-1-74110-463-9.
