= Newtown Jets =

Rugby league football club, based in Marrickville, NSW

Club information
- Full name: Newtown District Rugby League Football Club Limited
- Nickname(s): Bluebags, Jets
- Colours: Blue white
- Founded: 14 January 1908; 118 years ago (foundation club)
- Exited: 1983; 43 years ago
- Website: newtownjets.com

Former details
- Ground: Henson Park — 30,000
- Coach: George Ndaira
- Competition: NSW Cup
- 2025 Season: 6th

Uniforms
Home colours

Records
- Premierships: 3 (1910, 1933, 1943)
- Runners-up: 7 (1913, 1914, 1929, 1944, 1954, 1955, 1981)
- Minor premierships: 6 (1910, 1933, 1943, 1944, 1954, 1955)
- NSW Cup Premierships: 9 (1922,1947,1948,1951,1970,1974 2012, 2019, 2024)
- NRL State Championship: 1 (2019)
- Wooden spoons: 8 (1924, 1925, 1928, 1939, 1968, 1976, 1977, 1978)

The Newtown Jets are a rugby league football club based in Marrickville, a suburb of Sydney's inner west. They currently compete in the NSW Cup competition, having left the top grade after the 1983 NSWRFL season. The Jets' home ground is Henson Park, and their team colours are blue (traditionally royal blue) and white.

Established in 1908, Newtown were one of the founding members of the New South Wales Rugby Football League. They competed continuously in the NSWRFL premiership until their departure in 1983, the first reduction in the League since 1937. Over this period they won the competition three times.

== History ==
=== NSWRFL Premiership ===
The club was founded on 14 January 1908 at a public meeting held at Newtown Town Hall that had been convened by the prominent Sydney sportsman James J. Giltinan (after whom the NSW Rugby League Premiership shield is named), local MP Henry Hoyle, and Harry Hamill, who was to be the fledgling club's first captain.

Newtown was the second rugby league football club to be founded in Australia and is the oldest in existence. The first club, Glebe, was formed on 9 January 1908. When the 'Dirty Reds' (Glebe) were controversially excluded from the NSWRL Premiership in 1929, Newtown became the oldest remaining Australian club.

Chart of yearly table positions for Newtown Jets in First Grade NSWRL

There is some discussion however over whether or not Newtown was actually the first Rugby league club in Australia, being formed on 8 January 1908, one day earlier than Glebe. The club's website stands by this claim, however other sources, most notably Terry Williams' book Out of the Blue: The History of Newtown RLFC, dispute this claim. Rugby league historian Sean Fagan similarly holds that the date of 14 January 1908 is the correct foundation day. The minutes of the original meeting held by Newtown's Board shows the date as 8 January. A Newtown winger, Jack Scott, was the first to score a try in the New South Wales Rugby League premiership.

Newtown played in the NSWRFL Premiership from 1908 to 1983. They won the 1910 NSWRFL Premiership after drawing the final was enough to see them win due to being minor premiers.

In 1929, Newtown would reach the grand final against the all conquering South Sydney side but would lose 30-10. In 1933, Newtown claimed their second premiership defeating St. George 18-5 in the grand final. In 1943, Newtown claimed their third and final premiership defeating North Sydney 34-7 in what was then a record grand final crowd of 60,922. The following season in 1944, Newtown finished as minor premiers but were defeated by Balmain in the grand final. The rules at the time allowed Newtown to challenge Balmain for a rematch which they also lost 12-8. In the 1950s, Newtown reached back to back grand finals in 1954 and 1955 losing to South Sydney on both occasions.

Known as the "Newtown Bluebags" for most of its lifetime, the club adopted the Jets nickname in 1973, referring to Newtown's catchment area under the nearby Sydney Airport flight path, and the need for a modern club identity.

Jack Gibson took over as Newtown coach in 1973. Gibson picked his team solely on form, irrespective of seniority. The great Brian Moore had been relegated to the reserves bench throughout the preliminary rounds of the Wills Cup tournament, and youngsters like Ian Satori, Dennis Gardiner, Peter Parry and Warren Snodgrass were all given a chance in the top grade. The Newtown side for the final was:

Barry Cox, Mark Cohen, Dave Oliveri, John Bonham, John Bradstock, Ken Wilson, Des O'Connor (c), Neil Pringle, Gary Sullivan, Peter Parry, Tom Melville, Mark Robertson and Dennis Gardiner.

The St. George lineup was:

Graeme Langlands, Geoff Carr, Ted Goodwin, Bob Clapham, John Chapman, Tony Branson, M. Shulman, Lindsay Drake, Peter Fitzgerald, Rod Reddy, Inisai Toga, Colin Rasmussen, and Harry Eden.

The Wills Cup Final was played under floodlights at the old Sydney Sports Ground on St Patricks day before a crowd of 13,180. At halftime St. George were up 15-2 and looked certain to win. In the second half the Newtown forward pack gave the Saints a taste of their own medicine which helped gain tries for Melville and Robertson, both converted by Ken Wilson which reduced the St George lead to 15–12. Brian Moore brought on at halftime, scored the final try, converted by Ken Wilson which sealed victory for Newtown in the last minute, making the game one of the most exciting comeback wins in rugby league history.

After Gibson departed the Newtown side as head coach, the club went through another period of decline and finished last in the 1976, 1977 and 1978 seasons. In 1979, the club appointed Warren Ryan as head coach who turned the club's fortunes around again once more.

The 1981 Newtown team, which played in the club's last NSWRL premiership grand final, included the legends of game Tommy Raudonikis and Phil Gould. It was coached by Warren Ryan. Newtown had led the match 7–6 at halftime against Parramatta but were defeated 20–11 at the Sydney Cricket Ground.

=== Ejection from the Premiership ===
Along with financial pressures, the club was forced out of the NSWRL Premiership at the end of 1983. The club continued to seek readmission, pursuing various alternatives. One such alternative, proposed for the 1985 season (after a planned one-year sojourn from the League) involved a full relocation to Orana Park, at Campbelltown in south-western Sydney, and during this period the club was run by its loyal stalwart and CEO, Frank Farrington.

This plan involved a name change for the club, to the Newtown-Campbelltown Jets. The proposal, including a new logo with the new name on the traditional royal blue jersey, was approved by the football club directors. These plans eventually failed, as the economic recession of the early 1980s prevented the club from finding a suitable buyer of the club's key asset, the Newtown Leagues Club located on Stanmore Road, Stanmore.

This left the Newtown club out of the premier Australian Rugby league competitions. In 1988, Newtown was able to sell its clubhouse, now the Cyprus Community Club of NSW, however too much time had elapsed and readmission to the top competition was not considered.

It is worth noting, however, that for a short time in their final season of 1983, Newtown called Campbelltown home. As a show of commitment to the Campbelltown-Liverpool region, with a new junior league structure ready to be implemented at the Jets' instigation for the 1984 season, Newtown played five home games of the club's final season, at Orana Park in Campbelltown, including an opening round blockbuster against 1981-82 premiers Parramatta Eels, won 54-14 by a rampant Eels combination. On August 27 Newtown played its final match in the top grade, defeating Canberra 9–6.

Ultimately, when the final deal between Newtown and the Campbelltown-Liverpool junior rugby league fell through in 1984 and it was confirmed by 1985 that Newtown would not be returning to top flight competition, the Ashfield/Lidcombe-based Western Suburbs Magpies, suspended by the League at the same time as Newtown but having had the financial resources to earn a stay of execution, negotiated a deal for the 1987 season whereby Wests would move all home games to Campbelltown and claim ownership of the vast junior league in south-western Sydney.

=== Newtown District Junior Rugby League ===
The Newtown District Junior Rugby League (NDJRL) competition ended after the ejection of the club from the NSWRL premiership in 1983. The NDJRL was absorbed mainly into the South Sydney District Junior Rugby Football League and also a small part into the St George and Canterbury-Bankstown districts. Existing junior clubs that were formerly part of the Newtown district include the Camperdown Dragons (now in South Sydney), Marrickville RSL (now in South Sydney), Earlwood Saints (now in St George) and Christian Brothers' High School, Lewisham who now only compete in school competitions.

Some notable Newtown juniors include, Johnny Raper (Camperdown Dragons), Ron Sigsworth & Phil Sigsworth (Newtown Hawks), Mark & Geoff Bugden (Marrickville), Grant & Craig Ellis (Marrickville RSL), Jeff Fenech (St. Pius Enmore, Marrickville RSL), Matt and Brad Burke (St. Josephs Newtown), Paul Osborne (Christian Bros Lewisham), Col Murphy (Newtown Hawks), Frank "Bumper" Farrell (Marrickville), Frank Hyde, Brian "Poppa" Clay (St Peters), Greg Pierce (Sydenham), Paul Akkary (St Peters), Michael Speechley and future Australian prime minister Anthony Albanese (Camperdown Dragons).

==== Referees ====
Despite being one of the smallest junior league competitions in Sydney, Newtown District Rugby League Referees Association provided a steady flow of referees to the graded ranks of the National Rugby League and the New South Wales Rugby League. Newtown Junior League was a tough, uncompromising competition so the referees quickly learned to manage difficult players and provide a controlled game.

The Newtown graded referees included: Gary Bennett, David Bowron, Lyle Buckley, Phil Cooley, Jack Danzey, Cyril Dimon, Grant Heaton, Kim Holwell, Mick Howell, Peter Lucas, Don Macdonald, Terry Murphy, Geoff Norberry, Richie Pierce and Peter Pierse.

=== Re-emergence ===
The club re-emerged in 1990 to play in the third-tier NSW competition, the Metropolitan Cup, winning the title four times (1992, 1995, 1996 and 1997). The club no longer enters a team in the NSWRL Jim Beam Cup due to it announcing in the off-season after the 2006 season of the NSWRL Jim Beam Cup that it would now only concentrate on the Premier League side. The coach during 1990, 1991 and 1992 was Brian 'Wacka' Wakefield.

In 2000, Newtown entered a team in the NSWRL Premier League, the second-tier NSW competition to the NRL. While a stand-alone club for many purposes, they have acted as a feeder for NRL teams such as South Sydney, Cronulla-Sutherland Sharks, Auckland, Sydney Roosters (until the end of the 2014 season), and as of the start of the 2015 season with the Cronulla-Sutherland Sharks.

In 2006, Newtown lost to the Parramatta Eels 20–19 in extra time in the Premier League Grand Final due to a field goal from Eels halfback Marcus Perenara after three minutes of golden point extra time.

In 2007, the club had a less fortunate season compared to 2006, failing to make the finals or even make the top 10.

On 20 August 2007, a film depicting the club, The Final Winter starring and written by former Sydney rugby league footballer Matt Nable was released in cinemas across Australia.

In 2008, Newtown again made the Grand Final of the newly formed New South Wales Cup. In an extraordinary game against the Wentworthville Magpies, the Jets scored first and led 8–4 at halftime. At full-time scores were locked at 8-8, again forcing the game into extra time, an ironic repeat of the 2006 decider. Finally after 24 minutes of extra time and dozens of attempts at field goals from both teams, captain Sean Rudder erred in kicking out on the full. This gave the Magpies good field position and allowed them to score the winning try in the corner. After the longest ever grand final match, Wentworthville won 12–8.

On 5 February 2011, Newtown played a trial game against long term rivals, the South Sydney Rabbitohs, at a revamped Redfern Oval. South Sydney won 10–4.

In 2012, Newtown just made the finals, finishing the regular season in 7th spot, but reached the Grand Final against the 8th placed Balmain Ryde-Eastwood Tigers, on their way defeating the more fancied North Sydney Bears and Canterbury-Bankstown Bulldogs. Newtown got to a 12–0 lead before Balmain came back to bring the scoreline back to 12–10 at the break. The lead changed four times in the second half before Newtown ended up winning the match 22–18. This marks the first premiership won by Newtown in the NSW Cup since 1974, breaking a 38-year drought.

On 27 August 2016, Newtown played host to Manly at Henson Park in the last regular season fixture of the year. With less than twenty minutes to play Newtown trailed Manly by 38–12. Newtown then proceeded to score 5 tries in 18 minutes to win the match 40–38. This was also the last game that Manly ever played in the NSW Cup as a stand-alone team due to their merger with Blacktown Workers commencing 2017.

On 18 September 2016, Newtown played Illawarra for a place in the grand final. With under ten minutes to go, Newtown were winning until Illawarra scored two quick tries to defeat Newtown 18–10. Illawarra went on to win their first premiership the next week.

The 2017 Intrust Super Premiership NSW season was not a good one for Newtown as they finished 11th (Second last) on the table with just six wins all year.

On 30 October 2017, it was announced that Newtown would be continuing their partnership with Cronulla for 2018, acting as the feeder club side. On 17 May 2018, Newtown announced that they had extended their partnership as Cronulla's feeder team for a further five years.

The 2018 Intrust Super Premiership NSW season was a return to form for Newtown as the club finished 3rd on the table at the end of the regular season. In the finals series, Newtown defeated defending premiers Penrith to qualify for the grand final. In the final, Newtown led Canterbury 10-0 early on but could not hold onto their advantage and were defeated 18–12 in a close game.

At the start of the 2019 Canterbury Cup NSW season, Newtown began badly losing their first four games before recovering to finish the regular season in 7th place on the table and qualify for the finals.

Newtown would then go on to make the 2019 Canterbury Cup NSW grand final after defeating Mounties, North Sydney and minor premiers St George. In the grand final against Wentworthville, Newtown won the premiership after scoring a try in the 88th minute of extra-time at the new Western Sydney Stadium to win 20–15.

The following week in the NRL State Championship final at ANZ Stadium, Newtown player Billy Magoulias set up the winning try with just five seconds of normal time remaining. With Newtown trailing the match, Magoulias kicked over the top of the Burleigh Bears' defence and Newtown player Jackson Ferris raced away to score under the posts to give Newtown a 20–16 victory.

Newtown finished the 2022 NSW Cup season as Minor Premiers but fell one game short of the grand final losing to Canterbury 28-26. On 28 September 2022, Greg Matterson who had been the head coach of Newtown for 15 seasons announced he would be stepping down from the role. On 29 September 2024, Newtown defeated fellow foundation club North Sydney 28-22 to win their 9th reserve grade title. Newtown went into the game as outsiders due to North Sydney finishing as minor premiers. In the 2025 NSW Cup season, Newtown finished fourth on the table and qualified for the finals. They were eliminated in the first week of the finals by Canberra. In the 2026 NSW Cup season, Newtown would reach the grand final after winning three sudden death games. In the final, they would lose 36-6 against Penrith.

== Home grounds ==
The first home ground of the Newtown football club was Metters Sports Ground in Erskineville or Alexandria on Ashmore Road, next to the owners, the Metters factory, which produced stoves and ovens. Across the road was Erskineville Oval. Generally the crowd attendance there was between several hundred and 3,000. At the season opening in April 1911, 9,000 spectators saw Newtown defeat Balmain 16–3. In those days the ground was often criticised for being too hard, like many others in Sydney, and the grandstand not being "imposing" enough.

In later years, Newtown was at home at Erskineville Oval and Marrickville Oval before the club moved to today's venue, Henson Park where they have remained ever since. In 1983, Newtown took five home games to Orana Park (now Campbelltown Stadium) ahead of a planned re-location to South Western Sydney in 1984 before the club was kicked out of the NSWRL.

Attendances at Henson Park are the highest in the NSW Cup. Their attendance is always announced as being 8,972, in reference to a game played at Henson Park in the Metropolitan Cup during the 1990s on a wet and miserable day. The Newtown Jets ground announcer John Lynch jokingly said through the speaker that the crowd was 8,972 even though the attendance that day was below 100 spectators. This figure has now become a part of Newtown folklore and is announced as the crowd at every home match.

== Players ==
=== Current squad ===
The current squad is made up of the following:

Newtown Jets
First team squad		Coaching staff
Johnny Gabrael; Josh Mansour; Kayal Iro; Siteni Taukamo; Billy Magoulias; Jacob Gagan; Caleb Uele; Tuku Hau Tapuha; Mawene Hiroti; Wesley Lolo; Samuel Stonestreet; Rhys Dakin; Jordin Leiu	Niwhai Puru; Daniel Atkinson; Tyler Slade; Kyle Pickering	Head coach: George Ndaira; Legend: (c) Captain(s); (vc) Vice-captain(s)

=== Team of the century ===
In 2008, the centenary year of rugby league in Australia, the Newtown Jets club named an 18-man team of the century:

- Gordon Clifford
- Phil Sigsworth
- Lionel Williamson
- Charles Russell
- Dick Poole
- Len Smith
- Brian Moore
- Bill Farnsworth
- Tony Brown
- Keith Froome
- Frank Farrell (c)
- Paddy McCue
- Paul Quinn
- Arthur Folwell
- Herb Narvo
- Graham Wilson
- Felix Ryan & Noel Mulligan

Coach: Warren Ryan

== Coaching register ==
No.	Name	Years	G	W	D	L	%	Premierships	Runners-up	Minor Premierships	Wooden spoons
1	Arthur Halloway	1923	16	4	2	10	25%	—	—	—	—
2	Albert Johnston	1923, 1925–1926	43	14	2	27	33%	—	—	—	1925
3	Bill Farnsworth	1924	8	2	5	1	25%	—	—	—	—
4	Jack Chaseling	1929	16	10	0	6	63%	—	1929	—	—
5	Charles Russell	1933	16	11	0	5	69%	1933	—	1933	—
6	Bill Kelly	1936-1937	22	11	0	11	50%		—		—
7	Frank Burge	1940	15	9	0	6	60%	—	—	—	—
8	Percy Williams	1941	14	6	2	6	43%	—	—	—	—
9	Arthur Folwell	1942–1944	108	60	4	44	58%	1943	1944	1943, 1944	—
10	Frank Farrell	1946–1951	108	60	4	44	56%	—	—	—	—
11	Frank Johnson	1952–1953	36	15	2	19	42%	—	—	—	—
12	Col Geelan	1954	21	16	2	3	76%	—	1954	1954	—
13	Dick Poole	1955–1958, 1966–1968	143	66	4	73	46%	—	1955	1955	1968
14	Charles Cahill	1959–1961	55	21	0	34	38%	—	—	—	—
15	Allan Ellis	1962–1965	74	37	3	34	50%	—	—	—	—
16	Harry Bath	1969–1972	88	33	4	51	38%	—	—	—	—
17	Jack Gibson	1973	26	16	1	9	62%	—	—	—	—
18	Clarrie Jeffries	1974–1976	66	19	4	43	29%	—	—	—	1976
19	Paul Broughton	1977–1978	36	2	1	33	6%	—	—	—	1977
20	Johnny Raper	1978	9	2	0	7	22%	—	—	—	1978
21	Warren Ryan	1979–1982	97	47	5	45	49%	—	1981	—	—
22	Brian Moore	1983	26	7	2	17	27%	—	—	—	—

== Honours and records ==
=== Team ===
- Premierships (3):
  - 1910 (drew 4–4 with Souths)
  - 1933 (defeated St George 18–5)
  - 1943 (defeated Norths 34–7)
- Runners-up (7): 1913, 1914, 1929, 1944, 1954, 1955, 1981.
- Minor premierships (6): 1910, 1933, 1943, 1944, 1954, 1955
- Finals (18): (1910, 1929, 1933, 1940, 1943, 1944, 1945, 1946, 1947, 1948, 1950, 1954, 1955, 1959, 1962, 1966, 1973, 1981)

==== Youth Team ====
- Reserve Grade (6): 1922, 1947, 1948, 1951, 1970, 1974
- President's Cup (6): 1919, 1921, 1928, 1944, 1950, 1956
- Club Championship: 1973
- Preseason Competition: 1973
- City Cup: 1937, 1942
- State Championship: 1941, 1945, 2019
- Metropolitan Cup: 1992, 1995, 1996, 1997
- NSW Cup: 2012, 2019, 2024
- Biggest wins:
  - 51–0 v Illawarra at Henson Park, 2 May 1982
  - 55–7 v St. George at SCG, 26 Aug 1944
  - 48–3 v University at Henson Park, 12 May 1937
  - 52–7 v St George at Sydney Cricket Ground, 3 Jun 1944
  - 50–6 v Manly-Warringah at Sydney Cricket Ground, 13 Jun 1955
  - 54–6 v Wentworthville at Henson Park, 11 June 2016
- Biggest defeats:
  - 65–9 v St George at Kogarah Oval, 30 Jul 1961
  - 57–6 v Manly-Warringah at Henson Park, 16 May 1976
  - 54–4 v Parramatta at Belmore Oval, 5 Jun 1983
  - 50–2 v Manly-Warringah at Brookvale Oval, 14 Aug 1977
  - 54–10 v St. George at Kogarah Oval, 24 Jul 1960
  - 44–0 v Cronulla-Sutherland at Endeavour Field, 23 Jul 1978
  - 62–18 v Parramatta at Henson Park, 20 Aug 1978
  - 60–6 v Penrith at St Marys Stadium, 25 June 2016
- Come from behind victories:

1926, Newtown vs Souths at the SCG. Souths hadn't lost a match in 1925 nor yet in 1926. Souths took an easy lead of 18–0 well into the second half. With Newtown down to 12 men (no replacement rule was in place) the matched looked like it would be a runaway victory. Newtown however managed to throw the ball around and ran out eventual victors by the smallest of margins, 25–24. The 'battlers' had defeated the 'invincibles'.

27 August 2016, Newtown played host to Manly at Henson Park in the last regular season fixture of the year. With less than twenty minutes to play Newtown trailed Manly by 38–12. Newtown then proceeded to score five tries in 18 minutes to win the match 40–38.

=== Individual ===
- Rothmans Medal winners: Geoff Bugden (1980)
- NSW Player of the Year: Len Smith (1948)
- Coach of the Year: Jack Gibson (1973), Warren Ryan (1981)
- Test Captains, Australia: Albert Johnston (1919–20), Len Smith (1948), Keith Froome (1949)
- World Cup Captains, Australia: Dick Poole (1957)
- Internationals, Australia (34): Jack Barnett, Tony Brown, Frank Cheadle, Gordon Clifford, Tedda Courtney, Bill Farnsworth, Viv Farnsworth, Frank Farrell, Arthur Folwell, Keith Froome, Col Geelan, Henry Holloway, Jack Holmes, Frank Johnson, Albert Johnston, Paddy McCue, Brian Moore, Noel Mulligan, Joe Murray, Herb Narvo, William Neill, Bill Noble, Dick Poole, Paul Quinn, Tom Raudonikis, Charlie Russell, Felix Ryan, Phil Sigsworth, Len Smith, Gary Sullivan, Dick Townsend, Jack Troy, Lionel Williamson, Graham Wilson
- First brothers to play Internationals, Bill Farnsworth and Viv Farnsworth in 1911
- Fred Daly Trophy winners (started in 1957 for the Best Clubman of each season):
- 1957 Maurie Hall
- 1958 Peter Ryan
- 1959 Kevin Considine
- 1960 Greg Ellis
- 1961 Brian McGoulrick
- 1962 Ron Hansen
- 1963 Graham Wilson
- 1964 John Oakley
- 1965 Clarrie Jeffries
- 1966 Bruce Olive
- 1967 Des O'Connor
- 1968 Rob Cowie
- 1969 Bob Keyes
- 1970 Des O'Connor
- 1971 & 1972 Lionel Williamson
- 1973 Chris Kenna
- 1974 Ron Fogarty
- 1975 Barry Cox
- 1976 Paul Hayward
- 1977 & 1978 Phil Sigsworth
- 1979 Ken Wilson
- 1980 Mark O'Brien
- 1981 Sam Fallico
- 1982 Col Murphy
- 1983 Greg Brown

=== Career records ===
Most tries

- 109 – Ray Preston

Most points

- 1,001 – Ken Wilson (25T, 447G, 28FG)

Most murder convictions

- 1 – Chris Dawson

Most appearances

- 204 – Frank Farrell (1938–1951)
- 173 – Brian Moore (1962–1973)
- 150 – Ken Wilson (1971–1974, 1979–1983)
- 142 – Tommy Nevin (1935–1945)
- 128 – Tom Ellis (1923–1933)
- 128 – Graham Wilson (1960–1967)
- 127 – Felix Ryan (1913–1923)
- 126 – Les Bull (1922–1934)
- 120 – Jack Davies (1928–1932, 1934–1938)
- 116 – Tony Brown (1956–1964)

Season records:

- Most tries: 34 – Ray Preston, 1954
- Most points: 197 – Ken Wilson (5T, 90G, 2FG), 1980

Match records:

- Most tries: 6 – Jack Troy v Eastern Suburbs, 8 Jul 1950
- Most goals: 11 – Tom Kirk
  - v St George, 3 Jun 1944
  - v St George, 26 Aug 1944
- Most points: 25 – Tom Kirk (1T, 11G) vs St George, 26 Aug 1944
- First Match (in 1908 at Wentworth Park): Lost 16–32 vs Eastern Suburbs
- First Drawn Match (in 1908): 12–12 vs Balmain (Round 3)
- First Win (in 1908): Won 16–6 vs Cumberland (Round 4)
- No Score (in 1982): 0–0 (Nil all) vs Canterbury-Bankstown, at Henson Park (first time in First Grade history no points were scored in a match)
- Lowest Score Win (in 1973): 1–0 (One-Nil) vs St. George, at SCG (first time in First Grade history only 1 point was scored in a match. Field goals were devalued to 1 point in 1971)

== Newtown Junior Rugby League ==
The Newtown District Junior Rugby League (NDJRL) competition ended after the ejection of the club from the NSWRL premiership in 1983. The NDJRL was absorbed mainly into the South Sydney District Junior Rugby Football League and also a small part into the St George and Canterbury-Bankstown districts.

=== Former clubs ===
Existing junior clubs that were formerly part of the Newtown district include:

- Camperdown Dragons (now in South Sydney)
- Marrickville RSL (now in South Sydney)
- Earlwood Saints (now in St George)
- Christian Brothers Lewisham (now only compete in school competitions)

Some extinct Newtown junior clubs include:

- St Peters
- Newtown Hawks
- Tempe Iona Warriors
- Addison Royals (Addison Road Sports Club)
- Henson Park Colts
- De La Salle Petersham
- Koorie United
- Petersham RSL
- Newtown Waratahs
- Enmore CYO
- St Anthony's, Newtown
- Erskineville United
- St Thomas's
- Newtown Police Boys' Club (folded to become Newtown Hawks)
- St Brigid's De La Salle (Marrickville)
- Hurlstone Park
- Earlwood Rebels
- Enmore United
- Marrickville Rebels
- Marrickville Bulldogs
- Sydenham United
- Camdenville
- St Pius' Enmore
- St Josephs Newtown

=== Notable Juniors ===
Some notable Newtown juniors include:

- Johnny Raper (Camperdown Dragons)
- Ron Sigsworth & Phil Sigsworth (Newtown Hawks)
- Mark & Geoff Bugden (Marrickville)
- Grant & Craig Ellis (Marrickville RSL)
- Jeff Fenech (St. Pius Enmore, Marrickville RSL)
- Matt and Brad Burke (St. Josephs Newtown)
- Paul Osborne (Christian Bros Lewisham)
- Col Murphy (Newtown Hawks)
- Frank "Bumper" Farrell (Marrickville)
- Frank Hyde
- Brian "Poppa" Clay (St Peters)
- Greg Pierce (Sydenham)
- Paul Akkary (St Peters)
- Michael Speechley

== See also ==
- New South Wales Rugby League premiership
