= List of Great Britain national rugby league team players =

This is a list of rugby league footballers who have represented for the Great Britain national rugby league team.

== Players ==
Name	Caps	Debut		Last or most recent match	
Name	Caps	Date	Opposition	Date	Opposition
Andrew Hogg	1	25 January 1908	New Zealand	25 January 1908	New Zealand
Bert Jenkins	12	25 January 1908	New Zealand	1 August 1914	New Zealand
Jim Jolley	3	25 January 1908	New Zealand	15 February 1908	New Zealand
Dai Jones	2	25 January 1908	New Zealand	8 February 1908	New Zealand
Jim Leytham	5	25 January 1908	New Zealand	13 July 1910	New Zealand
Tom Llewellyn	2	25 January 1908	New Zealand	8 February 1908	New Zealand
Asa Robinson	3	25 January 1908	New Zealand	23 January 1909	Australia
George Ruddick	3	25 January 1908	New Zealand	2 July 1910	Australia
Arthur Smith	6	25 January 1908	New Zealand	15 February 1909	Australia
Harry Taylor	3	25 January 1908	New Zealand	15 February 1908	New Zealand
Johnny Thomas	8	25 January 1908	New Zealand	8 November 1911	Australia
Silas Warwick	2	25 January 1908	New Zealand	8 February 1908	New Zealand
Harry Wilson	1	25 January 1908	New Zealand	25 January 1908	New Zealand
Johnnie Baxter	1	8 February 1908	New Zealand	8 February 1908	New Zealand
Percy Eccles	1	8 February 1908	New Zealand	8 February 1908	New Zealand
George Thomas	1	8 February 1908	New Zealand	8 February 1908	New Zealand
Billy Batten	10	15 February 1908	New Zealand	5 November 1921	Australia
John Birch	1	15 February 1908	New Zealand	15 February 1908	New Zealand
Jim Clampitt	3	15 February 1908	New Zealand	1 August 1914	New Zealand
Billy Holder	1	15 February 1908	New Zealand	15 February 1908	New Zealand
Jack Spencer	1	15 February 1908	New Zealand	15 February 1908	New Zealand
Phil Thomas	1	15 February 1908	New Zealand	15 February 1908	New Zealand
George Tyson	4	15 February 1908	New Zealand	15 February 1909	Australia
Tom White	1	15 February 1908	New Zealand	15 February 1908	New Zealand
Ernest Brookes	3	12 December 1908	Australia	15 February 1909	Australia
George Dickenson	1	12 December 1908	Australia	12 December 1908	Australia
Harry Gifford	2	12 December 1908	Australia	23 January 1909	Australia
John Higson	2	12 December 1908	Australia	23 January 1909	Australia
Bill Jukes	6	12 December 1908	Australia	30 July 1910	New Zealand
Bill Longworth	3	12 December 1908	Australia	15 February 1909	Australia
Alf Mann	2	12 December 1908	Australia	15 February 1909	Australia
James Lomas	7	23 January 1909	Australia	1 January 1912	Australia
Dick Silcock	1	23 January 1909	Australia	23 January 1909	Australia
Frank Boylen	1	15 February 1909	Australia	15 February 1909	Australia
Dick Padbury	1	15 February 1909	Australia	15 February 1909	Australia
Frank Young	1	15 February 1909	Australia	15 February 1909	Australia
Albert Avery	4	18 June 1910	Australia	1 January 1912	Australia
Ephraim Curzon	1	18 June 1910	Australia	18 June 1910	Australia
Tommy Newbould	1	18 June 1910	Australia	18 June 1910	Australia
Dick Ramsdale	8	18 June 1910	Australia	1 August 1914	New Zealand
Jim Sharrock	4	18 June 1910	Australia	8 November 1911	Australia
Billy Ward	1	18 June 1910	Australia	18 June 1910	Australia
Fred Webster	3	18 June 1910	Australia	30 July 1910	New Zealand
Herbert Kershaw	2	2 July 1910	Australia	30 July 1910	New Zealand
Joe Riley	1	2 July 1910	Australia	2 July 1910	Australia
Fred Smith	9	2 July 1910	Australia	1 August 1914	New Zealand
Billy Winstanley	5	2 July 1910	Australia	1 January 1912	Australia
Frank Shugars	1	30 July 1910	New Zealand	30 July 1910	New Zealand
Oliver Burgham	1	8 November 1911	Australia	8 November 1911	Australia
Will T. Davies	1	8 November 1911	Australia	8 November 1911	Australia
Ben Gronow	7	8 November 1911	Australia	14 August 1920	New Zealand
Fred Harrison	3	8 November 1911	Australia	1 January 1912	Australia
Joe Miller	1	8 November 1911	Australia	8 November 1911	Australia
Harold Wagstaff	12	8 November 1911	Australia	14 January 1922	Australia
Doug Clark	11	16 December 1911	Australia	14 August 1920	New Zealand
Jim Davies	2	16 December 1911	Australia	1 January 1912	Australia
Albert Jenkinson	2	16 December 1911	Australia	1 January 1912	Australia
Alf Wood	4	16 December 1911	Australia	1 August 1914	New Zealand
Tommy Woods	2	16 December 1911	Australia	1 January 1912	Australia
Jack Chilcott	3	27 June 1914	Australia	4 July 1914	Australia
Percy Coldrick	4	27 June 1914	Australia	1 August 1914	New Zealand
Billy Hall	4	27 June 1914	Australia	1 August 1914	New Zealand
Dave Holland	4	27 June 1914	Australia	1 August 1914	New Zealand
Billy Jarman	2	27 June 1914	Australia	29 June 1914	Australia
Fred Longstaff	2	27 June 1914	Australia	1 August 1914	New Zealand
Stan Moorhouse	2	27 June 1914	Australia	1 August 1914	New Zealand
Jack Robinson	2	27 June 1914	Australia	29 June 1914	Australia
Johnny Rogers	7	29 June 1914	Australia	14 January 1922	Australia
Gwyn Thomas	9	29 June 1914	Australia	14 January 1922	Australia
Frank Williams	2	29 June 1914	Australia	4 July 1914	Australia
Willie A. Davies	2	4 July 1914	Australia	1 August 1914	New Zealand
Arthur Johnson	4	4 July 1914	Australia	3 July 1920	Australia
Stuart Prosser	1	4 July 1914	Australia	4 July 1914	Australia
Jim Bacon	11	26 June 1920	Australia	15 January 1927	New Zealand
Frank Gallagher	12	26 June 1920	Australia	13 November 1926	New Zealand
Herman Hilton	7	26 June 1920	Australia	14 January 1922	Australia
Danny Hurcombe	8	26 June 1920	Australia	9 August 1924	New Zealand
Alf Milnes	2	26 June 1920	Australia	3 July 1920	Australia
Jonty Parkin	17	26 June 1920	Australia	4 January 1930	New Zealand
Billy Stone	8	26 June 1920	Australia	5 November 1921	Australia
Bobby Lloyd	1	3 July 1920	Australia	3 July 1920	Australia
Joe Cartwright	7	10 July 1920	Australia	14 January 1922	Australia
Billy Cunliffe	11	10 July 1920	Australia	2 October 1926	New Zealand
Ernest Jones	4	10 July 1920	Australia	14 August 1920	New Zealand
Arthur Skelhorn	7	10 July 1920	Australia	14 January 1922	Australia
Squire Stockwell	3	10 July 1920	Australia	5 November 1921	Australia
Evan Davies	3	31 July 1920	New Zealand	14 August 1920	New Zealand
Cyril Stacey	1	7 August 1920	New Zealand	7 August 1920	New Zealand
Joe Bowers	1	14 August 1920	New Zealand	14 August 1920	New Zealand
Jack Beames	2	1 October 1921	Australia	5 November 1921	Australia
Edgar Morgan	2	1 October 1921	Australia	5 November 1921	Australia
Jack Price	6	1 October 1921	Australia	9 August 1924	New Zealand
Johnny Greenall	1	14 January 1922	Australia	14 January 1922	Australia
Jim Owen	1	14 January 1922	Australia	14 January 1922	Australia
Bob Taylor	2	14 January 1922	Australia	2 October 1926	New Zealand
Jack Bennett	7	23 June 1924	Australia	2 October 1926	New Zealand
Bill Burgess Sr.	16	23 June 1924	Australia	4 January 1930	Australia
Charlie Carr	7	23 June 1924	Australia	15 January 1927	New Zealand
Joe Darwell	5	23 June 1924	Australia	6 August 1924	New Zealand
Tommy Howley	6	23 June 1924	Australia	9 August 1924	New Zealand
Johnny Ring	2	23 June 1924	Australia	2 October 1926	New Zealand
Sid Rix	9	23 June 1924	Australia	15 January 1927	New Zealand
Jim Sullivan	28	23 June 1924	Australia	15 April 1934	France
Albert Brough	2	28 June 1924	Australia	9 August 1924	New Zealand
Frank Evans	4	28 June 1924	Australia	9 August 1924	New Zealand
Joe Thompson	12	28 June 1924	Australia	20 August 1932	New Zealand
Billy Bentham	2	2 August 1924	New Zealand	6 August 1924	New Zealand
Ernest Knapman	1	2 August 1924	New Zealand	2 August 1924	New Zealand
Walter Mooney	2	2 August 1924	New Zealand	6 August 1924	New Zealand
Harold Bowman	8	6 August 1924	New Zealand	5 October 1929	Australia
Charlie Pollard	1	6 August 1924	New Zealand	6 August 1924	New Zealand
Jack Evans	3	2 October 1926	New Zealand	15 January 1927	New Zealand
Billo Rees	11	2 October 1926	New Zealand	15 January 1930	Australia
Dai Rees	1	2 October 1926	New Zealand	2 October 1926	New Zealand
Les Fairclough	6	13 November 1926	New Zealand	5 October 1929	Australia
Alec Fildes	15	13 November 1926	New Zealand	20 August 1932	New Zealand
Bert Smith	2	13 November 1926	New Zealand	15 January 1927	New Zealand
Arthur Thomas	4	13 November 1926	New Zealand	15 January 1930	Australia
Jim Wallace	1	13 November 1926	New Zealand	13 November 1926	New Zealand
Bryn Evans	11	15 January 1927	New Zealand	31 December 1933	Australia
Jack Gore	1	15 January 1927	New Zealand	15 January 1927	New Zealand
Tom Askin	6	23 June 1928	Australia	25 August 1928	New Zealand
Nat Bentham	10	23 June 1928	Australia	15 January 1930	Australia
Jim Brough	6	23 June 1928	Australia	4 July 1936	Australia
Alf Ellaby	14	23 June 1928	Australia	15 April 1934	France
Bill Horton	15	23 June 1928	Australia	31 December 1933	Australia
Joe Oliver	5	23 June 1928	Australia	31 December 1933	Australia
Bob Sloman	5	23 June 1928	Australia	18 August 1928	New Zealand
Emlyn Gwynne	3	21 July 1928	Australia	5 October 1929	Australia
Frank Bowen	3	4 August 1928	New Zealand	25 August 1928	New Zealand
Alf Frodsham	3	18 August 1928	New Zealand	5 October 1929	Australia
Billy Dingsdale	3	5 October 1929	Australia	11 November 1933	Australia
Jack Feetham	8	5 October 1929	Australia	16 December 1933	Australia
Roy Kinnear	1	5 October 1929	Australia	5 October 1929	Australia
Alf Middleton	1	5 October 1929	Australia	5 October 1929	Australia
Tom Rees	1	5 October 1929	Australia	5 October 1929	Australia
Arthur Atkinson	12	9 November 1929	Australia	29 June 1936	Australia
Fred Butters	2	9 November 1929	Australia	4 January 1930	Australia
Martin Hodgson	16	9 November 1929	Australia	16 October 1937	Australia
Dai Jenkins	1	9 November 1929	Australia	9 November 1929	Australia
Stanley Smith	13	9 November 1929	Australia	15 April 1934	France
Hector Halsall	1	4 January 1930	Australia	4 January 1930	Australia
Jack Oster	1	4 January 1930	Australia	4 January 1930	Australia
Tom Blinkhorn	1	15 January 1930	Australia	15 January 1930	Australia
Stan Brogden	17	15 January 1930	Australia	18 December 1937	Australia
Hector Crowther	1	15 January 1930	Australia	15 January 1930	Australia
Billy Williams	2	15 January 1930	Australia	16 July 1932	Australia
Harold Young	1	15 January 1930	Australia	15 January 1930	Australia
Ernest Pollard	2	6 June 1932	Australia	18 June 1932	Australia
Nat Silcock Sr.	15	6 June 1932	Australia	13 November 1937	Australia
Les L. White	8	6 June 1932	Australia	31 December 1933	Australia
Les Adams	1	18 June 1932	Australia	18 June 1932	Australia
Gus Risman	18	16 July 1932	Australia	20 July 1946	Australia
John Lowe	1	30 July 1932	New Zealand	30 July 1932	New Zealand
Barney Hudson	9	20 August 1932	New Zealand	18 December 1937	Australia
Joe Wright	2	20 August 1932	New Zealand	15 April 1934	France
Billy J. Davies	1	7 October 1933	Australia	7 October 1933	Australia
Jack Miller	6	7 October 1933	Australia	15 August 1936	New Zealand
Jack Woods	1	11 November 1933	Australia	11 November 1933	Australia
Tommy Armitt	8	16 December 1933	Australia	18 December 1937	Australia
Emlyn Jenkins	11	16 December 1933	Australia	18 December 1937	Australia
Billy Watkins	7	16 December 1933	Australia	18 December 1937	Australia
Norman Fender	1	31 December 1933	Australia	31 December 1933	Australia
Ken Jubb	3	31 December 1933	Australia	18 December 1937	Australia
Jack Morley	3	31 December 1933	Australia	16 October 1937	Australia
Ted Sadler	1	31 December 1933	Australia	31 December 1933	Australia
Tommy Thompson	1	31 December 1933	Australia	31 December 1933	Australia
Paddy Dalton	2	13 January 1934	Australia	15 April 1934	France
Fred Harris	1	13 January 1934	Australia	13 January 1934	Australia
Billy Little	2	13 January 1934	Australia	15 April 1934	France
George Saddington	2	13 January 1934	Australia	15 April 1934	France
Alec Troup	1	13 January 1934	Australia	15 August 1936	New Zealand
William Watson	2	13 January 1934	Australia	15 April 1934	France
Albert Worrall	1	13 January 1934	Australia	13 January 1934	Australia
Albert Bailey	1	15 April 1934	France	15 April 1934	France
Billy Belshaw	8	29 June 1936	Australia	18 December 1937	Australia
Harry Beverley	6	29 June 1936	Australia	18 December 1937	Australia
Alan Edwards	7	29 June 1936	Australia	18 December 1937	Australia
Harry Field	3	29 June 1936	Australia	15 August 1936	New Zealand
Tommy McCue	6	29 June 1936	Australia	10 August 1946	New Zealand
Harry Woods	6	29 June 1936	Australia	16 October 1937	Australia
Jack Arkwright	6	4 July 1936	Australia	18 December 1937	Australia
Jim Croston	1	16 October 1937	Australia	16 October 1937	Australia
Bernard Cunniffe	1	16 October 1937	Australia	16 October 1937	Australia
Alec Higgins	2	13 November 1937	Australia	18 December 1937	Australia
Dai Prosser	1	18 December 1937	Australia	18 December 1937	Australia
Eric Batten	4	17 June 1946	Australia	8 November 1947	New Zealand
Joe Egan	14	17 June 1946	Australia	12 August 1950	New Zealand
Ken Gee	17	17 June 1946	Australia	25 November 1951	France
Willie Horne	9	17 June 1946	Australia	24 May 1953	France
Albert Johnson	6	17 June 1946	Australia	20 December 1947	New Zealand
Jack Kitching	1	17 June 1946	Australia	17 June 1946	Australia
Ike Owens	4	17 June 1946	Australia	10 August 1946	New Zealand
Doug Phillips	4	17 June 1946	Australia	22 July 1950	Australia
Ernest Ward	21	17 June 1946	Australia	13 December 1952	Australia
Frank Whitcombe	2	17 June 1946	Australia	6 July 1946	Australia
Les White	6	17 June 1946	Australia	20 December 1947	New Zealand
Arthur Bassett	2	6 July 1946	Australia	20 July 1946	Australia
Ted Ward	3	6 July 1946	Australia	10 August 1946	New Zealand
George Curran	6	20 July 1946	Australia	29 January 1949	Australia
Willie T. H. Davies	3	10 August 1946	New Zealand	8 November 1947	New Zealand
Trevor Foster	3	10 August 1946	New Zealand	6 November 1948	Australia
Joe Jones	1	10 August 1946	New Zealand	10 August 1946	New Zealand
Bryn Knowelden	1	10 August 1946	New Zealand	10 August 1946	New Zealand
Bob Nicholson	3	10 August 1946	New Zealand	6 November 1948	Australia
Len Aston	3	4 October 1947	New Zealand	20 December 1947	New Zealand
Tommy Bradshaw	6	4 October 1947	New Zealand	12 August 1950	New Zealand
Alec Dockar	1	4 October 1947	New Zealand	4 October 1947	New Zealand
Elwyn Gwyther	6	4 October 1947	New Zealand	6 October 1951	New Zealand
Jimmy Ledgard	11	4 October 1947	New Zealand	13 November 1954	France
Gordon Ratcliffe	3	4 October 1947	New Zealand	1 July 1950	Australia
Jim Stott	1	4 October 1947	New Zealand	4 October 1947	New Zealand
Les Thomas	1	4 October 1947	New Zealand	4 October 1947	New Zealand
Ernest Ashcroft	11	8 November 1947	New Zealand	14 August 1954	New Zealand
Dai Jenkins	1	8 November 1947	New Zealand	8 November 1947	New Zealand
Harold Palin	2	8 November 1947	New Zealand	20 December 1947	New Zealand
Roy Francis	1	20 December 1947	New Zealand	20 December 1947	New Zealand
Martin Ryan	4	20 December 1947	New Zealand	12 June 1950	Australia
Gerry Helme	12	9 October 1948	Australia	13 November 1954	France
John Lawrenson	3	9 October 1948	Australia	29 January 1949	Australia
Stan McCormick	4	9 October 1948	Australia	24 May 1953	France
Albert Pimblett	3	9 October 1948	Australia	29 January 1949	Australia
Dave Valentine	16	9 October 1948	Australia	13 November 1954	France
Dickie Williams	13	6 November 1948	Australia	27 April 1954	France
Jim Featherstone	6	29 January 1949	Australia	13 December 1952	Australia
Bill Hudson	1	29 January 1949	Australia	29 January 1949	Australia
Fred Higgins	6	12 June 1950	Australia	15 December 1951	New Zealand
Jack Hilton	4	12 June 1950	Australia	12 August 1950	New Zealand
Bob Ryan	5	12 June 1950	Australia	4 October 1952	Australia
Harry Street	4	12 June 1950	Australia	12 August 1950	New Zealand
Tom Danby	3	1 July 1950	Australia	12 August 1950	New Zealand
Harry Murphy	1	1 July 1950	Australia	1 July 1950	Australia
Jack Cunliffe	4	22 July 1950	Australia	12 June 1954	Australia
Albert Pepperell	2	29 July 1950	New Zealand	15 December 1951	New Zealand
Roy Pollard	1	29 July 1950	New Zealand	29 July 1950	New Zealand
Ken Traill	9	29 July 1950	New Zealand	14 August 1954	New Zealand
Billy Blan	3	6 October 1951	New Zealand	15 December 1951	New Zealand
Alf Burnell	3	6 October 1951	New Zealand	14 August 1954	New Zealand
Dick Cracknell	3	6 October 1951	New Zealand	22 May 1952	France
Doug Greenall	8	6 October 1951	New Zealand	31 July 1954	New Zealand
Vince McKeating	2	6 October 1951	New Zealand	10 November 1951	New Zealand
Cecil Thompson	2	6 October 1951	New Zealand	10 November 1951	New Zealand
George Wilson	3	6 October 1951	New Zealand	15 December 1951	New Zealand
Alan Prescott	31	10 November 1951	New Zealand	5 July 1958	Australia
Frank Barton	2	15 December 1951	New Zealand	22 May 1952	France
Jack Evans	6	15 December 1951	New Zealand	24 May 1953	France
Tom McKinney	15	15 December 1951	New Zealand	25 June 1957	New Zealand
Drew Turnbull	2	15 December 1951	New Zealand	11 December 1955	France
Frank Castle	6	22 May 1952	France	12 June 1954	Australia
Billy Ivison	1	22 May 1952	France	22 May 1952	France
Charlie Pawsey	10	22 May 1952	France	14 August 1954	New Zealand
Ray Price	10	22 May 1952	France	10 April 1957	France
Nat Silcock Jr.	4	22 May 1952	France	17 July 1954	Australia
Ted Toohey	4	22 May 1952	France	13 December 1952	Australia
Alvin Ackerley	2	4 October 1952	Australia	26 July 1958	New Zealand
Arthur Daniels	3	4 October 1952	Australia	12 November 1955	New Zealand
Ron Ryder	1	4 October 1952	Australia	4 October 1952	Australia
Dai Bevan	2	13 December 1952	Australia	24 May 1953	France
Billy Banks	2	24 May 1953	France	27 April 1954	France
Albert Naughton	4	24 May 1953	France	11 April 1956	France
George Parsons	1	24 May 1953	France	24 May 1953	France
Ted Slevin	2	24 May 1953	France	27 April 1954	France
Billy Boston	32	27 April 1954	France	3 April 1963	France
Jim Bowden	4	27 April 1954	France	14 August 1954	New Zealand
Brian Briggs	3	27 April 1954	France	11 April 1956	France
Ted Cahill	1	27 April 1954	France	27 April 1954	France
Phil Jackson	29	27 April 1954	France	26 July 1958	New Zealand
Lewis Jones	17	27 April 1954	France	25 June 1957	New Zealand
Jack Wilkinson	14	12 June 1954	Australia	11 August 1962	New Zealand
Terry O'Grady	6	3 July 1954	Australia	30 September 1961	New Zealand
Geoff Gunney	11	24 July 1954	New Zealand	23 January 1965	France
Tommy Harris	25	24 July 1954	New Zealand	24 September 1960	New Zealand
Gordon Brown	7	31 October 1954	Australia	17 December 1955	New Zealand
Bob Coverdale	4	31 October 1954	Australia	13 November 1954	France
Frank Kitchen	2	31 October 1954	Australia	11 November 1954	New Zealand
Don Robinson	11	31 October 1954	Australia	26 March 1960	France
David Rose	4	31 October 1954	Australia	13 November 1954	France
Sam Smith	5	31 October 1954	Australia	11 April 1956	France
Mick Sullivan	48	31 October 1954	Australia	9 November 1963	Australia
John Thorley	5	31 October 1954	Australia	11 April 1956	France
Basil Watts	5	31 October 1954	Australia	12 November 1955	New Zealand
Peter Foster	4	8 October 1955	New Zealand	17 December 1955	New Zealand
Jack Grundy	13	8 October 1955	New Zealand	25 June 1957	New Zealand
Glyn Moses	9	8 October 1955	New Zealand	25 June 1957	New Zealand
Jeff Stevenson	20	8 October 1955	New Zealand	26 March 1960	France
Alan Davies	22	11 December 1955	France	11 December 1960	France
Derrick Schofield	2	11 December 1955	France	17 December 1955	New Zealand
Terry Hollindrake	1	17 December 1955	New Zealand	17 December 1955	New Zealand
Don Fox	2	11 April 1956	France	30 November 1963	Australia
Gordon Haynes	1	11 April 1956	France	11 April 1956	France
Keith Holliday	1	11 April 1956	France	11 April 1956	France
Bob Kelly	1	11 April 1956	France	11 April 1956	France
John McKeown	1	11 April 1956	France	11 April 1956	France
Ike Southward	12	11 April 1956	France	28 July 1962	New Zealand
Edgar Dawson	1	17 November 1956	Australia	17 November 1956	Australia
Frank Mortimer	2	17 November 1956	Australia	1 December 1956	Australia
Brian Shaw	6	17 November 1956	Australia	28 January 1961	France
Derek Turner	24	1 December 1956	Australia	2 December 1962	France
Syd Little	10	15 December 1956	Australia	2 March 1958	France
Dave Bolton	23	26 January 1957	France	30 November 1963	Australia
Eric Ashton	26	17 June 1957	Australia	9 November 1963	Australia
Johnny Whiteley	15	17 June 1957	Australia	17 February 1962	France
Austin Rhodes	4	25 June 1957	New Zealand	30 September 1961	New Zealand
Bernard Ganley	3	3 November 1957	France	2 March 1958	France
Dennis Goodwin	5	3 November 1957	France	9 August 1958	New Zealand
Ken Jackson	2	3 November 1957	France	23 November 1957	France
Stan Owen	1	2 March 1958	France	2 March 1958	France
Brian Edgar	11	14 June 1958	Australia	23 July 1966	Australia
Eric Fraser	16	14 June 1958	Australia	4 November 1961	New Zealand
Mick Martyn	2	14 June 1958	Australia	17 October 1959	Australia
Alex Murphy	27	14 June 1958	Australia	16 October 1971	New Zealand
Abe Terry	11	14 June 1958	Australia	17 February 1962	France
Jim Challinor	3	5 July 1958	Australia	1 October 1960	France
Dick Huddart	16	5 July 1958	Australia	30 November 1963	Australia
Vince Karalius	12	5 July 1958	Australia	9 November 1963	Australia
Brian McTigue	25	5 July 1958	Australia	3 April 1963	France
Frank Carlton	2	26 July 1958	New Zealand	28 July 1962	New Zealand
Frank Pitchford	2	26 July 1958	New Zealand	11 March 1962	France
Don Vines	3	14 March 1959	France	21 November 1959	Australia
Neil Fox	29	5 April 1959	France	2 February 1969	France
Brian Gabbitas	1	5 April 1959	France	5 April 1959	France
Charlie Winslade	1	5 April 1959	France	5 April 1959	France
Frank Dyson	1	21 November 1959	Australia	21 November 1959	Australia
Gerry Round	8	12 December 1959	Australia	11 August 1962	New Zealand
Norman Cherrington	1	6 March 1960	France	6 March 1960	France
Jim Drake	1	6 March 1960	France	6 March 1960	France
Bobby Greenhough	1	24 September 1960	New Zealand	24 September 1960	New Zealand
Frank Myler	24	24 September 1960	New Zealand	7 November 1970	Australia
John Shaw	5	1 October 1960	France	11 August 1962	New Zealand
John Barton	2	11 December 1960	France	30 September 1961	New Zealand
Derek Hallas	2	28 January 1961	France	30 September 1961	New Zealand
John Stopford	12	28 January 1961	France	25 June 1966	Australia
Bill Sayer	7	30 September 1961	New Zealand	16 October 1963	Australia
Bob Dagnall	4	21 October 1961	New Zealand	23 January 1965	France
Roy Evans	4	21 October 1961	New Zealand	28 July 1962	New Zealand
Norman Herbert	6	4 November 1961	New Zealand	28 July 1962	New Zealand
Terry Clawson	14	17 February 1962	France	10 August 1974	New Zealand
Malcolm Dixon	2	17 February 1962	France	18 March 1964	France
Barry Simms	1	17 February 1962	France	17 February 1962	France
Laurie Gilfedder	5	30 June 1962	Australia	3 April 1963	France
Harold Poynton	3	30 June 1962	Australia	11 August 1962	New Zealand
Peter Small	1	11 August 1962	New Zealand	11 August 1962	New Zealand
Ken Bowman	3	2 December 1962	France	16 October 1963	Australia
Bill Burgess Jr.	14	2 December 1962	France	2 February 1969	France
Bill Drake	1	2 December 1962	France	2 December 1962	France
Peter Flanagan	14	2 December 1962	France	6 June 1970	Australia
Ken Gowers	14	2 December 1962	France	20 August 1966	New Zealand
Billy Martin	1	2 December 1962	France	2 December 1962	France
Tommy Smales	8	2 December 1962	France	6 November 1965	New Zealand
Ron Morgan	2	3 April 1963	France	9 November 1963	Australia
Bill Robinson	2	3 April 1963	France	9 November 1963	Australia
Norman Field	1	16 October 1963	Australia	16 October 1963	Australia
Jim Measures	2	16 October 1963	Australia	9 November 1963	Australia
John Tembey	2	16 October 1963	Australia	6 December 1964	France
Brian Tyson	3	16 October 1963	Australia	22 January 1967	France
Len McIntyre	1	9 November 1963	Australia	9 November 1963	Australia
Cliff Watson	30	9 November 1963	Australia	17 March 1971	France
Alan Buckley	7	30 November 1963	Australia	6 August 1966	New Zealand
Frank Collier	2	30 November 1963	Australia	8 March 1964	France
Keith Holden	1	30 November 1963	Australia	30 November 1963	Australia
Ken Roberts	10	30 November 1963	Australia	20 August 1966	New Zealand
Geoff Smith	3	30 November 1963	Australia	18 March 1964	France
Johnny Ward	4	30 November 1963	Australia	25 July 1970	New Zealand
Bill Bryant	5	8 March 1964	France	4 March 1967	France
Alan Hardisty	12	8 March 1964	France	4 July 1970	Australia
Dennis Hartley	11	8 March 1964	France	7 Nov 1970	Australia
Dave Parker	2	8 March 1964	France	18 March 1964	France
Geoff Shelton	7	8 March 1964	France	5 March 1966	France
Ray Ashby	2	18 March 1964	France	23 January 1965	France
Gary Jordan	2	18 March 1964	France	9 December 1967	Australia
Dick Gemmell	3	6 December 1964	France	2 February 1969	France
Bill Holliday	10	6 December 1964	France	9 December 1967	Australia
Berwyn Jones	3	6 December 1964	France	16 January 1966	France
Harry Poole	3	6 December 1964	France	20 August 1966	New Zealand
John Warlow	7	6 December 1964	France	25 September 1971	New Zealand
Doug Walton	1	23 January 1965	France	23 January 1965	France
Danny Gardiner	1	25 September 1965	New Zealand	25 September 1965	New Zealand
Mervyn Hicks	1	25 September 1965	New Zealand	25 September 1965	New Zealand
George Kemel	2	25 September 1965	New Zealand	23 October 1965	New Zealand
Phil Kitchin	1	25 September 1965	New Zealand	25 September 1965	New Zealand
Charlie Renilson	8	25 September 1965	New Zealand	30 November 1968	France
Ken Senior	2	25 September 1965	New Zealand	4 March 1967	France
Geoff Wriglesworth	5	25 September 1965	New Zealand	20 August 1966	New Zealand
Paul Charlton	19	23 October 1965	New Zealand	10 August 1974	New Zealand
Johnny Rae	1	23 October 1965	New Zealand	23 October 1965	New Zealand
Bill Ramsey	8	23 October 1965	New Zealand	10 August 1974	New Zealand
Colin Clarke	7	6 November 1965	New Zealand	1 December 1973	Australia
Ken Eyre	1	6 November 1965	New Zealand	6 November 1965	New Zealand
Gordon Lewis	1	6 November 1965	New Zealand	6 November 1965	New Zealand
Dave Robinson	13	6 November 1965	New Zealand	6 June 1970	Australia
Cliff Hill	1	16 January 1966	France	16 January 1966	France
John Mantle	13	16 January 1966	France	24 November 1973	Australia
Charlie Bott	1	5 March 1966	France	5 March 1966	France
Roger Millward	29	5 March 1966	France	18 November 1978	Australia
Bernard Prior	1	5 March 1966	France	5 March 1966	France
Tommy Bishop	15	25 June 1966	Australia	2 February 1969	France
Ian Brooke	13	25 June 1966	Australia	8 June 1968	New Zealand
Arthur Keegan	9	25 June 1966	Australia	2 February 1969	France
Willie Aspinall	1	20 August 1966	New Zealand	20 August 1966	New Zealand
Terry Fogerty	3	20 August 1966	New Zealand	17 February 1974	France
Ian Hare	1	22 January 1967	France	22 January 1967	France
Mick Harrison	7	22 January 1967	France	1 December 1973	Australia
Keith Hepworth	11	22 January 1967	France	7 November 1970	Australia
Bob Irving	11	22 January 1967	France	11 November 1972	Australia
Clive Sullivan	17	22 January 1967	France	1 December 1973	Australia
Don Close	1	4 March 1967	France	4 March 1967	France
Malcolm Price	2	21 October 1967	Australia	9 December 1967	Australia
Chris Young	5	21 October 1967	Australia	2 March 1968	France
Frank Foster	1	3 November 1967	Australia	3 November 1967	Australia
Bill Francis	4	3 November 1967	Australia	25 June 1977	Australia
Alan Burwell	8	9 December 1967	Australia	2 February 1969	France
Rob Valentine	1	9 December 1967	Australia	9 December 1967	Australia
Mick Clark	5	11 February 1968	France	8 June 1968	New Zealand
Derek Edwards	5	11 February 1968	France	6 November 1971	New Zealand
Ray French	4	11 February 1968	France	8 June 1968	New Zealand
Arnie Morgan	4	11 February 1968	France	8 June 1968	New Zealand
Bev Risman	5	11 February 1968	France	8 June 1968	New Zealand
Kevin Ashcroft	6	25 May 1968	Australia	27 July 1974	New Zealand
Bob Haigh	6	25 May 1968	Australia	16 October 1971	New Zealand
Mick Shoebottom	12	25 May 1968	Australia	7 February 1971	France
John Atkinson	26	2 June 1968	France	15 November 1980	New Zealand
Billy Davies	1	30 November 1968	France	30 November 1968	France
Colin Dixon	14	30 November 1968	France	10 August 1974	New Zealand
Ken Parr	1	30 November 1968	France	30 November 1968	France
Ray Batten	3	2 February 1969	France	24 November 1973	Australia
Dave Chisnall	2	6 June 1970	Australia	31 October 1970	New Zealand
Doug Laughton	15	6 June 1970	Australia	16 June 1979	Australia
Terry Price	1	6 June 1970	Australia	6 June 1970	Australia
Malcolm Reilly	9	6 June 1970	Australia	7 November 1970	Australia
Tony Fisher	11	20 June 1970	Australia	18 November 1978	Australia
Syd Hynes	13	20 June 1970	Australia	1 December 1973	Australia
Alan Smith	10	20 June 1970	Australia	1 December 1973	Australia
Jimmy Thompson	21	20 June 1970	Australia	21 October 1978	Australia
Barry Seabourne	1	11 July 1970	New Zealand	11 July 1970	New Zealand
Ray Dutton	6	19 July 1970	New Zealand	7 November 1970	Australia
Chris Hesketh	23	25 July 1970	New Zealand	10 August 1974	New Zealand
Phil Lowe	12	25 July 1970	New Zealand	18 November 1978	Australia
Keri Jones	2	28 October 1970	France	31 October 1970	New Zealand
Billy Benyon	6	7 February 1971	France	12 March 1972	France
David Hill	1	7 February 1971	France	7 February 1971	France
David Jeanes	8	7 February 1971	France	11 November 1972	Australia
Derek Whitehead	3	17 March 1971	France	25 September 1971	New Zealand
Mike Coulman	3	17 March 1971	France	16 October 1971	New Zealand
Steve Nash	24	17 March 1971	France	30 October 1982	Australia
David Watkins	6	17 March 1971	France	15 June 1974	Australia
Bill Ashurst	3	25 September 1971	New Zealand	12 March 1972	France
Les Jones	1	25 September 1971	New Zealand	25 September 1971	New Zealand
Tony Karalius	5	25 September 1971	New Zealand	4 November 1972	New Zealand
Mick Stephenson	6	16 October 1971	New Zealand	11 November 1972	Australia
Joe Walsh	1	16 October 1971	New Zealand	16 October 1971	New Zealand
Tony Halmshaw	1	6 November 1971	New Zealand	6 November 1971	New Zealand
John Holmes	20	6 November 1971	New Zealand	20 November 1982	Australia
Ken Loxton	1	6 November 1971	New Zealand	6 November 1971	New Zealand
George Nicholls	29	6 November 1971	New Zealand	11 August 1979	New Zealand
Dennis O'Neill	3	6 November 1971	New Zealand	1 November 1972	France
Ken Kelly	4	6 February 1972	France	20 November 1982	Australia
John Walsh	5	12 March 1972	France	11 November 1972	Australia
Brian Lockwood	9	29 October 1972	Australia	21 July 1979	New Zealand
David Redfearn	7	4 November 1972	New Zealand	10 August 1974	New Zealand
David Topliss	4	3 November 1973	Australia	28 November 1982	Australia
David Eckersley	4	24 November 1973	Australia	6 July 1974	Australia
Alan Bates	4	20 January 1974	France	10 August 1974	New Zealand
John Keith Bridges	3	20 January 1974	France	15 June 1974	Australia
Keith Fielding	4	20 January 1974	France	18 June 1977	Australia
Ken Gill	7	20 January 1974	France	25 June 1977	Australia
John Gray	8	20 January 1974	France	10 August 1974	New Zealand
David Willicombe	3	20 January 1974	France	10 August 1974	New Zealand
John Bevan	6	15 June 1974	Australia	18 November 1978	Australia
Jim Mills	6	15 June 1974	Australia	16 June 1979	Australia
Eric Chisnall	4	6 July 1974	Australia	10 August 1974	New Zealand
Les Dyl	11	6 July 1974	Australia	30 October 1982	Australia
Steve Norton	12	6 July 1974	Australia	30 October 1982	Australia
Maurice Richards	2	20 July 1974	Australia	4 August 1974	New Zealand
Paul Rose	5	20 July 1974	Australia	28 November 1982	Australia
Eddie Bowman	4	5 June 1977	France	25 June 1977	Australia
Len Casey	14	5 June 1977	France	6 March 1983	France
George Fairbairn	17	5 June 1977	France	28 November 1982	Australia
Phil Hogan	9	5 June 1977	France	11 August 1979	New Zealand
Steve Pitchford	4	5 June 1977	France	25 June 1977	Australia
David Ward	12	5 June 1977	France	30 October 1982	Australia
Stuart Wright	7	5 June 1977	France	18 November 1978	Australia
Peter Smith	6	18 June 1977	Australia	17 February 1984	France
Keith Elwell	3	25 June 1977	Australia	15 November 1980	New Zealand
Eddie Cunningham	1	21 October 1978	Australia	21 October 1978	Australia
Eric Hughes	8	21 October 1978	Australia	30 October 1982	Australia
John Joyner	16	5 November 1978	Australia	28 July 1984	New Zealand
Vince Farrar	1	18 November 1978	Australia	18 November 1978	Australia
David Barends	2	16 June 1979	Australia	30 June 1979	Australia
Steve Evans	10	16 June 1979	Australia	28 November 1982	Australia
Roy Mathias	1	16 June 1979	Australia	16 June 1979	Australia
Trevor Skerrett	10	16 June 1979	Australia	20 November 1982	Australia
Gary Stephens	5	16 June 1979	Australia	11 August 1979	New Zealand
John Woods	11	16 June 1979	Australia	24 October 1987	Papua New Guinea
Mick Adams	13	30 June 1979	Australia	5 August 1984	Papua New Guinea
Jeff Grayshon	13	30 June 1979	Australia	9 November 1985	New Zealand
David Watkinson	13	30 June 1979	Australia	22 November 1986	Australia
Alan Redfearn	1	14 July 1979	Australia	14 July 1979	Australia
Mike Smith	11	21 July 1979	New Zealand	14 July 1984	New Zealand
Keith Bentley	1	18 October 1980	New Zealand	18 October 1980	New Zealand
Chris Camilleri	2	18 October 1980	New Zealand	2 November 1980	New Zealand
Kevin Dick	2	18 October 1980	New Zealand	2 November 1980	New Zealand
Les Gorley	5	18 October 1980	New Zealand	30 October 1982	Australia
Steve Hartley	3	18 October 1980	New Zealand	20 December 1981	France
Roy Holdstock	2	18 October 1980	New Zealand	2 November 1980	New Zealand
Harry Pinner	7	18 October 1980	New Zealand	22 November 1986	Australia
Des Drummond	24	2 November 1980	New Zealand	24 January 1988	France
Glyn Shaw	1	2 November 1980	New Zealand	2 November 1980	New Zealand
Mick Burke	15	15 November 1980	New Zealand	16 February 1986	France
Peter Gorley	3	15 November 1980	New Zealand	20 December 1981	France
Arnie Walker	1	15 November 1980	New Zealand	15 November 1980	New Zealand
Henderson Gill	15	6 December 1981	France	17 July 1988	New Zealand
Andy Gregory	26	6 December 1981	France	12 June 1992	Australia
Eddie Szymala	2	6 December 1981	France	20 December 1981	France
Lee Crooks	19	30 October 1982	Australia	20 March 1994	France
David Heron	2	30 October 1982	Australia	20 November 1982	Australia
Chris Burton	9	20 November 1982	Australia	8 February 1987	France
John Dalgreen	1	20 November 1982	Australia	20 November 1982	Australia
Bob Eccles	1	20 November 1982	Australia	20 November 1982	Australia
Keith Mumby	11	20 November 1982	Australia	5 August 1984	Papua New Guinea
Alan Rathbone	5	20 November 1982	Australia	17 March 1985	France
David Stephenson	10	20 November 1982	Australia	17 July 1988	New Zealand
Neil Courtney	1	28 November 1982	Australia	28 November 1982	Australia
Mike Crane	1	28 November 1982	Australia	28 November 1982	Australia
Brian Noble	11	28 November 1982	Australia	5 August 1984	Papua New Guinea
Mike O'Neill	3	28 November 1982	Australia	6 March 1983	France
Ronnie Duane	3	20 February 1983	France	29 January 1984	France
Terry Flanagan	4	20 February 1983	France	5 August 1984	Papua New Guinea
Andy Goodway	23	20 February 1983	France	18 March 1990	France
Joe Lydon	30	20 February 1983	France	24 October 1992	Australia
Tony Myler	14	20 February 1983	France	22 November 1986	Australia
David Cairns	2	29 January 1984	France	17 February 1984	France
Garry Clark	3	29 January 1984	France	17 March 1985	France
Des Foy	3	29 January 1984	France	17 March 1985	France
David Hall	2	29 January 1984	France	17 February 1984	France
Ellery Hanley	36	29 January 1984	France	7 March 1993	France
David Hobbs	12	29 January 1984	France	28 October 1989	New Zealand
Keith Rayne	4	29 January 1984	France	5 August 1984	Papua New Guinea
Mick Worrall	3	29 January 1984	France	26 June 1984	Australia
John Basnett	2	17 February 1984	France	22 November 1986	Australia
Dick Jasiewicz	1	17 February 1984	France	17 February 1984	France
Garry Schofield	46	17 February 1984	France	20 November 1994	Australia
Kevin Ward	17	17 February 1984	France	24 October 1992	Australia
Neil Holding	4	9 June 1984	Australia	14 July 1984	New Zealand
Brian Case	7	7 July 1984	Australia	9 July 1988	Australia
Kevin Beardmore	14	22 July 1984	New Zealand	7 April 1990	France
Steve Donlan	2	28 July 1984	New Zealand	5 August 1984	Papua New Guinea
Wayne Proctor	1	5 August 1984	Papua New Guinea	5 August 1984	Papua New Guinea
David Creasser	4	1 March 1985	France	24 January 1988	France
Andy Dannatt	3	1 March 1985	France	16 February 1991	France
Roy Dickinson	2	1 March 1985	France	17 March 1985	France
Gary Divorty	2	1 March 1985	France	17 March 1985	France
Shaun Edwards	36	1 March 1985	France	20 November 1994	Australia
Deryck Fox	14	1 March 1985	France	24 October 1992	Australia
Carl Gibson	11	1 March 1985	France	27 January 1991	France
Vince Gribbin	1	1 March 1985	France	1 March 1985	France
Barry Ledger	2	1 March 1985	France	8 November 1986	Australia
Andy Platt	25	1 March 1985	France	2 April 1993	France
Phil Ford	13	17 March 1985	France	11 November 1989	New Zealand
Paul Harkin	1	17 March 1985	France	17 March 1985	France
Chris Johnson	1	17 March 1985	France	17 March 1985	France
Nicky Kiss	1	17 March 1985	France	17 March 1985	France
Roy Powell	19	17 March 1985	France	16 February 1991	France
Shaun Wane	2	17 March 1985	France	16 February 1986	France
Chris Arkwright	2	19 October 1985	New Zealand	9 November 1985	New Zealand
John Fieldhouse	7	19 October 1985	New Zealand	8 November 1986	Australia
Ian Potter	8	19 October 1985	New Zealand	22 November 1986	Australia
Neil James	1	1 March 1986	France	1 March 1986	France
David Laws	1	1 March 1986	France	1 March 1986	France
Tony Marchant	3	1 March 1986	France	8 November 1986	Australia
Kevin Rayne	1	1 March 1986	France	1 March 1986	France
Keith England	11	24 January 1987	France	16 February 1991	France
Mark Forster	2	24 January 1987	France	8 February 1987	France
Mike Gregory	20	24 January 1987	France	24 November 1990	Australia
Roy Haggerty	2	24 January 1987	France	8 February 1987	France
Paul Dixon	15	8 February 1987	France	16 February 1992	France
Karl Fairbank	16	24 October 1987	Papua New Guinea	20 March 1994	France
Paul Groves	1	24 October 1987	Papua New Guinea	24 October 1987	Papua New Guinea
Steve Hampson	12	24 October 1987	Papua New Guinea	31 May 1992	Papua New Guinea
Paul Medley	4	24 October 1987	Papua New Guinea	22 May 1988	Papua New Guinea
Paul Loughlin	15	24 January 1988	France	12 June 1992	Australia
Martin Offiah	33	24 January 1988	France	20 November 1994	Australia
Hugh Waddell	5	24 January 1988	France	21 January 1989	France
David Plange	1	6 February 1988	France	6 February 1988	France
David Hulme	8	22 May 1988	Papua New Guinea	11 November 1989	New Zealand
Paul Hulme	8	28 June 1988	Australia	12 July 1992	New Zealand
Darren Wright	1	28 June 1988	Australia	28 June 1988	Australia
Richie Eyres	9	21 January 1989	France	30 October 1993	New Zealand
Alan Tait	14	21 January 1989	France	6 November 1993	New Zealand
Peter Williams	2	21 January 1989	France	5 February 1989	France
Andy Currier	2	21 October 1989	New Zealand	7 March 1993	France
Paul Newlove	20	21 October 1989	New Zealand	31 October 1998	New Zealand
Kelvin Skerrett	16	21 October 1989	New Zealand	6 November 1993	New Zealand
Denis Betts	32	18 March 1990	France	29 October 1999	New Zealand
Daryl Powell	33	18 March 1990	France	1 November 1996	New Zealand
David Bishop	1	7 April 1990	France	7 April 1990	France
Gerald Cordle	1	7 April 1990	France	7 April 1990	France
Shaun Irwin	4	7 April 1990	France	15 July 1990	New Zealand
Graham Steadman	10	7 April 1990	France	5 November 1994	Australia
Jonathan Davies	13	27 May 1990	Papua New Guinea	22 October 1994	Australia
Paul Eastwood	13	27 May 1990	Papua New Guinea	19 July 1992	New Zealand
Bobbie Goulding	17	27 May 1990	Papua New Guinea	16 November 1997	Australia
Lee Jackson	17	27 May 1990	Papua New Guinea	20 November 1994	Australia
Phil Clarke	16	2 June 1990	Papua New Guinea	20 November 1994	Australia
Chris Bibb	1	24 June 1990	New Zealand	24 June 1990	New Zealand
Martin Dermott	11	24 June 1990	New Zealand	16 October 1993	New Zealand
Karl Harrison	14	27 October 1990	Australia	20 November 1994	Australia
Mark Aston	1	27 January 1991	France	27 January 1991	France
St. John Ellis	3	27 January 1991	France	20 March 1994	France
Les Holliday	3	27 January 1991	France	7 March 1992	France
Ian Lucas	2	27 January 1991	France	12 June 1992	Australia
Kevin Ellis	1	16 February 1991	France	16 February 1991	France
Gary Connolly	31	9 November 1991	Papua New Guinea	15 November 2003	Australia
Michael Jackson	6	9 November 1991	Papua New Guinea	6 November 1993	New Zealand
Paul Moriarty	2	9 November 1991	Papua New Guinea	20 March 1994	France
Gary Price	1	9 November 1991	Papua New Guinea	9 November 1991	Papua New Guinea
Anthony Sullivan	7	9 November 1991	Papua New Guinea	22 October 1999	Australia
John Bentley	2	16 February 1992	France	20 March 1994	France
John Devereux	8	16 February 1992	France	6 November 1993	New Zealand
Jonathan Griffiths	1	16 February 1992	France	16 February 1992	France
Mark Jones	1	16 February 1992	France	16 February 1992	France
Allan Bateman	3	7 March 1992	France	22 October 1994	Australia
Alan Hunte	15	7 March 1992	France	16 November 1997	Australia
Steve McNamara	4	7 March 1992	France	16 November 1997	Australia
Sonny Nickle	6	31 May 1992	Papua New Guinea	20 November 1994	Australia
Billy McGinty	4	26 June 1992	Australia	19 July 1992	New Zealand
Neil Cowie	3	7 March 1993	France	7 November 1998	New Zealand
Mike Ford	2	7 March 1993	France	2 April 1993	France
Chris Joynt	25	7 March 1993	France	9 November 2002	New Zealand
Steve McCurrie	1	7 March 1993	France	7 March 1993	France
Steve Molloy	4	7 March 1993	France	25 October 1996	New Zealand
Stuart Spruce	6	7 March 1993	France	1 November 1996	New Zealand
Jason Robinson	12	16 October 1993	New Zealand	29 October 1999	Australia
Andy Farrell	34	6 November 1993	New Zealand	27 November 2004	Australia
Barrie-Jon Mather	3	20 March 1994	France	1 November 1996	New Zealand
Mick Cassidy	4	22 October 1994	Australia	1 November 1997	Australia
Barrie McDermott	15	22 October 1994	Australia	22 November 2003	Australia
Paul Broadbent	8	28 September 1996	Papua New Guinea	16 November 1997	Australia
Keiron Cunningham	16	28 September 1996	Papua New Guinea	27 June 2006	New Zealand
Iestyn Harris	15	28 September 1996	Papua New Guinea	19 November 2005	Australia
Joey Hayes	1	28 September 1996	Papua New Guinea	28 September 1996	Papua New Guinea
Terry O'Connor	13	28 September 1996	Papua New Guinea	16 November 2002	New Zealand
Rowland Phillips	1	28 September 1996	Papua New Guinea	28 September 1996	Papua New Guinea
Kris Radlinski	20	28 September 1996	Papua New Guinea	22 November 2003	Australia
Paul Sculthorpe	26	28 September 1996	Papua New Guinea	27 June 2006	New Zealand
Tony Smith	5	28 September 1996	Papua New Guinea	14 November 1998	New Zealand
Brian McDermott	4	5 October 1996	Fiji	16 November 1997	Australia
Keith Senior	33	5 October 1996	Fiji	10 November 2007	New Zealand
Adrian Morley	30	18 October 1996	New Zealand	10 November 2007	New Zealand
Karle Hammond	2	25 October 1996	New Zealand	1 November 1996	New Zealand
Bernard Dwyer	1	1 November 1996	New Zealand	1 November 1996	New Zealand
Paul Atcheson	3	1 November 1997	Australia	16 November 1997	Australia
James Lowes	5	1 November 1997	Australia	23 November 2002	New Zealand
Dean Sampson	1	1 November 1997	Australia	1 November 1997	Australia
Mike Forshaw	14	8 November 1997	Australia	22 November 2003	Australia
Simon Haughton	5	8 November 1997	Australia	14 November 1998	New Zealand
Sean Long	14	16 November 1997	Australia	27 June 2006	New Zealand
Darren Fleary	2	31 October 1998	New Zealand	14 November 1998	New Zealand
Lee Gilmour	14	31 October 1998	New Zealand	18 November 2006	Australia
Dale Laughton	5	31 October 1998	New Zealand	29 October 1999	New Zealand
Francis Cummins	3	7 November 1998	New Zealand	29 October 1999	New Zealand
Harvey Howard	1	7 November 1998	New Zealand	7 November 1998	New Zealand
Terry Newton	15	14 November 1998	New Zealand	27 October 2007	New Zealand
Paul Anderson	10	22 October 1999	Australia	15 November 2003	Australia
Andy Hay	2	22 October 1999	Australia	29 October 1999	New Zealand
Ryan Sheridan	3	22 October 1999	Australia	12 July 2002	Australia
Lee Briers	1	26 October 2001	France	26 October 2001	France
Paul Deacon	11	26 October 2001	France	12 November 2005	New Zealand
Stuart Fielden	25	26 October 2001	France	18 November 2006	Australia
David Hodgson	4	26 October 2001	France	10 November 2007	New Zealand
Richard Horne	11	26 October 2001	France	18 November 2006	Australia
Paul Johnson	13	26 October 2001	France	19 November 2005	Australia
Paul King	1	26 October 2001	France	26 October 2001	France
Kevin Sinfield	14	26 October 2001	France	3 November 2007	New Zealand
Paul Wellens	20	26 October 2001	France	10 November 2007	New Zealand
Jamie Peacock	26	11 November 2001	Australia	10 November 2007	New Zealand
Leon Pryce	17	11 November 2001	Australia	3 November 2007	New Zealand
Martin Gleeson	20	12 July 2002	Australia	10 November 2007	New Zealand
Karl Pratt	2	12 July 2002	Australia	9 November 2002	New Zealand
Danny Orr	2	16 November 2002	New Zealand	23 November 2002	New Zealand
Brian Carney	14	8 November 2003	Australia	4 November 2006	Australia
Gareth Ellis	17	22 November 2003	Australia	10 November 2007	New Zealand
Ryan Bailey	4	30 October 2004	Australia	27 November 2004	Australia
Danny McGuire	12	30 October 2004	Australia	10 November 2007	New Zealand
Stuart Reardon	5	30 October 2004	Australia	27 November 2004	Australia
Chev Walker	6	30 October 2004	Australia	19 November 2005	Australia
Stephen Wild	2	30 October 2004	Australia	22 June 2007	France
Sean O'Loughlin	11	13 November 2004	Australia	10 November 2007	New Zealand
Matt Diskin	1	20 November 2004	New Zealand	20 November 2004	New Zealand
Micky Higham	4	20 November 2004	New Zealand	19 November 2005	Australia
Danny Ward	1	20 November 2004	New Zealand	20 November 2004	New Zealand
Rob Burrow	5	29 October 2005	New Zealand	10 November 2007	New Zealand
Nick Fozzard	1	29 October 2005	New Zealand	29 October 2005	New Zealand
Jamie Thackray	3	5 November 2005	Australia	19 November 2005	Australia
Gareth Raynor	6	19 November 2005	Australia	3 November 2007	New Zealand
Ade Gardner	5	27 June 2006	New Zealand	10 November 2007	New Zealand
James Graham	9	27 June 2006	New Zealand	16 November 2019	Papua New Guinea
Garreth Carvell	2	28 October 2006	New Zealand	11 November 2006	New Zealand
Gareth Hock	4	28 October 2006	New Zealand	18 November 2006	Australia
James Roby	7	28 October 2006	New Zealand	10 November 2007	New Zealand
Jon Wilkin	6	4 November 2006	Australia	10 November 2007	New Zealand
Kirk Yeaman	3	4 November 2006	Australia	10 November 2007	New Zealand
Andy Coley	1	22 June 2007	France	22 June 2007	France
Jamie Langley	1	22 June 2007	France	22 June 2007	France
Andy Lynch	1	22 June 2007	France	22 June 2007	France
Chris Melling	1	22 June 2007	France	22 June 2007	France
Paul Sykes	1	22 June 2007	France	22 June 2007	France
Sam Burgess	2	27 October 2007	New Zealand	3 November 2007	New Zealand
Maurie Fa'asavalu	2	27 October 2007	New Zealand	3 November 2007	New Zealand
Jon Clarke	2	3 November 2007	New Zealand	10 November 2007	New Zealand
Jamie Jones-Buchanan	1	10 November 2007	New Zealand	10 November 2007	New Zealand
John Bateman	4	26 October 2019	Tonga	16 November 2019	Papua New Guinea
Tom Burgess	4	26 October 2019	Tonga	16 November 2019	Papua New Guinea
Lachlan Coote	1	26 October 2019	Tonga	26 October 2019	Tonga
Oliver Gildart	1	26 October 2019	Tonga	26 October 2019	Tonga
Ryan Hall	2	26 October 2019	Tonga	2 November 2019	New Zealand
Zak Hardaker	2	26 October 2019	Tonga	2 November 2019	New Zealand
Jackson Hastings	4	26 October 2019	Tonga	16 November 2019	Papua New Guinea
Chris Hill	4	26 October 2019	Tonga	16 November 2019	Papua New Guinea
Josh Hodgson	4	26 October 2019	Tonga	16 November 2019	Papua New Guinea
Josh Jones	3	26 October 2019	Tonga	9 November 2019	New Zealand
Jonny Lomax	4	26 October 2019	Tonga	16 November 2019	Papua New Guinea
Jermaine McGillvary	4	26 October 2019	Tonga	16 November 2019	Papua New Guinea
Luke Thompson	3	26 October 2019	Tonga	16 November 2019	Papua New Guinea
Alex Walmsley	4	26 October 2019	Tonga	16 November 2019	Papua New Guinea
Elliott Whitehead	4	26 October 2019	Tonga	16 November 2019	Papua New Guinea
Gareth Widdop	4	26 October 2019	Tonga	16 November 2019	Papua New Guinea
Daryl Clark	2	2 November 2019	New Zealand	9 November 2019	New Zealand
Jake Connor	3	2 November 2019	New Zealand	16 November 2019	Papua New Guinea
Joe Philbin	2	2 November 2019	New Zealand	16 November 2019	Papua New Guinea
Blake Austin	2	9 November 2019	New Zealand	16 November 2019	Papua New Guinea
Jack Hughes	2	9 November 2019	New Zealand	16 November 2019	Papua New Guinea
George Williams	1	16 November 2019	Papua New Guinea	16 November 2019	Papua New Guinea

== See also ==
- List of uncapped Great Britain national rugby league team players
- List of England national rugby league team players
- List of Ireland national rugby league team players
- List of Scotland national rugby league team players
- List of Wales national rugby league team players
