= Armitstead =

Armitstead is a surname. Notable people with the surname include:

- Claire Armitstead, British journalist and author
- George Armitstead (mayor) (1847–1912), Latvian mayor
- George Armitstead, 1st Baron Armitstead (1824–1915), British businessman, philanthropist and politician
- John Armitstead (1868–1941), English clergyman
- Lizzie Armitstead (born 1988), English cyclist
- William Armitstead (1833–1907), English cricketer

== See also ==
- Armistead
- Armstead
