= Billy Ivison =

English rugby league player (1920–2000)

Personal information
- Full name: William Harold Ivison
- Born: 5 June 1920 Hensingham, England
- Died: 12 March 2000 (aged 79) Hensingham, England

Playing information
- Weight: 13 st 7 lb (86 kg)
- Position: Loose forward
Club
Years	Team	Pld	T	G	FG	P
1945–1959	Workington Town	385	63	8	0	205
Representative
Years	Team	Pld	T	G	FG	P
1947–1957	Cumberland	13	3	0	0	9
1949–1952	England	4	0	0	0	0
1952	Great Britain	1	0	0	0	0

Coaching information
Club
Years	Team	Gms	W	D	L	W%
	Workington Town
Association football career
Senior career*
Years	Team	Apps	(Gls)
1945	Gillingham	1	
- * Club domestic league appearances and goals

William Harold Ivison (5 June 1920 – 12 March 2000) was an English professional association football and rugby league footballer who played in the 1940s and 1950s. He played club level association football for Gillingham F.C., and representative level rugby league (RL) for Great Britain, England and Cumberland and at club level for Workington Town, as a loose forward.

== Background ==
Ivison was born in Hensingham, Cumberland, England, and he died aged 79 in Hensingham, Cumbria, England.

== Playing career ==
=== Club career ===
Ivison played loose forward and won the Lance Todd Trophy in Workington Town's 18–12 victory over Featherstone Rovers in the 1952 Challenge Cup Final during the 1951–52 season at Wembley Stadium, London on Saturday 19 April 1952, in front of a crowd of 72,093, and played loose forward in the 12–21 defeat by Barrow in the 1955 Challenge Cup Final during the 1954–55 season at Wembley Stadium, London on Saturday 30 April 1955, in front of a crowd of 66,513.

=== Representative honours ===
Ivison won caps for England while at Workington Town in 1949 against Wales, and Other Nationalities, in 1951 against Other Nationalities, in 1952 against Other Nationalities.

Ivison represented Great Britain while at Workington Town in 1952 against France (non-Test matches).

Along with William "Billy" Banks, Edward "Ted" Cahill, Gordon Haynes, Keith Holliday, Robert "Bob" Kelly, John McKeown, George Parsons and Edward "Ted" Slevin, Ivison's only Great Britain appearances came against France prior to 1957, these matches were not considered as Test matches by the Rugby Football League, and consequently caps were not awarded.

Ivison represented Cumberland while at Workington Town. He played loose forward, and scored a try in Cumberland's 5–4 victory over Australia in the 1948–49 Kangaroo tour of Great Britain and France match at the Recreation Ground, Whitehaven on Wednesday 13 October 1948, in front of a crowd of 8,818.

== Honoured in Workington ==
Ivison Lane in Workington is named after Ivison.
