= Ted Cahill (rugby league) =

Former GB & England international rugby league footballer and coach

Personal information
- Full name: Edward Cahill
- Born: 1927 (age 98–99) St Helens, Lancashire

Playing information
- Height: 5 ft 8 in (1.73 m)
- Weight: 11 st 4 lb (72 kg)
- Position: Fullback
Club
Years	Team	Pld	T	G	FG	P
1947–49	Liverpool Stanley	75	2	0	0	6
1949–60	Rochdale Hornets	315	32	14	0	124
	Total	390	34	14	0	130
Representative
Years	Team	Pld	T	G	FG	P
1953–	England	2	1	0	0	3
1954	Great Britain	1	0	0	0	0
1951–53	Lancashire	5	0	0	0	0
1954–	GB tour games	8	0	14	0	28
1954–	GB trial game	1	0	1	0	2

Coaching information
Club
Years	Team	Gms	W	D	L	W%
1963–64	Salford	36	9	0	27	25

Edward Cahill (born 1927) is an English former professional rugby league footballer who played in the 1950s. He played at representative level for Great Britain and England and at club level for Vine Tavern ARLFC (in St. Helens), Liverpool Stanley and Rochdale Hornets as a fullback. He coached Salford in the 1963–64 season.

== International honours ==
Ted Cahill won caps for England while at Rochdale Hornets in 1953 against France and Other Nationalities.

He played for Whites against Reds in a Great Britain tour trial match at Station Road, Swinton on Wednesday 10 March 1954 and kicked a goal in a 20–14 defeat. He was later selected for the tour.

Ted Cahill toured Australasia with Great Britain in 1954. He played in eight tour games, kicking 14 goals.

Ted Cahill represented Great Britain while at Rochdale Hornets in 1954 against France (1 non-Test match).

Along with William "Billy" Banks, Gordon Haynes, Keith Holliday, Billy Ivison, Robert "Bob" Kelly, John McKeown, George Parsons and Ted Slevin, Ted Cahill's only Great Britain appearance came against France prior to 1957, these matches were not considered as Test matches by the Rugby Football League, and consequently caps were not awarded.
