= John McKeown (rugby league) =

Great Britain international rugby league footballer

Personal information
- Full name: John J. McKeown
- Born: 5 February 1926; Flimby, England
- Died: 5 September 2006 (aged 80)

Playing information
- Position: Fullback
Club
Years	Team	Pld	T	G	FG	P
1948–61	Whitehaven	417	11	1050	0	2133
Representative
Years	Team	Pld	T	G	FG	P
1949–60	Cumberland	15	0	39	0	78
1956	Great Britain	1	0	3	0	6

John J. McKeown (5 February 1926 – 5 September 2006), also known by the nicknames of "J.J.", and "Mac", was an English professional rugby league footballer who played in the 1940s, 1950s and 1960s. He played at representative level for Great Britain and Cumberland, and at club level for Whitehaven, as a left-footed toe-end style (rather than round the corner style) goal-kicking fullback.

== Background ==
John McKeown's birth was registered in Flimby, Cumberland, England, he died aged 80, his funeral service was held at St Nicholas' Church, Flimby, on Tuesday 19 September 2006, followed by cremation at Distington, Cumbria, England.

== Playing career ==
=== International honours ===
John McKeown represented Great Britain while at Whitehaven in 1956 against France (non-Test match).

Along with William "Billy" Banks, Edward "Ted" Cahill, Gordon Haynes, Keith Holliday, William "Billy" Ivison, Robert "Bob" Kelly, George Parsons and Edward "Ted" Slevin, John McKeown's only Great Britain appearance came against France prior to 1957, these matches were not considered as Test matches by the Rugby Football League, and consequently caps were not awarded.

=== Notable tour matches ===
John McKeown played fullback, and scored 4-goals in Whitehaven's 14-11 victory over Australia in the 1956–57 Kangaroo tour of Great Britain and France match at the Recreation Ground, Whitehaven on Saturday 20 October 1956, in front of a crowd of 10,917.

=== Career records ===
John McKeown holds Whitehaven's "Most Appearances In Season" record with 42 appearances in the 1956–57 season, "Most Goals In A Season" record with 141 goals scored in the 1956–57 season, "Most Appearances In A Career" record with 417 appearances, "Most Goals In A Career" record with 1,050 goals, and "Most Points In A Career" record with 2133 points.

== Honoured at Whitehaven ==
John McKeown is a Whitehaven Hall Of Fame Inductee, and the clubhouse at the Recreation Ground is named the J.J. McKeown Bar
