= Zach Dockar-Clay =

New Zealand rugby league footballer

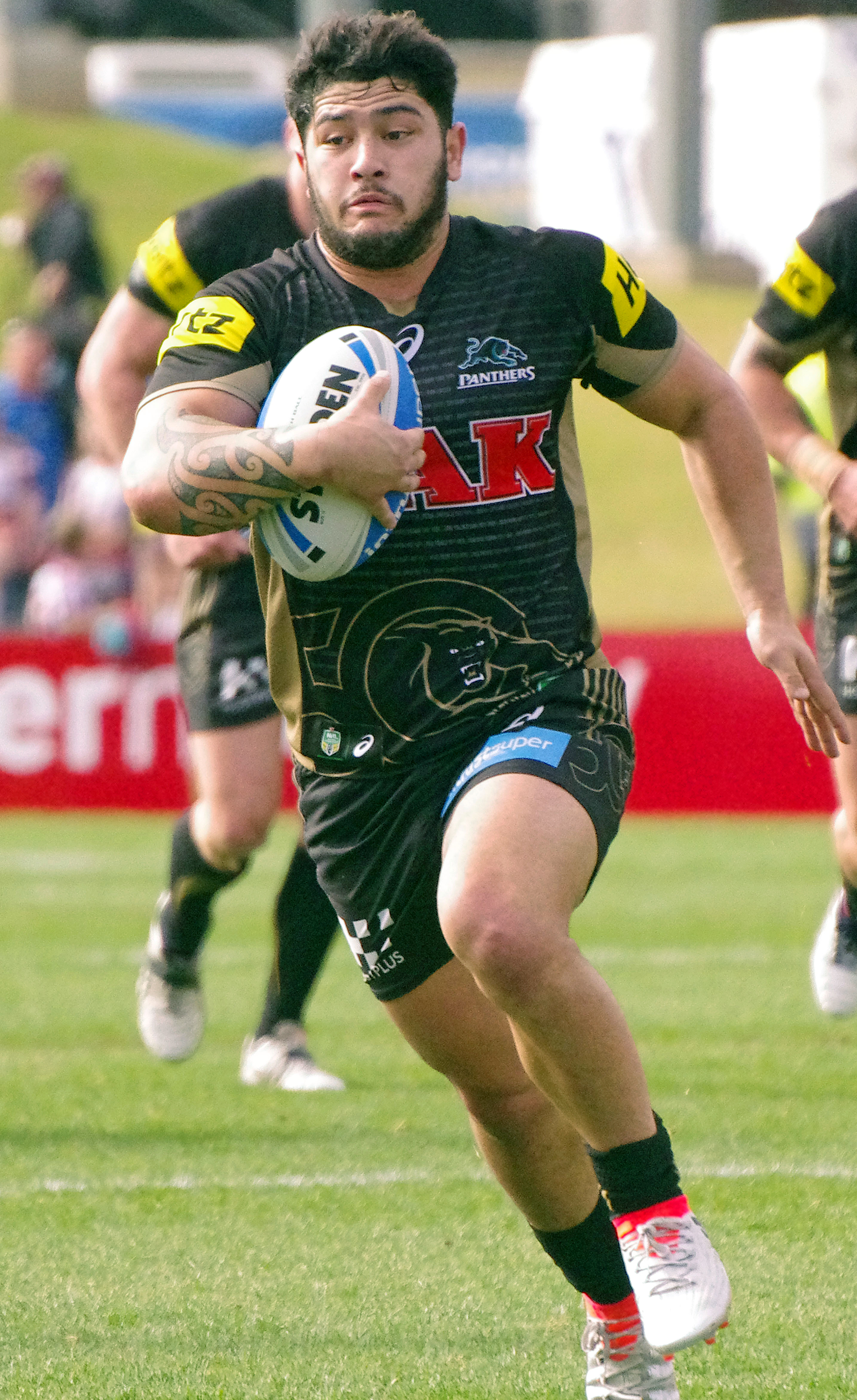

Personal information
- Full name: Zach Dockar-Clay
- Born: 24 April 1995 (age 31) New Plymouth, New Zealand
- Height: 172 cm (5 ft 8 in)
- Weight: 88 kg (13 st 12 lb)

Playing information
- Position: Hooker, Halfback, Five-eighth
Club
Years	Team	Pld	T	G	FG	P
2017	Hull Kingston Rovers	19	6	10	0	44
2022	Canterbury Bulldogs	14	1	0	0	4
2024–25	Sydney Roosters	22	1	0	0	4
2026	Manly Sea Eagles	1	0	0	0	0
	Total	56	8	10	0	52
Representative
Years	Team	Pld	T	G	FG	P
2016	NSW Residents	1	0	0	0	0
2023	Māori All Stars	2	1	0	0	4
- Source: As of 23 September 2026
- Relatives: Alec Dockar (great-grandfather)

Zach Dockar-Clay (born 24 April 1995) is a New Zealand professional rugby league footballer who most recently played as a hooker for the Manly Warringah Sea Eagles in the NRL.

He previously played for the Canterbury-Bankstown Bulldogs and the Sydney Roosters in the National Rugby League (NRL). He also played for Hull Kingston Rovers in the RFL Championship and Super League Qualifiers.

== Early life ==
Born in New Plymouth, New Zealand, Dockar-Clay is of Māori descent (from the Ngāti Porou and Te Āti Awa iwi). He is the great-grandson of Great Britain and England rugby league representative Alec Dockar.

He played his junior rugby league for the Bell Block Marist Dragons.

== Playing career ==
=== Parramatta Eels ===
Dockar-Clay played 78 games for the Parramatta Eels in the National Youth Competition from 2012 to 2015, scoring 34 tries, kicking 40 goals and 1 field goal. Dockar-Clay represented the Junior Kiwis on three occasions between 2013 and 2015, captaining the team in 2015. In June 2015, he signed a contract with the Penrith Panthers starting in 2016.

=== Penrith Panthers ===
In February 2016, Dockar-Clay was selected as a member of the Panthers' squad for the 2016 Auckland Nines pre-season tournament. He captained Penrith's New South Wales Cup team throughout 2016. On 15 October 2016, Dockar-Clay represented the New Zealand Māori against the New Zealand Residents. In February 2017, Dockar-Clay was selected to play in the 2017 Auckland Nines. In March 2017, he signed with Hull Kingston Rovers until the end of 2018, effective immediately.

=== Hull KR ===
Dockar-Clay made his professional rugby league debut for Hull KR on 10 April 2017 against the Swinton Lions, scoring a try. He played 19 games in his first season at the club, scoring 6 tries and kicking 10 goals.

=== Townsville Blackhawks ===
In November 2017, after helping Hull KR to gain promotion to the Super League, Dockar-Clay was granted an early release from his contract and returned to Australia, signing with the Townsville Blackhawks for the 2018 season.

=== Blacktown Workers ===
In 2019, Dockar-Clay signed a contract to join Manly Cup NSW side the Blacktown Workers Sea Eagles.

=== Western Suburbs ===
In 2021, he signed for NSW Cup side Western Suburbs.

=== Canterbury-Bankstown Bulldogs ===
In 2022, Dockar-Clay signed for Canterbury. Dockar-Clay spent the start of the season playing for the clubs NSW Cup side. In round 11 of the 2022 NRL season, he made his NRL debut against the Wests Tigers at Leichhardt Oval. Dockar-Clay made a total of 14 appearances for Canterbury throughout the 2022 season which were all from the interchange bench. The club would finish 12th on the table and miss the finals.

=== North Sydney ===
In November 2022, Dockar-Clay signed a contract to join NSW Cup side North Sydney ahead of the 2023 season. Dockar-Clay was part of the North Sydney side which claimed the Minor Premiership and reached the 2023 NSW Cup grand final against South Sydney. Dockar-Clay captained the side in their 22–18 loss.

=== Sydney Roosters ===
Ahead of the 2024 NRL season, Dockar-Clay joined the Sydney Roosters. In round 6, he was named to make his club debut against Newcastle. Dockar-Clay would play off the interchange bench in their 22–20 victory. On 21 May, the Sydney Roosters hit back at claims that Dockar-Clay had been taking illegal substances on a live stream along with fellow players Brandon Smith, Terrell May, Naufahu Whyte and Spencer Leniu. The club released a statement which read “The Sydney Roosters have been made aware of a small clip from a longer live stream that some on social media have claimed identifies behaviour that breaches NRL rules. “The clip reveals no use of illicit substances or any other breach of NRL rules, however some see fit to make that grossly distorted and clearly damaging claim".

=== Manly Warringah Sea Eagles ===
Dockar-Clay was one of five players farewelled by the Sydney Roosters at the end of their season. He was linked with a move to Manly. In the 2026 NRL season, Dockar-Clay made one appearance for Manly. He spent the majority of the year with the clubs NSW Cup side which finished last. In September, he was released by Manly.
