= Keith Bridges =

English rugby league footballer (1929-2014)

- Keith Bridges in 1959

Personal information
- Born: 23 September 1929 Wakefield district, England
- Died: 23 February 2014 (aged 84)

Playing information
- Position: Hooker
Club
Years	Team	Pld	T	G	FG	P
1954–57	Wakefield Trinity	36	2	0	0	6
Sep 1957–63	Castleford	110	4	0	0	12
	Total	146	6	0	0	18
- Relatives: John Keith Bridges (son)

Keith Bridges (1929 – 23 February 2014) was an English professional rugby league footballer who played in the 1950s and 1960s. He played at club level for Sharlston Rovers, Wakefield Trinity, and Castleford, as a hooker.

== Background ==
Keith Bridges' birth was registered in Wakefield, West Riding of Yorkshire, England, he was raised in Sharlston, he worked as a miner c. 1954, and as self-employed construction worker, he lived on Kimberley Street, Featherstone c. 1954, and he died aged 84 in Pinderfields Hospital, Wakefield, West Yorkshire, England.

== Playing career ==
=== County Cup Final appearances ===
Keith Bridges played hooker in Wakefield Trinity's 23–5 victory over Hunslet in the 1956–57 Yorkshire Cup Final during the 1956–57 season at Headingley, Leeds on Saturday 20 October 1956.

=== Club career ===
Keith Bridges made his début for Wakefield Trinity in the 21–13 victory over Swinton at Belle Vue, Wakefield on Saturday 30 October 1954, and he played last match for Wakefield Trinity in the 14–14 draw with Castleford at Wheldon Road, Castleford on Tuesday 25 December 1956.

== Personal life ==
Keith Bridges is the father of the former rugby league footballer, John Keith Bridges.
