= Derrick Harrison =

English rugby league footballer

Personal information
- Born: 12 December 1929 Wakefield, England
- Died: 23 December 1967 (aged 38) Wakefield, England

Playing information
- Position: Prop
Club
Years	Team	Pld	T	G	FG	P
1953–59	Wakefield Trinity	154	20			60
1959–61	Batley	82	3			9
	Total	236	23	0	0	69

Derrick Harrison (12 December 1929 – 23 December 1967) was an English professional rugby league footballer who played in the 1950s and 1960s. He played at club level for Wakefield Trinity and Batley, as a prop.

== Background ==
Derrick Harrison was born in Wakefield, West Riding of Yorkshire, England, he worked at Leake and Carney, Holmfield Lane, Wakefield, and he died aged-38 in Wakefield, West Riding of Yorkshire, England.

== Playing career ==
=== County Cup Final appearances ===
Derrick Harrison played at prop in Wakefield Trinity's 23–5 victory over Hunslet in the 1956–57 Yorkshire Cup Final during the 1956–57 season at Headingley, Leeds on Saturday 20 October 1956.

=== Notable tour matches ===
Derrick Harrison played at prop in Wakefield Trinity’s 17-12 victory over Australia in the 1956–57 Kangaroo tour of Great Britain and France match at Belle Vue, Wakefield on Monday 10 December 1956.
