= Armstead =

Armstead is a surname, and may refer to:

- Arik Armstead (born 1993), American football player
- Armond Armstead (born 1990), American football player
- Henry Hugh Armstead (1828–1905), British sculptor
- Izora Armstead (1942 – 2004), American pop singer
- Jason Armstead (born 1979), American football player
- Jessie Armstead (born 1970), American football player
- Jo Armstead (born 1944), American R&B singer and songwriter also known as Joshie Armstead
- Malcolm Armstead (born 1988), American basketball player
- Peter Armstead, English rugby league footballer who played in the 1950s
- Ray Armstead (born 1960), American sprinter
- Ryquell Armstead (born 1996), American football player
- Samuel Armstead (c. 1804–1908), American politician, minister, restaurateur
- Terron Armstead (born 1991), American football player
- Tim Armstead (1965–2025), American judge

== See also ==
- Armistead (disambiguation)
