= Ted Slevin =

British international rugby league footballer (1927–1998)

Personal information
- Full name: Edward Slevin
- Born: 15 July 1927 Rossington, Doncaster, England
- Died: 7 November 1998 (aged 71)

Playing information
- Height: 5 ft 9 in (175 cm)
- Weight: 14 st 12 lb (94 kg)
- Position: Prop, Second-row
Club
Years	Team	Pld	T	G	FG	P
1948–51	Wigan	113	16	0	0	48
1951–63	Huddersfield	441
	Rochdale Hornets
	Total	554	16	0	0	48
Representative
Years	Team	Pld	T	G	FG	P
1949	Lancashire	1	1	0	0	3
1950–53	England	2	0	0	0	0
1953–54	Great Britain	2

Edward "Ted" Slevin (15 July 1927 – 7 November 1998) was an English professional rugby league footballer who played in the 1940s, 1950s and 1960s. He played at representative level for Great Britain, England and Lancashire (despite being born in Yorkshire), and at club level for Wigan, Huddersfield and Rochdale Hornets, as a prop, or second-row.

== Background ==
Ted Slevin was born in Rossington, Doncaster, West Riding of Yorkshire, England, he and his family moved to Lancashire when he was just a few months old, he was later the landlord of The Beech Tree, Beech Hill Lane, Wigan, and he died aged 71.

== Club career ==
=== Wigan ===
Slevin made his début for Wigan in the 14-12 victory over Leeds at Headingley, Leeds on Saturday 8 January 1949, he scored his first try for Wigan in the 19-5 victory over St. Helens at Central Park, Wigan on Friday 15 April 1949, he scored his last try (2-tries) for Wigan in the 22-13 victory over St. Helens at Central Park, Wigan on Friday 23 March 1951, and he played his last match for Wigan in the 46-0 victory over Liverpool City at Central Park, Wigan on Saturday 6 October 1951.

Slevin played in Wigan's 20-2 victory over Huddersfield in the Championship Final during the 1949–50 season at Maine Road, Manchester on Saturday 13 May 1950, played in Wigan's victory in the Lancashire League during the 1949–50 season, and played at prop in the 20-7 victory over Leigh in the 1949–50 Lancashire Cup Final during the 1949–50 season at Wilderspool Stadium, Warrington on Saturday 29 October 1949.

Slevin played at second-row and scored a try in the 28-5 victory over Warrington in the 1950–51 Lancashire Cup Final during the 1950–51 season at Station Road, Swinton on Saturday 4 November 1950, and played at second-row in Wigan's 10–0 victory over Barrow in the Challenge Cup Final at Wembley Stadium, London on Saturday 5 May 1951.

=== Huddersfield ===
Slevin played in Huddersfield's victory in the Yorkshire League during the 1951–52 season. Slevin played at prop in the 15-10 victory over St. Helens in the 1953–54 Challenge Cup Final during the 1952–53 season at Wembley Stadium, London on Saturday 25 April 1953, in front of a crowd of 89,588, and played in the 18-8 victory over Batley in the 1952–53 Yorkshire Cup Final during the 1952–53 season at Headingley, Leeds on Saturday 15 November 1952.

Slevin played at prop in the 15-8 victory over York in the 1957–58 Yorkshire Cup Final during the 1957–58 season at Headingley, Leeds on Saturday 19 October 1957, played at prop in the 10–16 defeat by Wakefield Trinity in the 1960–61 Yorkshire Cup Final during the 1960–61 season at Headingley, Leeds on Saturday 29 October 1960. Slevin played in the 6-12 defeat by Wakefield Trinity in the 1961–62 Challenge Cup Final during the 1961–62 season at Wembley Stadium, London on Saturday 12 May 1962, in front of a crowd of 81,263, and played in the 14-5 victory over Wakefield Trinity in the Championship Final during the 1961–62 season at Odsal Stadium, Bradford on Saturday 19 May 1962.

==== Testimonial match ====
Slevin's Testimonial match at Huddersfield took place in 1962.

=== All Six Cups ===
Only five rugby league footballers have won "All Six Cups" during their career, they are; Aubrey Casewell (while at Salford and Leeds), Alan Edwards (while at Salford and Bradford Northern), John Etty (while at Oldham and Wakefield Trinity), Ted Slevin (while at Wigan and Huddersfield), and Derek Turner (while at Oldham and Wakefield Trinity). "All Six Cups" being the Challenge Cup, Championship, Lancashire Cup, Lancashire League, Yorkshire Cup and Yorkshire League.

In 1999, Slevin was one of 21 players inducted into Huddersfield's Hall of Fame.

== Representative career ==
=== County honours ===
Slevin played at prop and scored a try in Lancashire's 12-3 victory over Yorkshire at Thrum Hall, Halifax on Tuesday 3 May 1949.

=== International honours ===
Slevin won caps for England while at Wigan in 1950 against Wales, and while at Huddersfield in 1953 against France. Slevin also represented Great Britain while at Huddersfield in 1953 against France, and in 1954 against France (2 non-Test matches). Along with William "Billy" Banks, Edward "Ted" Cahill, Gordon Haynes, Keith Holliday, William "Billy" Ivison, Robert "Bob" Kelly, John McKeown and George Parsons, Slevin's only Great Britain appearances came against France prior to 1957, these matches were not considered as Test matches by the Rugby Football League, and consequently caps were not awarded.
