= Billy Banks (rugby) =

Great Britain and Wales international rugby league footballer (1925–1991)

Personal information
- Full name: William Martin Banks
- Born: 11 January 1925 Maesteg, Wales
- Died: August 1991 (aged 66) Huddersfield, England

Playing information

Rugby union
- Position: Scrum-half
Club
Years	Team	Pld	T	G	FG	P
	Maesteg RFC

Rugby league
- Position: Stand-off, Scrum-half
Club
Years	Team	Pld	T	G	FG	P
1946	Leeds	13	3	0	0	9
1946–48	Wakefield Trinity	44	12	3	0	42
1948–56	Huddersfield	281	41	4	0	131
1956–58	Whitehaven	68	5	0	0	15
1959–60	Salford	50	4	0	0	12
	Total	456	65	7	0	209
Representative
Years	Team	Pld	T	G	FG	P
1954	Combined Nationalities	1	1	0	0	3
1949	British Empire	1	0	0	0	0
1955	Other Nationalities	2	0	0	0	0
1949–53	Wales	17	1	1	0	5
1953–54	Great Britain	2	0	0	0	0

William Martin Banks (11 January 1925 – August 1991) was a Welsh rugby union and World Cup winning professional rugby league footballer who played in the 1940s and 1950s. He played club level rugby union (RU) for Maesteg RFC, as a scrum-half and representative level rugby league (RL) for Great Britain, Wales, Other Nationalities, British Empire and Combined Nationalities, and at club level for Leeds, Wakefield Trinity, Huddersfield, Whitehaven and Salford, as a stand-off, or scrum-half.

== Background ==
Billy Banks was born in Maesteg, Wales in 1925. After his rugby league career ended, he became a taxi driver in Huddersfield. He returned frequently to Maesteg to visit family and friends. He died in 1991 aged 66 in Huddersfield, West Yorkshire, England.

== Playing career ==
=== International honours ===
Billy Banks represented Combined Nationalities and scored a try in the 15-19 defeat by France at Stade de Gerland, Lyon on Sunday 3 January 1954, won 17 caps for Wales (RL) between 1949–1953 while at Huddersfield and represented Great Britain (RL) while at Huddersfield in 1953 against France and in 1954 against France (2 non-Test matches).

Billy Banks was selected for Great Britain Squad while at Huddersfield for the 1954 Rugby League World Cup in France. However, Billy Banks did not participate in any of the four matches, with Gerry Helme playing as scrum-half in all four matches.

Along with Edward "Ted" Cahill, Gordon Haynes, Keith Holliday, William "Billy" Ivison, Robert "Bob" Kelly, John McKeown, George Parsons and Edward "Ted" Slevin, Billy Banks' only Great Britain appearances came against France prior to 1957, these matches were not considered as Test matches by the Rugby Football League, and consequently caps were not awarded.

=== Club career ===
Billy Banks moved from the rugby union (RU) club Maesteg RFC to the professional rugby league (RL) club Leeds in 1946, he made his début for Leeds against Keighley at Headingley, Leeds on Saturday 23 February 1946, Banks was transferred from Leeds to Wakefield Trinity in 1946 for £500 (based on increases in average earnings, this would be approximately £49,450 in 2016), he made his début for Wakefield Trinity during December 1946, Banks played his last match for Wakefield Trinity during 1947–48 season, he was transferred from Wakefield Trinity to Huddersfield in August 1948 for £1,850, (based on increases in average earnings, this would be approximately £161,500 in 2016), Banks played 281 games for Huddersfield between 1948 and 1956, he was transferred from Huddersfield to Whitehaven in 1956, and Banks went on to play for Salford before retiring in 1960.

=== Championship final appearances ===
Billy Banks played scrum-half in Huddersfield's 2-20 defeat by Wigan in the Championship Final during the 1949–50 at Maine Road, Manchester on Saturday 13 May 1950.

=== Challenge Cup Final appearances ===
Billy Banks played scrum-half and scored a try in Huddersfield's 15-10 victory over St. Helens in the 1952–53 Challenge Cup Final during the 1952–53 season at Wembley Stadium, London on Saturday 25 April 1953, in front of a crowd of 89,588.

=== County Cup Final appearances ===
Billy Banks played scrum-half in Huddersfield's 4-11 defeat by Bradford Northern in the 1949–50 Yorkshire Cup Final during the 1949–50 season at Headingley, Leeds on Saturday 29 October 1949, and played scrum-half in the 18-8 victory over Batley in the 1952–53 Yorkshire Cup Final during the 1952–53 season at Headingley, Leeds on Saturday 15 November 1952.

=== Notable tour matches ===
Billy Banks played scrum-half in Whitehaven's 14-11 victory over Australia in the 1956–57 Kangaroo tour of Great Britain and France match at the Recreation Ground, Whitehaven on Saturday 20 October 1956, in front of a crowd of 10,917.
