= Gordon Haynes =

GB international rugby league footballer

Personal information
- Full name: Gordon Haynes
- Born: 21 December 1928 Warrington, England
- Died: 4 July 2015 (aged 86) Warrington, England

Playing information
- Position: Loose forward
Club
Years	Team	Pld	T	G	FG	P
1953–59	Swinton	128	19	0	0	57
1959–60	Oldham	11	0	0	0	0
	Total	139	19	0	0	57
Representative
Years	Team	Pld	T	G	FG	P
1956	Great Britain	1	0	0	0	0

Gordon Haynes (21 December 1928 – 4 July 2015) was an English professional rugby league footballer who played in the 1950s and 1960s. He played at representative level for Great Britain, and at club level for Swinton and Oldham as a loose forward.

== Background ==
Haynes was born in Warrington, Lancashire, England. He played amateur rugby league for Latchford Albion before signing for Swinton.

== International honours ==
Haynes represented Great Britain while at Swinton in April 1956 against France (non-Test match) at Odsal Stadium, Bradford. Great Britain won 18-10 in front of a crowd of 10,453.

Along with William "Billy" Banks, Edward "Ted" Cahill, Keith Holliday, William "Billy" Ivison, Robert "Bob" Kelly, John McKeown, George Parsons and Edward "Ted" Slevin, Gordon Haynes' only Great Britain appearance came against France prior to 1957, these matches were not considered as Test matches by the Rugby Football League, and consequently caps were not awarded.
