= Frank Haigh =

English rugby league footballer (1931–2025)

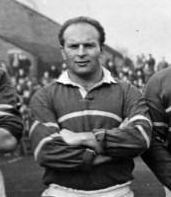

Personal information
- Born: 10 February 1931 Bingley, West Yorkshire, England
- Died: 4 January 2025 (aged 93)

Playing information
- Height: 5ft 9½" (176cm)
- Weight: 14 st (89kg)
- Position: Prop
Club
Years	Team	Pld	T	G	FG	P
≤1956–≥59	Wakefield Trinity	84	11			33
≤1962–≥65	Keighley	83
	Total	167	11	0	0	33

Frank Haigh (10 February 1931 – 4 January 2025) was an English professional rugby league footballer who played in the 1950s and 1960s. He played at club level for Wakefield Trinity, and Keighley, as a prop.

== Playing career ==
=== County Cup Final appearances ===
Frank Haigh played at prop in Wakefield Trinity's 23–5 victory over Hunslet in the 1956–57 Yorkshire Cup Final during the 1956–57 season at Headingley Stadium on 20 October 1956.

=== Notable tour matches ===
Frank Haigh played at prop in Wakefield Trinity’s 17–12 victory over Australia in the 1956–57 Kangaroo tour of Great Britain and France match at Belle Vue, Wakefield on Monday 10 December 1956.

== Outside of Rugby League ==
At 17 Frank won the Junior Mr. Britain bodybuilding contest and went on to compete in numerous events including the 1953 Mr Universe competition in London alongside Sean Connery. A gym he setup in Keighley remains to this day and is known as "Frank's Gym".

Haigh died on 4 January 2025, at the age of 93.
