= Keith Holliday =

Great Britain and international rugby league footballer and coach (1934–2017)

Personal information
- Full name: Keith Holliday
- Born: 6 April 1934 Wakefield, England
- Died: 9 March 2017 (aged 82) Wakefield, England

Playing information
- Height: 5 ft 8.5 in (1.740 m)
- Weight: 12 st 8 lb (80 kg)
- Position: Centre, Stand-off, Scrum-half
Club
Years	Team	Pld	T	G	FG	P
1952–66	Wakefield Trinity	438	94	0	0	282
1966–68	Bramley	41+1	2	0	0	6
	Total	480	96	0	0	288
Representative
Years	Team	Pld	T	G	FG	P
1956–61	Yorkshire	2	1	0	0	3
1956	Great Britain	1	0	0	0	0

Coaching information
Club
Years	Team	Gms	W	D	L	W%
1966–68	Bramley	74	27	0	47	36

Keith Holliday (6 April 1934 – 9 March 2017) was an English professional rugby league footballer who played in the 1950s and 1960s, and coached in the 1960s. He played at representative level for Great Britain and Yorkshire (captain), and at club level for Eastmoor ARLFC, Wakefield Trinity (captain), and Bramley, as a centre, stand-off, or scrum-half, and coached at club level for Bramley.

== Background ==
Keith Holliday's birth was registered in Wakefield, West Riding of Yorkshire, England. He was a pupil at Cathedral School, Wakefield, he worked as a plumber at Wakefield Corporation c. 1960, he died aged 82 in Wakefield, West Yorkshire, his funeral took place at Wakefield Crematorium, Crigglestone, Wakefield on 3 April 2017.

== Playing career ==
=== Wakefield Trinity career ===
Keith Holliday is a former Wakefield Trinity player who won at Wembley three times. The scrum half was one of the club’s servants and ranks sixth on the club’s all-time appearance list, with ten winner's medals, as well as county and international recognition.

Holliday's Trinity career spanned fourteen years (1952–66); he played 438 times. Only Neil Fox has played more post-war Trinity games. He was an outstanding local product and arrived at Wakefield Trinity via Cathedral School and Eastmoor ARLFC. He progressed through the intermediate and A-teams before making his début in the first match of the 1952–53 season, scoring a try in a 30–21 victory over Doncaster.

Holliday made steady progress, starting out as a stand off and alternating in the centres and within four years of his début, he represented Great Britain, partnering Don Fox, in an unofficial 18–10 victory over France at Odsal Stadium, Bradford in 1956. He added to his representative honours a season later when he was stand off for Yorkshire, in defeat by Cumberland at Recreation Ground (Whitehaven), Whitehaven.

By the late 1950s, Trinity were coming out of the wilderness on the domestic front, reaching their first major final in five years. A 23–5 Yorkshire Cup Final victory over Hunslet gave Keith the first of his cup winner's medals in 1956. He had now formed a formidable half back partnership with Ken Rollin, and it was not until 1958 when he moved to scrum half when Harold Poynton became his half back partner.

The try-maker turned try scorer with two scorching tries at Wembley in 1960, when Trinity defeated Hull FC, 38–5 to win the RL Challenge Cup. It was the first of three Challenge Cup winners medals for Keith as he was at scrum half, again, in 1962 and 1963 which went alongside four Yorkshire League Championship winners medals (1959, 1960, 1962 and 1966) and two further Yorkshire Cup winners medals (1961–62 and 1964–65). He was also one win away from the League Championship on two occasions after final losses in 1960 and 1962; Keith playing in nine major finals for Trinity, winning six.

Keith remained the major tradesman at scrum half throughout the early 1960s, the club being one win away from winning ‘All Four Cups’ on 1961–62 and being rewarded with a testimonial season in 1962–63. He gained his second county cap in 1961, captaining Yorkshire in defeat by Lancashire at Hilton Park, Leigh. He moved to loose forward in 1964 before playing his last game for Trinity, in defeat by Hull, in March 1966. He then moved to Bramley as player coach.

He finished his career with 94 tries and was also club captain in the 1957–58 season, being voted the supporter’s player of the years two years running in 1961–62 and 1962–63 a true club legend. He was inducted into the club's Hall of Fame in 2015.

=== International honours ===
Keith Holliday played stand-off for Great Britain while at Wakefield Trinity in the 18–10 victory over France (non-Test match) at Odsal Stadium, Bradford in 1956.

Along with Billy Banks, Ted Cahill, Gordon Haynes, Billy Ivison, Bob Kelly, John McKeown, George Parsons and Ted Slevin, Keith Holliday's only Great Britain appearance came against France prior to 1957, these matches were not considered as Test matches by the Rugby Football League, and consequently caps were not awarded.

=== County honours ===
Keith Holliday was selected for Yorkshire County XIII while at Wakefield Trinity during the 1956–57 season.

=== Championship final appearances ===
Keith Holliday played scrum-half in Wakefield Trinity's 3–27 defeat by Wigan in the Rugby Football League Championship Final during the 1959–60 season at Odsal Stadium, Bradford on Saturday 21 May 1960.

=== County League appearances ===
Keith Holliday played in Wakefield Trinity's victories in the Yorkshire county league during the 1958–59 season (captain), 1959–60 season, 1961–62 season and 1962–63 season.

=== Challenge Cup Final appearances ===
Keith Holliday played scrum-half, and scored 2-tries in Wakefield Trinity's 38–5 victory over Hull F.C. in the 1959–60 Challenge Cup Final during the 1959–60 season at Wembley Stadium, London on Saturday 14 May 1960, in front of a crowd of 79,773, played scrum-half in the 12–6 victory over Huddersfield in the 1961–62 Challenge Cup Final during the 1961–62 season at Wembley Stadium, London on Saturday 12 May 1962, in front of a crowd of 81,263, and played scrum-half in the 25–10 victory over Wigan in the 1962–63 Challenge Cup Final during the 1962–63 season at Wembley Stadium, London on Saturday 11 May 1963, in front of a crowd of 84,492.

=== County Cup Final appearances ===
Keith Holliday played stand-off in Wakefield Trinity's 23–5 victory over Hunslet in the 1956–57 Yorkshire Cup Final during the 1956–57 season at Headingley, Leeds on Saturday 20 October 1956, played stand-off in the 20–24 defeat by Leeds in the 1958–59 Yorkshire Cup Final during the 1958–59 season at Odsal Stadium, Bradford on Saturday 18 October 1958, played scrum-half in the 19–9 victory over Leeds in the 1961–62 Yorkshire Cup Final during the 1961–62 season at Odsal Stadium, Bradford on Saturday 11 November 1961, and played loose forward in the 18–2 victory over Leeds in the 1964–65 Yorkshire Cup Final during the 1964–65 season at Fartown, Huddersfield on Saturday 31 October 1964.

=== Notable tour matches ===
Keith Holliday played at centre in Wakefield Trinity's 17–12 victory over Australia in the 1956–57 Kangaroo tour of Great Britain and France match at Belle Vue, Wakefield on Monday 10 December 1956.

=== Testimonial match ===
Keith Holliday's Testimonial match at Wakefield Trinity took place against Huddersfield in 1962.

== Contemporaneous article extract ==
"Wakefield Trinity have a record in grooming local talent, and there is a line of players who have come, over the years, via Trinity's own Junior teams from Wakefield City Schools' football. Keith Holliday is one of them. His career started at the Cathedral School, then on to Eastmoor Juniors and Trinity's own "Nursery" before signing for the Club in 1952. Gained Yorkshire county honours and a Great Britain place against France at off-half, and had experience also at centre for his Club before changing to the scrum-half berth. Captain of Trinity in their Yorkshire League success of 1958–9".
