= 1956–57 Yorkshire Cup =

1956 rugby league season

- Structure: Regional knockout championship
- Teams: 16
- Winners: Wakefield Trinity
- Runners-up: Hunslet

The 1956 Yorkshire Cup was the forty-ninth occasion on which the rugby league competition known as the Yorkshire County Cup had been held. Featuring clubs from the 1956–57 Northern Rugby Football League season, matches were played over September and October 1956. Wakefield Trinity won the trophy by beating Hunslet in the final.

== Background ==
The Rugby League Yorkshire Cup competition was a knock-out competition between (mainly professional) rugby league clubs from the county of Yorkshire. The actual area was at times increased to encompass other teams from outside the county such as Newcastle, Mansfield, Coventry, and even London (in the form of Acton & Willesden. The Rugby League season always (until the onset of "Summer Rugby" in 1996) ran from around August-time through to around May-time and this competition always took place early in the season, in the Autumn, with the final taking place in (or just before) December (The only exception to this was when disruption of the fixture list was caused during, and immediately after, the two World Wars)

== Competition and results ==
This season there were no junior/amateur clubs taking part, no new entrants and no "leavers" and so the total of entries remained the same at sixteen. This in turn resulted in no byes in the first round.

=== Round 1 ===
Involved 8 matches (with no byes) and 16 clubs

Game No	Fixture date	Home team	Score	Away team	Venue	Att	Rec	Notes	Ref
1	Sat 01 Sep 1956	Castleford	23–17	Bradford Northern	Wheldon Road				
2	Sat 01 Sep 1956	Halifax	23–12	Dewsbury	Thrum Hall				
3	Sat 01 Sep 1956	Huddersfield	41–2	Batley	Fartown	6,498			
4	Sat 01 Sep 1956	Hull F.C.	6–7	Featherstone Rovers	Boulevard				
5	Sat 01 Sep 1956	Hunslet	45–0	Doncaster	Parkside				
6	Sat 01 Sep 1956	Keighley	33–8	Hull Kingston Rovers	Lawkholme Lane				
7	Sat 01 Sep 1956	Wakefield Trinity	36–15	Leeds	Belle Vue				
8	Sat 01 Sep 1956	York	7–2	Bramley	Clarence Street				

=== Round 2 - quarterfinals ===
Involved 4 matches and 8 clubs

Game No	Fixture date	Home team	Score	Away team	Venue	Att	Rec	Notes	Ref
1	Mon 10 Sep 1956	Wakefield Trinity	13–11	Huddersfield	Belle Vue	13,301			
2	Tue 11 Sep 1956	Castleford	9–26	Hunslet	Wheldon Road				
3	Tue 11 Sep 1956	Halifax	15–11	Keighley	Thrum Hall				
4	Thu 13 Sep 1956	York	12–8	Featherstone Rovers	Belle Vue				

=== Round 3 – semifinals ===
Involved 2 matches and 4 clubs

Game No	Fixture date	Home team	Score	Away team	Venue	Att	Rec	Notes	Ref
1	Mon 24 Sep 1956	York	6–13	Hunslet	Belle Vue				
2	Tue 25 Sep 1956	Wakefield Trinity	14–13	Halifax	Belle Vue				

=== Final ===
The 1956 Yorkshire Cup final was played between Wakefield Trinity and Hunslet. The match was played at Headingley, Leeds, now in West Yorkshire. The attendance was 31,147 and receipts were £5,609. This is the last occasion on which the attendance at a Yorkshire Cup final would exceed 30,000. Wakefield won the match 23–5 to claim the trophy.

20 October 1956

Wakefield Trinity	23 – 5	Hunslet
Tries: Smith (2), Cooper (2), Mortimer; Goals: Mortimer (4)		Tries: Child; Goals: Talbot

Headingley, Leeds
Attendance: 31,147
Referee: N. T. Railton (Wigan)

==== Teams and scorers ====
Wakefield Trinity	№	Hunslet
	Teams	
Frank Mortimer	1	Billy Langton
Fred Smith	2	Frank Child
Albert Mortimer	3	Jim Stockdill
Colin Bell	4	Gordon Waite
Eric Cooper	5	Alan Preece
Keith Holliday	6	Brian Gabbitas
Ken Rollin	7	Arthur Talbot
Derrick Harrison	8	Don Hatfield
Keith Bridges	9	Sam Smith
Frank Haigh	10	Colin Cooper
Bob Kelly	11	Brian Shaw
Peter Armstead	12	Arthur Clues
Les Chamberlain	13	Geoff Gunney
??	Coach	??

=== The road to success ===
First round
Wakefield Trinity	36
Leeds	15
Huddersfield	41
Batley	2
Halifax	23
Dewsbury	12
Keighley	33
Hull Kingston Rovers	8
York	7
Bramley	2
Hull F.C.	6
Featherstone Rovers	7
Castleford	23
Bradford Northern	17
Hunslet	45
Doncaster	0

Second round
Wakefield Trinity	13
Huddersfield	11
Halifax	15
Keighley	11
York	12
Featherstone Rovers	8
Castleford	9
Hunslet	26

Semifinals
Wakefield Trinity	14
Halifax	13
York	6
Hunslet	13

Final
Wakefield Trinity	23
Hunslet	5
