= Bob Kelly (rugby league) =

Irish Great Britain international rugby league footballer and coach

Personal information
- Full name: Robert Kelly
- Born: 1927 Tullamore, County Offaly, Ireland
- Died: January 2003 (aged 75) Bradford, England

Playing information
- Position: Prop, Second-row
Club
Years	Team	Pld	T	G	FG	P
1951–53	Keighley
1953–59	Wakefield Trinity
1959–59	Batley
	Total	0	0	0	0	0
Representative
Years	Team	Pld	T	G	FG	P
1955	Other Nationalities	2	0	0	0	0
1956	Great Britain	1	1	0	0	3

Coaching information
Club
Years	Team	Gms	W	D	L	W%
1962	Batley

Robert Kelly (1927 – January 2003) was an Irish professional rugby league footballer who played in the 1950s, and coached in the 1960s. He played at representative level for Great Britain and Other Nationalities, and at club level for Keighley, Wakefield Trinity (captain 1956–57 season), and Batley, as a prop, or second-row, and coached at club level for Batley.

== Early life ==
Kelly was born in 1927 in Tullamore, Ireland. He served in the British Army towards the end of the Second World War, and later joined the military police. After he was demobbed, Kelly settled in Keighley, England, where his sister also lived. He played association football and Gaelic football for a local team before being persuaded to give rugby league a try. He played at amateur level for Eastwood Tavern and Victoria Park, and was later invited for a trial with the town's professional rugby league club, Keighley RLFC, signing a contract in 1951.

== Rugby league career ==
=== Club career ===
Kelly played right-second-row in Keighley's 3-17 defeat by Wakefield Trinity in the 1951–52 Yorkshire Cup Final during the 1951–52 season at Fartown Ground, Huddersfield on Saturday 27 October 1951 in front of a crowd of 25,495. He was transferred to Wakefield Trinity in January 1953 in exchange for Harry Murphy.

Kelly played left-second-row and was captain in Wakefield Trinity's 23-5 victory over Hunslet in the 1956–57 Yorkshire Cup Final during the 1956–57 season at Headingley, Leeds on Saturday 20 October 1956 in front of a crowd of 31,147, and played left-second-row in the 20-24 defeat by Leeds in the 1958–59 Yorkshire Cup Final during the 1958–59 season at Odsal Stadium, Bradford on Saturday 18 October 1958.

Kelly played left-second-row in Wakefield Trinity’s 17–12 victory over Australia in the 1956–57 Kangaroo tour of Great Britain and France match at Belle Vue, Wakefield on Monday 10 December 1956.

=== International honours ===
Kelly won caps for Other Nationalities while at Wakefield Trinity in 1955 against England, and France, and represented Great Britain while at Wakefield Trinity in 1956 against France (non-Test match).

Along with William "Billy" Banks, Edward "Ted" Cahill, Gordon Haynes, Keith Holliday, William "Billy" Ivison, John McKeown, George Parsons and Edward "Ted" Slevin, Bob Kelly's only Great Britain appearance came against France prior to 1957, these matches were not considered as Test matches by the Rugby Football League, and consequently caps were not awarded.

== Coaching career ==
=== Club career ===
Bob Kelly was the coach of Batley from July 1962 to October 1962.

== Honoured by Rugby League Ireland ==
On 25 March 2004 six footballers were inducted into Rugby League Ireland's inaugural Hall of Fame at the Rugby League Heritage Centre in Huddersfield, they were; John "Jack" Daly (Huddersfield/Featherstone Rovers), Robert "Bob" Kelly (Keighley/Wakefield Trinity/Batley), Seamus McCallion (Halifax/Leeds/Bramley), Thomas "Tom" McKinney, (Salford/Warrington/St. Helens), Terry O'Connor (Salford/Wigan Warriors/Widnes Vikings), Patrick "Paddy" Reid (Huddersfield/Halifax).
