= George Parsons (rugby) =

GB & Wales dual-code rugby international footballer

Personal information
- Full name: George W. Parsons
- Born: 21 April 1926 Newbridge, Wales
- Died: November 2009 (aged 83) Llangynidr or Crickhowell, Wales

Playing information
- Weight: 14 st 0 lb (89 kg)

Rugby union
- Position: Lock
Club
Years	Team	Pld	T	G	FG	P
	Cardiff RFC
≤1945–45	Abertillery RFC
1945	Newport RFC	1
1945–46	Newbridge RFC
1946–47	Newport RFC	18
	Total	19	0	0	0	0
Representative
Years	Team	Pld	T	G	FG	P
1947	Wales	1

Rugby league
- Position: Second-row
Club
Years	Team	Pld	T	G	FG	P
1948–57	St. Helens	296	45	40	0	215
1957–58	Rochdale Hornets	52	4	0	0	12
1958–60	Salford	42	3	0	0	9
	Total	390	52	40	0	236
Representative
Years	Team	Pld	T	G	FG	P
1948–59	Wales	13	1	0	0	3
1951–53	Great Britain	2	1	0	0	3

Coaching information
Club
Years	Team	Gms	W	D	L	W%
1960–63	Salford	117	36	4	77	31

George W. Parsons (21 April 1926 – November 2009) was a Welsh dual-code international rugby union, and professional rugby league footballer who played in the 1940s and 1950s. He played representative level rugby union (RU) for Wales, and at club level for Abertillery RFC, Cardiff RFC, Newport RFC (two spells), and Newbridge RFC, as a lock, and representative level rugby league (RL) for Great Britain and Wales, and at club level for St. Helens, Rochdale Hornets and Salford, as a second-row. He coached Salford from 1960 to 1963.

== Playing career ==
=== International honours ===
George Parsons represented Wales XV (RU) while at Abertillery RFC in the 'Victory International' non-Test match(es) between December 1945 and April 1946, won a cap for Wales (RU) while at Newport RFC in 1947 against England, won caps for Wales (RL) while at St. Helens, and Salford.

Parsons also represented Great Britain (RL) while at St. Helens in 1951 against Australasia at Headingley in a Festival of Britain match, and in 1953 against France (1 non-Test match) in Lyons.

Along with William "Billy" Banks, Edward "Ted" Cahill, Gordon Haynes, Keith Holliday, William "Billy" Ivison, Robert "Bob" Kelly, John McKeown and Edward "Ted" Slevin, Parsons' only Great Britain appearance came against France prior to 1957, these matches were not considered as Test matches by the Rugby Football League, and consequently caps were not awarded.

=== Challenge Cup Final appearances ===
George Parsons played left-second-row in St. Helens' 10–15 defeat by Huddersfield in the 1953 Challenge Cup Final during the 1952–53 season at Wembley Stadium, London on Saturday 25 April 1953. and played left-second-row in the 13-2 victory over Halifax in the 1956 Challenge Cup Final during the 1955–56 season at Wembley Stadium, London on Saturday 28 April 1956, in front of a crowd of 79,341.

=== County Cup Final appearances ===
George Parsons played left-second-row in St. Helens' 5–22 defeat by Leigh in the 1952 Lancashire Cup Final during the 1952–53 season at Station Road, Swinton on Saturday 29 November 1952, played left-second-row in the 16–8 victory over Wigan in the 1953 Lancashire Cup Final during the 1953–54 season at Station Road, Swinton on Saturday 24 October 1953, played left-second-row in the 3–10 defeat by Oldham in the 1956 Lancashire Cup Final during the 1956–57 season at Central Park, Wigan on Saturday 20 October 1956.

== Honoured at St Helens R.F.C. ==
George Parsons is a St Helens R.F.C. Hall of Fame inductee.

== Outside of rugby ==
Parsons was a senior manager at the Pilkington glass factory in St. Helens, he was also a magistrate, and a Liberal Party councillor.
