= Armistead =

Armistead is both a surname and a masculine given name. Notable people with the name include:

Surname:

- Bill Armistead (born 1944), American politician from Alabama
- George Armistead (1780–1818), American military officer who served as the commander of Fort McHenry during the Battle of Baltimore in the War of 1812
- James Armistead, American slave and spy in the American Revolution
- Lewis Addison Armistead, Confederate Army general
- Samuel G. Armistead (1927–2013), American ethnographer, linguist, folklorist, historian and Hispanist
- Walker Keith Armistead, United States Army brigadier general
- Wilson Armistead, (1819–1868) British merchant, anti-slavery abolitionist and author

Given name:

- Armistead Abraham Lilly (1878–1956), American lawyer, politician, and businessperson
- Armistead Burt, U.S. Representative from South Carolina from 1843 to 1853
- Armistead I. Selden Jr., U.S. Representative from Alabama from 1953 to 1969
- Armistead Mason Dobie, legal educator and federal judge
- Armistead Maupin, American writer
- Armistead Burwell Smith IV, American musician, member of Pinback
- Armistead Thomson Mason, U.S. Senator from Virginia from 1816 to 1817
- Armistead (c. 1820–1844), slave of US President John Tyler, killed in the USS Princeton disaster

== See also ==
- Armistead, California, unincorporated community in Kern County
- Armistead Gardens, Baltimore
- Armstead
