= Alec Dockar =

GB & England international rugby league footballer

Personal information
- Full name: Alec Dockar
- Born: December 28, 1919
- Died: January 1, 1994 (aged 74)

Playing information
- Position: Loose forward
Club
Years	Team	Pld	T	G	FG	P
1937–53	Hull Kingston Rovers	255	52	134	0	424
1940–41	→ Halifax (guest)	18	6	2	0	22
1945	→ Hull F.C. (guest)	1	0	0	0	0
	Total	274	58	136	0	446
Representative
Years	Team	Pld	T	G	FG	P
1946–47	England	6	0	0	0	0
1947	Great Britain	1	0	0	0	0
1946	Rugby League XIII	1	2	0	0	6
1946–49	Yorkshire	4	1	0	0	3
- Relatives: Zach Dockar-Clay (great-grandson)

Alec Dockar (28 December 1919 – 1 January 1994) was an English professional rugby league footballer who played in the 1930s, 1940s and 1950s. He played at representative level for Great Britain and England, and at club level for Hull Kingston Rovers as a loose forward. During the Second World War he made guest appearances for Halifax and Hull F.C..

== Representative appearances ==
Dockar appeared for a Rugby League XIII against a Racing Club de Paris XIII game in Paris April 1946 after the Victory Internationals. Dockar scoring two tries in a 36–19 victory. Dockar made four appearances for Yorkshire in the County Championship between 1946 and 1949.

== International honours ==
Dockar won caps for England while at Hull Kingston Rovers in 1946 against Wales (2 matches), and France, in 1947 against France (2 matches), and Wales, and made a single appearance for Great Britain while at Hull Kingston Rovers in 1947 against New Zealand.

== Personal life ==
Dockar was the great-grandfather of the rugby league footballer who has played in the 2010s; Zach Dockar-Clay.
