= Ken Loxton =

GB international rugby league footballer

Personal information
- Full name: Kenneth Loxton
- Born: 23 September 1947 (age 78) Lower Agbrigg district, Wakefield, England

Playing information
- Position: Scrum-half, Loose forward
Club
Years	Team	Pld	T	G	FG	P
1965–73	Huddersfield	217	4	2	0	16
1973–78	Keighley	104	7
1978–82	Halifax	106	2	0	0	6
1982–83	Bramley	31	1	0	0	3
	Total	458	14	2	0	25
Representative
Years	Team	Pld	T	G	FG	P
1971	Great Britain	1	0	0	0	0

Kenneth Loxton (born 23 September 1947) is an English former professional rugby league footballer who played in the 1960s and 1970s. He played at representative level for Great Britain, and at club level for Huddersfield, Keighley, Halifax and Bramley as a scrum-half or loose forward.

== Background ==
Ken Loxton's birth was registered in Lower Agbrigg district, Wakefield, West Riding of Yorkshire, England.

== Playing career ==
=== Club career ===
Loxton joined Huddersfield from amateur club Normanton in 1965. He went on to play for Keighley, Halifax and Bramley.

=== International honours ===
Loxton won a cap for Great Britain while at Huddersfield in 1971 against New Zealand.

== Personal life ==
Loxton's cousin, Eric Loxton, played rugby league for Featherstone Rovers.
