= Ken Senior =

GB international rugby league footballer

Personal information
- Full name: Kenneth Senior
- Born: unknown

Playing information
- Position: Wing
Club
Years	Team	Pld	T	G	FG	P
1962–79	Huddersfield	476	213
Representative
Years	Team	Pld	T	G	FG	P
1965	Yorkshire	2	1	0	0	3
1965	Great Britain U-24	1	1	0	0	3
1965–67	Great Britain	2	0	0	0	0

Kenneth Senior (birth unknown) is an English former professional rugby league footballer who played in the 1960s and 1970s. He played at representative level for Great Britain and Yorkshire, and at club level for Huddersfield, as a wing.

== International honours ==
On 3 April 1965, Senior played in the first ever Great Britain under-24 international match in a 17–9 win against France under-24's.

Senior won caps for Great Britain while at Huddersfield in 1965 against New Zealand, and in 1967 against France.
