= Peter Armstead =

English rugby league footballer (born 1934)

Personal information
- Born: first ¼ 1934 (age 91–92) Dewsbury, England

Playing information
- Position: Second-row
Club
Years	Team	Pld	T	G	FG	P
1953–57	Wakefield Trinity	58	6	0	0	18
1957–61	Batley	87	7
	Total	145	13	0	0	18

Peter Armstead (birth registered first ¼ 1934) is an English former professional rugby league footballer who played in the 1950s. He played at club level for Wakefield Trinity and Batley, as a second-row.

== Background ==
Peter Armstead's birth was registered in Dewsbury, West Riding of Yorkshire, England.

== Playing career ==
=== County Cup Final appearances ===
Peter Armstead played at second-row in Wakefield Trinity's 23–5 victory over Hunslet in the 1956–57 Yorkshire Cup Final during the 1956–57 season at Headingley, Leeds on Saturday 20 October 1956.

=== Notable tour matches ===
Peter Armstead played at second-row in Wakefield Trinity's 17–12 victory over Australia in the 1956–57 Kangaroo tour of Great Britain and France match at Belle Vue, Wakefield on Monday 10 December 1956.
