= Test match (rugby league) =

Obsolete term for an international match

A test match is a historical term used in rugby league football which has no official use with the sports global governing body – the International Rugby League (IRL).

The term predates the creation of the IRL, thus every national governing body has slightly varying definitions which has changed throughout history. As such, it is possible for a game to have test status in one nation but not the other. The Rugby Football League (RFL), the governing body in England and first governing body of the sport, currently defines a "Test Match" as "a game of Rugby League Football played between teams representing members of the IRL".

The first official test match took place on 1 January 1908 when Wales defeated New Zealand 9–8 at the Aberdare Athletic Ground in Aberdare, Wales in front of approximately 15,000 fans. The match was the 29th game of the 1907–08 All Golds tour.

== Examples of differences in recognition ==
A notable instance of a different in opinions of the status of past matches is a consequence of the Super League war. The Australian Rugby League does not recognise the games played in 1997 by the Australian Super League side against Great Britain and New Zealand. The three sides were representing members of the Super League International Board, the ARL's rival. The five matches, two against New Zealand (the inaugural Anzac test and an end of season match) and a three test tour of England against Great Britain (Super League Test series) are recognised by the Rugby League International Federation, Rugby Football League and New Zealand Rugby League as tests. There have been calls for the Super League Tests to be included in the ARL's records but ARL Chief Executive Geoff Carr said in 2010, "All historians, and the NRL, agree this is the way it should be treated". ARL historian David Middleton has stated that those players who joined Super League did so in the knowledge that they were forfeiting their chance of representing the established national team.
