= List of Western Suburbs Magpies players =

This is a list of rugby league footballers who played first-grade for the Western Suburbs Magpies. Players are listed in the order they made their debut.

== First-grade players (1908–1999) ==
Club
| No. | Name | Career | Appearances | Tries | Goals | Field goals | Points |
|---|---|---|---|---|---|---|---|
| 1 | Jim Abercrombie | 1908–1913 | 12 | 0 | 5 | 0 | 10 |
| 2 | C Blake | 1908–1909 | 2 | 0 | 0 | 0 | 0 |
| 3 | A Brown | 1908 | 7 | 1 | 0 | 0 | 3 |
| 4 | George Duffin | 1908, 1911 | 5 | 0 | 0 | 0 | 0 |
| 5 | B Duggan | 1908 | 4 | 0 | 0 | 0 | 0 |
| 6 | Bill Elliott | 1908–1911 | 22 | 0 | 0 | 0 | 0 |
| 7 | Percy Franks | 1908–1911 | 16 | 0 | 0 | 0 | 0 |
| 8 | Lucien Gormley | 1908 | 1 | 0 | 0 | 0 | 0 |
| 9 | Ray Gormley | 1908–1910 | 19 | 3 | 0 | 0 | 9 |
| 10 | Ted Mead | 1908–1912 | 46 | 4 | 0 | 0 | 12 |
| 11 | T Mount | 1908 | 5 | 0 | 0 | 0 | 0 |
| 12 | Tom Phelan | 1908–1909 | 14 | 1 | 0 | 0 | 3 |
| 13 | Jim Stack | 1908–1911 | 12 | 3 | 0 | 0 | 9 |
| 14 | Les Byewell | 1908 | 1 | 0 | 0 | 0 | 0 |
| 15 | R Ellis | 1908–1909 | 16 | 0 | 2 | 0 | 4 |
| 16 | Charles Luhr | 1908–1910 | 6 | 0 | 0 | 0 | 0 |
| 17 | T Watkins | 1908 | 1 | 0 | 0 | 0 | 0 |
| 18 | E Ellis | 1908 | 7 | 0 | 0 | 0 | 0 |
| 19 | Boyleau | 1908 | 1 | 0 | 0 | 0 | 0 |
| 20 | Claude McFayden | 1908–1916 | 92 | 18 | 0 | 0 | 54 |
| 21 | N Booth | 1908 | 1 | 0 | 0 | 0 | 0 |
| 22 | Charlie Elliott | 1908–1909 | 3 | 0 | 0 | 0 | 0 |
| 23 | J Frost | 1908 | 5 | 1 | 0 | 0 | 3 |
| 24 | J Hodgson | 1908 | 5 | 1 | 5 | 0 | 13 |
| 25 | S Gilbert | 1908 | 2 | 0 | 0 | 0 | 0 |
| 26 | E Holloway | 1908–1909 | 4 | 0 | 0 | 0 | 0 |
| 27 | J Herrington | 1908–1909 | 8 | 0 | 0 | 0 | 0 |
| 28 | A Abbott | 1909 | 1 | 0 | 0 | 0 | 0 |
| 29 | Harry Bloomfield | 1909 | 4 | 0 | 2 | 0 | 4 |
| 30 | F Casey | 1909 | 4 | 0 | 0 | 0 | 0 |
| 31 | Albert Halling | 1909–1910 | 5 | 0 | 0 | 0 | 0 |
| 32 | R Meredith | 1909 | 1 | 0 | 0 | 0 | 0 |
| 33 | J Spears | 1909 | 8 | 2 | 1 | 0 | 8 |
| 34 | T Wallis | 1909 | 6 | 1 | 0 | 0 | 3 |
| 35 | H Boyle | 1909 | 1 | 0 | 0 | 0 | 0 |
| 36 | Edward Bellamy | 1909 | 1 | 0 | 0 | 0 | 0 |
| 37 | Albert Burdus | 1909–1917 | 16 | 2 | 0 | 0 | 6 |
| 38 | Tedda Courtney | 1909, 1911–1924 | 180 | 39 | 1 | 0 | 119 |
| 39 | S Duncan | 1909 | 1 | 0 | 0 | 0 | 0 |
| 40 | Bill Medcalf | 1909–1914 | 43 | 0 | 56 | 1 | 114 |
| 41 | V Sands | 1909 | 2 | 0 | 0 | 0 | 0 |
| 42 | C Blake | 1909 | 1 | 0 | 0 | 0 | 0 |
| 43 | E Gulliver | 1909 | 1 | 0 | 0 | 0 | 0 |
| 44 | E Fletcher | 1909 | 4 | 1 | 0 | 0 | 3 |
| 45 | G Shaw | 1909–1913 | 7 | 0 | 0 | 0 | 0 |
| 46 | W Wenban | 1909 | 2 | 0 | 0 | 0 | 0 |
| 47 | C Clifford | 1909 | 1 | 0 | 0 | 0 | 0 |
| 48 | P Scotten | 1909–1910 | 2 | 0 | 0 | 0 | 0 |
| 49 | Arthur McCallum | 1909 | 1 | 0 | 0 | 0 | 0 |
| 50 | Harold R. Thompson | 1909–1911 | 10 | 4 | 1 | 0 | 14 |
| 51 | H Kemp | 1909 | 1 | 0 | 0 | 0 | 0 |
| 52 | W Moore | 1909 | 1 | 0 | 0 | 0 | 0 |
| 53 | William Thrussell | 1909 | 1 | 0 | 0 | 0 | 0 |
| 54 | W Wright | 1909 | 1 | 0 | 0 | 0 | 0 |
| 55 | W Barclay | 1910 | 9 | 1 | 0 | 0 | 3 |
| 56 | Percy Bolt | 1910 | 8 | 0 | 0 | 0 | 0 |
| 57 | T Doyle | 1910 | 10 | 1 | 0 | 0 | 3 |
| 58 | Jasper Feeney | 1910 | 13 | 1 | 0 | 0 | 3 |
| 59 | V Jarvis | 1910 | 6 | 0 | 0 | 0 | 0 |
| 60 | E Mantle | 1910 | 8 | 0 | 0 | 0 | 0 |
| 61 | Henry Naylor | 1910–1916 | 72 | 16 | 4 | 0 | 56 |
| 62 | Walter Palmer | 1910, 1918 | 22 | 0 | 0 | 0 | 0 |
| 63 | E Willings | 1910 | 7 | 1 | 0 | 0 | 3 |
| 64 | Grinstead | 1910 | 1 | 0 | 0 | 0 | 0 |
| 65 | Owens | 1910 | 2 | 0 | 0 | 0 | 0 |
| 66 | Sam Perry | 1910–1911 | 24 | 6 | 0 | 0 | 18 |
| 67 | Keen | 1910 | 2 | 0 | 0 | 0 | 0 |
| 68 | J James | 1910 | 1 | 0 | 0 | 0 | 0 |
| 69 | Percy Briscoe | 1910 | 2 | 0 | 0 | 0 | 0 |
| 70 | Chipperfield | 1910 | 2 | 0 | 0 | 0 | 0 |
| 71 | J Ogilvie | 1910 | 4 | 0 | 0 | 0 | 0 |
| 72 | Horace Alderson | 1910–1912 | 7 | 0 | 0 | 0 | 0 |
| 73 | Johns | 1910 | 1 | 0 | 0 | 0 | 0 |
| 74 | J Slingsby | 1910 | 1 | 0 | 0 | 0 | 0 |
| 75 | D McDonald | 1910 | 4 | 0 | 0 | 0 | 0 |
| 76 | G Patterson | 1910–1912 | 7 | 2 | 0 | 0 | 6 |
| 77 | Baldock | 1910 | 3 | 0 | 2 | 0 | 4 |
| 78 | Tom Dowswell | 1910, 1917 | 4 | 0 | 0 | 0 | 0 |
| 79 | Healy | 1910 | 3 | 0 | 0 | 0 | 0 |
| 80 | McEvoy | 1910 | 1 | 0 | 0 | 0 | 0 |
| 81 | Ryan | 1910 | 1 | 0 | 0 | 0 | 0 |
| 82 | Herb Gilbert | 1911, 1917–1920 | 54 | 23 | 0 | 0 | 29 |
| 83 | Rangi Joass | 1911–1922 | 138 | 13 | 1 | 0 | 41 |
| 84 | W Mueller | 1911–1912 | 19 | 1 | 1 | 0 | 5 |
| 85 | A Munnery | 1911 | 4 | 0 | 0 | 0 | 0 |
| 86 | P.J. Thompson | 1911–1913 | 9 | 0 | 0 | 0 | 0 |
| 87 | Jack Tully | 1911–1912 | 15 | 1 | 0 | 0 | 3 |
| 88 | S.B. Wall | 1911–1912 | 22 | 6 | 0 | 0 | 18 |
| 89 | A Gillett | 1911–1914 | 28 | 1 | 0 | 0 | 3 |
| 90 | Alf Joass | 1911–1913 | 27 | 6 | 7 | 0 | 32 |
| 91 | Dick Moroney | 1911 | 1 | 0 | 0 | 0 | 0 |
| 92 | V West | 1911–1913 | 21 | 3 | 0 | 0 | 9 |
| 93 | Oliver Griffin | 1911 | 2 | 0 | 0 | 0 | 0 |
| 94 | A Paterson | 1911 | 3 | 1 | 0 | 0 | 3 |
| 95 | A Stack | 1911 | 1 | 0 | 0 | 0 | 0 |
| 96 | Tom Alpen | 1912 | 3 | 0 | 0 | 0 | 0 |
| 97 | Harold Bissett | 1912–1914 | 16 | 2 | 0 | 0 | 6 |
| 98 | S Dennis | 1912–1916 | 4 | 0 | 0 | 0 | 0 |
| 99 | E.S Williams | 1912 | 5 | 0 | 0 | 0 | 0 |
| 100 | Albert Conlon | 1912 | 8 | 1 | 1 | 0 | 5 |
| 101 | G Holt | 1912–1913 | 12 | 0 | 0 | 0 | 0 |
| 102 | George Alderson | 1912 | 1 | 0 | 0 | 0 | 0 |
| 103 | Thackeray | 1912 | 1 | 0 | 0 | 0 | 0 |
| 104 | Stuart | 1912 | 1 | 0 | 0 | 0 | 0 |
| 105 | B Webster | 1912 | 5 | 0 | 0 | 0 | 0 |
| 106 | Ray Steward | 1912–1914 | 30 | 9 | 2 | 0 | 31 |
| 107 | Bertram Alderson | 1912 | 1 | 0 | 0 | 0 | 0 |
| 108 | W Gander | 1912–1913 | 7 | 0 | 0 | 0 | 0 |
| 109 | Westley Easterbrook | 1912–1922 | 54 | 12 | 0 | 0 | 36 |
| 110 | Hearn | 1912 | 1 | 0 | 0 | 0 | 0 |
| 111 | C Lucky | 1912 | 2 | 0 | 0 | 0 | 0 |
| 112 | Cecil Foord | 1912–1915 | 22 | 3 | 0 | 0 | 9 |
| 113 | Charles Rothwell | 1912–1915 | 6 | 2 | 0 | 0 | 6 |
| 114 | S Carr | 1913 | 6 | 0 | 0 | 0 | 0 |
| 115 | W Foord | 1913 | 12 | 3 | 6 | 0 | 21 |
| 116 | Eddie Griffiths | 1913–1914 | 6 | 5 | 0 | 0 | 10 |
| 117 | J Lindsay | 1913 | 2 | 0 | 0 | 0 | 0 |
| 118 | Johnno Stuntz | 1913 | 4 | 3 | 1 | 0 | 11 |
| 119 | George Gagen | 1913–1917 | 24 | 4 | 14 | 0 | 40 |
| 120 | V Masters | 1913 | 1 | 0 | 0 | 0 | 0 |
| 121 | Harry Clarke | 1913–1914 | 23 | 0 | 1 | 0 | 2 |
| 122 | L West | 1913 | 1 | 0 | 0 | 0 | 0 |
| 123 | Henry McIllmurray | 1913–1914 | 18 | 2 | 3 | 0 | 12 |
| 124 | A Rose | 1913 | 1 | 0 | 0 | 0 | 0 |
| 125 | Fred Lane | 1913–1925 | 25 | 0 | 0 | 0 | 0 |
| 126 | E Maxworthy | 1913 | 1 | 0 | 0 | 0 | 0 |
| 127 | W Warby | 1913 | 2 | 0 | 0 | 0 | 0 |
| 128 | J Freeman | 1913–1914 | 3 | 0 | 1 | 0 | 2 |
| 129 | H Sly | 1913–1914 | 6 | 1 | 0 | 0 | 3 |
| 130 | W Weigan | 1913 | 1 | 0 | 0 | 0 | 0 |
| 131 | Harrington | 1913 | 1 | 0 | 0 | 0 | 0 |
| 132 | W Anderton | 1914–1915 | 23 | 2 | 0 | 0 | 6 |
| 133 | Charlie Collier | 1914 | 11 | 0 | 1 | 0 | 2 |
| 134 | Jack Nicholson | 1914 | 7 | 0 | 0 | 0 | 0 |
| 135 | R Tremain | 1914 | 1 | 0 | 0 | 0 | 0 |
| 136 | Clarrie Tye | 1914–1920 | 58 | 7 | 0 | 0 | 21 |
| 137 | E Mason | 1914 | 5 | 0 | 0 | 0 | 0 |
| 138 | Dick Watson | 1914 | 2 | 0 | 0 | 0 | 0 |
| 139 | N Williams | 1914 | 1 | 0 | 0 | 0 | 0 |
| 140 | R Upton | 1914 | 2 | 0 | 0 | 0 | 0 |
| 141 | F Holt | 1914–1917 | 35 | 9 | 4 | 0 | 35 |
| 142 | Dick Vest | 1914–1923 | 85 | 22 | 8 | 0 | 82 |
| 143 | Harold Leddy | 1915–1924 | 94 | 29 | 0 | 0 | 87 |
| 144 | Tom McCauley | 1915–1921 | 32 | 16 | 0 | 0 | 48 |
| 145 | A Mitchell | 1915 | 3 | 0 | 0 | 0 | 0 |
| 146 | Archie Prentice | 1915–1916 | 27 | 1 | 3 | 0 | 9 |
| 147 | Clarrie Prentice | 1915–1924 | 115 | 22 | 7 | 0 | 80 |
| 148 | W.L. Simpson | 1915 | 12 | 6 | 0 | 0 | 18 |
| 149 | A Smith | 1915–1916 | 24 | 0 | 0 | 0 | 0 |
| 150 | Athol White | 1915–1921 | 75 | 7 | 12 | 1 | 47 |
| 151 | Billy Connelly | 1915–1919 | 17 | 1 | 4 | 0 | 11 |
| 152 | Alf Bossi | 1915–1920 | 35 | 9 | 0 | 0 | 27 |
| 153 | G Hastie | 1915 | 1 | 0 | 0 | 0 | 0 |
| 154 | G Viles | 1915 | 6 | 0 | 0 | 0 | 0 |
| 155 | D Woodward | 1915 | 1 | 0 | 0 | 0 | 0 |
| 156 | A McPherson | 1916–1920 | 54 | 12 | 99 | 0 | 234 |
| 157 | Roy Norman | 1916 | 3 | 0 | 0 | 0 | 0 |
| 158 | Pat Carroll | 1916–1917 | 13 | 0 | 0 | 0 | 0 |
| 159 | Harold Lee | 1916–1917 | 13 | 0 | 0 | 0 | 0 |
| 160 | S Langley | 1916 | 1 | 0 | 0 | 0 | 0 |
| 161 | F Large | 1916 | 2 | 0 | 0 | 0 | 0 |
| 162 | R Swanson | 1916–1917 | 4 | 1 | 0 | 0 | 3 |
| 163 | E Johnson | 1916 | 1 | 0 | 0 | 0 | 0 |
| 164 | P Burns | 1917–1920 | 28 | 7 | 0 | 0 | 21 |
| 165 | George Potter | 1917 | 1 | 0 | 0 | 0 | 0 |
| 166 | Tony Redmond | 1917–1920, 1924 | 44 | 3 | 4 | 0 | 17 |
| 167 | Ted Boland | 1917–1918 | 14 | 4 | 0 | 0 | 12 |
| 168 | Charles Ashworth | 1917 | 2 | 0 | 0 | 0 | 0 |
| 169 | Harold Holmes | 1917 | 1 | 1 | 0 | 0 | 3 |
| 170 | Roy Bossi | 1917–1921 | 6 | 0 | 0 | 0 | 0 |
| 171 | S.D. Matthews | 1917 | 3 | 1 | 0 | 0 | 3 |
| 172 | Joe Reidy | 1917–1922 | 27 | 1 | 0 | 0 | 3 |
| 173 | Wally Collins | 1918–1924 | 80 | 52 | 0 | 0 | 156 |
| 174 | Albert Johnston | 1918 | 9 | 0 | 0 | 0 | 0 |
| 175 | George McGowan | 1919–1922 | 24 | 4 | 2 | 0 | 16 |
| 176 | W Matthews | 1919–1922 | 5 | 1 | 0 | 0 | 3 |
| 177 | Patrick McCue | 1919 | 1 | 0 | 0 | 0 | 0 |
| 178 | Bill Lucas | 1919 | 2 | 0 | 0 | 0 | 0 |
| 179 | Roy Farnsworth | 1919 | 4 | 0 | 0 | 0 | 0 |
| 180 | Gordon Stettler | 1919–1926 | 46 | 18 | 45 | 0 | 144 |
| 181 | Viv Farnsworth | 1920–1921 | 11 | 6 | 0 | 0 | 18 |
| 182 | Ward Prentice | 1920 | 5 | 1 | 4 | 0 | 11 |
| 183 | Lyall Wall | 1920 | 14 | 3 | 26 | 1 | 63 |
| 184 | Harry Tancred | 1920 | 8 | 4 | 0 | 0 | 12 |
| 185 | Frank Gray | 1920 | 4 | 6 | 0 | 0 | 18 |
| 186 | G Bossi | 1920 | 1 | 0 | 0 | 0 | 0 |
| 187 | Edward Burnicle | 1921 | 2 | 0 | 0 | 0 | 0 |
| 188 | Frank McMillan | 1921–1924, 1926–1935 | 147 | 8 | 103 | 3 | 236 |
| 189 | Eric Doig | 1921–1926 | 67 | 11 | 76 | 0 | 3 |
| 190 | R Howell | 1921 | 3 | 0 | 0 | 0 | 0 |
| 191 | J Plumb | 1921 | 2 | 1 | 0 | 0 | 3 |
| 192 | E Stapleton | 1921–1926 | 40 | 2 | 0 | 0 | 6 |
| 193 | Frank Burridge | 1921 | 1 | 0 | 0 | 0 | 0 |
| 194 | J Ryan | 1921 | 3 | 1 | 0 | 0 | 3 |
| 195 | R Walker | 1921 | 2 | 0 | 0 | 0 | 0 |
| 196 | Tedda Brooks | 1922 | 11 | 1 | 0 | 0 | 3 |
| 197 | H Haylock | 1922 | 5 | 1 | 0 | 0 | 3 |
| 198 | Louis Yanz | 1922–1924 | 35 | 1 | 0 | 0 | 3 |
| 199 | F Young | 1922 | 1 | 0 | 0 | 0 | 0 |
| 200 | Jack Drew | 1922–1927 | 79 | 9 | 1 | 0 | 29 |
| 201 | Fred Yanz Sr. | 1922–1928 | 41 | 11 | 0 | 0 | 33 |
| 202 | Wade Lane | 1922 | 1 | 0 | 0 | 0 | 0 |
| 203 | R Dark | 1922–1923 | 2 | 0 | 0 | 0 | 0 |
| 204 | Neil Matterson | 1922–1929 | 68 | 22 | 0 | 0 | 66 |
| 205 | J Walker | 1922 | 1 | 0 | 0 | 0 | 0 |
| 206 | Cyril Bellamy | 1922–1928 | 41 | 19 | 0 | 0 | 57 |
| 207 | Arthur Mendel | 1922–1924 | 14 | 0 | 0 | 0 | 0 |
| 208 | Cec Fifield | 1923–1929, 1938 | 48 | 12 | 0 | 0 | 36 |
| 209 | W McCabe | 1923 | 6 | 2 | 0 | 0 | 6 |
| 210 | Bob Lindfield | 1923–1934 | 137 | 9 | 0 | 0 | 27 |
| 211 | Bill Carpenter | 1923–1932 | 59 | 5 | 0 | 0 | 15 |
| 212 | Jerry Brien | 1923–1928 | 38 | 8 | 1 | 0 | 26 |
| 213 | Joe Mansted | 1924–1926 | 42 | 9 | 0 | 0 | 27 |
| 214 | F Elliott | 1924 | 3 | 0 | 0 | 0 | 0 |
| 215 | Ed Courtney Jr. | 1924–1929 | 29 | 10 | 1 | 0 | 32 |
| 216 | Frank Matterson | 1924–1933 | 91 | 29 | 0 | 0 | 87 |
| 217 | Frank McCauley | 1924–1925 | 13 | 2 | 0 | 0 | 6 |
| 218 | R Ives | 1924 | 1 | 0 | 0 | 0 | 0 |
| 219 | George Daisley | 1925–1927 | 13 | 0 | 7 | 1 | 16 |
| 220 | C Gilbert | 1925–1926 | 5 | 0 | 0 | 0 | 0 |
| 221 | C Flint | 1926 | 2 | 0 | 0 | 0 | 0 |
| 222 | Jim Parsons | 1926–1929 | 49 | 15 | 0 | 0 | 45 |
| 223 | Jack Redmond | 1926–1929 | 50 | 31 | 0 | 0 | 93 |
| 224 | C Stapleton | 1926 | 1 | 0 | 0 | 0 | 0 |
| 225 | Frank Spillane | 1926–1932 | 74 | 21 | 1 | 0 | 65 |
| 226 | Jack Holmes | 1926 | 6 | 4 | 0 | 0 | 12 |
| 227 | Jack Peterson | 1926–1930 | 6 | 0 | 0 | 0 | 0 |
| 228 | Harry Owen | 1926–1933 | 34 | 10 | 27 | 0 | 84 |
| 229 | Roy Liston | 1926–1928 | 8 | 0 | 2 | 0 | 4 |
| 230 | R Wheldon | 1926–1928 | 5 | 0 | 0 | 0 | 0 |
| 231 | Cecil Rhodes | 1926–1933 | 79 | 14 | 0 | 0 | 42 |
| 232 | Dave Hey | 1926–1929 | 24 | 10 | 0 | 0 | 30 |
| 233 | Les Dolan | 1927 | 5 | 0 | 0 | 0 | 0 |
| 234 | Les Hayes | 1927–1928 | 19 | 9 | 0 | 0 | 27 |
| 235 | Ken Sherwood | 1927–1932 | 69 | 19 | 5 | 0 | 67 |
| 236 | G Cameron | 1927 | 1 | 0 | 0 | 0 | 0 |
| 237 | F Bartley | 1927 | 1 | 0 | 0 | 0 | 0 |
| 238 | W McPherson | 1927 | 4 | 1 | 0 | 0 | 3 |
| 239 | George Mason | 1927–1929 | 31 | 5 | 0 | 0 | 15 |
| 240 | Harry Tisdale | 1927 | 1 | 0 | 0 | 0 | 0 |
| 241 | Ray Morris | 1927–1932 | 52 | 29 | 0 | 0 | 87 |
| 242 | Tom Stanton | 1927–1928 | 2 | 0 | 1 | 0 | 2 |
| 243 | Jack Thompson | 1927–1929 | 14 | 2 | 0 | 0 | 6 |
| 244 | Allan Adams | 1928–1929 | 15 | 2 | 19 | 0 | 44 |
| 245 | Leo Joyce | 1928 | 4 | 2 | 0 | 0 | 6 |
| 246 | Walter Anderton | 1928 | 1 | 0 | 0 | 0 | 0 |
| 247 | Jack Matterson | 1928–1929 | 2 | 0 | 0 | 0 | 0 |
| 248 | Jack Peterson | 1928–1930 | 5 | 0 | 0 | 0 | 0 |
| 249 | J McKee | 1928 | 3 | 0 | 1 | 0 | 2 |
| 250 | Frank Boyd | 1928–1929 | 3 | 0 | 0 | 0 | 0 |
| 251 | Jack Kelly | 1928, 1930 | 3 | 0 | 0 | 0 | 0 |
| 252 | H Miller | 1928 | 1 | 0 | 0 | 0 | 0 |
| 253 | Alan Brady | 1929–1935 | 95 | 56 | 0 | 0 | 168 |
| 254 | William Brogan | 1929–1933 | 64 | 8 | 6 | 0 | 36 |
| 255 | Jim Craig | 1929–1930 | 32 | 6 | 77 | 0 | 172 |
| 256 | N McNee | 1929 | 3 | 0 | 0 | 0 | 0 |
| 257 | L Roberts | 1929–1931 | 4 | 0 | 0 | 0 | 0 |
| 258 | N Booth | 1929–1930 | 5 | 0 | 0 | 0 | 0 |
| 259 | Cliff Pearce | 1929–1937 | 79 | 26 | 9 | 0 | 96 |
| 260 | Vince Dwyer | 1929 | 2 | 1 | 0 | 0 | 3 |
| 261 | Norm Johnson | 1930–1931 | 9 | 4 | 0 | 0 | 12 |
| 262 | Les Mead | 1930–1941 | 77 | 30 | 172 | 0 | 434 |
| 263 | Charlie Cornwell | 1930–1934 | 72 | 25 | 38 | 0 | 151 |
| 264 | Harold Rigby | 1930–1931 | 11 | 3 | 0 | 0 | 9 |
| 265 | Jack Rosa | 1930–1931 | 15 | 4 | 0 | 0 | 12 |
| 266 | Vince Hughes | 1930–1931 | 3 | 1 | 0 | 0 | 3 |
| 267 | Bert Green | 1931–1936 | 21 | 1 | 0 | 0 | 3 |
| 268 | Alan Ridley | 1931–1936 | 64 | 64 | 1 | 0 | 194 |
| 269 | Cec Anderton | 1931–1933 | 11 | 2 | 1 | 0 | 8 |
| 270 | Harry Cameron | 1931–1933 | 17 | 2 | 0 | 0 | 6 |
| 271 | Bill Ryan | 1931–1932 | 16 | 5 | 3 | 0 | 21 |
| 272 | Dick Davis | 1931–1933 | 6 | 0 | 0 | 0 | 0 |
| 273 | Charlie Wrench | 1931–1933 | 13 | 4 | 0 | 0 | 12 |
| 274 | Clyde Cant | 1931–1932 | 4 | 2 | 0 | 0 | 4 |
| 275 | R McMillan | 1932 | 1 | 0 | 0 | 0 | 0 |
| 276 | Jack McGlinn | 1932–1933 | 19 | 4 | 0 | 0 | 12 |
| 277 | Frank Sponberg | 1932–1934 | 38 | 5 | 0 | 0 | 15 |
| 278 | H Rankine | 1932 | 2 | 2 | 0 | 0 | 6 |
| 279 | Vic Hey | 1933–1935 | 28 | 18 | 1 | 0 | 56 |
| 280 | R Shepherd | 1933 | 1 | 0 | 0 | 0 | 0 |
| 281 | Stan Tancred | 1933–1937 | 48 | 18 | 0 | 0 | 54 |
| 282 | Jack McConnell | 1933–1934 | 29 | 2 | 0 | 0 | 6 |
| 283 | Les Midson | 1933–1938 | 13 | 6 | 0 | 0 | 18 |
| 284 | W McLeod | 1933–1936 | 12 | 3 | 0 | 0 | 9 |
| 285 | Sid Elliott | 1933 | 1 | 0 | 0 | 0 | 0 |
| 286 | Bill Howes | 1933 | 2 | 0 | 0 | 0 | 0 |
| 287 | Alan Blake | 1933–1935 | 24 | 1 | 0 | 0 | 4 |
| 288 | S Palmer | 1933 | 1 | 0 | 0 | 0 | 0 |
| 289 | Sen Black | 1933 | 4 | 0 | 0 | 0 | 0 |
| 290 | Tom Magnus | 1933 | 4 | 0 | 0 | 0 | 0 |
| 291 | Albert McGuinness | 1933–1943 | 98 | 25 | 17 | 0 | 109 |
| 292 | L Hancock | 1933 | 1 | 0 | 0 | 0 | 0 |
| 293 | Cliff Deegan | 1933–1935 | 3 | 0 | 0 | 0 | 0 |
| 294 | M Smith | 1933 | 1 | 0 | 1 | 0 | 2 |
| 295 | Max Gray | 1934–1940 | 45 | 7 | 0 | 0 | 21 |
| 296 | Ray Hancock | 1934 | 5 | 0 | 0 | 0 | 0 |
| 297 | Vince Sheehan | 1934–1936 | 41 | 20 | 0 | 0 | 60 |
| 298 | George Sherry | 1934–1935 | 5 | 0 | 0 | 0 | 0 |
| 299 | Ray Hines | 1934–1937 | 25 | 15 | 0 | 0 | 45 |
| 300 | Jack Hartwell Sr. | 1934 | 2 | 0 | 0 | 0 | 0 |
| 301 | Alec McDonald | 1934 | 4 | 2 | 7 | 0 | 20 |
| 302 | Jimmy Sharman | 1934–1939 | 59 | 4 | 19 | 0 | 50 |
| 303 | Lionel Frappell | 1934 | 2 | 0 | 0 | 0 | 0 |
| 304 | Don Murray | 1934–1939 | 30 | 5 | 0 | 0 | 15 |
| 305 | Ron Eaton | 1935 | 12 | 2 | 0 | 0 | 6 |
| 306 | Jack Kingston | 1935 | 3 | 0 | 0 | 0 | 0 |
| 307 | Gordon Pugh | 1935 | 11 | 0 | 0 | 0 | 0 |
| 308 | Athol Smith | 1935–1938 | 45 | 13 | 0 | 0 | 39 |
| 309 | Vince Cleary | 1935–1936 | 15 | 1 | 1 | 0 | 5 |
| 310 | Bob Allison | 1935–1936 | 7 | 2 | 0 | 0 | 6 |
| 311 | Jack Spillane | 1935–1936 | 7 | 1 | 0 | 0 | 3 |
| 312 | Fred Comber | 1935–1938 | 10 | 8 | 0 | 0 | 24 |
| 313 | Billy Wheeler | 1935–1936 | 12 | 0 | 0 | 0 | 0 |
| 314 | H Hannan | 1935 | 2 | 0 | 0 | 0 | 0 |
| 315 | Bill Purcell | 1935–1939 | 13 | 3 | 0 | 0 | 9 |
| 316 | R Waldon | 1935–1945 | 28 | 1 | 0 | 0 | 3 |
| 317 | Ray Gillam | 1936–1937 | 20 | 4 | 0 | 0 | 12 |
| 318 | Mick Shields | 1936 | 4 | 1 | 0 | 0 | 3 |
| 319 | Pat White | 1936–1937 | 12 | 3 | 1 | 0 | 11 |
| 320 | Jack Arnold | 1936 | 4 | 0 | 1 | 0 | 2 |
| 321 | Stan Simpson | 1936–1940 | 20 | 4 | 39 | 0 | 90 |
| 322 | Edward Mewton | 1936–1942 | 29 | 2 | 0 | 0 | 6 |
| 323 | Andy Gleeson | 1936–1938 | 16 | 4 | 0 | 0 | 12 |
| 324 | Doug Wilson | 1936 | 1 | 0 | 0 | 0 | 0 |
| 325 | Don Gulliver | 1937–1940 | 38 | 5 | 0 | 0 | 15 |
| 326 | Herbert Haar | 1937 | 8 | 0 | 0 | 0 | 0 |
| 327 | Jack Knox | 1937 | 9 | 1 | 0 | 0 | 3 |
| 328 | E Murphy | 1937 | 1 | 0 | 0 | 0 | 0 |
| 329 | Ken Lock | 1937–1941 | 51 | 7 | 0 | 0 | 21 |
| 330 | Jack Schuback | 1937–1942 | 39 | 9 | 0 | 0 | 27 |
| 331 | Fred Baber | 1938–1940 | 23 | 8 | 0 | 0 | 24 |
| 332 | Lew Fisher | 1938 | 1 | 0 | 0 | 0 | 0 |
| 333 | George Lucas | 1938–1944 | 46 | 11 | 0 | 0 | 33 |
| 334 | James Marks | 1938 | 2 | 0 | 0 | 0 | 0 |
| 335 | E Martin | 1938 | 3 | 0 | 0 | 0 | 0 |
| 336 | Colin Fewtrell | 1938–1942 | 43 | 12 | 0 | 0 | 36 |
| 337 | Jack Rubinson | 1938 | 4 | 0 | 0 | 0 | 0 |
| 338 | Phil Cooper | 1938–1940 | 3 | 0 | 0 | 0 | 0 |
| 339 | Bill Keato | 1938–1950 | 119 | 6 | 379 | 0 | 776 |
| 340 | Fred McKean | 1939–1944 | 51 | 6 | 1 | 0 | 20 |
| 341 | O Mitchell | 1939 | 1 | 0 | 0 | 0 | 0 |
| 342 | Dave Colless | 1939–1940 | 4 | 0 | 0 | 0 | 0 |
| 343 | Ron Ackling | 1939 | 1 | 0 | 0 | 0 | 0 |
| 344 | R Campbell | 1939–1943 | 34 | 2 | 0 | 0 | 6 |
| 345 | Ken Kelly | 1939 | 2 | 0 | 0 | 0 | 0 |
| 346 | H Allen | 1939–1940 | 14 | 5 | 0 | 0 | 15 |
| 347 | J Tisdale | 1939–1940 | 12 | 2 | 0 | 0 | 6 |
| 348 | John Caffrey | 1939 | 2 | 0 | 0 | 0 | 0 |
| 349 | Harry Martin | 1939–1943 | 13 | 4 | 0 | 0 | 12 |
| 350 | Bruce Brown | 1940–1944 | 68 | 31 | 0 | 0 | 93 |
| 351 | A Patrick | 1940 | 10 | 0 | 0 | 0 | 0 |
| 352 | Jack Whitehurst | 1940–1943 | 40 | 8 | 0 | 0 | 24 |
| 353 | Doug Rogers | 1940–1941 | 14 | 2 | 17 | 0 | 40 |
| 354 | Jack Farrell | 1940 | 1 | 0 | 0 | 0 | 0 |
| 355 | J Grahame | 1940–1942 | 15 | 1 | 0 | 0 | 3 |
| 356 | R Ridley | 1940–1943 | 4 | 0 | 0 | 0 | 0 |
| 357 | J Huxley | 1941 | 8 | 0 | 0 | 0 | 0 |
| 358 | N Parkinson | 1941–1942 | 17 | 8 | 22 | 0 | 68 |
| 359 | Jim Rutherford | 1941 | 4 | 4 | 0 | 0 | 12 |
| 360 | T Slattery | 1941 | 8 | 0 | 0 | 0 | 0 |
| 361 | Bob Thompson | 1941–1942 | 2 | 0 | 0 | 0 | 0 |
| 362 | Eric Bennett | 1941–1949 | 101 | 38 | 1 | 0 | 116 |
| 363 | C O'Brien | 1941 | 3 | 0 | 0 | 0 | 0 |
| 364 | C Sherry | 1941 | 2 | 0 | 0 | 0 | 0 |
| 365 | Harry Grew | 1942 | 11 | 0 | 0 | 0 | 0 |
| 366 | L Hoschke | 1942 | 11 | 4 | 0 | 0 | 12 |
| 367 | Neville Spence | 1942–1947 | 52 | 4 | 0 | 0 | 12 |
| 368 | W Taylor | 1942–1945 | 36 | 2 | 0 | 0 | 6 |
| 369 | C Williams | 1942–1944 | 3 | 0 | 0 | 0 | 0 |
| 370 | R Hill | 1942–1944 | 6 | 0 | 0 | 0 | 0 |
| 371 | William Brown | 1942–1949 | 38 | 1 | 0 | 0 | 3 |
| 372 | Terry Edwards | 1942–1949 | 22 | 4 | 0 | 0 | 12 |
| 373 | R McLaurin | 1942 | 3 | 1 | 0 | 0 | 3 |
| 374 | J Wilson | 1942 | 2 | 0 | 2 | 0 | 4 |
| 375 | A Rice | 1942 | 2 | 0 | 0 | 0 | 0 |
| 376 | R Thompson | 1942 | 1 | 0 | 0 | 0 | 0 |
| 377 | J Fawkner | 1942–1946 | 4 | 3 | 0 | 0 | 9 |
| 378 | Billy Morris | 1942 | 6 | 1 | 0 | 0 | 3 |
| 379 | J Hope | 1942 | 5 | 0 | 0 | 0 | 0 |
| 380 | E Edwards | 1942 | 4 | 0 | 0 | 0 | 0 |
| 381 | T Grew | 1942 | 4 | 0 | 0 | 0 | 0 |
| 382 | Les Rigby | 1942 | 3 | 0 | 1 | 0 | 2 |
| 383 | J Beckett | 1942 | 1 | 1 | 0 | 0 | 3 |
| 384 | J Begley | 1943 | 4 | 0 | 0 | 0 | 0 |
| 385 | Arthur Clues | 1943–1946 | 50 | 17 | 2 | 0 | 55 |
| 386 | S Eisenhuth | 1943 | 12 | 2 | 0 | 0 | 6 |
| 387 | Dick Johnson | 1943–1947 | 16 | 0 | 8 | 0 | 16 |
| 388 | Bob Andrews | 1943–1946 | 42 | 13 | 52 | 0 | 143 |
| 389 | B Dawson | 1943–1944 | 9 | 2 | 0 | 0 | 6 |
| 390 | Alan Keato | 1943 | 5 | 0 | 0 | 0 | 0 |
| 391 | R Fields | 1943 | 9 | 3 | 0 | 0 | 9 |
| 392 | Jack Snare | 1943–1947 | 27 | 17 | 0 | 0 | 51 |
| 393 | K Ibbett | 1943–1945 | 7 | 1 | 11 | 0 | 25 |
| 394 | Fred Fayers | 1943 | 10 | 1 | 0 | 0 | 3 |
| 395 | P McFarlane | 1943 | 2 | 0 | 0 | 0 | 0 |
| 396 | Jack Russell | 1943–1946 | 27 | 10 | 6 | 0 | 42 |
| 397 | Ron Martin | 1943–1944 | 18 | 0 | 14 | 0 | 28 |
| 398 | S Ball | 1944 | 2 | 0 | 0 | 0 | 0 |
| 399 | H Fyvie | 1944 | 1 | 0 | 0 | 0 | 0 |
| 400 | Jim Keefe | 1944 | 1 | 0 | 0 | 0 | 0 |
| 401 | Don Milton | 1944–1950 | 77 | 23 | 0 | 0 | 69 |
| 402 | Cliff Peime | 1944–1947 | 58 | 14 | 0 | 0 | 42 |
| 403 | W Phillips | 1944 | 1 | 1 | 0 | 0 | 3 |
| 404 | Alf Cardy | 1944–1945 | 15 | 9 | 0 | 0 | 27 |
| 405 | Neville Hogan | 1944–1948 | 53 | 7 | 0 | 0 | 21 |
| 406 | Fred Yanz Jr. | 1944–1948 | 44 | 28 | 0 | 0 | 84 |
| 407 | J Banner | 1944 | 5 | 2 | 0 | 0 | 6 |
| 408 | Mick Seamer | 1944 | 8 | 0 | 18 | 0 | 36 |
| 409 | Paddy Bugden | 1944 | 7 | 0 | 0 | 0 | 0 |
| 410 | L Clancy | 1944 | 1 | 0 | 0 | 0 | 0 |
| 411 | R Davidson | 1944 | 3 | 0 | 0 | 0 | 0 |
| 412 | Robert Magill | 1944 | 2 | 0 | 0 | 0 | 0 |
| 413 | Frank Dodson | 1945 | 3 | 0 | 0 | 0 | 0 |
| 414 | Jim Nicholson | 1945 | 1 | 0 | 0 | 0 | 0 |
| 415 | Jim Seery | 1945–1949 | 42 | 6 | 0 | 0 | 18 |
| 416 | Jack Walsh | 1945–1950 | 64 | 9 | 0 | 0 | 27 |
| 417 | Col Maxwell | 1945–1949 | 35 | 5 | 0 | 0 | 15 |
| 418 | R Dreves | 1945 | 3 | 0 | 0 | 0 | 0 |
| 419 | R Williams | 1945 | 2 | 1 | 1 | 0 | 5 |
| 420 | Tom Briggs | 1946–1947 | 10 | 5 | 0 | 0 | 15 |
| 421 | J Hickey | 1946–1947 | 11 | 3 | 0 | 0 | 9 |
| 422 | Bob Hobbs | 1946 | 4 | 0 | 1 | 0 | 2 |
| 423 | Lindsay Rodda | 1946–1950 | 33 | 5 | 0 | 0 | 15 |
| 424 | Stan Cruise | 1946 | 1 | 0 | 0 | 0 | 0 |
| 425 | Dick McKelvey | 1946–1949 | 13 | 3 | 0 | 0 | 9 |
| 426 | K Cleary | 1946 | 1 | 0 | 0 | 0 | 0 |
| 427 | Pat Leal | 1946–1953 | 45 | 25 | 0 | 0 | 75 |
| 428 | Trevor Eather | 1947 | 12 | 1 | 0 | 0 | 3 |
| 429 | Kevin Hansen | 1947–1953 | 110 | 19 | 0 | 0 | 57 |
| 430 | Jack Lackey | 1947–1950 | 39 | 10 | 0 | 0 | 30 |
| 431 | Peter McLean | 1947–1953 | 84 | 21 | 0 | 0 | 63 |
| 432 | Mick Thornton | 1947–1948 | 13 | 3 | 10 | 0 | 29 |
| 433 | Bernie Purcell | 1948 | 12 | 2 | 10 | 0 | 26 |
| 434 | Frank Stanmore | 1948–1953 | 87 | 23 | 0 | 0 | 69 |
| 435 | Alan Hornery | 1948–1952 | 58 | 3 | 0 | 0 | 9 |
| 436 | Wally Tebbutt | 1948 | 4 | 0 | 16 | 0 | 32 |
| 437 | Bill Horder | 1948–1953 | 93 | 10 | 0 | 0 | 30 |
| 438 | Keith Holman | 1948–1961 | 200 | 70 | 84 | 0 | 378 |
| 439 | Col Hudson | 1948–1949 | 13 | 5 | 0 | 0 | 15 |
| 440 | Don Worne | 1948–1951 | 16 | 2 | 63 | 0 | 132 |
| 441 | Jack Woods | 1949–1950 | 40 | 10 | 0 | 0 | 30 |
| 442 | George Bain | 1949–1957 | 72 | 12 | 218 | 0 | 472 |
| 443 | Bill Rawlinson | 1949–1951 | 6 | 1 | 0 | 0 | 3 |
| 444 | Jack Fitzgerald | 1949–1955 | 84 | 21 | 0 | 0 | 63 |
| 445 | Gordon Lovell | 1949 | 8 | 0 | 0 | 0 | 0 |
| 446 | Jack Williams | 1949–1950 | 14 | 4 | 0 | 0 | 12 |
| 447 | Vic Williams | 1949–1950 | 10 | 0 | 0 | 0 | 0 |
| 448 | Bill Hilliard | 1949–1950 | 6 | 0 | 0 | 0 | 0 |
| 449 | Jack Wall | 1949–1951 | 28 | 14 | 0 | 0 | 42 |
| 450 | Jack Rawlinson | 1949–1951 | 6 | 1 | 0 | 0 | 3 |
| 451 | Bill Randall | 1950 | 1 | 1 | 0 | 0 | 3 |
| 452 | Dev Dines | 1950–1957 | 58 | 24 | 10 | 0 | 92 |
| 453 | Ron Watson | 1950–1956 | 64 | 8 | 0 | 0 | 24 |
| 454 | Bobby Dimond | 1950–1951 | 23 | 12 | 0 | 0 | 36 |
| 455 | Leo Trevena | 1950–1953 | 29 | 5 | 21 | 0 | 57 |
| 456 | Dudley Beger | 1950–1953 | 10 | 0 | 4 | 0 | 8 |
| 457 | Don Stait | 1950–1952 | 20 | 2 | 1 | 0 | 8 |
| 458 | Arthur Collinson | 1951–1953 | 40 | 20 | 0 | 0 | 60 |
| 459 | Peter Long | 1951 | 15 | 4 | 0 | 0 | 12 |
| 460 | Keith Cullen | 1951–1953 | 23 | 9 | 0 | 0 | 27 |
| 461 | Jack Rudd | 1951–1952 | 6 | 0 | 0 | 0 | 0 |
| 462 | Keith Deacon | 1951–1955 | 9 | 1 | 1 | 0 | 5 |
| 463 | Hec Farrell | 1951–1957 | 58 | 1 | 0 | 0 | 3 |
| 464 | Eddie Hooper | 1951–1957 | 30 | 0 | 0 | 0 | 0 |
| 465 | Keith Muddell | 1951 | 3 | 2 | 0 | 0 | 6 |
| 466 | Bill Callinan | 1952–1953 | 31 | 18 | 0 | 0 | 54 |
| 467 | Gerry Lowe | 1952 | 20 | 2 | 0 | 0 | 6 |
| 468 | Col Ratcliff | 1952–1955 | 37 | 15 | 0 | 0 | 45 |
| 469 | Don Schofield | 1952 | 17 | 9 | 0 | 0 | 27 |
| 470 | Bede Goff | 1952–1960 | 84 | 11 | 0 | 0 | 33 |
| 471 | R Smith | 1952 | 4 | 0 | 0 | 0 | 0 |
| 472 | Fred Mullens | 1952 | 2 | 2 | 0 | 0 | 6 |
| 473 | Jack Dickerson | 1952 | 2 | 1 | 0 | 0 | 3 |
| 474 | W Smith | 1953 | 3 | 1 | 0 | 0 | 3 |
| 475 | Ernie Church | 1953–1954 | 13 | 4 | 0 | 0 | 12 |
| 476 | Mick Carrig | 1953 | 10 | 1 | 0 | 0 | 3 |
| 477 | Jim McKenzie | 1953–1955 | 8 | 2 | 0 | 0 | 6 |
| 478 | Bob Sargent | 1953 | 4 | 2 | 0 | 0 | 6 |
| 479 | Keith Lennard | 1953–1954 | 4 | 1 | 0 | 0 | 3 |
| 480 | Brian Ogle | 1953–1954 | 3 | 0 | 0 | 0 | 0 |
| 481 | Max Caldwell | 1953–1955 | 21 | 1 | 0 | 0 | 3 |
| 482 | Dale Puren | 1953 | 1 | 1 | 0 | 0 | 3 |
| 483 | Barry Owens | 1953–1958 | 34 | 8 | 0 | 0 | 24 |
| 484 | Reg Southam | 1953 | 3 | 0 | 0 | 0 | 0 |
| 485 | Peter Wooden | 1953–1954 | 3 | 0 | 0 | 0 | 0 |
| 486 | Ted Brennan | 1953 | 1 | 0 | 0 | 0 | 0 |
| 487 | Neville Charlton | 1954–1961 | 143 | 27 | 2 | 0 | 85 |
| 488 | Don Graham | 1954–1955 | 19 | 6 | 0 | 0 | 18 |
| 489 | Bill Owens | 1954–1957 | 46 | 2 | 0 | 0 | 6 |
| 490 | Doug Smith | 1954 | 9 | 0 | 0 | 0 | 0 |
| 491 | Johnny Thompson | 1954–1958 | 49 | 24 | 0 | 0 | 72 |
| 492 | W Lowe | 1954 | 3 | 1 | 0 | 0 | 3 |
| 493 | Kevin Owens | 1954 | 3 | 0 | 0 | 0 | 0 |
| 494 | E Burnett | 1954 | 1 | 0 | 0 | 0 | 0 |
| 495 | Jim Fleming | 1954–1957 | 19 | 2 | 0 | 0 | 6 |
| 496 | Bob Tucker | 1954–1955 | 6 | 0 | 0 | 0 | 0 |
| 497 | Jack Gibson | 1954 | 3 | 0 | 0 | 0 | 0 |
| 498 | Bill Carson | 1954–1964 | 118 | 24 | 0 | 0 | 72 |
| 499 | John Harrison | 1954–1955 | 23 | 4 | 0 | 0 | 12 |
| 500 | Ted Wynn | 1954 | 2 | 1 | 0 | 0 | 3 |
| 501 | M Godfrey | 1954 | 2 | 1 | 0 | 0 | 3 |
| 502 | J Leslie | 1954 | 3 | 0 | 0 | 0 | 0 |
| 503 | Bill Brown | 1954–1962 | 50 | 11 | 4 | 0 | 41 |
| 504 | Pat Toohey | 1954 | 1 | 0 | 0 | 0 | 0 |
| 505 | Bill Bailey | 1955 | 13 | 3 | 0 | 0 | 9 |
| 506 | John Brest | 1955 | 10 | 1 | 23 | 0 | 49 |
| 507 | Don Collier | 1957–1962 | 77 | 21 | 0 | 0 | 63 |
| 508 | Pat Hyde | 1955 | 4 | 1 | 0 | 0 | 3 |
| 509 | Jack Plater | 1955 | 9 | 0 | 0 | 0 | 0 |
| 510 | Dick Murphy | 1955 | 5 | 0 | 2 | 0 | 4 |
| 511 | P Williamson | 1955 | 2 | 0 | 0 | 0 | 0 |
| 512 | Noel Trevena | 1955–1962 | 11 | 1 | 16 | 0 | 35 |
| 513 | K Thompson | 1955 | 6 | 1 | 0 | 0 | 3 |
| 514 | Monty Porter | 1955 | 4 | 0 | 0 | 0 | 0 |
| 515 | Geoff Jurd | 1955 | 2 | 0 | 0 | 0 | 0 |
| 516 | Darcy Henry | 1956–1959 | 53 | 37 | 0 | 0 | 111 |
| 517 | Ernie Hills | 1956–1957 | 29 | 19 | 0 | 0 | 57 |
| 518 | Ian Johnston | 1956–1957 | 38 | 15 | 0 | 0 | 45 |
| 519 | Don Meehan | 1956 | 10 | 2 | 0 | 0 | 6 |
| 520 | Kel O'Shea | 1956–1963 | 111 | 30 | 0 | 0 | 90 |
| 521 | Mark Patch | 1956–1961 | 69 | 3 | 0 | 0 | 9 |
| 522 | Cliff Smailes | 1956 | 11 | 0 | 0 | 0 | 0 |
| 523 | Harry Wells | 1956–1961 | 86 | 33 | 0 | 0 | 99 |
| 524 | Pat Daley | 1956–1958 | 5 | 1 | 0 | 0 | 3 |
| 525 | Noel Hurley | 1956 | 2 | 0 | 0 | 0 | 0 |
| 526 | Ray Aldrich | 1956 | 5 | 2 | 12 | 0 | 30 |
| 527 | Fred Delaney | 1956 | 5 | 0 | 0 | 0 | 0 |
| 528 | Peter Hargreaves | 1956–1957 | 18 | 7 | 0 | 0 | 21 |
| 529 | Doug Hambilton | 1957 | 8 | 1 | 0 | 0 | 3 |
| 530 | Darcy Russell | 1957–1960 | 79 | 16 | 357 | 1 | 764 |
| 531 | Brian Shannon | 1957–1958 | 12 | 0 | 0 | 0 | 0 |
| 532 | Ron Sudlow | 1957–1959 | 8 | 0 | 0 | 0 | 0 |
| 533 | Les Midson | 1957 | 10 | 1 | 0 | 0 | 3 |
| 534 | Doug Harrison | 1957 | 2 | 0 | 0 | 0 | 0 |
| 535 | Ernie Johnson | 1957 | 5 | 0 | 0 | 0 | 0 |
| 536 | Brian Isaacs | 1957 | 1 | 0 | 0 | 0 | 0 |
| 537 | Jack Bowman | 1958–1959 | 32 | 5 | 0 | 0 | 15 |
| 538 | Peter Dimond | 1958–1967 | 155 | 84 | 5 | 2 | 266 |
| 539 | Rees Duncan | 1958 | 8 | 0 | 0 | 0 | 0 |
| 540 | Doug Jones | 1958–1960 | 28 | 9 | 0 | 0 | 27 |
| 541 | Jack Mantle | 1958 | 4 | 0 | 0 | 0 | 0 |
| 542 | Don Malone | 1958–1965 | 84 | 16 | 0 | 0 | 48 |
| 543 | Bernie Kelly | 1958–1960 | 23 | 4 | 0 | 0 | 12 |
| 544 | Colin Wells | 1958 | 3 | 0 | 0 | 0 | 0 |
| 545 | Fred Graber | 1958 | 4 | 1 | 0 | 0 | 3 |
| 546 | John Dawson | 1958–1961 | 14 | 0 | 0 | 0 | 0 |
| 547 | Ian Moir | 1959–1960 | 28 | 14 | 0 | 0 | 42 |
| 548 | John Taunton | 1959 | 4 | 0 | 0 | 0 | 0 |
| 549 | Ron McDermott | 1959 | 6 | 0 | 0 | 0 | 0 |
| 550 | John Mowbray | 1959–1968 | 84 | 40 | 0 | 0 | 120 |
| 551 | Dick Poole | 1959–1960 | 32 | 8 | 0 | 0 | 24 |
| 552 | Frank Clegg | 1959 | 2 | 1 | 0 | 0 | 3 |
| 553 | John Conna | 1959–1960 | 10 | 2 | 0 | 0 | 6 |
| 554 | George Downie | 1959–1960 | 11 | 0 | 0 | 0 | 0 |
| 555 | Dave Barsley | 1959–1968 | 127 | 41 | 132 | 0 | 387 |
| 556 | Roger Buttenshaw | 1959–1964 | 29 | 6 | 0 | 0 | 18 |
| 557 | Joe Ryan | 1959–1962 | 9 | 4 | 0 | 0 | 12 |
| 558 | Denis Meaney | 1960–1966 | 131 | 12 | 1 | 0 | 38 |
| 559 | Garry Russell | 1960-1964 | 27 | 2 | 0 | 0 | 6 |
| 560 | Arthur Summons | 1960–1964 | 56 | 11 | 0 | 0 | 33 |
| 561 | Ken Bray | 1960–1966 | 38 | 6 | 112 | 0 | 242 |
| 562 | Max Carter | 1960 | 2 | 0 | 0 | 0 | 0 |
| 563 | Kevin Cocks | 1960 | 1 | 0 | 0 | 0 | 0 |
| 564 | Bill Tonkin | 1960 | 9 | 3 | 0 | 0 | 9 |
| 565 | John Hayes | 1961–1968 | 121 | 14 | 0 | 0 | 42 |
| 566 | Billy Martin | 1961 | 16 | 4 | 0 | 0 | 12 |
| 567 | Don Parish | 1961–1967 | 65 | 17 | 179 | 5 | 419 |
| 568 | Kevin Smyth | 1961–1964 | 67 | 17 | 0 | 0 | 51 |
| 569 | John Rochester | 1961–1963 | 5 | 0 | 0 | 0 | 0 |
| 570 | Noel Kelly | 1961–1969 | 111 | 6 | 0 | 0 | 18 |
| 571 | Fred Norden | 1961–1962 | 26 | 8 | 0 | 0 | 24 |
| 572 | Gil MacDougall | 1962–1966 | 82 | 15 | 0 | 0 | 45 |
| 573 | Brian Henderson | 1962–1963 | 11 | 1 | 0 | 0 | 3 |
| 574 | Bob McGuinness | 1962–1968 | 95 | 5 | 1 | 5 | 27 |
| 575 | Don Hall | 1962–1964 | 8 | 0 | 0 | 0 | 0 |
| 576 | Carl Ross | 1962 | 3 | 0 | 0 | 0 | 0 |
| 577 | Jim Cody | 1962–1973 | 128 | 9 | 0 | 0 | 27 |
| 578 | Wal Hinkley | 1962–1963 | 2 | 1 | 0 | 0 | 3 |
| 579 | Bob McLaughlin | 1963–1964 | 3 | 0 | 0 | 0 | 0 |
| 580 | Jack Gibson | 1963–1964 | 19 | 1 | 0 | 0 | 3 |
| 581 | Ken Owens | 1964 | 14 | 1 | 0 | 0 | 3 |
| 582 | Ray Picklum | 1964 | 2 | 0 | 1 | 0 | 2 |
| 583 | Dennis Laverty | 1964 | 2 | 1 | 0 | 0 | 3 |
| 584 | John Armstrong | 1964–1970 | 80 | 13 | 10 | 0 | 59 |
| 585 | Ron Costello | 1964–1965 | 18 | 1 | 0 | 0 | 3 |
| 586 | Doug Page | 1964–1966 | 29 | 2 | 6 | 0 | 18 |
| 587 | Roy Ferguson | 1964–1971 | 101 | 24 | 1 | 0 | 74 |
| 588 | John Kearns | 1964–1968 | 7 | 1 | 0 | 0 | 3 |
| 589 | Brian Kowald | 1964–1966 | 8 | 0 | 0 | 0 | 0 |
| 590 | James Gibson | 1964 | 1 | 0 | 0 | 0 | 0 |
| 591 | Pat Thomas | 1964–1967 | 43 | 4 | 6 | 0 | 24 |
| 592 | Denis Culpan | 1964 | 1 | 0 | 0 | 0 | 0 |
| 593 | Noel Thornton | 1965–1966 | 35 | 2 | 0 | 0 | 6 |
| 594 | Dick Pickett | 1965–1969 | 32 | 4 | 0 | 0 | 12 |
| 595 | Denis Pittard | 1965–1967 | 44 | 14 | 0 | 0 | 42 |
| 596 | Jim Brophy | 1965 | 3 | 1 | 0 | 0 | 3 |
| 597 | Graham Bevan | 1965–1966 | 6 | 1 | 0 | 0 | 3 |
| 598 | Bill Wilson | 1965–1966 | 4 | 0 | 0 | 0 | 6 |
| 599 | Bill Hansen | 1965–1966 | 16 | 0 | 0 | 0 | 0 |
| 600 | Barry Bryant | 1965–1973 | 136 | 25 | 0 | 0 | 75 |
| 601 | Peter Burnicle | 1965 | 1 | 0 | 0 | 0 | 0 |
| 602 | John Elford | 1966–1978 | 116 | 14 | 0 | 0 | 42 |
| 603 | Alan Allison | 1966–1968 | 24 | 1 | 0 | 0 | 3 |
| 604 | Glen Brown | 1966 | 3 | 0 | 0 | 0 | 0 |
| 605 | Ken Stonestreet | 1967–1972 | 124 | 8 | 0 | 1 | 26 |
| 606 | Noel Dolton | 1967–1968 | 14 | 0 | 0 | 0 | 0 |
| 607 | Bob Smith | 1967 | 1 | 0 | 0 | 0 | 0 |
| 608 | Doug Walkaden | 1967–1969 | 49 | 4 | 0 | 1 | 14 |
| 609 | Tony Ford | 1967–1974 | 104 | 11 | 317 | 0 | 667 |
| 610 | Barry Glasgow | 1967–1969 | 32 | 2 | 61 | 1 | 129 |
| 611 | Tony Packham | 1967 | 1 | 0 | 0 | 0 | 0 |
| 612 | Peter Chapman | 1967 | 1 | 0 | 0 | 0 | 0 |
| 613 | Ross Goodman | 1967–1968 | 15 | 0 | 0 | 0 | 0 |
| 614 | Bruce Beer | 1967–1969 | 34 | 4 | 1 | 7 | 28 |
| 615 | John Maxwell | 1968–1971 | 38 | 9 | 0 | 1 | 29 |
| 616 | Rod Smith | 1968–1972 | 63 | 16 | 0 | 0 | 48 |
| 617 | John Walsh | 1968–1970 | 15 | 3 | 0 | 0 | 9 |
| 618 | Mick Alchin | 1968–1971 | 38 | 18 | 0 | 0 | 54 |
| 619 | Neville Hornery | 1968–1969 | 4 | 0 | 0 | 0 | 0 |
| 620 | Tim Murphy | 1968–1971, 1975 | 68 | 6 | 0 | 0 | 18 |
| 621 | Steve Winter | 1968–1972 | 28 | 1 | 0 | 0 | 3 |
| 622 | John Baker | 1968–1973 | 107 | 21 | 0 | 0 | 63 |
| 623 | Peter Flanders | 1969–1971 | 33 | 6 | 68 | 3 | 160 |
| 624 | Gary Gunton | 1969 | 3 | 0 | 0 | 0 | 0 |
| 625 | John Fisher | 1969–1970 | 18 | 3 | 0 | 0 | 9 |
| 626 | Frank Tagg | 1969 | 4 | 1 | 0 | 0 | 3 |
| 627 | Don Rogers | 1969–1972, 1975–1976 | 99 | 44 | 0 | 0 | 132 |
| 628 | Geoff Henry | 1969 | 3 | 0 | 0 | 0 | 0 |
| 629 | Tommy Raudonikis | 1969–1979 | 202 | 30 | 0 | 0 | 90 |
| 630 | Wayne James | 1969 | 1 | 1 | 0 | 0 | 3 |
| 631 | Gary Weston | 1969–1970 | 5 | 0 | 0 | 0 | 0 |
| 632 | Jon Clarke | 1969 | 2 | 1 | 1 | 0 | 5 |
| 633 | Tony Antunac | 1970–1971 | 21 | 2 | 0 | 0 | 6 |
| 634 | Wayne Merry | 1970–1972 | 22 | 5 | 0 | 0 | 15 |
| 635 | Derek Brouwer | 1970–1971 | 23 | 3 | 0 | 0 | 9 |
| 636 | Jeff Nielsen | 1970 | 1 | 0 | 0 | 0 | 0 |
| 637 | Kevin Timbs Jnr. | 1970–1971 | 15 | 5 | 0 | 0 | 15 |
| 638 | Ivan Jones | 1970 | 1 | 0 | 0 | 0 | 0 |
| 639 | Dick Timbs | 1971 | 5 | 3 | 0 | 0 | 9 |
| 640 | Neville Sinclair | 1971–1977 | 43 | 4 | 6 | 0 | 24 |
| 641 | George Skeers | 1971–1972 | 14 | 3 | 0 | 0 | 9 |
| 642 | Russell Mullins | 1971–1977 | 113 | 53 | 0 | 0 | 159 |
| 643 | Noel Hurford | 1971 | 5 | 0 | 4 | 0 | 8 |
| 644 | Russell Johnstone | 1971–1973 | 32 | 4 | 0 | 0 | 12 |
| 645 | Brian Winney | 1971–1972 | 17 | 8 | 0 | 0 | 24 |
| 646 | Barry Boss | 1971 | 2 | 0 | 0 | 0 | 0 |
| 647 | Col Withers | 1971–1973 | 7 | 1 | 0 | 0 | 3 |
| 648 | Jim Croucher | 1971–1973 | 10 | 1 | 0 | 0 | 3 |
| 649 | John Heyward | 1972–1979 | 57 | 11 | 0 | 0 | 33 |
| 650 | Stephen Knight | 1972–1975 | 73 | 25 | 0 | 0 | 75 |
| 651 | John Walker | 1972 | 17 | 1 | 0 | 0 | 3 |
| 652 | John O'Bryan | 1972–1974 | 39 | 6 | 0 | 0 | 18 |
| 653 | Olaf Prattl | 1972 | 8 | 2 | 0 | 0 | 6 |
| 654 | John Sheridan | 1972–1973 | 8 | 1 | 0 | 0 | 3 |
| 655 | Steve Satterley | 1972–1974 | 49 | 14 | 23 | 0 | 88 |
| 656 | Allan Ashmore | 1972–1973 | 15 | 5 | 0 | 0 | 15 |
| 657 | Greg Rose | 1972-1973 | 3 | 0 | 0 | 0 | 0 |
| 658 | Peter Handcock | 1972 | 6 | 0 | 0 | 0 | 0 |
| 659 | John Glachan | 1972 | 3 | 1 | 0 | 0 | 3 |
| 660 | Geoff Foster | 1972–1978 | 105 | 28 | 0 | 1 | 85 |
| 661 | Terry Mullins | 1972–1973 | 12 | 2 | 0 | 0 | 6 |
| 662 | Shane Day | 1973–1978 | 84 | 1 | 0 | 0 | 3 |
| 663 | Brian Isbester | 1973–1974 | 13 | 1 | 0 | 0 | 3 |
| 664 | Jim Murphy | 1973–1976 | 54 | 13 | 0 | 0 | 39 |
| 665 | Robbie Parker | 1973–1976 | 82 | 19 | 0 | 0 | 57 |
| 666 | Ted Walton | 1973 | 1 | 0 | 0 | 0 | 0 |
| 667 | Nick Moroko | 1973 | 12 | 1 | 0 | 0 | 3 |
| 668 | Jim Myers | 1973–1974 | 18 | 1 | 0 | 0 | 3 |
| 669 | Phil Franks | 1973 | 2 | 0 | 0 | 0 | 0 |
| 670 | Dave Oliveri | 1974 | 4 | 1 | 0 | 0 | 3 |
| 671 | John Purcell | 1974–1978 | 60 | 7 | 0 | 0 | 21 |
| 672 | Warren Snodgrass | 1974 | 21 | 1 | 0 | 0 | 3 |
| 673 | Steve Rigney | 1974–1976 | 14 | 3 | 0 | 0 | 9 |
| 674 | Mick Liubinskas | 1974–1978 | 44 | 10 | 0 | 0 | 30 |
| 675 | John Dorahy | 1974–1979 | 102 | 29 | 228 | 2 | 545 |
| 676 | Pat Hundy | 1974–1979 | 40 | 0 | 0 | 0 | 0 |
| 677 | Graeme O'Grady | 1974–1979 | 95 | 21 | 3 | 3 | 72 |
| 678 | Russell Worth | 1974 | 17 | 2 | 0 | 0 | 6 |
| 679 | Ron Giteau | 1974–1980 | 102 | 41 | 153 | 2 | 429 |
| 680 | Geoff Smith | 1974–1977 | 24 | 2 | 0 | 0 | 6 |
| 681 | John Donnelly | 1975–1984 | 148 | 6 | 6 | 4 | 34 |
| 682 | Terry Rose | 1975–1976 | 2 | 0 | 0 | 0 | 0 |
| 683 | Chris Wellman | 1975 | 23 | 5 | 0 | 0 | 15 |
| 684 | Trevor Scarr | 1975–1978 | 30 | 6 | 0 | 0 | 18 |
| 685 | Ken Hey | 1975–1977, 1980 | 32 | 2 | 0 | 0 | 6 |
| 686 | Greg McTeigue | 1975 | 2 | 0 | 0 | 0 | 0 |
| 687 | Peter Young | 1975–1978 | 42 | 2 | 0 | 0 | 6 |
| 688 | Trevor Reardon | 1975–1978 | 14 | 2 | 0 | 0 | 6 |
| 689 | Les Boyd | 1976–1979 | 68 | 23 | 0 | 0 | 69 |
| 690 | Wayne Smith | 1976–1984 | 161 | 48 | 3 | 0 | 154 |
| 691 | Peter Walsh | 1976–1980 | 18 | 3 | 20 | 0 | 49 |
| 692 | Steve Blyth | 1976–1978 | 47 | 5 | 0 | 0 | 15 |
| 693 | Geoff Gardiner | 1976 | 2 | 0 | 0 | 0 | 0 |
| 694 | Doug Lucas | 1977 | 14 | 0 | 0 | 0 | 0 |
| 695 | Gavin Miller | 1977 | 17 | 2 | 1 | 0 | 8 |
| 696 | Don Moseley | 1977–1979 | 49 | 8 | 31 | 0 | 86 |
| 697 | Ken Bourke | 1977 | 5 | 0 | 0 | 0 | 0 |
| 698 | Peter Rowles | 1977–1980 | 46 | 11 | 143 | 3 | 322 |
| 699 | Kerry Morrison | 1977 | 1 | 0 | 0 | 0 | 0 |
| 700 | Bob Cooper | 1977–1982 | 81 | 14 | 0 | 0 | 42 |
| 701 | Alan Neil | 1977–1982 | 67 | 21 | 0 | 1 | 64 |
| 702 | Marshall Rogers | 1977 | 4 | 1 | 0 | 0 | 3 |
| 703 | Garry Walsh | 1977 | 3 | 0 | 0 | 0 | 0 |
| 704 | Steve Eisenhuth | 1977–1978 | 2 | 0 | 0 | 0 | 0 |
| 705 | Peter Lema | 1977 | 1 | 0 | 0 | 0 | 0 |
| 706 | Dave Kennedy | 1977–1978 | 2 | 0 | 0 | 0 | 0 |
| 707 | Eric Cain | 1978–1979 | 36 | 9 | 0 | 0 | 27 |
| 708 | Bruce Gibbs | 1978–1980 | 49 | 4 | 0 | 0 | 12 |
| 709 | John Crow | 1978–1980 | 4 | 0 | 0 | 0 | 0 |
| 710 | Garry Clarke | 1978 | 1 | 1 | 0 | 0 | 3 |
| 711 | Stephen Broughton | 1978–1984 | 77 | 43 | 1 | 0 | 156 |
| 712 | David Waite | 1978 | 7 | 2 | 0 | 0 | 6 |
| 713 | Bill Cloughessy | 1978–1979 | 11 | 0 | 0 | 0 | 0 |
| 714 | Ron Brodrick | 1978–1980 | 19 | 6 | 0 | 0 | 18 |
| 715 | Warren Boland | 1979–1983 | 97 | 28 | 0 | 0 | 90 |
| 716 | Ray Brown | 1979 | 23 | 5 | 0 | 0 | 15 |
| 717 | Jack Jeffries | 1979–1980 | 55 | 6 | 0 | 0 | 18 |
| 718 | Brian Cook | 1979–1980 | 7 | 1 | 0 | 0 | 3 |
| 719 | Mark Beaven | 1979–1983 | 58 | 7 | 0 | 0 | 23 |
| 720 | Gerard Crowe | 1979 | 1 | 0 | 0 | 0 | 0 |
| 721 | Col Ensor | 1979 | 1 | 0 | 0 | 0 | 0 |
| 722 | Pat Hurney | 1979 | 1 | 0 | 0 | 0 | 0 |
| 723 | Terry Leabeater | 1979–1982, 1985 | 63 | 2 | 0 | 0 | 6 |
| 724 | Tony Armstrong | 1979–1980 | 2 | 0 | 0 | 0 | 0 |
| 725 | Peter Barr | 1979–1982 | 4 | 1 | 0 | 0 | 3 |
| 726 | Jeff Case | 1980–1983 | 9 | 1 | 0 | 0 | 3 |
| 727 | Ted Goodwin | 1980–1982 | 24 | 4 | 0 | 1 | 13 |
| 728 | Jim Leis | 1980–1982 | 58 | 16 | 0 | 0 | 48 |
| 729 | Paul Merlo | 1980 | 58 | 4 | 0 | 0 | 12 |
| 730 | Wayne Buckley | 1980 | 12 | 4 | 0 | 0 | 12 |
| 731 | John Ribot | 1980–1981 | 36 | 26 | 11 | 0 | 100 |
| 732 | Terry Lamb | 1980–1983 | 87 | 41 | 11 | 7 | 163 |
| 733 | Alan Latham | 1980–1981 | 8 | 0 | 0 | 0 | 0 |
| 734 | John McLeod | 1980–1981 | 21 | 4 | 0 | 0 | 12 |
| 735 | Tom Arber | 1980–1982 | 46 | 3 | 0 | 0 | 9 |
| 736 | Michael Duke | 1980–1984 | 66 | 5 | 0 | 0 | 17 |
| 737 | Garry Dowling | 1981 | 19 | 5 | 0 | 0 | 15 |
| 738 | Ian Schubert | 1981, 1985–1989 | 90 | 13 | 123 | 1 | 291 |
| 739 | Greg Cox | 1981–1984 | 50 | 3 | 98 | 0 | 205 |
| 740 | Trevor Cogger | 1981–1991 | 161 | 39 | 0 | 0 | 138 |
| 741 | Garry Jack | 1981 | 5 | 1 | 0 | 0 | 3 |
| 742 | Ross Conlon | 1981–1982 | 5 | 1 | 0 | 0 | 3 |
| 743 | George Moroko | 1983–1988 | 25 | 2 | 0 | 0 | 6 |
| 744 | Col Dennis | 1981–1983 | 3 | 0 | 0 | 0 | 0 |
| 745 | Bruce Clark | 1981–1987 | 63 | 3 | 0 | 0 | 12 |
| 746 | Mick Pinkerton | 1981–1985 | 30 | 5 | 0 | 0 | 19 |
| 747 | Geoff Spotswood | 1981–1984 | 10 | 1 | 0 | 0 | 4 |
| 748 | Trevor Ryan | 1981 | 2 | 0 | 0 | 0 | 0 |
| 749 | Arthur Mountier | 1982–1983 | 42 | 3 | 0 | 0 | 10 |
| 750 | Bruce Grimaldi | 1982 | 1 | 1 | 0 | 0 | 3 |
| 751 | George Fahd | 1982–1984 | 24 | 1 | 0 | 0 | 4 |
| 752 | Garry Collinson | 1982 | 8 | 1 | 0 | 0 | 3 |
| 753 | Brett Gale | 1982–1983, 1985–1988 | 56 | 5 | 0 | 0 | 20 |
| 754 | Steve Anderson | 1982 | 12 | 4 | 0 | 0 | 12 |
| 755 | Robert Ryan | 1982 | 1 | 0 | 0 | 0 | 0 |
| 756 | Charlie Khalifeh | 1982–1986 | 5 | 0 | 0 | 0 | 0 |
| 757 | Greg McElhone | 1982–1984 | 9 | 1 | 0 | 0 | 3 |
| 758 | David Greene | 1982–1983 | 25 | 6 | 26 | 0 | 76 |
| 759 | Peter Burgmann | 1983 | 1 | 0 | 0 | 0 | 0 |
| 760 | Ian Freeman | 1983–1989 | 66 | 3 | 0 | 0 | 12 |
| 761 | Scott Gale | 1983 | 16 | 5 | 0 | 0 | 20 |
| 762 | David Hall | 1983 | 8 | 0 | 0 | 0 | 0 |
| 763 | George Ghosn | 1983–1984 | 6 | 1 | 10 | 0 | 24 |
| 764 | Bill Hilliard | 1983 | 10 | 0 | 0 | 0 | 0 |
| 765 | Brian Battese | 1983 | 3 | 0 | 0 | 0 | 0 |
| 766 | Paul Gearin | 1983–1984 | 4 | 0 | 0 | 0 | 0 |
| 767 | John Cogger | 1983–1986 | 16 | 1 | 0 | 0 | 4 |
| 768 | Paul Beaven | 1983 | 4 | 0 | 0 | 0 | 0 |
| 769 | Mark Massone | 1983 | 4 | 0 | 0 | 0 | 0 |
| 770 | Mick Neil | 1983–1986 | 47 | 7 | 0 | 0 | 28 |
| 771 | Matt Carter | 1983–1984 | 4 | 0 | 0 | 0 | 0 |
| 772 | David Harris | 1983 | 13 | 4 | 0 | 0 | 16 |
| 773 | Brett Davidson | 1983–1984 | 12 | 1 | 0 | 0 | 4 |
| 774 | Peter Lamb | 1983 | 1 | 0 | 0 | 0 | 0 |
| 775 | Grant Fyvie | 1983–1987 | 12 | 0 | 0 | 0 | 0 |
| 776 | Allan Woods | 1983 | 1 | 0 | 0 | 0 | 0 |
| 777 | Kevin Bryson | 1983 | 1 | 0 | 0 | 0 | 0 |
| 778 | Bob Muirhead | 1983 | 1 | 0 | 0 | 0 | 0 |
| 779 | Gerald Celarc | 1984–1985 | 32 | 1 | 0 | 0 | 4 |
| 780 | John Coveney | 1984 | 12 | 0 | 0 | 0 | 0 |
| 781 | Pat English | 1984 | 11 | 0 | 0 | 0 | 0 |
| 782 | Allen Geelan | 1984–1989 | 86 | 12 | 0 | 0 | 48 |
| 783 | Mark Harrigan | 1984–1986 | 34 | 3 | 0 | 0 | 12 |
| 784 | Craig Madsen | 1984–1985 | 15 | 1 | 0 | 0 | 4 |
| 785 | John McArthur | 1984–1985 | 45 | 9 | 37 | 1 | 111 |
| 786 | Gary Webster | 1984–1987 | 36 | 2 | 0 | 0 | 8 |
| 787 | Leo Epifania | 1984–1986 | 23 | 3 | 12 | 0 | 36 |
| 788 | Eddie Flahey | 1984 | 11 | 2 | 0 | 0 | 8 |
| 789 | Darryl Turner | 1984 | 2 | 0 | 0 | 0 | 0 |
| 790 | Craig Ellis | 1984–1987 | 30 | 2 | 0 | 0 | 8 |
| 791 | Gerry Byron | 1984–1986 | 4 | 0 | 0 | 0 | 0 |
| 792 | Steve Kerr | 1984 | 3 | 0 | 2 | 0 | 4 |
| 793 | Scott Rigney | 1984 | 6 | 0 | 0 | 0 | 0 |
| 794 | Brett Clark | 1984–1987 | 47 | 14 | 0 | 1 | 57 |
| 795 | George Katsogiannis | 1984 | 3 | 0 | 0 | 0 | 0 |
| 796 | Allan Fallah | 1984–1990 | 113 | 14 | 0 | 0 | 42 |
| 797 | David Stafford | 1984–1985 | 7 | 1 | 0 | 0 | 4 |
| 798 | Greg Duval | 1985–1986 | 17 | 4 | 0 | 0 | 16 |
| 799 | Mark Lawson | 1985 | 4 | 0 | 0 | 0 | 0 |
| 800 | Chris Stephandellis | 1985–1987 | 10 | 1 | 9 | 0 | 22 |
| 801 | Gary Warnecke | 1985 | 13 | 1 | 0 | 1 | 5 |
| 802 | Mark Keehan | 1985 | 5 | 0 | 0 | 0 | 0 |
| 803 | Craig Clarke | 1985–1986 | 24 | 4 | 0 | 0 | 16 |
| 804 | Steve Want | 1985 | 1 | 0 | 0 | 0 | 0 |
| 805 | Wayne Wigham | 1985 | 14 | 6 | 0 | 0 | 24 |
| 806 | Steve Ewer | 1985 | 4 | 1 | 0 | 0 | 4 |
| 807 | Gary Pearce | 1985 | 2 | 0 | 4 | 0 | 8 |
| 808 | Geoff Dillon | 1985–1986 | 17 | 0 | 1 | 0 | 2 |
| 809 | Steve Mullen | 1985 | 2 | 0 | 0 | 0 | 0 |
| 810 | Tom Robbins | 1985 | 1 | 0 | 0 | 0 | 0 |
| 811 | Lee Crooks | 1985–1986 | 29 | 3 | 36 | 1 | 85 |
| 812 | Peter Worth | 1985 | 2 | 1 | 1 | 0 | 6 |
| 813 | Geoff Sutton | 1985–1986 | 3 | 0 | 0 | 0 | 0 |
| 814 | Greg Brown | 1985 | 1 | 0 | 0 | 0 | 0 |
| 815 | Troy McGregor | 1985 | 1 | 0 | 0 | 0 | 0 |
| 816 | Charlie Eltoubji | 1985 | 1 | 0 | 0 | 0 | 0 |
| 817 | Craig Neil | 1985–1986 | 7 | 0 | 0 | 0 | 0 |
| 818 | Greg Falkner | 1985–1986 | 5 | 0 | 0 | 0 | 0 |
| 819 | Gary McFarlane | 1985–1988 | 19 | 0 | 1 | 0 | 2 |
| 820 | Alan Burns | 1986 | 8 | 2 | 0 | 0 | 8 |
| 821 | Paul Sheahan | 1986–1987 | 31 | 5 | 0 | 0 | 20 |
| 822 | Wilfred Williams | 1986 | 22 | 1 | 0 | 0 | 4 |
| 823 | Brett Davis | 1986–1987 | 13 | 1 | 3 | 0 | 10 |
| 824 | Rod Pethybridge | 1986–1987 | 30 | 13 | 0 | 0 | 52 |
| 825 | John Bilbija | 1986–1987 | 38 | 1 | 0 | 0 | 4 |
| 826 | Ian Naden | 1986–1987 | 30 | 8 | 5 | 7 | 49 |
| 827 | Noel Mancuso | 1986 | 2 | 0 | 0 | 0 | 0 |
| 828 | Grahame Jennings | 1986 | 3 | 0 | 0 | 0 | 0 |
| 829 | Doug Rawlings | 1986–1992 | 57 | 7 | 6 | 0 | 40 |
| 830 | Deryck Fox | 1986 | 8 | 0 | 0 | 0 | 0 |
| 831 | John Henderson | 1986 | 4 | 0 | 0 | 0 | 0 |
| 832 | Des Drummond | 1986 | 9 | 2 | 0 | 0 | 8 |
| 833 | John Elias | 1986–1987 | 28 | 6 | 0 | 0 | 24 |
| 834 | Phillip Duke | 1987–1988 | 27 | 7 | 0 | 0 | 28 |
| 835 | Wayne Lambkin | 1987–1988 | 18 | 0 | 2 | 0 | 4 |
| 836 | Steve McCoy | 1987–1989 | 22 | 5 | 0 | 0 | 20 |
| 837 | Leslie White | 1987 | 16 | 1 | 0 | 0 | 4 |
| 838 | John Allanson | 1987–1988 | 29 | 10 | 0 | 0 | 40 |
| 839 | Scott Tronc | 1987–1988 | 34 | 2 | 1 | 0 | 10 |
| 840 | Terry Donnellan | 1987–1988 | 10 | 0 | 0 | 0 | 0 |
| 841 | Mark Meskell | 1987 | 2 | 0 | 0 | 0 | 0 |
| 842 | Denis Kinchela | 1987 | 4 | 0 | 0 | 0 | 0 |
| 843 | Hew Rees | 1987 | 4 | 0 | 1 | 0 | 2 |
| 844 | Jason Williams | 1987 | 7 | 2 | 0 | 0 | 8 |
| 845 | Andrew Stewart | 1987 | 1 | 0 | 0 | 0 | 0 |
| 846 | Cameron Blair | 1988–1991 | 73 | 5 | 0 | 0 | 20 |
| 847 | Chris Blair | 1988–1989 | 17 | 1 | 0 | 0 | 4 |
| 848 | Gary Bukowski | 1988–1991 | 31 | 0 | 0 | 0 | 0 |
| 849 | Dave Gallagher | 1988–1991 | 51 | 4 | 0 | 0 | 16 |
| 850 | Dale Hall | 1988 | 1 | 0 | 0 | 0 | 0 |
| 851 | Graham Mackay | 1988–1990 | 47 | 16 | 19 | 0 | 102 |
| 852 | Danny Peacock | 1988–1990 | 49 | 9 | 0 | 0 | 36 |
| 853 | Wayne Simonds | 1988–1993 | 82 | 21 | 0 | 0 | 84 |
| 854 | Mick Taylor | 1988 | 1 | 0 | 0 | 0 | 0 |
| 855 | Craig Teitzel | 1988–1989 | 13 | 2 | 0 | 0 | 8 |
| 856 | Dave Woods | 1988–1989 | 42 | 3 | 0 | 0 | 12 |
| 857 | Michael Hoy | 1988 | 5 | 0 | 3 | 0 | 6 |
| 858 | Ian Howcroft | 1988–1989 | 18 | 1 | 0 | 0 | 4 |
| 859 | Michael McClintock | 1988 | 1 | 0 | 0 | 0 | 0 |
| 860 | Mark Bevan | 1988 | 6 | 0 | 4 | 0 | 8 |
| 861 | Jason Stafford | 1988–1990 | 38 | 15 | 0 | 0 | 60 |
| 862 | Ernie Garland | 1988 | 4 | 0 | 0 | 0 | 0 |
| 863 | Jason Lidden | 1988–1993 | 108 | 9 | 1 | 0 | 38 |
| 864 | Peter Vale | 1988 | 5 | 0 | 0 | 0 | 0 |
| 865 | Michael McKinnon | 1988–1989 | 10 | 1 | 0 | 0 | 4 |
| 866 | Dave Wellings | 1988 | 1 | 0 | 0 | 0 | 0 |
| 867 | Brian Brown | 1988 | 1 | 0 | 0 | 0 | 0 |
| 868 | Stephen Funnell | 1989 | 4 | 0 | 0 | 0 | 0 |
| 869 | Shane Leigh | 1989 | 2 | 0 | 0 | 0 | 0 |
| 870 | Pat O'Doherty | 1989–1990 | 35 | 1 | 11 | 0 | 26 |
| 871 | Nick Stevanovic | 1989 | 2 | 0 | 0 | 0 | 0 |
| 872 | Shane Flanagan | 1989–1991 | 42 | 2 | 0 | 0 | 8 |
| 873 | Michael Gould | 1989 | 1 | 0 | 0 | 0 | 0 |
| 874 | Brendon Tuuta | 1989–1990 | 34 | 3 | 0 | 0 | 12 |
| 875 | Richard Smith | 1989 | 12 | 2 | 0 | 0 | 8 |
| 876 | Darren Girard | 1989 | 1 | 0 | 0 | 0 | 0 |
| 877 | Brett Docherty | 1989–1991 | 25 | 0 | 18 | 0 | 36 |
| 878 | Stuart Raper | 1989 | 5 | 0 | 0 | 0 | 0 |
| 879 | Kelvin Skerrett | 1989 | 5 | 0 | 0 | 0 | 0 |
| 880 | Ellery Hanley | 1989 | 13 | 4 | 0 | 0 | 16 |
| 881 | Garry Schofield | 1989 | 9 | 5 | 1 | 1 | 23 |
| 882 | Darren Britt | 1989–1993 | 59 | 2 | 0 | 0 | 8 |
| 883 | Stan Presdee | 1989–1992 | 16 | 1 | 0 | 0 | 4 |
| 884 | Tony Cosatto | 1990–1991 | 43 | 11 | 0 | 0 | 44 |
| 885 | Shaun Devine | 1990–1993 | 43 | 5 | 17 | 2 | 56 |
| 886 | Ivan Henjak | 1990–1991 | 33 | 4 | 0 | 0 | 16 |
| 887 | Steve Jackson | 1990–1991 | 38 | 5 | 0 | 0 | 20 |
| 888 | Bob Lindner | 1990–1992 | 39 | 8 | 0 | 0 | 32 |
| 889 | Jason Taylor | 1990–1993 | 86 | 6 | 225 | 12 | 486 |
| 890 | Jamie Ainscough | 1990–1991 | 35 | 14 | 0 | 0 | 56 |
| 891 | Tim Perrin | 1990 | 3 | 0 | 0 | 0 | 0 |
| 892 | Graham Spinks | 1990 | 1 | 0 | 0 | 0 | 0 |
| 893 | Angelo Alavanja | 1990–1991 | 8 | 0 | 0 | 0 | 0 |
| 894 | Russell Wyer | 1990–1993 | 28 | 9 | 0 | 0 | 36 |
| 895 | Chris Warren | 1990–1992 | 5 | 1 | 0 | 0 | 4 |
| 896 | Jason Kelly | 1990–1991 | 3 | 0 | 0 | 0 | 0 |
| 897 | Noel Goldthorpe | 1990–1991 | 6 | 0 | 0 | 0 | 0 |
| 898 | Paul Fuz | 1990 | 1 | 0 | 0 | 0 | 0 |
| 899 | Shaun O'Bryan | 1990–1991 | 3 | 0 | 0 | 0 | 0 |
| 900 | Stephen Burns | 1991–1992 | 16 | 4 | 0 | 0 | 16 |
| 901 | Jim Dymock | 1991–1992 | 31 | 8 | 0 | 0 | 32 |
| 902 | Tony Rampling | 1991–1992 | 15 | 1 | 0 | 0 | 4 |
| 903 | Joe Thomas | 1991–1993 | 53 | 4 | 0 | 0 | 16 |
| 904 | Ron Gibbs | 1991 | 16 | 0 | 0 | 0 | 0 |
| 905 | David Gillespie | 1991–1993 | 46 | 3 | 0 | 0 | 12 |
| 906 | Andrew Farrar | 1991–1992 | 43 | 7 | 0 | 2 | 30 |
| 907 | Graeme Wynn | 1991–1992 | 41 | 2 | 0 | 0 | 8 |
| 908 | Peter Trevitt | 1991 | 1 | 0 | 0 | 0 | 0 |
| 909 | Reece Webb | 1991–1993 | 3 | 0 | 0 | 0 | 0 |
| 910 | Mark Williams | 1991 | 2 | 1 | 0 | 0 | 4 |
| 911 | Bronko Djura | 1991 | 1 | 1 | 0 | 0 | 4 |
| 912 | Robert Burgess | 1991 | 2 | 0 | 0 | 0 | 0 |
| 913 | Paul Langmack | 1991–1998 | 137 | 18 | 0 | 0 | 72 |
| 914 | Mark Bell | 1992–1993 | 34 | 18 | 0 | 0 | 72 |
| 915 | Terry Hill | 1992–1993 | 33 | 7 | 0 | 0 | 28 |
| 916 | Darren Willis | 1992–1998 | 144 | 49 | 0 | 0 | 196 |
| 917 | Anthony Xuereb | 1992 | 2 | 0 | 0 | 0 | 0 |
| 918 | Kyle White | 1992–1995 | 34 | 2 | 0 | 0 | 8 |
| 919 | David Anderson | 1992–1993 | 23 | 4 | 0 | 0 | 16 |
| 920 | Evan Cochrane | 1992 | 2 | 0 | 0 | 0 | 0 |
| 921 | Billy Noke | 1992 | 3 | 0 | 0 | 0 | 0 |
| 922 | Damien McGarry | 1992–1994 | 23 | 4 | 0 | 0 | 16 |
| 923 | Wayne Taekata | 1992 | 4 | 0 | 0 | 0 | 0 |
| 924 | Stephen Kearney | 1992–1994 | 46 | 6 | 0 | 0 | 24 |
| 925 | Malcolm Wheeler | 1992 | 2 | 0 | 0 | 0 | 0 |
| 926 | Jason Alchin | 1992–1995 | 38 | 2 | 0 | 0 | 8 |
| 927 | Scott Hardy | 1992–1994 | 22 | 5 | 0 | 0 | 20 |
| 928 | Justin Dooley | 1993–1996 | 52 | 2 | 0 | 0 | 8 |
| 929 | Steve Georgallis | 1993–1999 | 148 | 20 | 0 | 0 | 80 |
| 930 | Andrew Leeds | 1993–1999 | 114 | 27 | 240 | 5 | 593 |
| 931 | Steve O'Dea | 1993 | 4 | 0 | 0 | 0 | 0 |
| 932 | Matt Ryan | 1993 | 11 | 1 | 0 | 1 | 5 |
| 933 | Charlie Saab | 1993 | 1 | 1 | 0 | 0 | 4 |
| 934 | Josh White | 1993–1995 | 19 | 4 | 0 | 0 | 16 |
| 935 | Andrew Willis | 1993–1997 | 60 | 11 | 20 | 1 | 85 |
| 936 | Justin Moloney | 1993 | 1 | 0 | 0 | 0 | 0 |
| 937 | Brad Hughes | 1993–1996 | 15 | 0 | 0 | 0 | 0 |
| 938 | Darrien Doherty | 1993–1994 | 4 | 1 | 0 | 0 | 4 |
| 939 | Glenn Grief | 1993–1995 | 48 | 5 | 0 | 0 | 20 |
| 940 | Mark Afflick | 1993–1996 | 31 | 0 | 0 | 0 | 0 |
| 941 | Craig Menkins | 1993 | 5 | 0 | 0 | 0 | 0 |
| 942 | Chris Williams | 1993–1995 | 12 | 4 | 0 | 0 | 16 |
| 943 | Brett Cullen | 1993 | 1 | 0 | 0 | 0 | 0 |
| 944 | Jason Benge | 1993–1996 | 12 | 2 | 0 | 0 | 8 |
| 945 | Mark Hill | 1993 | 2 | 0 | 0 | 0 | 0 |
| 946 | Aseri Laing | 1993–1998 | 50 | 11 | 0 | 0 | 44 |
| 947 | Gerome Lane | 1993–1994 | 4 | 0 | 0 | 0 | 0 |
| 948 | Darren Brown | 1994 | 2 | 0 | 0 | 0 | 0 |
| 949 | Dale Fritz | 1994 | 2 | 0 | 0 | 0 | 0 |
| 950 | Ewan McGrady | 1994 | 4 | 1 | 0 | 0 | 4 |
| 951 | Jim Serdaris | 1994–1995 | 37 | 11 | 0 | 1 | 45 |
| 952 | Paul Smith | 1994–1997 | 41 | 22 | 0 | 0 | 44 |
| 953 | Brent Stuart | 1994–1996 | 38 | 2 | 0 | 0 | 8 |
| 954 | Neil Tierney | 1994–1995 | 19 | 2 | 0 | 0 | 8 |
| 955 | Manoa Thompson | 1994 | 7 | 0 | 0 | 0 | 0 |
| 956 | Jason Eade | 1994 | 12 | 1 | 0 | 0 | 4 |
| 957 | Illiesa Toga | 1994 | 1 | 0 | 0 | 0 | 0 |
| 958 | Stuart Coupland | 1994 | 1 | 0 | 0 | 0 | 0 |
| 959 | David Wonson | 1994 | 2 | 0 | 0 | 0 | 0 |
| 960 | Brandon Pearson | 1994–1997 | 60 | 26 | 5 | 0 | 114 |
| 961 | Bill Dunn | 1994–1997 | 67 | 6 | 0 | 0 | 24 |
| 962 | Ciriaco Mescia | 1994–1999 | 90 | 9 | 0 | 0 | 36 |
| 963 | Ken McGuinness | 1994–1999 | 107 | 35 | 1 | 0 | 142 |
| 964 | Peter Shiels | 1994 | 4 | 2 | 0 | 0 | 8 |
| 965 | Darren Burns | 1995–1996 | 12 | 1 | 0 | 0 | 4 |
| 966 | Damian Driscoll | 1995 | 8 | 0 | 0 | 0 | 0 |
| 967 | Mark Horo | 1995 | 22 | 2 | 0 | 0 | 8 |
| 968 | Damian Kennedy | 1995–1998 | 64 | 13 | 1 | 0 | 54 |
| 969 | Grant Trindall | 1995 | 1 | 0 | 0 | 0 | 0 |
| 970 | Paul Bell | 1995–1996 | 28 | 6 | 0 | 0 | 24 |
| 971 | Tony Wall | 1995 | 10 | 4 | 9 | 0 | 34 |
| 972 | Kevin McGuinness | 1995–1999 | 96 | 37 | 0 | 0 | 148 |
| 973 | David Myers | 1995 | 1 | 0 | 0 | 0 | 0 |
| 974 | David Seidenkamp | 1995 | 1 | 0 | 0 | 0 | 0 |
| 975 | Jason Austin | 1996 | 1 | 0 | 0 | 0 | 0 |
| 976 | Craig Coleman | 1996 | 16 | 1 | 0 | 0 | 4 |
| 977 | Jason Duff | 1996 | 2 | 0 | 0 | 0 | 0 |
| 978 | Chad Harris | 1996–1997 | 12 | 0 | 0 | 0 | 0 |
| 979 | Darren Capovilla | 1996–1997 | 25 | 0 | 0 | 0 | 0 |
| 980 | Andrew Hick | 1996 | 10 | 1 | 0 | 0 | 4 |
| 981 | Nathan Hodges | 1996 | 1 | 0 | 0 | 0 | 0 |
| 982 | John Skandalis | 1996–1999 | 64 | 3 | 0 | 0 | 12 |
| 983 | Harvey Howard | 1996–1999 | 19 | 1 | 0 | 0 | 4 |
| 984 | Michael O'Neall | 1996 | 1 | 0 | 0 | 0 | 0 |
| 985 | Willie Newton | 1996–1997 | 5 | 1 | 1 | 0 | 6 |
| 986 | Nathan Lakeman | 1996 | 4 | 0 | 0 | 0 | 0 |
| 987 | Des Hasler | 1997 | 21 | 6 | 0 | 0 | 24 |
| 988 | Shane Millard | 1997 | 20 | 1 | 0 | 0 | 4 |
| 989 | Jimmy Smith | 1997 | 15 | 0 | 0 | 0 | 0 |
| 990 | Shaun Walliss | 1997 | 1 | 0 | 0 | 0 | 0 |
| 991 | Chris Yates | 1997 | 4 | 0 | 0 | 0 | 0 |
| 992 | Adam Doyle | 1997 | 16 | 4 | 0 | 0 | 16 |
| 993 | Adam Donovan | 1997–1999 | 16 | 3 | 0 | 0 | 12 |
| 994 | Shayne McMenemy | 1997–1999 | 17 | 1 | 1 | 0 | 9 |
| 995 | Brett Taylor | 1997 | 2 | 0 | 0 | 0 | 0 |
| 996 | Brett Hodgson | 1997–1999 | 49 | 18 | 37 | 1 | 147 |
| 997 | Savenaca Lomanimako | 1997 | 1 | 0 | 0 | 0 | 0 |
| 998 | Gary Dowse | 1997 | 1 | 0 | 0 | 0 | 0 |
| 999 | Brett Hickman | 1997 | 1 | 1 | 0 | 0 | 4 |
| 1000 | Scott Coxon | 1998–1999 | 39 | 6 | 0 | 0 | 24 |
| 1001 | Darren Rameka | 1998 | 7 | 0 | 0 | 0 | 0 |
| 1002 | Leo Dynevor | 1998–1999 | 27 | 3 | 12 | 1 | 37 |
| 1003 | Adrian Rainey | 1998 | 13 | 2 | 0 | 0 | 8 |
| 1004 | Don Smith | 1998 | 2 | 0 | 0 | 0 | 0 |
| 1005 | Jason Keough | 1998 | 5 | 0 | 0 | 0 | 0 |
| 1006 | Brenton Pomery | 1998–1999 | 6 | 0 | 0 | 0 | 0 |
| 1007 | Leo Clarke | 1998–1999 | 5 | 1 | 0 | 0 | 4 |
| 1008 | Nick Edwards | 1998 | 13 | 0 | 0 | 0 | 0 |
| 1009 | Ben MacDougall | 1998 | 3 | 0 | 0 | 0 | 0 |
| 1010 | Lincoln Raudonikis | 1998–1999 | 24 | 2 | 0 | 0 | 8 |
| 1011 | Dayle Bonner | 1998–1999 | 17 | 0 | 0 | 0 | 0 |
| 1012 | Ron Jones | 1998 | 4 | 1 | 0 | 0 | 4 |
| 1013 | Brett Warton | 1998 | 11 | 2 | 13 | 0 | 34 |
| 1014 | Darren Fritz | 1998–1999 | 15 | 0 | 0 | 0 | 0 |
| 1015 | Jared Mills | 1998–1999 | 22 | 6 | 0 | 0 | 24 |
| 1016 | Ashley Rhodes | 1998 | 1 | 0 | 0 | 0 | 0 |
| 1017 | Darryl Fisher | 1998 | 10 | 3 | 0 | 0 | 12 |
| 1018 | Travis Baker | 1998–1999 | 11 | 7 | 8 | 0 | 44 |
| 1019 | Aaron Cotter | 1998 | 3 | 0 | 0 | 0 | 0 |
| 1020 | Trent Brown | 1998–1999 | 5 | 0 | 0 | 0 | 0 |
| 1021 | Adam Bristow | 1999 | 11 | 1 | 0 | 0 | 4 |
| 1022 | Justin Brooker | 1999 | 22 | 9 | 0 | 0 | 36 |
| 1023 | Paul Jeffries | 1999 | 3 | 0 | 0 | 0 | 0 |
| 1024 | Robbie Payne | 1999 | 2 | 0 | 0 | 0 | 0 |
| 1025 | Shane Perry | 1999 | 8 | 1 | 2 | 0 | 8 |
| 1026 | Tevita Amone | 1999 | 8 | 0 | 0 | 0 | 0 |
| 1027 | Dane Dorahy | 1999 | 14 | 0 | 3 | 0 | 6 |
| 1028 | Luke Goodwin | 1999 | 5 | 0 | 0 | 0 | 0 |
| 1029 | Marshall Scott | 1999 | 1 | 0 | 0 | 0 | 0 |
| 1030 | Michael Brabek | 1999 | 18 | 0 | 0 | 0 | 0 |
| 1031 | Matt Fuller | 1999 | 21 | 1 | 0 | 0 | 4 |
| 1032 | David Buko | 1999 | 8 | 2 | 0 | 0 | 8 |
| 1033 | Barry Davis | 1999 | 15 | 4 | 0 | 0 | 16 |
| 1034 | Matthew Spence | 1999 | 11 | 1 | 0 | 1 | 5 |
| 1035 | Tate Moseley | 1999 | 13 | 1 | 0 | 0 | 4 |
| 1036 | Chris Marland | 1999 | 5 | 1 | 0 | 0 | 4 |
| 1037 | Ray Cashmere | 1999 | 1 | 0 | 0 | 0 | 0 |
