= Matterson =

Matterson is a surname. Notable people with the surname include:

- Donald Matterson (1953/1954 – 1972), American bank robber
- Frank Matterson (1904–1980), Australian rugby player
- Garth John Matterson, for whom Matterson Inlet was named
- Neil Matterson (rower) (d. 1933), Australian professional sculler
- Ryan Matterson (b. 1994), Australian rugby player
- Terry Matterson (born 1967 in Auburn, New South Wales), Australian rugby league football coach and player
