= Michael Duke =

Michael Duke may refer to:

- Mike Duke (born 1949), American businessman
- Michael Hare Duke (1924–2014), Anglican bishop and author
- Michael Duke (rugby league), Australian rugby league player
