= Neil Matterson =

Neil Matterson may refer to:

- Neil Matterson (rower)
- Neil Matterson (rugby league)
