= Charles Rothwell =

Charles Rothwell may refer to:

- Charles Rothwell (footballer) (fl. 1890s), English footballer
- Charles Rothwell (rugby league) (1894–1917), Australian rugby league footballer
- Charles Easton Rothwell (1902–1987), American diplomat

== See also ==
- Charley Palmer Rothwell (born 1992), English actor
