= Anthony Wall =

Anthony or Tony Wall may refer to:

- Anthony Wall (golfer) (born 1975), English golfer
- Anthony Wall (filmmaker) (born 1951), British documentary filmmaker
- Anthony Wall (RAF officer) (1888–1989), British World War I flying ace
- Tony Wall (hurler) (born 1934), Irish hurler and manager
- Tony Wall (rugby league) (born 1971), Australian rugby league footballer
