= Andrew Willis =

Andrew Willis may refer to:

- Andrew Willis (rugby league)
- Andrew Willis (swimmer)
