= Jack Cogger =

Australian rugby player (born 1997)

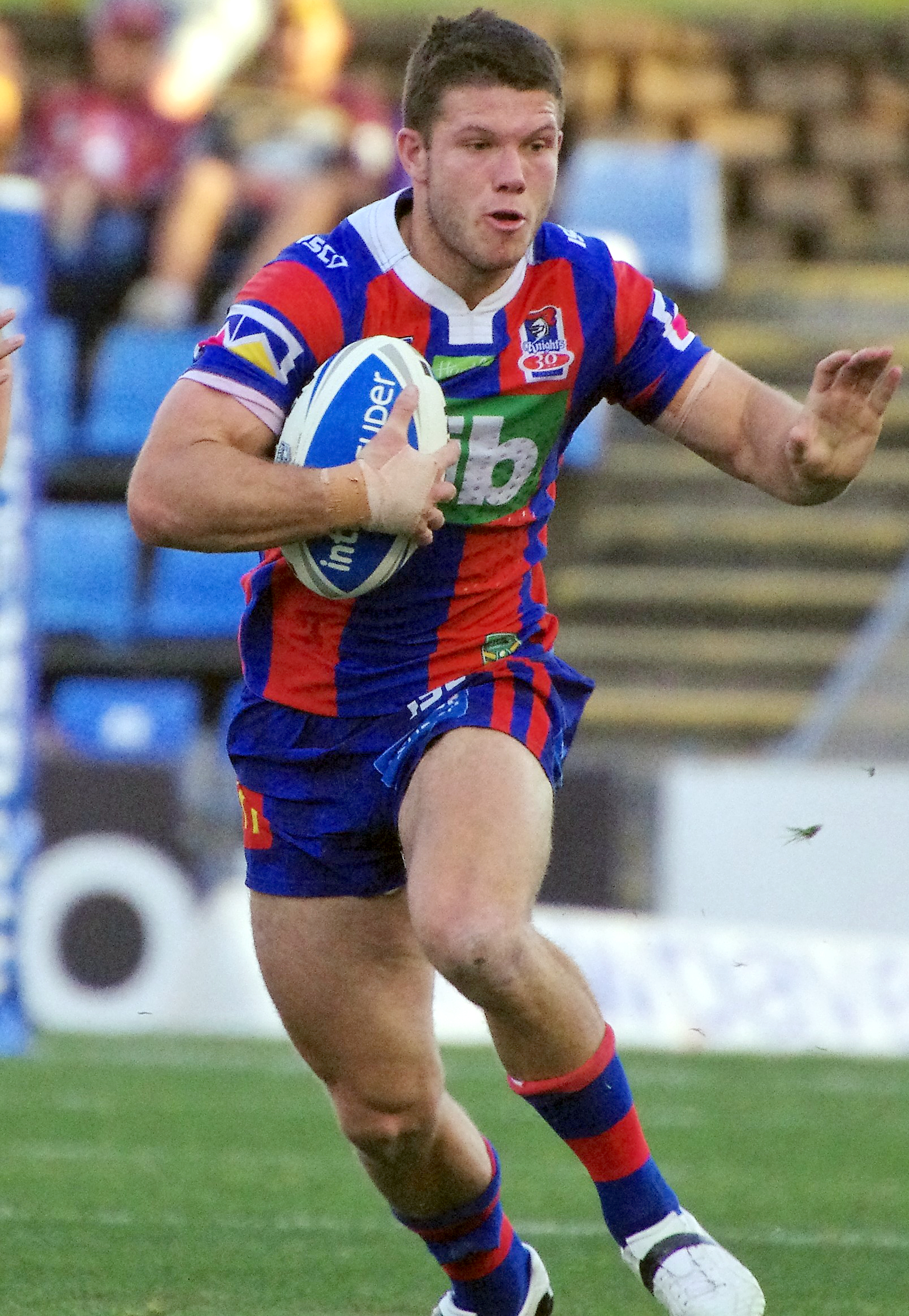

Personal information
- Born: 5 August 1997 (age 29) Greenacre, New South Wales, Australia
- Height: 176 cm (5 ft 9 in)
- Weight: 90 kg (14 st 2 lb)

Playing information
- Position: Halfback, Five-eighth
Club
Years	Team	Pld	T	G	FG	P
2016–18	Newcastle Knights	20	1	0	0	4
2019–20	Canterbury Bulldogs	22	3	0	0	12
2021–22	Huddersfield Giants	27	1	0	1	5
2023	Penrith Panthers	13	0	5	1	11
2024–25	Newcastle Knights	38	3	6	2	26
2026–	Penrith Panthers	17	1	0	0	4
	Total	137	9	11	4	62
- Source: As of 27 September 2026
- Father: Trevor Cogger
- Relatives: John Cogger (uncle)

Jack Cogger (born 5 August 1997) is an Australian professional rugby league footballer who plays as a halfback or five-eighth for the Penrith Panthers in the National Rugby League.

He previously played for the Newcastle Knights, Canterbury-Bankstown Bulldogs, and the Huddersfield Giants in the Super League. He came off the bench in the 2023 NRL Grand Final to win the premiership with the Panthers.

== Background ==
Cogger was born in Greenacre, New South Wales, Australia. He is the son of former Western Suburbs Magpies player Trevor Cogger. He attended Mackillop Catholic College.

Cogger played his junior rugby league for the Toukley Hawks, before being signed by the Newcastle Knights.

== Playing career ==
=== Early years ===
From 2014 to 2016, Cogger played for the Newcastle Knights' NYC team. In November and December 2014, he played for the Australian Schoolboys. On 21 January 2015, he re-signed with the Knights on a contract to the end of 2016. On 27 August 2015, he extended his Knights contract until the end of 2018.

=== 2016 ===
In 2016, Cogger captained the Knights' NYC side. In round 10 of the 2016 NRL season, he made his NRL debut for the Knights against the Cronulla-Sutherland Sharks. In July, he played for the New South Wales under-20s team against the Queensland under-20s team. He went on to play 6 NRL games in his debut season.

=== 2017 ===
After playing just one game for the Knights' Intrust Super Premiership NSW side, Cogger's 2017 season was derailed after having to undergo pelvis surgery. He made his return to the field in round 13 for the club's NYC side, while also playing two NRL matches at the end of the year.

=== 2018 ===
In January, Cogger signed a 2-year contract with the Canterbury-Bankstown Bulldogs starting in 2019, after his pathway to first-grade for the Knights was blocked through the signings of Mitchell Pearce and Connor Watson. Cogger played his final game for the Knights in his side's 12–24 loss to the St. George Illawarra Dragons in round 25.

=== 2019 ===
Cogger made a total of 17 appearances for Canterbury in the 2019 NRL season as the club finished 12th on the table.

=== 2020 ===
On 22 September, Cogger was informed by Canterbury that his services would not be required in 2021 and that he would be released at the end of the 2020 NRL season as the club looked to rebuild after a horror year on and off the field.

In December 2020, Cogger signed a contract to join Huddersfield in the Super League.

=== 2022 ===
On 28 May 2022, Cogger played for Huddersfield in their 2022 Challenge Cup Final loss to Wigan.

In October 2022, it was announced that Cogger had signed a one-year deal with the Penrith Panthers.

=== 2023 ===
On 18 February, Cogger played in Penrith's 13–12 upset loss to St Helens RFC in the 2023 World Club Challenge. In round 14 of the 2023 NRL season, Cogger made his NRL club debut for Penrith in their 26–18 victory over St. George Illawarra. On 2 August, Cogger signed a three-year deal to re-join his former club Newcastle ahead of the 2024 NRL season. Cogger played 13 games for Penrith in the 2023 NRL season including the club's 26–24 victory over Brisbane in the 2023 NRL Grand Final as Penrith won their third straight premiership.

=== 2024 ===
In round 25 of the 2024 NRL season, Cogger scored two tries for Newcastle in their 36–16 victory over South Sydney. Cogger played 17 games for Newcastle in the 2024 NRL season as the club finished 8th and qualified for the finals. They were eliminated in the first week of the finals by North Queensland.

=== 2025 ===
Cogger played a total of 21 games for Newcastle in the 2025 NRL season as the club finished with the Wooden Spoon. Cogger would later depart the Newcastle club and return to Penrith on a three-year deal.

=== 2026 ===
Cogger played 17 games for Penrith in the 2026 NRL season as the club claimed the minor premiership. Cogger played in the clubs shock preliminary final loss to Newcastle.

== Statistics ==
Year	Team	Games	Tries	Goals	FGs	Pts
2016	Newcastle Knights	6				
2017	Newcastle Knights	2				
2018	Newcastle Knights	12	1			4
2019	Canterbury-Bankstown Bulldogs	17	3			12
2020	Canterbury-Bankstown Bulldogs	5				
2021	Huddersfield Giants	18	1			4
2022	Huddersfield Giants	9			1	1
2023	Penrith Panthers	13		5	1	11
2024	Newcastle Knights	17	2			8
2025	Newcastle Knights	21	1	6	2	18
2026	Penrith Panthers					
	Totals	120	8	11	4	58
