= Cameron Bukowski =

Australian professional rugby league footballer

Personal information
- Born: 22 August 2005 (age 21) Brisbane, Queensland, Australia
- Height: 179 cm (5 ft 10 in)
- Weight: 83 kg (13 st 1 lb)

Playing information
- Position: Hooker
Club
Years	Team	Pld	T	G	FG	P
2026–	Brisbane Broncos	1	0	0	0	0
- Source: As of 18 April 2026
- Father: Gary Bukowski

Cameron Bukowski (born 22 August 2005) is an Australian professional rugby league footballer who plays as a hooker for the Brisbane Broncos in the National Rugby League (NRL).

== Background ==
Bukowski was born in Brisbane. His father, Gary Bukowski played BRL for Southern Suburbs in 1987 before adding 31 games with Wests Magpies in the Winfield Cup, and his mum Louise Lanigan is the long-serving company secretary and salary-cap manager at the Broncos. Along with rugby league, Cameron also grew up playing rugby union.

== Playing career ==
=== Juniors ===
Bukowski played his early junior rugby league for the Easts Tigers in the various QRL junior competitions from U6s to the U16s Cyril Connell Challenge, before moving to Wynnum Manly Seagulls for the U18s Mal Meninga Cup.

In 2022, Bukowski played for the Queensland U17s City team.

In 2024, Bukowski represented the Queensland U19s as captain in a 14-10 loss at Leichhardt Oval, Sydney.

In 2025, Bukowski played 23 games in the Queensland Cup for Broncos feeder club Wynnum Manly, scoring seven tries with seven try assists, while amassing 561 tackles at an average of 24 per game.

=== Brisbane Broncos ===
Bukowski made his first-grade debut for the Brisbane Broncos in the 2026 NRL season in Round 7 against the Wests Tigers in a 21–20 win.
