= Trevor Cogger =

Australian rugby league footballer

Personal information
- Born: 30 January 1961 (age 65) Auburn, New South Wales, Australia

Playing information
- Height: 173 cm (5 ft 8 in)
- Weight: 73 kg (11 st 7 lb)
- Position: Halfback, Five-eighth
Club
Years	Team	Pld	T	G	FG	P
1981–91	Western Suburbs	160	48	0	0	190
1985–86	Leigh	27	10	0	0	40
	Total	187	58	0	0	230
- Relatives: John Cogger (brother); Jack Cogger (son)

Trevor Cogger (born 30 January 1961) is an Australian former professional rugby league footballer who played in the 1980s and 1990s. He played for the Western Suburbs Magpies. He played 160 first grade games in the New South Wales Rugby League premiership with the Magpies, the fifth most capped player for the club. Cogger also holds the club record for most appearances in all grades (308) and has scored the most tries for the club in all grades, 88, eclipsing Peter Dimond's previous record.

== Club career ==
Cogger made his first grade debut in 1981. In 1982, he played his third game of the year after being called to the sheds while eating a meat pie and relaxing, having just completed a lower grade game. His call up was successful leading the team to a shock win (scoring two tries). He was heralded as the "Meat Pie Hero" in the Sydney Sun newspaper the following day. He later said, "It was at Lidcombe – I had played third grade at noon and by first-grade kick off I was sitting on the hill with my mates eating a pie. Our halfback, Alan Neil, got hurt early and went off. Then a few minutes later, Terry Lamb was carried off and all of a sudden there was an announcement on the public address system, 'Would Trevor Cogger please report to the Wests dressing room immediately.'"

Although Wests had limited success during the eighties, Cogger scored 48 tries and amassed 190 points throughout his career. He also played and captained the English league club Leigh during the Australian off-season in 1985–86. After one particularly cold match he was hospitalised with hypothermia.

Playing mostly halfback or five-eighth, Cogger was an athletically built player about 173 cm in height. Despite his reasonably light build for a utility back, he seemed impervious to injury, due to his athleticism, until late in his career when he sustained a neck injury. Cogger said, "I had a sore neck after our first two games and went to a specialist. He took X-rays and found that I had fractured my neck a couple of months earlier in England without even realising it."

Cogger played his 200th game for the club in the last game of 1987. Also the last game for coach Steve Ghosn, Cogger played at fullback and scored a try in the victory over Balmain.

Although fearful he would not have a spot under new coach Warren Ryan, Cogger's long first-grade career ended on a high note when he was selected to play centre in the semi-finals in 1991 after injuries to Stan Presdee and Tony Cosatto. It was Wests' first finals appearance since 1982. In 1992, Cogger played in the Wests reserve-grade team that played semi-final football.

Cogger was made a life member of the Western Suburbs club, and later was honoured as five-eighth in the club's Team of the Eighties and was inducted into the Magpies' Hall of Fame. He is also a life member of the Berala Bears club.

== Post-playing career ==
Cogger remains actively involved in the game in both coaching juniors at Toukley, and playing oztag; including representing at a national level for the over-45s, in the same side as former team-mate Allan Fallah.

His son, Jack Cogger, currently plays in the NRL with the Penrith Panthers
