= Willie Newton =

Australian rugby league footballer

Personal information
- Full name: Willie Newton
- Born: 14 June 1978 (age 47)

Playing information
- Position: Halfback
Club
Years	Team	Pld	T	G	FG	P
1996–97	Western Suburbs	5	1	1	0	6
- Source: As of 28 December 2022

Willie Newton is an Australian former professional rugby league footballer who played in the 1990s. He played for Western Suburbs in the ARL competition.

== Playing career ==
Newton made his first grade debut for Western Suburbs in round 20 of the 1996 ARL season against North Sydney at Campbelltown Sports Ground. The match is remembered for a field goal from Andrew Willis who won the game for Wests 23-22. Newton played two further games for the club in the 1996 season. In 1997, Newton made two appearances for Western Suburbs with the last being in round 3 against South Sydney which Wests lost 17-8.
