= Ken Lock =

Australian rugby league player (1911–1974)

Personal information
- Full name: Kenneth Douglas Lock
- Born: 9 November 1911; Tamworth, NSW, Australia
- Died: 24 March 1974 (aged 62); Ermington, NSW, Australia

Playing information
- Position: Hooker, Prop
Club
Years	Team	Pld	T	G	FG	P
1937–41	Western Suburbs	51	5	0	0	15

Kenneth Douglas Lock (9 November 1911 – 24 March 1974) was an Australian rugby league player.

Lock was born in Tamworth and grew up in a large family. After his father died in a hunting accident, Lock and his family moved to Sydney, where he spent his teenage years.

A front rower, Lock played his early rugby league for Fairfield and Southern Districts. He debuted in first–grade for Western Suburbs in 1937 and made regular appearances until 1941.

Lock was a moulder by trade and an elected member of the Executive Council of the Moulders' Union.
