= Jack Peterson (rugby league) =

Australian rugby league footballer

Personal information
- Full name: Jacob Peterson

Playing information
- Position: Hooker, Prop
Club
Years	Team	Pld	T	G	FG	P
1926–30	Western Suburbs	6	0	0	0	0
1931–32	South Sydney	16	0	0	0	0
	Total	22	0	0	0	0
- Source: As of 9 May 2019

Jack Peterson was an Australian rugby league footballer who played in the 1920s and 1930s. He played for Western Suburbs and South Sydney in the New South Wales Rugby League (NSWRL) competition.

== Playing career ==
Peterson made his first grade debut for Western Suburbs against Balmain in Round 7 1926 at Pratten Park. In 1930, Wests finished as minor premiers and reached the NSWRL grand final against St George. Peterson played at prop as Wests were beaten 14-6. The rules at the time allowed Wests to request a rematch as they had finished as minor premiers. A week later, Western Suburbs defeated St George 27-2 in the grand final replay winning their first premiership but Peterson cruelly missed out on selection in the match.

In 1931, Peterson joined South Sydney. In the same year, Souths won the 1931 premiership but Peterson missed out on selection in the match. The following year, Souths reached the 1932 NSWRL grand final against his old side Western Suburbs. Peterson played at second-row as Wests defeated Souths 23-8. Ironically as what had happened 2 years earlier, Souths had finished as minor premiers and used their right to challenge for a rematch. In the grand final replay, Peterson played at hooker as Souths defeated Wests 19-12 at the Sydney Sports Ground. The grand final victory was Peterson's last game for the club.
