= Jack Redmond (rugby league) =

Australian rugby league footballer (1907-1967)

Personal information
- Full name: Thomas Patrick Redmond
- Born: 22 January 1907 Dubbo, New South Wales, Australia
- Died: 8 September 1967 (aged 60)

Playing information
- Position: Wing
Club
Years	Team	Pld	T	G	FG	P
1926–29	Western Suburbs	50	31	0	0	93

Thomas Patrick Redmond, nickname 'Pony', (22 January 1907 - 8 September 1967) was an Australian professional rugby league footballer who played in the 1920s for the Western Suburbs, as a wing. 'Pony' played all of his games on the wing and was the league's top try-scorer in 1928, with a total of 9 tries in 9 games.
