= Adam Doyle =

Australian rugby league footballer

Personal information
- Full name: Adam Doyle
- Born: 6 May 1976 (age 49)

Playing information
- Position: Five-eighth
Club
| Years | Team | Pld | T | G | FG | P |
|---|---|---|---|---|---|---|
| 1997 | Western Suburbs | 16 | 4 | 0 | 0 | 16 |
| 1998 | Warrington Wolves | 14 | 6 | 0 | 0 | 24 |
| | Total | 30 | 10 | 0 | 0 | 40 |
- Source: As of 29 December 2022

Adam Doyle is an Australian former professional rugby league footballer who played in the 1990s. He played for Western Suburbs in the ARL and for Warrington in the Super League.

== Playing career ==
Doyle made his first grade debut for Western Suburbs in round 3 of the 1997 ARL season against South Sydney. Doyle scored a try in Wests 17-8 loss at the Sydney Football Stadium. Doyle played a total of 16 games for the club throughout the year mainly at five-eighth as Western Suburbs narrowly missed the finals. In 1998, Doyle signed for English side Warrington and played a total of 14 games with the club finishing in 10th place.
