= Doug Rawlings =

Australian rugby league footballer

Personal information
- Full name: Douglas Rawlings
- Born: 12 March 1964 (age 61)

Playing information
- Position: Five-eighth, Fullback
Club
Years	Team	Pld	T	G	FG	P
1986–92	Western Suburbs	57	7	6	0	40
- Source: As of 28 December 2022

Doug Rawlings is an Australian former professional rugby league footballer who played in the 1980s and 1990s. He played for Western Suburbs in the NSWRL competition.

== Playing career ==
Rawlings was an Oberon Tigers junior in group 10 who represented Western Division and Country Under 18s. He was awarded player of the series in the National Country Rugby League Championships in 1982. He was graded with Eastern Suburbs in 1984 but injured his knee and remained in Oberon playing out the 1985 season. In 1986, Rawlings signed for Western Suburbs and in 1987 was awarded with Wests rookie of the year. After seven years with Western Suburbs, Rawlings went on to captain-coach Harden Murrumburrah in Group 9 and captained Riverina in the Country Championships.

== Coaching career ==
In 1996 and 1997, Rawlings was an assistant coach at the Perth based Western Reds.
