= Gary Bukowski =

Australian rugby league footballer

Personal information
- Full name: Gary Bukowski
- Born: 7 February 1966 (age 60)

Playing information
- Position: Second-row, Prop
Club
Years	Team	Pld	T	G	FG	P
1988–91	Western Suburbs	31	0	0	0	0
- Source: As of 28 December 2022
- Relatives: Cameron Bukowski (son)

Gary Bukowski is an Australian former professional rugby league footballer who played in the 1980s and 1990s. He played for Western Suburbs in the NSWRL competition. Bukowski also played for Southern Suburbs in the Brisbane Rugby League premiership.

== Playing career ==
Bukowski began his career with Southern Suburbs in the Brisbane Rugby League premiership making two appearances in 1987. In 1988, Bukowski signed for Western Suburbs and made 31 appearances for the club over four years.
