= Dayle Bonner =

Australian rugby league footballer

Personal information
- Full name: Dayle Bonner

Playing information
- Position: Prop
Club
Years	Team	Pld	T	G	FG	P
1998–99	Western Suburbs	17	0	0	0	0
- Source: As of 16 December 2022

Dayle Bonner is an Australian former professional rugby league footballer who played in the 1990s. He played for Western Suburbs in the NRL competition.

== Playing career ==
Bonner made his debut for Western Suburbs in round 7 of the 1998 NRL season against St. George at Campbelltown Sports Ground. Bonner played off the bench in a 12–8 defeat. Bonner only played two matches for Western Suburbs during the year as they finished last on the table and claimed the Wooden Spoon. In the 1999 NRL season, Bonner played a total of 15 games including Western Suburbs final game as a stand-alone club which came against the Auckland Warriors in round 26 of the competition. Bonner played from the interchange bench as Western Suburbs lost 60–16. Western Suburbs would also finish the 1999 season with another wooden spoon. Western Suburbs would then merge with Balmain to form the Wests Tigers, however Bonner was not offered a contract to play for the new team ahead of the 2000 NRL season.
