= Allan Fallah =

Australian rugby league footballer

Alan Fallah
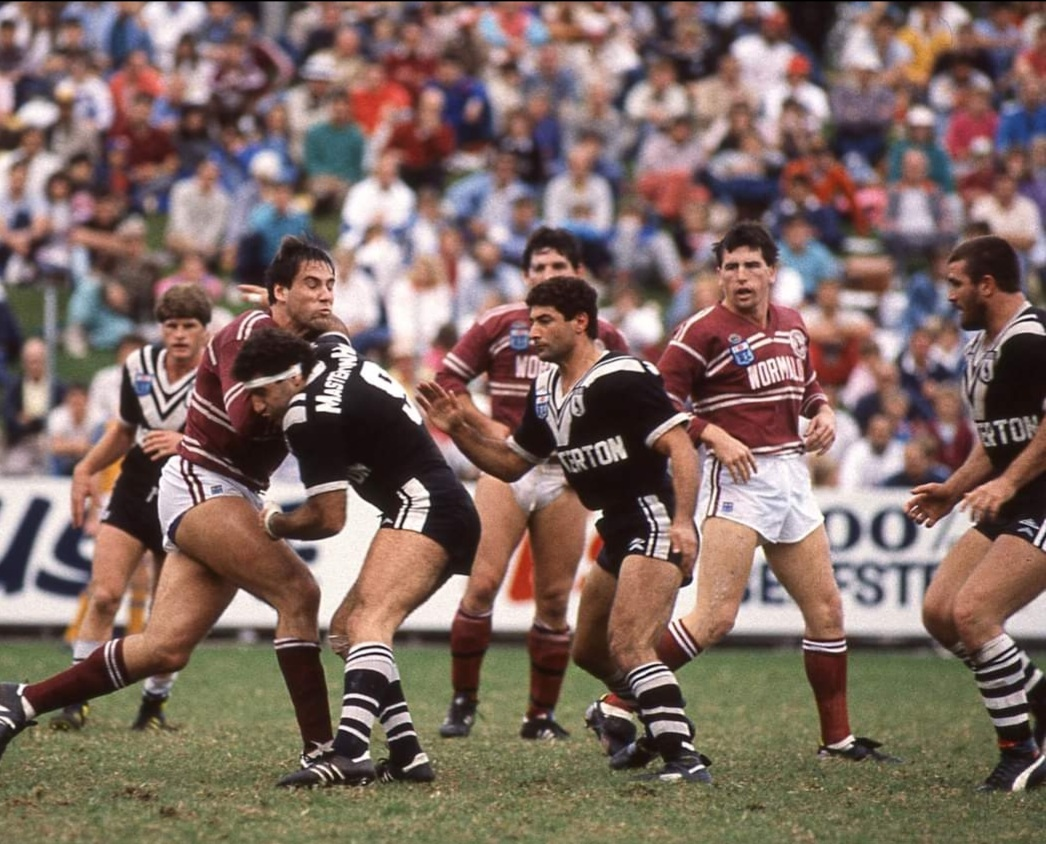

Personal information
- Full name: Alan Shehady Fallah
- Born: 11 March 1959 (age 67) Bankstown, New South Wales, Australia

Playing information
- Position: Hooker
Club
Years	Team	Pld	T	G	FG	P
1984–90	Western Suburbs	113	14	0	0	56
1992–93	Blackpool Gladiators	12	2	0	0	0
	Total	125	16	0	0	56
Representative
Years	Team	Pld	T	G	FG	P
1981	Country Firsts	1	0	0	0	0

Alan Fallah (born 11 March 1959) is an Australian former professional rugby league footballer who played in the 1980s and 1990s for the Western Suburbs Magpies and was also an NRL touch judge.

== Background ==
Fallah was born in Bankstown, New South Wales, Australia.

== Club career ==
A Canterbury junior who played for St George Dragons, Bass Hill RSL, then Chester Hill Hornets from the age of 11, Fallah played grade with the Canterbury Bankstown Bulldogs while still in high school. He studied at the University of Wollongong and played three seasons with the Corrimal Cougars and represented the Illawarra divisional team and NSW Country. He then captain-coached the Oberon Tigers for two seasons, also representing Group 10, Western Division and again NSW Country. Fallah came to attention representing Illawarra in the country rugby league championship 1981. He went on to represent Country Firsts later that year.

Fallah joined the Western Suburbs Magpies in 1984, but badly injured his knee in his second game in reserves. He made his first grade debut towards the end of the season, playing in 6 games, but broke his arm in the second last match. From 1985 to 1990, he was the regular starting hooker for the club. He scored his first try in round 2 of 1985 against Manly, and scored a double in round 23 against Souths. He was first grade captain in 12 games and scored 14 tries for Wests.

The mid-to-late eighties were an unsuccessful period for the Magpies, but Fallah often gained attention for his performances. He was described as, "one of the best number 12s in the game." Coach Ken Gentle said of him, "You can have your Benny Elias. I wouldn't swap Allan for any other hooker in Sydney." Fallah was later named as the hooker in the Magpies' Team of the Eighties.

Fallah retired in 1993 after playing for the Blackpool Gladiators in the UK.

== Refereeing ==
After his retirement as a player, Fallah became a NRL referee/touch judge. He officiated in 87 NRL games, 3 State of Origins and two internationals. He was involved in two incidents that gained press attention. In the first, where Fallah was a touch judge, coach Chris Anderson described referee Rod Lawrence's performance as, "fucking disgraceful," when he encountered the officials at half-time of a match. In the second, there was confusion over whether a conversion should have been awarded when one touch judge raised a flag and another did not.

== Retirement ==
Fallah remained involved in rugby league after his retirement. He is on the board of Wests Football Club. He also coached at the Gymea Technology High School where he taught, as well as Endeavour Sports High School and Sylvania High School. He represented NSW and Australia in Oztag at Masters level, alongside former teammate Trevor Cogger.

== Current ==
Allan Fallah currently teaches physical education at Endeavour Sports High School and Sylvania High School in Sydney, New South Wales. He is a committee member of Wests old boys and on the Wests Football club board of directors.
