= Jason Stafford =

Australian rugby league footballer

Personal information
- Born: 5 July 1967 (age 59) Queensland, Australia

Playing information
- Position: Centre
Club
Years	Team	Pld	T	G	FG	P
1987	Past Brothers		2	0	0	8
1988–90	Western Suburbs	38	15	0	0	60
	Total	38	17	0	0	68

Jason Stafford (born 5 July 1967) is an Australian former professional rugby league footballer who played in the 1980s and 1990s. He played for the Western Suburbs Magpies and Past Brothers.

== Club career ==
Stafford made his first-grade debut with Past Brothers in the Brisbane Rugby League premiership in 1987 as a 19-year-old. He scored 2 tries over the course of the season, playing in the centres, but was not a member of the team that won the grand final that year.

In 1988, Stafford joined the Western Suburbs Magpies in the NSWRL. He made his debut from the bench on 27 March against the Balmain Tigers. A week later, he made his debut in the centres against the North Sydney Bears, also scoring a try. He scored a double in round 7 and again in round 8, where he received attention when he scored an 80 metre try with one shoe missing. Stafford finished the season with 9 tries from his 15 games, making him the club's highest tryscorer - the next closest with 4. Failing to score in his 4 games on the wing, he had 9 from 11 in the centres.

For the 1989 season, Stafford was described as one of the "nobodies" who provided "great hope for the future" for Wests. In the starting team from round 1 this year, he played in 19 games but only scored 2 tries. He was still said to have "revelled" alongside the club's English imports Ellery Hanley and Garry Schofield.

The 1990 season started with Stafford being awarded Man of the Match in the first round of the pre-season Challenge Cup After missing the start of the regular season, the "big stylish centre" returned with another double in "spectacular fashion" in round 4. Scoring 4 tries in his first 3 matches of the season, club coach John Bailey was saying that Stafford had a chance of forcing his way into the Queensland State of Origin team for that year. He soon after suffered a cruciate ligament injury and never played in the competition again, despite being taken by St. George Dragons in the 1991 draft.
