= John Cogger =

Australian rugby league footballer

Personal information
- Born: 26 April 1963 (age 62); Sydney, New South Wales, Australia

Playing information
- Position: Lock
Club
Years	Team	Pld	T	G	FG	P
1983–86	Western Suburbs	21	1	0	0	4
1986–89	Runcorn Highfield	62	34	0	0	136
1989–91	Oldham	62	31	0	0	124
	Total	145	66	0	0	264
- Relatives: Trevor Cogger (brother); Jack Cogger (nephew)

John Cogger (born 26 April 1963) is an Australian former professional rugby league footballer who played as a lock. He played at club level for Western Suburbs, Runcorn Highfield and Oldham.

== Playing career ==
=== Australia ===
Cogger made his first grade debut for Western Suburbs in 1983. He suffered a broken jaw in a match against Balmain early in 1985, which ruled him out for the rest of the year.

=== England ===
Cogger moved to England in 1986, joining Second Division club Runcorn Highfield. He was named Division Two Player of the Year in 1987. He played in the club's heavy defeat to Wigan in the first round of the 1988–89 John Player Special Trophy, with most of Runcorn's professional players having gone on strike. In 1989, he briefly served as caretaker coach at the club following the departure of Bill Ashurst.

Cogger joined Oldham in February 1989, and was appointed as the club's captain. During the 1989–90 season, he helped the club reach the 1989–90 Lancashire Cup final and 1989–90 Challenge Cup semi-final, narrowly losing to Warrington on both occasions.

== Personal life ==
John Cogger is the brother of Trevor Cogger, who also played rugby league for Western Suburbs. His nephew, Jack Cogger, has played for several clubs in the National Rugby League and Super League.
