= Michael Brabek =

Australian rugby league player

Personal information
- Full name: Michael Brabek
- Born: 18 February 1979 (age 46); Sydney, New South Wales, Australia

Playing information
- Position: Lock, Second-row
Club
Years	Team	Pld	T	G	FG	P
1999	Western Suburbs	18	0	0	0	0

Michael Brabek (/ˈbreɪbɛk/) (born 18 February 1979) is an Australian former professional rugby league footballer who played in the 1990s. He played for the Western Suburbs Magpies. He played mostly at second-row, but also played the occasional game at lock.

== Playing career ==
Brabek was graded by the now defunct Western Suburbs Magpies in 1998. He made his first grade debut at second-row in his side's 38−14 loss to the Canberra Raiders at Bruce Stadium in round 4 of the 1999 season. The Magpies finished the season with the wooden spoon and folded at the end of the season.

Brabek played for the Magpies' in their final ever first grade game which was a 60−16 loss to the Auckland Warriors at Campbelltown Stadium. Wests controversially merged with rivals the Balmain Tigers to form the Wests Tigers as part of the NRL's rationalization strategy. Brabek was not offered a contract to play with the newly formed team for the 2000 NRL season and subsequently never played first grade rugby league again. He played in the local Canberra competition for several seasons after leaving the NRL.
