= Jack Snare =

Australian rugby league footballer

Personal information
- Full name: Jack Snare

Playing information
- Position: Wing
Club
Years	Team	Pld	T	G	FG	P
1943–1947	Western Suburbs	27	17	0	0	51
- Source: As of 30 April 2020

Jack Snare was an Australian rugby league player for the Western Suburbs Magpies.

== Career ==
Snare played 27 games and made 17 tries for the Magpies from the 1943 to 1947 seasons. In the 1945 season, he scored 12 tries, leading the total for the Magpies and placing second in the overall tally for the season. Snare retired prior to the 1948 season, though he expressed a desire to remain involved with the club. He later joined the Magpies' "Laws of the Games Committee", where he remained as of 1957.
