= Ray Gormley =

Australian rugby league footballer

Personal information
- Full name: Raymond John Gormley
- Born: 7 June 1887; Parramatta, New South Wales, Australia
- Died: 3 June 1944 (aged 56); Sydney, New South Wales, Australia

Playing information
- Position: Halfback, Centre, Wing
Club
Years	Team	Pld	T	G	FG	P
1908–11	Western Suburbs	19	3	0	0	9
- Source: As of 25 June 2019

Ray Gormley was an Australian rugby league footballer who played in the 1900s and 1910s. He played for Western Suburbs in the New South Wales Rugby League (NSWRL) competition. Gormley was a foundation player for Western Suburbs.

== Playing career ==
Gormley made his first grade debut for Western Suburbs against Balmain in Round 1 1908 at Birchgrove Oval which was also the opening week of the New South Wales Rugby League (NSWRL) competition in Australia. Gormley partnered his brother Lucien in the halves. Balmain would go on to win the match 24-0.

The following week, Gormley scored Western Suburbs first ever try in a 42-7 loss against South Sydney at the Royal Agricultural Society Grounds.

Gormley played in Western Suburbs first ever victory against Newtown in Round 9 1908 at Wentworth Park which ended with a score of 6-5. Gormley scored one of Western Suburbs two tries in the game. The win would be Western Suburbs only victory of the season and the club finished second last on the table above last placed Cumberland who were dissolved at the conclusion of the season.

Western Suburbs would go on to finish last in 1909 and 1910. Gormley's final game for Wests was against North Sydney in Round 7 1910 at St Luke's Park which is where Concord Oval now stands.

== War service ==
Gormley fought in the Australian Army during the first world war. He enlisted in 1915 and served in the 20th Battalion, B Company.
