= Percy Franks =

Australian rugby league footballer

Personal information
- Full name: Percy Thomas Franks
- Born: 13 December 1885 Sydney, New South Wales, Australia
- Died: 19 September 1952 (aged 66)

Playing information
- Position: Wing
Club
Years	Team	Pld	T	G	FG	P
1908–11	Western Suburbs	16	0	0	0	0
- Source: As of 26 June 2019

Percy Franks was an Australian rugby league footballer who played in the 1900s and 1910s. He played for Western Suburbs in the New South Wales Rugby League (NSWRL) competition. Franks was a foundation player for Western Suburbs.

== Playing career ==
Franks made his first grade debut for Western Suburbs on the wing against Balmain in Round 1 1908 at Birchgrove Oval which was also the opening week of the New South Wales Rugby League (NSWRL) competition in Australia. Balmain would go on to win the match 24-0 in front of 3000 spectators.

Franks played in Western Suburbs first ever victory against Newtown in Round 9 1908 at Wentworth Park which ended with a score of 6-5. The win would be Western Suburbs only victory of the season and the club finished second last on the table above last placed Cumberland who were dissolved at the conclusion of the season.

Western Suburbs would go on to finish last in 1909 and 1910. Wests nearly finished last in 1911 but finished just above Balmain on the ladder. Franks final game for Western Suburbs came in Round 12 1911 against Newtown at Erskineville Oval, Sydney which ended in a 14-8 victory.
