= Scott Hardy (rugby league) =

Australian rugby league footballer

Personal information
- Full name: Scott Hardy
- Born: 16 November 1970 (age 54)

Playing information
- Position: Second-row
Club
Years	Team	Pld	T	G	FG	P
1992–94	Western Suburbs	22	5	0	0	20
- Source: As of 21 December 2022

Scott Hardy is an Australian former professional rugby league footballer who played in the 1990s. He played for Western Suburbs in the NSWRL competition.

== Playing career ==
Hardy made his first grade debut for Western Suburbs in round 20 of the 1992 NSWRL season against Canterbury-Bankstown. Hardy scored a try as Western Suburbs won the game 28-16 at Campbelltown Sports Stadium. Hardy played three seasons for Western Suburbs in the NSWRL with his last game also coming against Canterbury which ended in a 40-12 loss. In 2021, a news article reported that Hardy was still playing active rugby league at the age of 50 in the local A-Grade competition.
