= Mick Neil =

Australian rugby league footballer

Personal information
- Full name: Michael Neil
- Born: 29 April 1964 (age 61); Sydney, New South Wales, Australia

Playing information
- Position: Five-eighth, Halfback
Club
Years	Team	Pld	T	G	FG	P
1983–86	Western Suburbs	47	7	0	0	28
1987–91	Balmain Tigers	85	17	0	0	68
1992–93	Illawarra Steelers	23	2	0	0	8
1994	Balmain Tigers	12	0	0	0	0
	Total	167	26	0	0	104
- Relatives: Alan Neil (brother)

Mick Neil (born 29 April 1964) is an Australian former professional rugby league footballer who played as a halfback or five-eighth for Western Suburbs, Balmain and Illawarra in the 1980s and 1990s.

== Career ==
Neil made his first grade debut in the 1983 season for Western Suburbs. In 1987, Neil joined Balmain and played in consecutive losing grand finals for the club in 1988 and 1989. In the 1989 grand final, Neil was ankle tapped by Canberra player Mal Meninga when he looked certain to score what would have been the match winning try for Balmain. Balmain went on to lose the match in what has been described by many as one of the greatest rugby league grand finals of all time. In 1992, Neil joined Illawarra and was part of the side which made it all the way to the preliminary final but lost 4–0 to St George. In 1994, Neil rejoined Balmain and was part of the side which collected the wooden spoon that year. At the end of 1994, Neil retired from rugby league.
