= Neil Matterson (rugby league) =

Australian rugby league player (1899-1971)

Personal information
- Full name: Neile Joseph Matterson
- Born: 27 January 1899 Granville, New South Wales, Australia
- Died: 21 December 1971 (aged 72)

Playing information
- Position: Wing, Centre, Second-row
Club
Years	Team	Pld	T	G	FG	P
1922–29	Western Suburbs	68	22	0	0	66
Representative
Years	Team	Pld	T	G	FG	P
1922–25	Metropolis	4	3	0	0	9
- Relatives: Frank Matterson (brother)

Neil Matterson was an Australian rugby league footballer who played in the 1920s.

== Playing career ==
Matterson played eight seasons with Western Suburbs of the New South Wales Rugby League Premiership. He has 68 caps with the Magpies and 11 representative football appearances. He had a brother called Frank (nicknamed "Dutchy") - who was also a professional rugby league player who has 91 appearances with the Western Suburbs club.

Matterson made his debut in 1922 in round 6 in a 12–3 loss to Balmain. He scored his first try of his career 7 rounds later against Newtown. Western Suburbs won that game 15–8. Matterson scored four more tries in 13 appearances that season. Western Suburbs finished with 6 wins and 10 losses to finish 6th out of nine teams. North Sydney defeated the Glebe Dirty Reds 35–3 to win the grand final.

Matterson and his brother both played with Western Suburbs between 1924 and 1929.

In his 4th representative football appearance, he scored three tries (nine points) with Metropolis to help the team win 11–5 against Orange. He scored three of his four representative tries in that one game. Matterson scored a try in a 10–10 draw with the Metropolis Seconds and Newcastle Seconds.
