= Michael Duke (rugby league) =

Australian rugby league footballer

Personal information
- Full name: Michael Duke
- Born: 12 May 1961 (age 63)

Playing information
- Position: Five-eighth, Lock, Second-row
Club
Years	Team	Pld	T	G	FG	P
1980–84	Western Suburbs	69	5	0	0	17
- Source: As of 10 January 2023

Michael Duke is an Australian former professional rugby league footballer who played in the 1980s. He played for Western Suburbs in the NSWRL competition.

== Playing career ==
Duke made his first grade debut in round 21 of the 1980 NSWRFL season against South Sydney at Lidcombe Oval. Duke played a total of 69 games for Western Suburbs across five seasons. Duke played one finals game for the club which was the 1982 minor preliminary semi-final against Eastern Suburbs which Wests lost 11–7.
