= Frank Matterson =

Australian rugby league footballer (1904–1980)

Personal information
- Full name: Francis Albert Matterson
- Born: 16 February 1904 Granville, New South Wales, Australia
- Died: 2 February 1980 (aged 75) Lidcombe, New South Wales, Australia

Playing information
- Position: Prop
Club
Years	Team	Pld	T	G	FG	P
1924–33	Western Suburbs	85	24	0	0	72
Representative
Years	Team	Pld	T	G	FG	P
1929	NSW	4	3	1	0	11
- Source: Whitacker/Hudson
- Relatives: Neil Matterson (brother)

Francis Albert Matterson (1904–1980) was an Australian rugby league player who played in the 1920s and 1930s.

Frank 'Dutchy' Matterson was a loyal player from the Western Suburbs Magpies. He played 85 games during a nine-year career at the club. Frank played for Wests between 1924 and 1933. He won a premiership with the club, playing in the 1930 Grand Final.

He also played for New South Wales on four occasions in 1929.

Frank 'Dutchy' Matterson died on 2 February 1980, aged 75.
