= Charles Rothwell (rugby league) =

Australian rugby league footballer

Personal information
- Full name: Charles George Rothwell
- Born: c. May 1894 Alexandria, New South Wales, Australia
- Died: 28 January 1917 (aged 22) Dernancourt, France

Playing information
- Height: 5 ft 10 in (178 cm)
- Weight: 168 lb (76 kg)
- Position: Wing
Club
Years	Team	Pld	T	G	FG	P
1912–1914	Western Suburbs	7	3	0	0	9

Charles George Rothwell (c. May 1894 – 28 January 1917) was an Australian rugby league footballer who played in the New South Wales Rugby League for Western Suburbs.

== Early life and rugby career ==
Rothwell was born c. May 1894 in Alexandria to John Thomas and Mary Ann Rothwell. Rothwell appeared for Western Suburbs between 1912 and 1914, playing 7 times, scoring 3 tries, and gaining 9 points.

== Personal life and military career ==
Rothwell worked as a clerk. On 3 June 1915, ten months after the outbreak of the First World War, he enlisted in the First Australian Imperial Force and was assigned as a private with the 18th Battalion. Wounded twice within the year, Rothwell was promoted to corporal on 13 October 1916, attaining the rank of sergeant within a month and a half. Rothwell was accidentally wounded whilst practicing with grenades on 27 January 1917 and was evacuated to the 45th Casualty Clearing Station in Dernancourt, where he died of wounds the following day. Rothwell was buried at the Dernancourt Communal Cemetery Extension.

== Career statistics ==
Appearances and goals by club, season and competition
Club	Season	Division	League				Other				Total			
Club	Season	Division	Apps	Tries	Goals	Points	Apps	Tries	Goals	Points	Apps	Tries	Goals	Points
Western Suburbs	1912	New South Wales Rugby League	1	1	0	3	0	0	0	0	1	1	0	3
Western Suburbs	1913	New South Wales Rugby League	4	0	0	0	0	0	0	0	4	0	0	0
Western Suburbs	1914	New South Wales Rugby League	1	1	0	3	0	0	0	0	1	1	0	3
Career total			6	2	0	6	1	1	0	3	7	3	0	9
