= Alan Neil =

Australian rugby league footballer

Personal information
- Full name: Alan Warren Neil
- Born: 27 January 1957 (age 68) Sydney, New South Wales, Australia

Playing information
- Position: Halfback
Club
Years	Team	Pld	T	G	FG	P
1977–82	Western Suburbs	60	22	0	2	68
1983–84	Eastern Suburbs	20	6	0	1	25
1985	St. George Dragons	3	0	0	0	0
	Total	83	28	0	3	93
- Source: Whiticker/Hudson
- Relatives: Mick Neil (brother)

Alan Neil (born 27 January 1957) is an Australian former rugby league footballer who played in the 1970s and 1980s.

== Playing career ==
A ginger headed halfback, Neil was a regular first grade player during the late 1970 and early 1980s. He played six seasons for Western Suburbs between 1977 and 1982, and became the club halfback after Tommy Raudonikis moved to the Newtown club in 1980.

He also was the first grade halfback for the Eastern Suburbs Roosters for two seasons between 1983 and 1984, and finished his career at the St. George Dragons in 1985. Neil was a reserve in the 1985 Grand Final. Alan Neil was the elder brother of former Balmain halfback Mick Neil.
