= Tony Wall (rugby league) =

Australian rugby league footballer

Personal information
- Full name: Tony Wall
- Born: 25 February 1971 (age 54)

Playing information
- Position: Wing
Club
| Years | Team | Pld | T | G | FG | P |
|---|---|---|---|---|---|---|
| 1995 | Western Suburbs | 10 | 4 | 9 | 0 | 34 |
| 1997 | Paris Saint-Germain | 9 | 3 | 3 | 0 | 18 |
| | Total | 19 | 7 | 12 | 0 | 52 |
- Source: As of 21 December 2022

Tony Wall is an Australian former professional rugby league footballer who played in the 1990s. He played for Western Suburbs in the ARL competition and for Paris Saint-Germain in the Super League.

== Playing career ==
Wall made his first grade debut for Western Suburbs in round 4 of the 1995 ARL season against Parramatta at Campbelltown Sports Stadium. After spending one season with Western Suburbs, Wall joined Paris Saint-Germain in the Super League for 1997. At the end of 1997, Paris Saint-Germain were liquidated and Wall did not play first grade rugby league again.
