= Andrew Willis (rugby league) =

Australian rugby league player

Personal information
- Born: 23 June 1973 (age 53) Australia

Playing information
- Position: Centre, Five-eighth, Halfback
Club
Years	Team	Pld	T	G	FG	P
1993–97	Western Suburbs	60	11	20	1	85
- Source: As of 31 May 2019

Andrew Willis (born 23 June 1973) is an Australian former professional rugby league footballer who played for the Western Suburbs Magpies in the 1990s. He played in a number of backline positions

== Club career ==
A Cootamundra junior, Willis made his debut for Wests in 1993, originally playing either second-row or starting from the bench. Throughout 1994 & 1995, Willis played five-eighth, but was unable to play more than a dozen games a season.

Willis is perhaps best remembered for kicking a 48-metre field goal to win a game against the North Sydney Bears in 1996, one of the longest of the modern era. Willis played every game of the 1996 season, and played in the semifinals, which was to be the Magpies last ever semis appearance.

Willis only played a further 10 games. He later stated his retirement was due to, "a couple of injuries," and not, "training as hard as I could." He was only 24 when he returned to playing local football with Camden. He captain-coached them to a premiership in 2000, scoring a try in what was described as a star performance. He represented Country Seconds that year.

Later, Willis coached for Greater Southern & the Western Suburbs Magpies SG Ball side.

== Sources ==
- Alan Whiticker & Glen Hudson (2007). The Encyclopedia of Rugby League Players. Wetherill Park, New South Wales: Gary Allen Pty Ltd. ISBN 978-1-877082-93-1.
