= 1916 NSWRFL season =

Rugby league competition

1916 New South Wales Rugby Football League
- Teams: 8
- Premiers: Balmain (2nd title)
- Minor premiers: Balmain (2nd title)
- Matches played: 57
- Points scored: 1174
- Top points scorer: Charles Fraser (94)
- Wooden spoon: Western Suburbs (5th spoon)
- Top try-scorer: Frank Burge (22)

The 1916 New South Wales Rugby Football League premiership was the ninth season of Sydney’s top-level professional rugby league competition, Australia’s first. Eight teams from across the city contested during the season which culminated in a grand final between Balmain and South Sydney.

== Season summary ==
Three teams dominated the season, Balmain, South Sydney and Glebe. With two rounds to go, each of the three teams had a genuine chance of winning the premiership with each separated by half a win. This created an interesting scenario with Balmain (20 points, first) facing South Sydney (18 points, third) and Glebe (19 points, second) facing Eastern Suburbs who were placed fourth at the time. As it turned out, Balmain lost 11–7 to Souths, leaving the competition wide open for Glebe to take the competition lead by one point. However, Glebe ended up losing crucially to Eastern Suburbs 8–5 on the same day. With both Balmain and Souths now equal on 20 points with one game to play, it would have taken a miracle for Glebe to come back given that they were still on 19 points. All three teams won their final games, but it was equal placed Balmain and South Sydney that would play off in a premiership decider.

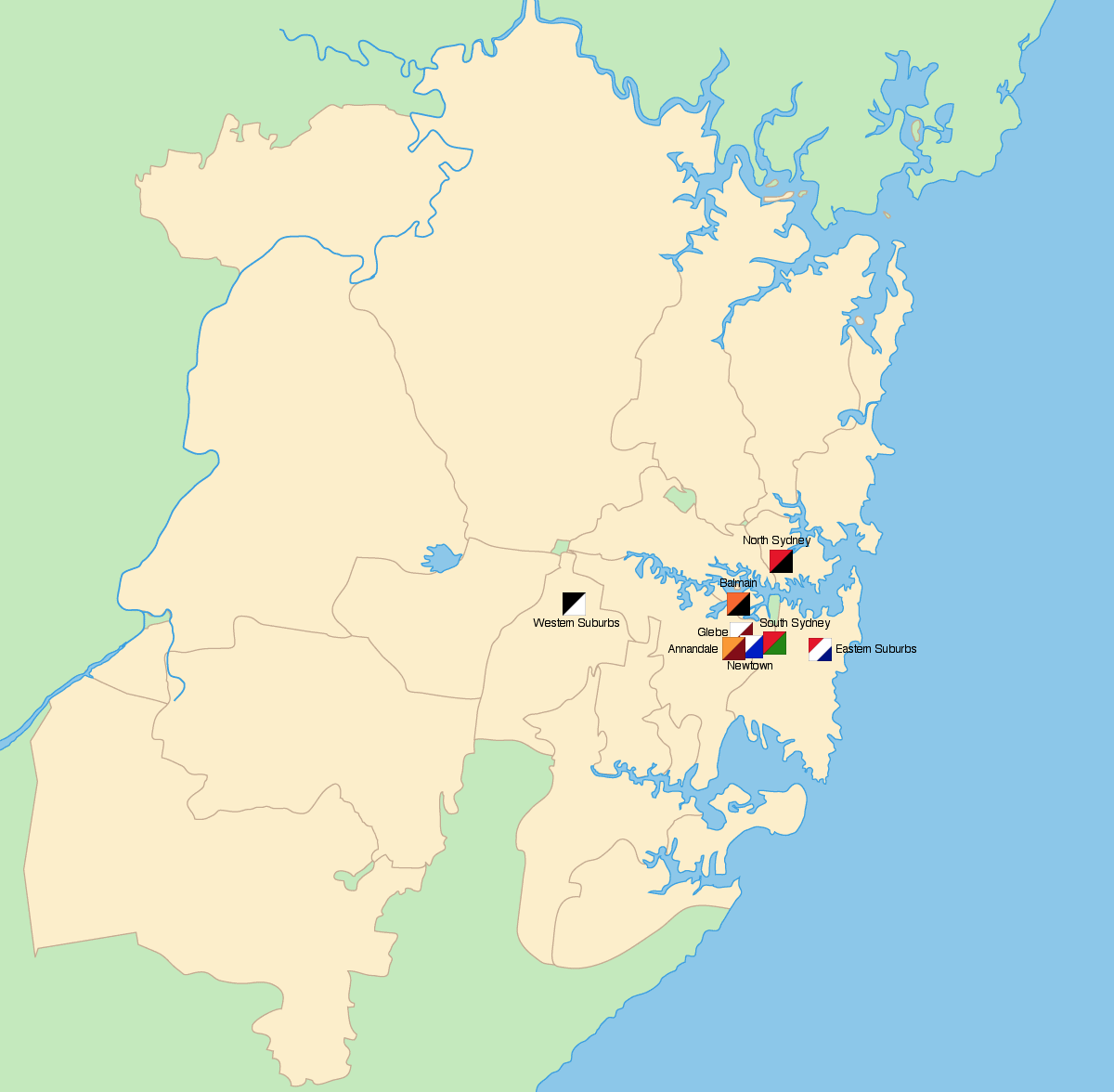
The geographical locations of the teams that contested the 1916 premiership across Sydney.

=== Teams ===
The teams remained unchanged from the previous season.

- Annandale
- Balmain, formed on January 23, 1908, at Balmain Town Hall
- Eastern Suburbs, formed on January 24, 1908, at Paddington Town Hall
- Glebe, formed on January 9, 1908
- Newtown, formed on January 14, 1908
- North Sydney, formed on February 7, 1908
- South Sydney, formed on January 17, 1908, at Redfern Town Hall
- Western Suburbs, formed on February 4, 1908

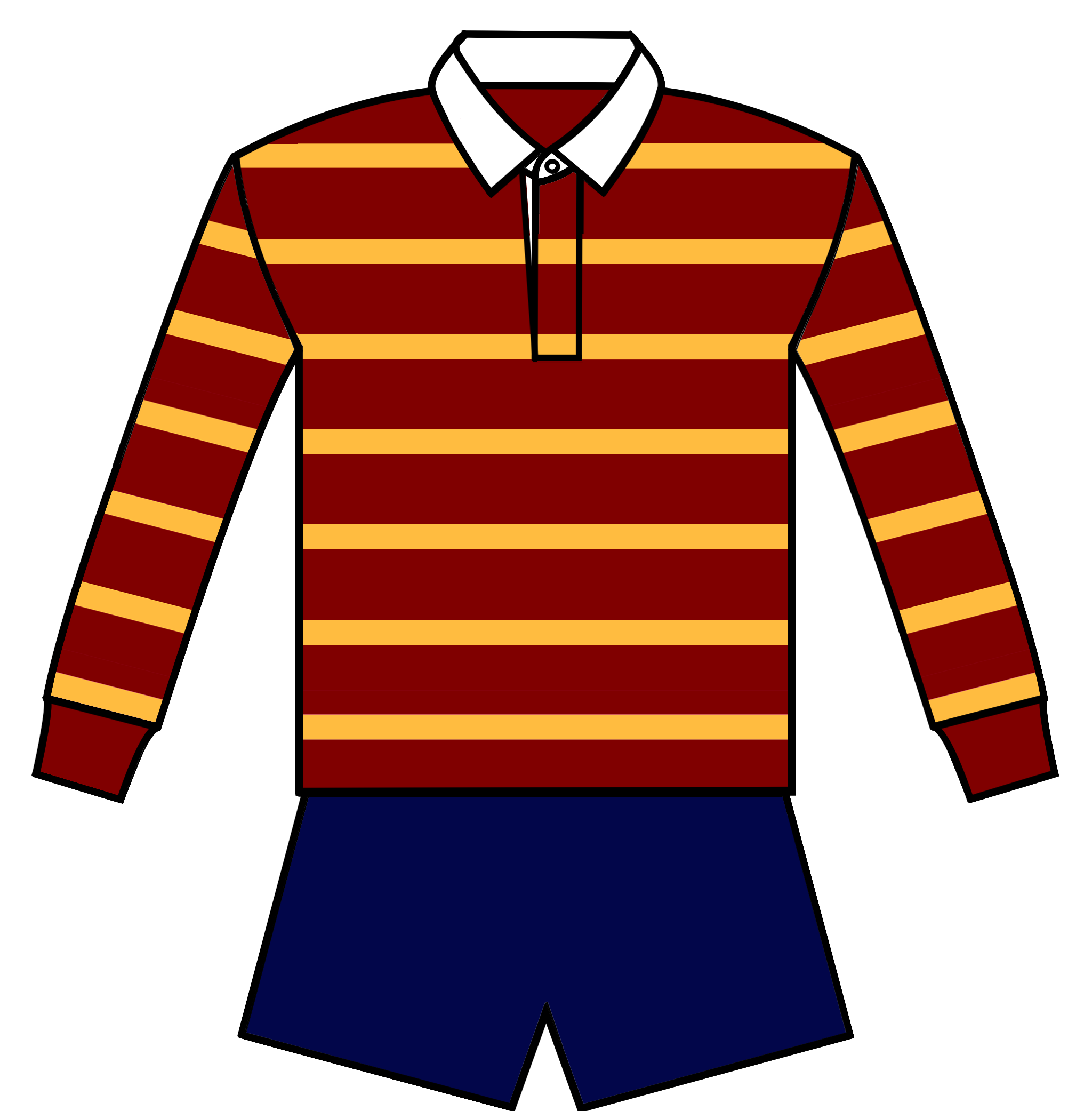
Annandale; 7th season Ground: Wentworth Park; Coach: Captain: Walter Haddock

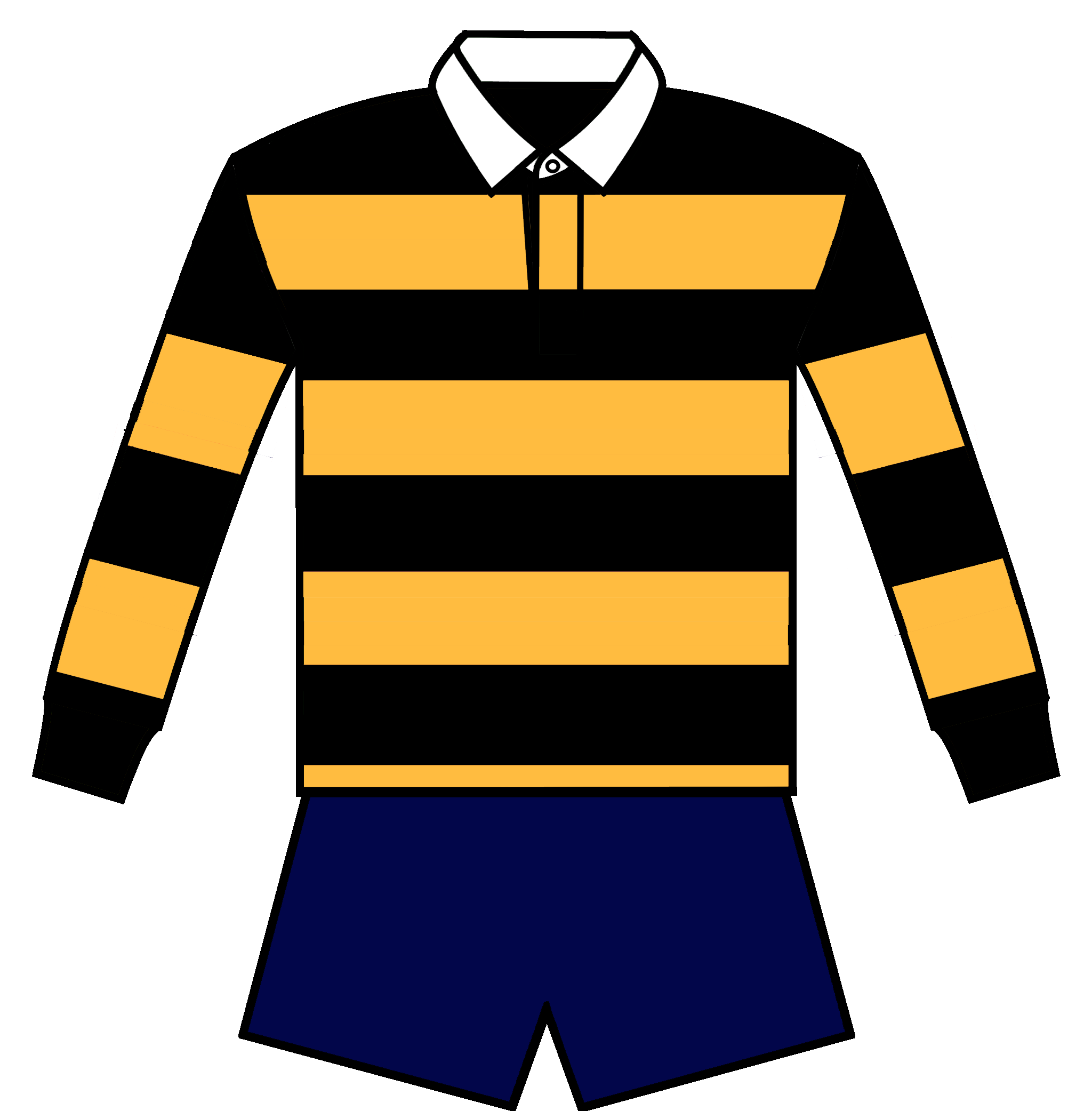
Balmain; 9th season Ground: Birchgrove Oval; Captain-coach: Arthur Halloway

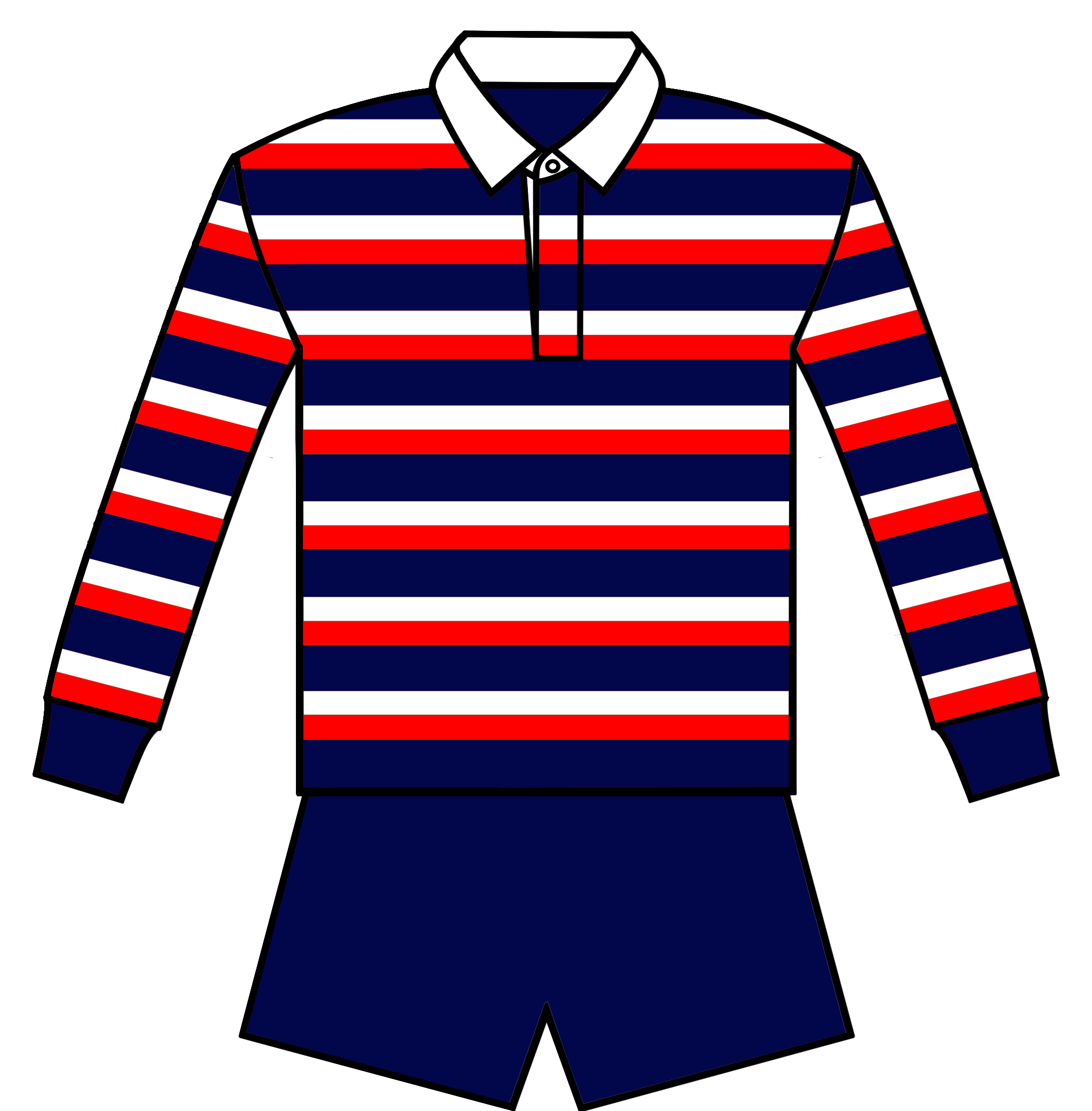
Eastern Suburbs; 9th season Ground: Sydney Sports Ground; Coach: Captain: Jack Watkins

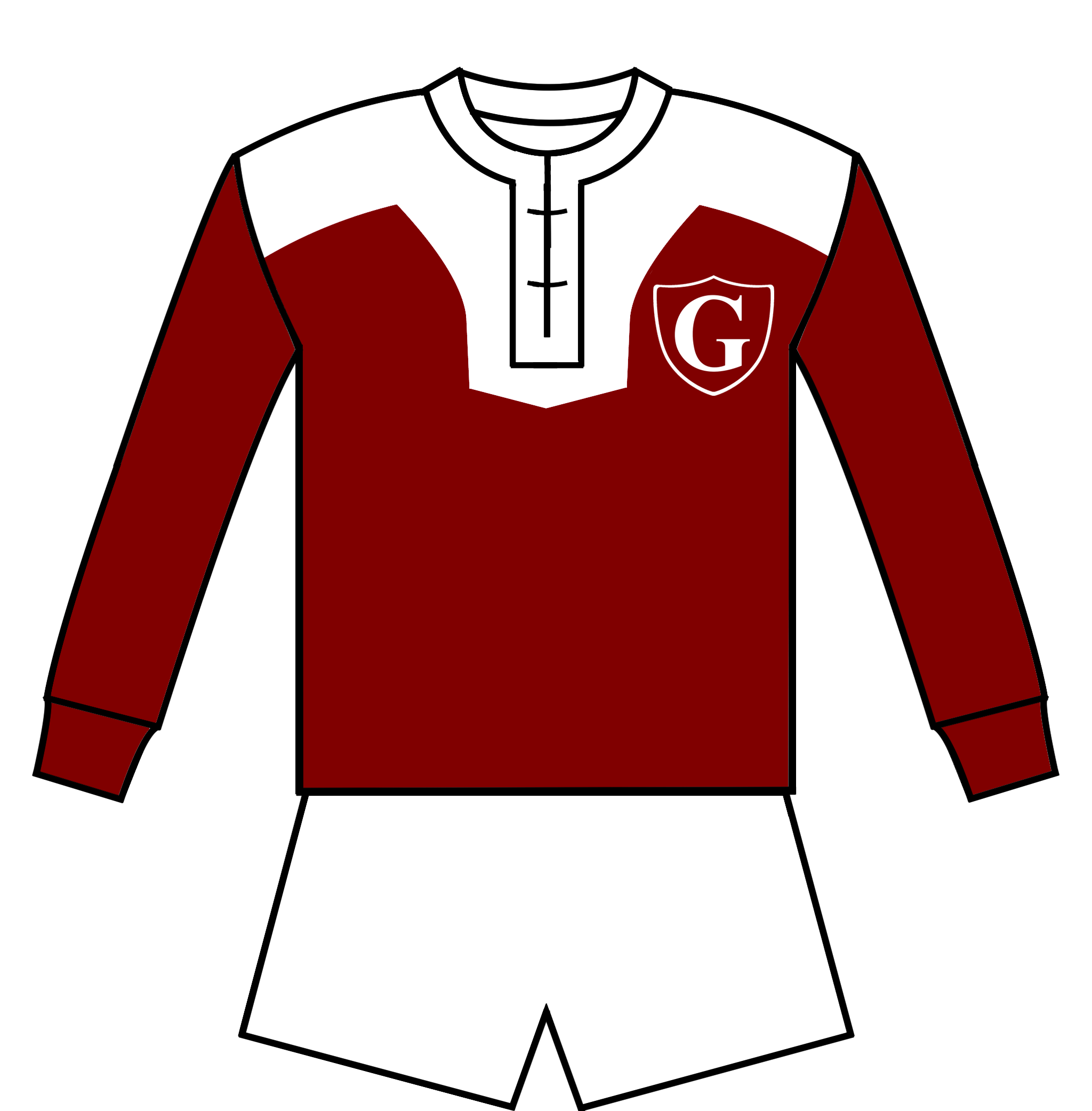
Glebe; 9th season Ground: Wentworth Park; Coach: Captain: Frank Burge

Newtown; 9th season Ground: Erskineville Oval; Coach: Captain: Paddy McCue

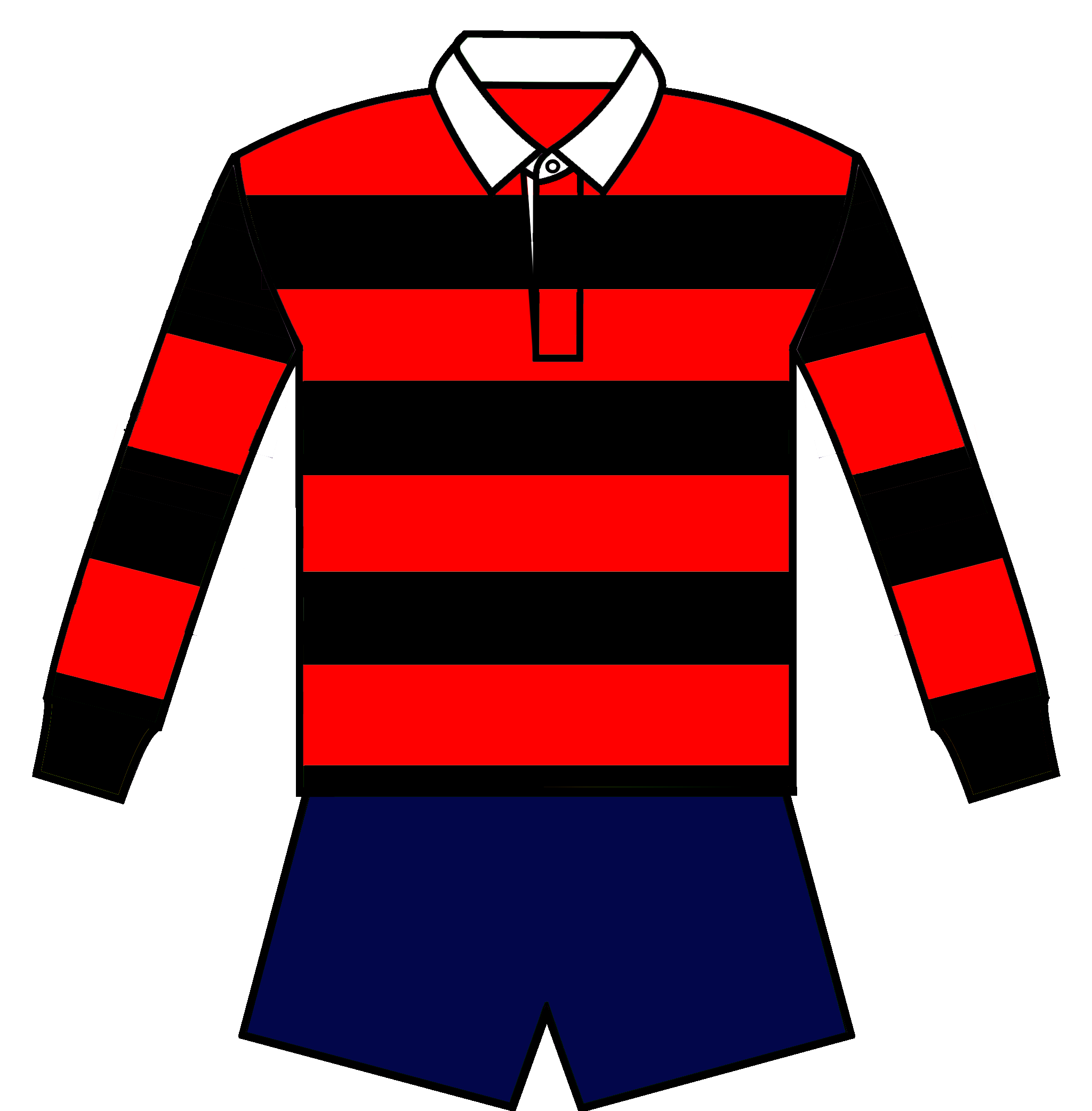
North Sydney; 9th season Ground: North Sydney Oval; Coach: Denis Lutge; Captain: Con Sullivan

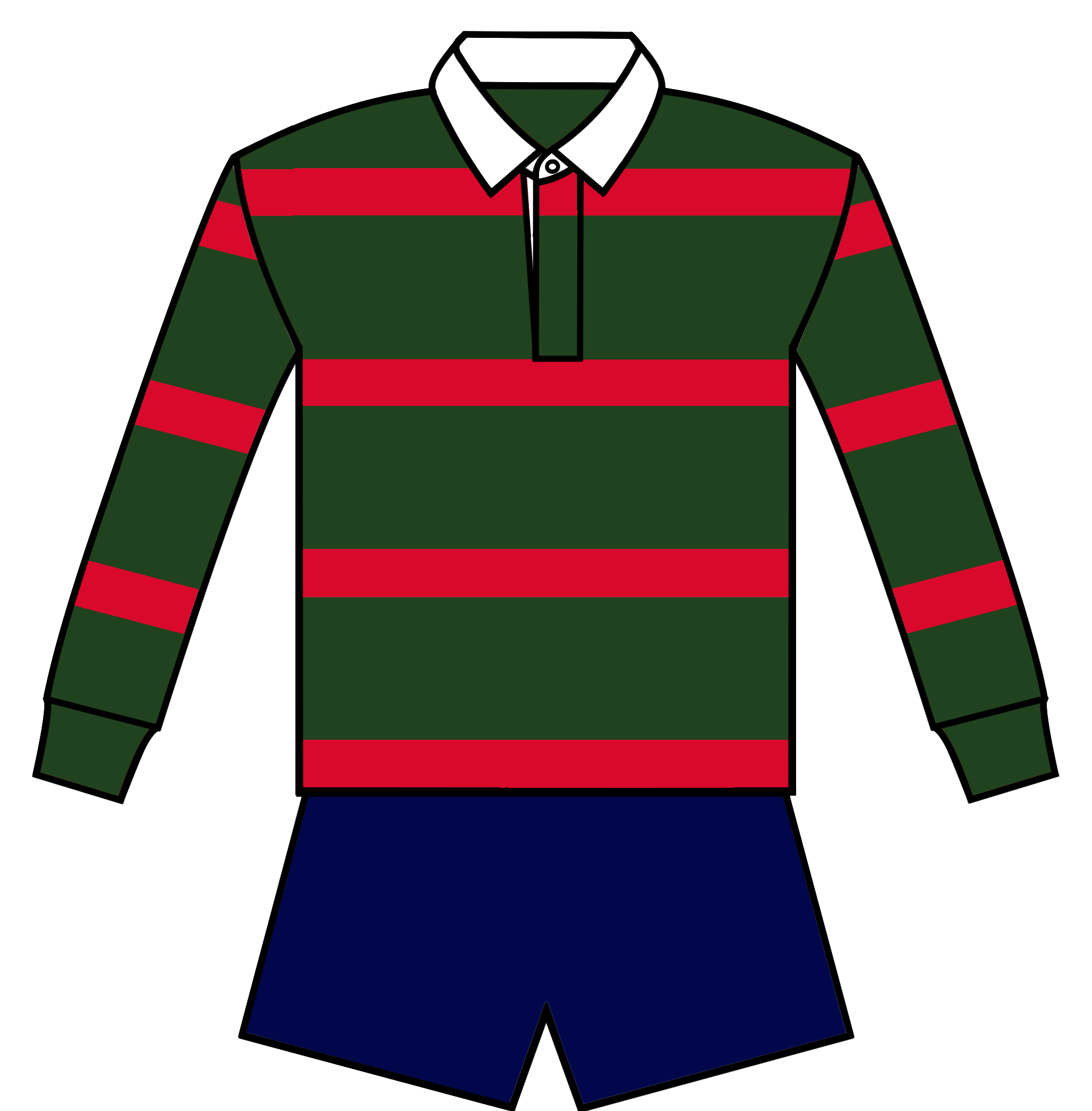
South Sydney; 9th season Ground: RAS Showground; Coach: Captain: Roy Almond

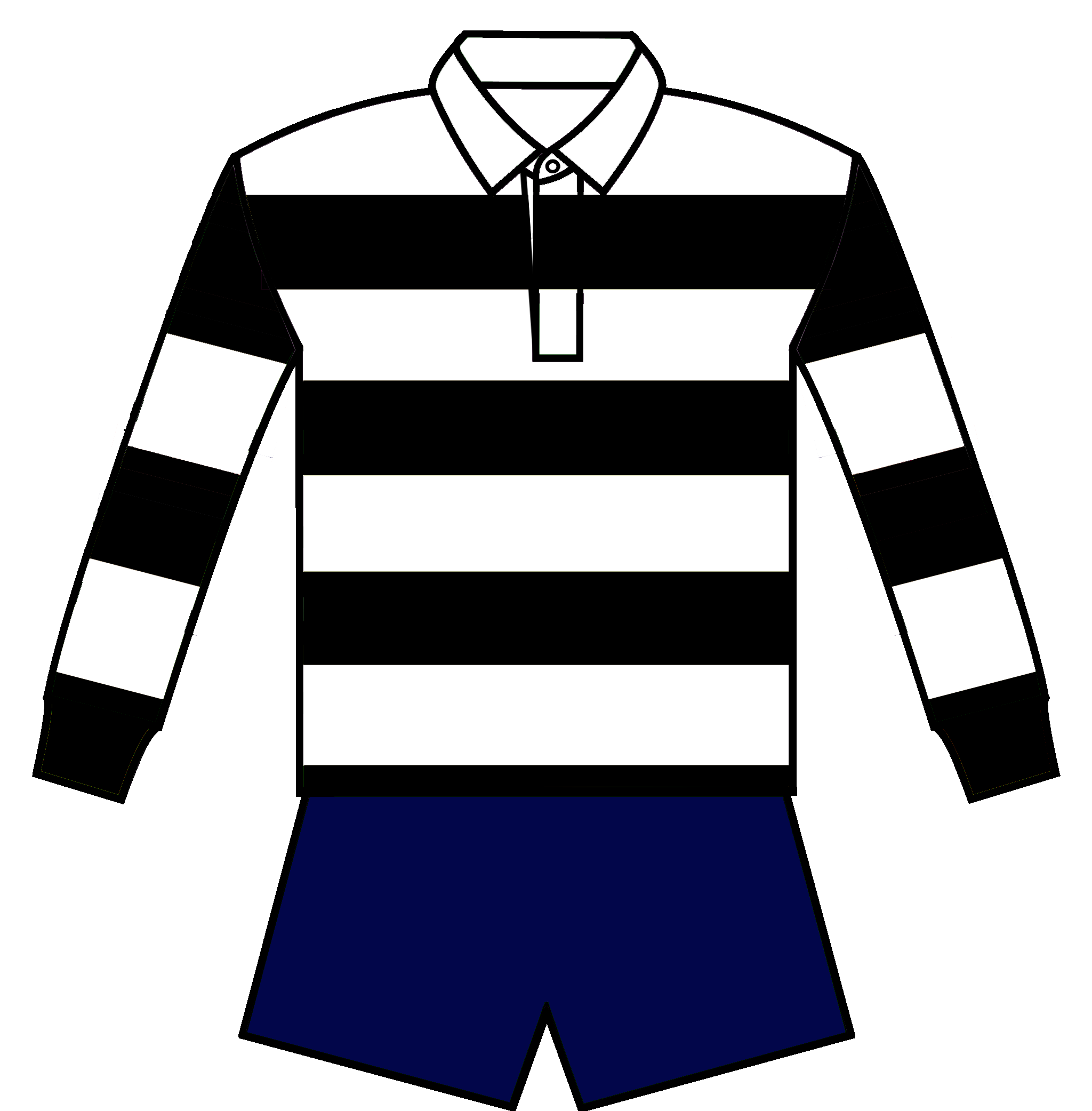
Western Suburbs; 9th season Ground: St. Lukes Oval; Coach: Captain: Harold Leddy

=== Ladder ===
	Team	Pld	W	D	L	PF	PA	PD	Pts
1	Balmain	14	11	0	3	181	100	+81	22
2	South Sydney	14	11	0	3	170	117	+53	22
3	Glebe	14	10	1	3	217	106	+111	21
4	Eastern Suburbs	14	7	2	5	170	89	+81	16
5	North Sydney	14	5	0	9	108	189	-81	10
6	Newtown	14	4	1	9	134	153	-19	9
7	Annandale	14	4	0	10	94	163	-69	8
8	Western Suburbs	14	2	0	12	92	249	-157	4

== Final ==
Balmain	Position	South Sydney
Lyall Wall	FB	Wally Dymant
Reg Latta	WG	Gordon Vaughan
Charles Fraser	CE	C. Phelps
Jim Craig	CE	Rex Norman
Jack 'Junker' Robinson	WG	Bill Cann
Albert "Rick" Johnston	FE	Roy Norman
Arthur Halloway (c)	HB	George McGowan
Alf Fraser	PR	Roy Almond
D. Cranston	HK	John Kerwick
Edward Burnicle	PR	Owen McCarthy
Bill Schultz	SR	Arthur Oxford
D. Stewart	SR	George Moore
Robert Craig	LK	Bill Groves

Having won all three grades in 1915 Balmain returned in 1916 to repeat the effort for a second straight season. At the conclusion of the season Balmain and Souths were equal aloft the premiership ladder with 22 points apiece. The League did not expect such a finish and a Final had to be scheduled. This Final was held at the Sydney Cricket Ground where they were to be held for many years to come. The game played on July 26, 1916, in front of just six thousand people, saw the lead change three times in the first half with Balmain ahead 5–3 at the break after a try by Arthur Halloway and a penalty goal by Charles “Chook” Fraser. The second half saw the game played predominantly on Balmain's line, with South Sydney putting on repeated attacks. However, the Balmain defence never gave in and the score didn't change by game's end – a two-point margin securing Balmain's second consecutive title.

Balmain 5 (Try: Arthur Halloway. Goal: Charles Fraser)

defeated

South Sydney 3 (Try: Gordon Vaughan )

Bob Craig

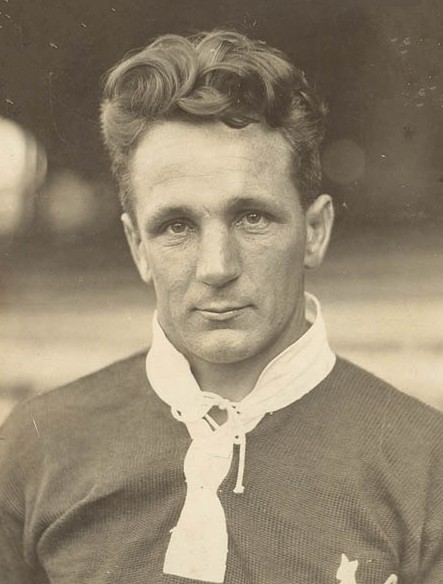
Jim Craig

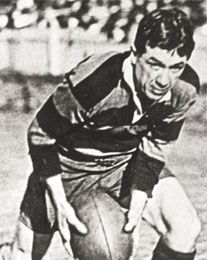
Pony Halloway

Ricketty Johnston

Bill Cann

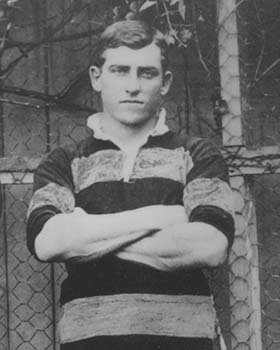
Chook Fraser
