= Don Parish (rugby league) =

Australian RL coach and former Australia international rugby league footballer

Personal information
- Full name: Don William Parish
- Born: 31 October 1937 (age 87); Dubbo, New South Wales, Australia

Playing information
- Position: Fullback
Club
Years	Team	Pld	T	G	FG	P
1958–60	Macquarie
1961–67	Western Suburbs	65	17	179	5	419
1968–70	Wests (Illawarra)
	Total	65	17	179	5	419
Representative
Years	Team	Pld	T	G	FG	P
1958–60	Country NSW	3	0	6	0	12
1959–61	New South Wales	5	3	8	0	25
1959–62	Australia	3	1	7	0	17
1962	City NSW	1	0	0	0	0

Coaching information
Club
Years	Team	Gms	W	D	L	W%
1972–76	Western Suburbs	110	48	6	56	44
1977–78	Penrith	44	12	3	29	27
	Total	154	60	9	85	39

Don Parish is an Australian former professional rugby league footballer who played in the 1950s, 1960s and 1970s, and coached in the 1970s. An Australia international and New South Wales state representative goal-kicking fullback or three-quarter back, he played club football in Sydney's NSWRFL Premiership for the Western Suburbs club, as well as elsewhere in New South Wales. Parish later coached Wests and Penrith.

== Playing career ==
Hailing from the country New South Wales town of Dubbo, Parish played for the Macquarie club, becoming their first international when he was selected to go on the 1959/60 Kangaroo tour.

In 1959 Parish scored a try and kicked three goals in the New South Wales team's loss to Queensland that attracted 35,261 spectators, smashing Brisbane's previous record for an interstate match of 22,817. Later that year he became Kangaroo No. 358 when selected as a non-playing reserve in the Test series against New Zealand. Parish then toured with the 1959-60 Kangaroos and played in 12 matches (no Tests) and scored 55 points (7 tries, 17 goals).

Parish started playing first grade in the Sydney premiership for the Western Suburbs club in the 1961 NSWRFL season and that year toured New Zealand with the Australian side, making his Test debut. In the 12-10 First Test loss in Auckland he had the distinction of becoming the first Australian fullback to score a try in a Test match and was the tour's leading point-scorer with 58 points (4 tries, 23 goals). At the end of the season he played at fullback in Wests' loss to St. George in the grand final.

In 1962 Parish played in Australia's First Test loss to Great Britain, which was his last international match. That season he was the League's top point-scorer. In 1963 he again played fullback for Wests in another grand final defeat by St. George. Parish's last season playing for Wests was 1967.

== Coaching career ==
Following his retirement from the playing field, Parish coached on the Southern New South Wales coast, taking the Illawarra Rugby League's Western Suburbs club to premierships in 1969 and 1970, as well as coaching the Illawarra group team to victory in the Country Divisional Championship.

At the end of the 1971 NSWRFL season Parish was appointed to take over from Ron Watson as Western Suburbs' first grade coach. He coached the club until 1976, moving to Penrith in 1977. Half-way through the 1978 NSWRFL season, Len Stacker was appointed to replace Parish as Penrith head coach at the season's end.
