= Edward Courtney =

Edward Courtney may refer to:

- Sir Edward Courtney, character in the film, The Courtneys of Curzon Street
- Edward Courtney (classicist) (1932–2019), a Northern Irish classical scholar
- Edward Courtney (Jesuit), see Oath of Allegiance of James I of England
- Tedda Courtney (Joseph Edward Courtney, 1883–1957), Australian rugby league footballer and coach
- Ed Courtney Jr. (1905–1986), his son, Australian rugby league footballer

== See also ==
- Edward Courtenay (disambiguation)
