= Peter Gentle =

Australian rugby league footballer and coach

Personal information
- Born: 26 September 1965 (age 61) Sydney, New South Wales, Australia

Playing information
- Position: Halfback
Club
Years	Team	Pld	T	G	FG	P
1987–88	St. George Dragons	3	0	0	0	0
1986–87	Mansfield Marksman	20	1	0	0	4
	Total	23	1	0	0	4

Coaching information
Club
Years	Team	Gms	W	D	L	W%
2012–13	Hull F.C.	64	34	4	24	53
2020	Brisbane Broncos	5	0	0	5	0
	Total	69	34	4	29	49
- Source: Whittiker/Hudson
- Father: Ken Gentle

Peter Gentle (born 26 September 1965) is an Australian former rugby league coach and former footballer who played in the 1980s. Gentle is currently the Recruitment Manager of Manly Warringah Sea Eagles.

== Club career ==
A halfback and St. George junior, Gentle played three games of first grade for St. George Dragons over two seasons between 1987–1988, featuring mostly in the lower grades. Prior to that, he had played for Mansfield Marksman in the Rugby Football League in England during the 1986–87 season. He is the son of former Western Suburbs Magpies and Canterbury-Bankstown Bulldogs coach, Ken Gentle.

== Coaching career ==
Gentle captain-coached the Camden Rams to consecutive Group 6 Rugby League first grade premierships in 1997 and 1998. Coached Western Suburbs Magpies to a SG Ball Premiership in 2002.

Gentle was employed as the head coach of Hull FC in the English Super League in 2012 and 2013. In Australia, he has worked as an assistant coach for various National Rugby League clubs, including Parramatta Eels, Wests Tigers, Cronulla-Sutherland Sharks, South Sydney Rabbitohs and Brisbane Broncos. In international rugby league, he has additionally worked as an assistant coach for both Australia and Italy.

Gentle was appointed as acting head coach of the Brisbane Broncos from 26 August 2020 following the resignation of Anthony Seibold. Following the conclusion of the 2020 NRL Season, Gentle departed the Brisbane Broncos. On September 28, 2020, it was announced that Gentle will be an Assistant Coach at the St. George Illawarra Dragons to Head Coach Anthony Griffin.
