= Beger =

Beger is a surname. Notable people with the surname include:

- Albert Beger (born 1959), Israeli saxophonist
- Bruno Beger (1911–2009), German racial anthropologist and ethnologist
- Dudley Beger (1929–1994), Australian rugby league footballer
- Mario Beger (born 1966), German politician
- Renata Beger (born 1958), Polish politician
