= Albert McGuinness =

Australian rugby league footballer and coach

Personal information
- Full name: Albert Bernard McGuiness
- Born: 25 March 1916 Burwood, New South Wales, Australia
- Died: 7 April 1991 (aged 75)

Playing information
- Position: Halfback, Five-eighth
Club
Years	Team	Pld	T	G	FG	P
1933–43	Western Suburbs	98	25	17	0	109
Representative
Years	Team	Pld	T	G	FG	P
1941	New South Wales	3	0	6	0	12
1941	NSW City	1	0	0	0	0

Coaching information
Club
Years	Team	Gms	W	D	L	W%
1942	Western Suburbs	14	2	0	12	14
- Source: As of 4 July 2019

Albert McGuinness nicknamed "Podgy" was an Australian professional rugby league footballer who played in the 1930s and 1940s. He played for Western Suburbs in the New South Wales Rugby League (NSWRL) competition.

== Playing career ==
McGuinness made his first grade debut for Western Suburbs against North Sydney in Round 11 1933 at North Sydney Oval. Western Suburbs would go on to finish the 1933 season in last place on the table. In 1934, Western Suburbs had a complete form reversal as they finished minor premiers and the premiership defeating Eastern Suburbs in the grand final. McGuinness was overlooked for selection in the decider.

The change in form was attributed to the fact that Western Suburbs lost players such as Frank McMillan and Alan Ridley who were away on tour with the Australian team when the club finished last but returned for the start of the 1934 season. As of the 2023 NRL season, no club has gone from wooden spooners to premiers the following season since Western Suburbs achieved this feat.

After the premiership victory in 1934, Western Suburbs went through a period of decline and finished last in 1940, 1942 and 1943. McGuinness became a regular member of the team during this time and was selected to play for New South Wales and New South Wales City in 1941. In 1942, McGuinness captain-coached Western Suburbs with limited success.
