= Bruce Gibbs =

Australian rugby league footballer

Personal information
- Full name: Bruce Gibbs
- Born: Oberon, New South Wales

Playing information
- Position: Prop
Club
Years	Team	Pld	T	G	FG	P
1975–76	Workington Town
1977	Newtown	12	2	0	0	6
1978–80	Western Suburbs	49	4	0	0	12
	Total	61	6	0	0	18
Representative
Years	Team	Pld	T	G	FG	P
1976	Other Nationalities	1	0	0	0	0
- Source: Whiticker/Hudson

Bruce Gibbs is an Australian former rugby league footballer who played in the 1970s and 1980s from Oberon, New South Wales. His position of choice was at prop. He first played for Workington Town in England between 1975 and 1976. That year he also played for the Other Nationalities side. He then moved to Australia where he played for his first Australian club, Newtown, in 1977, playing twelve games and scoring two tries. He then signed for Western Suburbs and played at the club between 1978 and 1980 where he formed a front row partnership with John Donnelly. He made a total of 49 appearances for the club, scoring four tries.
