= Ken Gentle =

Australian rugby league coach

Coaching information
Club
Years	Team	Gms	W	D	L	W%
1984–85	Western Suburbs	48	6	2	40	13
- Relatives: Peter Gentle (son)

Ken Gentle is an Australian former rugby league coach for the Western Suburbs Magpies.

Gentle served his coaching apprenticeship with Kiama, which he guided to a premiership in 1969. He had charge of Canterbury-Bankstown junior sides during the 1970s, culminating in SG Ball and Jersey Flegg premierships in 1978 and 1979 respectively. Following a stint with the Western Suburbs under-23s and reserves, Gentle returned to Canterbury in 1983, to coach their reserves team.

At the end of the 1983 season, Gentle took over from Len Stacker as first-grade coach of Western Suburbs. He was appointed during a tumultuous pre-season, losing several of his players to rival clubs as the result of a decision by the NSWRL, later reversed, to omit them from the competition. Before they were re-admitted, Gentle had been set to return to Canterbury's reserves. He led the Magpies for two seasons, then in 1986 was replaced by Steve Ghosn.

Gentle's son Peter Gentle played for St. George and was an acting head coach of the Brisbane Broncos.
