= Max Gray =

Australian rugby league player (1911-1989)

Personal information
- Full name: Maxwell Alan Gray
- Born: 3 July 1911 Goulburn, New South Wales, Australia
- Died: 1 March 1989 (aged 77)

Playing information
- Position: Second-row, Lock
Club
Years	Team	Pld	T	G	FG	P
1934–36	Western Suburbs	32	6	0	0	18
1940	Western Suburbs	14	1	0	0	3
	Total	46	7	0	0	21

Coaching information
Club
Years	Team	Gms	W	D	L	W%
1940	Western Suburbs

Maxwell Alan Gray was an Australian Rugby League footballer who played in the 1930s and 1940s. He played for Western Suburbs in the NSWRL competition.

== Playing career ==
Gray made his first grade debut for Western Suburbs in Round 1 1934 against Balmain at Leichhardt Oval. In the same season, Western Suburbs went from wooden spooners in 1933 to winning the minor premiership and premiership in 1934.

The change in form was attributed to the fact that Western Suburbs lost players such as Frank McMillan and Alan Ridley who were away on tour with the Australian team when the club finished last but returned for the start of the 1934 season.

Gray played in the 1934 grand final victory over Eastern Suburbs at the Sydney Sports Ground. The final had been delayed for over a week due to heavy rain and Wests went into the match as underdogs with Easts boasting players such as future immortal David Brown, Viv Thicknesse, Ray Stehr, Andy Norval and Cliff Pearce. As of the 2019 season, no other team since Western Suburbs has come from last place to winning the premiership the following year.

Gray was captain-coach of West Wyalong when they won the 1938 Group 9 premiership.

Gray returned to play with Western Suburbs for a season as captain-coach in 1940 before retiring.
