= Paul Smith (rugby league) =

Australian rugby league footballer

Personal information
- Born: 24 December 1969 (age 56)

Playing information
- Position: Wing
Club
Years	Team	Pld	T	G	FG	P
1987–93	Penrith Panthers	78	27	0	0	108
1994–97	Western Suburbs	41	22	0	0	88
	Total	119	49	0	0	196
Representative
Years	Team	Pld	T	G	FG	P
1991	NSW City	1	1	0	0	4

Paul Smith (born 24 December 1969) is an Australian former professional rugby league footballer who played for the Penrith Panthers and Western Suburbs Magpies.

Smith, a product of Ashcroft High School in Sydney, played his football as a winger.

Debuting in 1987, Smith spent seven seasons in the Penrith first-grade side. He scored a try in Penrith's four-point grand final loss to the Canberra Raiders in 1990, then featured in the club's 1991 premiership team, this time overcoming Canberra. In 1991 he was a City representative in the annual City vs Country Origin match.

From 1994 to 1997 he played for Western Suburbs. He made an immediate impact in the 1994 season when his 18 tries equalled the club record, set by Alan Ridley in 1932. His tally was equal fourth in the league that season.
