= Bill Carson (rugby league) =

Australia international rugby league footballer

Personal information
- Full name: William Clarence Carson
- Born: 28 January 1934 Bourke, New South Wales, Australia
- Died: 15 January 1985 (aged 50) Sydney, New South Wales, Australia

Playing information
- Position: Prop
Club
Years	Team	Pld	T	G	FG	P
1954–64	Western Suburbs	118	24	0	0	72
Representative
Years	Team	Pld	T	G	FG	P
1962	New South Wales	2	0	0	0	0
1962	Australia	2	0	0	0	0
- Source: As of 4 July 2019

Bill Carson (1934–1985) was an Australian professional rugby league footballer who played in the 1950s and 1960s. An Australia national and New South Wales state representative forward, he played his club football in the New South Wales Rugby Football League for Sydney's Western Suburbs club.

== Playing career ==
Carson played for Wests in the 1958 NSWRFL season's and 1961 NSWRFL season's grand finals. His two international appearances were for Australia in the 2nd and 3rd games of the 1962 Ashes series.

Carson was involved in one of the most talked about and controversial passages of play in rugby league test match history in 1962. In the third Ashes test against Great Britain at the Sydney Cricket Ground, referee Darcy Lawler awarded a try to Ken Irvine late in the game, ignoring a forward pass from Bill Carson amid howls of protest from Lions players.

He is listed on the Australian Players Register as Kangaroo No.373.

== Post playing ==
After retiring, Carson commenced a long career in administration with the Wests club, serving as club president in the 1970s and 1980s.

In 2004, Bill Carson was honoured by being named in the Western Suburbs Team of the Century.
