= Ted Mead =

Australian rugby league footballer

Personal information
- Full name: Ted Mead
- Born: 23 July 1882 Bathurst, New South Wales, Australia
- Died: 3 November 1951 (aged 69)

Playing information
- Position: Prop, Second-row, Lock
Club
Years	Team	Pld	T	G	FG	P
1908–12	Western Suburbs	47	4	0	0	12
Representative
Years	Team	Pld	T	G	FG	P
1908	Metropolis	1	0	0	0	0
1909	New South Wales	1	1	0	0	3
- Source: As of 24 June 2019
- Relatives: Les Mead (son)

Ted Mead was an Australian rugby league footballer who played in the 1900s and 1910s. He played for Western Suburbs in the New South Wales Rugby League (NSWRL) competition. Mead was a foundation player for Western Suburbs. Mead was the father of Les Mead who was a premiership winning player with Wests in the 1930s.

== Playing career ==
Mead made his first grade debut for Western Suburbs against Balmain in Round 1 1908 at Birchgrove Oval which was also the opening week of the New South Wales Rugby League (NSWRL) competition in Australia. Balmain would go on to win the match 24-0. Mead played in Western Suburbs first ever victory against Newtown in Round 9 1908 at Wentworth Park which ended with a score of 6-5. The win would be Western Suburbs only victory of the season and the club finished last on the table claiming the wooden spoon.

Western Suburbs would go on to finish last in 1909 and 1910. Wests nearly finished last in 1911 but finished just above Balmain on the ladder. Mead's final season for Wests in 1912 ended with another wooden spoon with the club winning only 1 game all year.

At representative level, Mead played for Metropolis and New South Wales.
