= Wayne Smith (rugby league) =

Australian rugby league player

Personal information
- Full name: Wayne Smith
- Born: 18 August 1956 (age 68); Sydney, New South Wales, Australia

Playing information
- Position: Fullback, Centre, Wing
Club
| Years | Team | Pld | T | G | FG | P |
|---|---|---|---|---|---|---|
| 1976–84 | Western Suburbs | 160 | 48 | 3 | 0 | 154 |
| 1985–86 | Cronulla Sharks | 17 | 3 | 1 | 0 | 14 |
| | Total | 177 | 51 | 4 | 0 | 168 |

Wayne Smith is an Australian former professional Rugby League footballer who played in the 1970s and 1980s. He played for Western Suburbs and Cronulla-Sutherland in the NSWRL competition.

== Playing career ==
Smith made his first grade debut for Western Suburbs in 1976.

In 1978, Western Suburbs finished as minor premiers and look favorites to make their first grand final since 1963 under new coach Roy Masters who turned the club from also-rans to premiership contenders.

Wests went on to lose both finals games, Smith missed out playing in the first finals game against Cronulla but returned in time to play in the club's 14–7 preliminary final loss against Manly-Warringah.

In 1979, Smith finished as the club's top try scorer as Wests finished 4th on the table. Wests were knocked out of the finals series in the first week, losing to Canterbury-Bankstown.

In 1980, Wests finished third, with Smith playing 22 games. Western Suburbs reached the preliminary final but were thrashed 41–5 by Eastern Suburbs.

Smith played on with Wests until the end of the 1984 season as the club began to decline after Masters departed along with several other players due to the club's financial situation.

Western Suburbs were initially kicked out of the competition at the end of 1983 along with foundation club Newtown, but Wests won on appeal to be reinstated. Smith's last two seasons in 1983 and 1984 at Western Suburbs ended with the wooden spoon.

In 1985, Smith joined Cronulla-Sutherland and played two seasons with them before retiring at the end of 1986.

== Post playing ==
In 2012, Smith was inducted into the Western Suburbs Hall of Fame.
