= Edward Burnicle =

Australian rugby league footballer

Personal information
- Full name: Edward Burnicle
- Born: 1890; Paddington, New South Wales
- Died: 18 February 1931 (aged 40–41); Five Dock, New South Wales

Playing information
- Position: Prop, Second-row
Club
Years	Team	Pld	T	G	FG	P
1915–18	Balmain	31	4	0	0	12
1921	Western Suburbs	2	0	0	0	0
	Total	33	4	0	0	12

Edward Burnicle (1890–1931) was an Australian rugby league footballer who played in the 1910s and 1920s.

== Playing career ==
Born at Paddington, New South Wales to parents Henry and Elizabeth Burnicle, Burnicle played for Balmain for four years between 1915 and 1918, and he also played one season for Western Suburbs in 1921. The highlight of his career was winning a premiership with Balmain, playing prop forward in the 1916 Grand Final. He also played for Balmain when the club won the premiership in 1915 and 1917.

== Death ==
Burnicle died on 18 February 1931, at Five Dock, New South Wales as a result of an accident.
