= Ken Hey =

Australian rugby league footballer

Personal information
- Full name: Ken Hey
- Born: 23 March 1956 (age 69)

Playing information
- Position: Five-eighth, Centre
Club
Years	Team	Pld	T	G	FG	P
1975–77	Western Suburbs	27	2	0	0	6
1978	Parramatta Eels	12	1	0	0	3
1980	Western Suburbs	5	0	0	0	0
1981	Penrith Panthers	11	1	0	0	3
1984	Parramatta Eels	1	0	0	0	0
	Total	56	4	0	0	12
- Source: As of 4 January 2023

Ken Hey is an Australian former professional rugby league footballer who played in the 1970s and 1980s. He played for Penrith, Western Suburbs and Parramatta in the NSWRL competition.

== Playing career ==
Hey made his first grade debut for Western Suburbs in round 9 of the 1975 NSWRFL season against Balmain at Lidcombe Oval. Hey started at five-eighth in Western Suburbs 31-15 victory. In 1977, Hey played in Wests 1977 Amco Cup final victory over Eastern Suburbs at Leichhardt Oval. Hey played 27 games in his first spell at Wests and then signed for Parramatta. Hey played 12 games for Parramatta in 1978 including two finals games against Canterbury and Manly. By 1980, Hey was back at Wests but only made five appearances for the club. In 1981, Hey joined Penrith and played 11 games for the club as they finished second last on the table. After three years out of first grade, Hey made one last appearance at the top level which was for the three time defending premiers Parramatta against Balmain at Leichhardt Oval. The match finished in a 12-2 victory for the club.
