= Les Mead =

Australian RL coach and former Australia international rugby league footballer

Personal information
- Full name: Leslie Edward Huon Mead
- Born: 9 June 1909 Mosman, New South Wales, Australia
- Died: 21 October 1996 (aged 87) Killarney Vale, New South Wales, Australia

Playing information
- Position: Halfback
Club
Years	Team	Pld	T	G	FG	P
1930	Western Suburbs	5	3	3	0	15
1931	Wauchope
1932–37	Western Suburbs	70	27	169	0	419
1938–40	Wauchope
1941	Western Suburbs	2	0	0	0	0
	Total	77	30	172	0	434
Representative
Years	Team	Pld	T	G	FG	P
1933–35	New South Wales	3	0	4	0	8
1933	Australia	1	0	0	0	0

Coaching information
Club
Years	Team	Gms	W	D	L	W%
1941	Western Suburbs	14	6	0	8	43
- Father: Ted Mead

Les Mead (1909–1996) was an Australian professional rugby league footballer who played in the 1930s. A New South Wales interstate and Australian international representative goal-kicking half back, he played his club football in the New South Wales Rugby Football League Premiership with Western Suburbs.

== Playing career ==
Son of Sydney's Western Suburbs' club pioneer Ted Mead, Mead started his career in Sydney before playing as captain-coach of Wauchope on New South Wales' North Coast in 1931 but returned to Wests the following year. With Western Suburbs he formed an effective partnership in the halves with Vic Hey. Mead was the top point-scorer of the 1932 NSWRFL season with 104 points (10 tries and 37 goals). In 1933 he was selected to represent New South Wales and later that year went on the 1933–34 Kangaroo tour of Great Britain. In August 1933, while in England, Mead played for Australia against England in a novel 7-a-side match. He played several matches while on tour but only one Test match. He is listed on the Australian Players Register as Kangaroo No. 186. The following year Mead kicked two goals in Wests' premiership final victory.

In 1935 Mead was named captain of Western Suburbs. That season he also scored a club record 27 points in a premiership match and made his final appearance for New South Wales. After the 1937 NSWRFL season he returned to Wauchope, but went back to Wests to end his career with them in 1941 as captain-coach.
