= Edward Courtenay =

Edward Courtenay may refer to:

- Edward de Courtenay, 3rd/11th Earl of Devon (c. 1357–1419)
- Sir Edward de Courtenay (c. 1385–1418)
- Edward Courtenay, 1st Earl of Devon (1485 creation) (died 1509), English nobleman
- Edward Courtenay, 1st Earl of Devon (1526–1556), English nobleman
- Edward Courtenay, 12th Earl of Devon (1836–1891), British peer and politician
- Ed Courtenay (born 1968), ice hockey player

== See also ==
- Edward Courtney (disambiguation)
