= Steve Ghosn =

Australian rugby league coach (born 1953)

Personal information
- Born: 1 April 1953 (age 72); Newtown, New South Wales, Australia

Coaching information
Club
Years	Team	Gms	W	D	L	W%
1986–87	Western Suburbs	48	13	3	32	27
Representative
Years	Team	Gms	W	D	L	W%
	Lebanon

Steve Ghosn (born 1 April 1953) is an Australian former rugby league coach for the Western Suburbs Magpies.

One of 10 siblings, Ghosn was born to Lebanese parents in the Sydney suburb of Newtown. He is the brother of Western Suburbs player George Ghosn and has another brother Tony who competed for the club in the lower grades. At the age of 16, Ghosn became a professional boxer and was trained by Johnny Lewis, best known as the trainer of Jeff Fenech. He played rugby league locally in Sydney's western suburbs as a five-eighth and halfback.

Ghosn coached Lidcombe to two Western Suburbs junior premierships, then coached the Magpies in the 1982 President's Cup, before being appointed third grade coach in 1983. He coached the thirds to a fourth-place finish in 1984 and was promoted to reserve coach the following year. In 1986, Ghosn replaced Ken Gentle as coach of first grade and led the club for two seasons. He coached the Lebanon national team in the late 1990s.
