= John Donnelly (rugby league) =

Australian rugby league footballer

Personal information
- Full name: John William Donnelly
- Born: 3 September 1954 Gunnedah, New South Wales, Australia
- Died: 22 February 1986 (aged 31) Byron Bay, New South Wales, Australia

Playing information
- Position: Prop
Club
Years	Team	Pld	T	G	FG	P
	Gunnedah
1975–84	Western Suburbs	144	6	6	4	34
1984–85	Southend Invicta	17	1	0	0	4
1985–86	Sheffield Eagles	1	0	0	0	0
	Total	162	7	6	4	38
Representative
Years	Team	Pld	T	G	FG	P
1973–76	New South Wales	3	0	0	0	0
1975–78	Australia	4	0	0	0	0
1973–74	NSW Country	2	0	0	0	0
1976	NSW City	1	0	0	0	0
- Source: As of 25 January 2024

John "Dallas" Donnelly (3 September 1954 – 22 February 1986) was an Australian professional rugby league footballer who played in the 1970s and 1980s. An Australian Kangaroos and New South Wales Blues representative, he played for Western Suburbs between 1975 and 1984 in the New South Wales Rugby League premiership.

== Playing career ==
Donnelly who was also commonly known by his nickname "Dallas", referring to his size, came from the New South Wales country town of Gunnedah, representing New South Wales and winning the award for country player of the year in 1973. He moved to Sydney's Western Suburbs club in 1975 and quickly gained a reputation that grew to almost cult status for his fiery on-field play as well as his off-field larrikin persona.

With Wests, Donnelly formed part of one of the most dominant forward packs in Australian Rugby League history under coach Roy Masters in the late 1970s, earning test selection for Australia in 1978 against New Zealand. By the 1980s however, he was plagued by increasing weight problems and constant suspensions, subsequently moving to English club Southend Invicta for the 1985–1986 seasons.

== Death ==
Donnelly returned to Australia in 1986 immediately after his season in England, where he took on a position as captain/coach of the Byron Bay Red Devils in Group 18 of the Country Rugby League. However, Donnelly, who had epilepsy throughout his career, drowned after having a seizure while surfing at Byron Bay before the season began and died at the age of 31.

== Accolades ==
Donnelly was awarded life membership of the Western Suburbs Magpies after his ten-season career with the club. Former Wests coach and player Ron Watson said of Donnelly, "I've seen a lot of players come through this club. I've never known anyone as popular as Dallas." Writer Alan Whiticker described Donnelly's career as being "central to the heart of the Wests club."

In 2004, Donnelly was named at prop in the Western Suburbs Magpies Team of the Century.
