= Harry Courtney (rugby league) =

Australian rugby league footballer (1908-1936)

Personal information
- Full name: Harold William Herbert Courtney
- Born: 11 October 1908; Lakemba, New South Wales, Australia
- Died: 6 December 1936 (aged 28); Randwick, New South Wales, Australia

Playing information
- Position: Second-row
Club
Years	Team	Pld	T	G	FG	P
1934	St. George	4	0	0	0	0
1935	Canterbury-Bankstown	5	0	0	0	0
	Total	9	0	0	0	0
- Father: Tedda Courtney
- Relatives: Ed Courtney Jr. (brother)

Harold William Herbert 'Harry' Courtney (1908-1936) was an Australian rugby league footballer who played in the 1930s.

A son of the rugby league legend Tedda Courtney and brother of Ed Courtney Jr., Harry played two years of first grade rugby league before his premature death. He joined the St. George club for one season before joining Canterbury-Bankstown to be coached by his famous father in 1935.

Courtney died on 6 December 1936 at Randwick, New South Wales.
