= Scott Gale (rugby league) =

Australian rugby league footballer (1965–2004)

Personal information
- Full name: Scott Owen Charles Gale
- Born: 10 February 1965 Sydney, New South Wales, Australia
- Died: 22 March 2004 (aged 39) Sydney, New South Wales, Australia

Playing information
- Position: Halfback, Centre, Five-eighth
Club
Years	Team	Pld	T	G	FG	P
1983	Western Suburbs	16	5	0	0	20
1984	Eastern Suburbs	19	2	0	0	8
1985–88	Balmain	99	35	0	3	143
1989–90	North Sydney	26	3	1	1	15
1991–92	Canberra Raiders	20	3	1	0	14
1987–93	Hull FC	30	10	0	0	40
	Total	210	58	2	4	240
- Source: As of 10 April 2019

Scott Gale (1965-2004) was an Australian professional rugby league footballer who played in the 1980s and 1990s. Nicknamed "Mr Midnight" he played for the Western Suburbs, Eastern Suburbs, Balmain, North Sydney and the Canberra Raiders in the New South Wales Rugby League (NSWRL) competition and Hull FC in England. His sister Tarsha Gale was the first captain of NSW in Women's Rugby League.

== Background ==
Gale was born in Sydney, New South Wales, Australia and was the son of 1958 Commonwealth Games sprinter Terry Gale. His brother Brett played for Western Suburbs, Eastern Suburbs and North Sydney.

== Playing career ==
Gale made his first-grade debut for Western Suburbs against Eastern Suburbs in Round 1, 1983 at the Sydney Sports Ground, scoring a try in a 29–6 loss. Gale would go on to play 16 games for Wests as the club finished last on the table, claiming the wooden spoon.

The following season in 1984, Gale joined Eastern Suburbs and played a total of 19 games in his one and only season there as the club finished second-last on the table. Gale led the Roosters to the final of the National Panasonic Cup in 1984, a midweek competition played over four quarters. The matches were played at night which was at that stage, a novelty in the game.

In 1985, Gale joined Balmain and became a regular starter in the team, usually playing at halfback, as the club became a constant finals presence. During this time with Balmain he led them to three National Panasonic Cup finals, winning in 1985 and 1987. Gale was named man of the match for his performance in the 1985 final.

In 1988, Gale switched to the centres as Balmain reached the grand final against Canterbury-Bankstown that season. Gale played from the bench in the 1988 NSWRL grand final as Canterbury won 24–12. In 1989, Gale joined North Sydney, spending two unsuccessful seasons at the club, before switching to the Canberra Raiders.

In his first year at Canberra, Gale played 12 games as the club reached the 1991 NSWRL grand final against the Penrith Panthers. Gale played from the bench as Canberra went into half-time with a 12–6 lead. Late in the second half, and with the Raiders trailing and desperate to regain possession of the ball, Gale attempted a short goal-line drop-out. However, the ball was quickly pounced upon by Penrith forward Mark Geyer who passed the ball to his captain Royce Simmons, who scored the match-winning try.

Gale played on in 1992 but only managed a further eight appearances before leaving Canberra. Gale then returned to England to play for Hull F.C. in 1993, with whom he had played in the late 1980s during the off-season. Gale retired at the end of the 1993 season.

== Death ==
After his playing career finished, Gale was later diagnosed with Motor Neurone Disease. He died on 22 March 2004.

== Honours ==
Australian Schoolboys 1982

Sydney Roosters/Eastern Suburbs

- National Panasonic Cup: 1984 National Panasonic Cup - Runner Up

Balmain Tigers

- NRL Grand Final: 1988 Grand Final - Runner Up
- National Panasonic Cup: 1985 National Panasonic Cup - Champion, 1986 National Panasonic Cup - Runner Up, 1987 National Panasonic Cup - Champion.

Canberra Raiders

- NRL Grand Final: 1991 Grand Final - Runner Up

Individual

- 1985, National Panasonic Cup Final - Man of the Match. National Panasonic Cup - Player of the Series
