= Brett Gale =

Australian rugby league footballer

Personal information
- Full name: Brett Terence Gale
- Born: 12 December 1963 (age 62)

Playing information
- Position: Second-row, Centre
Club
Years	Team	Pld	T	G	FG	P
1982–83	Western Suburbs	22	0	0	0	0
1984	Eastern Suburbs	4	0	0	0	0
1985–88	Western Suburbs	38	5	0	0	20
1989	North Sydney	2	0	0	0	0
	Total	66	5	0	0	20
- Source: As of 30 December 2022
- Relatives: Scott Gale (brother)

Brett Gale is an Australian former professional rugby league footballer who played in the 1980s. He played for Western Suburbs, Eastern Suburbs and North Sydney in the NSWRL competition.

== Background ==
Gale is the older brother of the late Scott Gale

== Playing career ==
Gale made his first grade debut in round 10 of the 1982 NSWRL season against Parramatta at Lidcombe Oval. Gale played from the bench as Wests defeated the defending premiers 19-7. Gale played another season with Western Suburbs in 1983 where they finished with the Wooden Spoon before transferring to Eastern Suburbs. Gale was limited to only four appearances with Easts as they finished second last on the table. Gale then transferred back to Western Suburbs with the club continuing to struggle on the field claiming the wooden spoon in 1987 and 1988. In 1989, Gale signed for North Sydney but only made two appearances for the club, the last being against Parramatta where they won 34-18 at North Sydney Oval in round 5 of the competition.

== Personal life ==
Following retirement from rugby league, Gale became a police officer with the NSW Police Force. In 2006, Gale was charged for robbing a Brisbane pub and later jailed for four years over the incident. In 2010, Gale was ordered to stand trial over another pub which was robbed in Nimbin.
