= Wayne Ellis (rugby league) =

Australian former rugby league coach

Coaching information
Club
Years	Team	Gms	W	D	L	W%
1994	Western Suburbs	7	2	0	5	29

Wayne Ellis is an Australian former rugby league coach.

Ellis was caretaker coach of Western Suburbs in 1994.

A former Western Suburbs Presidents Cup coach, Ellis was serving as the club's football manager when asked to take charge of the team for the final seven rounds of the 1994 NSWRL season, replacing Warren Ryan. His decision to play five-eighth Steve Georgallis as a lock against Newcastle was influential in securing one of his two wins as coach. He returned to his role as football manager the following season, under new coach Tommy Raudonikis.
