= Western Suburbs Magpies =

Australian rugby league club, based in Sydney, NSW

Club information
- Full name: Western Suburbs Magpies
- Nickname(s): The Fibros, The Cherry Pickers, Wests, Western Suburbs, The Magpies
- Colours: White; Black
- Founded: 4 February 1908; 118 years ago (foundation club)
- Exited: formed joint venture in 2000 with Balmain Tigers

Former details
- Coach: Tyrone McCarthy
- Competition: NSW Cup
- 2025: 9th

Uniforms
Home colours

Records
- Premierships: 4 – 1930, 1934, 1948, 1952
- Runners-up: 8 – 1918, 1925, 1932, 1950, 1958, 1961, 1962, 1963
- Minor premierships: 5 – 1930, 1948, 1952, 1961, 1978
- NSW Cup: 3 (1936, 1961, 1981)
- Wooden spoons: 17* – 1909, 1910, 1912, 1913, 1916, 1933, 1940, 1942, 1953, 1955, 1971, 1983, 1984, 1987, 1988, 1998, 1999

The Western Suburbs Magpies (legal name: Western Suburbs District Rugby League Football Club Ltd) is an Australian rugby league football club based in the western suburbs of Sydney, New South Wales. Formed in 1908, Wests, as the club is commonly referred to, was one of the nine foundation clubs of the first New South Wales Rugby League competition in Australia. The club, as a sole entity, departed the top-flight competition in 1999 after forming a 50–50 joint venture with Balmain Tigers to form the Wests Tigers. The club currently fields sides in the NSW State Cup (Canterbury Cup), Ron Massey Cup (Opens), S.G. Ball Cup (Under 19's) and Harold Matthews Cup (Under 17's) competitions.

Campbelltown Stadium, which has a capacity of 18,000, is the club's home stadium.

== History ==
Chart of yearly table positions for Western Suburbs Magpies in First Grade Rugby League

The club was one of the foundation members of the Sydney rugby football league competition in 1908. Founded at a meeting on 4 February 1908 at Ashfield Town Hall, they won only one match the following season and are sometimes considered the League's first wooden spooners (the distinction is disputed with Cumberland, who are sometimes considered to have been awarded an extra bye due to missing the start of the competition). Though they spent long periods of time as also-rans, they did taste premiership success four times in the mid-20th century. They won their first premiership in 1930, beating St George 27–2. Four years later they defeated Eastern Suburbs to win their second title. For the 1944 NSWRFL season, Queensland 1910s representative player Henry Bolewski became coach the Western Suburbs club, replacing Alf Blair, who moved to South Sydney. Wests slightly improved on their performance from the previous season, finishing 5th (out of 8), but failing to make the finals, and Bolewski was replaced by club great, Frank McMillan.

Wests won a second pair of premierships, beating Balmain in 1948 and South Sydney 22–12 in 1952. Both times they defeated a club hunting its third title in a row.

=== 1960s ===
Apart from these occasions, the club was famous for three successive grand final matches in 1961, 1962 and 1963 against the St George Dragons in the midst of their 11-premiership run. The club boasted footballers such as halfback Arthur Summons, Harry 'Bomber' Wells, Kel O'Shea, Noel Kelly and Peter Dimond. The 1963 grand final was immortalised in a photograph which became known as 'The Gladiators' after St. George captain Norm Provan and Summons trudged off the field together.

=== 1970s ===
A final period of glory beckoned in the late 1970s where they spent a few years at the top or near-top of the table, yet failed to make a grand final. Coached by Roy Masters and boasting such players as fullback John Dorahy, half Tommy Raudonikis, five-eighth Graeme O'Grady, Gavin Miller, Ron Giteau, Les Boyd, prop John Donnelly and five-eighth Terry Lamb. However attractive offers from other clubs and then doubts about the club's viability led to years of exodus of talent. Wests did manage to win the 1977 Amco Cup.

=== 1980s ===
John Ribot, a winger for Wests, was the top try-scorer for the 1980 season. In 1983 the NSWRFL attempted to expel Wests from the competition, but a prolonged legal battle to keep their spot ensued, unlike the Newtown Jets who did not compete that year. Richard Conti appeared against New South Wales Rugby League bosses John Quayle and Colin Love in 1985, successfully advocating to keep the embattled club in the competition. He was later appointed the chairman of the NSWRL Judiciary.

Eventually, Wests relocated to Campbelltown in 1987. Ironically, this was where Newtown had unsuccessfully tried to move to four years earlier. The move to Campbelltown did not change the clubs fortunes immediately with Western Suburbs finishing last in 1987 and 1988. The 1980s proved to be a tough time for the club with Wests claiming four wooden spoons throughout the decade and finishing second last on two occasions.

=== 1990s ===
Wests began a rebuilding process in the late 1980s and early 1990s. Laurie Freier started the 1988 Winfield Cup season as the club's coach but was replaced during the season by John Bailey.

The club made the semi-finals in 1991 and 1992 under coach Warren Ryan. Wests were NSWRL Club Champions in 1991 when all three grades made the semi-finals. The team also made it to the pre-season Challenge Cup final in 1993 but was beaten by a star-studded Canberra side.

The club then slipped down the ladder and the coaching reins were handed over to caretaker Wayne Ellis. The decision to appoint Tommy Raudonikis as coach for the start of the 1995 season sent a shot of adrenaline into the club. Raudonikis took the Magpies to the finals in 1996. However the club could not compete in the player market in 1997 thanks to the Super League war which saw players' contracts soar sky high to unsustainable levels.

In 1998 and 1999, a Magpie team filled with many unknown players struggled to be competitive and twice received the wooden spoon. With the club struggling on-field and trying to compete financially against clubs with News Limited funding, the writing was on the wall.

=== Joint venture ===
The well documented Super League War in 1997 between Super League (News Ltd) and the Australian Rugby League (ARL) resulted in a compromise that by the year 2000, the National Rugby League (NRL) competition would be contested by only 14 teams. With Western Suburbs struggling on field in the NRL competition, it was decided by the club in the middle of 1999 that to survive the cull they would be required to merge their senior team with another club's team. After initial talks with the Canterbury-Bankstown Bulldogs failed an agreement was reached with the Balmain Tigers on 27 July 1999. The Wests Tigers first competed in the 2000 competition. The club also merged its playing colours from the two joint venture partners.

=== Major sponsors ===
- Allied Express
- Victa (1978–1982)
- IPEC Couriers (1984–1985)
- Masterton Homes (1986–1992)
- Goldstar / LG Electronics (1995–1997)
- Signature Security Systems (1998–1999)
- Club Hotels (2000)
- Save Home Loans (2005)
- Wests Ashfield Leagues (2006–2015)

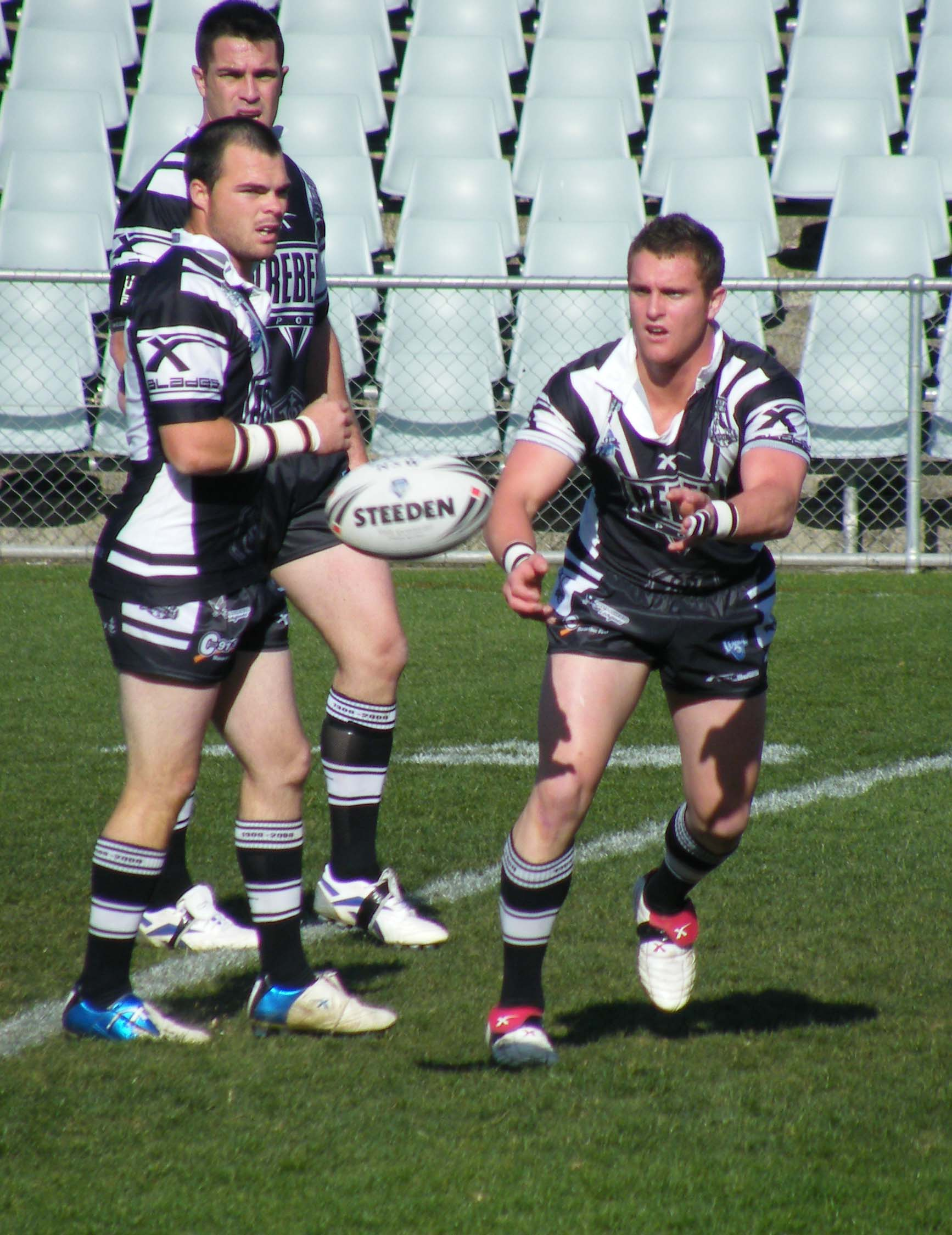
Wests in action in 2008

Wests Ashfield Leagues have also been key sponsors & supporters of the club since they were established.

- Rebel Sport (Centenary Partner and 2008 Major Sponsor)
- Allied Express (2015)

== Current days ==
The Western Suburbs Magpies home matches are played at Lidcombe Oval, Lidcombe and their training facilities are near by.

In 2000 the Western Suburbs Magpies Under 20s team were runners up to the Canterbury Bankstown Bulldogs, captained by Mitch Zammit and Luke Duffy. The Western Suburbs Magpies last title was won in 2002 when the Western Suburbs Magpies captained by Liam Fulton won the New South Wales Rugby League Under 18's competition.

From 2000 to 2012, the Western Suburbs Magpies fielded teams in the NSWRL First Grade competition now known as the NSW Cup.

In 2006, the Wests Tigers on advice from Tim Sheens pushed the notion that the NRL side would be better served with a single NSW Cup side. Western Suburbs board opposed this decision and decided to continue fielding their own team. Wests Tigers then allocated all NRL contracted players to the Balmain Tigers (the Wests Magpies had six junior players in that group, as opposed to one from Balmain), citing the advantages of both the NRL and NSW Cup teams training together at Concord Oval. This continued from 2006 to 2007.

Magpies chairman Kevin Hammond was disappointed at the Wests Tigers decision and informed the Wests Tigers of that in 2008, if the Magpies did not receive a fair share of player allocation from the Wests Tigers, they would form a feeder partnership with rivals Canberra Raiders. The Wests Tigers capitulated.

The Western Suburbs Magpies made the semi-finals in 2008, 2009 and 2010. In 2012 funding was withheld from the Magpies by Wests Ashfield Leagues Club Directors (not unanimously) as they now supported Wests Tigers proposal for a single NSW Cup side, even though this was done simply because Balmain couldn't afford a side and Wests could.

This also went against the Magpies Football Club members wishes and they organised a Protest Rally through the streets of Campbelltown. Wests Ashfield Leagues Club under pressure reinstated funding late in the off season after the Magpies players had already signed on to play with other teams.

The Wests Tigers however decided to cease all support of the Magpies NSW Cup side while continuing support for Balmain Ryde Eastwood Tigers. The Magpies failed to win a game in 2012 while Balmain Ryde Eastwood Tigers made it to the Grand Final where they were defeated by the Newtown Jets.

The Magpies dropped back to the third tier Ron Massey Cup in 2013, with members voting to field a separate NSW Cup team in 2014, although this did not eventuate. In 2015, The Magpies added a team in the Sydney Shield competition to act as a feeder for their Ron Massey Cup campaign. In 2016, Western Suburbs made the preliminary final match against St Mary's in The Ron Massey Cup but lost the match in a close tussle. 2017 proved to be a bad year for Wests as The Ron Massey Cup side finished with the wooden spoon and The Sydney Shield side finished second last.

On 5 June 2017, it was announced that Western Suburbs had placed a bid to be included into the Intrust Super Premiership season for 2018. The re-entry to the Intrust Super Premiership ended the clubs five-year hiatus from the top level NSWRL competition that it had participated continuously in from 1908 to 2012. For its return the team was coached by former Western Suburbs first grade player Brett Hodgson. In 2018, Wests enjoyed a solid return to the Intrust Super Premiership NSW after finishing in 5th place on the table. In week 1 of the finals, Wests were defeated by the Wyong Roos 18–14 in the elimination final thus ending their season.

At the end of the 2019 Canterbury Cup NSW season, Western Suburbs missed out on the finals after finishing in 10th place. Western Suburbs had a difficult year during the 2022 NSW Cup finishing 11th on the table just one spot above wooden spooners Blacktown Workers. Western Suburbs had a tough year in the 2024 NSW Cup finishing last and claiming the wooden spoon. Wests only managed to win six games for the entire campaign. In the 2025 NSW Cup season, Western Suburbs improved on the field finishing 9th on the table.

== Home grounds ==
St Luke's Park was the home ground of the Western Suburbs club in 1910 and 1911. They started playing their matches at Pratten Park in Ashfield in 1912, but after pressure from local residents there the council refused the club permission to use that ground, forcing them to return to St. Luke's Oval from 1915 to 1919. The Magpies have played at three home grounds since foundation. They returned to Pratten Park in 1920, remaining there until 1966, the club then played at Pratten Park sporadically over the next two decades playing games there in 1971, 1972, 1973, 1977 and 1985. The final ever first grade game to be played at Pratten Park was on 18 August 1985 against Penrith, Penrith won the match by 42–16. They then moved to Lidcombe Oval in 1967. This was due to Ashfield council not allowing the club to play matches on a Sunday (as this was the church day). In 1987, they moved to Campbelltown's Orana Park (located in adjacent Leumeah), which, after a $25 million renovation, is now called Campbelltown Stadium which is now one of the home grounds of the Wests Tigers. The Magpies' lower grade sides play most home games at Campbelltown Stadium, with the occasional game moved to Lidcombe Oval.

== Western Suburbs Magpies Leagues Club ==
While no leagues club is called the "Western Suburbs Magpies Leagues Club", the businesses "Western Suburbs District Rugby League Football Club Ltd" is a fully controlled entity of Wests Ashfield Leagues Club. The Leagues club was formed in the 1950s and is now one of the leading community Clubs in Sydney.

== Board of directors ==
The current board of directors of the Wests Magpies (Western Suburbs District Rugby League Football Club)

- Old salty Dennis Burgess - Chairman WAL appointed
- Stephen Montgomery WAL Appointed
- Tony Andreacchio – WAL Appointed
- Rick Wayde - WAL Appointed
- Shannon Cavanagh – FC Member Elected
- Allan Fallah – FC Member Elected
- Tony Westlake – FC Member Elected

The board of directors comprises 4 members appointed by Wests Ashfield Leagues Club, and 3 members elected by the members of the football club

== District Junior competition ==
The Western Suburbs District Junior Rugby League (WSDJRL) was a completely separate entity to the Western Suburbs Magpies DRLFC. They were known as the "Junior Magpies", and administered the junior rugby league on behalf of the Western Suburbs Magpies and the Wests Tigers joint venture. It consisted of a network of affiliated junior rugby league clubs throughout the greater Campbelltown and Liverpool areas of southwestern Sydney. As of 2016 the following clubs were involved in the WSDJRL;

- All Saints JRLFC
- All Stars Glenquarie (formally Macquarie Fields Hawks)
- Campbelltown City Kangaroos JRLFC
- Campbelltown Collegians JRLFC
- Campbelltown Warriors JRLFC
- Eaglevale St Andrews JRLFC
- East Campbelltown Eagles JRLFC
- Hinchinbrook Hornets JRLFC
- Ingleburn RSL Tigers JRLFC
- Liverpool Catholic Club Raiders JRLFC
- Macarthur Saints JRLFC (ex-St Thomas More JRLFC)
- Minto Cobras JRLFC
- Valley United Vikings JRLFC (formally known as East Valley United and also Green Valley United)

The league was placed into administration in January 2019, with the NSWRL stepping in to manage the competition.

The following clubs also competed in the WSDJRL, but have now folded:

- Airds Colts JRLFC
- Ashcroft JRLFC
- Claymore Panthers JRLFC
- Dayments Dolphins JRLFC
- Heckenberg JRLFC
- Ingleburn Bulldogs JRLFC
- Leumeah Wolves JRLFC
- Liverpool City JRLFC
- Liverpool Titans JRLFC
- Liverpool RSL JRLFC
- Macquarie Cobras JRLFC
- Warwick Farm JRLFC
- Woodlands JRLFC
- Sadlier Bulldogs JRLFC

The WSDJRL has produced many ex and current Wests Tigers players including Brett Hodgson (Eagle Vale-St Andrews & Ingleburn RSL), Dean Collis (Campbelltown Warriors), Bryce Gibbs (All Saints Liverpool), Shannon Gallant (All Saints Liverpool & Campbelltown City) Chris Lawrence (Eagle Vale), and Shannon McDonnell (All Saints Liverpool). David Noaofaluma (Campbelltown Warriors, Campbelltown Collegians) James Tedesco (Eagle Vale St. Andrews) also Camden Rams (group 6, CRL) Other notable NRL players who grew up playing junior rugby league in the WSDJRL are Anthony Minichiello (East Valley United), Mark Minichiello (Liverpool Catholic Club) Frank Pritchard (Campbelltown City)Eric Grothe, Jr. (Eagle Vale), Ryan Hoffman (Campbelltown Collegians), Ben Roberts (Narellan Jets), Sauaso Sue (Macquarie Field Hawks), Israel Folau, Jarryd Hayne, Krisnan Inu, Michael Lett (Ingleburn RSL), Gray Viane, John Skandalis, Ken McGuinness, Kevin McGuinness, Tim Lafai and Mickey & Lopini Paea (all Minto Cobras).

The WSDJRL took over its current boundaries from the CRL Group 6 Northern Junior League and parts of the Parramatta DJRL (i.e. Liverpool) in 1987. Moving to be based in South West Sydney (Specifically the MacArthur Region and the Liverpool local government area), they were forced to move out of their traditional territory around the Ashfield and Lidcombe areas of inner western Sydney to be able to then survive in the NSWRL. The old WSDJRL area was absorbed by the Balmain DJRL. Some clubs were also absorbed into the Bulldogs (Canterbury) DJRL. Clubs that used to play in the WSDJRL include;

- Ashfield Colts (now folded) – Also known as the Ashfield Kings
- Burwood United (now merged with Concord in Balmain DJRL)
- Concord United (now merged with Burwood in Balmain DJRL)
- Benedicts Auburn (now Trinity College, Auburn)
- Enfield Federals (When the Magpies first went to Campbelltown they became part of Canterbury, then they folded for a few years before coming in under the Balmain DJRL) (produced Hazem El Masri, Robbie Farah, Scott Gale, Brett Clark, Wayne Smith, Ken Hey, Jim Serdaris, Denis Pittard, Tim Pickup and Brett Gale Leo Epifania)
- Five Dock JRLFC (now in Balmain DJRL)
- Lidcombe Bulls (folded in mid-1980s)
- Berala Bears (now in Bulldogs DJRL)
- Croydon Park (folded in mid-1980s)
- Holman JRLFC (Named after Keith Holman, based at Henley Park, Enfield. Colours were yellow with a blue shoulder saddle, and the emblem was oval shaped with a kangaroo, a football, a kiwi, a rooster & a lion; signifying that Keith played for Australia against New Zealand, France & England. Folded in mid-1980s)
- Homebush – unsure when folded
- Royal Sheaf Hotel (Burwood, folded in late 1980s)
- Oriental Shamrocks (folded in 1960s)
- Granville Diggers – folded in mid 80s
- De La Salle – Ashfield – again, unsure of when they folded
- Christian Brothers Burwood
- Auburn United – unsure when folded
- Strathfield – unsure when folded

The first year of the WSDJRL was 1910 and the final standings were: Parramatta Iona 16, Parramatta District 14, Campsie Triers 11, Granville Royals 11, Enfield Mercantile 9, Ashfield Surryville 7, Auburn Park 2. Since the NSWRL had promised 2 sets of medals the teams then split into 2 grades, Campsie Triers beating Granville Royals in a playoff to go onto the A section and the other 4 teams in the B Finals. Parramatta District won the A Grade and Granville Royals the B Grade. Parramatta District went into the NSWRL 3rd Grade competition in 1911 and Granville Royals joined them in 1912. Campsie Triers and Enfield Mercantile were formed by a split in the Enfield Federals club that had won the B Grade of the WSJRU competition in 1909, in its first year as a club. Val Howell, Frank Howell, S Gagan, G Gagan, A Tanner and Thompson joined Campsie while Lewis, H McCoy, D Nicholls, Prentice and Smythe joined Mercantile. They were together as the Feds in 1911 and won both that season and again in 1912, so without the split they might have won titles in each of their first 4 seasons.

== Notable players ==
=== Hall of Fame ===
On Friday 30 May 2008 the centenary of the Western Suburbs Magpies was celebrated with a ball in the Grand Harbour Ballroom at Sydney's Star City Casino. Six inaugural members were also inducted into the Western Suburbs Magpies Hall of Fame:

- Keith Holman
- Jim Abercrombie
- Peter Dimond
- Arthur Summons
- Tommy Raudonikis
- Noel Kelly

2010 Inductees

- Dick Vest
- Bill Keato
- Trevor Cogger

1997 MIA players

- Wayne Shields

2012 Inductees

- Clarrie Prentice
- Frank Stanmore
- Wayne Smith

=== Team of the Century ===
This painting of the Western Suburbs Magpies Team of the Century hangs in Wests Ashfield Leagues Club.

In 2004 the club named its Team of the Century:

No.

Position
Player

1 Frank McMillan – FB 2 Peter Dimond – WG 3 Harry Wells – CE 4 Cliff Pearce – CE 5 Alan Ridley – WG 6 Vic Hey – FE 7 Keith Holman – HB 8 John Donnelly – PR 9 Noel Kelly – HK

No.

Position
Player

10 Ed "Tedda" Courtney – PR 11 Kel O'Shea – SR 12 Arthur Clues – SR 13 Les Boyd – LK 14 Tommy Raudonikis – positions 15 John Dorahy – positions 16 Neville Charlton – positions 17 Bill Carson – positions Roy Masters – positions

=== International Representatives ===
The following Western Suburbs Magpies players have represented their countries in international competition.

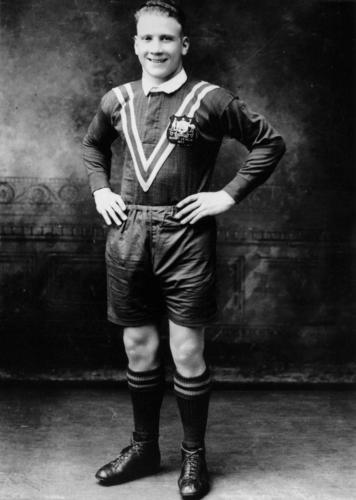
Vic Hey Australian Rep 1933–38

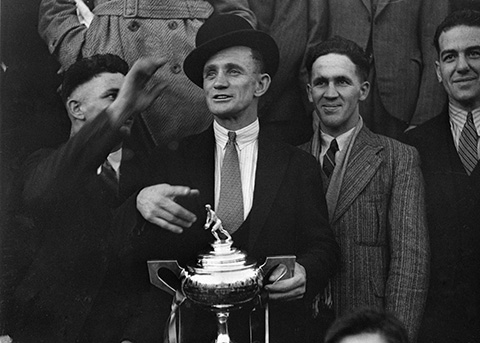
Glory Days: Frank McMillan 1934 premiership winning captain, with (right) Alan Brady & Charlie Cornwell

Australia

- Frank McMillan
- Bill Brogan
- Alan Ridley
- Vic Hey
- Dick Vest
- Keith Holman
- Arthur Summons
- Peter Dimond
- Don Parish
- Harry Wells
- Kel O'Shea
- Noel Kelly
- John Ribot
- Terry Lamb
- Paul Langmack
- David Gillespie
- Tommy Raudonikis
- Jim Serdaris
- Les Boyd
- John Donnelly

New Zealand

- Mark Horo
- Stephen Kearney
- Brendon Tuuta

England

- Harvey Howard
- Lee Crooks
- Garry Schofield
- Ellery Hanley

(Republic of Ireland) Ireland

- Shayne McMenemy

Fiji

- Netane Masima

Papua New Guinea

- David Buko

== Magpies Test Captains ==
- Herb Gilbert – 1920
- Frank McMillan – 1933 to 1934
- Col Maxwell – 1948 to 1949
- Arthur Summons – 1963 to 1964
- Tommy Raudonikis – 1973

== Coaching register ==
No.	Name	Years	G	W	L	D	%	Premierships	Runners-up	Minor Premierships	Wooden spoons
1	Tedda Courtney	1923						—	—	—	—
2	Albert Johnston	1924	8	4	4	0	50%	—	—	—	—
3	Clarrie Prentice	1927	18	10	8	0	56%	—	—	—	—
4	Chris McKivat	1928	12	4	8	1	33%	—	—	—	—
5	Jim Craig	1929–1930, 1932, 1939	66	40	22	4	61%	1930	1932	1930	—
6	Frank McMillan	1931, 1934, 1936, 1945	61	38	21	2	62%	1934	—	—	—
7	William Brogan	1933	14	4	9	1	29%	—	—	—	1933
8	Jerry Brien	1937	8	3	5	0	38%	—	—	—	—
9	Cec Fifield	1938	14	4	9	1	29%	—	—	—	—
10	Max Gray	1940	14	3	11	0	21%	—	—	—	1940
11	Les Mead	1941	14	6	8	0	43%	—	—	—	—
12	Albert McGuinness	1942	14	2	12	0	14%	—	—	—	1942
13	Alf Blair	1943	14	3	11	0	21%	—	—	—	—
14	Henry Bolewski	1944	7	1	5	1	14%	—	—	—	—
15	Paddy Bugden	1944	7	3	3	1	43%	—	—	—	—
16	Jack Walsh	1946, 1956–1957	53	26	25	2	49%	—	—	—	—
17	Frank Burge	1947	20	12	8	0	60%	—	—	—	—
18	Jeff Smith	1948, 1950–1951	59	38	19	2	64%	1948	1950	1948	—
19	Col Maxwell	1949	19	12	7	0	63%	—	—	—	—
20	Tom McMahon	1952	20	15	4	1	75%	1952	—	1952	—
21	Peter McLean	1953	18	5	13	0	28%	—	—	—	1953
22	Keith Holman	1954–1955, 1977	58	16	41	1	28%	—	—	—	1955
23	Vic Hey	1958–1959	40	26	13	1	65%	—	1958	—	—
24	Dudley Beger	1960	22	13	9	0	59%	—	—	—	—
25	Jack Fitzgerald	1961–1964	80	53	25	2	66%	—	1961, 1962, 1963	1961	—
26	Ken Kearney	1965	18	6	12	0	33%	—	—	—	—
27	Noel Kelly	1966–1969	85	43	40	2	51%	—	—	—	—
28	Ron Watson	1970–1971	44	10	33	1	23%	—	—	—	1971
29	Don Parish	1972–1976	113	50	57	6	44%	—	—	—	—
30	Tommy Raudonikis	1976, 1995–1999	116	39	76	1	34%	—	—	—	1998, 1999
31	Roy Masters	1978–1981	94	56	36	2	60%	—	—	1978	—
32	Terry Fearnley	1982	27	16	11	0	59%	—	—	—	—
33	Len Stacker	1983	26	5	19	2	19%	—	—	—	1983
34	Ken Gentle	1984–1985	48	6	40	2	13%	—	—	—	1984
35	Steve Ghosn	1986–1987	48	13	32	3	27%	—	—	—	1987
36	Laurie Freier	1988	16	2	13	1	13%	—	—	—	—
37	John Bailey	1988–1990	50	15	33	2	30%	—	—	—	1988,
38	Warren Ryan	1991–1994	84	37	43	3	44%	—	—	—	—
39	Wayne Ellis	1994	7	2	5	0	29%	—	—	—	—

== Records ==
=== Club honours ===
- Premierships: 4 – 1930 beat St George; 1934 beat Easts; 1948 beat Balmain; 1952 beat South Sydney
- Runners Up: 8 – 1918; 1925; 1932; 1950; 1958; 1961; 1962; 1963
- Minor Premierships: 6 – 1930; 1934; 1948; 1952; 1961; 1978
- Amco Cup: 1 – 1977
- City Cup: 2 – 1918; 1919

==== Youth/Pre-season honours ====
- NSWRL Club Championships: 4 – 1948; 1960; 1961; 1991
- State Cup / Jersey Flegg U20s: 1 – 1965
- Ampol Cup: 1 – 1963
- NSWRL Reserve Grade: 3 (1936, 1961, 1981)
- NSWRL Third Grade: 7 (1936, 1938, 1939, 1944, 1958, 1961, 1967)
- Under 23 Premiership: 1 (1977)
- President's Cup: 5 (1925, 1945, 1947, 1958, 1992)
- Flegg Memorial Trophy: 2 (1961, 1981)
- NSWRL SG Ball U18's: 2 (1971, 2002)

Largest crowd:

- Lidcombe Oval: 21,015 vs Parramatta (30 July 1978)
- Campbelltown Sports Ground: 17,286 vs St George (2 August 1991)
- Pratten Park: 12,407 vs St George (15 June 1964)

Biggest defeat: 67–0 vs South Sydney (Agricultural Showground, 23 July 1910)

Biggest win: 62–5 vs Balmain (Lidcombe Oval, 31 March 1974)

=== Individual ===
Most First Grade Games

1. 201 – Tommy Raudonikis (1969–1979)
2. 200 – Keith Holman (1949–1961)
3. 161 – Tedda Courtney (1909, 1911–1924)
4. 161 – Wayne Smith (1976–1984)
5. 160 – Trevor Cogger (1981–1991)
6. 155 – Peter Dimond (1958–1967)
7. 148 – John Donnelly (1975–1984)
8. 148 – Steve Georgallis (1993–1999)
9. 144 – Darren Willis (1992–1998)
10. 143 – Nev Charlton (1954-1961)
11. 141 – Frank McMillan (1921–1924, 1926–1935)

Most Tries in a Match: Alan Ridley, 6 vs Newtown, Pratten Park, 11 July 1936

Most Tries in a Season: Alan Ridley, 18 in 1932 and Paul Smith, 18 in 1994

Most 1st Grade Tries For Club: Peter Dimond, 83

Most Tries For Club (All grades): Trevor Cogger, 88

Most Goals in a Match: Les Mead, 12 v Canterbury, Pratten Park, 31 August 1935

Most Points in a Match: Les Mead, 27 (1 try, 12 goals) v Canterbury, Pratten Park, 31 August 1935

Most Points in a Season: Peter Rowles, 215 (8 tries, 94 goals, 3 field goals) in 1978

Most Points for Club: Bill Keato, 776 (6 tries, 379 goals)

== All Time 1st Grade Numbered Players List ==
Below is a list of all players that played for the Western Suburbs Magpies in the NSWRL, ARL and NRL First Grade competitions from 1908 to 1999.

- 1908
- 1 Jim Abercrombie
- 2 C Blake
- 3 A Brown
- 4 George Duffin
- 5 B Duggan
- 6 Bill Elliott
- 7 Percy Franks
- 8 L Gormley
- 9 Ray Gormley
- 10 Ted Mead
- 11 T Mount
- 12 Tom Phelan
- 13 Jim Stack
- 14 Les Byewell
- 15 R Ellis
- 16 Charles Luhr
- 17 T Watkins
- 18 E Ellis
- 19 Boyleau
- 20 Claude McFayden
- 21 N Booth
- 22 Charlie Elliott
- 23 J Frost
- 24 J Hodgson
- 25 S Gilbert
- 26 Holloway
- 27 J Herrington
- 1909
- 28 A Abbott
- 29 Harry Bloomfield
- 30 F Casey
- 31 Albert Halling
- 32 R Meredith
- 33 J Spears
- 34 T Wallis
- 35 H Boyle
- 36 Edward Bellamy
- 37 Albert Burdus
- 38 Tedda Courtney
- 39 S Duncan
- 40 Bill Medcalf
- 41 V Sands
- 42 C Blake
- 43 E Gulliver
- 44 E Fletcher
- 45 G Shaw
- 46 W Wenban
- 47 C Clifford
- 48 P Scotten
- 49 R McCallum
- 50 Harold R. Thompson
- 51 H Kemp
- 52 W Moore
- 53 William Thrussell
- 54 W Wright
- 1910
- 55 W Barclay
- 56 Percy Bolt
- 57 T Doyle
- 58 J Feeney
- 59 V Jarvis
- 60 E Mantle
- 61 H.G. Naylor
- 62 Walter Palmer
- 63 E Willings
- 64 Grinstead
- 65 Owens
- 66 Sam Perry
- 67 Keen
- 68 James
- 69 Percy Briscoe
- 70 Chipperfield
- 71 J Ogilvie
- 72 Horace Alderson
- 73 Johns
- 74 J Slingsby
- 75 D McDonald
- 76 G Patterson
- 77 Baldock
- 78 Tom Dowswell
- 79 Healy
- 80 McEvoy
- 81 Ryan
- 1911
- 82 George Duffin
- 83 Herb Gilbert
- 84 Rangi Joass
- 85 W Mueller
- 86 A Munnery
- 87 P.J. Thompson
- 88 Jack Tully
- 89 S.B. Wall
- 90 A Gillett
- 91 Alf Joass
- 92 Dick Moroney
- 93 V West
- 94 Oliver Griffin
- 95 A Paterson
- 96 A Stack
- 1912
- 97 Tom Alpen
- 98 Harold Bissett
- 99 S Dennis
- 100 E.S Williams
- 101 Arthur Conlin
- 102 G Holt
- 103 George Alderson
- 104 Thackeray
- 105 Stuart
- 106 B Webster
- 107 Ray Steward
- 108 Bertram Alderson
- 109 W Gander
- 110 G Easterbrook
- 111 Hearn
- 112 C Lucky
- 113 Cecil Foord
- 114 Charles Rothwell
- 1913
- 115 S Carr
- 116 W Foord
- 117 Eddie Griffiths
- 118 J Lindsay
- 119 Johnno Stuntz
- 120 George Gagen
- 121 V Masters
- 122 Harry Clarke
- 123 L West
- 124 Henry McIllmurray
- 125 A Rose
- 126 Fred Lane
- 127 Maxworthy
- 128 W Warby
- 129 J Freeman
- 130 H Sly
- 131 W Weigan
- 132 Harrington
- 1914
- 133 W Anderton
- 134 Charlie Collier
- 135 Jack Nicholson
- 136 R Tremain
- 137 Clarrie Tye
- 138 E Mason
- 139 D Watson
- 140 N Williams
- 141 R Upton
- 142 F Holt
- 143 Dick Vest
- 1915
- 144 Harold Leddy
- 145 Tom McCauley
- 146 A Mitchell
- 147 Archie Prentice
- 148 Clarrie Prentice
- 149 W.L. Simpson
- 150 A Smith
- 151 Athol White
- 152 Billy Connelly
- 153 Alf Bossi
- 154 G Hastle
- 155 G Viles
- 156 D Woodward
- 1916
- 157 A McPherson
- 158 Roy Norman
- 159 A Carroll
- 160 H Lee
- 161 S Langley
- 162 F Large
- 163 R Swanson
- 164 E Johnson
- 1917
- 165 P Burns
- 166 George Potter
- 167 Tony Redmond
- 168 Ted Boland
- 169 Charles Ashworth
- 170 Harold Holmes
- 171 Roy Bossi
- 172 S.D. Matthews
- 173 Joe Reidy
- 1918
- 174 Wally Collins
- 175 Albert Johnston
- 176 Walter Palmer
- 1919
- 177 George McGowan
- 178 W Matthews
- 179 Patrick McCue
- 180 Bill Lucas
- 181 Roy Farnsworth
- 182 Gordon Stettler
- 1920
- 183 Viv Farnsworth
- 184 Ward Prentice
- 185 Lyall Wall
- 186 Harry Tancred
- 187 Frank 'Dargins' Gray
- 188 G Bossi
- 1921
- 189 Edward Burnicle
- 190 Frank McMillan
- 191 Eric Doig
- 192 R Howell
- 193 J Plumb
- 194 E Stapleton
- 195 Frank Burridge
- 196 J Ryan
- 197 R Walker
- 1922
- 198 Tedda Brooks
- 199 H Haylock
- 200 Louis Yanz
- 201 F Young
- 202 J Drew
- 203 Fred Yanz Sr.
- 204 Wade Lane
- 205 R Dark
- 206 Neil Matterson
- 207 J Walker
- 208 Cyril Bellamy
- 209 Arthur Mendel
- 1923
- 210 Cec Fifield
- 211 W McCabe
- 212 Bob Lindfield
- 213 Bill Carpenter
- 214 Jerry Brien
- 1924
- 215 Joe Mansted
- 216 F Elliott
- 217 Ed Courtney Jr.
- 218 Frank Matterson
- 219 Frank McCauley
- 220 R Ives
- 1925
- 221 George Daisley
- 222 Gilbert C
- 1926
- 223 Flint C
- 224 Jim Parsons
- 225 Jack Redmond
- 226 C Stapleton
- 227 Frank Spillane
- 228 Jack Holmes
- 229 G Peterson
- 230 Harry Owen
- 231 Roy Liston
- 232 R Wheldon
- 233 Cecil Rhodes
- 234 Dave Hey
- 1927
- 235 Les Dolan
- 236 Les Hayes
- 237 Ken Sherwood
- 238 G Cameron
- 239 F Bartley
- 240 W McPherson
- 241 George Mason
- 242 Harry Tisdale
- 243 Ray Morris
- 244 Tom Stanton
- 245 Jack Thompson
- 1928
- 246 Allan Adams
- 247 Leo Joyce
- 248 Walter Anderton
- 249 Jack Matterson
- 250 Jack Peterson
- 251 J McKee
- 252 Frank Boyd
- 253 Jack Kelly
- 254 H Miller
- 1929
- 255 Alan Brady
- 256 William Brogan
- 257 Jim Craig
- 258 N McNee
- 259 L Roberts
- 260 N Booth
- 261 Cliff Pearce
- 262 Vince Dwyer
- 1930
- 263 Norm Johnson
- 264 Les Mead
- 265 Charlie Cornwell
- 266 Harold Rigby
- 267 Jack Rosa
- 268 Vince Hughes
- 1931
- 269 Bert Green
- 270 Alan Ridley
- 271 Cec Anderton
- 272 Harry Cameron
- 273 Bill Ryan
- 274 Dick Davis
- 275 Charlie Wrench
- 276 Clyde Cant
- 1932
- 277 R McMillan
- 278 Jack McGlinn
- 279 Frank Sponberg
- 280 H Rankine
- 1933
- 281 Vic Hey
- 282 R Shepherd
- 283 Stan Tancred
- 284 Jack McDonell
- 285 Les Midson
- 286 W McLeod
- 287 Sid Elliott
- 288 Bill Howes
- 289 Alan Blake
- 290 S Palmer
- 291 Sen Black
- 292 Tom Magnus
- 293 Albert McGuinness
- 294 L Hancock
- 295 Cliff Deegan
- 296 M Smith
- 1934
- 297 Max Gray
- 298 Ray Hancock
- 299 Vince Sheehan
- 300 George Sherry
- 301 Ray Hines
- 302 Jack Hartwell Sr.
- 303 Alec McDonald
- 304 Jimmy Sharman
- 305 Lionel Frappell
- 306 Don Murray
- 1935
- 307 Ron Eaton
- 308 Jack Kingston
- 309 Gordon Pugh
- 310 Athol Smith
- 311 Vince Cleary
- 312 Bob Allison
- 313 Jack Spillane
- 314 Fred Comber
- 315 Billy Wheeler
- 316 H Hannan
- 317 Bill Purcell
- 318 R Waldon
- 1936
- 319 Ray Gillam
- 320 Mick Shields
- 321 Pat White
- 322 Jack Arnold
- 323 Stan Simpson
- 324 Edward Mewton
- 325 Andy Gleeson
- 326 Doug Wilson
- 1937
- 327 Don Gulliver
- 328 Herbert Haar
- 329 Jack Knox
- 330 E Murphy
- 331 Ken Lock
- 332 Jack Schuback
- 1938
- 333 Fred Baber
- 334 Lew Fisher
- 335 G Lucas
- 336 James Marks
- 337 E Martin
- 338 Colin Fewtrell
- 339 Jack Rubinson
- 340 Phil Cooper
- 341 Bill Keato
- 1939
- 342 Fred McKean
- 343 O Mitchell
- 344 Dave Colless
- 345 Ron Ackling
- 346 R Campbell
- 347 Ken Kelly
- 348 H Allen
- 349 J Tisdale
- 350 John Caffrey
- 351 Harry Martin
- 1940
- 352 Bruce Brown
- 353 A Patrick
- 354 Jack Whitehurst
- 355 Doug Rogers
- 356 Jack Farrell
- 357 J Grahame
- 358 R Ridley
- 1941
- 359 J Huxley
- 360 N Parkinson
- 361 Jim Rutherford
- 362 T Slattery
- 363 Bob Thompson
- 364 Eric Bennett
- 365 C O'Brien
- 366 C Sherry
- 1942
- 367 Harry Grew
- 368 L Hoshcke
- 369 Neville Spence
- 370 W Taylor
- 371 C Williams
- 372 R Hill
- 373 William Brown
- 374 Terry Edwards
- 375 R McLaurin
- 376 J Wilson
- 377 A Rice
- 378 R Thompson
- 379 J Fawkner
- 380 Billy Morris
- 381 J Hope
- 382 E Edwards
- 383 T Grew
- 384 L Rigby
- 385 J Beckett
- 1943
- 386 Begley J
- 387 Arthur Clues
- 388 S Eisenhuth
- 389 Dick Johnson
- 390 Bob Andrews
- 391 B Dawson
- 392 Alan Keato
- 393 R Fields
- 394 Jack Snare
- 395 K Ibbett
- 396 Fred Fayers
- 397 P McFarlane
- 398 Jack Russell
- 399 Ron Martin
- 1944
- 400 S Ball
- 401 H Fyvie
- 402 Jim Keefe
- 403 Don Milton
- 404 Cliff Peime
- 405 W Phillips
- 406 Alf Cardy
- 407 Neville Hogan
- 408 Fred Yanz Jr.
- 409 J Banner
- 410 A Seamer
- 411 Paddy Bugden
- 412 L Clancy
- 413 R Davidson
- 414 Robert Magill
- 1945
- 415 Frank Dodson
- 416 Jim Nicholson
- 417 Jim Seery
- 418 Jack Walsh
- 419 Col Maxwell
- 420 R Dreves
- 421 R Williams
- 1946
- 422 Tom Briggs
- 423 J Hickey
- 424 Bob Hobbs
- 425 Lindsay Rodda
- 426 S Cruise
- 427 Dick McKelvey
- 428 K Cleary
- 429 Pat Leal
- 1947
- 430 Trevor Eather
- 431 Kevein Hansen
- 432 John Lackey
- 433 Peter McLean
- 434 Mick Thornton
- 1948
- 435 Bernie Purcell
- 436 Frank Stanmore
- 437 Alan Hornery
- 438 Wally Tebbutt
- 439 Bill Horder
- 440 Keith Holman
- 441 Col Hudson
- 442 Don Worne
- 1949
- 443 Jack Woods
- 444 George Bain
- 445 Bill Rawlinson
- 446 Jack Fitzgerald
- 447 G Lovell
- 448 Jack Williams
- 449 Vic Williams
- 450 Bill Hilliard
- 451 Jack Wall
- 452 Jack Rawlinson
- 1950
- 453 Bill Randall
- 454 Dev Dines
- 455 Ron Watson
- 456 Bobby Dimond
- 457 Leo Trevena
- 458 Dudley Beger
- 459 Don Stait
- 1951
- 460 Arthur Collinson
- 461 Peter Long
- 462 Keith Cullen
- 463 Jack Rudd
- 464 Keith Deacon
- 465 Hec Farrell
- 466 Eddie Hooper
- 467 K Muddell
- 1952
- 468 Bill Callinan
- 469 Gerry Lowe
- 470 Col Ratcliff
- 471 Don Schofield
- 472 Bede Goff
- 473 R Smith
- 474 F Mullens
- 475 Jack Dickerson
- 1953
- 476 W Smith
- 477 Ernie Church
- 478 Mick Carrig
- 479 Jim McKenzie
- 480 Bob Sargent
- 481 Keith Lennard
- 482 Brian Ogle
- 483 Max Caldwell
- 484 Dale Puren
- 485 Barry Owens
- 486 Reg Southam
- 487 Peter Wooden
- 488 Ted Brennan
- 1954
- 489 Neville Charlton
- 490 Don Graham
- 491 Bill Owens
- 492 Doug Smith
- 493 Johnny Thompson
- 494 W Lowe
- 495 Kevin Owens
- 496 E Burnett
- 497 Jim Fleming
- 498 Bob Tucker
- 499 Jack Gibson
- 500 Bill Carson
- 501 John Harrison
- 502 E Wynn
- 503 M Godfrey
- 504 J Leslie
- 505 Bill Brown
- 506 Pat Toohey
- 1955
- 507 Bill Bailey
- 508 John Brest
- 509 Don Collier
- 510 Pat Hyde
- 511 Jack Plater
- 512 Dick Murphy
- 513 P Williamson
- 514 Noel Trevena
- 515 K Thompson
- 516 Monty Porter
- 517 Geoff Jurd
- 1956
- 518 Darcy Henry
- 519 Ernie Hills
- 520 Ian Johnston
- 521 Don Meehan
- 522 Kel O'Shea
- 523 Mark Patch
- 524 Cliff Smailes
- 525 Harry Wells
- 526 Pat Daley
- 527 Noel Hurley
- 528 Ray Aldrich
- 529 Fred Delaney
- 530 Peter Hargreaves
- 1957
- 531 Doug Hambilton
- 532 Darcy Russell
- 533 Brian Shannon
- 534 Ron Sudlow
- 535 Les Midson
- 536 Doug Harrison
- 537 Ernie Johnson
- 538 Brian Isaacs
- 1958
- 539 Buddy Bowman
- 540 Peter Dimond
- 541 Rees Duncan
- 542 Doug Jones
- 543 Jack Mantle
- 544 Don Malone
- 545 Bernie Kelly
- 546 Colin Wells
- 547 Fred Graber
- 548 John Dawson
- 1959
- 549 Ian Moir
- 550 John Taunton
- 551 Ray McDermott
- 552 John Mowbray
- 553 Dick Poole
- 554 Frank Clegg
- 555 John Conna
- 556 George Downie
- 557 Dave Barsley
- 558 Roger Buttenshaw
- 559 Joe Ryan
- 1960
- 560 Denis Meaney
- 561 Garry Russell
- 562 Arthur Summons
- 563 Ken Bray
- 564 Max Carter
- 565 Kevin Cocks
- 566 Bill Tonkin
- 1961
- 567 John Hayes
- 568 Billy Martin
- 569 Don Parish
- 570 Kevin Smyth
- 571 John Rochester
- 572 Noel Kelly
- 573 Fred Norden
- 1962
- 574 Gil MacDougall
- 575 Brian Henderson
- 576 Bob McGuinness
- 577 Don Hall
- 578 Carl Ross
- 579 Jim Cody
- 580 Wal Hinkley
- 1963
- 581 Bob McLaughlin
- 582 Jack Gibson
- 1964
- 583 Ken Owens
- 584 Ray Picklum
- 585 Dennis Laverty
- 586 John Armstrong
- 587 Ron Costello
- 588 Doug Page
- 589 Roy Ferguson
- 590 John Kearns
- 591 Brian Kowald
- 592 James Gibson
- 593 Pat Thomas
- 594 Denis Culpan
- 1965
- 595 Noel Thornton
- 526 Dick Pickett
- 527 Denis Pittard
- 598 Jim Brophy
- 599 Graham Bevan
- 600 Bill Wilson
- 601 Bill Hansen
- 602 Barry Bryant
- 603 Peter Burnicle
- 1966
- 604 John Elford
- 605 Alan Allison
- 606 John Walsh
- 1967
- 607 Ken Stonestreet
- 608 Noel Dolton
- 609 Bob Smith
- 610 Doug Walkaden
- 611 Tony Ford
- 612 Barry Glasgow
- 613 Tony Packham
- 614 Peter Chapman
- 615 Ross Goodman
- 616 Bruce Beer
- 1968
- 617 John Maxwell
- 618 Rod Smith
- 619 John Walsh
- 620 Mick Alchin
- 621 Neville Hornery
- 622 Tim Murphy
- 623 Steve Winter
- 624 John Baker
- 625 Peter Flanders
- 1969
- 626 Gary Gunton
- 627 John Fisher
- 628 Frank Tagg
- 629 Don Rogers
- 630 Geoff Henry
- 631 Tommy Raudonikis
- 632 Walter James
- 633 Gary Weston
- 634 Jon Clark
- 1970
- 635 Tony Antunac
- 636 Wayne Merry
- 637 Derek Brouwer
- 638 Jeff Nielsen
- 639 Kevin Timbs
- 640 Ivan Jones
- 1971
- 641 Dick Timbs
- 642 Neville Sinclair
- 643 George Skeers
- 644 Russell Mullins
- 645 Noel Hurford
- 646 Russell Johnstone
- 647 Brian Winney
- 648 Barry Boss
- 649 Col Withers
- 650 Jim Croucher
- 1972
- 651 John Heyward
- 652 Stephen Knight
- 653 John Walker
- 654 John O'Bryan
- 655 Olaf Prattl
- 656 John Sheridan
- 657 Steve Satterley
- 658 Allan Ashmore
- 659 Gary Rose
- 660 Peter Handcock
- 661 John Glachan
- 662 Geoff Foster
- 663 Terry Mullins
- 1973
- 664 Shane Day
- 665 Brian Isbester
- 666 Jim Murphy
- 667 Robbie Parker
- 668 Ted Walton
- 669 Nick Moroko
- 670 Jim Myers
- 671 Phil Franks
- 1974
- 672 Dave Oliveri
- 673 John Purcell
- 674 Warren Snodgrass
- 675 Steve Rigney
- 676 Mick Liubinskas
- 677 John Dorahy
- 678 Pat Hundy
- 679 Graeme O'Grady
- 680 Russell Worth
- 681 Ron Giteau
- 682 Geoff Smith
- 1975
- 683 John Donnelly
- 684 Terry Rose
- 685 Chris Wellman
- 686 Trevor Scarr
- 687 Ken Hey
- 688 Greg McTeigue
- 689 Peter Young
- 690 Trevor Reardon
- 1976
- 691 Les Boyd
- 692 Wayne Smith
- 693 Peter Walsh
- 694 Steve Blyth
- 695 Geoff Gardiner
- 1977
- 696 Doug Lucas
- 697 Gavin Miller
- 698 Don Moseley
- 699 Ken Bourke
- 700 Peter Rowles
- 701 Kerry Morrison
- 702 Bob Cooper
- 703 Alan Neil
- 704 Marshall Rogers
- 705 Garry Walsh
- 706 Steve Eisenhuth
- 707 Peter Lema
- 708 Dave Kennedy
- 1978
- 709 Eric Cain
- 710 Bruce Gibbs
- 711 John Crow
- 712 Garry Clarke
- 713 Stephen Broughton
- 714 David Waite
- 715 Bill Cloughessy
- 716 Ron Brodrick
- 1979
- 717 Warren Boland
- 718 Ray Brown
- 719 Jack Jeffries
- 720 Brian Cook
- 721 Mark Beaven
- 722 Gerard Crowe
- 723 Col Ensor
- 724 Pat Hurney
- 725 Terry Leabeater
- 726 Tony Armstrong
- 727 Peter Barr
- 1980
- 728 Jeff Case
- 729 Ted Goodwin
- 730 Jim Leis
- 731 Paul Merlo
- 732 Wayne Buckley
- 733 John Ribot
- 734 Terry Lamb
- 735 Alan Latham
- 736 John McLeod
- 737 Tom Arber
- 738 Michael Duke
- 1981
- 739 Garry Dowling
- 740 Ian Schubert
- 741 Greg Cox
- 742 Trevor Cogger
- 743 Garry Jack
- 744 Ross Conlon
- 745 George Moroko
- 746 Col Dennis
- 747 Bruce Clark
- 748 Mick Pinkerton
- 749 Geoff Spotswood
- 750 Trevor Ryan
- 1982
- 751 Arthur Mountier
- 752 Bruce Grimaldi
- 753 George Fahd
- 754 Garry Collison
- 755 Brett Gale
- 756 Steve Anderson
- 757 Robert Ryan
- 758 Charlie Khalifeh
- 759 Greg McElhone
- 760 David Greene
- 1983
- 761 Peter Burgmann
- 762 Ian Freeman
- 763 Scott Gale
- 764 David Hall
- 765 George Ghosn
- 766 Bill Hilliard
- 767 Brian Battese
- 768 Paul Gearin
- 769 John Cogger
- 770 Paul Beaven
- 771 Mark Massone
- 772 Mick Neil
- 773 Matt Carter
- 774 David Harris
- 775 Brett Davidson
- 776 Peter Lamb
- 777 Grant Fyvie
- 778 Allan Woods
- 779 Kevin Bryson
- 780 Bob Muirhead
- 1984
- 781 Gerald Celarc
- 782 John Coveney
- 783 Pat English
- 784 Allen Geelan
- 785 Mark Harrigan
- 786 Craig Madsen
- 787 John McArthur
- 788 Gary Webster
- 789 Leo Epifania
- 790 Eddie Flahey
- 791 Darryl Turner
- 792 Craig Ellis
- 793 Gerry Byron
- 794 Steve Kerr
- 795 Scott Rigney
- 796 Brett Clark
- 797 George Katsogiannis
- 798 Allan Fallah
- 799 David Stafford
- 1985
- 800 Greg Duval
- 801 Mark Lawson
- 802 Chris Stephandellis
- 803 Gary Warnecke
- 804 Mark Keehan
- 805 Craig Clarke
- 806 Steve Want
- 807 Wayne Wigham
- 808 Steve Ewer
- 809 Gary Pearce
- 810 Geoff Dillon
- 811 Steve Mullen
- 812 Tom Robbins
- 813 Lee Crooks
- 814 Peter Worth
- 815 Geoff Sutton
- 816 Greg Brown
- 817 Troy McGregor
- 818 Charlie Eltoubgi
- 819 Craig Neil
- 820 Greg Falkner
- 821 Gary McFarlane
- 1986
- 822 Alan Burns
- 823 Paul Sheahan
- 824 Wilfred Williams
- 825 Brett Davis
- 826 Rod Pethybridge
- 827 John Bilbija
- 828 Ian Naden
- 829 Noel Mancuso
- 830 Grahame Jennings
- 831 Doug Rawlings
- 832 Deryck Fox
- 833 John Henderson
- 834 Des Drummond
- 835 John Elias
- 1987
- 836 Phillip Duke
- 837 Wayne Lambkin
- 838 Steve McCoy
- 839 Les White
- 840 John Allanson
- 841 Scott Tronc
- 842 Terry Donnellan
- 843 Mark Meskell
- 844 Denis Kinchela
- 845 Hew Rees
- 846 Jason Williams
- 847 Andrew Stewart
- 1988
- 848 Cameron Blair
- 849 Chris Blair
- 850 Gary Bukowski
- 851 Dave Gallagher
- 852 Dale Hall
- 853 Graham Mackay
- 854 Danny Peacock
- 855 Wayne Simonds
- 856 Mick Taylor
- 857 Craig Teitzel
- 858 Dave Woods
- 859 Michael Hoy
- 860 Ian Howcroft
- 861 Michael McClintock
- 862 Mark Bevan
- 863 Jason Stafford
- 864 Ernie Garland
- 865 Jason Lidden
- 866 Peter Vale
- 867 Michael McKinnon
- 868 Dave Wellings
- 869 Brian Brown
- 1989
- 870 Stephen Funnell
- 871 Shane Leigh
- 872 Pat O'Doherty
- 873 Nick Stevanovic
- 874 Shane Flanagan
- 875 Michael Gould
- 876 Brendon Tuuta
- 877 Richard Smith
- 878 Darren Girard
- 879 Brett Docherty
- 880 Stuart Raper
- 881 Kelvin Skerrett
- 882 Ellery Hanley
- 883 Garry Schofield
- 884 Darren Britt
- 885 Stan Presdee
- 1990
- 886 Tony Cosatto
- 887 Shaun Devine
- 888 Ivan Henjak
- 889 Steve Jackson
- 890 Bob Lindner
- 891 Jason Taylor
- 892 Jamie Ainscough
- 893 Tim Perrin
- 894 Graham Spinks
- 895 Angelo Alavanja
- 896 Russell Wyer
- 897 Chris Warren
- 898 Jason Kelly
- 899 Noel Goldthorpe
- 900 Paul Fuz
- 901 Shaun O'Bryan
- 1991
- 902 Stephen Burns
- 903 Jim Dymock
- 904 Tony Rampling
- 905 Joe Thomas
- 906 Ron Gibbs
- 907 David Gillespie
- 908 Andrew Farrar
- 909 Graeme Wynn
- 910 Peter Trevitt
- 911 Reece Webb
- 912 Mark Williams
- 913 Bronko Djura
- 914 Robert Burgess
- 915 Paul Langmack
- 1992
- 916 Mark Bell
- 917 Terry Hill
- 918 Darren Willis
- 919 Anthony Xuereb
- 920 Kyle White
- 921 David Anderson
- 922 Evan Cochrane
- 923 Billy Noke
- 924 Damien McGarry
- 925 Wayne Taekata
- 926 Stephen Kearney
- 927 Malcolm Wheeler
- 928 Jason Alchin
- 929 Scott Hardy
- 1993
- 930 Justin Dooley
- 931 Steve Georgallis
- 932 Andrew Leeds
- 933 Steve O'Dea
- 934 Matt Ryan
- 935 Charlie Saab
- 936 Josh White
- 937 Andrew Willis
- 938 Justin Moloney
- 939 Brad Hughes
- 940 Darrien Doherty
- 941 Glenn Grief
- 942 Mark Afflick
- 943 Craig Menkins
- 944 Chris Williams
- 945 Brett Cullen
- 946 Jason Benge
- 947 Mark Hill
- 948 Aseri Laing
- 949 Gerome Lane
- 1994
- 950 Darren Brown
- 951 Dale Fritz
- 952 Ewan McGrady
- 953 Jim Serdaris
- 954 Paul Smith
- 955 Brent Stuart
- 956 Neil Tierney
- 957 Manoa Thompson
- 958 Illiesa Toga
- 959 Jason Eade
- 960 Stuart Coupland
- 961 David Wonson
- 962 Brandon Pearson
- 963 Bill Dunn
- 964 Ciriaco Mescia
- 965 Ken McGuinness
- 966 Peter Shiels
- 1995
- 967 Darren Burns
- 968 Damian Driscoll
- 969 Mark Horo
- 970 Damian Kennedy
- 971 Grant Trindall
- 972 Paul Bell
- 973 Tony Wall
- 974 Kevin McGuinness
- 975 David Myers
- 976 David Seidenkamp
- 1996
- 977 Jason Austin
- 978 Craig Coleman
- 979 Jason Duff
- 980 Chad Harris
- 981 Darren Capovilla
- 982 Andrew Hick
- 983 Nathan Hodges
- 984 John Skandalis
- 985 Harvey Howard
- 986 Michael O'Neall
- 987 Willie Newton
- 988 Nathan Lakeman
- 1997
- 989 Des Hasler
- 990 Shane Millard
- 991 Jimmy Smith
- 992 Shaun Walliss
- 993 Chris Yates
- 994 Adam Doyle
- 995 Adam Donovan
- 996 Shayne McMenemy
- 997 Brett Taylor
- 998 Brett Hodgson
- 999 Savenaca Lomanimako
- 1000 Gary Dowse
- 1001 Brett Hickman
- 1998
- 1002 Scott Coxon
- 1003 Darren Rameka
- 1004 Leo Dynevor
- 1005 Adrian Rainey
- 1006 Don Smith
- 1007 Jason Keough
- 1008 Brenton Pomery
- 1009 Leo Clarke
- 1010 Nick Edwards
- 1011 Ben MacDougall
- 1012 Lincoln Raudonikis
- 1013 Dayle Bonner
- 1014 Ron Jones
- 1015 Brett Warton
- 1016 Darren Fritz
- 1017 Jared Mills
- 1018 Ashley Rhodes
- 1019 Darryl Fisher
- 1020 Travis Baker
- 1021 Aaron Cotter
- 1022 Trent Brown
- 1999
- 1023 Adam Bristow
- 1024 Justin Brooker
- 1025 Paul Jeffries
- 1026 Robbie Payne
- 1027 Shane Perry
- 1028 Tevita Amone
- 1029 Dane Dorahy
- 1030 Luke Goodwin
- 1031 Marshall Scott
- 1032 Michael Brabek
- 1033 Matt Fuller
- 1034 David Buko
- 1035 Barry Davis
- 1036 Matt Spence
- 1037 Tate Moseley
- 1038 Chris Marland
- 1039 Ray Cashmere

== Notable fans ==
- Doug Sutherland, mayor of Sydney (1980–87)
- Trooper Mark Donaldson VC
- Paul Gerantonis (1969–current)
- Malcolm T. Elliott (radio broadcaster)
- John Singleton (entrepreneur, businessman and horse racing identity)
- Steve Waugh (former Australian Cricket captain)
- Ken Callander
- John Coates (Australian Olympic Committee chairman)
- Michael Clarke former Australian Cricket Captain

== See also ==
- Wests Tigers
