= Harold Leddy =

Australian rugby league footballer (1893-1971)

Personal information
- Full name: Harold James Leddy
- Born: 17 November 1893 Woollahra, New South Wales, Australia
- Died: 7 May 1971 (aged 77)

Playing information
- Position: Lock, Second-row
Club
Years	Team	Pld	T	G	FG	P
1915–24	Western Suburbs	113	37	0	0	111
Representative
Years	Team	Pld	T	G	FG	P
1921–23	New South Wales	2	0	0	0	0
1922	Metropolis	2	0	0	0	0

Harold James Leddy (1893-1971) was an Australian rugby league footballer who played from the mid-1910s to the mid-1920s.

== Playing career ==
Leddy played nine seasons with Western Suburbs from 1915 to 1924. He also represented New South Wales in 1921 and 1923. He was part of the Western Suburbs team which finished as runners up in 1918.

== Death ==
Leddy died on 7 May 1971, aged 78.
