= Ed Courtney Jr. =

Australian rugby league footballer (1905–1986)

Ed Courtney
Personal information
- Full name: Edward Henry Joseph Courtney
- Born: 21 November 1905 Sydney, New South Wales, Australia
- Died: 3 May 1986 (aged 80) Penshurst, New South Wales, Australia

Playing information
- Position: Second-row
Club
Years	Team	Pld	T	G	FG	P
1924–29	Western Suburbs	29	12	3	0	42
1931	St. George	6	1	0	0	3
	Total	35	13	3	0	45
- Father: Tedda Courtney
- Relatives: Harry Courtney (brother)

Edward Henry Joseph Courtney (1905–1986) was an Australian rugby league footballer who played in the 1920s and 1930s.

== Background ==
Ed Courtney Jr. was the son of the noted pioneer Australian rugby league player, Tedda Courtney and brother of Harry Courtney

== Playing career ==
Courtney started his career at Western Suburbs during his father's last year at the club, making them the only known father and son combination ever to play together in the NSWRFL.

Courtney went on to play five seasons at the Western Suburbs between 1924 and 1929. By 1930, he had set up a grocery/bakery business at Scarborough Street, Monterey, New South Wales and he transferred to St. George for his final year in first grade. He stayed in the St. George area for more than 50 years before his death in 1986.

== Death ==
Courtney died on 3 May 1986. He was survived by his wife Stella, his son and daughter.
