= Tedda Courtney =

Australian RL coach and Australia international rugby league footballer

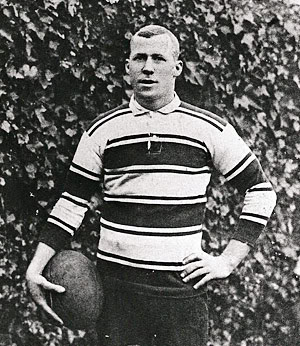
- Courtney in 1908

Personal information
- Full name: Joseph Edward Courtney
- Born: 29 August 1884 Townsville, Queensland, Australia
- Died: 23 July 1957 (aged 72) Lakemba, New South Wales, Australia

Playing information
- Position: Forward
Club
Years	Team	Pld	T	G	FG	P
1908	Newtown	7	1	0	0	4
1909	Western Suburbs	5	1	0	0	4
1910	North Sydney	12	1	0	0	4
1911–24	Western Suburbs	156	34	2	0	140
	Total	180	37	2	0	152
Representative
Years	Team	Pld	T	G	FG	P
1908–15	New South Wales	9	2	0	0	6
1908–14	Australia	11	1	0	0	3
1910	Australasia	2	1	0	0	3
1908–15	Metropolis	4	3	0	0	9

Coaching information
Club
Years	Team	Gms	W	D	L	W%
1923	Western Suburbs	0	0	0	0
1930	North Sydney	14	2	1	11	14
1935	Canterbury-Bankstown	16	2	0	14	13
	Total	30	4	1	25	13
- Relatives: Ed Courtney Jr. (son); Harry Courtney (son)

Ed "Tedda" Courtney (29 August 1884 – 23 July 1957) was a pioneer Australian rugby league footballer and coach. He played club football for North Sydney, Western Suburbs and representative football for the New South Wales state and Australian national sides. He is considered one of the nation's finest footballers of the 20th century.

Born in Townsville, Courtney was one of six brothers who all played for North Sydney. His brothers Raymond and Robert died in World War I. He was a wharfie throughout his working life and was renowned for his fearless tackling style and ability to harass the opposition with his defence.

Courtney a 1911 Kangaroo

== Playing career ==
=== Rugby union ===
Courtney played rugby union for North Sydney and for St George. He was one of the group of New South Wales rugby footballers who played against Baskerville's All Golds on their seminal trip to the United Kingdom in 1907 which started rugby league in Australia and New Zealand. He played in the second of the three exhibition matches; was promptly banned from amateur rugby union thereafter and the following year was given a vote of thanks by being made a lifetime member of the New South Wales Rugby League.

=== Rugby league ===
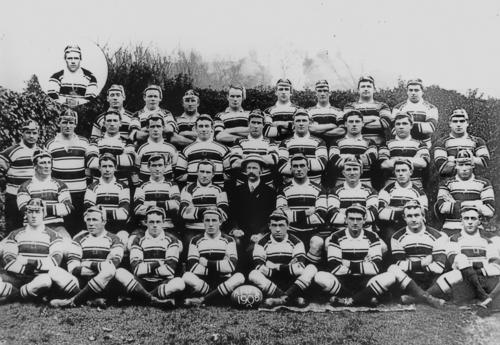
Tedda front 2nd from left Pioneer Kangaroos 1908-09

Tedda Courtney had a first-grade career that lasted 16 seasons.

Courtney joined Newtown in 1908 in the professional code, moved to Wests in 1909 and the North Sydney in 1910. He found his club home back at Wests in 1911 where he played the next thirteen seasons, amassing over 300 games across all grades.

He was selected on the inaugural Kangaroo tour of 1908-09 appearing in all three Tests and in a total of thirty-one games on tour on which he was the top-scoring forward with 10 tries. He made a second Kangaroo tour in 1911-12 in which he made twenty five match appearances. He played in three other Test series against Great Britain at home in 1910 and 1914 and against New Zealand in 1909, he also represented Australasia. In 1924 when Courtney was 38 he played in 2 games for Wests alongside his son, Ed Courtney, Jr., against Glebe on 14 June and against Balmain on 5 July. These are the only times a father and son combination played together in the Sydney first grade competition.

He is listed on the Australian Players register as Kangaroo No.37.

== Coaching career ==
Courtney was captain-coach of the Western Suburbs team in 1923. He retired as a player at the end of 1924 and returned to the district of his football beginnings – North Sydney. He coached the lower grades for some years and coached North Sydney's first grade side in 1930.

Courtney's coaching services were obtained by the newly formed Canterbury-Bankstown DRLFC for their first season in 1935.

== Accolades ==
In September 2004 Courtney was named at prop in the Western Suburbs Magpies team of the century.

Ted Courtney was a Life Member of the New South Wales Rugby League.

In February 2008, Courtney was named in the list of Australia's 100 Greatest Players (1908–2007) which was commissioned by the NRL and ARL to celebrate the code's centenary year in Australia. Courtney was assigned inductee number 2 in the NRL Hall of Fame.
