= Dudley Beger =

Australian rugby league footballer, coach and administrator

Personal information
- Full name: Dudley John Beger
- Born: 30 December 1928 Sydney, Australia
- Died: 20 May 1994 (aged 65)

Playing information
- Position: Five-eighth, Halfback
Club
Years	Team	Pld	T	G	FG	P
1950–53	Western Suburbs	25	0	5	0	10

Coaching information
Club
Years	Team	Gms	W	D	L	W%
1960	Western Suburbs	22	13	0	9	59
- Source: As of 19 February 2019

Dudley John Beger (1928–1994) was an Australian rugby league footballer who played in the 1950s, and coached in the 1960s.

== Playing and coaching career ==
Beger played his grade career at Western Suburbs for four years between 1950 and 1953. After retiring as a player, he went into coaching the lower grades at Wests before ultimately taking over the first grade team for one season in 1960.

== Later life ==
Beger went on to an administrative career at Western Suburbs, becoming club secretary in the 1970s.

Beger died on 18 May 1994, aged 65.
