= Gordon Vaughan =

Australian rugby league footballer

Personal information
- Full name: Gordon John Vaughan
- Born: 21 May 1898 Sydney, New South Wales, Australia
- Died: 22 May 1952 (aged 54) Coogee, New South Wales

Playing information
- Position: Wing, Centre
Club
Years	Team	Pld	T	G	FG	P
1916–21	South Sydney	36	25	1	0	77
Representative
Years	Team	Pld	T	G	FG	P
1919	Metropolis	1	0	0	0	0
- Source: As of 1 May 2019

Gordon Vaughan (1898–1952) was an Australian professional rugby league footballer who played in the 1910s and 1920s. He played for South Sydney in the New South Wales Rugby League (NSWRL) competition.

== Playing career ==
Vaughan made his first grade debut for South Sydney against Balmain in Round 13 1916 at the Sydney Cricket Ground.

In the same year, South Sydney reached the grand final against Balmain. The final was required to be played due to both clubs finishing on equal points. Balmain went into the halftime break with a 5–0 lead. In the second half, Vaughan scored a try to make the score 5–3. Despite repeated attacks at the Balmain line, Souths were unable to score another try and lost the grand final which was played in front of a low crowd of 7,000 at the Sydney Cricket Ground.

The following season, Vaughan played 10 games as Souths finished second on the table behind Balmain who were declared premiers without needing to play in another final. Vaughan missed the entire 1918 season as Souths won the premiership only losing 2 games throughout the campaign. In 1919, Vaughan was selected to play for Metropolis, which was the earlier version of the current day NSW City rugby league team. Souths would go on to finish as runners up again in 1920.

In his final year at Souths, Vaughan scored 6 tries in 6 games. Vaughan retired at the end of 1921. In total, Vaughan scored 33 tries in 38 matches across all grades including the City Cup matches.
