= George Moore (rugby league) =

Australian rugby league footballer

Personal information
- Full name: George Moore

Playing information
- Position: Second-row, Lock, Prop
Club
Years	Team	Pld	T	G	FG	P
1916–19	South Sydney	43	3	0	0	9
- Source: As of 1 May 2019

George Moore was an Australian rugby league footballer who played in the 1910s. He played for South Sydney in the New South Wales Rugby League (NSWRL) competition.

== Playing career ==
Moore made his first grade debut for South Sydney against Newtown in Round 1 1916 at Erskineville Oval, Sydney in a 20-0 victory.

In the same year, South Sydney reached the grand final against Balmain with Moore being selected to play at second-row. The final was required to be played due to both clubs finishing on equal points. Balmain went into the halftime break with a 5-0 lead. In the second half, Souths scored a try to bring Balmain's lead back to only 2 points. Despite repeated attacks at the Balmain line, Souths were unable to score another try and lost the grand final which was played in front of a low crowd of 7,000 at the Sydney Cricket Ground.

The following season, Souths again finished as runners up only this time there was no need to play in a final as Balmain finished first on the table clear of Souths. In 1918, Moore played 9 games as Souths claimed the premiership finishing first on the table and only losing twice throughout the season.

Moore retired the following season in 1919. Moore played 52 games for Souths overall across all grades.
