= Ron Watson (rugby league) =

Australian rugby league footballer and coach

Personal information
- Full name: Ronald Thomas Watson
- Born: 16 February 1929; Croydon, New South Wales, Australia
- Died: 2 December 2004 (aged 75); Manly, New South Wales, Australia

Playing information
- Position: Second-row
Club
Years	Team	Pld	T	G	FG	P
1950–56	Western Suburbs	65	8	0	0	24

Coaching information
Club
Years	Team	Gms	W	D	L	W%
1970–71	Western Suburbs	44	10	1	33	23

Ron Watson nicknamed "Bluey" was an Australian professional rugby league footballer who played in the 1950s and coached in the 1970s. He played for Western Suburbs as a second-row and later coached the club from 1970 to 1971.

== Playing career ==
Watson began his career with Western Suburbs in 1950. In 1952, Watson was a member of the Western Suburbs side which claimed their fourth and final premiership defeating South Sydney 22-10 in the grand final. Watson played for three more seasons before retiring as a player in 1956.

== Coaching career ==
Watson began his coaching career in 1970 for Western Suburbs taking over from Noel Kelly. Watson's coaching career was not as successful as his playing career only winning ten matches in two seasons and in his final year finishing with the wooden spoon.
