= Len Stacker =

Australian rugby league footballer and coach

Personal information
- Full name: Len Stacker
- Born: Sydney, New South Wales, Australia

Playing information
- Position: Wing
Club
Years	Team	Pld	T	G	FG	P
1966–67	Parramatta	23	8	62	0	148

Coaching information
Club
Years	Team	Gms	W	D	L	W%
1979–81	Penrith Panthers	66	16	3	47	24
1983	Western Suburbs	26	5	2	19	19
	Total	92	21	5	66	23

Len Stacker is an Australian rugby league footballer who played in the 1960s. He played for Parramatta in the New South Wales Rugby League (NSWRL) competition. He also coached the Penrith Panthers and Western Suburbs in the late 1970s and early 1980s.

== Playing career ==
Stacker made his first grade debut for Parramatta in 1966. Parramatta finished 6th on the table and missed out on the finals but Stacker finished as the club's top point scorer with 59 points. In 1967, Parramatta finished in 9th place and Stacker ended the year as the club's highest point scorer for the second year in a row with 89 points. Stacker then joined Northern Suburbs (known now as Norths Devils) in the Brisbane rugby league competition. Stacker won the 1969 premiership with Norths.

== Coaching career ==
Stacker's first job as a coach was in the lower grades for Parramatta. Stacker coached Parramatta to the 1977 reserve grade premiership. In 1979, Stacker became head coach at Penrith. Stacker spent 3 turbulent seasons at Penrith with the club finishing last in 1980 and second last in 1981. Stacker was then terminated and replaced by John Peard. In 1983, Stacker became the head coach at Western Suburbs but only last one season as Wests finished last on the table.

Stacker then went on to coach St Mary's Saints and the reserve grade side at Penrith. Between 1995 and 2001, Stacker was assistant coach to head coach Royce Simmons at the club. In 2007, Stacker became coach of the Cabramatta Two Blues.
