= Alan Ridley =

Australia international rugby league footballer

Personal information
- Born: 18 July 1910 Coonamble, New South Wales, Australia
- Died: 24 September 1993 (aged 83) Orange, New South Wales, Australia

Playing information
- Weight: 16 st (100 kg)
- Position: Wing
Club
Years	Team	Pld	T	G	FG	P
1929–30	Queanbeyan
1931–36	Western Suburbs	64	64	1	0	194
	Total	64	64	1	0	194
Representative
Years	Team	Pld	T	G	FG	P
1929–36	New South Wales	25	34	4	0	110
1929–36	Australia	5	1	0	0	3
1933–36	NSW City	5	11	0	0	33
1932	Metropolis	1	0	0	0	0
1929	NSW Country	1	1	0	0	3
- Source: As of 4 July 2019

Alan Ridley OBE (1910–1993) was an Australian rugby league footballer who played in the 1920s and 1930s. An Australian international and New South Wales interstate representative winger, he played club football for Sydney's Western Suburbs, with whom he won the 1934 NSWRFL Premiership.

== Playing career ==
He started his career playing for the Acton Rovers of the Canberra competition. Whilst playing for the Queanbeyan "Blues", he was selected to go on the 1929–30 Kangaroo tour of Great Britain. He was the 1932 NSWRFL season's top try scorer with 18 tries. Ridley was selected to go on the 1933–34 Kangaroo tour of Great Britain He scored a record 6 tries in a match for the Western Suburbs Magpies in 1934.

== Post playing ==
Ridley moved to Orange, New South Wales at the end of his rugby league career and later became Mayor of the town. He died there in 1993. He was voted in the Wests Tigers Team of the Century and the Western Suburbs Magpies Team of the Century.
