= 1953 NSWRFL season =

Rugby league competition

1953 New South Wales Rugby Football League
- Teams: 10
- Premiers: South Sydney (14th title)
- Minor premiers: South Sydney (13th title)
- Matches played: 93
- Points scored: 3241
- Top points scorer(s): Ron Rowles (152)
- Wooden spoon: Western Suburbs (9th spoon)
- Top try-scorer(s): Ian Moir (23)

The 1953 New South Wales Rugby Football League season was the forty-sixth season of the rugby league competition based in Sydney. Ten teams from across the city competed for the J. J. Giltinan Shield during the season, which culminated in a final between South Sydney and St. George.

== Teams ==
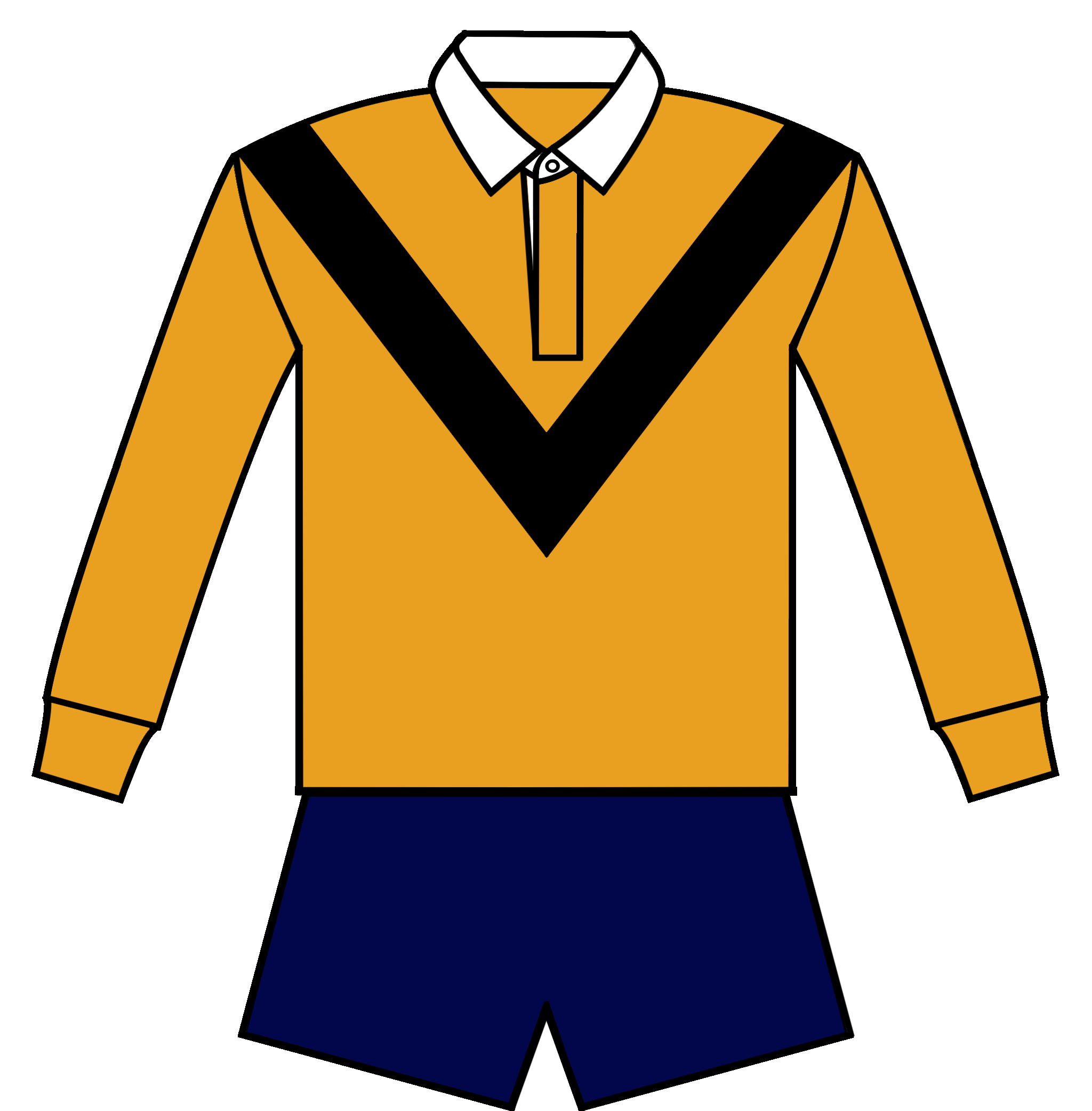
Balmain 46th season Ground: Leichhardt Oval; Coach: Arthur Patton; Captain: Bob Lulham

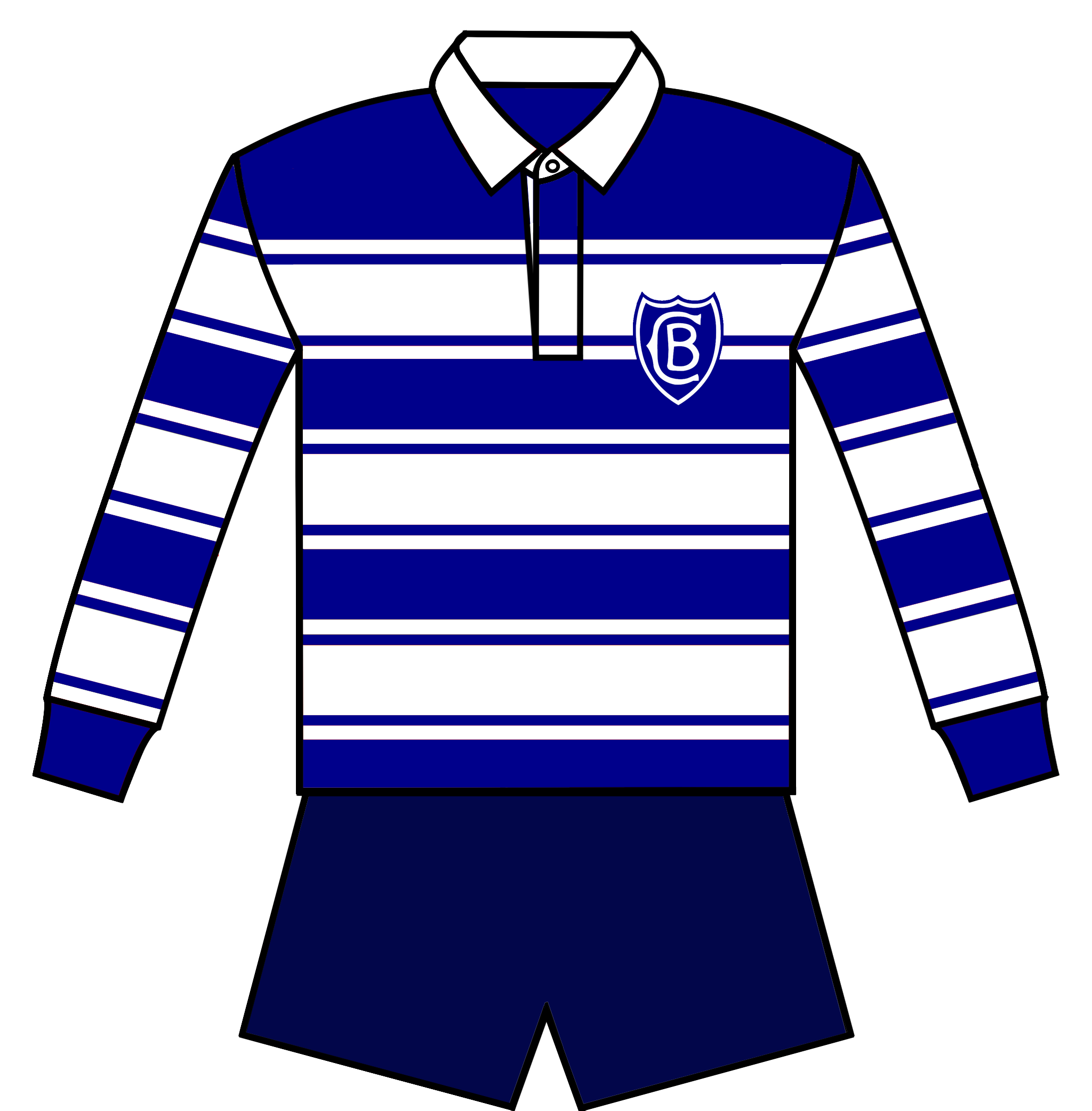
Canterbury-Bankstown 19th season Ground: Belmore Oval; Coach: Jack Hampstead; Captain: Cec Cooper

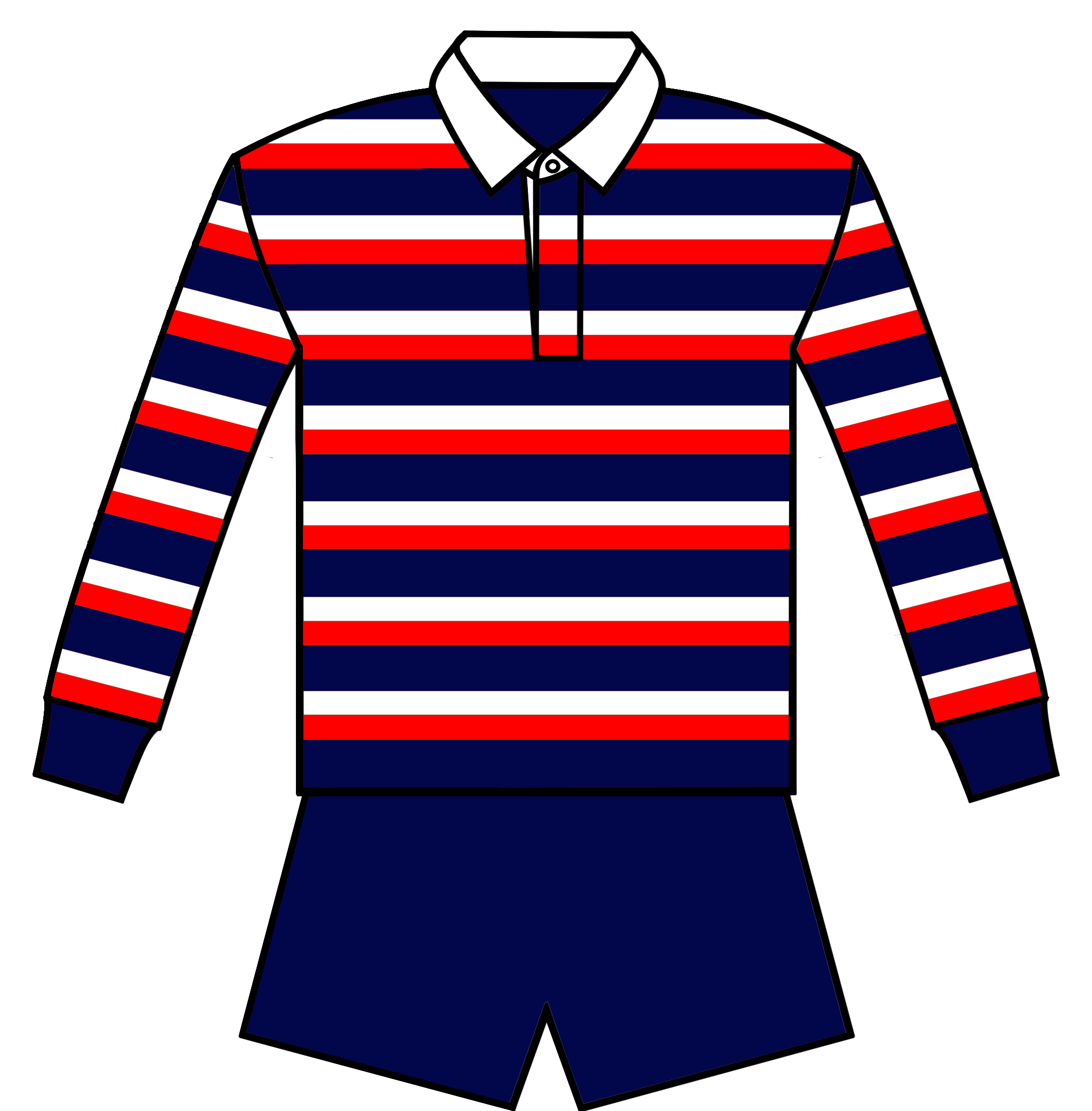
Eastern Suburbs 46th season Ground: Sydney Sports Ground; Captain-Coach: Col Donohoe

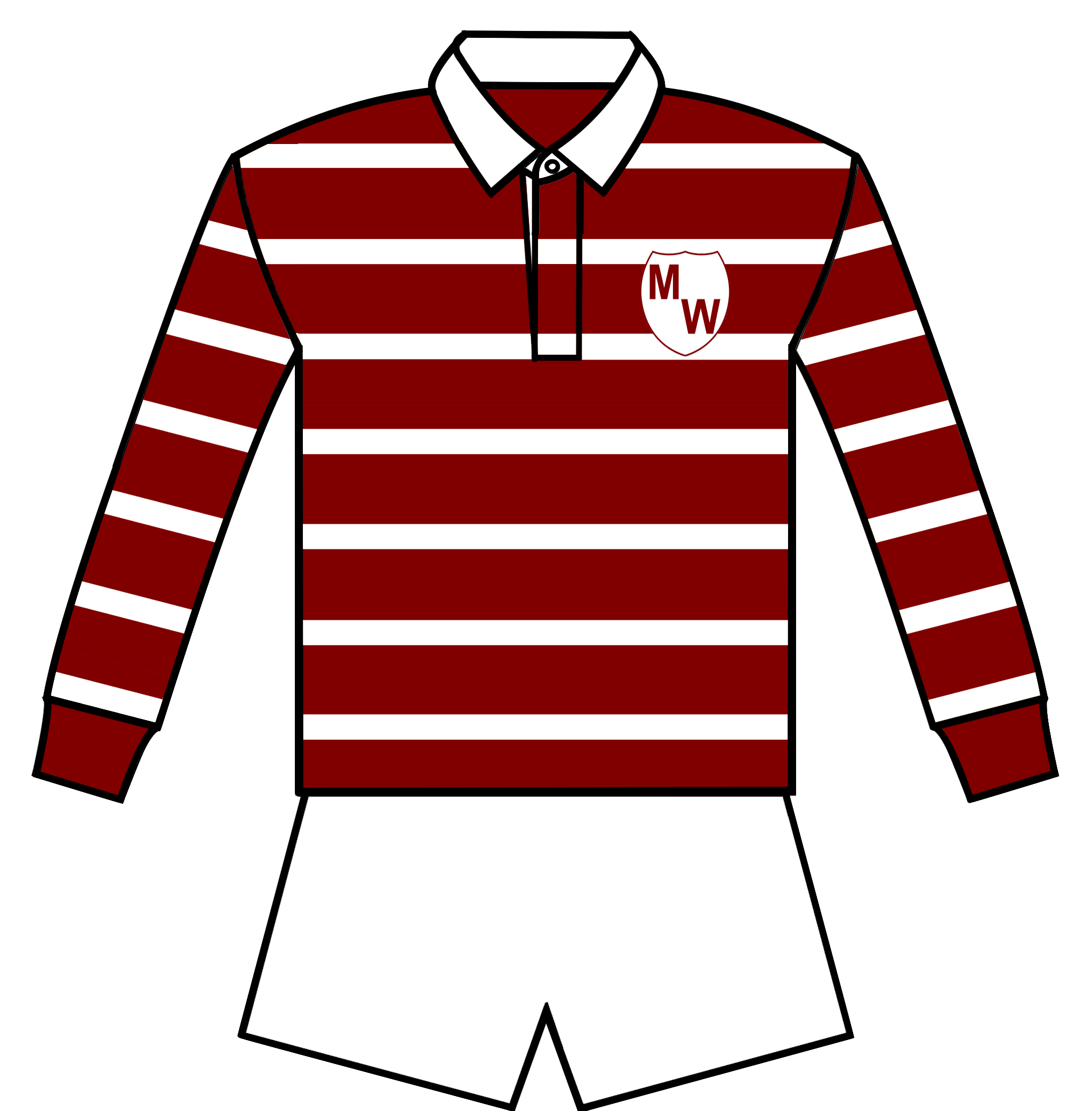
Manly-Warringah 7th season Ground: Brookvale Oval; Captain-Coach: Roy Bull

Newtown 46th season Ground: Erskineville Oval; Captain-Coach: Frank Johnson

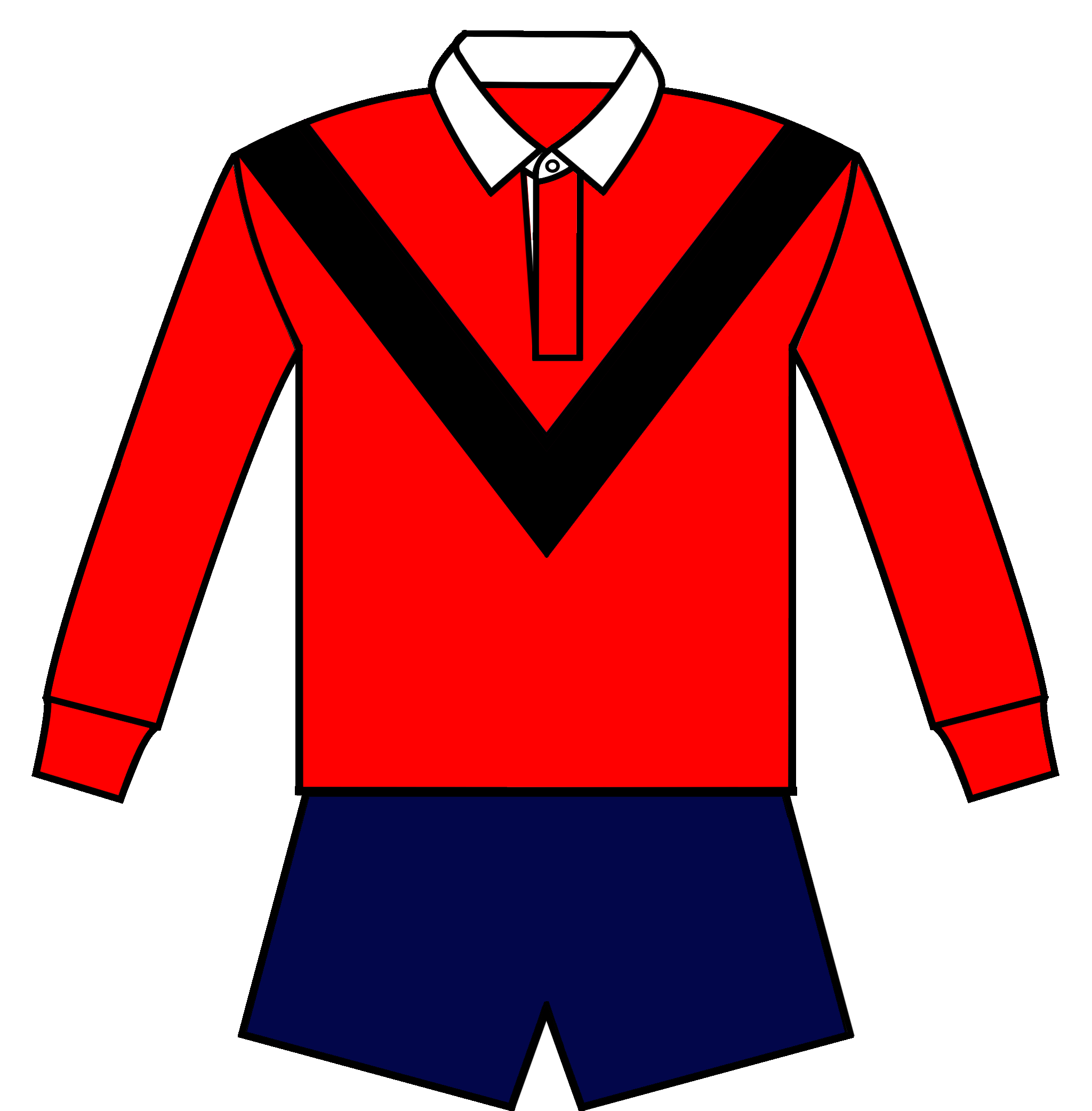
North Sydney 46th season Ground: North Sydney Oval; Coach: Ross McKinnon; Captain: Lloyd Hudson

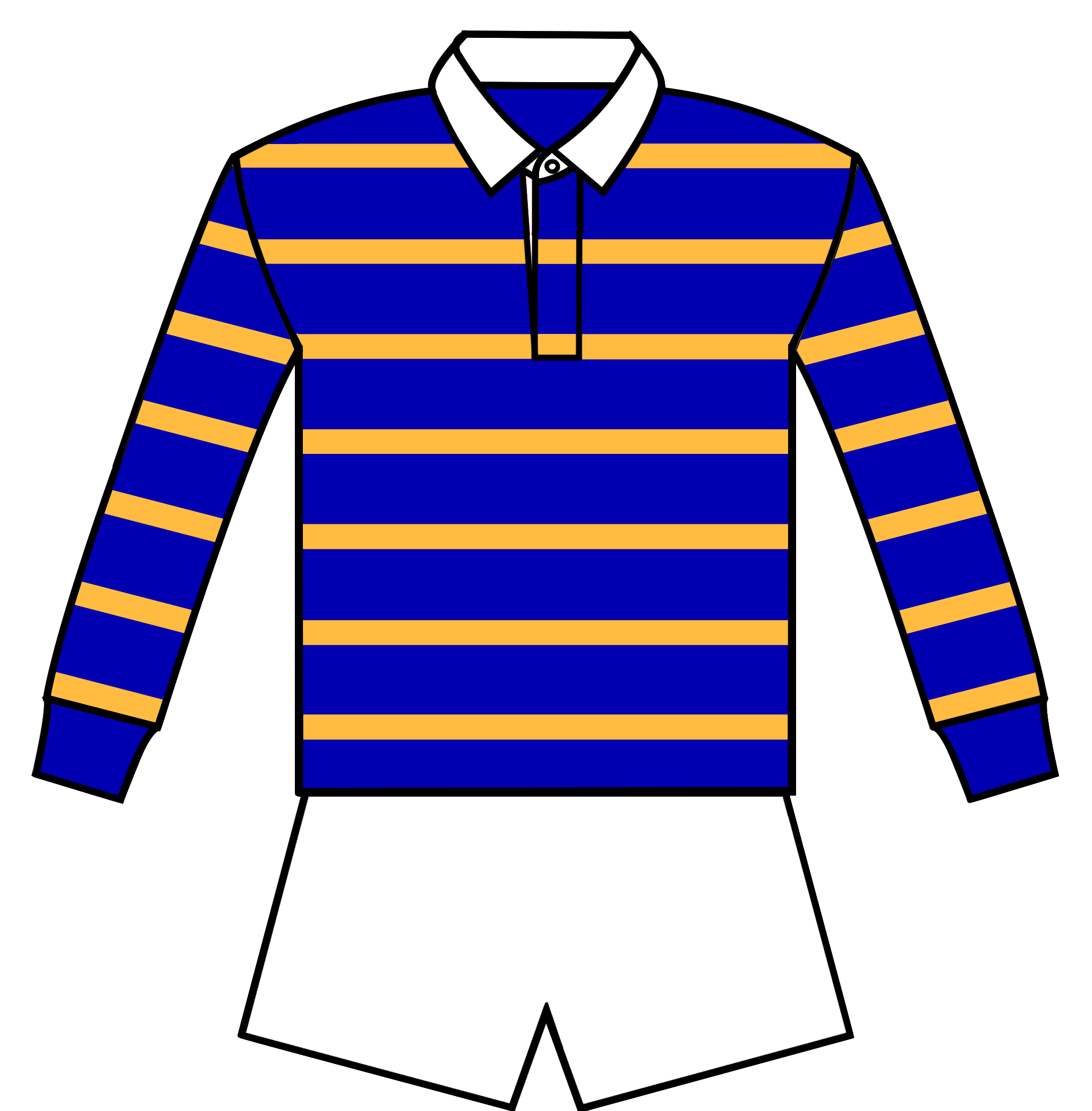
Parramatta 7th season Ground: Cumberland Oval; Coach: Vic Hey; Captain: Ian Johnston

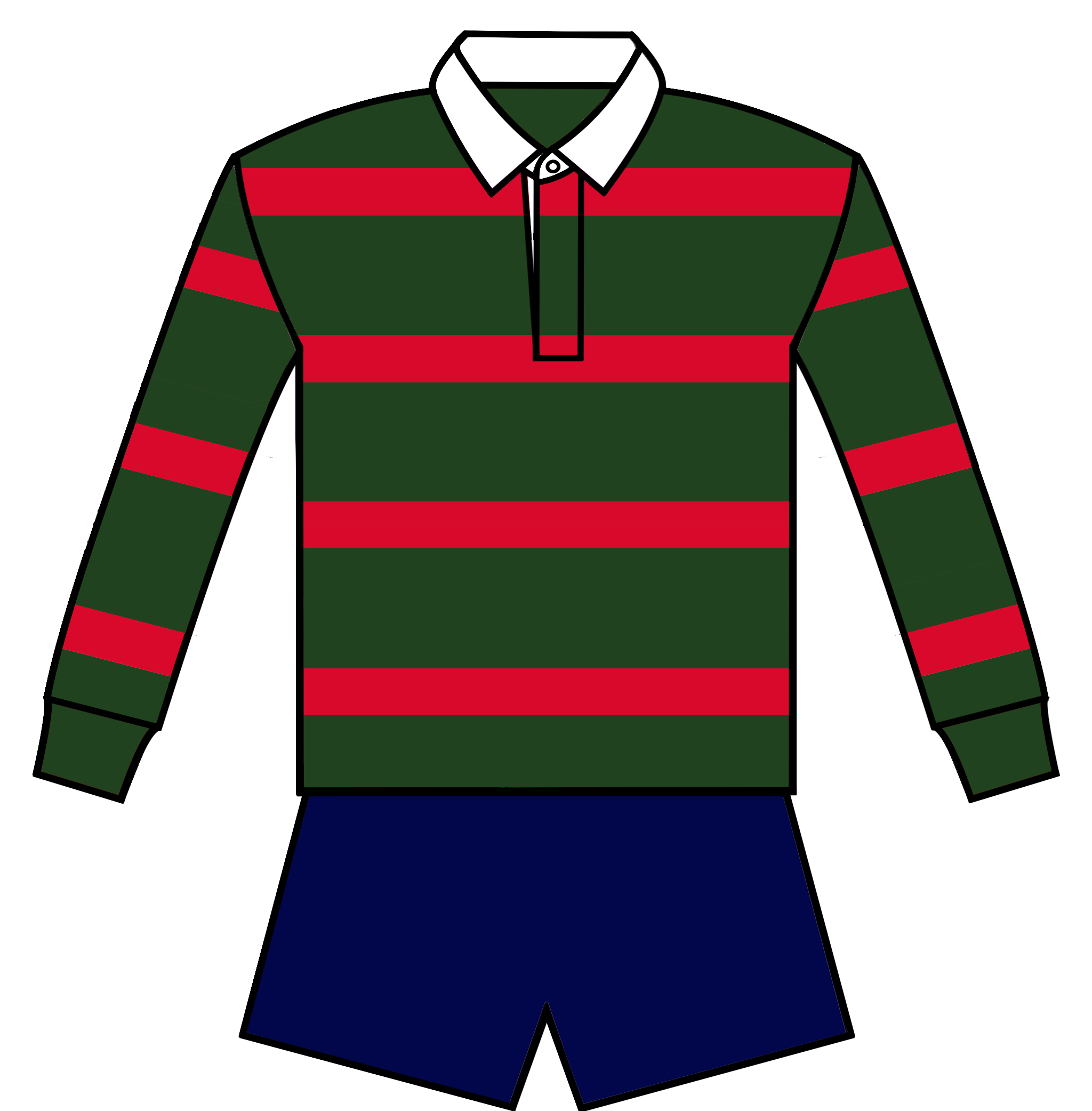
South Sydney 46th season Ground: Redfern Oval; Captain-coach: Jack Rayner

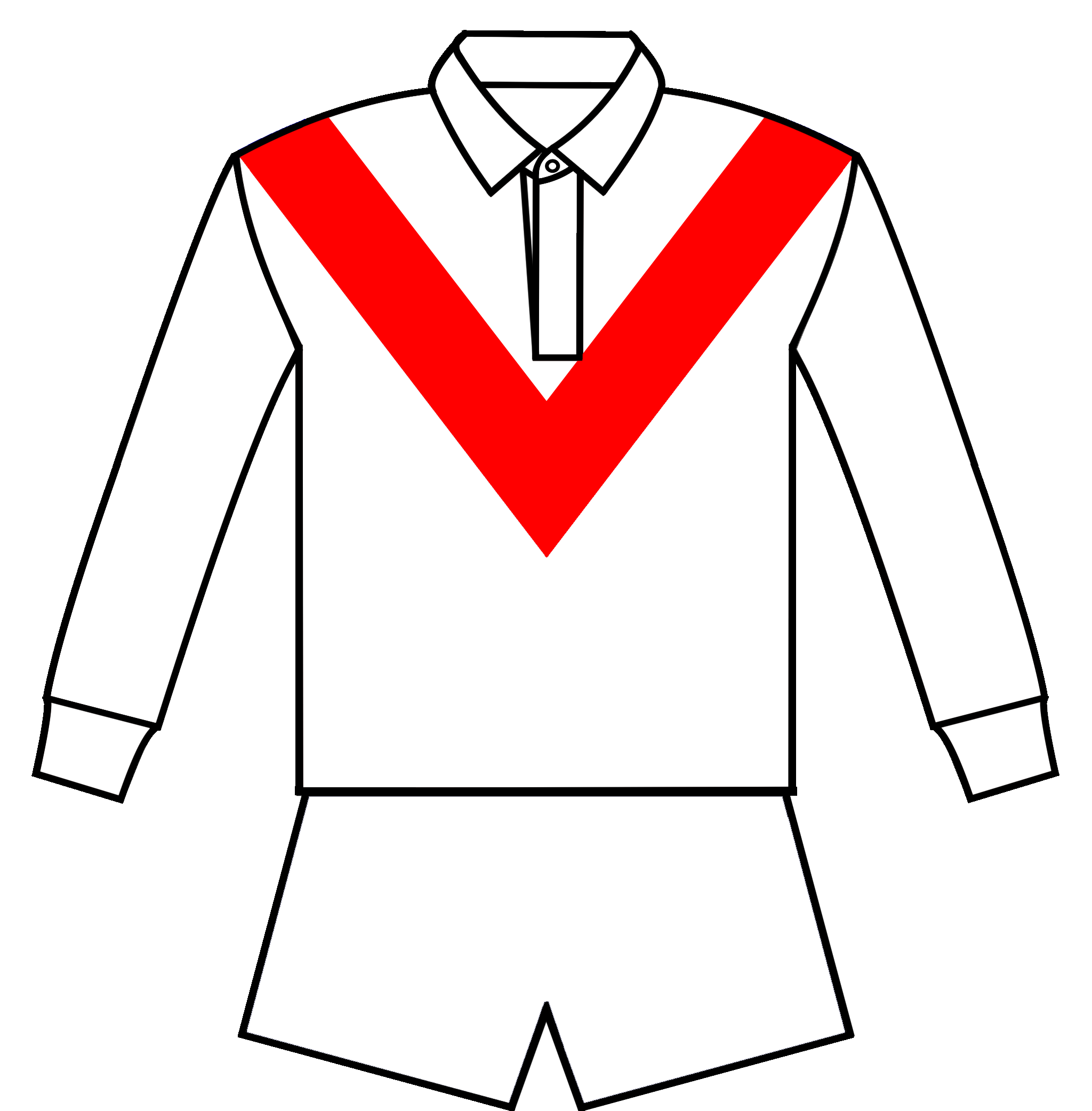
St. George 33rd season Ground: Jubilee Oval; Coach: Norm Tipping; Captain: Ken Kearney

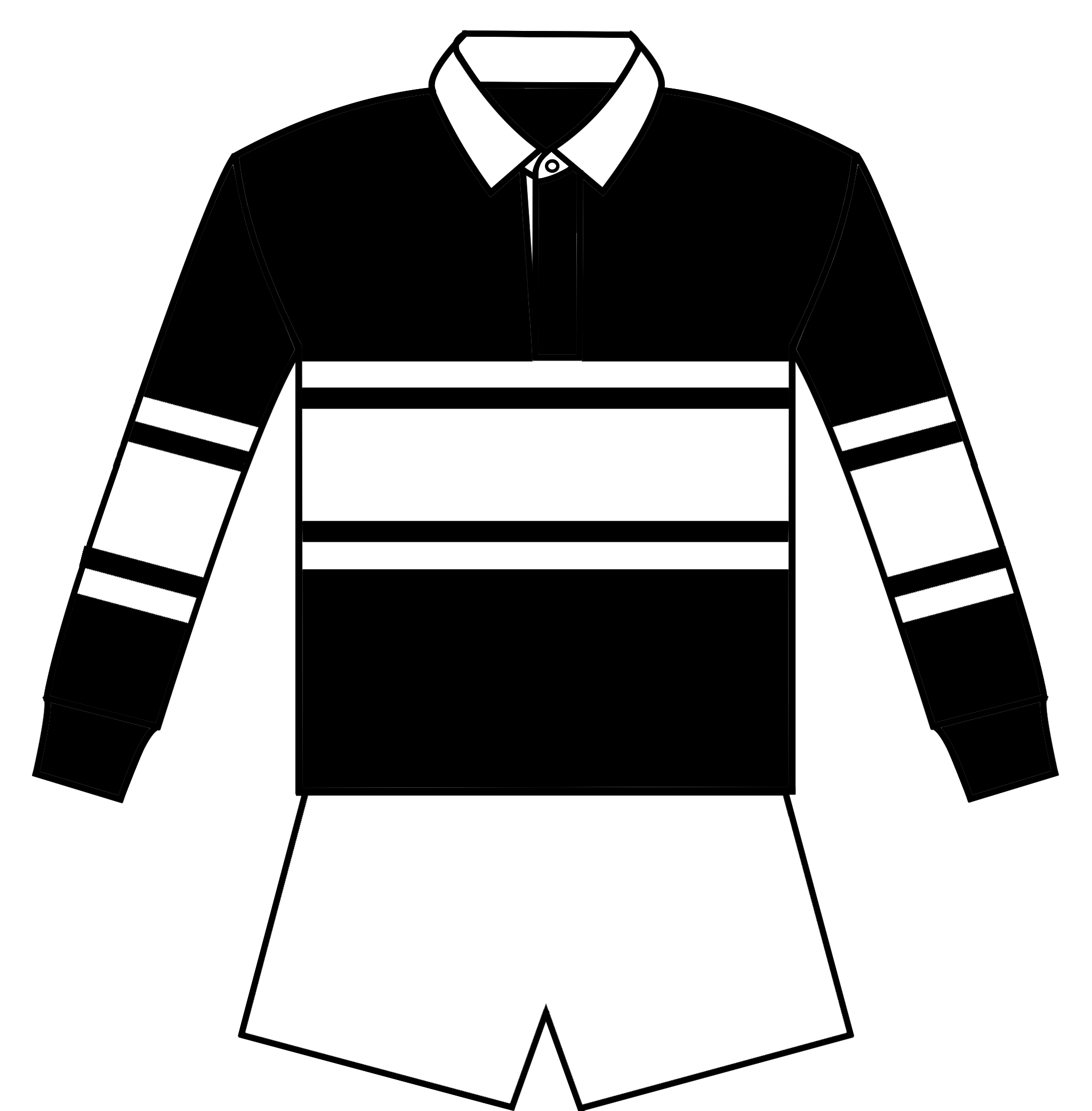
Western Suburbs 46th season Ground: Pratten Park; Captain-Coach: Peter McLean

== Ladder ==
	Team	Pld	W	D	L	PF	PA	PD	Pts
1	South Sydney	18	11	1	6	384	278	+106	23
2	St. George	18	11	0	7	313	289	+24	22
3	North Sydney	18	10	1	7	421	283	+138	21
4	Eastern Suburbs	18	10	1	7	330	310	+20	21
5	Newtown	18	9	2	7	292	268	+24	20
6	Canterbury	18	9	2	7	252	291	-39	20
7	Parramatta	18	8	1	9	271	291	-20	17
8	Balmain	18	7	0	11	313	377	-64	14
9	Manly	18	6	0	12	294	393	-99	12
10	Western Suburbs	18	5	0	13	287	377	-90	10

== Finals ==
Home	Score	Away	Match Information
Home	Score	Away	Date and Time	Venue	Referee	Crowd
Semifinals
South Sydney	5–4	North Sydney	29 August 1953	Sydney Cricket Ground	Jack O'Brien	30,392
St. George	25–7	Eastern Suburbs	5 September 1953	Sydney Cricket Ground	Darcy Lawler	37,753
Final
South Sydney	31–12	St. George	12 September 1953	Sydney Cricket Ground	Darcy Lawler	44,581

=== Chart ===
Semi-finals
1	Souths	5
3	Norths	4
2	St George	25
4	Easts	7

Final
Souths	31
St George	12

Grand final
MP	Souths	X
Souths	X

=== Final ===
South Sydney	Position	St. George
13. Clive Churchill	FB	3. Noel Pidding
12. Ian Moir	WG	15. Kevin Hole
18. Martin Gallagher	CE	5. Tommy Ryan
14. Kevin Woolfe	CE	44. Merv Lees
11. Frank Threlfo	WG	2. Ross Kite
21. John Dougherty	FE	4. Allan Staunton
22. Greg Hawick	HB	20. Peter Bracken
1. Denis Donoghue	PR	39. Kevin Brown
2. Ernie Hammerton	HK	12. Ken Kearney (c)
5. Jim Richards	PR	11. Bob Bower
41. Bob Moon	SR	10. Barry Passfield
4. Jack Rayner (Ca./Co.)	SR	9. Norm Provan
6. Les Cowie	LK	8. Billy Wilson
	Coach	Norm Tipping

To win the 1953 premiership St George would need to beat minor premiers Souths in both a final and a Grand final, emulating the feats of the Dragons of 1949 from which team only Noel Pidding was still playing. A crowd of 44,581 were at the Sydney Cricket Ground to see the first phase of this attempt.

Souths opened the scoring with a penalty goal in the ninth minute kicked by Clive Churchill from 40 yards. The Dragons threatened Souths' line continuously in the next stanza but bombed three tries and then lost some momentum in the 14 minutes before half-time during the absence of centre Merv Lees while he was off the field having stitches to his lip after driving a tooth through it. Souths scored 13 points in this period. Ian Moir capitalised on a spillage of the ball by Pidding behind his own line after a heavy tackle, Churchill then featured when he firstly sent Threlfo in and then set up Moir for his second try. The score at half time was 15–0.

Early in the second half Pidding kicked a penalty and a few minutes later Wilson and Gallagher were sent off for fighting. With Wilson gone Rabbitoh hard-men Rayner and Donoghue then took control and four Souths tries flowed to Woolfe, Dougherty, Hammerton and Moir’s third. Two late Dragons’ tries to Brown and Lees made no difference and South Sydney powered to their fourteenth premiership.

South Sydney Rabbitohs 31
Tries: Moir (3), Woolfe, Threlfo, Dougherty, Hammerton
Goals: Dougherty (4), Churchill (1)

St George Dragons 12
Tries: Lees, Brown
Goals: Pidding (3)

== Player statistics ==
The following statistics are as of the conclusion of Round 18.

Top 5 point scorers

Points	Player	Tries	Goals	Field Goals
152	Ron Rowles	8	64	0
114	Bob Hobbs	2	54	0
99	Noel Pidding	3	45	0
91	Norm Stewart	1	44	0
88	Gordon Clifford	0	44	0

Top 5 try scorers

Tries	Player
20	Ian Moir
18	Horrie Toole
18	Ray Preston
14	Barry Stenhouse
13	Peter O'Brien

Top 5 goal scorers

Goals	Player
64	Ron Rowles
54	Bob Hobbs
45	Noel Pidding
44	Norm Stewart
44	Gordon Clifford
