= Kurri Kurri aluminium smelter =

Coordinates: 32°47′26″S 151°28′51″E

- Kurri Kurri Aluminium Smelter, circa 70s, Pot Line 1
- Interactive map of the Kurri Kurri aluminium smelter area

General information
- Status: Demolished
- Type: Aluminium smelter
- Location: Kurri Kurri, Australia
- Opened: 14 November 1969
- Closed: October 2012
- Demolished: 2016-2020
- Owner: Norsk Hydro

Design and construction
- Developer: Alcan

The Kurri Kurri aluminium smelter was located in Kurri Kurri, Australia and operated from 1969 until 2012. Developed by Alcan Australia Limited, the smelter experienced a change of ownership three times during its operations. Through gradual expansion, the smelter increased its production capacity from 30,000 tonnes per year (t/y) to 180,000 t/y of aluminium by the 1990s. The Kurri Kurri Smelter was engaged in operations in four areas; potlines for the melting of alumina, a cast house for casting of molten metal, a carbon plant for baking anodes, and anode plants for the manufacturing of carbon anodes.

Environmental concerns were raised over the smelter's production and expansion, resulting in the establishment of emissions reduction technologies and ongoing environmental monitoring over the lifetime of the smelter. Challenging industrial relations have been documented throughout the smelter's operation, mainly during the 1990s and 2000s due to changing management and structure of the plant. The smelter's official closure in 2014 has since been followed by ongoing developments to remediate the land for its use for residential, industrial and conservation reasons. The land and some remaining power infrastructure from the smelter was sold in 2020 to developers.

The smelter was part of the local culture and identity of Kurri Kurri and its closure resulted in the direct loss of hundreds of jobs and the indirect loss of thousands of jobs.

== Background ==
=== Early production ===
Construction of the Kurri Kurri smelter commenced in 1967, with it being opened on 14 November 1969 by Governor-General Paul Hasluck. The smelter was built on undeveloped agricultural land with the surrounding land gradually being purchased by the smelter to comply with planning approval of the construction. The Australian government's decision in 1963 to ban metal imports into Australia led to the commissioning of the Kurri Kurri Smelter. Kurri Kurri was proposed as the smelter's location due to its close proximity to port facilities in Newcastle and availability of labour.

During early production, the smelter had a production capacity of 30,000 (t/y) of aluminium metal. The first potline was progressively expanded to a capacity of 45,000 t/y and consisted of 120 side worked prebake cells. A potline is a series of pots or electrolytic cells where alumina is melted with molten cryolite. These pots are situated in a long building or spread across several buildings. In 1977 approval was given to the smelter to expand production to a second potline, expanding smelting capacity to 90,000 t/y of aluminium and adding 120 centre-worked prebake cells with supporting facilities. Supporting facilities included casting and anode manufacturing facilities and storage facilities for raw materials. This Line II expansion also involved the fitting of dry scrubbers to remove fluoride from waste gases. In 1981 a third potline was approved, increasing production capacity to 135,000 t/y of aluminium and adding another 120 centre-worked prebake cells with anode manufacturing capabilities, pollution controls and support facilities. This was the final stage of the smelter's expansion, generating its greatest capacity and efficiency. This third potline reached full production capacity in 1986, increasing the smelter's annual production capacity to 150,000 tonnes of aluminium.

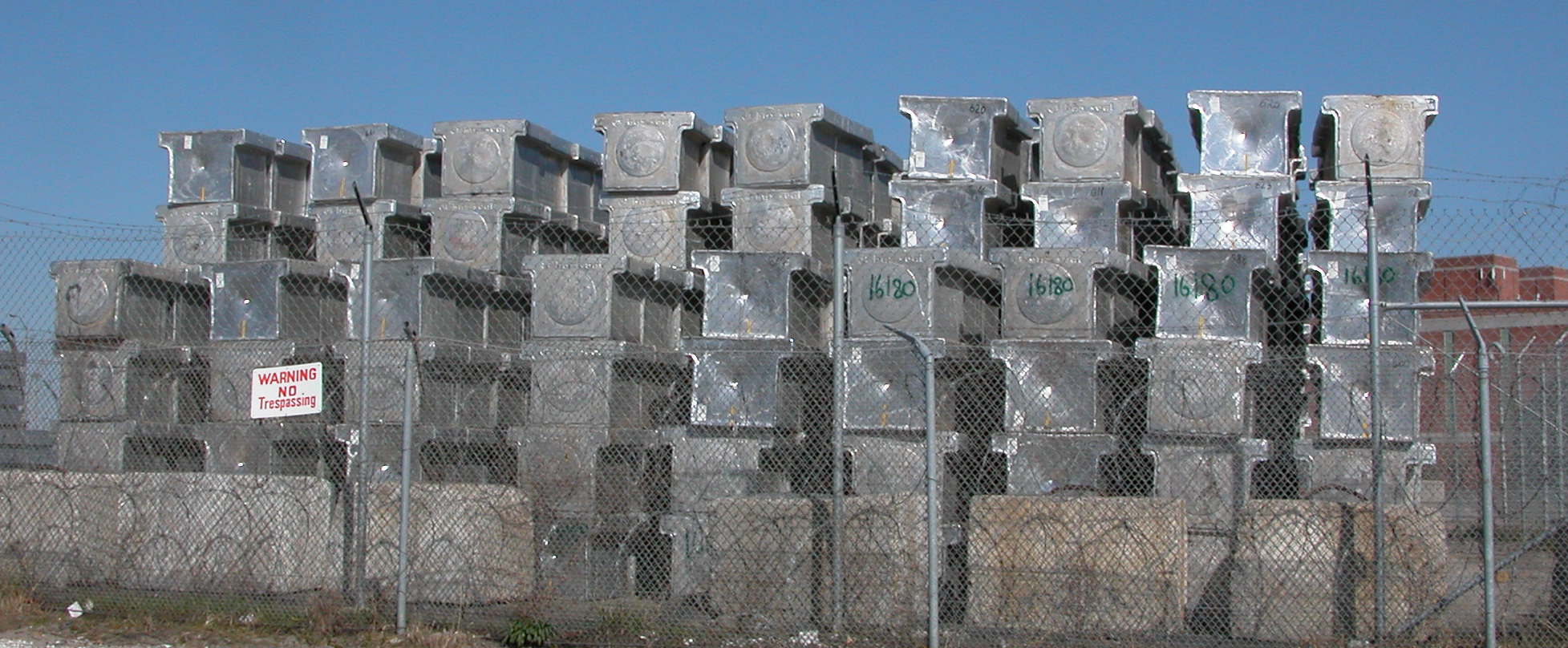
Example of aluminium ingots

The Kurri Smelter produced various types of ingots for use in building materials used in roofs, doors and windows, and for use in tubing and cables. At full capacity the smelter required approximately 16 megawatt-hours of electricity to produce one tonne of aluminium.

=== Composition ===
The smelter was originally owned by Alcan Australia limited, subsidiary to the Canadian-based company Alcan Aluminium limited. In 1981 the smelter was owned 70% by Alcan Aluminium Limited and 30% by other Australian Financial institutions. In 1995 the smelter transitioned to being wholly Australian owned as Capral Aluminium. This was followed by purchase of the smelter in 2000 by VAW, a German aluminium company, as Capral was unable to support further production by the smelter. Some commentators believe this sale was a result of Capral's inability to secure cheap electricity to service the smelter. During the turn of the century, Kurri Kurri's Plant was one of six aluminium smelters in Australia, making up 10% of domestic production and employing 2500 people across all operations.

The smelter used Alcan end-to-end prebake technology.

=== 21st century ===
VAW indicated in March 2001 of its plans to expand to a fourth potline, increasing capacity per annum by 100,000 tonnes of aluminium. Additionally, VAW announced its intention to spend $55 million to improve technical inefficiencies over a 3-year period. Norsk Hydro inherited the smelter after purchasing VAW Aluminium in 2002.

In 2008, 5% of Kurri Kurri's population was employed by Norsk Hydro.

== Environmental impacts ==
=== 1969–2000 ===
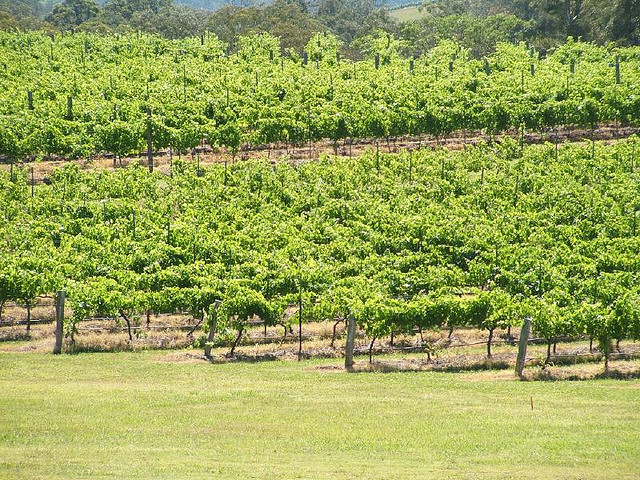
Vineyard in the Hunter Valley

The smelter's development coincided with the establishment of several vineyards 15 km to the west of the Plant. As a result of concern among vintners, a foliage monitoring program was developed to run over 30 growing seasons. Additionally, concern over foliage damage to native vegetation led to the monitoring of nearby scrub, sclerophyll forest, woodland and swamp forest. Both monitoring programs found the smelter to have a negligible effect on vegetation and crops. Other Environmental assessments conducted during the 1980s include the 1981 Environmental Impact Assessment by the Department of Environment and Planning. This assessment found Line I of the smelter to produce higher emissions compared to Line II due to a lack of hooding efficiencies. Hooding efficiency refers to the percentage of fumes captured from aluminium smelting and should be at least 95% for prebaked pots. The assessment also found that for every tonne of aluminium produced, 15 kg of fluoride is emitted as a by-product, accumulating to 675 tonnes of fluoride emissions a year. In another assessment, the smelter was found to deposit the majority of fluoride pollution to the north of the plant towards Wentworth Swamp near Maitland, through both aerial and waterway transportation. Between the years 1969 and 1993, spent potliner was deposited in an area east of the plant known as "Mount Alcan". From 1993 onward this waste material was stored in sheds.

=== 2000–present ===
With growing concerns about climate change and the Australian government's UNFCCC commitments, the Kurri Kurri Aluminium Smelter, under Norsk Hydro, improved its environmental performance. As of 2009, the smelter had reduced its emissions intensity by 75% and electricity intensity by 92% compared to 1990s levels.

Between 2001 and 2006 spent potliner began being recycled by on-site contractor Regain Services. Following the smelter's closure this recycling continues to take place at nearby Tomago aluminium smelter and is estimated to finish in between two and three years.

With the introduction of more emissions reductions policies by the Australian Government, the smelter was subject to partial exemptions as a result of its trade exposure. Under the 2010 Renewable Energy Target, the smelter received partial exemptions and was intended to be given extensive free permits with the Carbon Pollution Reduction Scheme. As a result of this, climate change protestors disrupted production at Kurri Kurri to express their anger about the proposed permits in 2009.

== Industrial relations ==
Employees at the Kurri Kurri Aluminium Smelter have been mainly represented by the Federated Ironworkers Association (FIA), later being the Australian Workers' Union (AWU). The period of economic liberalisation in the 1990s saw the smelter undergo several changes to cope with increased competition and efficiency, including a reduction in job positions and a restructuring of management. This began a period of challenging relations between a new management focused on cost reduction and employees and their unions with reluctance to change. From 1988 to 2006 Hydro reduced the number of employees at the smelter from 892 to 473 people. The purchase of Capral by VAW aluminium in 2000 led to the smelter Upgrade and Retro-Fit (SURF) Project which aimed at improving equipment and process deficiencies within the smelter. Despite greater investments into the Plant aimed at increasing production and costing almost $127 million, relations continued to deteriorate as VAW, and its successor Hydro, maintained a cost-reductions approach to management which included significant job cuts.

Significant conflict was reported in the smelter's potrooms where proposed cuts in manning of operations came before the Australian Industrial Relations Commission and discontent was felt towards the potroom manager. Between 2000 and 2005 a considerable amount of collective industrial action led to the smelter's management seeking arbitration tribunals. In June 2005, an audit team from Oslo visited the smelter to assess the situation. In November 2005 a ‘Rescue Team’ was sent from Oslo and on 27 November the potroom manager was replaced. The smelter's new potroom manager, Knut Austreid, facilitated an increase in manning and training of new technologies and equipment.

In November 2010, workers alongside union members protested outside the smelter against the state government's engagement with the smelter's power supply. This engagement involved the state government advising the smelter's energy provider, Delta Electricity, not to sign a ten-year contract extension with the smelter. The protest involved the Australian Worker's Union secretary in Newcastle, the Cessnock MP and head of the smelter.

== Closure, demolition and remediation ==
Norsk Hydro announced the smelter's closure on 5 June 2012, citing weak aluminium prices, a strong Australian dollar and an uncertain economic outlook for the closure. It stopped producing primary metal in September 2012 and casting house products in October 2012. The smelter's permanent closure occurred in May 2014. Following the closure, the smelter was engaged in an array of environmental impact assessments aimed at facilitating the remediation of contaminated land. Managing director of Norsk Hydro, Richard Brown, estimates that the cost of demolition and remediation of the site will be more than $100 million in addition to future environmental costs.

Site remediation work commenced in 2016 with an estimated 2020 completion date. Stage 1 of demolition of the Aluminium Smelter was undertaken by CMA contracting and began in May 2017. The demolition included removal of all three potlines, asbestos waste elimination and recycling of waste materials. Stage 2 of demolition was approved in May 2018 and involves the demolition of infrastructure below ground. The smelter's distinctive stacks were demolished in May 2019. An action camera positioned close to the smelter to capture the falling smokestacks was flung 40 metres due to the impact of the stacks hitting the ground.

In August 2018 Hydro announced sale of the smelter to Flow Systems, a private water and power company which supplies water to nearby suburbs. The deal was part of Hydro's $150 million ‘Regrowth Kurri Kurri Project’. However, the sale was revoked when Flow Systems went into voluntary administration a few months after buying the Kurri Smelter.

The 2,000-hectare (7.7 sq mi) site is being designated for 65% conservation purposes, 10% residential and employment purposes and 15% for rural land. In 2020 the smelter site was sold to Stevens Group and McCloy Group as a combined property and residential land development business entity. The partnership is planning on developing the site into a new suburb called Loxford Waters with 2000 new homes with added industrial estates and a business park. These increases in housing will be met with environmental buffer zones. Use of the site is seen as important for economic recovery for Kurri Kurri following the smelter's closure. Plans are also to use the existing power infrastructure from the smelter to establish power generation through solar power or a gas peaking plant for the industrial estate.

The smelter's closure resulted in over 600 direct employees losing their job. In May 2021, it was announced that the smelter site would be redeveloped as the 660 MW Kurri Kurri gas Power Station, which started testing in March 2025.

== Cultural and economic significance ==
The Kurri Kurri Aluminium Smelter was a significant employer of the region and contributed to the identity and culture of the town. To celebrate the Plant's 40th anniversary, Hydro gifted a giant kookaburra sculpture to the town on 14 December 2009. The Kurri Kurri Smelter Reunion Committee was formed in 2013 to reunite former workers and share their memories of the smelter's operation. In November 2019 the committee held their seventh annual reunion involving 300 ex-workers.

The smelter totalled economic inflows to the town of Kurri Kurri at over $80 million a year, predominantly through salaries and use of local services.
