= Weston, New South Wales =

Weston
- Town
- Coordinates: 32°48′54″S 151°27′4″E
- Country: Australia
- State: New South Wales
- Region: Hunter
- City: Cessnock
- LGA: City of Cessnock
- Location: 148 km (92 mi) N of Sydney; 11 km (6.8 mi) ENE of Cessnock; 59 km (37 mi) W of Newcastle

Government
  - State electorate: Cessnock
  - Federal divisions: Hunter; Paterson

Area (Note: Based on 1:100000 map 9132 CESSNOCK.)
  - Total: 5.6 km^{2} (2.2 sq mi)
- Elevation: 20 m (66 ft)

Population
  - Total: 4,088 (SAL 2021)
  - Density: 573.6/km^{2} (1,486/sq mi)
- Time zone: UTC+10 (AEST)
  - Summer (DST): UTC+11 (AEDT)
- Postcode: 2326
- County: Northumberland
- Parish: Heddon
- Mean max temp: 24.5 °C (76.1 °F)
- Mean min temp: 11.3 °C (52.3 °F)
- Annual rainfall: 766.9 mm (30.19 in)
Localities around Weston
Sawyers Gully	Sawyers Gully	Loxford
Abermain	Weston	Kurri Kurri
Abermain	Abermain	Pelaw Main

Weston is a town in the Hunter Region of New South Wales, Australia. It is part of the City of Cessnock local government area, located approximately 11 km (7 mi) from Cessnock. At the 2021 census it recorded a population of 4,088.

Weston's post office opened on 25 January 1904.

== Education ==
=== Early Childhood ===
- Weston Community Pre-School
- Weston Public Pre-School (Approx. 2027)

=== Primary School ===
- Weston Public School
