= Spent potlining =

Waste material generated in aluminium smelting

Spent Potlining (SPL) is a waste material generated in the primary aluminium smelting industry. Spent Potlining is also known as Spent Potliner and Spent Cell Liner.

Primary aluminium smelting is the process of extracting aluminium from aluminium oxide (also known as alumina). The process takes place in electrolytic cells that are known as pots. The pots are made up of steel shells with two linings, an outer insulating or refractory lining and an inner carbon lining that acts as the cathode of the electrolytic cell. During the operation of the cell, substances, including aluminium and fluorides, are absorbed into the cell lining. After some years of operation, the pot lining fails and is removed. The removed material is spent potlining (SPL). SPL was listed by the United States Environmental Protection Agency in 1988 as a hazardous waste. Hazardous properties of SPL are:

- Toxic fluoride and cyanide compounds that are leachable in water
- Corrosive - exhibiting high pH due to alkali metals and oxides
- Reactive with water - producing inflammable, toxic and explosive gases.

The toxic, corrosive and reactive nature of SPL means that particular care must be taken in its handling, transportation and storage. SPL from aluminium reduction cell cathodes is becoming one of the aluminium industry's major environmental concerns. On the other hand, it also represents a major recovery potential because of its fluoride and energy content.

Most SPL is currently stored at the aluminium smelter sites or placed in landfills. Dissolved fluorides and cyanides from SPL that are placed in landfills, along with other leachates may have environmental impacts. Environmentally safe storage methods include secure landfills or permanent storage buildings. However, many of the environmentally safe solutions are expensive and may develop unforeseen problems in the future.

== Background ==
Production of primary aluminium metal with the Hall–Héroult process involves the electrolytic reduction of alumina in cells or pots. The electrolyte is made up of molten cryolite and other additives. The electrolyte is contained in a carbon and refractory lining in a steel potshell. The pots typically have a life of 2 to 6 years. Eventually the cell fails and the potlining (SPL) is removed and replaced. The SPL generated is listed by various environmental bodies as hazardous waste. Due to the concentrations of fluorides and cyanides in spent potlining, and the tendency to leach in contact with water, the US Environmental Protection Agency (USEPA) listed the materials on 13 September 1988 (53 Fed. Reg. 35412) as a hazardous waste (K088) under 40 C.F.R., Part 261, Subpart D. International shipment of SPL is subject to the protocols of the Basel Convention on the Transboundary Movement of Hazardous Wastes and Their Disposal. As the environmental regulation agencies in an increasing number of countries define SPL as a hazardous material, the disposal costs can easily run to more than $1000 per tonne SPL. World production of primary aluminium was 67 million tonnes in 2021. The world's aluminium smelters also produce about 1.6 million tonnes of toxic SPL waste. Past industry practice has been to landfill this waste. This must change if the aluminium industry wants to claim a reasonable degree of sustainability and environmentally tolerable emissions. Landfill of unreacted SPL is considered a practice of the past.

== Chemical Properties of SPL ==
There is variation in composition of SPL depending on such factors as the type of aluminium smelting technology used, the initial components of the cell lining and dismantling procedures. Indicative composition of SPL for three different technologies is shown in the following table.

Spent Potlining Composition for Different Smelting Technologies
Component	Technology Type A	Technology Type B	Söderberg Technology	Major Phases
Fluorides (wt.%)	10.9	15.5	18.0	Na_{3}AlF_{6}, NaF, CaF_{2}
Cyanides (ppm)	680	4480	1040	NaCN, NaFe(CN)_{6}
Aluminium total (wt%)	13.6	11.0	12.5	Al_{2}O_{3}, NaAl_{11}O_{17}
Carbon (wt%.)	50.2	45.5	38.4	Graphite
Sodium (wt.%)	12.5	16.3	14.3	Na_{3}AlF_{6}, Naf
Aluminium Metal (wt.%)	1.0	1.0	1.9	Metal
Calcium (wt.%)	1.3	2.4	2.4	CaF_{2}
Iron (wt.%)	2.9	3.1	4.3	Fe_{2}O_{3}
Lithium	0.03	0.03	0.6	Li_{3}AlF_{6}, LiF
Titanium (wt.%)	0.23	0.24	0.15	TiB_{2}
Magnesium (wt.%)	0.23	0.09	0.2	Example

SPL is hazardous due to:

- Toxicity from fluoride and cyanide compounds that are leachable in water
- Corrosive - exhibiting high pH due to alkali metals and oxides
- Reactive with water in a way that produces inflammable, toxic and explosive gases.

An example of the potential consequences of SPL reaction with water is the death of two workers and reported damage costs of $30 million due to an explosion of flammable gases from SPL in the hold of a cargo ship.

The leachable fluorides in SPL come from the cryolite (Na_{3}AlF_{6}) and sodium fluoride (NaF) that are used as a flux in the smelting process.

Cyanide compounds form in the pot lining when nitrogen from air reacts with other substances. For example, nitrogen reacting with sodium and carbon according to the equation -

1.5N_{2} + 3Na + 3C → 3NaCN.

Aluminium carbide forms in the potlining from the reaction of aluminium and carbon according to the equation –

4Al + 3C → Al_{4}C_{3}.

Aluminium nitride forms from a number of reactions including the reaction of cryolite with nitrogen and sodium according to the equation -

Na_{3}AlF_{6} + 0.5N_{2} + 3Na → AlN + 6NaF

Gases are generated from reactions of water with compounds such as un-oxidised aluminium, un-oxidised sodium metal, aluminium carbide and aluminium nitride. Typical gases from the reaction of SPL with water are:

- Hydrogen from aluminium and water – 2Al + 3H_{2}0 → 3H_{2} + Al_{2}O_{3}
- Hydrogen from sodium metal and water – 2Na + 2H_{2}0 → H_{2} + 2NaOH
- Methane from aluminium carbide and water - Al_{4}C_{3} + 6H_{2}0 → 3CH_{4} + 2Al_{2}O_{3}
- Ammonia from aluminium nitride and water – 2AlN + 3H_{2}0 → 2NH_{3} + Al_{2}O_{3}n

== Toxicity of SPL ==
A number of research studies included biological tests to evaluate the toxicity of SPL on plants and humans. Aluminium, cyanide and fluoride salts were identified as the major toxic agents in SPL. The genotoxic potential of SPL and its main chemical components was evaluated on vegetal and human cells. Observed effects on vegetal cells included reduction in mitotic index and an increase in the frequency of chromosome alterations. Fluoride was the main genotoxic component for human leukocytes.

The observed effects induced by SPL suggest its mutagenic potential on plant and animal cells, confirming its noxiousness to the environment and human beings.

The studies consistently recommend that handling measures and appropriate disposal of SPL are extremely important and indispensable to avoid its dispersion to the environment and that the storage and disposal of SPL should be supervised closely in order to reduce the risk.

== Issues with Landfilling SPL ==
Past practices for dealing with Spent Potlining (SPL) include dumping it in rivers or in the sea or storing it in open dumps or landfilling. These methods are not environmentally acceptable because of the leachability of cyanides and fluorides. More recently SPL has been stored in secure landfills where it is placed on an impermeable base and covered with an impermeable cap. The amount of detailed information available on the quality of percolate from existing SPL landfills is very limited.

A particular problem with SPL in landfills is the long-term liabilities that result from limited effective life of landfills based on current technology when compared with the long-lived contaminating properties of SPL.

Lee and Jones-Lee describe the evolution and technical aspects of “dry-tomb” landfilling and why they consider it a seriously flawed technology citing problems such as:

- eventual failure of composite liner systems
- failure of cover systems to prevent ingress of water
- low probability of ground water monitoring systems to detect polluted leachate
- inadequate post closure funding and management arrangements.

A 2004 study of a landfill containing SPL located in North America identified four chemical species as priority contaminants: cyanide, fluoride, iron and aluminium. Life-cycle assessment and ground water transport modelling were used to provide an understanding of the situation identifying environmental issues and significant ecotoxilogical potential impacts. The study observed that, while assumptions that the confinement of soil and waste was assumed to be perfect, in fact these sites could themselves become sources of contamination. The study states that the most advantageous option is the total destruction of the SPL fraction if concerns about the quality of long term confinement are considered. The major objection to the sealed type of disposal is that it will need to be monitored indefinitely. There is, therefore, a real need to find safe, acceptable alternative ways to landfill disposal.

SPL was dumped by previous owners in an unlined waste repository at the Kurri Kurri smelter in Australia resulting in contamination of the local groundwater aquifer with high levels of fluoride, cyanide, sodium sulphate and chloride.

An Interim Action conducted under Agreed Order No. DE-5698 between the Port of Tacoma and the Washington State Department of Ecology addresses the removal, through excavation and offsite disposal, of SPL zone material and associated contaminated soil at an old aluminium smelter site. The background to this situation is that from 1941 to 1947, the US Department of Defense built and operated an aluminum smelter at the Site. In 1947, Kaiser Aluminum & Chemical Corporation (Kaiser Aluminum) purchased the Site and operated the aluminum production facility until 2001. In 2002, Kaiser Aluminum closed the plant and, in 2003, the Port of Tacoma purchased the smelter property from Kaiser Aluminum for redevelopment.

== SPL Treatment Options ==
A number of alternatives have been proposed for treatment of SPL. The alternatives can be classified as follows:

- disposal techniques where all or part of the SPL is destroyed or utilized by another industry including:
  - combustion for power generation
  - slag additives in iron and steel industry
  - fuel and mineral supplement in cement manufacture
  - red brick industry
  - conversion to inert landfill materials
- recovery or recycling techniques where some of the SPL can be recovered for use in primary aluminium smelting:
  - fluoride recovery from leaching processes
  - pyrohydrolysis
  - pyrosulfolysis
  - silicopyrohydrolysis
  - graphite recovery
  - cathode carbon additives
  - anode carbon additives
  - selective recovery of aluminium.

Recycling through other industries is an attractive and proven option; however, classification of SPL as a hazardous waste has greatly discouraged other industries from utilizing SPL, due to the burdensome and expensive environmental regulations. The Arkansas Pollution Control and Ecology Commission noted that treated SPL used to construct roads was recovered and placed in secure landfill.

== Bibliography ==
- Andrade-Vieira, L.F., Palmieri, M.J. & Davide, L. F. (2017), Effects of long exposure to spent potliner on seeds, root tips, and meristematic cells of Allium cepa, Environmental Monitoring and Assessment,189:489
- Arkansas Pollution Control and Ecology Commission (1998), Subject: Reynolds Metals Company Gum Springs and Hurricane Creek. Minute Order 98-28
- Holywell, G. and Breault, R. (2013). An Overview of Useful Methods to Treat, Recover or Recycle Spent Potlining. JOM, Vol. 65, No. 11.
- International Aluminium Institute (2010). Aluminium Industry Benchmarking 2010. International Aluminium Institute, New Zealand House, Haymarket, London, UK.
- Godin, J., Ménard, J-F., Hains, S., Deschênes, L. and Samson, R. (2004). Combined Use of Life Cycle Assessment and Groundwater Transport Modelling to Support Contaminated Site Management. Human and Ecological Risk Assessment, 10:1099-1116.
- Kumar, B., Sen, P. K. and Sing, G. (1992). Environmental Aspects of Spent Pot Linings from Aluminium Smelters and its Disposal – An Appraisal, Indian Journal of Environmental Protection, Vol. 12, No. 8.
- Palmieri, M. J., Andrade-Vieira, L. F., Trento, M. V. C., de Faria, Eleutério, M. W., Luber, J., Davide, L. C., & Marcussi, S. (2016). Cytogenotoxic effects of spent pot liner (SPL) and its main components on human leukocytes and meristematic cells of Allium cepa. Water, Air, and Soil Pollution, 227(5), 1–10.
- Palmieri, M. J., Andrade-Vieira, L. F., Campos, J. M. S., Gedraite, L. S.,&Davide, L. C. (2016). Cytotoxicity of spent pot liner on Allium cepa root tip cells: a comparative analysis in meristematic cell type on toxicity bioassays, Ecotoxicology and Environmental Safety, 133, 442–447.
- Palmieri, M. J., Luber, J., Andrade-Vieira, L. F., & Davide, L. C. (2014). Cytotoxic and phytotoxic effects of the main chemical components of spent pot-liner: a comparative approach, Mutation Research, 763, 30–35.
- Pawlek, R.P. (2012). Spent potlining: an update. In Suarez C. E. (Editor). Light Metals. The Minerals, Metals and Materials Society.
- Pong, T.K., Adrien, R.J., Besdia, J., O’Donnell, T.A. and Wood, D. G. (2000). Spent Potlining – A Hazardous Waste Made Safe. Transactions of the Institution of Chemical Engineers, Vol 78 Part B, May 2000
- Rustad, I., Kastensen, K.H. and Ødegård, K.E. (2000). Disposal Options for Spent Potlining. In Wolley, G.R., Goumans, J.J.J.M. and Wainwright, P. J. (Editors). Waste Materials in Construction.
- Shipowners Club (2010). Flammable Gas Causes Explosion, in Loss Prevention Case Studies, The Shipowners’ Protection Limited, 2010http://www.shipownersclub.com/media/433198/spl_ebook_021010.pdf
- Silveira, B.I., Danta, A.E., Blasquez, A.E. and Santos, R.K.P. (2002). Characterization of Inorganic Fraction of Spent Potliners: Evaluation of the Cyanides and Fluorides Content. Journal of Hazardous Materials B89 177–183.
- Sørlie, M. and Øye, H. A. (2010). Cathodes in Aluminium Electrolysis. Aluminium-Verlag Marketing and Kommunication, Düsseldorf.
- Turner, B.D., Binning, P.J. and Sloan, S.W. (2008). A Calcite Permeable Barrier for The Remediation of Fluoride from Spent Potliner (SPL) Contaminated Groundwater. Journal of Containment Hydrology 95 110-120
- Washington Department of Ecology (2013). Final SPL Area Interim Action Work Plan Former Kaiser Aluminum Property 3400 Taylor Way Tacoma, Washington. Prepared for Port of Tacoma, Tacoma Washington by Landau & Associates, Edmonds, WA. Retrieved from Department of Ecology website https://fortress.wa.gov/ecy/gsp/CleanupSiteDocuments.aspx?csid=2215
