= Barry Passfield =

Australian rugby league footballer

Personal information
- Full name: Barry Neil Passfield
- Born: 1932
- Died: 27 May 1985 (aged 52–53) Bonnet Bay, New South Wales

Playing information
- Position: Second-row
Club
Years	Team	Pld	T	G	FG	P
1952–53	St. George	29	9	0	0	27
- Source: Whiticker/Hudson

Barry Neil Passfield (1932–1985) was an Australian rugby league footballer who played in the 1950s.

Passfield was graded from the St. George Presidents Cup team from 1951. He played two seasons with the Dragons between 1952 and 1953.

Barry Passfield played in the 1953 Grand Final loss to South Sydney.

== Death ==
Passfield died on 27 May 1985, aged 53.
