= Mona Hessing =

Australian fibre artist and weaver

- Born: Mona Johnston; 1933; Kurri Kurri, NSW
- Died: 2001 (aged 67–68)
- Spouse: Leonard Hessing
- Awards: Churchill Fellowship 1973

Mona Hessing (1933–2001) was an Australian fibre artist and weaver. She was also known as Mona Johnston. Hessing has been described as having made a 'very significant contribution from the late 1960s into the 1980s to the development of weaving as monumental public sculpture'.

== Early life ==
Hessing was born at Kurri Kurri near Cessnock, NSW and attended the National Art School in Sydney from 1951–1956. She worked as a design consultant from 1953 to 1965. By 1962 she started to see herself as a fibre artist. Hessing lived in India during 1967–68, and undertook a large commission in New Delhi. The large tapestry gave her excellent experience in working on large textile works. Hessing use of different fibres and "off-loom" techniques were skills she acquired in India and stayed with her for the rest of her life.

== Art career ==
Hessing's subsequent work in Australia identified her innovative way of working with fibre, she had a particular impact in interior design and architecture and worked with prominent interior designers such as Marion Hall Best. She was adventurous in her choice of materials, and worked with little-used fibres such as silk, jute, sisal, wool and a number of synthetic fibres. She said in 1972: "The concept of a non-rigid, yielding, flexible form that grows and develops at each touch is tremendously exciting. It includes a subtle relationship of things within things and the final form that contains within itself countless co-ordinated events". Using a vivid colour palette, inspired by her experience with Indian textiles, she combined flat and textured knotted weaves in large tapestries that complemented the bold geometry and texture of Australian public architecture of the 1970s. Her smaller works were well-suited to the changes in domestic architecture, particularly those designed in the more open style of the 'Sydney School'.

By the late 1960s she was well-known as a fibre artist. Described as softly spoken and modest, Hessing cut a striking figure at her exhibition openings, looking 'more like a model than a weaver of wall hangings'.

For the 1967 exhibition at the Australian Design Centre, Sydney organised by the newly formed Craft Association of Australia, there was a noticeable shift by artist craftspeople to be less 'homespun' and more 'professional'. Hessing contributed 'gigantic, vivid floor rugs'.

In 1968, Hessing created a tapestry in graduating stripes of yellow and brown which was selected to be exhibited at the Stuttgart Craft Exhibition with other Australian artists ceramicist Milton Moon and painter Salvatore Zofrea. The Bulletin's art critic Elwyn Lyn described the work as 'anti banner' and as showing 'outstanding individuality'.

In 1971 Hessing was commissioned to create a large 'civic scaled' tapestry for the University of New South Wales. The result was Banner which weighed over a quarter of a tonne and was over 20 metres in length. Banner was created with hues of blue, gold and purple in handspun wool. Elywyn Lyn, writing again for The Bulletin commented that modern universities had too much concrete and the new auditorium 'needed' Mona Hessing's Banner for 'its impressive amalgam of monument and bomb shelter'. Also in 1971, Hessing showed at the Realities Craft Shop with Jutta Federson, Eva Hesse and William Tucker. Elywyn Lyn declared that 'the era of woven objects with positive personalities is upon us' and found Hessing's work 'symmetrical, but not neat and orderly'. He went on to describe her work in some detail, particularly the wall-dividers in quiet and faded neutral colours.

In 1973 Hessing was invited to exhibit with artist friend and ceramicist Marea Gazzard in 'Clay and Fibre' at the National Gallery of Victoria. This exhibition was considered to be important in the art versus craft debate as the artists were allocated a large space at the National Gallery of Victoria that would normally have been used for showing paintings and sculpture, 'thus expanding the notions of materials appropriate for creating high art'. The ceramic pots and fibre forms created had been shown earlier in the year at the Bonython Gallery in Sydney. Nancy Borlase of The Bulletin commented the work was able to 'transform the Bonython into something exotic' and she went so far as to further describe the Gallery space as having been 'transformed into a Bedouin encampment'. One particularly large installation, Links, consisted of jute forms creating an 'oasis of trees', while Chinook was like a 'tangled fringe of hair'. The exhibition had 'zest' and was an example of 'elevated craftsmanship'.

In 1974, when James Mollison of the National Gallery of Australia was caught up in the controversy surrounding the purchase of Blue Poles, an article in The Bulletin by journalist Patricia Rolfe examined some of the other purchases made that year and the amounts of money paid to commercial galleries. Bonython Gallery in Sydney, which was representing Hessing, received $4950 for Hessing's Woven Hanging Scoop in the craft category.

In 1990 Hessing moved to Tuross Head on the NSW South Coast to care for her mother, where she remained permanently. She began working and exhibiting more seriously again, showing the results at the Hidden Valley Gallery, Bodalla, NSW, at The Priory, Bingie, NSW and in late 2000 at the Canberra Museum and Gallery.

Hessing was instrumental in virtually reinventing weaving. The former craft had been limited by fine threads woven on a loom. Hessing, regarded as a master craftsman and an influential weaver, threw away convention and created monumental forms by hand, using a variety of innovating techniques that incorporated knotting, twisting and folding.

== Public collections (Australia) ==
- National Gallery of Victoria, Melbourne, Victoria
- National Gallery of Australia, Canberra, ACT
- Powerhouse Museum, Sydney, NSW
- Queensland Art Gallery, Brisbane, Queensland
- University of New South Wales, Sydney, NSW
- Orange Regional Gallery, Orange, NSW
- Ararat Gallery, Ararat, Victoria

== Public collections (International) ==
- Australian Embassy, Delhi, India
- Australian Embassy, Paris, France

== Commissions ==
- Wentworth Memorial Chapel, Vaucluse, NSW: 1967
- Menzies Hotel, Sydney, NSW: 1967
- Sir John Clancy Auditorium, University of New South Wales, 1971
- Sydney Masonic Centre, Sydney, NSW: 1979

== Legacy ==
After travelling and exhibiting overseas, Hessing settled in Tuross Head, NSW where she continued to exhibit locally and nationally. In 2003 Hessing donated her textile archive to the National Gallery of Australia. Her work continues to inspire fibre artists and in 2020 Hessing was the focus of Shimmering, an exhibition by a selection of artists from the Eurobodalla Fibre and Textile Artist Group (EFTAG) at the Basil Sellers Art Centre, Moruya, NSW.

== Oral History ==
Hessing was interviewed in 1972 by Hazel de Berg. The recording can be found at the National Library of Australia.
