= Marea Gazzard =

Australian sculptor, artist (1928–2013)

Marea Gazzard AM
- Portrait of Marea Gazzard, 1963, photograph by David Moore
- Born: Marea Medis; 2 June 1928; Sydney, Australia
- Died: 28 October 2013 (aged 85); Sydney, Australia
- Known for: Sculpture, ceramics
- Spouse: Donald Gazzard (m. 1950)

Marea Gazzard AM (2 June 1928 – 28 October 2013) was an Australian sculptor and ceramicist.

== Life and work ==
Born Marea Medis in Sydney, Australia, Gazzard studied ceramics at the East Sydney Technical College, now the National Art School, from 1953 to 1955. After travelling to Europe, Gazzard enrolled at the Central Saint Martins College of Art and Design, London where she studied from 1955 to 1959. During this period she became close to ceramicists Lucie Rie and Hans Coper. Returning to Sydney, Gazzard studied sculpture at the National Art School, with Lyndon Dadswell. In 1960, she opened a studio in Paddington, New South Wales, and in 1963 staged her first solo exhibition.

Gazzard had a significant exhibiting career, with some notable highlights. In 1973, Gazzard was invited to exhibit at the National Gallery of Victoria in the landmark exhibition 'Clay and Fibre' with Mona Hessing. In 1994, a survey of Gazzard's work was staged at the S. H. Ervin Gallery, Sydney, accompanied by the launch of a monograph by Christine France.

Major public commissions include 'Mingarri: The Little Olgas", which was installed in the Executive Court of Parliament House, Canberra in 1988. In addition, 'Bindu' (2004) was commissioned by the Athens Olympic Art Program for the Olympic Games in Greece.

Gazzard's work features in several museum collections, including the Art Gallery of Western Australia, National Gallery of Victoria, National Gallery of Australia, Newcastle Art Gallery. Her portrait by Judy Cassab is in the National Portrait Gallery, Australia.

In addition to her career as an artist, Gazzard was pivotal in the international Arts and Crafts movement, and, amongst other public positions, in 1980 she became the first elected president of the World Crafts Council.
