= Cliff Kelly =

Australian rugby league footballer

Personal information
- Full name: Clifford Cyril Kelly
- Born: 1917; Kurri Kurri, New South Wales
- Died: 23 July 1942 (aged 25); Tempe, New South Wales

Playing information
- Position: Second-row, Prop
Club
Years	Team	Pld	T	G	FG	P
1940–41	St. George	7	2	0	0	6

Cliff Kelly (1917 – 23 July 1942) was an Australian rugby league footballer who played in the 1940s.

== Career ==
Kelly came to St. George in 1940 from Kurri Kurri, New South Wales. He was a second-row forward who suffered recurring knee injuries that stifled his short career.

== Accidental death ==
In 1942, he was again playing good football in the reserve grade before an accident on a train killed him on 27 July 1942. The train was heading for Tempe railway station when he leaned out of the train and was immediately struck in the head by a passing train. He died at Tempe station while waiting for an ambulance.

The Annual St. George Club Cabaret night was held on 8 August 1942 at Rockdale Town Hall, and all proceeds on the night were donated to Kelly's wife Helen and young son.

== Funeral ==
A large funeral was held at Woronora Crematorium for Kelly, will all members of the St. George Dragons team attending.
