= Bob Bower =

Australian rugby league footballer

Personal information
- Full name: Robert John Thomas Bower
- Born: 8 June 1928 Abermain, New South Wales, Australia
- Died: 21 June 2012 (aged 84) Bankstown, New South Wales, New South Wales, Australia

Playing information
- Position: Prop
Club
Years	Team	Pld	T	G	FG	P
1950–53	St. George	71	9	0	0	27
Representative
Years	Team	Pld	T	G	FG	P
1949	New South Wales	2	0	0	0	0
1949	NSW Country	1	0	0	0	0

Robert Lloyd Bower (14 January 1925 – 14 December 2004) was an Australian rugby league footballer who played as a prop in the 1940s and 1950s. Originally from Kurri Kurri, New South Wales, he represented New South Wales and New South Wales Country in 1949 before joining St. George. Bower played 71 first-grade matches for St. George between 1950 and 1953, scoring nine tries, and appeared in the 1953 NSWRFL Grand Final.

== Playing career ==
Bower was originally from Kurri Kurri, New South Wales, and played as a prop. In 1949, he represented New South Wales and New South Wales Country.

He joined St. George in 1950 and played four seasons with the club. Bower made 71 first-grade appearances for St. George from 1950 to 1953, scoring nine tries. His final first-grade match was St. George's loss to South Sydney in the 1953 Grand Final, after which he returned to country football.
