= Reegan Tanner =

Australian rugby league footballer

Personal information
- Full name: Reegan Tanner
- Born: 27 September 1982 (age 44) Kurri Kurri, New South Wales, Australia
- Height: 185 cm (6 ft 1 in)
- Weight: 101 kg (223 lb; 15 st 13 lb)

Playing information
- Position: Lock, Second-row
Club
| Years | Team | Pld | T | G | FG | P |
|---|---|---|---|---|---|---|
| 2003–07 | Newcastle Knights | 83 | 3 | 0 | 0 | 12 |
- Source: As of 7 February 2019

Reegan Tanner (born 27 September 1982) is an Australian former professional rugby league footballer who played for the Newcastle Knights in the National Rugby League (NRL). Tanner made 83 appearances for the Knights from 2003 until 2007, primarily playing at lock.

== Playing career ==
Tanner was the only Knight to participate in every game during the 2005 season as the club finished last on the table claiming the wooden spoon. During the 2005 season, Tanner was one of twelve players fined for breaking team curfew and engaging in acts which brought the club into disrepute. Tanner was cut from the squad at the end of the 2007 season.

Tanner returned to his home town of Kurri Kurri where he played with the Kurri Bulldogs and was selected to represent Newcastle in the 2009 Regional Championships.
