= Kevin Hole =

Australian rugby league footballer

Personal information
- Full name: Kevin James Hole
- Born: 1 May 1933 (age 91); Sydney, New South Wales, Australia

Playing information
- Position: Wing
Club
Years	Team	Pld	T	G	FG	P
1951–57	St. George	50	47	0	0	141
1960–61	Parramatta	27	11	6	0	45
	Total	77	58	6	0	186
Representative
Years	Team	Pld	T	G	FG	P
1954	NSW City	1	0	0	0	0

Kevin James Hole is an Australian former rugby league footballer who played in the 1950s and 1960s.

== Playing career ==
A St. George junior, from Ramsgate, New South Wales, Hole was graded at St. George in 1951 age 18, playing in the Final of that year. He went on to play eight seasons with the Saints between 1951 and 1959 although his latter years were not played in first grade. Hole played wing in the 1953 Grand Final loss to South Sydney.

His best year was 1954, when he scored 20 tries in 23 matches for the Saints and he also represented New South Wales.

Kevin Hole was the son in law of the great Tom Killiby.

Hole retired after the 1961 season.
