= Kurri Kurri, New South Wales =

Kurri Kurri
- Town
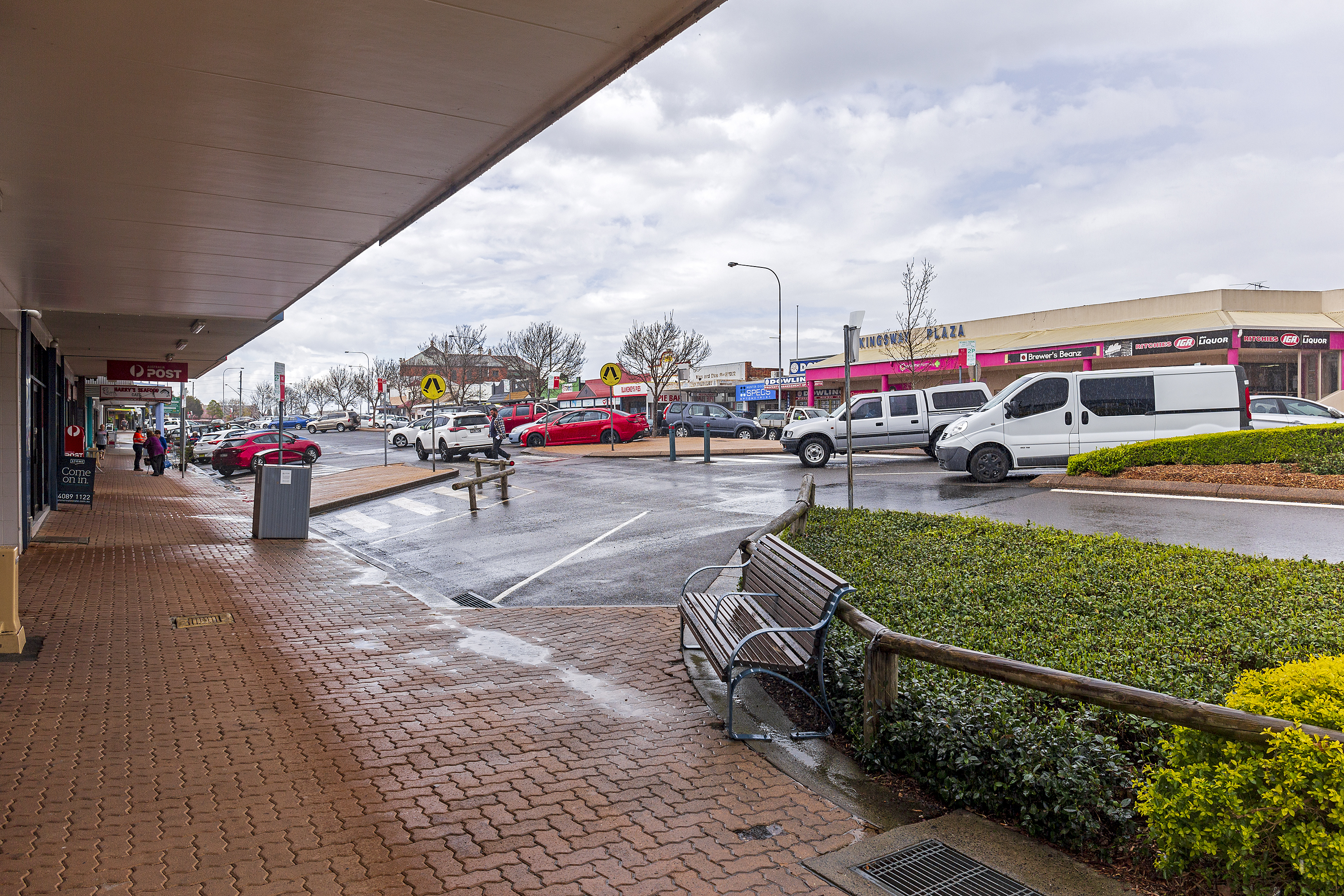
- Lang Street in Kurri Kurri

- Coordinates: 32°49′0″S 151°29′0″E
- Country: Australia
- State: New South Wales
- Region: Hunter
- City: City of Cessnock
- LGA: City of Cessnock
- Location: 34 km (21 mi) NW of Newcastle; 12.8 km (8.0 mi) SSW of Maitland; 149 km (93 mi) N of Sydney; 14 km (8.7 mi) E of Cessnock
- Established: 25 October 1902

Government
  - State electorate: Cessnock
  - Federal division: Hunter

Area^{Note2}
  - Total: 5.1 km^{2} (2.0 sq mi)
- Elevation^{Note1}: 40 m (130 ft)

Population
  - Total: 20,015 (UCL 2021)
  - Density: 1,106.7/km^{2} (2,866/sq mi)
- Time zone: UTC+10 (AEST)
  - Summer (DST): UTC+11 (AEDT)
- Postcode: 2327
- County: Northumberland
- Parish: Heddon
Localities around Kurri Kurri
| Weston, Loxford | Loxford | Heddon Greta |
| Weston | Kurri Kurri | Heddon Greta |
| Pelaw Main | Pelaw Main, Stanford Merthyr | Stanford Merthyr |

Kurri Kurri is a small town in the Hunter Region of New South Wales, Australia, in the Cessnock LGA. At the 2021 census, its population was 6,174. Kurri Kurri is the largest town in a group of towns and hamlets, including Stanford Merthyr, Pelaw Main, Weston, Abermain and Heddon Greta, called Kurri Kurri - Abermain by the ABS. Its estimated population was 20,631 at the 2021 census. The population of the Kurri Kurri built-up area (which excludes some rural areas from Kurri Kurri - Abermain) was 20,015 at the 2021 census.

== Foundation ==
The town was founded on 25 October 1902 by proclamation of the Governor of New South Wales, Admiral Sir Harry Rawson. The town was established to service the local Stanford Merthyr and Pelaw Main collieries and mining communities. The town was named Kurri Kurri possibly meaning "the very first" in Awabakal. It was the first town in Australia that was fully planned before anything was built. By the following January (1903) the first public auction of allotments took place, which had garnered months-long interest from miners, business people and speculators. Between 300 and 400 people were in attendance.

The local Progress Committee was responsible for clearing streets and supplying local services with State permission. The fire station and the hospital were built by locals with locally sourced money.

There is no history of any Aboriginal inhabitants of this area, other than a visit to the outskirts by a small group prior to most of the building of the town. A family with some Aboriginal background lived in Kurri Kurri in the 1930-40s. The first European landholder was Benjamin Blackburn who was granted 400 acres on the Banks of Wallis Creek at Richmond Vale.

The Kurri Kurri Hotel (1904) is one of several built during the era of mining prosperity in the early 20th century. It is an impressive three-story building featuring prominent verandas with cast-iron lacework. The Empire Tavern was also built during this period. Kurri Kurri has numerous small miners' cottages from the same period.

== Population ==
According to the 2021 census of Population, there were 6,174 people in Kurri Kurri, compared to 6,044 at the 2016 census.

- Aboriginal and Torres Strait Islander people made up 11.5% of the population.
- 88.5% of people were born in Australia. The next most common country of birth was England at 1.6%.
- 91.9% of people spoke only English at home.
- The most common responses for religion were No Religion 43.3%, Anglican 18.7% and Catholic 17.8%.

== Industry ==
=== Coal-mining ===
Mining at the South Maitland Coalfields began at East Greta in 1891, after an 1886 exploration by Sir Edgeworth David, a government geological surveyor, uncovered the potential of the Greta coal seam. More mines were opened in the early 1900s, supplanting those older pits at Newcastle where the Australian Agricultural Company enjoyed almost a monopoly. During this period there were a number of accidents including the death of six miners at the Stanford Merthyr Colliery in 1905, which is commemorated by a monument in the Kurri Kurri cemetery.

Richmond Main Colliery, also in the Kurri Kurri vicinity, was once the State's largest producer, at 3,400 tons per day, and which reputedly had the deepest shaft permitting access to two separate coal seams, the Scholey shaft, named after its founder, John Scholey. Following the serious slump in the coal industry Stanford Merthyr Colliery closed in 1957, Pelaw Main in 1962, and Richmond Main in 1967.

The power station at Richmond Main Colliery, which provided the electricity for Kurri Kurri and surrounding districts, remained in operation for some years after the mine's closure, until the entire district was attached to the National Grid.

=== Aluminium smelting ===
The Kurri Kurri aluminium smelter operated from 1969 to 2012, producing up to 180 kt (180,000 long tons; 200,000 short tons) of aluminium per year.

The 660 MW Snowy Hydro Hunter Gas Power Station is being built at the site, operating 2% of the year. It has a 70 TeraJoule line packing gas storage suitable for 10 hours, connecting to the Sydney–Newcastle Gas Pipeline which also serves the 660 MW Colongra Power Station.

== Railways ==
Kurri Kurri was served by the South Maitland Railway and originally had two passenger stations – one at Stanford Merthyr, and one on the main SMR line at North Kurri Kurri (opened in June 1904). A new red-brick station building and platform was built at Stanford Merthyr and opened in January 1909. It was renamed Kurri Kurri Station on 3 June 1922. However, with the closure of the SMR's branch line from Aberdare Junction to Stanford Merthyr, due to subsidence, North Kurri Kurri station was renamed Kurri Kurri in the mid-1930s. The station at Stanford Merthyr fell into disuse although the line from the colliery which passed through it was still in operation via the Richmond Vale Railway to Hexham. While passenger services on the South Maitland Railway have ceased, the line ceased use for coal haulage in 2020. The line ownership was changed in 2022 when Aurizon purchased 100% of shareholding in SMR. A new bridge was constructed to relocate the railway line to allow construction of the Hunter Expressway.

== Local government ==
Until the creation of the local government area known as the City of Cessnock, Kurri Kurri was the centre of the Shire of Kearsley, which included most of the rural areas and villages around the township of Cessnock and part of the western suburbs of Maitland.

== Civic Participation Events ==
=== Tidy Towns ===
In 1988 the town established a Tidy Town Committee under the stewardship of the Keep Australia Beautiful competition. The town achieved immediate success and in the space of 6 years took the best town in NSW in 1993 and was a finalist in the best town in Australia.

This was followed by the establishment of the Small Towns committee known as Towns with Heart.

=== Mulletfest ===
A pub-driven event called Mulletfest has been growing in Kurri Kurri for the past two years. The event celebrates the mullet haircut and other aspects of self-identified bogan culture (such as pub rock music). The event has been well received by locals and attracts attendees from around the country.

=== Nostalgia Festival ===
Each year Kurri Kurri hosts a 1950s/1960s inspired Nostalgia Festival featuring rock 'n' roll dancing, hot rod and bike shows.

== Education ==
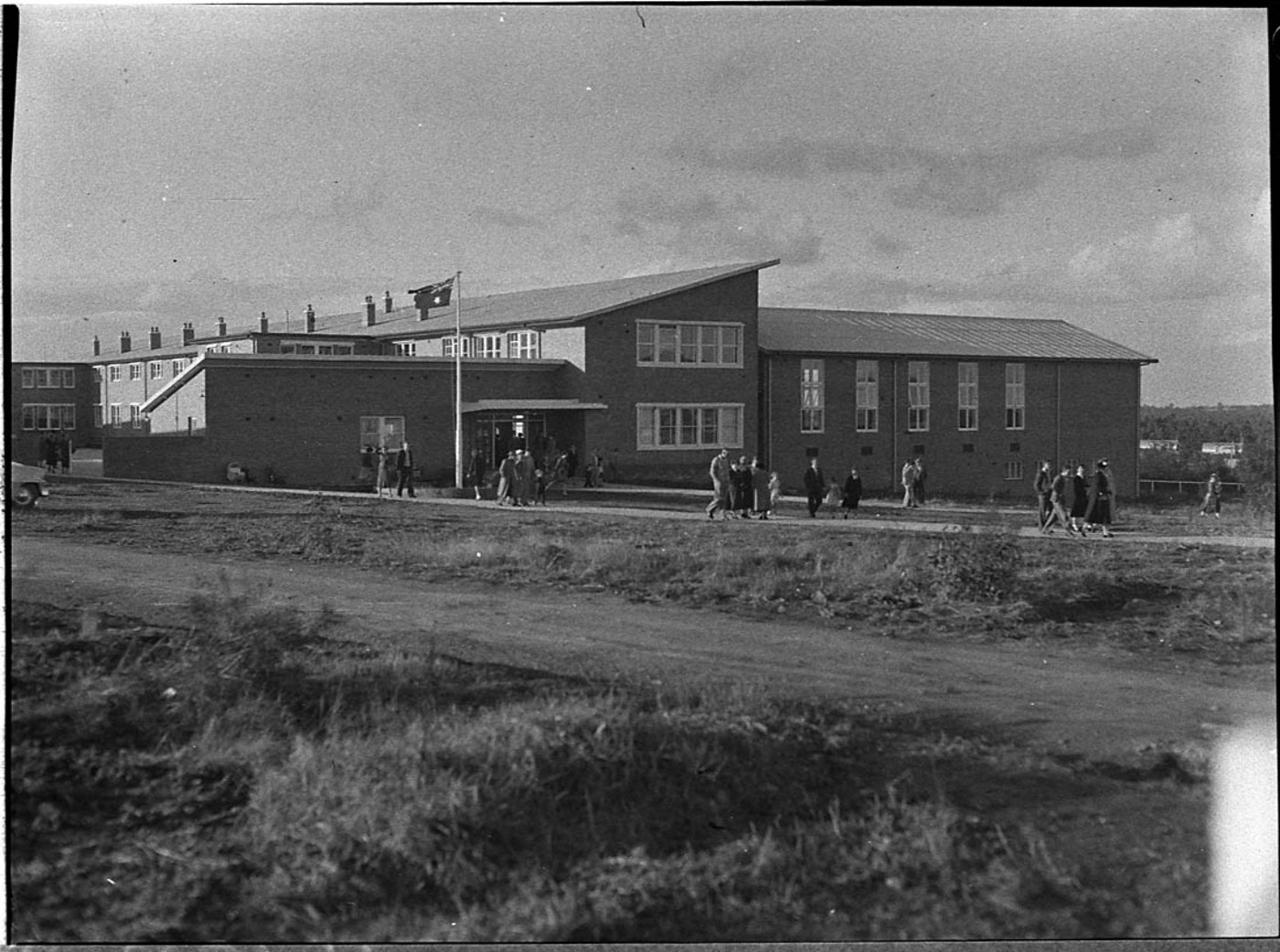
Newly constructed Kurri Kurri High School in 1956

=== Primary schools ===
- Kurri Kurri Public School
- Kurri Kurri Infants School
- The Holy Spirit Primary School
- Stanford Merthyr Infants School
- Pelaw Main Public School
- Weston Public School
- Abermain Public School

=== Secondary schools ===
- Kurri Kurri High School

=== Tertiary campuses ===
- Hunter Institute of TAFE Kurri Kurri Campus

== Local art ==
Local art includes more than 55 murals painted around the town and its environs depicting the history of the region and also recent events.

== Sport ==
Retired Newcastle Knights Rugby league player Andrew Johns, arguably the greatest player to have ever played the game, spent his childhood in Kurri Kurri, before moving to Cessnock. He would later play in the Kurri Kurri Under-16's side, as Cessnock was unable to field a team. Kurri Kurri is also noted as having produced more Rugby League internationals than any other bush town in Australia.

Kurri Kurri is also home to the 320 m (350 yd) long Loxford Park Speedway, a motorcycle speedway. The speedway has hosted a round of the Australian Solo Speedway Championship every year since 2011 as well as hosting the Australian Sidecar Speedway Championship twice (2012, 2014), the Australian Under-21 Solo Championship on three occasions (2012, 2013, 2015), the Australian Under-16 Solo Championship in 2012, and the NSW Solo Championship each year since 2011. The speedway has also hosted rounds of the Sidecar Grand Slam series and also holds the Jason Crump invitational for solos annually on Boxing Day in honour of Australia's only triple Speedway World Champion. Loxford Park also includes a 135 m (148 yd) junior (under-16) track on its infield.

== Heritage listings ==
Kurri Kurri has a number of heritage-listed sites, including:

- South Maitland Coalfields: Richmond Main Colliery

== Notable people ==
- Ken Booth – school teacher, sportsman, and politician
- Bob Bower - rugby league footballer
- Stan Callaghan - rugby league footballer
- Jim Comerford - union leader, writer, and miner
- Brad Dubberley - wheelchair rugby coach
- Luke Ford – writer
- Peter Foster, politician
- Bill Hamilton – rugby league footballer
- Paul Harragon – rugby league footballer
- Mona Hessing - fibre artist and weaver
- Jemma House - soccer player
- Mark Hughes – rugby league footballer
- George Hunter - rugby league footballer
- Bert James – Federal politician
- Richard Johnson – soccer player
- Cliff Kelly - rugby league footballer
- Percy Lennard - soccer player
- Ernest Llewellyn – violinist, violist
- Eddie Lumsden – rugby league footballer
- Jack Lumsden - rugby league footballer
- Jeff Masterman - rugby league footballer
- Greg McLaren – poet
- George Neilly – NSW State politician
- Sandy Pearson – Australian Army Major General
- Melody Pool - Country-folk musician
- Chad Reed – International motocross and supercross racer
- Kayla Romaniuk - rugby league footballer
- John Sattler – rugby league footballer
- Richard Saunders – actor, sceptic, writer, podcaster
- Adam Shields – Motorcycle speedway rider
- Gary Sullivan - rugby league footballer and criminal
- Meryl Swanson - politician
- Reegan Tanner – rugby league footballer
- Rohan Tungate - speedway rider
- Noel White - rugby league footballer

== See also ==
- List of reduplicated Australian place names

== Notes ==
1. The figure presented represents the average elevation as shown in 1:100000 map CESSNOCK 9132.
2. Area calculation is based on NSW GNB maps.
