= Peter Bracken (rugby league) =

Australian rugby league footballer

Personal information
- Full name: Patrick Peter Bracken
- Born: 19 June 1931 (age 94) Yass, New South Wales, Australia

Playing information
- Position: Halfback
Club
Years	Team	Pld	T	G	FG	P
1953	St. George Dragons	17	0	0	0	0
- Source: Whiticker/Hudson

Peter Bracken (born 1931) is an Australian former rugby league footballer who played in the 1950s.

A St George Dragons junior from Arncliffe, New South Wales, Peter Bracken played President's Cup for St. George in 1950 and was graded the following year. Bracken played one full season of first grade for the St George Dragons in 1953, replacing the previous year's halfback Ron Stanton. The highlight of his Dragons career was his selection in the 1953 Grand Final against the South Sydney Rabbitohs.

After 17 games, this was his last season with the club. He transferred to Parkes, New South Wales in 1954 and Captain/coached the local team and later in 1954, Bracken played against England in the combined Western Division team. Parkes won the Group Eleven competition in 1954 under the coaching of Bracken.
