= Bob Moon (rugby league) =

Australian rugby league player (1933–2023)

Personal information
- Full name: Robert Tasman Moon
- Born: 2 February 1933; Sydney, New South Wales, Australia
- Died: November 2023 (aged 90); Arncliffe, New South Wales, Australia

Playing information
- Position: Second-row
Club
Years	Team	Pld	T	G	FG	P
1951–52	Balmain	3	0	0	0	0
1953–57	South Sydney	19	8	0	0	24
	Total	22	8	0	0	24
- Source: As of 22 March 2019

Bob Moon (2 February 1933 – November 2023), also known as Ray Moon, was an Australian rugby league footballer who played in the 1950s. He played for South Sydney in the New South Wales Rugby League (NSWRL) competition during the club's second golden era where they won 5 premierships in 6 seasons from 1950 to 1955. Moon also played for Balmain.

== Playing career ==
Moon made his first grade debut for Balmain in 1951. Moon played with the club until the end of 1952 before signing with Souths.

Moon made his debut for South Sydney in 1953. Moon played for Souths in the 1953 NSWRL grand final against St George which South Sydney won convincingly 31–12 at the Sydney Cricket Ground in front of 44,581 spectators.

Moon went on to play with Souths until the end of the 1957 season but he did not feature in any further finals games for the club nor any of their grand final victories in 1954 and 1955.

== Death ==
Moon died Arncliffe, New South Wales in November 2023, at the age of 90.
