= Prebaked consumable carbon anode =

Type of anode for aluminium smelting

Prebaked consumable carbon anodes are a specific type of anode designed for aluminium smelting using the Hall-Héroult process.

== Use and end-of-life disposal ==
During the smelting process, these anodes are suspended within the electrolysis cell(s) containing the aluminium oxide or aluminium fluoride. The process consumes the anode at a rate of roughly 450 kg of anode per tonne of aluminium produced.

"Spent" anodes have little industrial use and are generally discarded; however, anodes that have been used to process aluminium fluoride may contain some amount of hydrogen fluoride and require hazardous waste disposal procedures. Efforts to find industrial use for spent anodes have led to proposals to use the anodes as a cost-effective alternative for coke in small-scale foundries that lack a ready supply of coke, and cannot afford modern electric furnaces.

== Industrial standards ==
The properties of the anode are largely set during the baking process and must be carefully controlled to ensure an acceptable output efficiency and reduce the amount of undesirable byproduct produced. To that end, the aluminium smelting industry has settled on a range of acceptable values for commercial mass-produced anodes for the purpose of consistent, optimal performance.

Industrial Standards for Prebaked Carbon Anodes
Property	Standard	Range
Baked apparent density	ISO 12985-1	1.53-1.64 gcm-3
Electrical resistance	ISO 11713	55-62 μΩ for pressed anodes
Compressive strength	ISO 18515	40-48 MPa
Young's modulus	RDC-144	3.5-5.5 GPa
Tensile strength	ISO 12986-1	8-10 MPa for pressed anodes
Thermal conductivity	ISO 12987	3.5-4.5W mK-1
Coefficient of thermal expansion	RDC-158	3.5-4.5 x 10-6 K-1
Air permeability	ISO 15906	0.5-1.5 nPm
Carboxy reactivity residue	ISO 12988-1	84-96%
Air reactivity residue	ISO 12989-1	0.05-0.3% per minute
Grain stability	N/A	70-90%

== Significance of the industrial standards ==
=== Density ===
Higher baking temperatures result in higher density anodes, which exhibit reduced permeability and therefore extend the operational life of the anode. However, excessive density will result in thermal shock and fracturing of the anode upon first use in an electrolysis cell.

=== Electrical resistance ===
Efficient aluminium smelting requires low resistance on the part of the anode. Low resistance results in greater control over the electrolysis cell's voltage and reduces the energy loss associated with resistive heating. However, anodes with low electrical resistance also exhibit increased thermal conductivity. Anodes that conduct too much heat will oxidize rapidly, reducing or eliminating their smelting efficiency, called "air burn" in industry parlance.

=== Mechanical strength (compressive strength, Young's modulus, tensile strength) ===
Anodes are subject to a variety of mechanical stresses during creation, transportation and use. Anodes must be resistant to compressive force, resistant to elastic stress, and resistant to impact without becoming brittle. The relationship between compressive strength and Young's modulus in prebaked anodes usually results in a compromise in the anode's resistance to compressive force and elastic stresses.

=== Thermal conductivity and thermal expansion ===
Low anode thermal conductivity results in "air burn", as noted in Electrical Resistance, above.

Low thermal expansion coefficients are desirable to avoid thermal shock.

=== Carbon reactivity and air permeability ===
Anodes should be relatively impermeable to both carbon dioxide and air generally to reduce the opportunity for "carbon dioxide burn" and "air burn", both of which will reduce the anode's smelting efficiency.

=== Grain stability ===
High grain stability indicates high anode structural integrity, increasing the smelting efficiency of the anode. High Grain stability also minimizes particle degradation during anode fabrication.
