= Aluminium smelting =

Process of extracting aluminium from its oxide alumina

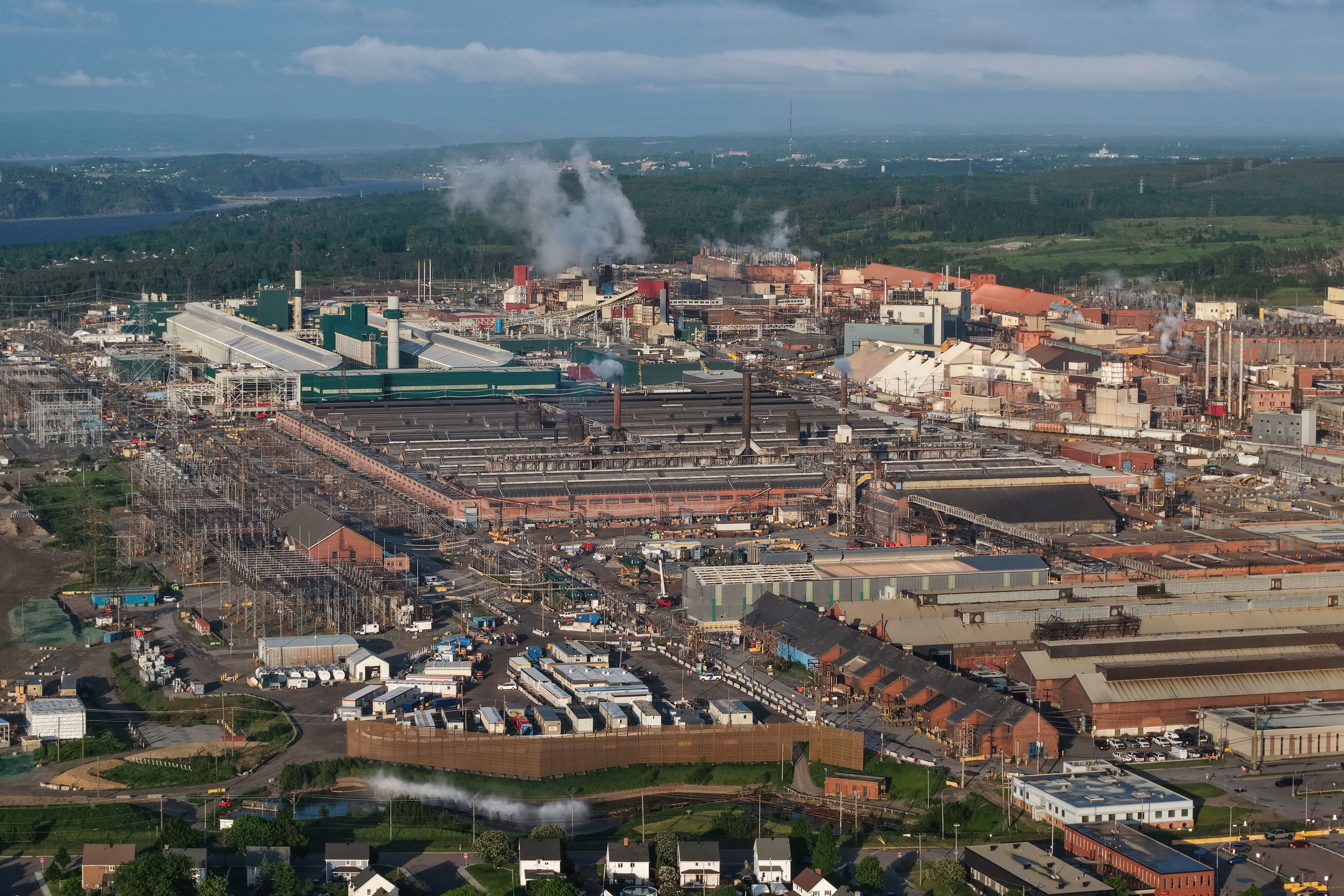
Aluminum smelter in Jonquière, Quebec

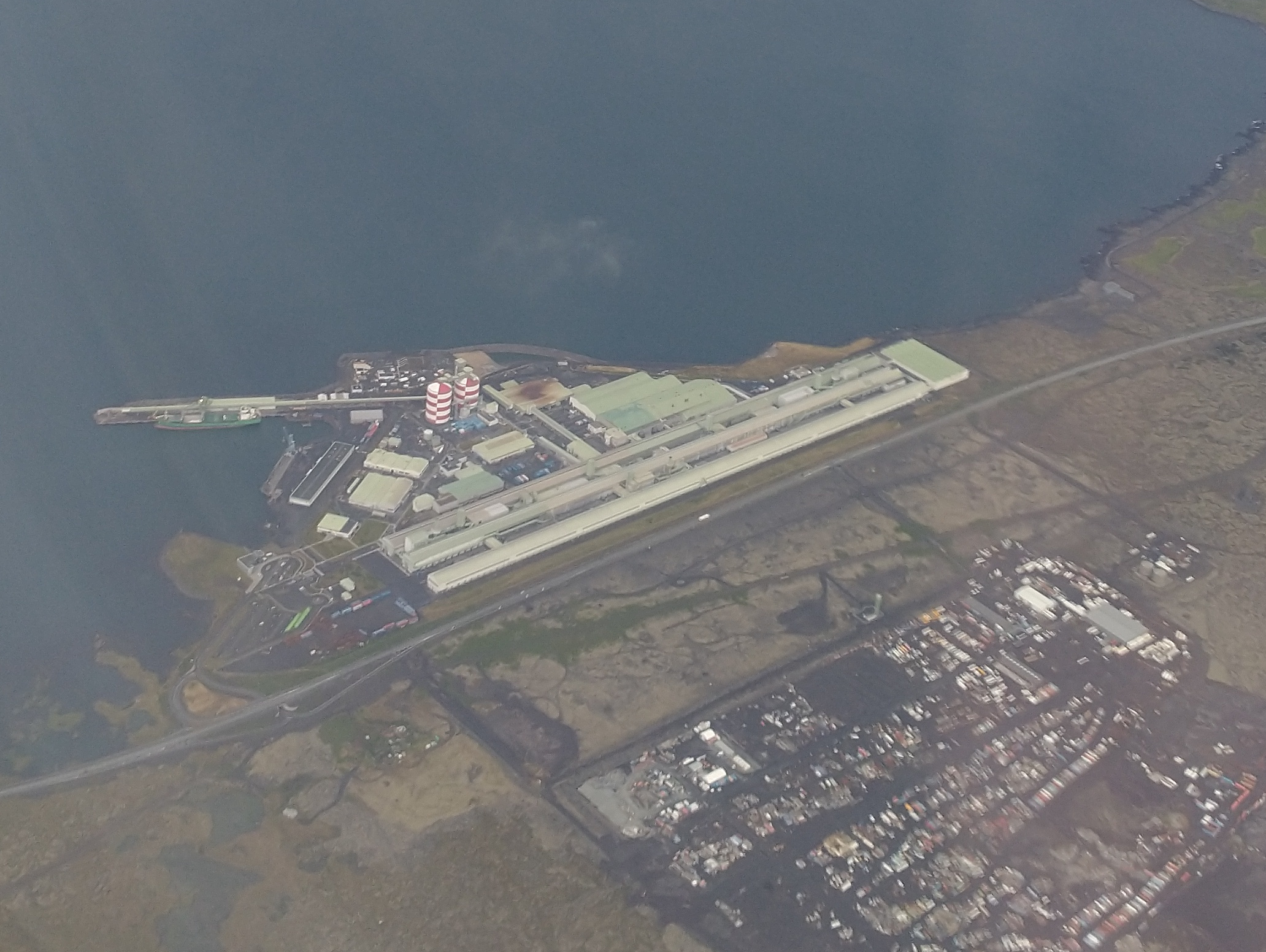
Straumsvik aluminum smelter, operated by Rio Tinto Alcan in Iceland.

Aluminium smelting is the process of extracting aluminium from its oxide, alumina, generally by the Hall-Héroult process. Alumina is extracted from the ore bauxite by means of the Bayer process at an alumina refinery.

This is an electrolytic process, so an aluminium smelter uses huge amounts of electric power; smelters tend to be located close to large power stations, often hydro-electric ones, in order to hold down costs and reduce the overall carbon footprint. Smelters are often located near ports, since many smelters use imported alumina.

== Layout of an aluminium smelter ==
The Hall-Héroult electrolysis process is the major production route for primary aluminium. An electrolytic cell is made of a steel shell with a series of insulating linings of refractory materials. The cell consists of a brick-lined outer steel shell as a container and support. Inside the shell, cathode blocks are cemented together by ramming paste. The top lining is in contact with the molten metal and acts as the cathode. The molten electrolyte is maintained at high temperature inside the cell. The prebaked anode is also made of carbon in the form of large sintered blocks suspended in the electrolyte. A single Soderberg electrode or a number of prebaked carbon blocks are used as anode, while the principal formulation and the fundamental reactions occurring on their surface are the same.

An aluminium smelter consists of a large number of cells (pots) in which the electrolysis takes place. A typical smelter contains anywhere from 300 to 720 pots, each of which produces about a ton of aluminium a day, though the largest proposed smelters are up to five times that capacity. Smelting is run as a batch process, with the aluminium deposited at the bottom of the pots and periodically siphoned off. Particularly in Australia these smelters are used to control electrical network demand, and as a result power is supplied to the smelter at a very low price. However power must not be interrupted for more than 4–5 hours, since the pots have to be repaired at significant cost if the liquid metal solidifies.

== Principle ==
Aluminium cannot be smelted like most other metals, such as copper or iron, because aluminium forms a very stable compound with oxygen, and the oxide has a very high melting point of about 2,072°C (3,762°F), which is why aluminum oxide is used as a refractory material lining smelting furnaces. The melting temperature of the smelting furnace lining cannot be the same as the ore being smelted. Aluminium is also more reactive than carbon, so carbon cannot draw oxygen out of aluminum oxide.

Therefore, aluminium is smelted by electrolytic reduction of aluminium oxide dissolved in molten cryolite.

$$\ce{Al^3+ + 3e- -> Al}$$

At the same time the carbon electrode is oxidised, initially to carbon monoxide

$$\ce{C + 1/2O2 -> CO}$$

Although the formation of carbon monoxide (CO) is thermodynamically favoured at the reaction temperature, the presence of considerable overvoltage (difference between reversible and polarization potentials) changes the thermodynamic equilibrium and a mixture of CO and CO_{2} is produced. Thus the idealised overall reactions may be written as

$$\begin{cases}
\ce{Al2O3 + 3/2C <=> 2Al + 3/2CO2} &: \Delta G\circ = (264460 + 3.75 T\log T - 92.52 T)\ \ce{cal} \\
\ce{Al2O3 + 3C <=> 2Al + 3CO} &: \Delta G^\circ = (325660 + 3.75 T\log T - 155.07 T)\ \ce{cal}
\end{cases}$$

By increasing the current density up to 1 A/cm^{2}, the proportion of CO_{2} increases and carbon consumption decreases.

As three electrons are needed to produce each atom of aluminium, the process requires a large amount of electricity. For this reason, aluminium smelters are often sited close to sources of inexpensive electricity, such as hydroelectric.

== Cell components ==
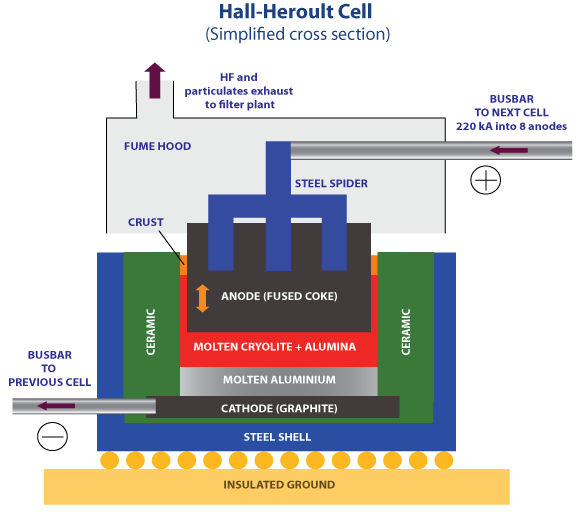
Aluminium electrolytic reduction cell

Electrolyte: The electrolyte is a molten bath of cryolite (Na_{3}AlF_{6}) and dissolved alumina. Cryolite is a good solvent for alumina with low melting point, satisfactory viscosity, and low vapour pressure. Its density is also lower than that of liquid aluminium (2 vs 2.3 g/cm^{3}), which allows natural separation of the product from the salt at the bottom of the cell. The cryolite ratio (NaF/AlF_{3}) in pure cryolite is 3, with a melting temperature of 1,010 °C (1,850 °F), and it forms a eutectic mixture with 11% alumina at 960 °C (1,760 °F). In industrial cells the cryolite ratio is kept between 2 and 3 to decrease its melting temperature to 940–980 °C (1,720–1,800 °F).

Cathode: Carbon cathodes are essentially made of anthracite, graphite and petroleum coke, which are calcined at around 1,200 °C (2,190 °F) and crushed and sieved prior to being used in cathode manufacturing. Aggregates are mixed with coal-tar pitch, formed, and baked. Carbon purity is not as stringent as for anode, because metal contamination from cathode is not significant. Carbon cathode must have adequate strength, good electrical conductivity and high resistance to wear and sodium penetration. Anthracite cathodes have higher wear resistance and slower creep with lower amplitude [15] than graphitic and graphitized petroleum coke cathodes. Instead, dense cathodes with more graphitic order have higher electrical conductivity, lower energy consumption [14], and lower swelling due to sodium penetration. Swelling results in early and non-uniform deterioration of cathode blocks.

Anode: Carbon anodes have a specific situation in aluminium smelting and depending on the type of anode, aluminium smelting is divided in two different technologies; "Soderberg" and "prebaked" anodes. Anodes are also made of petroleum coke, mixed with coal-tar-pitch, followed by forming and baking at elevated temperatures. The quality of anode affects technological, economical and environmental aspects of aluminium production. Energy efficiency is related to the nature of anode materials, as well as the porosity of baked anodes. Around 10% of cell power is lost to the electrical resistance of the prebaked anode (resistivity of 50–60 μΩ m). Carbon is consumed more than theoretical value due to a low current efficiency and non-electrolytic consumption. Inhomogeneous anode quality due to the variation in raw materials and production parameters also affects its performance and the cell stability.

Prebaked consumable carbon anodes are divided into graphitized and coke types. For manufacturing of the graphitized anodes, anthracite and petroleum coke are calcined and classified. They are then mixed with coal-tar pitch and pressed. The pressed green anode is then baked at 1,200 °C (2,190 °F) and graphitized. Coke anodes are made of calcined petroleum coke, recycled anode butts, and coal-tar pitch (binder). The anodes are manufactured by mixing aggregates with coal tar pitch to form a paste with a doughy consistency. This material is most often vibro-compacted but in some plants pressed. The green anode is then sintered at 1,100–1,200 °C (2,010–2,190 °F) for 300–400 hours, without graphitization, to increase its strength through decomposition and carbonization of the binder. Higher baking temperatures increase the mechanical properties and thermal conductivity, and decrease the air and CO_{2} reactivity. The specific electrical resistance of the coke-type anodes is higher than that of the graphitized ones, but they have higher compressive strength and lower porosity.

Soderberg electrodes (in-situ baking), used for the first time in 1923 in Norway, are composed of a steel shell and a carbonaceous mass which is baked by the heat being escaped from the electrolysis cell. Soderberg Carbon-based materials such as coke and anthracite are crushed, heat-treated, and classified. These aggregates are mixed with pitch or oil as binder, briquetted and loaded into the shell. Temperature increases bottom to the top of the column and in-situ baking takes place as the anode is lowered into the bath. Significant amount of hydrocarbons are emitted during baking which is a disadvantage of this type of electrodes. Most of the modern smelters use prebaked anodes since the process control is easier and a slightly better energy efficiency is achieved, compared to Soderberg anodes.

== Environmental issues of aluminium smelters ==
The process produces a quantity of fluoride waste: perfluorocarbons and hydrogen fluoride as gases, and sodium and aluminium fluorides and unused cryolite as particulates. This can be as small as 0.5 kg per tonne of aluminium in the best plants in 2007, up to 4 kilograms per tonne (8.0 lb/short ton) of aluminium in older designs in 1974. Unless carefully controlled, hydrogen fluorides tend to be very toxic to vegetation around the plants. The perfluorocarbons gases are strong greenhouse gases with a long lifetime.

The Soderberg process which bakes the Anthracite/pitch mix as the anode is consumed, produces significant emissions of polycyclic aromatic hydrocarbons as the pitch is consumed in the smelter.

The linings of the pots end up contaminated with cyanide-forming materials; Alcoa has a process for converting spent linings into aluminium fluoride for reuse and synthetic sand usable for building purposes and inert waste.

=== Inert anodes ===
Inert anodes are non-carbon based alternatives to traditional anodes used during aluminum reduction. These anodes do not chemically react with the electrolyte, and are therefore not consumed during the reduction process. Because the anode does not contain carbon, carbon dioxide is not produced. Through a review of literature, Haradlsson et al. found that inert anodes reduced the green house gas emissions of the aluminum smelting process by approximately 2 tonnes (2.0 long tons; 2.2 short tons) CO2eq/ tonne Al.

==== Types of anodes ====
Ceramic anode materials include Ni-Fe, Sn, and Ni-Li based oxides. These anodes show promise as they are extremely stable during the reduction process at normal operating temperatures (~1000 °C), ensuring that the Al is not contaminated. The stability of these anodes also allows them to be used with a range of electrolytes. However, ceramic anodes suffer from poor electrical conductivity and low mechanical strength.

Alternatively metal anodes boast high mechanical strength and conductivity but tend to corrode easily during the reduction process. Some material systems that are used in inert metal anodes include Al-Cu, Ni-Cu, and Fe-Ni-Cu systems. Additional additives such as Sn, Ag, V, Nb, Ir, Ru can be included in these systems to form non reactive oxides on the anode surface, but this significantly increases the cost and embodied energy of the anode.

Cermet anodes are the combination of a metal and ceramic anode, and aim to take advantage of the desirable properties of both; the electrical conductivity and toughness of the metal and stability of the ceramic. These anodes often consist of a combination of the above metal and ceramic materials. In industry, Alcoa and Rio Tinto have formed a joint venture, Elysis, to commercialize inert anode technology developed by Alcoa. The inert anode is a cermet material, a metallic dispersion of copper alloy in a ceramic matrix of nickel ferrite. Unfortunately, as the number of anode components increases, the structure of the anode becomes more unstable. As a result. cermet anodes also suffer from corrosion issues during reduction.

=== Energy use ===
Aluminium smelting is highly energy intensive, and in some countries is economical only if there are inexpensive sources of electricity. In some countries, smelters are given exemptions to energy policy like renewable energy targets.

To reduce the energy cost of the smelting process, alternative electrolytes such as Na3AlF6 are being investigated that can operate at a lower temperature. However, changing the electrolyte changes the kinetics of the liberated oxygen from the Al_{2}O_{3} ore. This change in bubble formation can alter the rate the anode reacts with Oxygen or the electrolyte and effectively change the efficiency of the reduction process.

Inert anodes, used in tandem with vertical electrode cells, can also reduce the energy cost of aluminum reduction up to 30% by lowering the voltage needed for reduction to occur. Applying these two technologies at the same times allows the anode-cathode distance to be minimized which decreases resistive losses.

== Example aluminium smelters ==
- Alcan Lynemouth Aluminium Smelter, powered by the coal-fired Lynemouth Power Station in North East England, ceased production in 2012, demolished in 2018.
- Anglesey Aluminium, powered by Wylfa nuclear power station in north-west Wales, closed in 2013, with redevelopment of the site announced in 2022.
- The Valco aluminium smelter in Ghana, powered by the Akosombo Hydroelectric Project
- Fjarðaál in Iceland, powered by the Kárahnjúkar Hydropower Plant
- Jharsuguda in Orissa, India, to be powered by its own 1,215 megawatts (1,629,000 hp) coal-fired power station.
- Aluminerie Alouette in Sept-Îles, Québec, powered by the Churchill Falls Hydro Electric project.
- Alba Smelter in Bahrain, powered by its own four power stations with a total generating capacity of 2,265 megawatts (3,037,000 hp).

== See also ==
- List of aluminium smelters
- List of alumina refineries
- Lead smelter
- Nuclear power
- Zinc smelting
- Solid oxide Hall–Héroult process
