= Bob Hobbs =

Australian rugby league footballer

Personal information
- Full name: Robert Longmore Hobbs
- Born: 25 January 1925 Ngaruawahia, Waikato, New Zealand
- Died: 18 May 2006 (aged 81) Dural, New South Wales, Australia

Playing information
- Position: Second-row
Club
Years	Team	Pld	T	G	FG	P
1945	Canterbury-Bankstown	4	2	7	0	20
1946	Western Suburbs	4	0	0	0	0
1949–54	Parramatta	79	12	146	0	328
	Total	87	14	153	0	348

Bob Hobbs (1926–2006) was an Australian rugby league footballer who played in the 1940s and 1950s. He played for Canterbury-Bankstown, Western Suburbs and Parramatta as a second rower.

== Playing career ==
Hobbs began his first grade career with Canterbury-Bankstown in 1945 after moving from Cowra in country New South Wales. Hobbs played 4 games with the club but featured more for the reserve grade team. In 1946, Hobbs joined Western Suburbs spending a solitary season with them making 4 appearances.

Hobbs captain-coached Cootamundra in the 1948 Maher Cup and Group 9 competition, the team winning the premiership and NSW Country's Clayton Cup.

In 1949, Hobbs joined newly admitted side Parramatta and was a regular starter for the club over the following 6 seasons finishing as top point scorer for the side in 1952 and 1953. Hobbs time at Parramatta was not a successful one though with the team finishing last on two occasions and finishing towards the bottom in the other years.
