= Pelaw Main, New South Wales =

Coordinates: 32.830°S 151.481°E

The Pelaw Main Colliery and loading facilities.

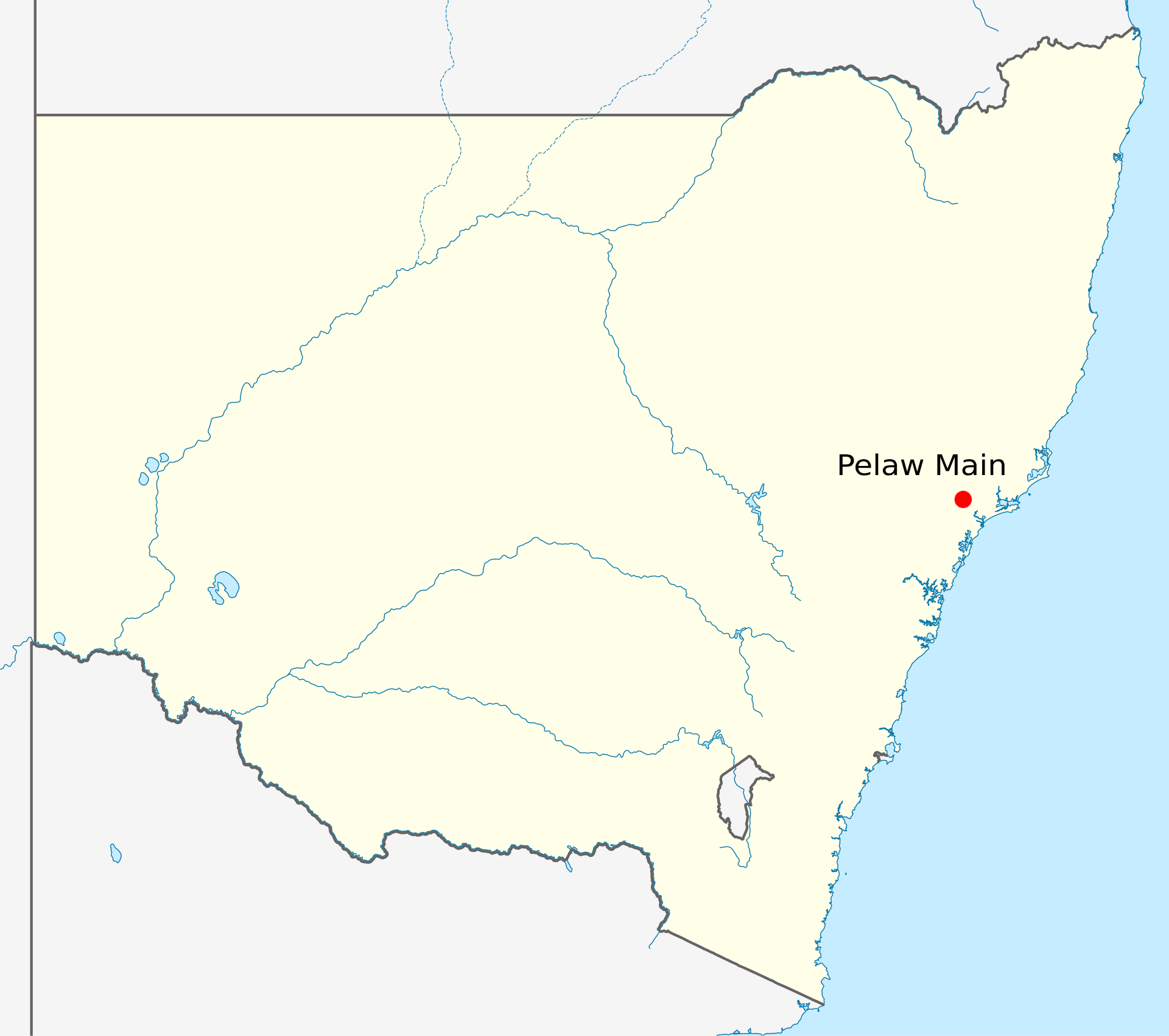
Pelaw Main Map

Pelaw Main is a hamlet a few kilometres south-west of Kurri Kurri, in the Hunter Region of New South Wales, Australia. It owes its origins entirely to the colliery there of the same name, and part of the South Maitland coalfields. It had a population of 1,027 in 2011.

== Pelaw Main Colliery ==
About 1900 the coal mining firm of J & A Brown purchased the leasehold of the proposed Stanford Greta No. 2 Colliery from the East Greta Coal Mining Company and soon afterwards changed the name of the property to Pelaw Main. Pelaw Main Colliery opened on 28 December 1900, the first mine to be opened in the region. By 1901 they had driven two tunnels into the 17 feet (5.2 m) seam of coal there. They then constructed a railway extension westwards from the terminus of the South Maitland Railway branch line at Victoria Street, Stanford Merthyr, to Pelaw Main, a distance of about 1 mile (1.6 km), which opened for traffic on 17 November 1901.

A brick-faced passenger platform was built at Reception Road, Pelaw Main, but passenger traffic ceased in 1932 with the scaling down of the branch from Aberdare Junction on the South Maitland Railway coupled with the fact that from 1918 coal from the Stanford Merthyr Colliery was being transported via the Richmond Vale Railway. In addition, the SMR branch was abandoned altogether by 1940 following major subsidence beneath it, leaving the Richmond Vale Railway to service fully Stanford Merthyr and Pelaw Main.

Pelaw Main Colliery was a major concern and large employer. By 1902 there were four coal loading 'roads' which accommodated sufficient wagons to hold 4000 tons of coal at any one time. Richmond Vale Railway was extended to form a main link, past the South Maitland Cemetery, to the South Maitland Railway at Weston Exchange Sidings near the eastern end of Weston Railway Station, the link being completed in 1936. This meant that in the unlikely event that the Richmond Vale Railway was blocked an alternative route for coal trains was available. The link was occasionally used when flooding blocked one, but not both rail lines – it was rare for both lines to be blocked at the same time.

In 1922 a direct railway line was constructed between Pelaw Main and Richmond Vale and passenger trains were run to convey miners to and from each mine.

In March 1929 Newcastle-based mine owner John Brown locked out workers from his mines at Pelaw Main and Richmond Main to try to force acceptance of lower wages. Attorney-General John Latham pursued legal action against Brown for illegally using coercive industrial tactics, but prime minister Stanley Bruce intervened to stop the prosecution, believing the case to be doubtful and that dropping it would give the government a chance to negotiate an end to the dispute. The mine-owners refused to accede to government-brokered negotiations anyway, and the government was seen to have been siding with rich businesses and applying double standards, undermining Bruce's own credibility as an impartial leader and law-and-order prime minister.

On 19 July 1957 a fatal explosion occurred in the colliery killing one miner Kenneth Roderick.

Pelaw Main Colliery closed in 1962 owing to the major coal industry slump at that time.

== Recent history ==
Pelaw Main has not changed much since the closing of the colliery. The population stays fairly small, recorded at 836 people in 2006 (a 1% growth since the 2001 census). The town had a small general store, but it has since closed. Most shopping is now done in nearby Kurri Kurri.

It also has a primary school, which was established in 1903.

A direct railway line was constructed in 1922 between Pelaw Main and Richmond Vale for the conveyance of miners to and from their shifts. In recent times this line has been rebuilt by the Richmond Vale Railway Museum and until damaged by a bush fire in 2017 was part of its regular tourist/enthusiast heritage train services. The bush fire damage is being remediated.

== Notable persons ==
- George Booth (1891–1960), miner and later member of the New South Wales Legislative Assembly.
- Bob Brown (1933–2022), ALP Federal member for Hunter, and Charlton.
- James Ormonde (1903–1970), miner and later Federal senator for New South Wales.
