= Horrie Toole =

Australian rugby league footballer (1931–2023)

Personal information
- Full name: Horace William Toole
- Born: 8 December 1931; Bathurst, New South Wales, Australia
- Died: 1 January 2023 (aged 91); South West Rocks, New South Wales, Australia

Playing information
- Position: Centre
Club
Years	Team	Pld	T	G	FG	P
1951–60	North Sydney	121	67	0	0	201

Horace William Toole (8 December 1931 – 1 January 2023) was an Australian rugby league footballer who played in the 1950s and 1960s. He played in the NSWRFL premiership for North Sydney as a five-eighth, centre and wing.

== Playing career ==
Toole began his first grade career in 1951. Toole was a member of the North's teams in the 1950s where the club made the preliminary finals in 1952 and 1953 but lost to South Sydney and the semi-finals in 1954 where they lost to St. George. During his playing career, Toole and teammate George Martin pioneered the design of modern cutaway boots. Toole retired at the end of the 1960 season and remains the club's sixth highest try scorer.

== Post-playing ==
After retirement, Toole coached teams at Leeton and Smithtown, and served as a director of North Sydney Leagues Club.

Toole died in South West Rocks, New South Wales on 1 January 2023, at the age of 91.
