= List of Parramatta Eels players =

There have been over 800 rugby league footballers that have played for the Parramatta Eels club since its introduction to the premiership in 1947. The club maintains an official players register, which lists them by their official player number.

== Players (since 1947) ==
Cap	Name	Nationality	Position	Seasons	Games	Tries	Goals	FG	Points	Ref
1	Keith Gersbach	AUS	Wing	1947–1948	24	12	0	0	36	
2	Les Bell	AUS	Five-eighth, Centre, Wing	1947–1949	14	0	27	0	54	
3	Bob Andrews	AUS	Centre, Fullback	1947–1948	20	4	32	0	76	
4	George Cook	AUS	Hooker, Second-row	1947	17	3	0	0	9	
5	Edward Hearn	AUS	Second-row, Lock, Centre, Prop	1947–1950	16	1	0	0	3	
6	Fred McKean	AUS	Prop, Second-row	1947–1948	21	1	0	0	3	
7	Dan Munro	AUS	Wing	1947	13	6	0	0	18	
8	George Robertson	AUS	Lock	1947–1951	67	4	0	0	12	
9	George Saywell	AUS	Second-row	1947	11	0	0	0	0	
10	Colin Schomberg	AUS	Fullback	1947–1951	72	2	127	2	264	
11	Arthur Slattery	AUS	Lock, Second-row, Prop	1947–1949	34	2	1	0	8	
12	Johnny Smith	AUS	Second-row	1947–1950	46	5	0	0	15	
13	Wally Woodward	AUS	Halfback	1947	18	5	0	0	15	
14	Neville Brennan	AUS	Second-row, Lock, Prop	1947–1950	18	3	0	0	9	
15	R Croghan	AUS	Hooker	1947–1948	3	0	0	0	0	
16	Don Schilling	AUS	Fullback	1947	1	0	0	0	0	
17	Doug Spurway	AUS	Prop, Second-row	1947	14	1	0	0	3	
18	Max Wilson	AUS	Prop, Second-row, Lock, Hooker	1947–1951	63	5	0	0	15	
19	Keith Tull	AUS	Centre	1947	4	2	2	0	10	
20	Tom Wedesweiler	AUS	Centre, Five-eighth	1947–1948	13	3	0	0	9	
21	Rolf Trudgett	AUS	Five-eighth	1947–1954	55	14	0	0	42	
22	Jack Hayward	AUS	Halfback	1948–1949	36	6	0	0	18	
23	Vic Hey	AUS	Five-eighth, Centre	1948–1949	10	3	0	0	9	
24	J Jewell	AUS	Second-row, Prop	1948–1949	12	4	0	0	12	
25	Ian Johnston	AUS	Fullback, Centre	1948–1954	90	44	68	0	268	
26	C Little	AUS	Fullback, Wing	1948	2	0	0	0	0	
27	K Schultz	AUS	Prop	1948	14	0	0	0	0	
28	Bruce Mann	AUS	Second-row	1948–1958	157	36	2	0	112	
29	Neville Spence	AUS	Hooker	1948–1952	46	1	0	0	3	
30	Ted Evans	AUS	Wing, Centre	1948–1953	62	32	0	0	96	
31	Arthur Jones	AUS	Wing, Centre	1948–1949	1	3	0	0	9	
32	Bob Jones	AUS	Fullback, Wing	1948–1953	18	0	0	0	0	
33	Eric Munro	AUS	Lock	1948	5	0	0	0	0	
34	Bob Hobbs	AUS	Second-row, Prop	1949–1954	79	12	146	0	328	
35	Mitchell Wallace	AUS	Wing	1949–1952	66	57	0	0	171	
36	Don Regan	AUS	Lock, Second-row	1949–1953	73	4	0	0	12	
37	Ron Golden	AUS	Centre, Wing	1949	10	1	0	0	3	
38	Pat Tosh	AUS	Hooker	1949	1	0	0	0	0	
39	D Brooks	AUS	Hooker	1949	2	0	0	0	0	
40	M Phillips	AUS	Second-row	1949	2	0	0	0	0	
41	Tim Hobbs	AUS	Prop	1949	1	0	0	0	0	
42	Neil Phelps	AUS	Wing, Centre	1949–1950	2	1	0	0	3	
43	Jack Henniker	AUS	Wing	1950	7	2	0	0	6	
44	Lance Thompson	AUS	Halfback	1950–1958	69	8	0	0	24	
45	Frank Stephenson	AUS	Wing, Fullback	1950–1952	3	0	0	0	0	
46	Don Graham	AUS	Five-eighth, Centre	1950–1952	24	5	0	0	15	
47	Phil McCarroll	AUS	Hooker	1950–1955	46	3	0	0	9	
48	Kevin Spencer	AUS	Fullback	1950	4	0	1	0	2	
49	Bob Fullerton	AUS	Prop	1950	1	0	0	0	0	
50	Ron Sweeney	AUS	Wing	1950–1951	8	4	0	0	12	
51	Ray Nicholson	AUS	Prop, Second-row	1951	15	1	0	0	3	
52	Johnny Ross	AUS	Five-eighth	1951–1955	33	6	0	0	18	
53	Ralph Bryant	AUS	Centre	1951–1952	17	8	0	0	24	
54	Bob Black	AUS	Hooker	1951–1953	2	0	0	0	0	
55	Lyle Ferguson	AUS	Second-row, Lock	1951–1952	1	0	0	0	0	
56	Billy Morris	AUS	Five-eighth, Centre	1951	6	0	0	0	0	
57	Billy Lovell	AUS	Prop	1951–1952	3	0	0	0	0	
58	Jim Poland	AUS	Halfback	1951	11	0	0	0	0	
59	Col Fussell	AUS	Prop, Second-row	1951–1952	3	0	4	0	8	
60	Jack Conley	AUS	Halfback	1952	3	0	0	0	0	
61	Colin Curry	AUS	Second-row, Prop	1952	18	2	0	0	6	
62	Pat Donnelly	AUS	Prop	1952	2	0	0	0	0	
63	Neil Gibson	AUS	Wing, Centre	1952	11	2	0	0	6	
64	Johnny Rouse	AUS	Five-eighth, Centre	1952–1953	29	5	0	0	15	
65	Col Yarham	AUS	Second-row, Prop	1952	6	0	0	0	0	
66	Russ Croger	AUS	Lock	1952	5	0	0	0	0	
67	Fred Johnstone	AUS	Wing	1952	3	0	0	0	0	
68	Alf Hemsworth	AUS	Fullback	1952	5	0	0	0	0	
69	Bruce Noble	AUS	Prop	1952	4	0	0	0	0	
70	Stan Campbell	AUS	Halfback	1952	4	0	0	0	0	
71	Alan Cameron	AUS	Second-row, Prop	1952–1956	67	12	0	0	36	
72	Geoff Cook	AUS	Centre	1952	4	0	0	0	0	
73	K Leonard	AUS	Lock	1952	2	0	0	0	0	
74	R Hawkins	AUS	Five-eighth	1952	2	0	0	0	0	
75	Cyril Lothian	AUS	Centre	1952–1953	1	1	0	0	3	
76	Frank Dockrey	AUS	Wing	1953	12	5	12	0	39	
77	Roy Fisher	AUS	Prop	1953–1962	161	12	0	0	36	
78	Jack Noon	AUS	Centre, Five-eighth	1953–1957	12	3	0	0	9	
79	Alec Perkins	AUS	Halfback, Centre	1953–1954	18	6	0	0	18	
80	Johnny Slade	AUS	Fullback	1953–1959	77	16	39	0	126	
81	Ken Slattery	AUS	Lock	1953–1957	57	14	0	0	42	
82	Jerry Clancy	AUS	Centre, Wing	1953	6	4	0	0	12	
83	Ron Hubbard	AUS	Five-eighth	1953	1	0	0	0	0	
84	Kevin Muller	AUS	Halfback	1953	12	0	0	0	0	
85	Brian Jones	AUS	Halfback	1953–1958	30	7	51	0	123	
86	Keith Agget	AUS	Hooker	1953–1955	38	3	0	0	9	
87	Peter Lean	AUS	Wing	1953	3	1	0	0	3	
88	Max Ferguson	AUS	Lock	1953	1	0	0	0	0	
89	Kevin Smyth	AUS	Second-row, Lock	1953	7	0	0	0	0	
90	Charlie McNamara	AUS	Fullback	1953–1957	15	1	4	0	11	
91	Don Tosh	AUS		1953–1958	62	12	1	0	38	
92	Max Bailey	AUS		1954	17	6	0	0	18	
93	Mick Crocker	AUS	Second-row	1954–1955	27	4	0	0	12	
94	Don Ferguson	AUS	Wing, Centre	1954–1955	17	4	8	0	28	
95	Charlie Gill	AUS	Prop	1954	18	3	1	0	11	
96	Maurice McClintock	AUS		1954	9	1	7	0	17	
97	Tom Anderson	AUS		1954	7	1	0	0	3	
98	John Schafer	AUS		1954	1	0	0	0	0	
99	Joe Jorgenson	AUS	Centre	1954	5	0	11	0	22	
100	Gordon Aisbett	AUS		1954	7	3	1	0	11	
101	Bob Gray	AUS		1954	7	0	0	0	0	
102	D Roach	AUS		1954	2	0	0	0	0	
103	Les Weatherall	AUS		1954	1	0	0	0	0	
104	Ray Burke	AUS		1955–1958	49	11	0	0	33	
105	Peter Thompson	AUS		1955–1957	53	6	0	0	18	
106	Darcy Williams	AUS		1955–1956	22	6	0	0	18	
107	Clive Lemon	AUS		1955	9	5	0	0	15	
108	Ivan Dickson	AUS		1955	8	3	0	0	9	
109	Brian Hogan	AUS		1955–1956	6	0	0	0	0	
110	C Bruce	AUS		1955	1	1	0	0	3	
111	Colin Dredge	AUS		1955	2	0	0	0	0	
112	J McGroary	AUS		1955	4	0	0	0	0	
113	A Williams	AUS		1955	2	1	0	0	3	
114	Keith Collins	AUS		1955	7	0	0	0	0	
115	Barry Davis	AUS		1955–1957	17	5	0	0	15	
116	R Garrard	AUS		1955	6	0	0	0	0	
117	R Treacy	AUS		1955	1	0	0	0	0	
118	Tom Burden	AUS		1955–1956	3	2	0	0	6	
119	Arthur Adams	AUS		1956	4	0	6	0	12	
120	Alvin Kirkland	USA		1956	18	4	0	0	12	
121	Graham Laird	AUS	Five-eighth	1956	17	4	9	0	3	
122	Billy Rayner	AUS	Hooker	1956–1966	195	6	0	0	18	
123	John Hickey	AUS		1956–1959	14	4	0	0	12	
124	Ken Hurst	AUS		1956	5	0	15	0	30	
125	Ron Newham	AUS		1956	9	1	0	0	3	
126	F Forster	AUS		1956	1	0	0	0	0	
127	Jack Fisher	AUS		1956	4	2	0	0	6	
128	Jack Graham	AUS		1956–1957	21	4	0	0	12	
129	Brian McNamara	AUS		1956	3	0	0	0	0	
130	Noel Cornwall	AUS		1956–1964	78	7	0	0	21	
131	Kevin Cocks	AUS		1956–1957	16	0	24	0	48	
132	Tom Whitehouse	AUS		1956–1957	6	1	0	0	3	
133	J Hedge	AUS		1956	1	0	0	0	0	
134	Ken Coles	AUS		1956	4	2	0	0	6	
135	Frank Cruise	AUS	Fullback	1957	3	0	1	0	2	
136	Alan Ferguson	AUS		1957	5	0	0	0	0	
137	Bob Hansen	AUS		1957–1958	32	9	25	0	77	
138	Alan Morrell	AUS		1957	1	0	0	0	0	
139	Neville Wall	AUS		1957	2	0	0	0	0	
140	E Thompson	AUS		1957	1	0	0	0	0	
141	Rod Blundell	AUS		1957–1960	6	0	0	0	0	
142	Ted Brennan	AUS		1957	8	0	22	0	44	
143	Noel Atkins	AUS		1957	3	0	0	0	0	
144	Arthur Bartley	AUS		1957	4	0	0	0	0	
145	George Byrnes	AUS		1957–1959	18	3	0	0	9	
146	Matt Johnston	AUS		1957–1963	67	4	0	0	12	
147	Alan Beggs	AUS		1957	2	1	0	0	3	
148	Len Wadling	AUS	Wing	1957	3	1	0	0	3	
149	Brian Simpson	AUS		1957	2	0	0	0	0	
150	Ted "Ticka" Tosh	AUS		1957–1958	9	0	0	0	0	
151	Barry Beeche	AUS		1958	1	0	0	0	0	
152	Mick Harvey	AUS		1958	2	0	0	0	0	
153	Ray Preston	AUS	Centre, Wing	1958–1959	17	8	0	0	24	
154	Ken Stubbs	AUS		1958–1959	33	0	41	0	82	
155	Bob Mavin	AUS		1958–1959	7	0	0	0	0	
156	John Corrigan	AUS		1958	5	0	0	0	0	
157	John Bulluss	AUS		1958	12	3	0	0	9	
158	Bob Godfrey	AUS		1958–1959	4	0	0	0	0	
159	Rod Payne	AUS		1958	3	0	0	0	0	
160	Lindsay Armour	AUS		1958–1965	69	3	6	0	21	
161	John Patterson	AUS		1958	12	0	0	0	0	
162	Col Alterator	AUS	Centre, Wing	1958–1962	27	5	0	0	15	
163	Bernie Jones	AUS		1958	3	0	0	0	0	
164	R Overton	AUS		1958	1	0	0	0	0	
165	Ross Carson	AUS		1958	3	0	0	0	0	
166	Doug Moore	AUS		1958–1959	14	0	19	0	38	
167	Mick Blood	AUS		1959	17	1	0	0	3	
168	John Gill	AUS		1959	13	2	0	0	6	
169	Harry Caines	AUS		1959	13	0	0	0	0	
170	B Ferney	AUS		1959	1	0	0	0	0	
171	Robin Gair	AUS	Halfback	1959–1964	55	22	12	0	90	
172	Fred Moore	AUS		1959–1961	19	7	0	0	21	
173	Maurie Burgmann	AUS		1959	2	0	0	0	0	
174	Keith Harrison	AUS		1959–1960	3	0	0	0	0	
175	Les Midson	AUS		1959	3	0	1	0	2	
176	Frank Gavin	AUS		1959–1960	8	0	0	0	0	
177	Ron Workman	AUS	Hooker	1959–1964	10	0	0	0	0	
178	Tom Crogan	AUS		1959–1960	7	1	0	0	3	
179	Brian Cox	AUS	Fullback	1960–1964	46	9	0	0	27	
180	Keith Griffiths	AUS		1960–1962	22	3	54	0	117	
181	Kevin Hole	AUS	Wing	1960–1961	29	11	6	0	45	
182	Bill Lockett	AUS		1960–1961	13	1	0	0	3	
183	Paul Pyers	AUS	Fullback, Centre	1960–1962	10	5	17	0	49	
184	Ron Boden	AUS	Centre	1960–1963	36	9	0	0	27	
185	Martin Gallagher	AUS	Centre	1960	10	3	0	0	9	
186	Roger Ludkin	AUS		1960–1962	6	0	3	0	6	
187	Col Pritchard	AUS		1960	6	0	0	0	0	
188	Allen Smith	AUS		1960	3	0	5	0	10	
189	Mick Dunning	AUS		1960	6	0	0	0	0	
190	Bill Patterson	AUS		1960	3	0	0	0	0	
191	Doug Harrison	AUS		1960	1	0	0	0	0	
192	Kevin Armstrong	AUS		1960	3	0	0	0	0	
193	Allan Elsworthy	AUS		1960–1961	10	2	0	0	6	
194	Barry Wickham	AUS	Centre	1960	1	0	0	0	0	
195	Russ Butler	AUS		1961	14	2	0	0	6	
196	Brian Hambly	AUS	Lock, Second-row, Prop	1961–1967	105	6	46	0	110	
197	Ron Lynch	AUS	Lock	1961–1971	194	28	0	0	84	
198	Peter Ryan	AUS	Lock	1961–1962	14	2	0	0	6	
199	Kevin Considine	AUS	Wing	1961	9	1	10	0	23	
200	Keith Rhind	AUS		1961	2	0	0	0	0	
201	Mike Burke	AUS		1961	4	0	0	0	0	
202	Charles Cooksley	AUS		1961–1962	13	0	0	0	0	
203	Gary Cooney	AUS		1961–1962	2	0	0	0	0	
204	Charlie Donovan	AUS	Wing, Centre	1961	6	1	0	0	3	
205	Geoff Beesley	AUS		1961	7	0	0	0	3	
206	Ken Foord	RSA	Centre	1961–1965	66	29	0	0	87	
207	Bill McCall	AUS	Prop	1961–1963	32	1	0	0	3	
208	Mike Jackson	AUS	Wing	1962–1964	48	15	0	0	45	
209	Geoff Weekes	AUS	Centre	1962–1963	24	7	0	0	21	
210	Bob Bugden	AUS	Halfback	1962–1965	74	15	33	0	111	
211	Arch Foy	AUS	Centre	1962	1	0	0	0	0	
212	Noel Dolton	AUS	Prop, Second-row	1962–1964	50	2	0	0	6	
213	Leo Toohey	AUS	Five-eighth	1962–1963	31	4	1	0	14	
214	Ken Thornett	AUS	Fullback	1962–1968, 1971	129	17	0	6	63	
215	Peter Matson	AUS		1962	1	0	27	0	54	
216	Clive Crawley	AUS		1962	2	0	1	0	2	
217	Bill Roney	AUS	Centre	1963–1964	27	7	0	0	21	
218	Dick Thornett	AUS	Second-row	1963–1971	16	35	15	19	173	
219	Ron Willey	AUS	Fullback	1963–1964	7	1	2	0	43	
220	Derek Hallas	ENG	Centre	1963–1965	44	8	7	0	38	
221	Rick Baber	AUS		1963–1964	5	2	0	0	6	
222	Max Burgmann	AUS		1963	1	0	0	0	0	
223	Barry Leaney	AUS	Hooker, Prop	1964–1971	93	4	0	0	12	
224	Ivor Lingard	ENG	Five-eighth, Halfback	1964–1970	111	20	1	8	78	
225	Barry Rushworth	AUS	Centre	1964–1971	104	25	0	0	75	
226	John Cox	AUS		1964	8	4	0	0	12	
227	Kerry Burke	AUS	Centre	1964–1968	35	2	2	0	10	
228	Alex Gilandas	AUS	Second-row	1964–1965	4	0	0	0	0	
229	Val Shoudra	AUS		1964	1	0	0	0	0	
230	Bill Jones	AUS	Hooker	1964–1968	27	1	0	0	3	
231	Arch Brown	AUS	Wing	1965–1969	72	24	194	0	460	
232	Vic Collins	AUS		1965–1966	3	0	0	0	0	
233	Gerry Edser	AUS		1965–1966	2	3	0	0	9	
234	Jim Poulos	AUS		1965	2	0	0	0	0	
235	Ron Jelley	AUS		1965	1	0	0	0	0	
236	Fred Baber Jr.	AUS		1965	1	0	0	0	0	
237	Ted Heinrich	AUS		1965–1968	23	4	0	0	12	
238	Jim Brophy	AUS		1966	8	1	0	0	3	
239	Ern Gillon	AUS	Centre	1966	17	0	0	0	0	
240	Mike Jones	AUS		1966–1969	50	8	0	0	24	
241	Fred Pickup	AUS		1966–1968	29	12	0	0	36	
242	Len Stacker	AUS	Wing	1966–1967	23	8	62	0	148	
243	John McMartin	AUS	Hooker	1966–1975	167	14	0	0	42	
244	Barry Norden	AUS		1966–1968	1	1	0	0	3	
245	Gabe Very	AUS		1966–1967	14	3	0	0	9	
246	Dave Irvine	AUS		1966–1970	42	16	0	0	48	
247	Peter Mahboub	AUS		1966	5	0	0	0	0	
248	Peter Linde	AUS		1966–1967	14	2	0	0	6	
249	Rod Smith	AUS		1966	1	0	0	0	0	
250	Bob O'Reilly	AUS	Prop	1967–1975, 1980–1982	216	29	0	0	87	
251	Brian Winney	AUS	Halfback	1967–1968	32	11	0	4	41	
252	Frank Glover	AUS		1967	4	1	1	2	27	
253	Brian Bevan	AUS		1967	3	1	3	0	9	
254	Paul Gibson	AUS	Five-eighth	1967–1968	23	5	0	0	15	
255	Joe Turski	AUS		1967–1970	51	1	5	0	4	
256	Ron Graham	AUS		1967–1974	95	2	0	0	6	
257	Peter Peters	AUS	Lock	1968	11	1	28	1	61	
258	Peter Wright	AUS		1968	1	0	0	0	0	
259	Bill Richards	AUS		1968	6	0	3	2	1	
260	Peter Delaney	AUS		1968–1970	24	5	0	0	15	
261	Bill Robinson	ENG	Prop	1968	4	0	0	0	0	
262	Keith Campbell	AUS	Centre, Lock	1968–1975	111	13	171	0	381	
263	Malcolm Moss	AUS		1969–1970	17	2	12	1	32	
264	John Wilson	AUS	Halfback	1969–1973, 1975–1976	11	17	0	0	51	
265	Chris Coy	AUS	Hooker	1969–1973	11	1	0	0	3	
266	Jersey Komorowski	AUS		1969–1970	6	0	0	0	0	
267	John Vincent	AUS	Second-row	1969–1976	59	19	0	0	57	
268	Denis Fitzgerald	AUS	Prop	1970–1977	145	37	0	0	111	
269	Bland Liles	AUS	Wing, Fullback	1970–1972	16	3	29	1	69	
270	Roy Warby	AUS		1970	5	0	0	0	0	
271	Gary Pethybridge	AUS	Centre	1970–1972	31	9	0	0	27	
272	Bob Eldridge	AUS		1970	3	0	0	0	0	
273	Kevin MacFarlane	AUS		1970–1972, 1975–1976	41	18	0	0	54	
274	Greg Hyde	AUS		1970	3	0	0	0	0	
275	Graham Lye	AUS	Five-eighth	1970–1972	51	7	0	1	22	
276	Dennis Mount	AUS	Prop	1970–1972	13	2	34	7	88	
277	Rod Tolhurst	AUS		1970	2	1	0	0	3	
278	Terry Scurfield	AUS	Wing	1970–1973	58	21	0	0	63	
279	Laurie Wakefield	AUS		1970–1971	9	2	1	0	8	
280	Tony Bargh	AUS		1970	2	1	0	0	3	
281	Peter Langmack	AUS	Centre, Lock	1971–1972, 1977–1978	32	6	0	0	18	
282	Peter Archibald	AUS	Wing	1971–1972	10	4	0	0	12	
283	Noel McHale	AUS		1971	2	0	0	0	0	
284	Tony Buckpitt	AUS		1971	3	2	0	0	6	
285	Chris Dengate	AUS		1971	1	0	0	0	0	
286	Grahame Ernst	AUS	Prop	1971–1973	19	4	11	0	34	
287	John Archibald	AUS		1972	1	0	0	0	0	
288	Phil Jelley	AUS	Fullback	1972–1973	26	4	0	0	12	
289	Bryan Smith	AUS		1972–1973	17	1	0	0	3	
290	Max Williamson	AUS		1972	4	0	0	0	0	
291	Garry Thomas	AUS	Wing, Fullback	1972–1974	43	12	34	0	104	
292	Terry Glover	AUS	Wing	1972	10	3	0	0	9	
293	Ian Kedward	AUS		1972–1973	6	0	0	0	0	
294	Russ Devonshire	AUS		1972	9	1	0	0	3	
295	Noel Park	AUS		1972	2	0	0	0	0	
296	Alec Tennant	AUS	Centre	1972	4	0	0	0	0	
297	Adrian Anderson	AUS		1972	1	0	0	0	0	
298	Brian Bennett	AUS		1972–1973	16	1	0	0	3	
299	John Kolc	AUS	Halfback	1972–1981	100	14	0	0	42	
300	Bob Jay	AUS	Prop	1972–1980	55	1	0	0	3	
301	Phil Chesham	AUS		1973	2	0	0	0	0	
302	Mike Leary	AUS	Fullback	1973	20	1	0	0	3	
303	John Quayle	AUS	Lock	1973–1976	56	13	0	0	39	
304	Terry Reynolds	AUS	Halfback	1973–1975	48	17	0	1	52	
305	Dave Gandy	AUS		1973–1974	7	2	0	0	6	
306	Tony Charlton	AUS	Prop	1973–1976	38	2	0	0	6	
307	Jon Clark	AUS		1973	5	1	0	0	3	
308	Owen Frith	AUS		1973	5	1	10	0	23	
309	Warren Zubrycki	AUS		1973	1	0	0	0	0	
310	Greg Moore	AUS		1973–1977	18	1	0	0	3	
311	Trevor McCarroll	AUS		1973–1974	8	0	0	0	0	
312	Barry Payne	AUS		1973	1	0	0	0	0	
313	John Ring	AUS		1973	3	0	0	0	0	
314	John Neagle	AUS		1973	1	0	0	0	0	
315	John Baker	AUS	Lock, Second-row, Prop	1974–1979	63	5	0	0	15	
316	Mick Bellew	AUS		1974	3	0	6	0	12	
317	Mal Cheney	AUS	Halfback	1974–1975	9	1	0	0	3	
318	Mark Cohen	AUS		1974	5	1	0	0	3	
319	Kevin Hogan	AUS	Five-eighth	1974	14	3	0	0	9	
320	Mal McMartin	AUS	Centre, Wing	1974–1975	32	6	0	0	18	
321	John Payne	AUS	Second-row	1974	8	2	0	0	6	
322	Denis Pittard	AUS	Five-eighth	1974–1975	35	11	28	0	89	
323	John Moran	AUS	Centre	1974–1977	34	9	0	0	27	
324	Geoff Gerard	AUS	Centre, Second-row	1974–1980	139	30	18	0	126	
325	Phil Mann	AUS	Fullback	1974–1978, 1981	51	19	0	0	57	
326	Wayne Levy	AUS		1974	6	0	10	0	20	
327	Ed Sulkowicz	AUS	Centre	1974–1980	68	12	3	0	42	
328	Ted Sulkowicz	AUS	Centre	1974–1978	22	0	1	0	2	
329	Ross Law	AUS		1974	4	0	6	0	12	
330	Steve Kovacs	AUS		1974	4	0	0	0	0	
331	Dave Cotter	AUS	Fullback	1975	10	2	34	0	74	
332	Ray Higgs	AUS	Second-row	1975–1977	70	11	0	0	33	
333	Jim Porter	AUS	Wing	1975–1977	67	35	0	0	105	
334	Ray Strudwick	AUS	Wing, Centre	1975	6	1	0	0	3	
335	Steve Williams	AUS	Prop	1975–1976	6	4	0	0	12	
336	Graham Olling	AUS	Prop	1975–1979	86	11	0	0	33	
337	Ron Hilditch	AUS	Hooker, Prop	1975–1982	157	24	0	0	72	
338	Olaf Prattl	AUS	Wing	1975	6	2	0	0	6	
339	Owen Stephens	NZL	Wing	1975, 1977	19	7	0	0	21	
340	Neville Glover	AUS	Wing	1975–1981	119	55	0	0	165	
341	Kevin Webb	AUS	Hooker	1975–1979	19	3	0	0	9	
342	Graeme Atkins	AUS	Wing, Fullback	1975–1982, 1985–1987	137	42	22	0	180	
343	Warren Snodgrass	AUS	Lock	1975–1977	7	0	0	0	0	
344	Mark Levy	AUS	Fullback	1976–1980	84	19	64	1	186	
345	John Peard	AUS	Five-eighth, Lock	1976–1978	59	16	63	0	174	
346	Ray Price	AUS	Lock	1976–1986	258	78	0	0	258	
347	Geoff Hunt	AUS	positions	1976	1	0	0	0	0	
348	Tim Armitstead	AUS	Second-row, Lock	1976	1	0	0	0	0	
349	Randy Attard	AUS		1976	1	0	0	0	0	
350	Graham Murray	AUS	Halfback	1976–1980	46	10	0	0	30	
351	Mick Cronin	AUS	Centre	1977–1986	216	75	865	2	1971	
352	John Maguire	AUS	Prop, Second-row	1977	5	0	0	0	0	
353	Greg Owens	AUS	Centre	1977–1978	7	7	0	0	21	
354	Ken Hey	AUS	Five-eighth, Fullback	1978	11	1	0	0	3	
355	Pat Hundy	AUS	Prop	1978	12	0	0	0	0	
356	Mick Pattison	AUS	Five-eighth	1978–1984	43	16	0	0	50	
357	Richard Quinn	AUS	Prop	1978	7	0	0	0	0	
358	Peter Sterling	AUS	Halfback	1978–1992	227	48	1	15	190	
359	John Mann	AUS	Second-row, Prop	1978	5	2	0	0	6	
360	Lew Platz	AUS	Second-row, Hooker	1978–1980	21	8	0	0	24	
361	Tim Logue	AUS	Hooker	1978	2	0	0	0	0	
362	Steve White	AUS	Fullback	1978	2	1	0	0	3	
363	Glenn Holton	AUS	Five-eighth	1978	3	2	0	1	7	
364	Glenn West	AUS	Centre	1978–1979	20	7	0	0	21	
365	Greg Heddles	AUS	Centre	1978	3	2	0	0	6	
366	Steve Ella	AUS	Centre, Five-eighth, Fullback	1979, 1981–1988	153	94	104	6	552	
367	Doug Hayes	AUS	Prop	1979	1	0	0	0	0	
368	Peter Wynn	AUS	Second-row, Prop	1979–1990	151	42	0	0	148	
369	Eddie Flahey	AUS	Centre	1979	1	0	0	0	0	
370	Neil Hunt	AUS	Wing, Centre	1979–1987	100	46	17	0	23	
371	Cliff Connor	AUS	Lock	1979	2	0	0	0	0	
372	John Chapman	AUS	Wing	1979–1980	19	4	0	0	12	
373	Garry Dowling	AUS	Fullback	1979–1980	37	23	0	0	69	
374	Wayne Woodward	AUS	Second-row, Prop	1979–1980	7	0	0	0	0	
375	Arthur Beetson	AUS	Prop	1979–1980	16	1	0	0	3	
376	Eric Grothe Sr.	AUS	Wing	1979–1989	152	78	0	0	284	
377	Steve Sharp	AUS	Second-row, Hooker	1979–1990	164	7	0	0	27	
378	Steve Edge	AUS	Hooker	1980–1984	117	19	0	0	61	
379	Tony Melrose	AUS	Centre, Five-eighth, Fullback, Wing	1980–1981	17	4	18	4	52	
380	Paul Hunt	AUS	Second-row	1980	3	0	0	0	0	
381	Brett Kenny	AUS	Five-eighth, Centre	1980–1993	264	110	0	0	410	
382	John Muggleton	AUS	Second-row, Centre	1980–1989	114	12	48	2	139	
383	Michael Collins	AUS	Wing	1980–1981	3	0	4	0	8	
384	John Beecher	AUS	Second-row	1981	11					
385	Paul Taylor	AUS	Fullback, Halfback, Hooker	1981–1989	147	30		6	116	
386	Brett Scott	AUS	Five-eighth	1981–1988	25	7		1	29	
387	Kevin Stevens	AUS	Five-eighth, Lock, Second-row	1981	19	1			3	
388	Bruce Grimaldi	AUS	Prop	1981	6					
389	Geoff Coburn	AUS	Prop	1981–1982	20					
390	Warren McDonnell	AUS	positions	1981	1					
391	Steve McKenzie	AUS	Fullback	1981–1982	39	8		5	29	
392	Brad Williams	AUS	Wing	1981–1984	24	8			25	
393	Robert Cowie	AUS	Prop	1981	2					
394	Jeffrey Emery	AUS	Prop	1981–1985	13					
395	Steve Stonham	AUS		1981	3					
396	Paul Younane	AUS	Centre	1981–1984	3					
397	Will Harris	AUS	Centre	1981–1984	9	4			16	
398	Michael Davis	AUS	Halfback	1981–1982	3	1			3	
399	Geoff Green	AUS	Wing	1981–1982	9	1			3	
400	Brett Garnon	AUS	Centre	1981–1988	13		22		44	
401	Gary Howell	AUS	Second-row	1981–1982	4	1			3	
402	Paul Mares	AUS	Prop	1982–1987	69	3			12	
403	John Bilbija	AUS	Second-row	1982	1					
404	Gary Martine	AUS	Lock, Second-row, Five-eighth	1982–1983	18	1			4	
405	Chris Phelan	AUS	Prop, Second-row	1982–1984	34	5			18	
406	Mark Laurie	AUS	Lock, Second-row	1982–1992	205	29			116	
407	Gary Phillips	AUS	Fullback, Wing, Halfback	1982–1985	35					
408	Michael Lans	AUS	Wing	1982	2	1			3	
409	Geoff Bugden	AUS	Prop	1982–1989	100	6			21	
410	Peter Fitzwalter	AUS	Lock	1982	2					
411	Glenn Mansfield	AUS	Second-row, Prop	1982–1988	45	3			12	
412	David Hall	AUS		1982	3					
413	Steve Halliwell	AUS		1982–1983	3	2			8	
414	Stan Jurd	AUS	Prop	1983–1987	85	6			24	
415	Michael Moseley	AUS	Hooker	1983–1989	80	6			24	
416	Don Duffy	AUS		1983–1984	13					
417	Brad Garrett	AUS		1983	4					
418	David Liddiard	AUS	Wing	1983–1985, 1988–1989	63	18			72	
419	John Kambas	AUS		1983	2					
420	Ian Hamer	AUS		1983	2					
421	Tim Welsh	AUS		1983	1					
422	Ron Quinn	AUS		1983–1986	33	5			2	
423	Wayne Morrow	AUS		1983	1					
424	Digby Murray	AUS		1983	2					
425	Greg Henry	AUS		1983–1985	8					
426	Ken Stewart	AUS	Hooker	1984–1985	10					
427	Neil Pengilley	AUS		1984	4					
428	Chris Houghton	AUS	Wing, Centre	1984	5					
429	Nathan Gibbs	AUS	Second-row	1984	2	2			8	
430	Keith Rugg	AUS	Wing, Fullback	1984	3		4		8	
431	Blair Kurtz	AUS		1984–1987	2					
432	Gary Mara	AUS	Centre	1984	2		3		6	
433	Vince Carr	AUS	Hooker	1984–1986	5					
434	Graham Settree	AUS	Second-row	1984–1988	27	3			12	
435	Stephen Broughton	AUS	Wing	1985	4					
436	Don Price	AUS	Second-row, Lock, Prop	1985–1987	7	1			4	
437	Matt Carter	AUS	Centre	1985	4	1			4	
438	Michael Eden	AUS	Utility back	1985–1987	27	3	24	1	61	
439	Tony Chalmers	AUS	Wing	1985–1988	51	15			60	
440	Peter Ford	AUS	Second-row	1985–1988	47	3			12	
441	Phil Crowe	AUS		1985	1	1			4	
442	Jeremy Lillis	AUS		1985–1987	26					
443	Brian Jackson	AUS	Centre	1985–1991	86	34			136	
444	Terry Leabeater	AUS	Prop	1986–1988	48				0	
445	Tim Barnes	AUS		1986	5	1			4	
446	Tony Cosatto	AUS	Centre	1986–1989	14	1	4		12	
447	David Rowles	AUS		1986	1					
448	Mick Delroy	AUS	Wing, Fullback	1986–1988	47	10			40	
449	Mark Ko'cass	AUS	Halfback	1986	3					
450	Steve Corradi	AUS		1986	1					
451	Ernie Garland	AUS	Hooker	1987	5					
452	Louis Takaraingi	AUS	Wing	1987	3	1			4	
453	Bob Lindner	AUS	Lock	1987–1988	28	10			40	
454	Jeff Perl	AUS	Wing	1987	2	1	3		1	
455	Ken Wolffe	AUS	Centre	1987	8	1			4	
456	Danny Crnkovich	AUS	Wing, Fullback	1987–1995	80	23		2	94	
457	Michael Erickson	AUS	Wing, Centre	1987–1995	112	31			124	
458	Rod Slater	AUS	Prop	1987–1989	15	0	10		20	
459	Mark Barnes	AUS	Five-eighth, Hooker	1987–1991	42	2			8	
460	David Perry	AUS		1987	1					
461	Gary Vernon	AUS	Prop	1988–1990	16	1			4	
462	Craig Izzard	AUS	Second-row	1988–1990	45	6			24	
463	Mark Clinton	AUS	Prop	1988–1991	47	1			4	
464	Mark Robinson	AUS	Wing	1988–1989	11	1			4	
465	David Black	AUS	Centre	1988	6	1			4	
466	Glen Liddiard	AUS	Fullback, Five-eighth	1988–1991	46	17	12		92	
467	Brett Atkins	AUS	Wing	1988–1989	24	3			12	
468	George Bartlett	AUS	Second-row	1988–1991	8					
469	Scott Mahon	AUS	Fullback, Wing	1988–1996	99	26	4		184	
470	Andrew Fitzhenry	AUS	Fullback, Halfback	1989–1992	35	3	56		13	
471	Andrew Langford	AUS	Second-row	1989–1993	40	1			4	
472	Peter Martin	AUS	Hooker, Second-row	1989	6					
473	David Woods	AUS	Centre	1989–1996	97	25			1	
474	Jeremy Ticehurst	AUS	Wing	1989	13	3			12	
475	Gavin Catanach	AUS	Prop	1989–1992	7					
476	Greg Drake	AUS	Prop	1989–1992	65	2			8	
477	Andrew Leeds	AUS	Fullback, Centre	1989–1991	44	6	82		188	
478	Mark Bugden	AUS	Hooker	1989–1990	22	4			16	
479	Peter Johnston	AUS	Prop	1989–1991, 1996–1997	69	7			28	
480	Jason Bell	AUS	Halfback, Five-eighth, Centre	1989–1992, 1997–1999	106	23		1	93	
481	Paul Kent	AUS	Halfback	1989	1					
482	Danny Mamo	AUS	Halfback	1989	1					
483	Matt Goodwin	AUS	Prop	1990–1991	24					
484	Mark Horo	NZL	Second-row	1990–1994	62	6			24	
485	Ian Gately	AUS	Prop	1990–1991	10	1	3		1	
486	Matt Munro	AUS	Second-row	1990–1991	8					
487	Bill Greentree	AUS	Hooker	1990–1993	28	3			12	
488	Joe Bartolo	AUS	Wing	1990–1995	57	17			68	
489	David Penna	AUS	Halfback	1990–2000	78	13		3	55	
490	Robert Muchmore	AUS	Wing, Second-row	1990–1996	71	7			28	
491	Martin Seal	AUS	Halfback	1991–1992	3	1			4	
492	John Fearnley	AUS	Prop	1991–1994	76	2			8	
493	Chris King	AUS	Second-row	1991–1997	96	9			36	
494	David Barrett	AUS		1991–1992	6					
495	Rod Collins	AUS	Wing	1991–1994	13	2			8	
496	Paul Quinn	AUS	Second-row	1991–1992	11					
497	Phil Adamson	AUS	Second-row	1991–1992	2					
498	Matt Adamson	AUS	Fullback	1991	3					
499	Ryan Schofield	AUS	Hooker	1991–1993	16	1			4	
500	Tony Sakr	AUS		1991	1					
501	Scott Hodson	AUS		1991	1					
502	Cameron Blair	AUS	Second-row	1992–1995	80	7			28	
503	Michael Buettner	AUS	Centre, Five-eighth	1992–2002	129	29	73		262	
504	Lee Oudenryn	AUS	Wing	1992–1995	50	18	37		146	
505	Tom Brown	AUS	Fullback	1992	3					
506	Stu Galbraith	AUS	Halfback	1992–1994	38	4			16	
507	Phil Tiernan	AUS	Prop	1992–1993	6					
508	Shane Flanagan	AUS	Hooker	1992–1994	33	1			4	
509	Pat O'Doherty	AUS	Prop	1992	6					
510	Paul Dunn	AUS	Prop	1993–1995	60	1	0	0	4	
511	Michael Speechley	AUS	Five-eighth, Lock	1993–1995	33	2	0	0	8	
512	Dallas Weston	AUS	Prop	1993–2000	68	3	0	0	12	
513	Tulsen Tollett	ENG	Halfback, Hooker	1993–1995	39	5	0	1	21	
514	Darren Winmill	AUS		1993	10	0	0	0	0	
515	Peter McPhail	AUS	Lock, Hooker	1993–1995	40	8	0	0	32	
516	Jason Stewart	AUS	Lock	1993	7	0	0	0	0	
517	James Ferguson	AUS		1993	1	0	0	0	0	
518	Darren Capovilla	AUS	Prop	1993	1	0	0	0	0	
519	Andrew Hill	AUS		1993	1	0	0	0	0	
520	Keith Blackett	AUS	Five-eighth	1994–1996	25	3	25		62	
521	Andy Patmore	AUS	Centre	1994	2	0	0	0	0	
522	Brett Plowman	AUS	Wing	1994–1995	23	5	0	0	20	
523	Wayne Simonds	AUS	Wing	1994	2	1	0	0	4	
524	Paul Clarke	AUS	Prop	1994–1995	36	3	0	0	12	
525	Phil Howlett	TON	Wing	1994–1995	15	6	0	0	24	
526	Chris Lawler	AUS	Halfback, Wing	1994–1998	49	17	98	0	264	
527	Marty McKenzie	AUS	Prop	1994–1996	36	1	0	0	4	
528	Darrell Williams	NZL	Centre, Wing	1994	5	0	0	0	0	
529	John Frare	ITA	Halfback, Wing	1994–1995	17	4	3	0	22	
530	Iva Ropati	NZL	Centre, Wing	1994	4	2	0	0	8	
531	Garen Casey	AUS	Centre	1994	8	5	0	0	20	
532	Abby Roberts	AUS		1994	1	0	0	0	0	
533	James Hinchey	AUS		1994	2	0	0	0	0	
534	Duncan De Celis	AUS		1994–1995	5	0	0	0	0	
535	Craig Freer	AUS	Halfback, Five-eighth	1994–1995	7	0	0	0	0	
536	Troy Campbell	AUS	Hooker, Second-row	1994–1997	63	3	0	0	12	
537	Chris Cranney	AUS		1994–1995	2	0	0	0	0	
538	Justin Morgan	AUS	Prop, Second-row	1994–1999	83	10	0	0	40	
539	Jamie Mahon	AUS		1994–1996	8	0	0	0	0	
540	John Brewer	AUS		1995	5	0	0	0	0	
541	Kaleveti Naisoro	FIJ		1995	3	0	0	0	0	
542	Matthew Spence	AUS		1995–1998	35	4	0	0	16	
543	Brad Nairn	AUS		1995	1	0	0	0	0	
544	Nathan Carr	AUS		1995	2	0	0	0	0	
545	Ray Mercy	AUS		1995	9	1	0	0	4	
546	Vince Fawcett	ENG		1995–1996	14	3	0	0	12	
547	Michael Tamati	AUS		1995	1	0	0	0	0	
548	Michael Wicks	AUS		1995	2	0	0	0	0	
549	Danny Grimley	AUS		1995	1	0	0	0	0	
550	Michael Appleby	AUS	Wing	1995	2	0	0	0	0	
551	Dean Sampson	ENG	Prop	1995	6	2	0	0	8	
552	Russell Wyer	AUS	Centre, Wing	1995–1997	25	8	1	0	34	
553	Michael Corrie	AUS		1995	1	0	2	0	4	
554	Tito Niumata	AUS		1995	1	0	0	0	0	
555	Nathan Barnes	AUS	Fullback, Wing	1996–1999	69	20	1	0	82	
556	Scott Davey	AUS		1996	4	1	0	0	4	
557	Jim Dymock	TON→AUS	Lock, Five-eighth	1996–2000	112	12	0	1	49	
558	Gary Freeman	NZL		1996	21	2	0	0	8	
559	Jarrod McCracken	NZL	Centre, Second-row	1996–1999	75	16	0	0	64	
560	Dean Pay	AUS	Prop, Second-row	1996–1999	76	6	1	0	26	
561	Aaron Raper	AUS	Hooker	1996–1998	39	4	0	0	16	
562	Adam Ritson	AUS	Prop	1996	11	1	0	0	4	
563	Jason Smith	AUS	Lock, Second-row, Five-eighth	1996–2000	89	24	0	4	100	
564	Stuart Kelly	AUS		1996–2000	96	29	0	0	116	
565	Rod Maybon	AUS	Fullback	1996	19	5	0	0	20	
566	Anthony Bonus	AUS		1996	7	0	0	0	0	
567	Darren Pettet	AUS		1996–1997	6	0	0	0	0	
568	Shane Russell	AUS		1996	8	2		0	8	
569	David Anderson	AUS		1996	1	0	0	0	0	
570	Steven Jolly	AUS	Halfback	1996	1	0	0	0	0	
571	Simon Scanlan	AUS	Centre	1996	1	1	0	0	4	
572	Steven Crouch	AUS	Second-row	1996	1	0	0	0	0	
573	David Riolo	AUS	Fullback	1997	13	1	0	0	4	
574	John Simon	AUS	Halfback	1997–1999	45	12	26	13	113	
575	Shane Whereat	AUS	Wing	1997–1999	38	25	0	0	100	
576	Ian Herron	AUS	Wing	1997–1998	15	4	32	0	80	
577	Karl Lovell	AUS	Centre, Second-row	1997–1998	37	7	1	0	3	
578	Steve Collins	AUS		1997	17	7	0	0	28	
579	Paul Carige	AUS	Centre, Wing, Fullback	1997–1998	45	13	0	0	52	
580	Brett Horsnell	AUS	Lock	1997–1998	34	1	0	0	4	
581	Daniel Brown	AUS		1997	5	0	0	0	0	
582	Nathan Koina	AUS		1997	4	0	0	0	0	
583	Eparama Navale	FIJ		1997–1998	16	8	0	0	32	
584	Andrew Frew	AUS	Wing, Centre	1997–1998	3	1	0	0	4	
585	Nathan Cayless	NZL	Prop, Second-row	1997–2010	259	28	0	1	113	
586	Leon Douglas	AUS		1997	1	0	0	0	0	
587	Jamie Smith	AUS		1997	4	0	0	0	0	
588	Dennis Moran	AUS		1997–2000	36	8	0	0	32	
589	Jamie Owens	AUS		1998	11	0	0	1	1	
590	Clinton Schifcofske	AUS	Fullback	1998–2000	72	21	18	0	444	
591	Troy Pezet	AUS	Centre, Five-eighth	1998	9	1	0	0	4	
592	Mark Tookey	AUS	Prop	1998–1999	40	4	0	0	16	
593	Julian Troy	AUS	Prop	1998	9	1	0	0	4	
594	Andrew Carige	AUS		1998	2	0	0	0	0	
595	Nathan Hindmarsh	AUS	Second-row, Prop	1998–2012	330	60	1	0	242	
596	Michael Vella	AUS	Prop, Second-row	1998–2006	159	13	0	0	52	
597	Michael Hodgson	AUS	Second-row	1998–2000	20	4	0	0	16	
598	Casey McGuire	AUS	Five-eighth, Hooker, Halfback	1998, 2011–2012	4	0	0	0	16	
599	David Kidwell	NZL	Second-row	1999–2000	33	8	0	0	32	
600	Chris Quinn	AUS	Second-row	1999	16	1	0	0	4	
601	Daniel Wagon	AUS	Lock, Second-row	1999–2008	204	43	0	0	172	
602	Luke Burt	AUS	Fullback, Wing, Centre	1999–2012	264	124	646	5	1793	
603	Dean Schifilliti	AUS	Hooker	1999–2000	30	1	0	0	4	
604	Ben Kusto	AUS	Five-eighth	1999–2002	30	7	0	2	30	
605	Ian Hindmarsh	AUS	Second-row	1999–2002, 2007	95	14	0	1	57	
606	Tim Patterson	AUS		1999	1	0	0	0	0	
607	David Vaealiki	NZL	Fullback, Centre, Wing	1999–2004	92	32	0	0	128	
608	Eric Grothe Jr.	AUS	Wing	1999–2000, 2004–2010	131	65	0	0	264	
609	Jay Bandy	AUS		1999	1	0	0	0	0	
610	Jason Moodie	AUS	Wing	2000–2003	87	44	2	0	180	
611	David Westley	PNG	Prop	2000–2001	33	1	0	0	4	
612	Brett Hodgson	AUS	Fullback	2000–2003	73	36	106	0	356	
613	Gary Larson	AUS	Prop	2000	17	1	0	0	4	
614	Wade L'Estrange	AUS		2000	6	0	0	0	0	
615	Andrew Ryan	AUS	Second-row, Prop, Lock	2000–2002	73	16	0	0	64	
616	Troy Wozniak	AUS	Second-row, Centre, Prop	2000–2001	10	1	0	0	4	
617	Chad Robinson	AUS	Second-row, Lock	2000–2001, 2005–2008	89	9	0	0	36	
618	PJ Marsh	AUS	Hooker, Halfback	2000–2001, 2005–2007	112	16	0	1	65	
619	Pat Richards	AUS	Wing, Fullback, Centre	2000–2003	37	14	4	0	64	
620	Daniel Irvine	AUS	Hooker	2000–2003	35	4	0	0	16	
621	Jason Cayless	AUS	Prop	2000–2002	24	0	0	0	0	
622	Jamie Lyon	AUS	Centre	2000–2004	70	36	0	0	144	
623	John Wilson	AUS	Centre, Five-eighth	2000	3	0	0	0	0	
624	Adam Wheeler	AUS	Prop	2000	1	0	0	0	0	
625	Brad Drew	AUS	Hooker, Halfback, Second-row	2001–2002	45	6	6	1	37	
626	Jason Taylor	AUS	Halfback	2001	26	8	116	1	265	
627	David Solomona	NZL	Second-row, Lock, Five-eighth	2001–2002	57	6	0	0	24	
628	Alex Chan	NZL	Prop, Second-row	2001–2003	26	2	0	0	8	
629	Adrian Rainey	AUS	Second-row, Prop	2001	2	0	0	0	0	
630	Scott Donald	AUS	Wing	2001–2002	21	15	0	0	60	
631	Danny Sullivan	AUS	Second-row	2001–2003	5	0	0	0	0	
632	Ben Duckworth	AUS		2001	2	1	0	0	4	
633	Andrew McFadden	AUS	Halfback	2002	21	4	0	0	16	
634	Dean Widders	AUS	Second-row, Lock, Five-eighth	2002–2006	112	28	0	0	112	
635	Adam Dykes	AUS	Five-eighth, Halfback	2002–2004	38	11	5	2	56	
636	Daniel Heckenberg	AUS	Prop	2002–2003	40	1	0	0	4	
637	James Webster	AUS	Halfback	2002–2004	22	3	0	0	12	
638	Adam Mogg	AUS	Centre, Five-eighth, Wing	2002	9	2	0	0	8	
639	Andrew Meads	AUS		2002–2003	8	0	0	0	0	
640	Jamie Russo	AUS	Five-eighth	2002	2	0	0	0	0	
641	Willie Tonga	AUS	Centre, Wing	2012	40	8	0	0	32	
642	Ashley Graham	AUS	Centre, Wing	2002–2006	41	18	0	0	72	
643	Matthew Petersen	AUS	Wing	2002–2006	65	38	0	0	152	
644	Trent Robinson	AUS		2002	1	0	0	0	0	
645	Nathan Hollingsworth	AUS	Hooker	2002	5	1	0	0	4	
646	Paul Green	AUS	Halfback	2003	7	0	0	0	0	
647	Lee Hopkins	AUS	Second-row, Lock, Hooker	2003–2004	37	10	0	0	40	
648	John Morris	AUS	Hooker, Five-eighth, Halfback	2003–2006	92	18	1	3	95	
649	Adam Peek	AUS	Second-row, Prop	2003–2006	48	4	0	0	16	
650	Shayne Dunley	AUS		2003–2003	14	3	0	0	12	
651	Chris Armit	AUS	Prop, Lock	2003	15	1	0	0	4	
652	Kylie Leuluai	NZL	Prop	2003	7	0	0	0	0	
653	Michael Witt	AUS	Five-eighth, Halfback	2003–2004	27	6	75	2	176	
654	Darren Treacy	AUS	Second-row	2003	15	0	0	0	0	
655	Nathan McMillan	AUS		2003	1	0	0	0	0	
656	Ronald Prince	AUS		2003–2004	5	1	0	0	4	
657	William Leyshon	AUS		2003	2	0	0	0	0	
658	Justin Tsoulos	AUS	Prop	2003–2007	26	2	0	0	8	
659	Wise Kativerata	FIJ	Wing	2004	2	0	0	0	0	
660	Corey Pearson	AUS		2004	13	0	0	0	0	
661	Aaron Cannings	AUS	Prop	2004–2007	38	2	0	0	8	
662	Craig Stapleton	AUS	Prop	2004	23	1	0	0	4	
663	Luke O'Dwyer	AUS	Centre, Lock	2004–2006	26	10	0	0	40	
664	Junior Langi	NZL	Centre	2004	16	2	0	0	8	
665	Fuifui Moimoi	NZL	Prop	2004–2014	201	22	0	0	88	
666	Shane Muspratt	AUS	Hooker	2004	6	1	0	0	4	
667	Wade McKinnon	AUS	Fullback	2004–2006	51	15	0	0	60	
668	Chris Thorman	ENG	Halfback, Five-eighth	2004	11	1	1	0	6	
669	Chris Muckert	AUS	Lock	2004	4	1	0	0	4	
670	Jack Afamasaga	NZL	Second-row, Lock, Prop	2004–2006	11	0	0	0	0	
671	Brett Anderson	AUS	Wing, Centre	2004	3	0	0	0	0	
672	Malupo Kaufusi	TON	Prop	2004	1	0	0	0	0	
673	Feleti Mateo	TON	Lock, Five-eighth, Second-row	2004–2010	88	20	0	0	80	
674	Ben Smith	AUS	Centre, Second-row, Lock	2004–2014	152	37	0	0	148	
675	Glenn Morrison	AUS	Second-row, Lock	2005–2006	45	15	0	0	60	
676	Mark Riddell	AUS	Hooker	2005–2008	86	14	28	0	112	
677	Tim Smith	AUS	Halfback, Five-eighth	2005–2008	71	11	1	0	46	
678	Paul Stringer	AUS	Prop	2005–2006	32	1	0	0	4	
679	Timana Tahu	AUS	Centre, Wing, Second-row	2005–2007, 2010	63	25	0	0	100	
680	Henry Perenara	AUS	Lock	2005–2006	11	1	0	0	4	
681	Ian Henderson	SCO	Hooker	2005	1	0	0	0	0	
682	John Williams	AUS	Wing, Centre	2005–2006	6	5	0	0	20	
683	Joel Reddy	AUS	Wing, Centre, Fullback	2005–2011	90	38	0	0	152	
684	Brett Delaney	AUS	Centre	2005–2006	18	4	27	0	70	
685	Josh Cordoba	AUS	Prop	2006–2009	60	2	0	0	8	
686	Peter Lewis	NZL	Centre	2006	2	0	0	0	0	
687	Zeb Taia	NZL	Second-row, Lock	2006–2007	6	2	0	0	8	
688	Marcus Perenara	AUS	Halfback	2006	1	0	0	0	0	
689	Jeremy Smith	NZL	Halfback, Five-eighth	2006	13	1	0	0	4	
690	Jarryd Hayne	FIJ→AUS	Fullback, Wing, Centre, Five-eighth	2006–2014, 2018	191	113	2	3	459	
691	Brett Finch	AUS	Five-eighth, Halfback	2007–2009	51	7	0	2	30	
692	Todd Lowrie	AUS	Second-row, Lock, Centre	2007–2009	42	2	0	0	8	
693	Richard Faʻaoso	TON	Prop, Second-row	2007	6	0	0	0	0	
694	Blake Green	AUS	Halfback, Five-eighth, Lock	2007	6	0	0	0	0	
695	Krisnan Inu	NZL	Centre, Wing, Fullback	2007–2010	78	37	60	0	268	
696	Junior Paulo	AUS	Prop, Second-row	2007–2009	17	0	0	0	0	
697	Weller Hauraki	NZL	Second-row	2007–2009	32	4	0	0	16	
698	Taulima Tautai	NZL	Centre, Wing	2008–2009	22	8	0	0	32	
699	Joe Galuvao	NZL	Second-row, Prop, Lock	2008–2009	34	4	0	0	16	
700	Matt Keating	AUS	Hooker	2008–2013	130	9	0	0	36	
701	Brendan Oake	AUS	Prop, Second-row	2008–2010	22	0	0	0	0	
702	Kris Keating	AUS	Five-eighth	2008–2010	41	4	3	0	22	
703	Tony Williams	TON→AUS	Wing	2008, 2018	16	4	0	0	16	
704	Broderick Wright	AUS	Second-row, Prop	2008–2009	13	0	0	0	0	
705	Tim Mannah	LEB	Prop	2009–2019	233	6	0	0	24	
706	Jeff Robson	AUS	Halfback, Hooker, Five-eighth	2009–2011, 2016–2017	71	11	0	0	44	
707	Etu Uaisele	TON	Wing, Centre, Fullback	2009–2011	16	3	0	0	12	
708	Jeremy Latimore	AUS	Prop, Second-row	2009	7	0	0	0	0	
709	Kevin Kingston	AUS	Hooker	2009	19	2	0	0	8	
710	Daniel Mortimer	AUS	Five-eighth, Halfback, Hooker	2009–2011	48	12	0	0	48	
711	Taniela Lasalo	TON	Second-row, Centre, Lock, Prop	2009–2014	40	3	0	0	12	
712	Jonathan Wright	AUS	Centre, Wing	2009–2010	12	3	0	0	12	
713	Justin Poore	AUS	Prop	2010–2012	50	1	0	0	4	
714	Shane Shackleton	AUS	Second-row, Prop	2010–2012	24	1	0	0	4	
715	Justin Horo	NZL	Prop, Second-row, Lock	2010–2012	52	7	0	0	28	
716	Tom Humble	AUS	Utility back	2010	6	2	0	0	8	
717	Pele Peletelese	NZL	Prop	2010	1	0	0	0	0	
718	Manase Manuokafoa	TON	Prop, Second-row	2010–2011	2	0	0	0	0	
719	Lee Te Maari	NZL	Lock, Second-row	2010	1	0	0	0	0	
720	Anthony Mitchell	AUS	Hooker	2010–2011	7	2	0	0	8	
721	Mitchell Allgood	AUS	Prop, Second-row	2011–2014	70	0	0	0	0	
722	Ryan Morgan	AUS	Centre, Wing	2011–2015	84	29	0	0	116	
723	Chris Walker	AUS	Wing, Fullback, Centre	2011	5	2	0	0	8	
724	Chris Hicks	AUS	Wing, Centre, Fullback	2011	7	3	0	0	12	
725	Paul Whatuira	NZL	Centre	2011	1	0	0	0	0	
726	Billy Rogers	AUS	Lock, Second-row	2011	5	0	0	0	0	
727	Carl Webb	AUS	Prop, Second-row	2011	6	0	0	0	0	
728	Jordan Atkins	AUS	Wing, Centre, Fullback	2011	12	3	0	0	12	
729	Jacob Loko	AUS	Centre, Wing, Lock, Second-row	2011–2013	23	4	0	0	16	
730	Reni Maitua	AUS→SAM	Lock, Second-row	2011–2013	53	6	0	0	24	
731	Pat O'Hanlon	AUS	Second-row, Lock	2011–2013	20	1	0	0	4	
732	Joseph Paulo	SAM→USA	Lock, Second-row	2011–2015	86	2	9	0	26	
733	Rory Brien	AUS	Lock, Centre, Second-row	2011	1	0	0	0	0	
734	Ken Sio	AUS	Wing, Fullback, Centre	2011–2014	57	37	0	0	148	
735	Cheyse Blair	AUS	Centre, Wing	2012–2013	28	7	0	0	28	
736	Ben Roberts	NZL→SAM	Five-eighth	2012–2013	37	2	1	0	10	
737	Chris Sandow	AUS	Halfback, Fullback	2012–2015	75	15	135	5	335	
738	Esikeli Tonga	TON	Centre, Wing	2012	3	0	0	0	0	
739	Matthew Ryan	AUS	Second-row, Lock	2012–2013	24	4	0	0	16	
740	Luke Kelly	AUS	Five-eighth, Halfback	2012–2016	41	3	14	0	42	
741	Jake Mullaney	AUS	Fullback, Five-eighth	2012–2013	18	5	6	0	32	
742	Nathan Smith	AUS	Hooker	2012	9	1	0	0	4	
743	Darcy Lussick	AUS	Second-row, Prop, Lock	2013–2015	53	0	0	0	0	
744	Kelepi Tanginoa	AUS	Second-row, Lock	2013–2014	13	0	0	0	0	
745	Vai Toutai	TON	Wing, Centre	2013–2016	34	15	0	0	60	
746	Peni Terepo	TON	Prop, Lock, Second-row	2013–2020	123	6	0	0	24	
747	Kaysa Pritchard	SAM	Hooker, Lock, Second-row	2013–2018	47	4	0	0	16	
748	Api Pewhairangi	IRE	Centre, Five-eighth	2013	4	0	0	0	0	
749	Junior Paulo	AUS	Prop	2013–2016, 2019–	221	17	0	0	68	
750	Brayden Wiliame	FIJ	Centre, Wing, Fullback	2013	6	3	0	0	12	
751	Daniel Harrison	AUS	Second-row, Lock, Five-eighth	2013	7	0	0	0	0	
752	Semi Radradra	FIJ	Wing	2013–2017	94	82	1	0	330	
753	Kenny Edwards	NZL	Lock, Second-row, Hooker	2013–2018	70	6	0	0	24	
754	Joseph Ualesi	AUS	Lock, Second-row	2013	1	0	0	0	0	
755	William Hopoate	TON	Wing, Centre, Fullback	2014–2015	38	7	0	0	28	
756	Corey Norman	AUS	Five-eighth, Fullback, Halfback	2014–2018	107	14	3	1	63	
757	Nathan Peats	AUS	Hooker, Second-row, Lock	2014–2016	35	8	0	0	32	
758	Manu Maʻu	TON→NZL	Second-row, Lock	2014–2019	115	15	1	0	62	
759	David Gower	AUS	Second-row, Prop, Lock	2014–2020	101	6	0	0	24	
760	Pauli Pauli	AUS	Second-row, Prop	2014–2015	33	3	0	0	12	
761	Justin Hunt	AUS	Fullback	2014	1	0	0	0	0	
762	Lee Mossop	ENG	Prop	2014	3	0	0	0	0	
763	Isaac De Gois	POR	Hooker	2014–2017	51	4	0	0	16	
764	Tepai Moeroa	NZL→COK	Second-row, Prop	2014–2019	112	9	0	0	36	
765	Bureta Faraimo	USA	Wing	2014–2016	15	9	0	0	36	
766	Beau Champion	AUS	Centre	2015	2	0	0	0	0	
767	Brad Takairangi	COK	Centre, Second-row, Five-eighth, Lock	2015–2020	110	21	0	0	84	
768	Reece Robinson	AUS	Wing, Fullback	2015	20	9	10	0	56	
769	Anthony Watmough	AUS	Lock, Second-row	2015	17	1	0	0	4	
770	Danny Wicks	AUS	Prop	2015–2016	39	3	0	0	12	
771	John Folau	TON	Centre, Second-row	2015–2017	8	4	0	0	16	
772	Daniel Alvaro	AUS→ITA	Prop, Second-row	2015–2020	89	6	0	0	24	
773	Cody Nelson	AUS	Second-row	2015–2017	3	0	0	0	0	
774	Michael Gordon	AUS	Fullback, Wing	2016	24	5	71	0	162	
775	Michael Jennings	TON→AUS	Centre	2016–2020	105	42	0	0	168	
776	Clinton Gutherson	AUS	Fullback, Centre, Five-eighth	2016–2024	206	96	152	1	689	
777	Beau Scott	AUS	Second-row	2016–2018	44	3	0	0	12	
778	Kieran Foran	NZL	Five-eighth	2016	9	1	0	0	4	
779	Bevan French	AUS	Fullback, Wing	2016–2019	47	35	0	0	140	
780	Rory O'Brien	AUS	Prop	2016–2017	11	0	0	0	0	
781	Josh Hoffman	NZL	Wing, Centre	2017–2019	31	15	0	0	60	
782	Suaia Matagi	SAM→NZL	Prop	2017–2018	35	0	0	0	0	
783	Nathan Brown	ITA	Prop, Lock	2017–2022	109	5	0	0	20	
784	Frank Pritchard	NZL→SAM	Second-row	2017	8	0	0	0	0	
785	Siosaia Vave	TON	Prop	2017–2018	30	3	0	0	12	
786	Kirisome Auva'a	SAM	Wing, Centre	2017–2018	22	9	0	0	36	
787	Will Smith	AUS	Fullback, Five-eighth, Halfback	2017–2021	54	9	0	0	36	
788	Mitchell Moses	LEB	Five-eighth, Halfback	2017–	182	40	504	12	1180	
789	Nathan Davis	AUS	Wing, Centre	2017	1	0	0	0	0	
790	Cameron King	AUS	Hooker	2017–2018	22	0	0	0	0	
791	Kane Evans	FIJ	Prop	2018–2020	43	5	0	0	20	
792	George Jennings	TON	Wing	2018–2020	24	11	0	0	44	
793	Marata Niukore	COK	Second-row	2018–2022	97	9	0	0	36	
794	Reed Mahoney	AUS	Hooker	2018–2022	101	19	0	0	72	
795	Jaeman Salmon	AUS	Five-eighth	2018–2019	17	1	0	0	4	
796	Oregon Kaufusi	AUS	Prop	2018–2022	72	3	0	0	12	
797	Ray Stone	AUS	Lock, Hooker	2018–2022	31	4	0	0	16	
798	Dylan Brown	AUS	Five-eighth, Centre	2019–2025	142	37	1	0	150	
799	Blake Ferguson	AUS	Wing	2019–2021	57	24	1	0	98	
800	Shaun Lane	AUS	Second-row	2019–2025	138	21	0	0	84	
801	Maika Sivo	FIJ	Wing	2019–2024	115	104	0	0	416	
802	Ethan Parry	AUS	Wing	2019	2	2	0	0	8	
803	Waqa Blake	FIJ	Centre	2019–2023	77	28	0	0	112	
804	Reagan Campbell-Gillard	AUS	Prop	2020–2024	107	13	1	0	54	
805	Ryan Matterson	AUS	Second-row	2020–	94	11	0	0	44	
806	Jai Field	AUS	Halfback	2020	6	3	0	0	12	
807	Stefano Utoikamanu	NZL	Prop	2020	3	0	0	0	0	
808	Andrew Davey	AUS	Prop	2020, 2023	21	2	0	0	8	
809	Haze Dunster	NZL	Wing	2020–2025	19	3	0	0	12	
810	Keegan Hipgrave	AUS	Second-row, Lock	2021	9	0	0	0	0	
811	Tom Opacic	AUS	Centre	2021–2022	40	14	0	0	56	
812	Isaiah Papali'i	NZL	Second-row, Lock	2021–2022	53	17	0	0	68	
813	Bryce Cartwright	AUS	Second-row, Lock	2021–2025	73	15	0	0	60	
814	Wiremu Greig	NZL	Prop	2021–2025	27	1	0	0	4	
815	Jake Arthur	AUS	Five-eighth	2021–2023	20	3	0	0	12	
816	Joey Lussick	AUS	Hooker	2021-2025	38	8	0	0	32	
817	Sean Russell	AUS	Wing	2021–	70	28	19	0	150	
818	Nathaniel Roache	NZL	Hooker	2021	1	0	0	0	0	
819	Will Penisini	TON	Centre	2021–	105	39	0	0	176	
820	Makahesi Makatoa	COK	Prop, Lock, Second-row	2021–2024	56	1	0	0	4	
821	Michael Oldfield	TON	Wing	2021	2	0	0	0	0	
822	Samuel Loizou	AUS	Wing	2021	1	0	0	0	0	
823	Hayze Perham	NZL	Wing, Fullback	2021–2022	7	4	0	0	16	
824	Ky Rodwell	AUS	Prop, Lock	2021–2022	5	0	0	0	0	
825	Bailey Simonsson	NZL	Wing	2022–	61	20	0	0	80	
826	Mitch Rein	AUS	Hooker	2022	2	0	0	0	0	
827	Ofahiki Ogden	NZL	Prop	2022–2024	13	1	0	0	4	
828	Matt Doorey	AUS	Second-row	2023–	36	3	0	0	12	
829	Josh Hodgson	ENG	Hooker	2023	12	1	0	0	4	
830	J'maine Hopgood	AUS	Lock	2023–	62	7	0	0	28	
831	Isaac Lumelume	FIJ	Wing	2023	2	0	0	0	0	
832	Jirah Momoisea	NZL	Second-row	2023	3	0	0	0	0	
833	Jack Murchie	AUS	Second-row	2023	5	0	0	0	0	
834	Brendan Hands	AUS	Hooker	2023–2025	40	2	0	0	8	
835	Joe Ofahengaue	AUS	Prop, Second-row	2023–2025	41	3	0	0	12	
836	Luca Moretti	ITA	Second-row	2023–	42	3	0	0	12	
837	Daejarn Asi	NZL	Five-eighth	2023–2024	24	3	17	1	47	
838	Arthur Miller-Stephen	AUS	Wing	2023–	1	1	0	0	4	
839	Morgan Harper	NZL	Centre, Wing	2024	8	4	0	0	16	
840	Kelma Tuilagi	SAM	Second-row	2024–	36	7	0	0	28	
841	Blaize Talagi	NZL	Centre, Five-eighth	2024	20	11	0	0	44	
842	Ethan Sanders	AUS	Five-eighth	2024	2	0	0	0	0	
843	Matt Arthur	AUS	Hooker	2024	3	0	0	0	0	
844	Jake Tago	AUS	Centre	2024–	9	5	0	0	20	
845	Charlie Guymer	AUS	Second-row	2024–	26	3	0	0	12	
846	Lorenzo Mulitalo	AUS	Wing	2024	1	0	0	0	0	
847	Dan Keir	AUS	Lock	2024–2025	7	0	0	0	0	
848	Isaiah Iongi	AUS→TON	Fullback	2025–	25	10	0	0	40	
849	Zac Lomax	AUS	Wing	2025	19	9	53	1	143	
850	Ronald Volkman	SAM	Halfback	2025–	8	3	3	0	18	
851	Jack Williams	AUS	Lock, Prop	2025–	32	2	0	0	8	
852	Ryley Smith	AUS	Hooker	2025–	31	2	1	0	10	
853	Sam Tuivaiti	AUS	Prop	2025–	25	1	0	0	4	
854	Jordan Samrani	AUS	Wing, Centre	2025–	17	5	0	0	20	
855	Kitione Kautoga	FIJ	Second-row	2025–	21	3	0	0	12	
856	Dean Hawkins	AUS	Halfback	2025	12	2	0	0	8	
857	Josh Addo-Carr	AUS	Wing	2025–	32	25	0	0	100	
858	Dylan Walker	AUS	Five-eighth, Lock, Centre	2025–	31	3	0	0	12	
859	Toni Mataele	AUS	Second-row	2025–	5	0	0	0	0	
860	Joash Papali'i	AUS	Fullback	2025–	26	6	3	0	30	
861	Tallyn Da Silva	AUS	Hooker	2025–	20	5	0	0	20	
862	Jack de Belin	AUS→PNG	Lock, Prop	2026–	8	0	0	0	0	
863	Brian Kelly	AUS	Centre, Wing	2026–	9	2	0	0	8	
864	Jonah Pezet	AUS	Five-eighth, Halfback	2026–	5	2	0	0	8	
865	Te Hurinui Twidle	NZL	Fullback	2026–	1	2	0	0	8	
866	Araz Nanva	AUS	Wing, Centre	2026–	2	0	0	0	0	
867	Saxon Pryke	AUS	Lock	2026–	5	0	0	0	0	
