= George Robertson =

George Robertson may refer to:

== Politicians ==
- George Robertson (congressman) (1790–1874), U.S. Representative from Kentucky
- George Morison Robertson (1821–1867), Hawaiian politician
- George W. Robertson (1838–1906), New York politician
- George Wilson Robertson (1889–1963), politician in Saskatchewan, Canada
- George Robertson, Baron Robertson of Port Ellen (born 1946), UK Defence Secretary, NATO Secretary-General
- William George Robertson, Canadian politician

== Sportspeople ==
- George Robertson (bobsleigh) (born 1958), British Olympic bobsledder
- George Robertson (cricketer) (1842–1895), Australian cricketer
- George Robertson (footballer, born 1883) (1883–?), Scottish footballer, played for Clyde, Blackburn Rovers and Birmingham
- George Robertson (footballer, born 1885) (1885–1937), Scottish footballer, played for Motherwell, Sheffield Wednesday, East Fife and Scotland
- George Robertson (footballer, born 1915) (1915–2006), Scottish footballer, played for Kilmarnock and Scotland
- George Robertson (footballer, born 1930) (1930–2003), Scottish footballer, played for Plymouth Argyle
- George Robertson (ice hockey) (1927–2021), hockey player
- George Robertson (racing driver) (1884–1955), American racing driver
- George Robertson (rugby union) (1859–1920), New Zealand rugby union footballer
- George Robertson (swimmer) (1900–1976), British swimmer
- George André Robertson (1929–2007), British educator and cricketer
- George S. Robertson (1872–1967), British athlete
- George Robertson (rugby league), Australian rugby league footballer

== Others ==
- George Robertson (painter) (c. 1748–1788), English landscape painter
- George Robertson (writer) (c. 1750–1832), Scottish topographical, agricultural and genealogical writer
- George Robertson (bookseller) (1825–1898), Scottish-Australian bookseller
- George Robertson (publisher) (1860–1933), Scottish-Australian publisher; founder of Angus & Robertson
- George Croom Robertson (1842–1892), Scottish philosopher
- George G. Robertson (active since 1972), American information visualization expert
- George R. Robertson (1933–2023), American actor
- George Scott Robertson (1852–1916), British soldier, author, and administrator
