= Gary Howell =

Gary Howell may refer to:

- Gary Howell (West Virginia politician) (born 1966), member of the West Virginia House of Delegates
- Gary Howell (Michigan politician), member of the Michigan House of Representatives
- Gary Howell (rugby league), (born 1959), Australian rugby league player
