= Tony Chalmers =

Australian rugby league footballer

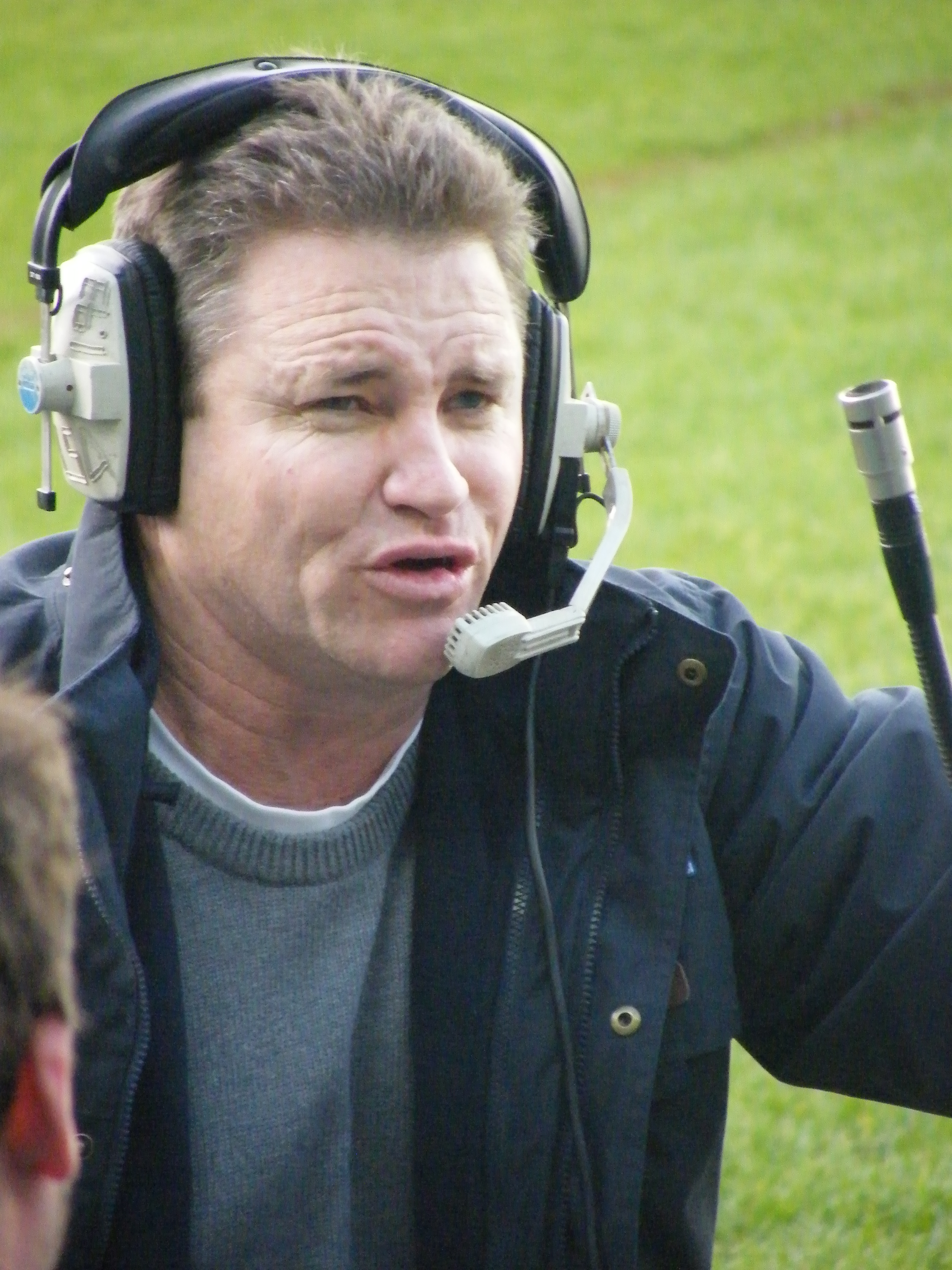
- Tony Chalmers working for Channel Nine in 2008

Personal information
- Full name: Tony Chalmers
- Born: 9 December 1964 (age 61)

Playing information
- Position: Wing
Club
Years	Team	Pld	T	G	FG	P
1985–88	Parramatta Eels	54	15	0	0	60
1989–90	Balmain Tigers	16	3	0	0	12
	Total	70	18	0	0	72

Tony Chalmers (born 9 December 1964) is an Australian former professional rugby league footballer who played in the 1980s and 1990s. Post football he is known as a Floor Manager on popular Rugby League shows such as the NRL Footy Show, Nine’s NRL coverage and now Fox Sport’s NRL coverage.

== Playing career ==
Chalmers made his first grade debut at the age of 20 with the Parramatta Eels in Round 7 of the 1985 NSWRL season, becoming the 439th player to do so. Playing on the wing, he scored a try on debut.

In his second year with the club, he won a premiership when Parramatta defeated Canterbury-Bankstown in the 1986 Grand Final.

In 1987, Chalmers found himself regularly in the run-on squad. He scored 7 tries that season, a career best. In his final year with the Eels, he scored 3 tries.

In 1989, Chalmers began playing with the Balmain Tigers. An injury sustained in the early part of the season saw him sidelined for 5 weeks. Returning in Round 10, he was part of squad that took Balmain to the grand final. Balmain went down to the Canberra Raiders 19–14 in extra time. Chalmers played in the semi-final victory over South Sydney but did not play in the grand final itself.

In his final season in the NSWRL, Chalmers only played three first grade games. His final game was played against the Illawarra Steelers in round 15. He scored a try in Balmain's 32–8 victory.

== Post playing ==
Chalmers is now employed as floor manager for the Nine Network.
