= Fred McKean =

Australian rugby league footballer (born 1913)

Personal information
- Full name: Frederick August Daniel McKean
- Born: 27 January 1913 Warren, New South Wales, Australia
- Died: 13 November 1984 (aged 71)

Playing information
- Position: Prop
Club
| Years | Team | Pld | T | G | FG | P |
|---|---|---|---|---|---|---|
| 1939–44 | Western Suburbs | 50 | 6 | 1 | 0 | 20 |
| 1947–48 | Parramatta | 21 | 3 | 0 | 0 | 9 |
| | Total | 71 | 9 | 1 | 0 | 29 |

Frederick August Daniel McKean (born 27 January 1913, date of death unknown), nicknamed Snowy, was an Australian rugby league footballer who played in the 1930s and 1940s. He played for Western Suburbs and Parramatta as a prop. He was a foundation player for Parramatta and played in their first ever match.

== Playing career ==
McKean began his first grade career with Western Suburbs in 1939 and played six seasons with the club. His time with Western Suburbs was not very successful and the club finished last on 3 occasions. In 1947, McKean joined Parramatta who had just been admitted into the competition along with Manly. Before the season began, McKean was the clubs oldest recruit at 34 years old. McKean played for Parramatta in the club's first game against Newtown which was played at Cumberland Oval and ended in a 34–12 defeat. McKean scored the club's second ever try after George Cook had scored the club's first.

Parramatta went on to claim the wooden spoon in their inaugural year after struggling all season with a limited roster and managed just 3 wins. McKean played one further season for Parramatta and retired at the end of 1948.

== Personal life ==
McKean was the father to Fred, Janice and Roy. In World War II, McKean served as a Lieutenant in the 19 Battalion of the Volunteer Defence Corps in the Australian Army.
