= Kiana Takairangi =

Cook Islands & New Zealand international rugby league footballer

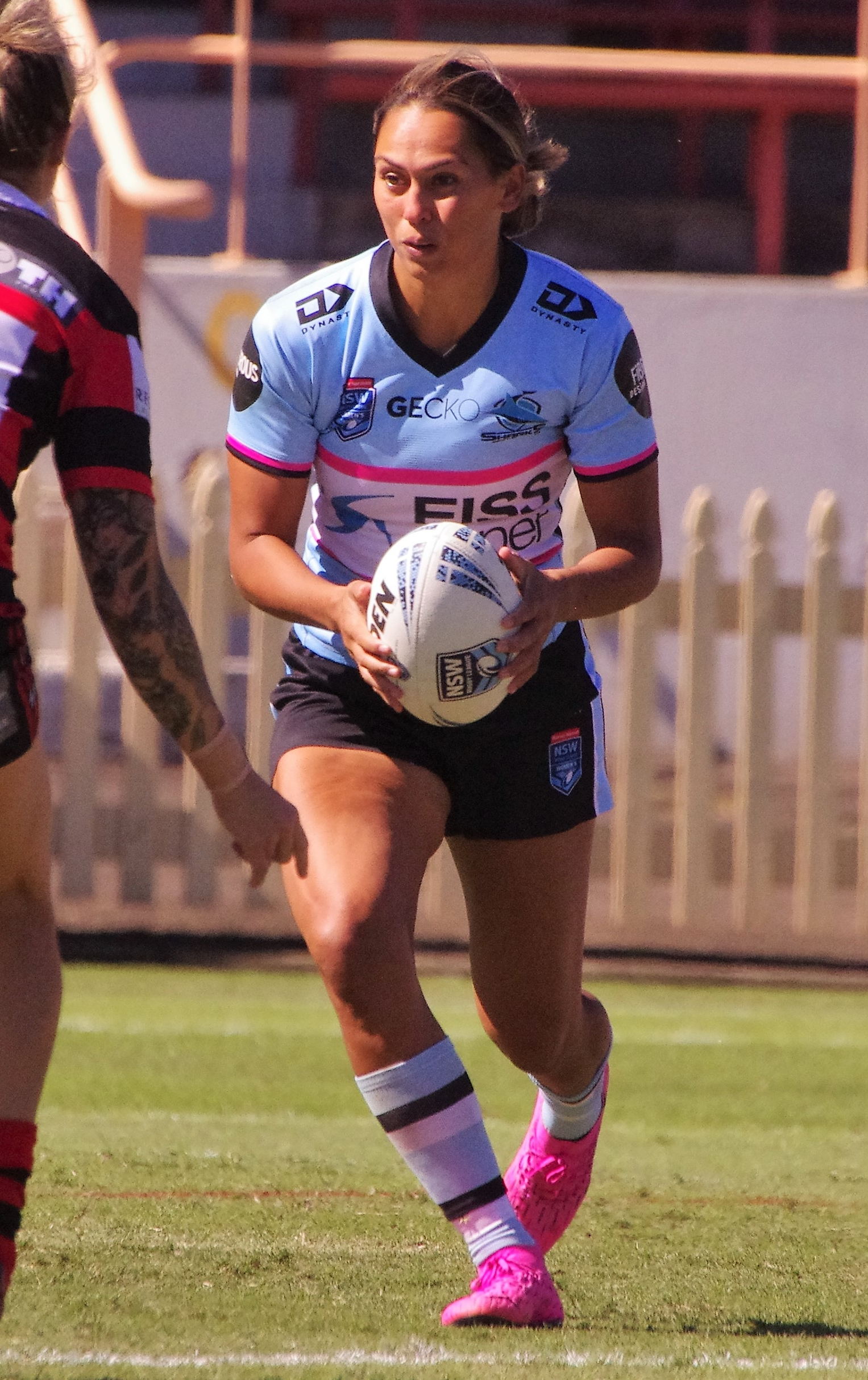
- Takairangi in 2021

Personal information
- Born: 20 July 1992 (age 34) Caringbah, New South Wales, Australia
- Height: 175 cm (5 ft 9 in)
- Weight: 75 kg (11 st 11 lb)

Playing information
- Position: Wing, Centre
Club
Years	Team	Pld	T	G	FG	P
2019	Sydney Roosters	2	0	0	0	0
2022	Newcastle Knights	6	4	0	0	16
2023	Cronulla Sharks	5	2	0	0	8
2025	Parramatta Eels	2	3	0	0	12
	Total	15	9	0	0	36
Representative
Years	Team	Pld	T	G	FG	P
2017–25	Cook Islands	8	1	0	0	4
2019	New Zealand	2	2	0	0	8
2019	New Zealand 9s	3	2	0	0	8
- Source: RLP As of 7 August 2026
- Father: Louis Takaraingi
- Relatives: Brad Takairangi (brother)

Kiana Takairangi (born 20 July 1992) is a New Zealand professional rugby league footballer who last played for the Parramatta Eels in the NRL Women's Premiership.

A winger or centre, she has represented the Cook Islands and New Zealand internationally. She previously played for the Sydney Roosters and Newcastle Knights in the NRLW and the Sharks in the NSWRL Women's Premiership.

== Background ==
Kiana is the sister of Cook Islands and New Zealand international Brad Takairangi. Her father, Louis, played three games for the Parramatta Eels in 1987.

She has also played for the Los Angeles Temptation in the Legends Football League.

== Playing career ==
In 2017, Takairangi represented the Cook Islands at the 2017 Women's Rugby League World Cup.

On 22 June 2019, Takairangi made her debut for New Zealand, starting at centre and scoring two tries in a 46–8 win over Samoa. On 1 July 2019, she was named in the Sydney Roosters NRL Women's Premiership squad.

In Round 1 of the 2019 NRL Women's season, she made her debut for the Roosters in a 12–16 loss to the New Zealand Warriors. In October 2019, she was a member of New Zealand's 2019 Rugby League World Cup 9s-winning squad.

In 2020, Takairangi re-signed with the Roosters as a development player for the 2020 NRL Women's season.

In June 2022, Takairangi signed with the Newcastle Knights for the 2022 season. She made her club debut for the Knights in round 1 of the 2022 NRLW season against the Brisbane Broncos. In the Knights' round 5 win over the St. George Illawarra Dragons, she made her first NRLW appearance at centre and scored her first try, where she beat 5 defenders on her way to the line.

On 2 October 2022, Takairangi played in the Knights' NRLW Grand Final win over the Parramatta Eels, scoring two tries in the Knights' 32-12 victory.

In April 2023, Takairangi signed a 1-year contract with new NRLW side Cronulla-Sutherland Sharks.

In 2025 Takairangi made history, becoming the first brother sister and father to all play for the one club as she played the final two games of the Parramatta Eels NRLW season. She scored three tries in two games

On 18 October 2025 she captained Cook Islands in their 34-6 Pacific Championships win over PNG Orchids

She was released by Parramatta Eels at the end of the 2025 season.
