= Mal Cheney =

Australian rugby league footballer

Personal information
- Full name: Malcolm Cheney
- Born: 26 February 1950 Wagga Wagga, New South Wales, Australia
- Died: 16 April 2013 (aged 63) Wagga Wagga, New South Wales, Australia

Playing information
- Position: Halfback
Club
Years	Team	Pld	T	G	FG	P
1974–75	Parramatta	9	1	0	0	3
- Source: As of 24 April 2019

Malcolm Cheney (1950-2013) was an Australian professional rugby league footballer who played in the 1970s. He played for Parramatta in the New South Wales Rugby League (NSWRL) competition.

== Background ==
Cheney played for Tarcutta, Broken Hill and Ourimbah in the New South Wales Country competitions before signing with Parramatta in 1973.

== Playing career ==
Cheney began his first grade career with Parramatta in 1974. Parramatta finished the 1974 season in second last place just above Balmain on for and against. In 1975, Parramatta replaced Dave Bolton with St George legend Norm Provan as coach. The arrival of Provan changed the fortunes at the club and they finished 5th on the table. Cheney scored his only try for Parramatta in 1975 against North Sydney at North Sydney Oval.

Cheney went on to win the reserve grade premiership with Parramatta in 1975 as they defeated Cronulla-Sutherland in the grand final at the Sydney Cricket Ground.

After leaving Parramatta, Cheney went on to play for Waratah Mayfield and became a captain-coach at Bateman's Bay winning premierships in 1979 and 1986. He died on 16 April 2013 following a long illness.
