= Arthur Slattery =

Australian rugby league footballer

Personal information
- Full name: Arthur Slattery

Playing information
- Position: Prop
Club
Years	Team	Pld	T	G	FG	P
1943–45	South Sydney	21	4	0	0	12
1947–49	Parramatta	34	2	1	0	8
	Total	55	6	1	0	20

Arthur Slattery was an Australian rugby league footballer who played in the 1940s. He played for South Sydney and Parramatta as a prop. Slattery was a foundation player for Parramatta and played in the club's first ever game.

== Playing career ==
Slattery began his career with South Sydney in 1943 and made his debut in Round 5 of the 1943 season against Western Suburbs. Slattery's time at Souths was not very successful and culminated in the club finishing last in 1945. In 1947, Slattery joined the newly admitted Parramatta side. On April 12, 1947, Slattery played in Parramatta's first ever match which was against Newtown at Cumberland Oval and ended in a 34–12 defeat. Parramatta went on to struggle all season managing three wins all year and finished with its first wooden spoon. Slattery went on to play two further seasons with the club before retiring at the end of 1949.
