= George Robertson (footballer, born 1930) =

Scottish footballer (1930–2003)

Personal information
- Date of birth: 20 April 1930
- Place of birth: Falkirk, Scotland
- Date of death: 23 March 2003 (aged 72)
- Place of death: Plymouth, England
- Position: Full back

Senior career*
Years	Team	Apps	(Gls)
1951–1963	Plymouth Argyle	359	(2)
1964–1969	Falmouth Town	166	(16)
- * Club domestic league appearances and goals

George Robertson (20 April 1930 – 23 March 2003) was a Scottish footballer who played as a defender.

Born in Falkirk, Robertson began his career with Junior club Gairdoch Juniors. He signed for Plymouth Argyle after he played in a trial match while based in Salisbury with the RAF. He made his first team debut in 1951 and was a regular in the side for the next decade, initially as a centre back and then as a full back; his favoured position. Towards the end of his career he joined Falmouth Town as player-manager.

Robertson then returned to Plymouth to become a groundsman at Plymouth College, and then as a member of the staff at Home Park. He ran the club's youth hostel, before being appointed as groundsman in the 1980s. In later life, Robertson became a milkman.

Robertson died in Plymouth on 23 March 2003, at the age of 72.
