= Warren Snodgrass (rugby league) =

Australian rugby league footballer

Personal information
- Full name: Warren Snodgrass
- Born: 5 December 1950 (age 74)

Playing information
- Position: Lock, Second-row
Club
Years	Team	Pld	T	G	FG	P
1973	Newtown	1	0	0	0	0
1974	Western Suburbs	21	1	0	0	3
1975–77	Parramatta Eels	10	0	0	0	0
	Total	32	1	0	0	3
- Source: As of 13 December 2023

Warren Snodgrass is an Australian former professional rugby league footballer who played in the 1970s. He played for Western Suburbs, Newtown and Parramatta in the NSWRL competition.

== Playing career ==
Snodgrass made his first grade debut for Newtown in round 4 of the 1973 NSWRFL season against Eastern Suburbs at the Sydney Cricket Ground. It would be his only first grade appearance for the club. In 1974, Snodgrass signed for Western Suburbs and played almost every game as the club reached the preliminary final against Easts in which they lost 25–2. In 1975, Snodgrass joined Parramatta but only made ten first grade appearances over a three-year period.
