= Paul Younane =

Australian rugby league footballer

Personal information
- Born: 8 February 1960 (age 65)

Playing information
- Position: Centre
Club
Years	Team	Pld	T	G	FG	P
1981	Parramatta Eels	3	0	0	0	0
1983	Penrith Panthers	14	8	0	0	32
1984	Parramatta Eels	1	0	0	0	0
1984–85	Warrington	21	8	0	0	32
	Total	39	16	0	0	64

Paul Younane (born 8 February 1960) is an Australian former rugby league footballer for the Parramatta Eels and the Penrith Panthers in the New South Wales Rugby League premiership competition. He also played for Warrington in the Rugby Football League.

== Rugby Player ==
=== Point scoring summary ===
Games	Tries	Goals	F/G	Points
15	8	-	-	32

=== Matches played ===
Team	Matches	Years
Parramatta Eels	3	1981 & 1984
Penrith Panthers	12	1983
