= Louis Takaraingi =

Australian rugby league footballer

Louis Takairangi
Personal information
- Full name: Louis Takairangi

Playing information
- Position: Wing
Club
Years	Team	Pld	T	G	FG	P
1987	Parramatta Eels	3	1	0	0	4
- Source: As of 24 February 2023
- Relatives: Brad Takairangi (son); Kiana Takairangi (daughter)

Louis Takairangi is an Australian former professional rugby league footballer who played in the 1980s. He played for Parramatta in the NSWRL competition.

== Background ==
Takairangi is the father of former Sydney Roosters, Gold Coast, Parramatta, Hull Kingston Rovers, New Zealand and Cook Islands player Brad Takairangi, and Kiana Takairangi, who has played in the NRLW for the Roosters, Knights, Sharks and Eels, and represented Cook Islands and New Zealand at test level.

== Playing career ==
Takairangi made his first grade debut for Parramatta in round 2 of the 1987 NSWRL season against Western Suburbs. He played a further two games for the club and scored his only try against the Illawarra Steelers in round 10 of the competition.
