= Darren Capovilla =

Australian rugby league footballer

Personal information
- Full name: Darren Capovilla
- Born: 21 June 1973 (age 52)

Playing information
- Position: Prop
Club
| Years | Team | Pld | T | G | FG | P |
|---|---|---|---|---|---|---|
| 1993 | Parramatta Eels | 1 | 0 | 0 | 0 | 0 |
| 1996–97 | Western Suburbs | 25 | 0 | 0 | 0 | 0 |
| | Total | 26 | 0 | 0 | 0 | 0 |
Representative
| Years | Team | Pld | T | G | FG | P |
| 2000 | Italy | 3 | 2 | 0 | 0 | 8 |
- Source: As of 16 December 2022

Darren Capovilla is an Australian former professional rugby league footballer who played in the 1990s and 2000s. He played for Parramatta and Western Suburbs in the NSWRL competition.

== Playing career ==
Capovilla made his first grade debut for Parramatta in round 21 of the 1993 NSWRL season against Canberra at Bruce Stadium. Capovilla played off the bench in Parramatta's 68–0 defeat which as of 2022 is still the clubs record defeat. In 1996, Capovilla joined Western Suburbs and enjoyed a successful season where the club qualified for the finals. Capovilla played in Western Suburbs 20-12 elimination finals loss to Cronulla at Parramatta Stadium. This would prove to be the last time Western Suburbs would qualify for the finals. In 1997, Capovilla played eight matches. Capovilla's final game for Western Suburbs was their 39–18 loss to wooden spooners South Queensland. The loss meant Western Suburbs missed the finals with the Gold Coast Chargers leapfrogging them in the process. In 2000, Capovilla represented Italy in three matches of the 2000 emerging nations tournament scoring two tries.
