= Dan Munro (rugby league) =

Australian rugby league footballer

Personal information
- Full name: Daniel Fergus Munro
- Born: 24 June 1922 Barellan, New South Wales, Australia
- Died: 3 April 2011 (aged 88) Manly, New South Wales, Australia

Playing information
- Position: Wing
Club
Years	Team	Pld	T	G	FG	P
1945–46	St George	10	0	7	0	14
1947	Parramatta	13	6	0	0	18
	Total	23	6	7	0	32

Daniel Fergus Munro (1922–2011), also known as Dave Munro, was an Australian rugby league footballer who played in the 1940s. He played for St George and Parramatta as a winger. Munro was a foundation player for Parramatta and played in the club's first ever game.

== Playing career ==
Dan 'Darby' Munro began his career with the St. George Dragons in 1945 after discharge from the Army and coming to the city from Barellan near Temora, New South Wales. In the same year, the club narrowly avoided the wooden spoon coming second last. The following year, St George finished as minor premiers but were defeated in the grand final against Balmain. Munro did not feature in any of the finals matches for St George in 1946.

In 1947, Munro joined newly admitted Parramatta and played on the wing in the club's first ever game against Newtown on April 12 which ended in a 34–12 defeat. Parramatta went on the struggle for the entire season and finished last on the table claiming its first wooden spoon. Munro played 13 games in the club's inaugural year scoring 6 tries before retiring at the end of the season.
