= Wade L'Estrange =

Australian rugby league footballer and administrator

Personal information
- Full name: Wade L'Estrange
- Born: 12 January 1980 (age 46)

Playing information
- Position: Hooker
Club
| Years | Team | Pld | T | G | FG | P |
|---|---|---|---|---|---|---|
| 2000 | Parramatta Eels | 6 | 0 | 0 | 0 | 0 |
- Source: As of 03 September 2019

Wade L'Estrange (born 12 January 1980) is an Australian former professional rugby league footballer who played in the 2000s. He played for Parramatta in the NRL competition.

== Playing career ==
L'Estrange made his first grade debut for Parramatta against the Sydney Roosters in round 1 of the 2000 NRL season at Stadium Australia. L'Estrange played six games for Parramatta in his only season for the club. During the 2000 season, Parramatta were dubbed by the media as the "Baby Eels" as the average age of the squad was not exceeding 23 years old. They would eventually reach the preliminary final but fell short of a grand final appearance losing to the Brisbane Broncos.

After being released by Parramatta, L'Estrange played for CYMS Dubbo, The Entrance Tigers in the Ron Massey Cup and the Asquith Magpies.
