= Bill Greentree =

Australian rugby league footballer

Personal information
- Born: 12 December 1969 (age 56)

Playing information
- Position: Hooker
Club
Years	Team	Pld	T	G	FG	P
1989–90	Bramley RLFC
1990–93	Parramatta Eels	27	3	0	0	12
1997	York Wasps	5	0	0	0	0
	Total	32	3	0	0	12

Bill Greentree (born 12 December 1969) is an Australian former professional rugby league footballer who played for the Parramatta Eels.

Greentree, a hooker, came to Parramatta via Dubbo and was a NSW Schoolboys representative player. He debuted in first-grade in round 10 of the 1990 NSWRL season, initially playing off the bench. When he made his first appearance as starting hooker five rounds later, he scored two tries, as the Eels defeated the Gold Coast by 40 points. He remained with Parramatta until 1993, amassing 27 NSWRL games.
