= Mark Clinton (rugby league) =

Australian rugby league footballer

Personal information
- Full name: Mark Clinton
- Born: 27 May 1963 (age 61)

Playing information
- Position: Prop
Club
Years	Team	Pld	T	G	FG	P
1988–91	Parramatta Eels	41	1	0	0	4
- Source: As of 17 February 2023

Mark Clinton nicknamed "Pa" is an Australian former professional rugby league footballer who played in the 1980s and 1990s. He played for Parramatta in the NSWRL competition.

== Playing career ==
Clinton made his first grade debut as a 25-year old in round 4 of the 1988 NSWRL season against Penrith at Penrith Stadium. In his first two seasons at Parramatta, Clinton was a regular starter in the front row. After missing the entire 1990 season, Clinton played a further six games for Parramatta in 1991. His final game in the top grade was in round 11 of the 1991 NSWRL season against South Sydney.
