= Wally Woodward =

Australian rugby league footballer

Personal information
- Full name: Wally Woodward
- Born: 13 March 1922 Sydney, New South Wales, Australia
- Died: 17 March 2003 (aged 81) Taree, New South Wales, Australia

Playing information
- Position: Halfback
Club
Years	Team	Pld	T	G	FG	P
1947	Parramatta	18	5	0	0	15

Wally Woodward (13 March 1922 – 17 March 2003) was an Australian rugby league footballer who played in the 1940s. He played for Parramatta as a halfback. He was a foundation player of the club.

== Playing career ==
Woodward began his rugby league career in 1947 with newly admitted side Parramatta. Woodward was one of the local players selected to make up the new team and had no previous first grade experience. Woodward played in Parramatta's first ever match against Newtown on 12 April 1947 which ended in a 34–12 defeat at Cumberland Oval. Parramatta went on to struggle for the remaining of their inaugural year winning just three games and claimed its first wooden spoon as a club.
