= Brett Scott (rugby league) =

Australian rugby league footballer

Personal information
- Full name: Brett Douglas Scott
- Born: 18 April 1960 (age 64); Paddington, New South Wales, Australia

Playing information
- Position: Five-eighth
Club
Years	Team	Pld	T	G	FG	P
1981–88	Parramatta Eels	26	7	0	1	29
- Source: As of 13 December 2023

Brett Scott is an Australian former professional rugby league footballer who played in the 1980s. He played for Parramatta in the NSWRL competition.

== Playing career ==
Scott made his first grade debut for Parramatta against Newtown in round 1 of the 1981 NSWRFL season at Cumberland Oval. He played a total of five games that season as Parramatta claimed their first ever premiership. Scott would then not feature in first grade for the next six years. In round 6 of the 1987 NSWRL season, Scott played off the bench in Parramatta's victory over South Sydney. Scott would feature more regularly in first grade over the next two seasons. He made his last appearance for the club in first grade during Parramatta's round 20 victory over Brisbane in the 1988 NSWRL season.
