= Phil Mann =

Australian rugby league footballer

Personal information
- Full name: Phil John Mann
- Born: 16 October 1953 (age 72) Sydney, New South Wales, Australia

Playing information
- Height: 201 cm (6 ft 7 in)
- Weight: 94 kg (14 st 11 lb)
- Position: Fullback
Club
Years	Team	Pld	T	G	FG	P
1974–81	Parramatta Eels	55	20	0	0	60
- Father: Bruce Mann

Phil John Mann (born 16 October 1953) is an Australian former professional rugby league footballer who played in the 1970s and 1980s. He played for the Parramatta Eels, as a fullback. At 201 centimetres (6 feet 7 inches) tall, Mann was one of the tallest players to ever play the game. He is the son of former Parramatta Eels player Bruce Mann.

== Playing career ==
A junior from Hills District, Mann was graded with the Parramatta Eels for the 1973 season, and made his first grade debut for the Eels in the 1974 season. At his most effective when in top stride, Mann was one of the Eels' best players during the series of sudden death play-offs to decide the final five semi-finalists in 1975. At the end of the 1975 season, Mann played in Parramatta's first ever reserve grade premiership team. Despite being the Eels' regular fullback in 1976, Mann was dropped from the Eels' side when they made their maiden first grade Grand Final appearance in the 1976 season against the Manly Sea Eagles at the Sydney Cricket Ground. The Sea Eagles went on to win the match 13–10.

Despite being dropped from the Eels' 1976 Grand Final team, and despite missing most of the Eels' superb 1977 season in which they won the minor premiership for the first time in the club's history, Mann was called into first grade again when John Peard withdrew due to injury, to play in the historic 1977 Grand Final against the St. George Dragons at the Sydney Cricket Ground. The Grand Final was significant, because it was the first of two to date (the other being the 1978 Grand Final between the Manly Sea Eagles and the Cronulla Sharks in which they drew 11-all) to be forced into a replay when the scores finished 9-all at full time. Mann was consequently dropped from the side when John Peard returned from injury to play in the Grand Final replay. The Dragons went on to win the replay 22–0.

From 1978 onwards, poor form and injuries had begun to take their toll on Mann, and with the emergence of new players such as; Mick Cronin, Steve Ella, Eric Grothe Sr., Neil Hunt, Brett Kenny, John Muggleton, Graham Murray, Steve Sharp, Peter Sterling and Peter Wynn, Mann found it very difficult to hold down a spot in first grade, although he did manage to participate in a second reserve grade premiership and the end of 1979. He played his last first grade game for the Eels from the bench in their 26–7 victory over the Balmain Tigers at Cumberland Oval in round 9 of the Eels' historic 1981 season in which they would go on to win the premiership for the first time. Mann left the Eels and the end of the 1983 season.

== Post-playing ==
After retiring from the game, Mann went on to live in Port Macquarie, and later coached the Port Macquarie Sharks to three straight premierships in the Group 3 competition in the early 1990s. He later went on to be club president of the Port Macquarie Sharks.
