= Simon Scanlan =

Australian rugby league footballer

Personal information
- Full name: Simon Scanlan

Playing information
- Position: Centre
Club
Years	Team	Pld	T	G	FG	P
1996	Parramatta Eels	1	1	0	0	4
- Source: As of 17 December 2024

Simon Scanlan is an Australian former professional rugby league footballer who played in the 1990s. He played for Parramatta in the ARL competition.

== Playing career ==
Scanlan played his junior rugby league with the Collegians club. In 1996, Scanlan joined Parramatta. He made his first grade debut for Parramatta in round 22 of the 1996 ARL season against Penrith at Penrith Stadium. Scanlan scored a try in Parramatta's 24–16 loss. This was Scanlan's only first grade appearance. In 1999, he played for the Warwick Cowboys in Queensland. After retiring, he worked in recruitment and development with NRL club Brisbane.
