= Andrew Fitzhenry =

Australian rugby league footballer

Personal information
- Born: 14 March 1968 (age 57)

Playing information
- Position: Fullback, Halfback
Club
Years	Team	Pld	T	G	FG	P
1987	Penrith Panthers	4	0	6	0	12
1988–92	Parramatta Eels	35	3	59	0	130
	Total	39	3	65	0	142

Andrew Fitzhenry (born 14 March 1968) is an Australian former professional rugby league footballer who played for the Penrith Panthers and Parramatta Eels in the New South Wales Rugby League (NSWRL).

As a youth, Fitzhenry represented NSW Under 19s in both cricket and rugby league.

Fitzhenry started his NSWRL career at Penrith, where he played as a halfback and featured in four premiership games in 1987. From 1988 to 1992 he played for Parramatta, during which time he amassed a further 35 appearances in first-grade, as a goal-kicking fullback.

In addition to rugby league, Fitzhenry also played first-grade cricket, as a wicket-keeper batsman for Balmain.
