= Andrew Langford =

Australian rugby league footballer (born 1967)

Personal information
- Full name: Andrew Langford
- Born: 31 August 1967 (age 58)

Playing information
- Height: 189 cm (6 ft 2 in)
- Weight: 95 kg (209 lb; 14 st 13 lb)
- Position: Second-row
Club
Years	Team	Pld	T	G	FG	P
1989–93	Parramatta Eels	40	1	0	0	4

Andrew Langford (born 31 August 1967) is an Australian former professional rugby league footballer who played during the 1980s and 1990s. He played his entire club football career with the Parramatta Eels. His position of choice was second-row.

== Playing career ==
Langford was graded by the Parramatta Eels in the 1988 season, he made his first grade debut at second-row in his side's 22−20 victory over arch rivals the Manly Sea Eagles at Parramatta Stadium in round 1 of the 1989 season. Langford made 12 appearances for the Eels in his debut season, with seven of those being in the starting side.

In the 1990 season, Langford played all of his 13 games for the season in the starting side. Langford's only try in his first grade career came in his side's 20−14 loss to the Penrith Panthers in round 12 of the 1991 season.

After not making a single first grade appearance in the 1992 season, Langford's final season in first grade came in the 1993 season, in which he made only two appearances. His final appearance in first grade came from the bench in his side's 36−4 loss to the St. George Dragons at Jubilee Oval in round 19 of the 1993 season. He was released by the Eels at season's end and subsequently retired from playing. He finished his career playing 40 games, and scoring one try.
