= John Frare =

Australian rugby league footballer

Personal information
- Full name: John Frare

Playing information
- Position: Halfback, Wing
Club
Years	Team	Pld	T	G	FG	P
1994–95	Parramatta Eels	17	4	3	0	22
Representative
Years	Team	Pld	T	G	FG	P
1999–00	Italy	4	3	7	0	26
- Source: As of 15 February 2023

John Frare is a former Italy international rugby league footballer who played in the 1990s and 2000s. He played for Parramatta in the NSWRL and ARL competitions.

== Playing career ==
Frare made his first grade debut in round 7 of the 1994 NSWRL season against Penrith at Parramatta Stadium. Frare scored a try on debut as Parramatta lost the match 34-10. Frare would play 17 games for Parramatta over two seasons alternating between halfback and winger.

== International career ==
Frare represented Italy in one game of the 1999 Mediterranean Cup against France. In 2000, Frare played three games for Italy at the 2000 Emerging Nations World Cup.
