= George Saywell =

Australian rugby league footballer

Personal information
- Full name: George Saywell

Playing information
- Position: Second-row
Club
Years	Team	Pld	T	G	FG	P
1947	Parramatta	11	0	0	0	0

George Saywell was an Australian rugby league footballer who played in the 1940s. He was a foundation player for Parramatta and played in the club's first ever game.

== Playing career ==
Saywell began his first grade career in 1947. The same year that Parramatta and Manly were admitted into the NSWRL competition. Saywell was one of the new players in the side with no prior first grade experience. Saywell then went on to play in Parramatta's first ever game against Newtown at Cumberland Oval which ended in a 34–12 defeat. Saywell played 11 times for the club in its inaugural season as the team struggled throughout the year winning only 3 games and finished last on the table.
