= Bruce Mann (rugby league) =

Australian rugby league footballer

Personal information
- Full name: Bruce Mann
- Born: 14 January 1926 Parramatta, New South Wales, Australia
- Died: 22 January 2007 (aged 81) Baulkham Hills, New South Wales, Australia

Playing information
- Position: Second-row
Club
Years	Team	Pld	T	G	FG	P
1948–58	Parramatta	157	36	2	0	112
- Relatives: Phil Mann (son)

Bruce Mann (1926–2007) was an Australian professional rugby league footballer who played in the 1940s and 1950s. He played his entire career for Parramatta in the NSWRL competition.

== Early life ==
Mann was born and raised in the Parramatta district and began playing rugby union at a young age culminating in playing with the Parramatta rugby union team before switching to rugby league.

== Playing career ==
Mann made his debut for Parramatta in 1948, a year after the club was admitted into the competition. Mann spent 10 long seasons at Parramatta in which the club struggled on the field due to a lack of resources and playing talent with the bulk of the squad made up of amateur players and park footballers who had to compete against clubs like South Sydney, Newtown and St George who fielded representative players. Mann claimed 5 wooden spoons as a player with Parramatta during that time but stayed loyal to the club and was the first Parramatta player to reach 100 first grade matches and then 150 first grade matches. With 157 appearances to his name, Mann would remain the Eels most capped player until he was surpassed by Roy Fisher in the 1962 season.

== Post playing ==
In retirement, Mann was made a life member of the club and he had a son Phil Mann who went on to play 51 first grade matches for the club between 1974 and 1981. He died on 22 January 2007 aged 81.
