= Peter Wright (rugby league) =

Australian rugby league footballer

Personal information
- Full name: Peter Wright
- Born: Penrith, New South Wales, Australia

Playing information
- Position: Prop
Club
Years	Team	Pld	T	G	FG	P
1968	Parramatta	2	0	0	0	0
1970–71	Penrith	16	0	0	0	0
	Total	18	0	0	0	0
- As of 12 Jul 2021

Peter Wright (born in Penrith, New South Wales) is an Australian former professional rugby league footballer who played in the 1960s and 1970s. He played for the Parramatta Eels and Penrith Panthers in the New South Wales Rugby League premiership competition. He played at prop.

== Sources ==
- Whiticker, Alan & Hudson, Glen (2006) The Encyclopedia of Rugby League Players, Gavin Allen Publishing, Sydney
