= Jamie Owens =

Australian rugby league footballer

Personal information
- Full name: Jamie Owens
- Born: 2 May 1976 (age 49)

Playing information
- Position: Hooker
Club
Years	Team	Pld	T	G	FG	P
1998	Parramatta Eels	11	0	0	1	1
- Source: As of 30 August 2019

Jamie Owens is an Australian former professional rugby league footballer who played in the 1990s. He played for Parramatta in the NRL competition.

== Playing career ==
Owens made his first grade debut for Parramatta in round 1 of the 1998 NRL season against Penrith which Parramatta won 27–16 at Parramatta Stadium.

Owens played 11 first grade games for Parramatta in 1998. Owens finest moment came in round 19 against arch rivals Canterbury-Bankstown when he kicked a field goal giving Parramatta a 7–6 victory at Belmore Oval.

Owens final game in the top grade came in round 22 1998 against Penrith. Parramatta would go on to enjoy their best season since 1986 finishing fourth on the table and reached the preliminary final against Canterbury where they lost 32–20 in extra-time after leading 18–2 with less than 11 minutes remaining of normal time.
