= Mark Ko'cass =

Australian rugby league footballer

Personal information
- Full name: Mark Ko'cass

Playing information
- Position: Halfback
Club
Years	Team	Pld	T	G	FG	P
1986	Parramatta Eels	3	0	0	0	0
1987	St. George Dragons	16	2	0	1	9
	Total	19	2	0	1	9
- Source: As of 10 February 2023

Mark Ko'cass is an Australian former professional rugby league footballer who played in the 1980s. He played for Parramatta and St. George in the New South Wales Rugby League (NSWRL) competition.

== Playing career ==
Ko'cass made his first-grade debut in round 12 of the 1986 NSWRL season against Canberra at Parramatta Stadium. Ko'cass played three games for Parramatta as they won their fourth premiership that year. In 1987, Ko'cass joined St. George and played 16 games as the starting halfback. His final game in the top grade was a 34–16 loss against his old side Parramatta in round 25 of the 1987 NSWRL season.
