= Brad Takairangi =

Cook Islands & New Zealand international rugby league player (born 1989)

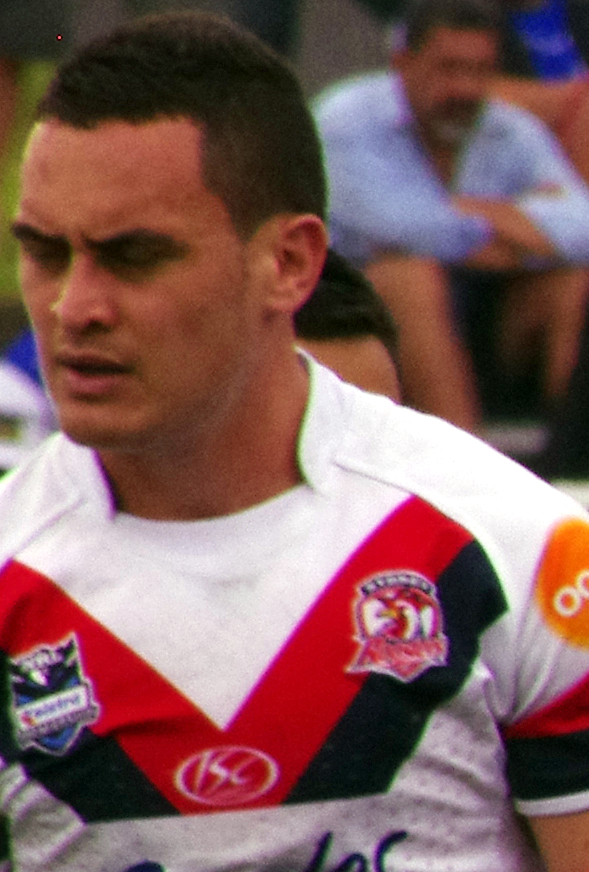

Personal information
- Full name: Bradley Louis Takairangi
- Born: 14 June 1989 (age 37) Sydney, New South Wales, Australia
- Height: 6 ft 4 in (1.94 m)
- Weight: 17 st 5 lb (110 kg)

Playing information
- Position: Second-row, Loose forward, Centre, Stand-off
Club
Years	Team	Pld	T	G	FG	P
2010–12	Sydney Roosters	29	3	0	0	12
2013–14	Gold Coast Titans	39	8	0	0	32
2015–20	Parramatta Eels	110	21	0	0	84
2021–22	Hull Kingston Rovers	24	4	0	0	16
	Total	202	36	0	0	144
Representative
Years	Team	Pld	T	G	FG	P
2009–	Cook Islands	18	1	4	0	12
2017	New Zealand	4	1	0	0	4
2019–20	Māori All Stars	2	0	0	0	0
2019	Cook Islands 9s	1	0	2	0	4
- Source: As of 22 November 2026
- Father: Louis Takaraingi
- Relatives: Kiana Takairangi (sister)

Brad Takairangi (born 14 June 1989) is a professional rugby league footballer who plays as a five-eighth or centre. He has played for the Cook Islands, New Zealand and the New Zealand Māori at international level.

Takairangi previously played for the Parramatta Eels, Sydney Roosters and the Gold Coast Titans in the NRL and Hull KR in the Super League.

== Background ==
Takairangi was born in Sydney, Australia, and is of Cook Island Māori descent. He played his junior rugby league for the Cronulla-Caringbah Sharks.

His sister, Kiana Takairangi, represented the Cook Islands national team at the 2017 Women's Rugby League World Cup and played in the Lingerie Football League for the Los Angeles Temptation.

== Playing career ==
Takairangi played his junior football with the Cronulla-Caringbah Sharks before being signed by the South Sydney Rabbitohs.

=== 2009 ===
In 2009, Takairangi made his international debut for the Cook Islands, kicking 3 conversions in a 22–20 victory over Samoa.

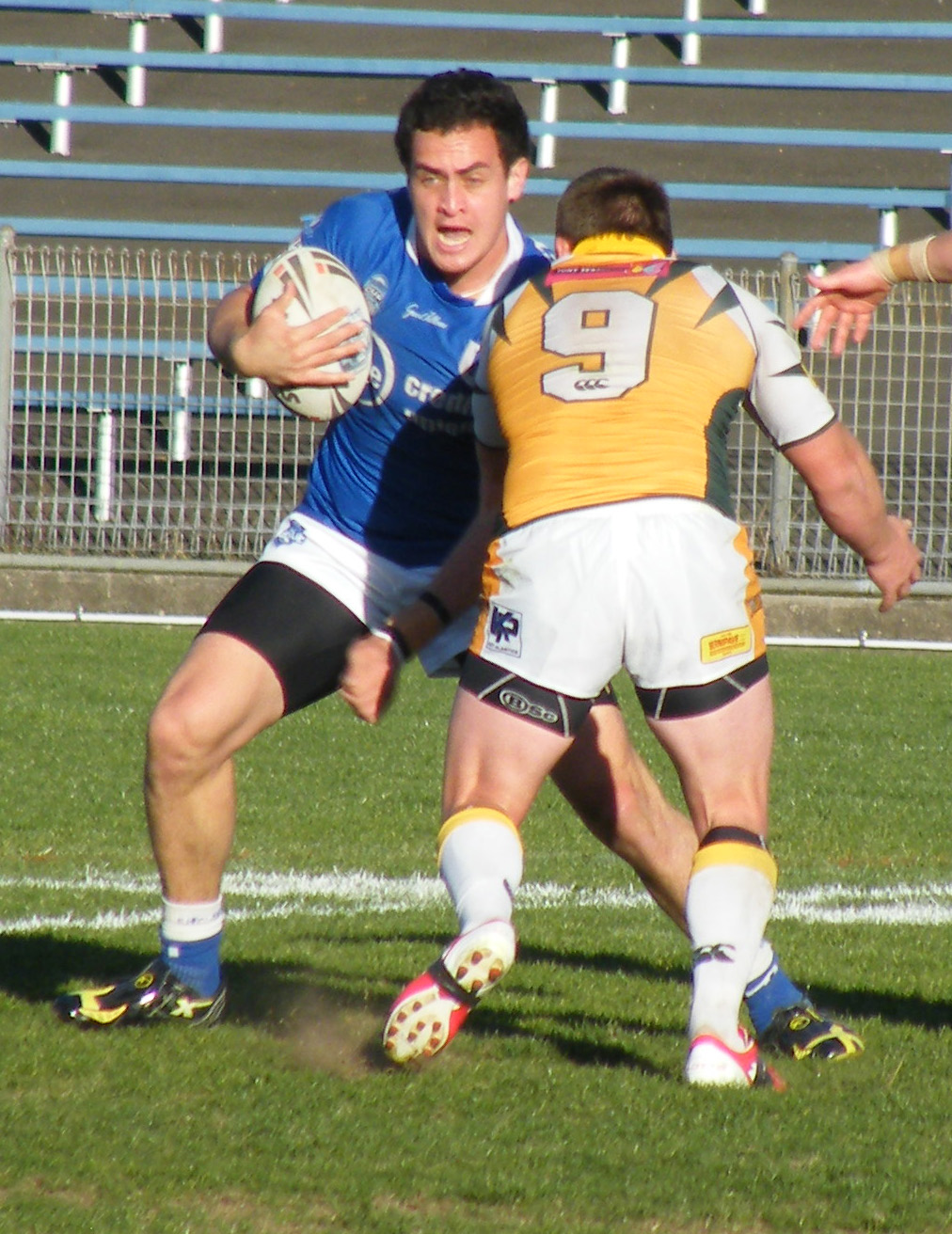
Takairangi playing for the Newtown Jets

=== 2010 ===
Takairangi played in South Sydney's NYC team in 2008 and 2009, before being signed by the Sydney Roosters in February 2010. In round 2, he made his NRL debut for the Sydney Roosters against the Wests Tigers off the interchange bench in the 44–32 win at the SFS. Takairangi played in one other match during the season.

=== 2011 ===
On 25 August, Takairangi signed an extension with the Sydney Roosters which would keep him there until the end of the 2013 NRL season. In round 24, against the Cronulla-Sutherland Sharks, he scored his first NRL career try in the Sydney Roosters 36–25 win at the Sydney Football Stadium. Takairangi finished the year with 2 tries from 11 matches.

=== 2012 ===
Takairangi played in 16 matches and scored a try for the Sydney Roosters in the 2012 NRL season.

=== 2013 ===
On 5 February, Takairangi signed with the Gold Coast on a three-year deal, as part of an attempt by the Sydney Roosters to lure Luke O'Donnell back to the club. In round 1, Takairangi made his club debut for the Gold Coast against the Cronulla-Sutherland Sharks by playing at centre in the Titans 10–12 loss at Remondis Stadium. In round 11, against the Parramatta Eels, he scored his first club try for the Gold Coast in their 42–4 win at Mudgee Oval. Takairangi finished the NRL season with 18 matches and five tries. He then played for the Cook Islands in the 2013 Rugby League World Cup. He played in three matches and scored a try during the tournament.

=== 2014 ===
In February, Takairangi played in the Titans inaugural Auckland Nines squad. He finished the season with 21 appearances and three tries for the Titans. On 9 September, Takairangi was selected for the New Zealand national rugby league team 2014 Four Nations train-on squad, but didn't make the final 24-man squad. On 19 September, Takairangi agreed to sign a three-year deal with the Wests Tigers, starting from the 2015 season. However, Wests back-flipped on Takairangi's deal, leaving him off contract for the 2015 season. On 30 October, he signed with the Parramatta Eels on a one-year deal.

=== 2015 ===
On 26 January, Takairangi was named in Parramatta's Auckland Nines squad. In round 1, he made his club debut for Parramatta against the Manly-Warringah Sea Eagles at centre, scoring a try in the 42–12 win at Parramatta Stadium. On 4 April, Takairangi re-signed with the Eels for a further two years. In round 22, against the Penrith Panthers, he suffered a season ending foot injury. Takairangi finished his first year with Parramatta with him playing in 17 matches and scoring 4 tries but mostly known for his combination and try assists to his wing partner Semi Radradra.

=== 2016 ===
In round 22 against Manly, Takairangi played his 100th NRL career match in Parramatta's 10–9 win at Parramatta Stadium. Takairangi finished the season with him playing in 17 matches and scoring four tries and being 18th man for the NZ Kiwis. On 20 September 2017, Takairangi extended his contract with Parramatta until the end of the 2019 NRL season.

=== 2017 ===
Takairangi played 23 games for Parramatta in the 2017 NRL season where the team finished fourth on the table. He then went on to debut for New Zealand in the 2017 Rugby League World Cup.

=== 2018 ===
In round 2 of the 2018 NRL season, Takairangi was ruled out for five weeks with a fractured eye socket after being accidentally elbowed in the face by Manly player Joel Thompson. Takairangi returned to the Parramatta side in round 7 against Manly, Parramatta went on to win the match 44–10 which was their first of the season. Takairangi ended a difficult 2018 season with 20 appearances for the club as Parramatta finished last on the table and claimed its 14th wooden spoon.

=== 2019 ===
Takairangi began the 2019 NRL season as one of the club's first choice centres. In round 4, Takairangi scored his first try of the season in a 24–12 victory over Cronulla-Sutherland. In round 5, Takairangi played his 150th NRL game against Canberra which ended in a 19–0 defeat.

On 28 May, Takairangi was demoted to reserve grade by coach Brad Arthur after the club had suffered three disappointing losses in a row. The last of which was against bottom placed Penrith.

After spending a month in reserve grade, Takairangi was called back into the Parramatta team for their round 15 clash against Canberra to cover injuries within the side. Takairangi played at centre as Parramatta defeated Canberra 22–16 at TIO Stadium in Darwin. In Round 17 against Wests Tigers, Takairangi scored the first ever hat-trick at the newly built Bankwest Stadium as Parramatta won the match 30–18 at the new Western Sydney Stadium.

Takairangi played a total of 23 games for Parramatta in the 2019 NRL season as the club finished 5th on the table and qualified for the finals. Takairangi played in both finals matches for the club as they reached the elimination final against Melbourne but were defeated 32–0 at AAMI Park which ended their season.

On 10 October, Takairangi was named in the Cook Islands squad for the 2019 Rugby League World Cup 9s. On 4 November, Takairangi signed a one-year contract extension with Parramatta.

=== 2020 ===
Takairangi scored his first try of the 2020 NRL season in round 20 against the Wests Tigers which Parramatta won 28–24. The victory saw Parramatta finish third and qualify for the finals inside the competitions top four.

Takairangi played 10 games for Parramatta in the 2020 NRL season including the club's elimination final loss to South Sydney. On 12 October, Takairangi was one of the 11 players released by Parramatta.

On 16 December, it was announced that Takairangi had signed a two-year contract with Hull Kingston Rovers.

=== 2021 ===
Takairangi made a total of 17 appearances for Hull KR in the 2021 Super League season including the club's 28-10 semi-final loss against the Catalans Dragons.

=== 2022 ===
On 4 January, Takairangi was stood down by Hull KR after reportedly being arrested for drink-driving. Hull KR released a club statement which read “Hull KR have been made aware by the player and his legal representative of allegations brought against him by Humberside Police, the matter is under review by the club and will be dealt with internally. There will be no further comment at this stage from the club or player". On 3 March, Takairangi pleaded guilty to offences of drink driving and dangerous driving. Appearing at Kingston upon Hull Crown Court on 6 April, Takairangi was sentenced to 12 months imprisonment suspended for two years and ordered to carry out 300 hours unpaid work. On 29 August, it was announced that Takairangi would be one of eleven players who were to depart Hull Kingston Rovers at the end of the 2022 season. Takairangi represented the Cook Islands at the 2021 Rugby League World Cup. He played in all three group stage matches including the Cook Islands worst ever loss as a rugby league nation when they were beaten 92-10 by Tonga.

=== 2023 ===
On 16 January, it was revealed that Takairangi had signed a contract to join the Dapto Canaries in the Illawarra Rugby League competition.

=== 2026 ===
In 2026, it was reported that Takairangi had signed for Glebe in the Ron Massey Cup. In October, Takairangi was named in the Cook Islands team ahead of the 2026 Rugby League World Cup.

== Statistics ==
Year	Team	Games	Tries	Pts
2010	Sydney Roosters	2		
2011	Sydney Roosters	11	2	8
2012	Sydney Roosters	16	1	4
2013	Gold Coast Titans	18	5	20
2014	Gold Coast Titans	21	3	12
2015	Parramatta Eels	17	4	16
2016	Parramatta Eels	17	4	16
2017	Parramatta Eels	23	3	12
2018	Parramatta Eels	20	1	4
2019	Parramatta Eels	23	8	32
2020	Parramatta Eels	10	1	4
2021	Hull Kingston Rovers	19	2	8
2022	Hull Kingston Rovers	5	2	8
	Totals	202	36	144
