= Pat Hundy =

Australian rugby league footballer

Personal information
- Full name: Patrick Thomas Hundy
- Born: 20 April 1954 (age 71) Paddington, New South Wales, Australia

Playing information
- Position: Prop
Club
Years	Team	Pld	T	G	FG	P
1974–78	Western Suburbs	37	0	0	0	0
1978	Parramatta Eels	12	0	0	0	0
1979	Western Suburbs	2	0	0	0	0
	Total	51	0	0	0	0
- Source: As of 13 December 2023

Pat Hundy is an Australian former professional rugby league footballer who played in the 1970s. He played for Western Suburbs and Parramatta in the NSWRL competition.

== Playing career ==
Hundy made his first grade debut for Western Suburbs in round 5 of the 1974 NSWRFL season against St. George at Kogarah Oval. Hundy played 18 games in his debut year including the clubs preliminary final loss against Eastern Suburbs. In 1977, Hundy played in Western Suburbs 1977 Amco Cup final victory against Eastern Suburbs. In 1978, Hundy signed for Parramatta and played twelve games for the club. In 1979, he re-joined Western Suburbs but only made two further appearances.
