= Mark Barnes (rugby league) =

Australian rugby league footballer

Personal information
- Full name: Mark Barnes
- Born: 20 September 1968 (age 57) Westmead, New South Wales, Australia

Playing information
Club
Years	Team	Pld	T	G	FG	P
1987–91	Parramatta Eels	44	2	0	0	8
1993–94	Eastern Suburbs	12	3	0	0	12
	Total	56	5	0	0	20

Mark Barnes (born 20 September 1968) is a Rugby league coach and former professional rugby league footballer from Australia.

== Playing career ==
Barnes played professional Rugby league in Sydney for both the Parramatta Eels and the Eastern Suburbs Roosters over a seven-year period from 1987–94.

== Post playing ==
He then left to study at the Australian College of Physical Education at Homebush Bay, Sydney, graduating as a PE teacher. He spent the next five years teaching and travelling, as well as both coaching and playing rugby league. He went on to join the London Broncos as a community sports coach with the specific role of looking to increase the numbers of children playing rugby league in schools in the area immediate to Griffin Park.

Barnes became a member of the coaching staff at Harlequins RL in December 2004, before linking up with Justin Morgan (his old Parramatta teammate) at Hull Kingston Rovers for the 2007 SL season in the role of Assistant Coach.
