= George Robertson (rugby league) =

Australian rugby league footballer

Personal information
- Full name: George Robertson

Playing information
- Position: Lock
Club
Years	Team	Pld	T	G	FG	P
1947–51	Parramatta	67	4	0	0	12

George Robertson was an Australian rugby league footballer who played in the 1940s and 1950s. He was a foundation player for Parramatta and played in the club's first game. His position was at lock.

== Playing career ==
Robertson began his first grade career for the newly admitted Parramatta side when the club played its first game against Newtown on April 12, 1947, at Cumberland Oval. The game ended in a 34–12 defeat and Parramatta went on to lose the following 7 matches until claiming their first victory against Western Suburbs. Parramatta went on to win only 2 further matches that year as the club finished last on the table and claimed its first wooden spoon. Robertson went on to play a further 4 seasons with the club as they struggled towards the bottom of the ladder due to a lack of resources and playing talent. Robertson retired at the end of 1951 after playing 67 games for Parramatta.
