= George Cook (Australian rugby league player) =

Australian rugby league footballer

Personal information
- Full name: George Cook

Playing information
- Position: Hooker
Club
Years	Team	Pld	T	G	FG	P
1944–46	Canterbury-Bankstown	3	0	0	0	0
1947	Parramatta	17	3	0	0	9
	Total	20	3	0	0	9

George Cook was an Australian rugby league footballer who played in the 1940s. He played for Canterbury-Bankstown and Parramatta as a hooker. Cook was a foundation player for Parramatta and played in the club's first ever game.

== Playing career ==
Cook made his debut for Canterbury in 1944 against Newtown. Over the next two seasons, Cook spent the majority of his playing time in the lower grades for Canterbury. In 1947, Cook joined Parramatta who had just been admitted into the competition. Cook played at hooker in Parramatta's first ever game against Newtown at Cumberland Oval on April 12, 1947. The match ended in a 34–12 defeat but Cook is remembered for scoring the club's first ever try in the game. Cook made 17 appearances for Parramatta that year as the side struggled on the field ending in a wooden spoon at the end of the season.
