= Gary Howell (rugby league) =

Australian Rugby league footballer

Personal information
- Full name: Gary Howell
- Born: 3 December 1959 (age 66) Bourke, New South Wales, Australia

Playing information
- Position: Second-row
Club
Years	Team	Pld	T	G	FG	P
1981–82	Parramatta Eels	7	1	0	0	3
1984–87	Penrith Panthers	34	16	0	0	64
1986–87	Leigh Centurions		1	0	0	4
	Total	41	18	0	0	71

Gary Howell (born 3 December 1959) is an Australian former rugby league footballer who played in the 1980s. He played for the Parramatta Eels, Penrith Panthers, and Leigh Centurions. His position of choice was second-row.

== Playing career ==
Howell was a South Sydney junior. He was graded by the Parramatta Eels in 1980. He made his first grade debut from the bench in his side's 22−5 victory over the Penrith Panthers at Cumberland Oval in round 18 of the 1981 season. Howell only managed to make 6 further appearances for the Eels over the next two seasons and did not play in the club's maiden premiership victory against the Newtown Jets, nor did he play in the Eels' premiership victories over the Manly Warringah Sea Eagles in 1982, and 1983. Howell's stint with the Eels ended at the conclusion of the 1983 season.

In 1984, Howell moved to the Penrith Panthers. Howell made his club debut in round 13 against the defending premiers and his former team the Parramatta Eels in an upset 22−10 win at Belmore Sports Ground coming off the bench. He would make 9 appearances in 1984, including 6 as a starting second row. Howell made 14 appearances in 1985, including the play off for fifth spot against the Manly Sea Eagles, and their first semi final appearance versus the Parramatta Eels. He would make nine appearances for the Panthers in the 1986 season.

In the 1986/87 off-season, Howell traveled to England to play for English side Leigh Centurions. After his brief stint in England, Howell returned to the Panthers for the start of the 1987 season. He made only two appearances for the Panthers before a knee injury he suffered against the North Sydney Bears at Penrith Park in round 9 of the 1987 season ultimately led to his retirement at season's end. In total, Howell played 41 games and scored 18 tries.
