= List of Australia national rugby league team players =

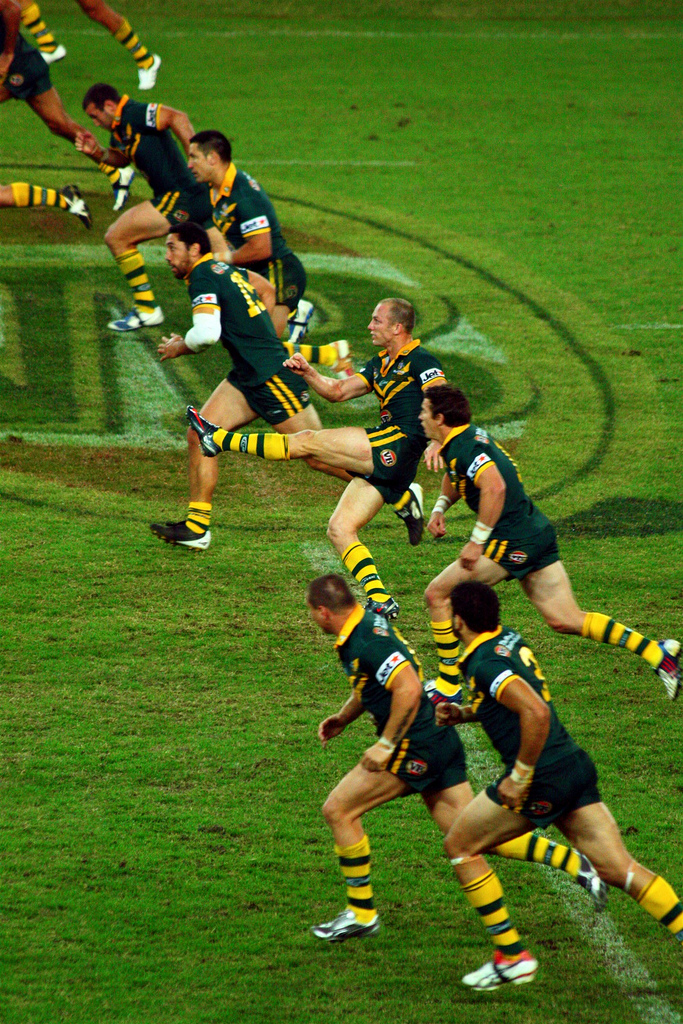
Australian captain Darren Lockyer, kicks off a Kangaroos match in 2009.

There have been over 860 rugby league footballers who have been selected to represent Australia since the nation first started playing international matches in 1908. The Australian Rugby League administered the team and maintained the Australian national rugby league team or "The Kangaroos" players register, assigning each player an individual cap number until 2012 when this was taken over by the Australian Rugby League Commission.

The first Kangaroo was Arthur Hennessey, as he was the original captain of the side. The rest were added in alphabetical order, then in order of selection. Inclusion in the Kangaroos register denotes a player's selection for a Kangaroos squad and does not necessarily mean an actual full international appearance was made. The year selected represents the first year in which they were called up for international duties and the appearances represent full international matches. New Zealand players who were selected to play for 'Australasian' representative teams are also included.

Super League test appearances, although counted as such by their overseas counterparts, have been disregarded by the sport's Australian governing body so are excluded from their register.

== Kangaroos register ==
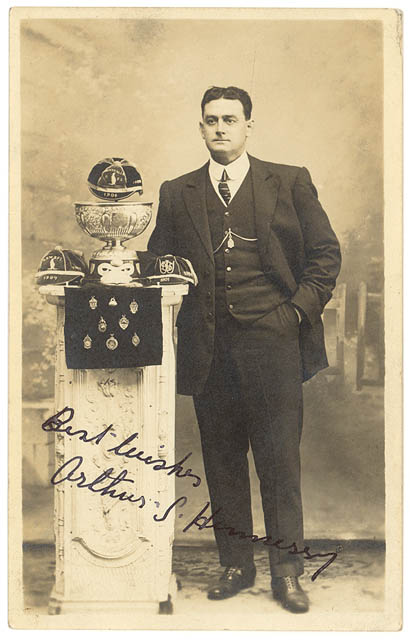
#1 Arthur Hennessy, Australia's first test captain

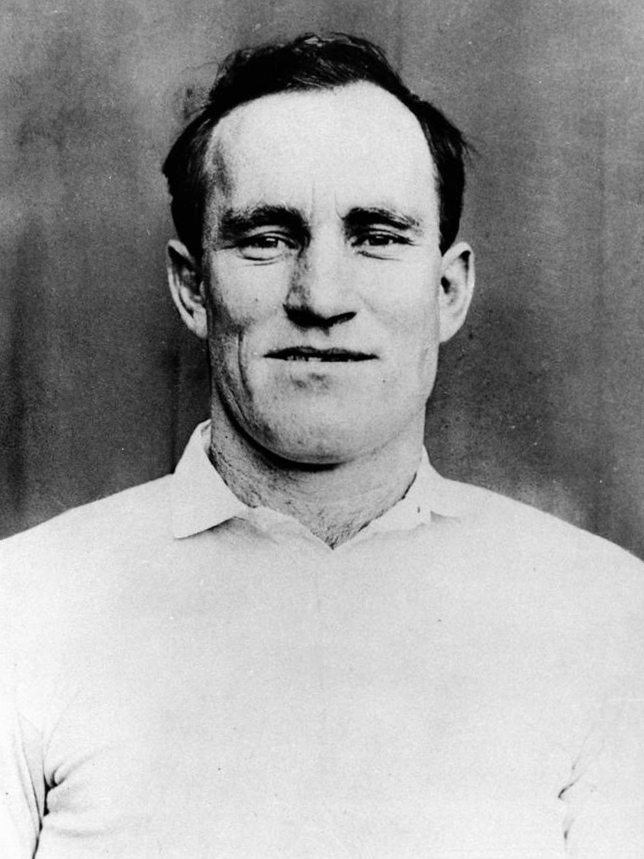
#10 Dally Messenger, league's 1st drawcard star

#17 Sandy Pearce, rowing & footballing family

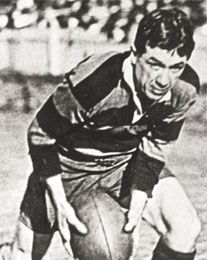
#21 Arthur Halloway, a player and coach

#35 Pat Walsh, a devotion to duty

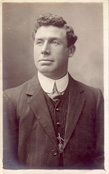
#67 Chris McKivat, Olympian & dual code int'l

#72 Peter Burge, from a footballing family

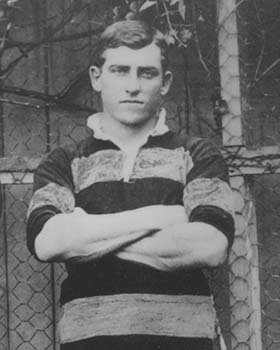
#76 Chook Fraser youngest Kangaroo

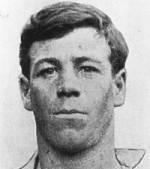
#77 Herb Gilbert

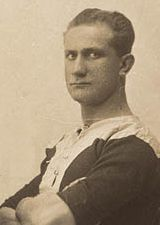
#88 Frank Burge Kangaroo brother

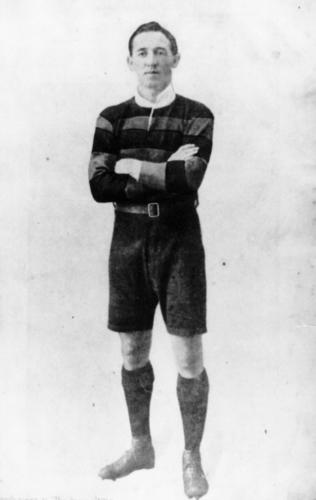
#89 Harold Horder, speedy winger

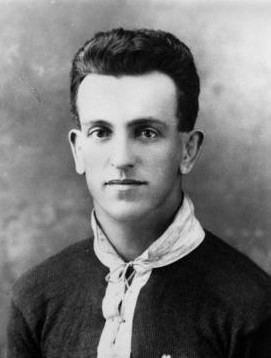
#106 Duncan Thompson Western front veteran

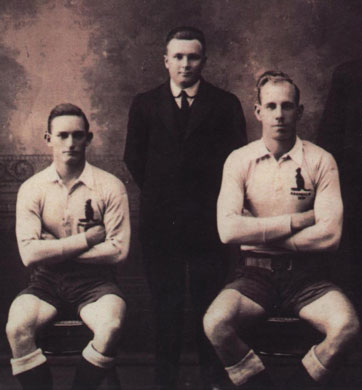
#113 Mucka Fewin (l) & # 111 Norm Potter (r) Queenslanders

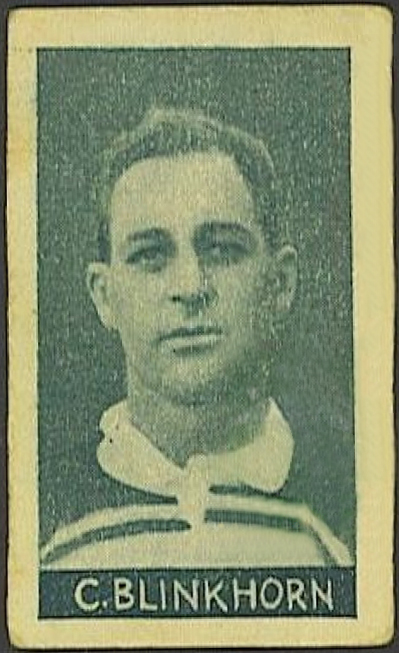
#116 Cec Blinkhorn, tour try-scoring record holder

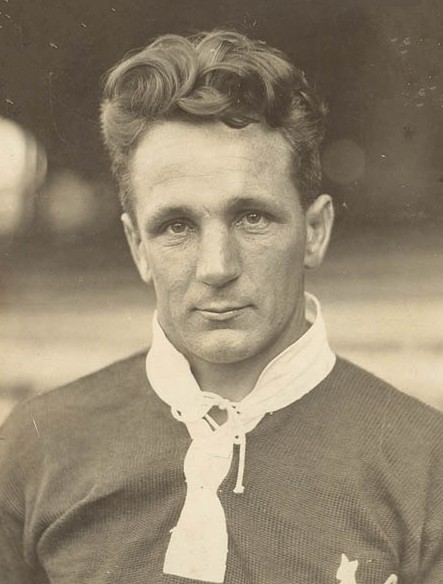
#118 Jim Craig, captain & veteran coach

#130 Tom Gorman 1st Queenslander as captain

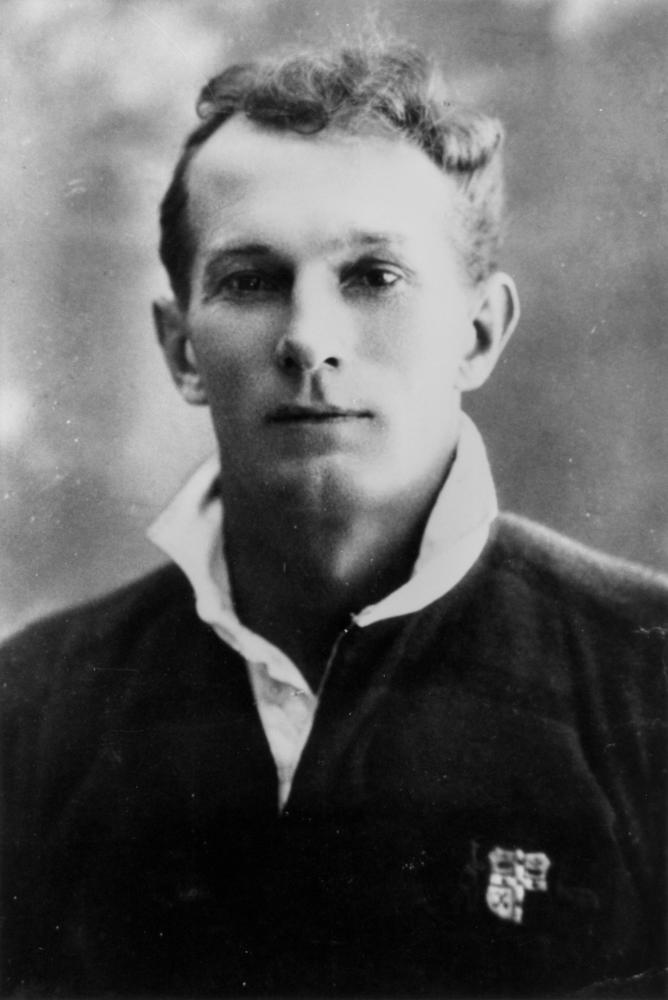
#141 Herb Steinohrt, hard Queensland leader

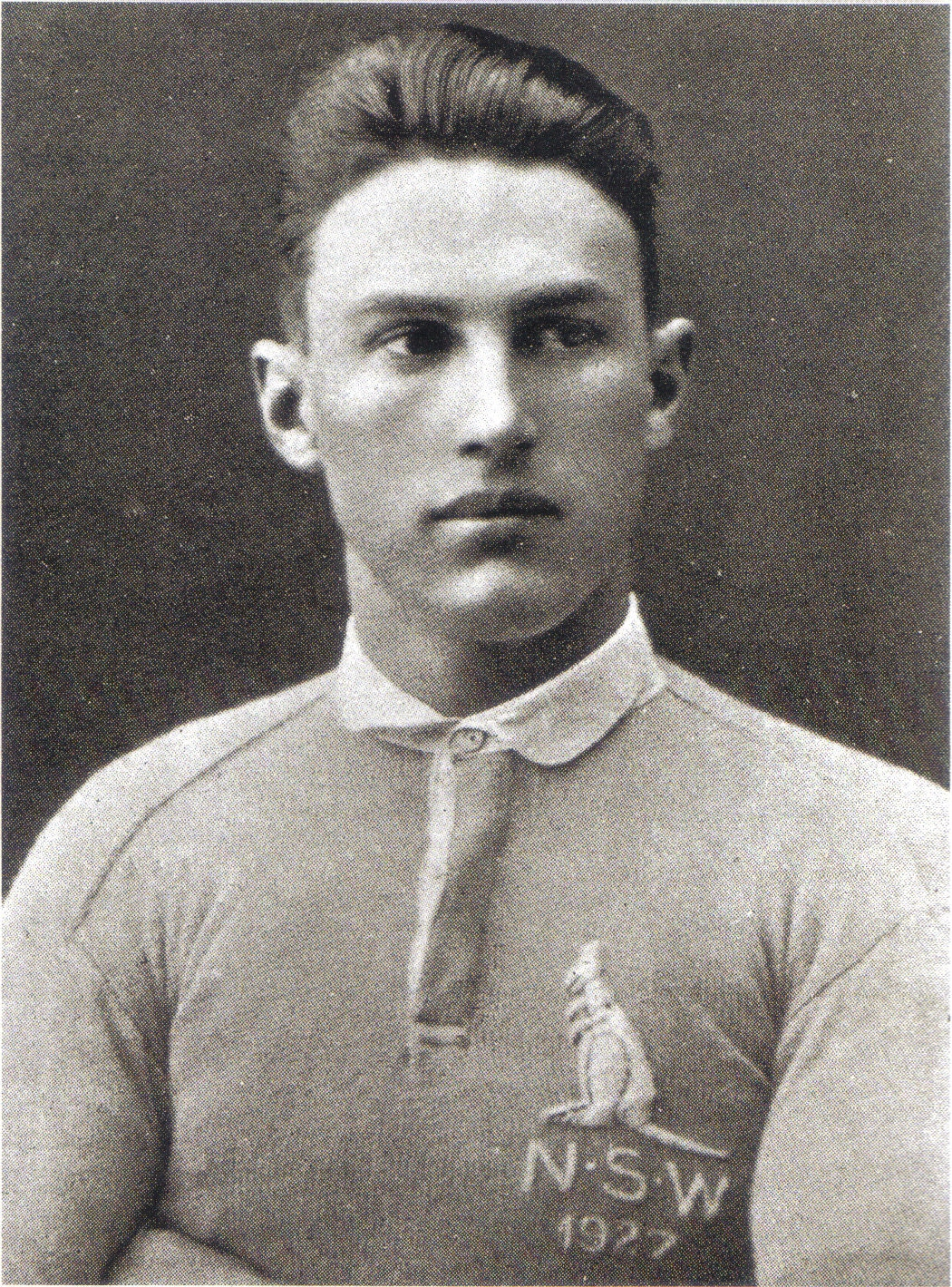
#142 George Treweek, tryscoring forward

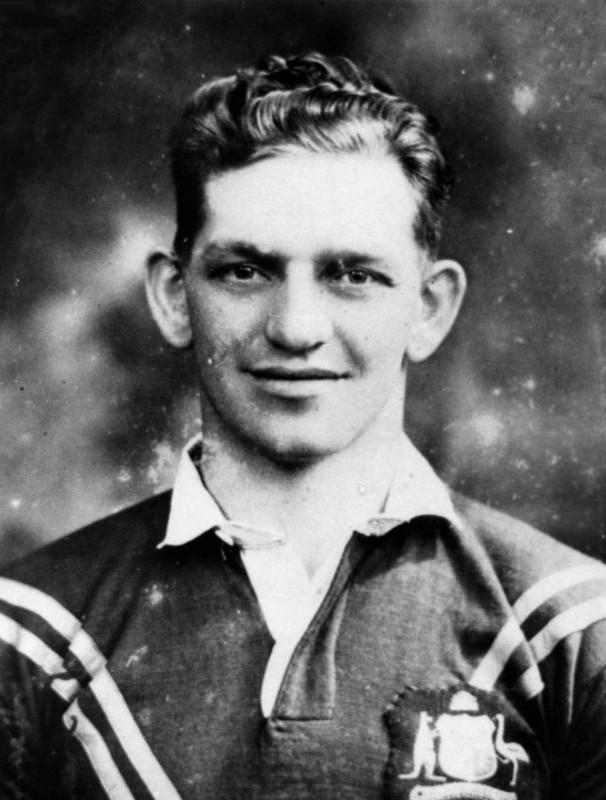
#159 Mick Madsen, Queenslander & captain

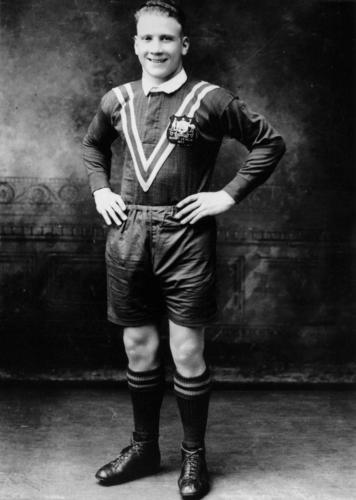
#185 Vic Hey

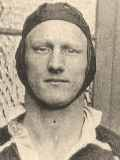
#176 Dave Brown record holding try scorer

#274 Keith Holman half-back & top-grade referee

No.	Name	Selected^{a}	Club^{b}	Matches^{c}
1	Arthur Hennessy	1908	South Sydney	2
2	Frank Cheadle	1908	Newtown	5
3	James Davis	1908	South Sydney	3
4	Jim Devereux	1908	North Sydney	5
5	Micky Dore	1908	North Brisbane	3
6	Bob Graves	1908	Balmain	6
7	Charlie Hedley	1908	Glebe	3
8	Denis Lutge	1908	North Sydney	3
9	Doug McLean Sr.	1908	Brisbane	2
10	Herbert ‘Dally’ Messenger	1908	Eastern Suburbs (Sydney)	7
11	Larry ‘Jersey’ O’Malley	1908	Eastern Suburbs (Sydney)	5
12	Albert Rosenfeld	1908	Eastern Suburbs (Sydney)	4
13	John Rosewell	1908	South Sydney	1
14	Bob Tubman	1908	Blackstone	2
15	Edward Baird	1908	North Brisbane	1
16	Bill Hardcastle	1908	? (Ipswich)	7
17	Sid ‘Sandy’ Pearce	1908	Eastern Suburbs (Sydney)	14
18	George Watson	1908	Brisbane	1
19	Tommy Anderson	1908	South Sydney	1
20	Billy Cann	1908	South Sydney	8
21	Arthur ‘Pony’ Halloway	1908	Glebe	10
22	Lou Jones	1908	Eastern Suburbs (Sydney)	2
23	Ernest Anlezark	1908	NSWRU	1
24	Arthur Butler	1908	South Sydney	3
25	Dan Frawley	1908	Eastern Suburbs (Sydney)	7
26	Andy Morton	1908	North Sydney	1
27	Jim Abercrombie	1908	Western Suburbs (Sydney)	2
28	Mick Bolewski	1908	Bundaberg	4
29	Alex Burdon	1908	Glebe	2
30	Sid Deane	1908	North Sydney	5
31	Bill Heidke	1908	Bundaberg	4
32	Albert Conlon	1908	Glebe	3
33	Tom McCabe	1908	Glebe	2
34	Alf ‘Bullock’ Dobbs	1908	Balmain	0
35	Pat Walsh	1908	Newcastle	3
36	Bill Bailey	1908	Newcastle	0
37	Tedda Courtney	1908	Newtown	11
38	Peter Moir	1908	Glebe	0
39	Bill Noble	1908	Newtown	6
40	Albert Broomham	1909	North Sydney	5
41	Mick Frawley	1909	Eastern Suburbs (Sydney)	1
42	Fred Woolley	1909	Balmain	2
43	Vic Anderson	1909	South Brisbane	1
44	Harold Dickins	1909	Fortitude Valley	1
45	George Duffin	1909	Toombul	2
46	Dugald McGregor	1909	Bundaberg	2
47	Bob Nicholson	1909	South Brisbane	2
48	Charlie Woodhead	1909	Brisbane	4
49	Jack Leveson	1909	South Sydney	1
50	William ‘Webby’ Neill	1909	South Sydney	0
51	Johnno Stuntz	1909	Eastern Suburbs (Sydney)	0
52	Dave Brown	1909	Eastern Suburbs (Sydney)	0
53	Stan Carpenter	1909	Newcastle	0
54	Arthur Bollard	1909	North Sydney	0
55	Herb Brackenreg	1909	Eastern Suburbs (Sydney)	3
56	Arthur O'Brien	1909	Fortitude Valley	0
57	Ernie Patfield	1909	Newcastle	0
58	Harold Heidke	1909	Bundaberg	1
59	Charles Ross	1909		0
60	Arch Harvey	1909	Bundaberg	0
61	Edward Buckley	1909	Fortitude Valley	1
62	Sid Fenelley	1909		0
63	Jack Barnett	1910	Newtown	3
64	Robert Craig	1910	Balmain	7
65	Bill Farnsworth	1910	Newtown	4
66	Jack Hickey	1910	Glebe	2
67	Chris McKivat	1910	Glebe	5
68	Charlie ‘Boxer’ Russell	1910	Newtown	3
69	Bill Spence	1910	South Sydney	1
70	Con Sullivan	1910	North Sydney	5
71	Tom Berecry	1911	North Sydney	1
72	Peter Burge	1911	Glebe	0
73	Steve Darmody	1911	South Sydney	0
74	Viv Farnsworth	1911	Newtown	6
75	Arthur Francis	1911	Newton Rangers(Auckland)	2
76	Charles ‘Chook’ Fraser	1911	Balmain	11
77	Herb Gilbert	1911	South Sydney	7
78	George Gillett	1911	No Club, NZ	0
79	Howard Hallett	1911	South Sydney	6
80	Patrick McCue	1911	Newtown	4
81	Charles McMurtrie	1911	Balmain	0
82	Joe Murray	1911	Newtown	0
83	Charles Savory	1911	Ponsonby Ponies	0
84	Bob Stuart	1911	Annandale	0
85	Robert Williams	1911	Eastern Suburbs (Sydney)	2
86	Frank Woodward	1911	North Shore Albions, NZ	0
87	Henry Bolewski	1914	Bundaberg	1
88	Frank Burge	1914	Glebe	13
89	Harold Horder	1914	South Sydney	13
90	Bill Kelly	1914	Balmain	1
91	Ray Norman	1914	South Sydney	2
92	Jack ‘Bluey’ Watkins	1914	Eastern Suburbs (Sydney)	7
93	Wally Messenger	1914	Eastern Suburbs (Sydney)	2
94	Bob Tidyman	1914	Eastern Suburbs (Sydney)	2
95	Les Cubitt	1919	Eastern Suburbs (Sydney)	4
96	Albert ‘Ricketty’ Johnston	1919	Newtown	8
97	Claud O'Donnell	1919	Carltons (Brisbane)	4
98	Arthur Oxford	1919	South Sydney	5
99	Clarrie Prentice	1919	Western Suburbs (Sydney)	5
100	Jack Robinson	1919	Balmain	5
101	Felix Ryan	1919	Newtown	4
102	Tom Sweeney	1919	Western Suburbs (Brisbane)	2
103	Bill Paten	1919	West End (Ipswich)	2
104	Norm Potter	1919	Western Suburbs (Brisbane)	7
105	Charlie Thorogood	1919	Coorparoo	2
106	Bill Schultz	1919	Balmain	7
107	Duncan Thompson	1919	North Sydney	9
108	Dick Townsend	1919	Newtown	3
109	Dick Vest	1919	Western Suburbs (Sydney)	7
110	John Kerwick	1919	South Sydney	0
111	Reg Latta	1919	Balmain	4
112	Neville Broadfoot	1920	Coorparoo	1
113	Harry Fewin	1920	Carltons (Brisbane)	1
114	Bert Gray	1920	Glebe	4
115	Bill Richards	1920	Western Suburbs (Brisbane)	4
116	Cec Blinkhorn	1921	North Sydney	4
117	Harry Caples	1921	Eastern Suburbs (Sydney)	2
118	Jimmy Craig	1921	Balmain	7
119	Clarrie Ives	1921	North Sydney	1
120	Bert Laing	1921	City Rovers (Auckland)	0
121	Rex Norman	1921	Eastern Suburbs (Sydney)	0
122	Herman Peters	1921	North Sydney	0
123	George Carstairs	1921	St. George	2
124	Ted McGrath	1921	South Sydney	0
125	Edwin Brown	1921	Newtown (Toowoomba)	0
126	Cecil Aynsley	1924	Western Suburbs (Brisbane)	4
127	Jim Bennett	1924	Brothers (Toowoomba)	3
128	Alf ‘Smacker’ Blair	1924	South Sydney	1
129	Eric Frauenfelder	1924	Brothers (Ipswich)	3
130	Tom Gorman	1924	Brothers (Toowoomba)	10
131	Alf O'Connor	1924	South Sydney	3
132	Horrie Watt	1924	Balmain	3
133	Vic Armbruster	1924	Valleys (Toowoomba)	8
134	Johnny Hunt	1924	Starlights (Ipswich)	2
135	Dan Dempsey	1928	Booval	7
136	Arthur Edwards	1928	Fortitude Valley	1
137	Eric Freestone	1928	Tumut	1
138	Nelson Hardy	1928	Eastern Suburbs (Sydney)	3
139	Arthur ‘Snowy’ Justice	1928	St. George	5
140	Fred Laws	1928	Newtown (Toowoomba)	6
141	Herb Steinohrt	1928	Valleys (Toowoomba)	9
142	George Treweek	1928	South Sydney	7
143	Colin York	1928	Queanbeyan	2
144	Joe ‘Chimpy’ Busch	1928	Eastern Suburbs (Sydney)	6
145	Hugh Byrne	1928	Eastern Suburbs (Sydney)	1
146	Pat Maher	1928	South Sydney	1
147	Eric Weissel	1928	Temora	8
148	Jack Kingston	1928	Young	3
149	Cliff Pearce	1928	Tamworth	7
150	Benny Wearing	1928	South Sydney	1
151	William Brogan	1929	Western Suburbs (Sydney)	3
152	Cec Fifield	1929	Western Suburbs (Sydney)	4
153	Arthur Henderson	1929	Booval	0
154	Frank McMillan	1929	Western Suburbs (Sydney)	9
155	Bill ‘Snowy’ Spencer	1929	Bundaberg	4
156	George Bishop	1929	Balmain	2
157	Harry Finch	1929	South Sydney	0
158	Jack Holmes	1929	Newtown	0
159	Peter ‘Mick’ Madsen	1929	Brothers (Toowoomba)	9
160	Wally Prigg	1929	Centrals (Newcastle)	19
161	Edward Root	1929	South Sydney	0
162	Jack Upton	1929	Souths (Toowoomba)	0
163	Harry Kadwell	1929	South Sydney	0
164	Alan Ridley	1929	Queanbeyan	5
165	Bill Shankland	1929	Eastern Suburbs (Sydney)	4
166	Les Sellars	1929	Starlights (Ipswich)	0
167	Hector Gee	1932	Tivoli	3
168	Jack Little	1932	Fortitude Valley	1
169	Ernie Norman	1932	Eastern Suburbs (Sydney)	12
170	Sid ‘Joe’ Pearce	1932	Eastern Suburbs (Sydney)	13
171	Joe Wilson	1932	Brothers (Ipswich)	3
172	Les Heidke	1932	Tivoli	9
173	Frank O'Connor	1932	South Sydney	4
174	Bill Christie	1932	Coorparoo	1
175	Fred Neumann	1932	Fortitude Valley	1
176	Dave Brown	1933	Eastern Suburbs (Sydney)	9
177	Henry Denny	1933	Western Suburbs (Brisbane)	0
178	Frank Doonar	1933	Rialto (Ipswich)	0
179	Arthur Folwell	1933	Newtown	2
180	Ray Stehr	1933	Eastern Suburbs (Sydney)	11
181	Viv Thicknesse	1933	Eastern Suburbs (Sydney)	7
182	Frank Curran	1933	South Sydney	10
183	Joe Doyle	1933	Brothers (Toowoomba)	1
184	Jim Gibbs	1933	South Newcastle	7
185	Vic Hey	1933	Western Suburbs (Sydney)	6
186	Les Mead	1933	Western Suburbs (Sydney)	1
187	Bill ‘Circy’ Smith	1933	Starlights (Ipswich)	1
188	Fred Gardner	1933	St. George	1
189	Jack Why	1933	South Sydney	2
190	Melville Glasheen	1933	Estates (Townsville)	0
191	Fred Gilbert	1933	Valleys (Toowoomba)	4
192	Percy Fairall	1935	St. George	5
193	Ray Hines	1935	Maitland	3
194	Bill Mahon	1935	Newtown (Toowoomba)	1
195	Ross McKinnon	1935	Eastern Suburbs (Sydney)	8
196	Laurie Ward	1935	Eastern Suburbs (Sydney)	10
197	Henry Bichel	1935	East Ipswich	0
198	Edward Collins	1935	Norths (Brisbane)	0
199	Sid Goodwin	1935	Balmain	3
200	Eric Lewis	1935	South Sydney	9
201	Mick Shields	1935	Quirindi	0
202	Gordon Whittle	1935	(Toowoomba)	0
203	Jack Beaton	1936	Eastern Suburbs (Sydney)	10
204	Arch Crippin	1936	North Sydney	3
205	Charlie Hazelton	1937	Port Kembla	1
206	Doug McLean Jr.	1937	Starlights (Ipswich)	2
207	Fred Nolan	1937	North Sydney	2
208	Percy Williams	1937	South Sydney	4
209	Len Dawson	1937	Eastern Suburbs (Newcastle)	5
210	Frank Griffiths	1937	Balmain	0
211	Gordon McLennan	1937	Newtown	0
212	Jack Reardon	1937	Norths (Brisbane)	4
213	Harry Robison	1937	Toowoomba	0
214	Roy Thompson	1937	North Sydney	0
215	Andy Norval	1937	Eastern Suburbs (Sydney)	3
216	Harry Pierce	1937	Eastern Suburbs (Sydney)	5
217	Bert Williams	1937	West Wyalong	3
218	Herb Narvo	1937	Newtown	4
219	Ron Bailey	1946	Canterbury-Bankstown	2
220	Arthur Clues	1946	Western Suburbs (Sydney)	3
221	Lionel Cooper	1946	Eastern Suburbs (Sydney)	3
222	Pat Devery	1946	Balmain	3
223	Frank ‘Bumper’ Farrell	1946	Newtown	4
224	Johnny Grice	1946	Souths (Brisbane)	2
225	Joe Jorgenson	1946	Balmain	3
226	Reg Kay	1946	Western Suburbs (Brisbane)	3
227	Noel Mulligan	1946	Newtown	10
228	Edgar Newham	1946	Canterbury-Bankstown	2
229	Dave Parkinson	1946	Balmain	3
230	George Watt	1946	Eastern Suburbs (Sydney)	3
231	Roy Westaway	1946	Barcaldine	2
232	Jack Hutchinson	1946	Norths (Newcastle)	1
233	Jim Armstrong	1946	South Sydney	1
234	Trevor Eather	1946	Boggabri	1
235	Clem Kennedy	1946	South Sydney	1
236	Noel White	1946	Kurri Kurri	1
237	Eddie Brosnan	1948	Brothers (Brisbane)	1
238	Fred de Belin	1948	Balmain	8
239	Keith Froome	1948	Newtown	8
240	Johnny Graves	1948	South Sydney	7
241	Pat McMahon	1948	All Whites (Toowoomba)	8
242	Wally O'Connell	1948	Eastern Suburbs (Sydney)	10
243	Len Pegg	1948	Souths (Brisbane)	2
244	Noel Pidding	1948	St. George	16
245	Jack Rayner	1948	South Sydney	5
246	Kevin Schubert	1948	Wollongong	19
247	Len Smith	1948	Newtown	2
248	Bill Tyquin	1948	Souths (Brisbane)	6
249	Clive Churchill	1948	South Sydney	37
250	Duncan Hall	1948	Fortitude Valley	23
251	Nevyl Hand	1948	North Sydney	2
252	Jack Holland	1948	St. George	7
253	Henry Benton	1948	Centrals (Townsville)	0
254	Vic Bulgin	1948	Eastern Suburbs (Sydney)	0
255	Bobby Dimond	1948	Dapto	0
256	Alf Gibbs	1948	South Newcastle	5
257	Johnny Hawke	1948	Canberra	4
258	Bruce Hopkins	1948	Canterbury-Bankstown	0
259	Jack Horrigan	1948	Fortitude Valley	1
260	Bob Lulham	1948	Balmain	3
261	Doug McRitchie	1948	St. George	5
262	Col Maxwell	1948	Western Suburbs (Sydney)	1
263	Les Cowie	1948	South Sydney	6
264	Billy Thompson	1948	Valleys (Toowoomba)	1
265	Frank Johnson	1948	Newtown	0
266	Kevin Hansen	1949	Western Suburbs (Sydney)	1
267	Ian Johnston	1949	Parramatta	1
268	Matt McCoy	1949	St. George	2
269	Ron Roberts	1949	St. George	2
270	Frank Stanmore	1949	Western Suburbs (Sydney)	10
271	Alan Thompson	1949	Souths (Brisbane)	3
272	Roy Bull	1949	Manly-Warringah	23
273	Ron Griffiths	1949	? (Ipswich)	0
274	Keith Holman	1950	Western Suburbs (Sydney)	32
275	Keith Middleton	1950	North Sydney	3
276	Jack Troy	1950	Newtown	2
277	Ned Andrews	1950	Mackay	1
278	Harold ‘Mick’ Crocker	1950	Souths (Brisbane)	15
279	Denis Flannery	1950	Brothers (Ipswich)	15
280	Bernie Purcell	1950	South Sydney	1
281	Johnny Bliss	1951	Manly-Warringah	1
282	Brian Davies	1951	Brothers (Brisbane)	33
283	Denis Donoghue	1951	South Sydney	2
284	Noel Hazzard	1951	Bundaberg	13
285	Gordon Willoughby	1951	Manly-Warringah	2
286	Bernie Drew	1951	Brothers (Bundaberg)	3
287	Col Geelan	1951	Newtown	8
288	Ernie Hammerton	1951	South Sydney	1
289	Ferris Ashton	1952	Eastern Suburbs (Sydney)	8
290	Rees Duncan	1952	Kurri Kurri	2
291	Charlie Gill	1952	Norths (Newcastle)	7
292	Albert Paul	1952	Lakes United	4
293	Jack Rooney	1952	All Whites (Toowoomba)	2
294	Col Donohoe	1952	Eastern Suburbs (Sydney)	2
295	Jack Lumsden	1952	Manly-Warringah	1
296	Des McGovern	1952	Newtown (Toowoomba)	7
297	Tom Tyrrell	1952	Balmain	6
298	Brian Carlson	1952	Norths (Newcastle)	17
299	Tommy Ryan	1952	St. George	4
300	Arthur Collinson	1952	Western Suburbs (Sydney)	3
301	Greg Hawick	1952	South Sydney	6
302	Ken Kearney	1952	St. George	31
303	Ken McCaffery	1952	Souths (Toowoomba)	5
304	Harry Wells	1952	Wollongong	21
305	Ron Willey	1952	Canterbury-Bankstown	0
306	Bob Banks	1953	Newtown (Toowoomba)	14
307	Alan Hornery	1953	Western Suburbs (Brisbane)	0
308	Alex Watson	1953	Western Suburbs (Brisbane)	19
309	Kel O'Shea	1954	Ayr Colts	15
310	Norm Provan	1954	St. George	14
311	Bob Sullivan	1954	North Sydney	1
312	Peter Diversi	1954	North Sydney	2
313	Ian Moir	1954	South Sydney	8
314	Darcy Henry	1955	Forbes	2
315	Henry Holloway	1955	Newtown	3
316	Ross Kite	1955	St. George	5
317	Graham Laird	1955	Toowoomba	2
318	Dick Poole	1955	Newtown	13
319	Don ‘Bandy’ Adams	1956	Scone	3
320	Cyril Connell Jr.	1956	Brothers (Rockhampton)	2
321	Ian ‘Ripper’ Doyle	1956	All Whites (Toowoomba)	7
322	Ken McCrohon	1956	Western Suburbs (Brisbane)	1
323	Tom Tyquin	1956	Souths (Brisbane)	6
324	Gordon Clifford	1956	Newtown	8
325	Norm Pope	1956	Fortitude Valley	1
326	Kevin O'Brien	1956	St. George	0
327	Bryan Orrock	1956	St. George	2
328	Don Furner	1956	Souths (Toowoomba)	1
329	Bill Marsh	1956	Cootamundra	8
330	Tom Payne	1956	All Whites (Toowoomba)	1
331	Keith Barnes	1957	Balmain	14
332	Brian Clay	1957	St. George	8
333	Don Schofield	1957	Western Suburbs (Sydney)	2
334	Ray Ritchie	1957	Manly-Warringah	1
335	Tony Brown	1958	Newtown	10
336	Rex Mossop	1958	Manly-Warringah	12
337	Peter Dimond	1958	Western Suburbs (Sydney)	10
338	Dud Beattie	1959	Railways (Ipswich)	18
339	Reg Gasnier	1959	St. George	39
340	Noel Kelly	1959	Brothers (Ipswich)	25
341	Trevor McDonald	1959	Innisfail	1
342	Barry Muir	1959	Western Suburbs (Brisbane)	25
343	Jim Paterson	1959	South Townsville	8
344	Johnny Raper	1959	St. George	39
345	Billy Wilson	1959	St. George	11
346	Eddie Lumsden	1959	St. George	15
347	Ron Boden	1959	Valleys (Toowoomba)	3
348	Elton Rasmussen	1959	All Whites (Toowoomba)	15
349	Johnny Riley	1959	St. George	1
350	Bob Bugden	1959	St. George	2
351	Peter Burke	1959	Manly-Warringah	0
352	Darrel Chapman	1959	Kempsey	0
353	Bill Delamere	1959	Manly-Warringah	0
354	Brian Hambly	1959	Wagga Wagga Magpies	18
355	Ken Irvine	1959	North Sydney	31
356	Gary Parcell	1959	Brothers (Ipswich)	8
357	Ian Walsh	1959	Eugowra	25
358	Don Parish	1959	Macquarie	3
359	Lionel Morgan	1960	Wynnum-Manly Seagulls	3
360	Billy Rayner	1960	Parramatta	2
361	Ray Beavan	1961	Tumut	0
362	Ron Crowe	1961	West Wyalong	5
363	Ken Day	1961	Western Suburbs (Brisbane)	9
364	Ron Lynch	1961	Parramatta	12
365	Jack Sinclair	1961	Manly-Warringah	1
366	Frank Drake	1961	Souths (Brisbane)	2
367	Bob Gehrke	1961	Redcliffe	0
368	Alan Gil	1961	Cairns	2
369	Bill Owen	1961	Norths (Newcastle)	1
370	Arthur Summons	1961	Western Suburbs (Sydney)	9
371	Michael Cleary	1962	South Sydney	8
372	Bob Hagan	1962	Townsville	2
373	Bill Carson	1962	Western Suburbs (Sydney)	2
374	George Smith	1962	Lithgow	1
375	Mick Veivers	1962	Souths (Brisbane)	6
376	Jimmy Lisle	1962	South Sydney	13
377	Peter Gallagher	1963	Brothers (Brisbane)	17
378	Earl Harrison	1963	Gilgandra	9
379	Graeme Langlands	1963	St. George	45
380	Peter Provan	1963	Balmain	1
381	Ken Thornett	1963	Parramatta	12
382	Les Johns	1963	Canterbury-Bankstown	14
383	Dick Thornett	1963	Parramatta	11
384	Paul Quinn	1963	Gerringong	7
385	Barry Rushworth	1963	Lithgow	1
386	Kevin Ryan	1963	St. George	2
387	Kevin Smyth	1963	Western Suburbs (Sydney)	2
388	Frank Stanton	1963	Manly-Warringah	0
389	Graham Wilson	1963	Newtown	3
390	John Cleary	1963	Ipswich	0
391	John Gleeson	1963	Wynnum-Manly Seagulls	10
392	Billy Smith	1964	St. George	26
393	Barry Beath	1965	Eugowra	0
394	Noel Cavanagh	1965	Brothers (Brisbane)	0
395	John Morgan	1965	Manly-Warringah	2
396	Lloyd Weier	1965	North Sydney	3
397	Garry Wellington	1965	Burdekin	0
398	Nick Yakich	1965	Manly-Warringah	0
399	Allan Buman	1965	Western Suburbs (Newcastle)	2
400	Terry Pannowitz	1965	Maitland	0
401	Gary Banks	1966	Souths (Newcastle)	1
402	Bill Bradstreet	1966	Manly-Warringah	1
403	Angelo Crema	1966	Tully	1
404	Johnny King	1966	St. George	24
405	John McDonald	1966	Valleys (Toowoomba)	13
406	Johnny Greaves	1966	Canterbury-Bankstown	9
407	John Wittenberg	1966	Theodore	6
408	Arthur Beetson	1966	Balmain	29
409	Brian Fitzsimmons	1967	Burdekin	3
410	Les Hanigan	1967	Manly-Warringah	2
411	Allan Thomson	1967	Lakes United	3
412	Dennis Tutty	1967	Balmain	1
413	Geoff Connell	1967	Balmain	1
414	Dennis Manteit	1967	Brothers (Brisbane)	5
415	Kevin Goldspink	1967	Canterbury-Bankstown	0
416	Tony Branson	1967	Nowra District	1
417	Ron Coote	1967	South Sydney	23
418	Brian Moore	1967	Newtown	0
419	John Sattler	1967	South Sydney	4
420	Elwyn Walters	1967	South Sydney	12
421	Noel Gallagher	1967	Bundaberg	2
422	Kevin Junee	1967	Eastern Suburbs (Sydney)	0
423	Ron Saddler	1967	Eastern Suburbs (Sydney)	0
424	Fred Jones	1968	Manly-Warringah	0
425	Johnny Rhodes	1968	Canterbury-Bankstown	0
426	Eric Simms	1968	South Sydney	8
427	Bob Fulton	1968	Manly-Warringah	35
428	Brian James	1968	South Sydney	1
429	Lionel Williamson	1968	Innisfail	5
430	Ron Costello	1969	Canterbury-Bankstown	3
431	Jeff Denman	1969	Eastern Suburbs (Brisbane)	0
432	Bob Honan	1969	South Sydney	2
433	Denis Pittard	1969	South Sydney	2
434	Ian Robson	1969	Western Suburbs (Brisbane)	0
435	Dennis Ward	1969	Manly-Warringah	5
436	Col Weiss	1969	Wanderers Bundaberg	3
437	John Cootes	1969	Western Suburbs (Newcastle)	7
438	Graham Lye	1969	Parramatta	0
439	Bob McCarthy	1969	South Sydney	10
440	John Brass	1970	Eastern Suburbs (Sydney)	3
441	Phil Hawthorne	1970	St. George	3
442	Jim Morgan	1970	South Sydney	2
443	Ray Laird	1970	Railways (Rockhampton)	1
444	Bob Grant	1970	South Sydney	2
445	Allan McKean	1970	Eastern Suburbs (Sydney)	1
446	Ray Branighan	1970	South Sydney	8
447	Ron Turner	1970	Cronulla-Sutherland	1
448	Mark Harris	1970	Eastern Suburbs (Sydney)	1
449	John O'Neill	1970	South Sydney	10
450	Bob O'Reilly	1970	Parramatta	16
451	Paul Sait	1970	South Sydney	16
452	Gary Sullivan	1970	Newtown	7
453	Barry McTaggart	1970	Balmain	1
454	Johnny Brown	1970	Norths (Brisbane)	1
455	Wayne Bennett	1971	Warwick	0
456	Keith Campbell	1971	Parramatta	1
457	Jim Murphy	1971	Western Suburbs (Sydney)	1
458	Tommy Raudonikis	1971	Western Suburbs (Sydney)	29
459	Geoff Starling	1971	Balmain	11
460	George Ambrum	1972	North Sydney Bears	2
461	John Elford	1972	Western Suburbs (Sydney)	4
462	Tim Pickup	1972	North Sydney Bears	11
463	Ted Goodwin	1972	St. George	4
464	Wayne Stewart	1972	Western Suburbs (Brisbane)	1
465	Stephen Knight	1972	Western Suburbs (Sydney)	2
466	John Grant	1972	Souths (Brisbane)	3
467	Gary Stevens	1972	South Sydney	11
468	Terry Randall	1973	Manly-Warringah	11
469	Mick Cronin	1973	Gerringong	33
470	Graham Eadie	1973	Manly-Warringah	25
471	Bill Hamilton	1973	Manly-Warringah	0
472	John Lang	1973	Eastern Suburbs (Brisbane)	8
473	Ken Maddison	1973	Cronulla-Sutherland	4
474	Warren Orr	1973	Western Suburbs (Brisbane)	2
475	Greg Pierce	1973	Cronulla-Sutherland	8
476	Steve Rogers	1973	Cronulla-Sutherland	24
477	David Waite	1973	Western Suburbs (Illawarra)	6
478	Ray Higgs	1974	Parramatta	9
479	Geoff Richardson	1974	Western Suburbs (Brisbane)	2
480	Chris Anderson	1975	Canterbury-Bankstown	11
481	Terry Fahey	1975	Wellington Roosters	6
482	Lew Platz	1975	Wynnum-Manly Seagulls	6
483	Ross Strudwick	1975	Fortitude Valley	1
484	David Wright	1975	Brothers (Brisbane)	1
485	John Donnelly	1975	Western Suburbs Magpies	4
486	Denis Fitzgerald	1975	Parramatta Eels	5
487	Ian Mackay	1975	Eastern Suburbs (Sydney)	3
488	Johnny Mayes	1975	Eastern Suburbs (Sydney)	3
489	John Peard	1975	Eastern Suburbs (Sydney)	8
490	George Piggins	1975	South Sydney	3
491	John Quayle	1975	Parramatta Eels	3
492	Ian Schubert	1975	Eastern Suburbs (Sydney)	4
493	Greg Veivers	1975	Souths (Brisbane)	6
494	Allan McMahon	1975	Balmain	5
495	Jim Porter	1975	Parramatta Eels	2
496	Nick Geiger	1977	Norths (Brisbane)	4
497	Rod Reddy	1977	St. George	17
498	Mark Thomas	1977	Brothers (Brisbane)	3
499	Rod Morris	1977	Eastern Suburbs (Brisbane)	19
500	Steve Crear	1977	Western Suburbs (Brisbane)	0
501	Russel Gartner	1977	Manly-Warringah Sea Eagles	2
502	John Kolc	1977	Parramatta Eels	1
503	Kerry Boustead	1978	Souths (Innisfail)	25
504	Steve Morris	1978	Dapto	1
505	Greg Oliphant	1978	Redcliffe	2
506	Graham Olling	1978	Parramatta Eels	5
507	George Peponis	1978	Canterbury-Bankstown Bulldogs	8
508	Ray Price	1978	Parramatta Eels	22
509	Ian Thomson	1978	Manly-Warringah Sea Eagles	3
510	John Dorahy	1978	Western Suburbs Magpies	2
511	Neville Glover	1978	Parramatta Eels	2
512	Greg Platz	1978	Wattles (Toowoomba)	1
513	Max Krilich	1978	Manly-Warringah Sea Eagles	13
514	Craig Young	1978	St. George Dragons	20
515	Les Boyd	1978	Western Suburbs Magpies	17
516	Larry Corowa	1978	Balmain Tigers	2
517	Bruce Walker	1978	Manly-Warringah Sea Eagles	0
518	Geoff Gerard	1978	Parramatta Eels	6
519	Ron Hilditch	1978	Parramatta Eels	3
520	Steve Kneen	1978	Cronulla-Sutherland Sharks	0
521	Steve Martin	1978	Manly-Warringah Sea Eagles	1
522	Alan Thompson	1978	Manly-Warringah Sea Eagles	7
523	John Gibbs	1978	Manly-Warringah Sea Eagles	0
524	Greg Brentnall	1980	Canterbury-Bankstown Bulldogs	13
525	Garry Dowling	1980	Parramatta Eels	2
526	Chris Close	1980	Redcliffe	3
527	Rohan Hancock	1980	Wattles (Toowoomba)	3
528	Jim Leis	1980	Western Suburbs Magpies	0
529	Graham Quinn	1980	St. George Dragons	1
530	Graeme Wynn	1980	St. George Dragons	0
531	Wally Lewis	1981	Fortitude Valley	33
532	Jeff Masterman	1981	Eastern Suburbs Roosters	2
533	Paul McCabe	1981	Eastern Suburbs Roosters	5
534	Steve Mortimer	1981	Canterbury-Bankstown Bulldogs	8
535	John Ribot	1981	Western Suburbs Magpies	9
536	Phil Sigsworth	1981	Newtown Jets	1
537	Royce Ayliffe	1981	Eastern Suburbs Roosters	1
538	John Muggleton	1982	Parramatta Eels	3
539	Paul Vautin	1982	Manly-Warringah Sea Eagles	13
540	Mal Meninga	1982	Souths (Brisbane)	46
541	Ray Brown	1982	Manly-Warringah Sea Eagles	5
542	Brett Kenny	1982	Parramatta Eels	17
543	Mark Murray	1982	Redcliffe	6
544	Greg Conescu	1982	Norths (Brisbane)	9
545	Steve Ella	1982	Parramatta Eels	4
546	Eric Grothe Sr.	1982	Parramatta Eels	8
547	Don McKinnon	1982	Manly-Warringah Sea Eagles	0
548	Gene Miles	1982	Wynnum-Manly Seagulls	14
549	Wayne Pearce	1982	Balmain Tigers	18
550	Peter Sterling	1982	Parramatta Eels	18
551	Dave Brown	1983	Manly-Warringah Sea Eagles	5
552	Wally Fullerton Smith	1983	Redcliffe	8
553	Pat Jarvis	1983	St. George Dragons	1
554	Colin Scott	1983	Wynnum-Manly Seagulls	1
555	Brad Tessmann	1983	Souths (Brisbane)	1
556	Ross Conlon	1984	Canterbury-Bankstown Bulldogs	1
557	Greg Dowling	1984	Wynnum-Manly Seagulls	12
558	Garry Jack	1984	Balmain Tigers	20
559	Bryan Niebling	1984	Redcliffe	13
560	Noel Cleal	1985	Manly-Warringah Sea Eagles	8
561	John Ferguson	1985	Eastern Suburbs Roosters	3
562	Steve Roach	1985	Balmain Tigers	19
563	Peter Tunks	1985	Canterbury-Bankstown Bulldogs	6
564	Peter Wynn	1985	Parramatta Eels	3
565	Benny Elias	1985	Balmain Tigers	5
566	Des Hasler	1985	Manly-Warringah Sea Eagles	12
567	Michael O'Connor	1985	St. George Dragons	17
568	Steve Folkes	1986	Canterbury-Bankstown Bulldogs	5
569	Terry Lamb	1986	Canterbury-Bankstown Bulldogs	7
570	Dale Shearer	1986	Manly-Warringah Sea Eagles	20
571	Royce Simmons	1986	Penrith Panthers	10
572	Les Kiss	1986	North Sydney Bears	4
573	Paul Dunn	1986	Canterbury-Bankstown Bulldogs	6
574	Bob Lindner	1986	Wynnum-Manly Seagulls	22
575	Chris Mortimer	1986	Canterbury-Bankstown Bulldogs	1
576	Paul Sironen	1986	Balmain Tigers	21
577	Les Davidson	1986	South Sydney Rabbitohs	4
578	Greg Alexander	1986	Penrith Panthers	6
579	Gary Belcher	1986	Canberra Raiders	15
580	Martin Bella	1986	North Sydney Bears	9
581	Paul Langmack	1986	Western Suburbs Magpies	0
582	Phil Daley	1986	Manly-Warringah Sea Eagles	3
583	Brian Johnston	1987	St. George Dragons	1
584	Sam Backo	1988	Canberra Raiders	6
585	Tony Currie	1988	Canterbury-Bankstown Bulldogs	7
586	Andrew Ettingshausen	1988	Cronulla-Sutherland Sharks	25^{d}
587	Peter Jackson	1988	Canberra Raiders	9
588	Allan Langer	1988	Brisbane Broncos	22^{d}
589	Gavin Miller	1988	Cronulla-Sutherland Sharks	1
590	Mark McGaw	1988	Cronulla-Sutherland Sharks	3
591	Alan McIndoe	1988	Illawarra Steelers	0
592	Andrew Farrar	1988	Canterbury-Bankstown Bulldogs	0
593	David Gillespie	1988	Canterbury-Bankstown Bulldogs	17
594	Michael Hancock	1989	Brisbane Broncos	13
595	Bruce McGuire	1989	Balmain Tigers	2
596	Dan Stains	1989	Cronulla-Sutherland Sharks	0
597	David Trewhella	1989	Eastern Suburbs Roosters	0
598	Kerrod Walters	1989	Brisbane Broncos	8
599	Bradley Clyde	1989	Canberra Raiders	18^{d}
600	Mark Carroll	1990	South Sydney Rabbitohs	12
601	Laurie Daley	1990	Canberra Raiders	21^{d}
602	Brad Mackay	1990	St. George Dragons	11
603	Glenn Lazarus	1990	Canberra Raiders	20^{d}
604	Ian Roberts	1990	Manly-Warringah Sea Eagles	13
605	John Cartwright	1990	Penrith Panthers	6
606	Chris Johns	1990	Brisbane Broncos	9
607	Brad Fittler	1990	Penrith Panthers	40
608	Mark Geyer	1990	Penrith Panthers	3
609	Cliff Lyons	1990	Manly-Warringah Sea Eagles	6
610	Mark Sargent	1990	Newcastle Knights	4
611	Ricky Stuart	1990	Canberra Raiders	9
612	Kevin Walters	1990	Brisbane Broncos	8
613	Paul Hauff	1991	Brisbane Broncos	1
614	Steve Walters	1991	Canberra Raiders	15^{d}
615	Willie Carne	1991	Brisbane Broncos	10
616	Craig Salvatori	1991	Eastern Suburbs Roosters	2
617	Rod Wishart	1991	Illawarra Steelers	17
618	Scott Gourley	1991	St. George Dragons	1
619	Geoff Toovey	1991	Manly-Warringah Sea Eagles	13
620	Gary Coyne	1991	Canberra Raiders	2
621	Andrew Gee	1991	Brisbane Broncos	0
622	Paul Harragon	1992	Newcastle Knights	20
623	Graham Mackay	1992	Penrith Panthers	1
624	Tim Brasher	1992	Balmain Tigers	15
625	Brad Godden	1992	Newcastle Knights	0
626	Steve Renouf	1992	Brisbane Broncos	9^{d}
627	David Fairleigh	1994	North Sydney Bears	15
628	Mark Hohn	1994	Brisbane Broncos	1
629	Paul McGregor	1994	Illawarra Steelers	3
630	Brett Mullins	1994	Canberra Raiders	5^{d}
631	Greg Florimo	1994	North Sydney Bears	4
632	Terry Hill	1994	Manly-Warringah Sea Eagles	9
633	Steve Menzies	1994	Manly-Warringah Sea Eagles	15
634	Wendell Sailor	1994	Brisbane Broncos	14^{d}
635	Jim Serdaris	1994	Western Suburbs Magpies	1
636	David Furner	1994	Canberra Raiders	1^{d}
637	Dean Pay	1994	Canterbury-Bankstown Bulldogs	10
638	Jason Smith	1994	Canterbury-Bankstown Bulldogs	15
639	Wayne Bartrim	1995	St. George Dragons	4
640	Mark Coyne	1995	St. George Dragons	9
641	Brett Dallas	1995	Sydney Bulldogs	5
642	Trevor Gillmeister	1995	South Queensland Crushers	3
643	Gary Larson	1995	North Sydney Bears	9
644	Danny Moore	1995	Manly-Warringah Sea Eagles	2
645	Adam Muir	1995	Newcastle Knights	2
646	Robbie O'Davis	1995	Newcastle Knights	8
647	Matthew Johns	1995	Newcastle Knights	9
648	Matt Sing	1995	Penrith Panthers	15
649	Jamie Ainscough	1995	Newcastle Knights	1
650	Jim Dymock	1995	Sydney Bulldogs	5
651	John Hopoate	1995	Manly-Warringah Sea Eagles	2
652	Andrew Johns	1995	Newcastle Knights	25
653	Nik Kosef	1995	Manly-Warringah Sea Eagles	10
654	Billy Moore	1995	North Sydney Bears	3
655	Aaron Raper	1995	Cronulla-Sutherland Sharks	1
656	Michael Buettner	1996	North Sydney Bears	1
657	Daniel Gartner	1996	Manly-Warringah Sea Eagles	1
658	Andrew Walker	1996	Sydney City Roosters	1
659	John Simon	1997	Parramatta Eels	1
660	Rodney Howe	1998	Melbourne Storm	4^{d}
661	Darren Lockyer	1998	Brisbane Broncos	59^{d}
662	Mat Rogers	1998	Cronulla-Sutherland Sharks	11
663	Brad Thorn	1998	Brisbane Broncos	3^{d}
664	Darren Britt	1998	Canterbury Bulldogs	8
665	Ben Ikin	1998	North Sydney Bears	2
666	Robbie Kearns	1998	Melbourne Storm	14^{d}
667	Steve Price	1998	Canterbury Bulldogs	16
668	Darren Smith	1998	Brisbane Broncos	7^{d}
669	Gorden Tallis	1998	Brisbane Broncos	8^{d}
670	Shane Webcke	1998	Brisbane Broncos	20^{d}
671	Jason Hetherington	1998	Canterbury Bulldogs	2
672	Bryan Fletcher	1999	Sydney City Roosters	8
673	Matthew Gidley	1999	Newcastle Knights	15
674	Craig Gower	1999	Penrith Panthers	18^{d}
675	Brett Kimmorley	1999	Melbourne Storm	20^{d}
676	Russell Richardson	1999	Cronulla-Sutherland Sharks	1^{d}
677	Robbie Ross	1999	Melbourne Storm	1
678	Jason Stevens	1999	Cronulla-Sutherland Sharks	8^{d}
679	Michael Vella	1999	Parramatta Eels	5
680	Ryan Girdler	1999	Penrith Panthers	10^{d}
681	Shaun Timmins	1999	St. George Illawarra Dragons	9
682	Scott Hill	2000	Melbourne Storm	6
683	Chris McKenna	2000	Cronulla-Sutherland Sharks	2
684	Jason Croker	2000	Canberra Raiders	5
685	Adam MacDougall	2000	Newcastle Knights	12
686	Trent Barrett	2000	St. George Illawarra Dragons	13
687	Nathan Hindmarsh	2000	Parramatta Eels	20
688	Ben Kennedy	2000	Newcastle Knights	16
689	Danny Buderus	2001	Newcastle Knights	25
690	Dane Carlaw	2001	Brisbane Broncos	6
691	Petero Civoniceva	2001	Brisbane Broncos	40
692	Brad Meyers	2001	Brisbane Broncos	4
693	Lote Tuqiri	2001	Brisbane Broncos	9
694	Braith Anasta	2001	Bulldogs	4
695	Nathan Blacklock	2001	St. George Illawarra Dragons	2
696	Mark Gasnier	2001	St. George Illawarra Dragons	15
697	Jamie Lyon	2001	Parramatta Eels	7
698	Jason Ryles	2001	St. George Illawarra Dragons	12
699	Willie Mason	2002	Bulldogs	25
700	Steve Simpson	2002	Newcastle Knights	7
701	Timana Tahu	2002	Newcastle Knights	5
702	Brent Tate	2002	Brisbane Broncos	26
703	Hazem El Masri	2002	Bulldogs	1
704	Craig Fitzgibbon	2002	Sydney Roosters	19
705	Craig Wing	2002	Sydney Roosters	16
706	Luke Bailey	2003	St. George Illawarra Dragons	4
707	Shannon Hegarty	2003	Sydney Roosters	3
708	Anthony Minichiello	2003	Sydney Roosters	18
709	Luke Ricketson	2003	Sydney Roosters	5
710	Phil Bailey	2003	Cronulla-Sutherland Sharks	3
711	Michael De Vere	2003	Brisbane Broncos	4
712	Richard Villasanti	2003	New Zealand Warriors	1
713	Joel Clinton	2003	Penrith Panthers	1
714	Michael Crocker	2003	Sydney Roosters	6
715	Luke Lewis	2003	Penrith Panthers	16
716	Trent Waterhouse	2003	Penrith Panthers	11
717	Shaun Berrigan	2004	Brisbane Broncos	13
718	Matt Bowen	2004	North Queensland Cowboys	1
719	Tonie Carroll	2004	Brisbane Broncos	7
720	Matt Cooper	2004	St. George Illawarra Dragons	7
721	Mark O'Meley	2004	Bulldogs	15
722	Luke Rooney	2004	Penrith Panthers	6
723	Andrew Ryan	2004	Bulldogs	11
724	Willie Tonga	2004	Bulldogs	12
725	Luke Priddis	2005	Penrith Panthers	1^{d}
726	Ben Creagh	2005	St. George Illawarra Dragons	2
727	Matt King	2005	Melbourne Storm	10
728	Luke O'Donnell	2005	North Queensland Cowboys	11
729	Scott Prince	2005	Wests Tigers	4
730	Eric Grothe Jr.	2005	Parramatta Eels	1
731	Johnathan Thurston	2006	North Queensland Cowboys	38
732	Karmichael Hunt	2006	Brisbane Broncos	11
733	Brent Kite	2006	Manly-Warringah Sea Eagles	14
734	Jarryd Hayne	2006	Parramatta Eels	14
735	Justin Hodges	2006	Brisbane Broncos	13
736	Ben Hornby	2006	St. George Illawarra Dragons	1
737	Greg Inglis	2006	Melbourne Storm	39
738	Cameron Smith	2006	Melbourne Storm	56
739	Sam Thaiday	2006	Brisbane Broncos	32
740	Anthony Tupou	2006	Sydney Roosters	11
741	Reni Maitua	2006	Bulldogs	1
742	Antonio Kaufusi	2006	Melbourne Storm	1
743	Greg Bird	2007	Cronulla-Sutherland Sharks	17
744	Cooper Cronk	2007	Melbourne Storm	38
745	Israel Folau	2007	Melbourne Storm	8
746	Dallas Johnson	2007	Melbourne Storm	1
747	Kurt Gidley	2007	Newcastle Knights	11
748	Ryan Hoffman	2007	Melbourne Storm	6
749	Brett Stewart	2007	Manly-Warringah Sea Eagles	1
750	Paul Gallen	2008	Cronulla-Sutherland Sharks	32
751	Billy Slater	2008	Melbourne Storm	30
752	Carl Webb	2008	North Queensland Cowboys	1
753	Terry Campese	2008	Canberra Raiders	1
754	Anthony Laffranchi	2008	Gold Coast Titans	5
755	Joel Monaghan	2008	Canberra Raiders	5
756	Josh Perry	2008	Manly-Warringah Sea Eagles	4
757	Glenn Stewart	2008	Manly-Warringah Sea Eagles	5
758	Anthony Watmough	2008	Manly-Warringah Sea Eagles	15
759	David Williams	2008	Manly-Warringah Sea Eagles	2
760	Darius Boyd	2008	Brisbane Broncos	23
761	Robbie Farah	2009	Wests Tigers	3
762	Ben Hannant	2009	Bulldogs	6
763	Michael Jennings	2009	Penrith Panthers	7
764	Brett Morris	2009	St. George Illawarra Dragons	18
765	Josh Morris	2009	Bulldogs	6
766	David Shillington	2009	Canberra Raiders	14
767	Brett White	2009	Melbourne Storm	3
768	Michael Weyman	2010	St. George Illawarra Dragons	1
769	Nate Myles	2010	Sydney Roosters	9
770	Tom Learoyd-Lahrs	2010	Canberra Raiders	4
771	Chris Lawrence	2010	Wests Tigers	6
772	Todd Carney	2010	Sydney Roosters	1
773	Matthew Scott	2010	North Queensland Cowboys	22
774	Dean Young	2010	St. George Illawarra Dragons	1
775	Jharal Yow Yeh	2011	Brisbane Broncos	3
776	Jamal Idris	2011	Canterbury-Bankstown Bulldogs	1
777	Kade Snowden	2011	Cronulla-Sutherland Sharks	1
778	Akuila Uate	2011	Newcastle Knights	5
779	Keith Galloway	2011	Wests Tigers	5
780	Tony Williams	2011	Manly-Warringah Sea Eagles	5
781	Daly Cherry-Evans	2011	Manly-Warringah Sea Eagles	14
782	Corey Parker	2011	Brisbane Broncos	13
783	Beau Scott	2011	St. George Illawarra Dragons	3
784	James Tamou	2012	North Queensland Cowboys	12
785	Dave Taylor	2012	South Sydney Rabbitohs	1
786	Andrew Fifita	2013	Cronulla Sharks	7
787	Boyd Cordner	2013	Sydney Roosters	20
788	Josh Papali'i	2013	Canberra Raiders	11
789	Matt Gillett	2014	Brisbane Broncos	12
790	Josh Mansour	2014	Penrith Panthers	7
791	Daniel Tupou	2014	Sydney Roosters	1
792	Dylan Walker	2014	South Sydney Rabbitohs	4
793	Aaron Woods	2014	Wests Tigers	18
794	Aidan Guerra	2014	Sydney Roosters	1
795	Sione Mata'utia	2014	Newcastle Knights	3
796	Ben Hunt	2014	Brisbane Broncos	7
797	David Klemmer	2014	Canterbury Bulldogs	18
798	Josh Jackson	2014	Canterbury Bulldogs	2
799	Arthur Conlin	1909	South Sydney Rabbitohs	2
800	Will Chambers	2015	Melbourne Storm	7
801	Josh Dugan	2015	St George Illawarra Dragons	12
802	Alex Johnston	2015	South Sydney Rabbitohs	1
803	Trent Merrin	2015	St George Illawarra Dragons	7
804	Blake Ferguson	2016	Sydney Roosters	7
805	Semi Radradra	2016	Parramatta Eels	1
806	Josh McGuire	2016	Brisbane Broncos	8
807	Michael Morgan	2016	North Queensland Cowboys	12
808	Shannon Boyd	2016	Canberra Raiders	5
809	Valentine Holmes	2016	Cronulla Sharks	x
810	Tyson Frizell	2016	St. George Illawarra Dragons	x
811	James Maloney	2016	Cronulla Sharks	3
812	Matt Moylan	2016	Penrith Panthers	1
813	Justin O'Neill	2016	North Queensland Cowboys	2
814	Jake Trbojevic	2016	Manly-Warringah Sea Eagles	7
815	Jake Friend	2016	Sydney Roosters	1
816	Dane Gagai	2017	Newcastle Knights	8
817	Wade Graham	2017	Cronulla Sharks	8
818	Jordan McLean	2017	Melbourne Storm	8
819	Reagan Campbell-Gillard	2017	Penrith Panthers	5
820	Tom Trbojevic	2017	Manly-Warringah Sea Eagles	12
821	Felise Kaufusi	2017	Melbourne Storm	4
822	Cameron Munster	2017	Melbourne Storm	19
823	Damien Cook	2018	South Sydney Rabbitohs	4
824	Luke Keary	2018	Sydney Roosters	2
825	Latrell Mitchell	2018	Sydney Roosters	10
826	James Tedesco	2018	Sydney Roosters	15
827	Josh Addo-Carr	2019	Melbourne Storm	10
828	Jack Wighton	2019	Canberra Raiders	7
829	Nick Cotric	2019	Canberra Raiders	2
830	Payne Haas	2019	Brisbane Broncos	4
831	Paul Vaughan	2019	St George Illawarra Dragons	2
832	Cameron Murray	2019	South Sydney Rabbitohs	14
833	Angus Crichton	2022	Sydney Roosters	11
834	Tino Fa'asuamaleaui	2022	Gold Coast Titans	15
835	Jeremiah Nanai	2022	North Queensland Cowboys	2
836	Murray Taulagi	2022	North Queensland Cowboys	2
837	Patrick Carrigan	2022	Brisbane Broncos	19
838	Reuben Cotter	2022	North Queensland Cowboys	16
839	Harry Grant	2022	Melbourne Storm	18
840	Matt Burton	2022	Canterbury Bankstown Bulldogs	5
841	Nathan Cleary	2022	Penrith Panthers	8
842	Campbell Graham	2022	South Sydney Rabbitohs	2
843	Liam Martin	2022	Penrith Panthers	9
844	Isaah Yeo	2022	Penrith Panthers	17
845	Lindsay Collins	2022	Sydney Roosters	12
846	Selwyn Cobbo	2023	Brisbane Broncos	1
847	Dylan Edwards	2023	Penrith Panthers	6
848	Kotoni Staggs	2023	Brisbane Broncos	11
849	Hamiso Tabuai-Fidow	2023	Dolphins	6
850	Thomas Flegler	2023	Dolphins	1
851	Nicho Hynes	2023	Cronulla Sutherland Sharks	2
856	Mitchell Barnett	2024	New Zealand Warriors	3
852	Xavier Coates	2024	Melbourne Storm	3
853	Tom Dearden	2024	North Queensland Cowboys	11
854	Zac Lomax	2024	St George Illawarra Dragons	3
855	Mitchell Moses	2024	Parramatta Eels	4
857	Hudson Young	2024	Canberra Raiders	6
858	Lindsay Smith	2024	Penrith Panthers	4
859	Mark Nawaqanitawase	2025	Sydney Roosters	3
860	Gehamat Shibasaki	2025	Brisbane Broncos	3
861	Reece Walsh	2025	Brisbane Broncos	7
862	Keaon Koloamatangi	2025	South Sydney Rabbitohs	8
863	Jack Bostock	2026	Dolphins	5
864	Jacob Preston	2026	Canterbury Bankstown Bulldogs	5
865	Bradman Best	2026	Newcastle Knights	4
866	Blayke Brailey	2026	Cronulla Sutherland Sharks	1
867	David Fifita	2026	South Sydney Rabbitohs	1
868	Sam Walker	2026	Sydney Roosters	1
869	Ethan Strange	2026	Canberra Raiders	2

== Super League representatives ==
During the split season of 1997, the Australian Super League organisation held internationals with New Zealand and Great Britain. These are considered bona fide test matches by the British Rugby Football League, the New Zealand Rugby League and Rugby League International Federation but are excluded from the Australian Rugby League's records.

No.	Name	Club	Matches
	Matt Adamson	Penrith Panthers	5
	Bradley Clyde*	Canberra Raiders	2
	Laurie Daley*	Canberra Raiders	5
	Andrew Ettingshausen*	Cronulla-Sutherland Sharks	4
	David Furner*	Canberra Raiders	1
	Ryan Girdler*	Penrith Panthers	3
	Craig Gower*	Penrith Panthers	5
	Paul Green	Cronulla-Sutherland Sharks	2
	Craig Greenhill	Cronulla-Sutherland Sharks	3
	Solomon Haumono	Canterbury Bulldogs	1
	Rodney Howe*	Perth Reds	1
	Robbie Kearns*	Perth Reds	1
	Brett Kimmorley*	Hunter Mariners	2
	Allan Langer*	Brisbane Broncos	1
	Glenn Lazarus*	Brisbane Broncos	1
	Darren Lockyer*	Brisbane Broncos	4
	Brett Mullins*	Canberra Raiders	3
	Ken Nagas	Canberra Raiders	5
	Julian O'Neill	Perth Reds	1
	David Peachey	Cronulla-Sutherland Sharks	1
	Luke Priddis*	Canberra Raiders	1
	Steve Renouf*	Brisbane Broncos	1
	Russell Richardson*	Cronulla-Sutherland Sharks	2
	Wendell Sailor*	Brisbane Broncos	5
	Darren Smith*	Brisbane Broncos	5
	Jason Stevens*	Cronulla-Sutherland Sharks	4
	Gorden Tallis*	Brisbane Broncos	3
	Brad Thorn*	Brisbane Broncos	5
	Steve Walters*	North Queensland Cowboys	3
	Shane Webcke*	Brisbane Broncos	1

- Also played for The Australian Kangaroos.

== See also ==
- Australian rugby league's 100 greatest players
- Australian rugby league's team of the century
- List of Australian Jillaroos team players

== Sources ==
- Andrews, Malcolm (2006) The ABC of Rugby League, Austn Broadcasting Corpn, Sydney
- Whiticker, Alan & Hudson, Glen (2006) The Encyclopedia of Rugby League Players, Gavin Allen Publishing, Sydney
- Australia - Players at rugbyleagueproject.com
- Middleton, David Rugby League Yearbook 1987-88 (1988), Lester Townsend Publishing Sydney
- Australian Rugby League. "Australian Players Register" (PDF). Australian Rugby League - Annual Report 2005. secure.ausport.gov.au. Archived from the original (PDF) on 5 July 2009.
