= 1908 Interstate rugby league series =

The 1908 Interstate rugby league series was the first series of matches between the then newly formed New South Wales and Queensland rugby league football teams. In what was rugby league in Australia's first year, three matches were played in July and all were won by New South Wales. These matches began the tradition of annual series between New South Wales and Queensland that would go on to form the basis of the State of Origin series.

Following the success of the 1907–08 All Golds tour, the Queensland rugby league team went on to arrange three games against New South Wales at the Sydney Agricultural Ground. Although remaining winless, thrashed 43-0 and 37-8 in the first two games, the tight 12-3 result in the third match gave Queensland its first-ever rugby league stars, with Mick Bolewski, Bill Hardcastle, Bill Heidke and Jack Fihelly all being selected for the first-ever Kangaroo tour to England.

== Game 1 ==
Still some months away from having their own competition, Queensland traveled to Sydney to play rugby league football against New South Wales for the first time.

Saturday, 11 July
3:15 PM (local time)

| Queensland | 0 - 43 | New South Wales |
|---|---|---|
| | Report | 9 Tries; Anderson (4), McCabe (2), Butler, Cann, Deane; 8 Goals; Messenger |

Royal Agricultural Society Showground, Sydney
Attendance: 5,000
Referee: Fred Henlen

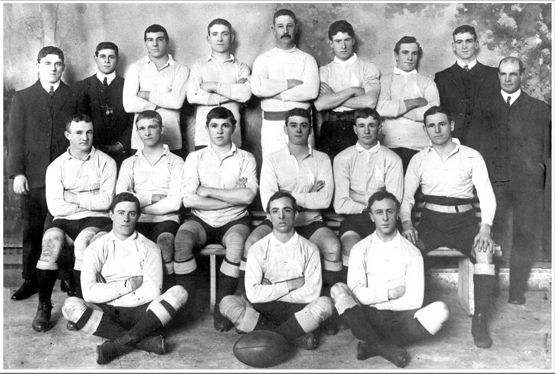
The NSW team for the inaugural interstate match.

Queensland: 1. E Baird, 2. W Abrahams, 3. W Heidke, 4. M Bolewski, 5. A O'Brien, 6. O Olsen, 7. M Dore (c), 8. W Hardcastle, 9. J Fihelly, 10. V Anderson, 11. R Tubman, 12. E Cartmill, 13. J Thompson

New South Wales: 1. C Hedley, 2. F Cheadle, 3. H Mssenger, 4. A Morton, 5. T Anderson, 6. S Deane, 7. A Butler, 8. L O'Malley, 9. W Cann, 10. T McCabe, 11. L Jones, 12. R Graves, 13. A Hennessy (c)

With the likes of the great Dally Messenger, Billy Cann, Jersey O'Malley and skipper Arthur Hennessy in their ranks the Blues represented the cream of the newly established NSWRFL, whilst Queensland had done well to assemble a team as they had not yet established a club competition. It was no surprise, then, that NSW proved far superior in this inaugural meeting, with South Sydney winger Tommy Anderson posting four tries as the Blues raced to a 43-0 win.

== Game 2 ==
New South Wales selected a completely new team for the second match. This is regarded as an exhibition match and is not included in official interstate rugby league totals.

Wednesday, 15 July
3:15 PM (local time)

| Queensland | 8 - 37 | New South Wales |
|---|---|---|
| 2 Tries; O'Brien, Thompson; 1 Goal; Evans | Report | 7 Tries; Broomham (2), Frawley (2), Moir (2), Brackenreg; 7 Goals; Brackenreg (6), Bloomfield (1); 1 Field goal Lance Hansen |

Royal Agricultural Society Showground, Sydney
Attendance: 2,000
Referee: Charlie Hutchison

Queensland: 1. M Bolewski, 2. A O'Brien, 3. W Evans, 4. O Olsen, 5. W Abrahams, 6. E Anlezark, 7. M Dore (c), 8. J Fihelly, 9. V Anderson, 10. W Hardcastle, 11. P Dwyer, 12. E Cartmill, 13. J Thompson

New South Wales: 1. H Bloomfield, 2. A Broomham, 3. E Fry, 4. A Conlon (c), 5. D Frawley, 6. J Leveson, 7. L Hansen, 8. E Courtney, 9. J Abercrombie, 10. S Carpenter, 11. V Harris, 12. P Moir, 13. H Brackenreg

== Game 3 ==
Saturday, 18 July
2:00 PM (local time)

| Queensland | 3 - 12 | New South Wales |
|---|---|---|
| 1 Try; Olsen | Report | 2 Tries; Hansen, Moir; 2 Goals; Brackenreg; 1 Field goal Hansen |

Royal Agricultural Society Showground, Sydney
Attendance: ≈ 6,000
Referee: Tom McMahon

Queensland: 1. M Bolewski, 2. W Abrahams, 3. A O'Brien, 4. W Evans, 5. O Olsen, 6. J Baird, 7. W Heidke (c), 8. J Fihelly, 9. V Anderson, 10. R Tubman, 11. E Cartmill, 12. J Thompson, 13. P Walsh

New South Wales: 1. H Bloomfield, 2. A Broomham, 3. E Fry, 4. A Conlon (c), 5. B McCarthy, 6. J Leveson, 7. L Hansen, 8. H Glanville, 9. H Brackenreg, 10. L Jones, 11. P Moir, 12. D Green, 13. E Courtney

The last game of the series was played on a slippery Royal Agricultural Ground before approximately 6,000. In what was described as a fast match, New South Wales led 5-3 at half time, keeping the Queenslanders out eventually winning 12-3.
