= 1910 Queensland Rugby League season =

- League: Queensland Amateur Rugby League
- Teams: 6
- Premiers: Ipswich
- Runners-up: Toombul
- New teams: East Brisbane; Ipswich

Junior Premiership First Grade
- Premiers: North Brisbane
- Runners-up: St. Bridget's

Junior Premiership Second Grade
- Premiers: South Brisbane
- Runners-up: North Brisbane

“The Queensland Amateur Rugby League set the air-filled sphere rolling”, opening the competition rounds on 14 May. Three grade competitions were conducted in Brisbane. Ipswich entered a representative team to play the five Brisbane senior teams and also began their own club competition. Club-level rugby league was also played in Maryborough.

Queensland hosted tours from England and New South Wales and representative matches were also arranged between towns where rugby league was growing.

== Season summary ==
=== Senior Grade ===
Six teams competed for the QARL Senior premiership and Francis Cup. East Brisbane and Ipswich joined North Brisbane, South Brisbane, Toombul and Valley.

Two round robins of matches were played. After the first round of five matches each, Toombul led. At the completion of the second round, Ipswich were ahead on points. Under the competition rules, Toombul were allowed to challenge Ipswich in a final. No semi-finals were held this year, which is especially unusual as Toombul, Norths, and Valleys all finished on 10 competition points. When the final was drawn 10 all, a second match was required.

The first final was played at the Exhibition Ground on 3 September. Attired in their red, white and blue uniforms, Toombul scored two tries, converting one, and kicked a penalty to lead 10 to nil at “lemon time” (half-time). Ipswich, in green jerseys, came back, scoring two converted tries during the second half to level the scores. In the closing stages, “The Ipswichians were playing all over Toombul now, but the latter team defended well, and full time came without further score.”

The second final was played at the Brisbane Cricket Ground, Woolloongabba on 10 September. The first half was again close, Ipswich leading two-nil at the break. Ipswich had the better of the second half, and finished the match with a final score of 17-2, winning the Francis Cup.

==== Club colours ====
East Brisbane played in blue and white; Ipswich in myrtle green; North Brisbane in red and black; South Brisbane in sky blue, Toombul in red, white and blue and Valley in navy blue.

=== Junior Grades ===
Two junior competitions were held, First Grade and Second Grade. Participating teams included Kelvin Grove Gordons, Milton, North Brisbane (3), St Bridget's (2), South Brisbane, Valley and Woodville.

In First Grade, St. Bridget’s defeated North Brisbane, 8 to 6, in a final played at Woolloongabba on 17 September. North Brisbane, “by virtue of having the greatest number of competition points, hold the right to challenge.” This they did, and won a second final, 8 to 3, at Kedron Park on the 24th, to win the premiership.

Two finals were also required in Second Grade, with both played as curtain-raisers to the senior finals. After losing to North Brisbane, leading team South Brisbane, challenged and won, 22 to nil, to claim the premiership.

=== Ipswich ===
In addition to entering a team in the QARL senior competition, the Ipswich & West Moreton Amateur Rugby League commenced local club competitions. The five teams in the senior competition were Belvideres, Blackstone, Seekers, Starlights and St. Paul's. The eight teams in the junior competition were Belvideres, Blackstone, C.Y.M. Society, Seekers, Silkstone, Starlights A and Starlights B.

In a final held at the North Ipswich Cricket Reserve on 24 September, Starlights defeated Belvideres to claim the senior premiership trophy, the Connell Cup. Belvideres were junior premiers.

=== Maryborough ===
Rugby League competitions were held in Maryborough. Four teams entered the senior competition: Glebe, Howard, Natives and Wallaroos. Glebe won the premiership, and subsequently played a benefit match against the local Rugby Union premiers. Three teams entered the junior competition: Cities, Glebe and Wallaroos.

The Maryborough Rugby League organised a "Country Week" event on 11 June, when teams from Gympie and Isis (Childers) were invited to play against Maryborough teams. On Sunday 24 July Maryborough Rugby League arranged a return train trip to Childers where three matches were to be played.

== Representative Season ==
=== England ===
The 1910 Great Britain Lions tour saw a representative team from England's Northern Rugby Football Union tour Australia and New Zealand. They played three matches in Queensland, all at the Exhibition Ground in Brisbane. The first of two Test Matches between Australia and England was played in Sydney on 18 June. Before a crowd in excess of 40,000, Australia led 12-11 at half-time, but England finished stronger to win 27-20. Queensland’s only representative in the match, Charlie Woodhead, scored a late try, “by a magnificent piece of play.”

England travelled to Queensland for matches on 25 and 29 June, however between these fixtures, on 27 June, England also played the Kangaroos in Sydney. Nine of the touring party played against the Kangaroos and in one of the matches against Queensland. Billy Batten played all three, with long trips on the “mail train” in between. Note, the Kangaroos team was composed of members of the team that toured England in 1908-09.

England defeated Queensland in both matches, by 33 to 9 on Saturday 25th and by 15 to 4 on Wednesday 29th. Through a penalty goal, Queensland briefly led in the first match, but their only try came after five tries by England. Evan Lewis made a break to send Sid Fenely to the tryline, “where he grounded the leather with several burly Britishers going hard for his scalp.”

The Second Test Match between Australia and England was played at the Exhibition Ground on 2 July. The pleasant weather and presence of seven Queenslanders in this Australian side perhaps contributed to an attendance of more than 18,000. The Brisbane Concert Band played during intervals and, “The ladies were present in large numbers, and their variegated gownings gave a very picturesque charm to the surroundings”.

Australia scored three tries, converting only the third, to lead 11 to nil. England responded with two converted tries to trail by a point at half-time. The second stanza saw six tries scored but none converted. The “British Lions” put on four tries to lead 22-11. Australia then scored twice to trail by five. The Queensland Times reported, the “last quarter of an hour furnished probably one of the most exciting bouts of football that have ever been witnessed in a Brisbane arena. The Australians fought superbly to try to equalise matters. Indeed, they were within an ace of scoring on several occasions, with the vast crowd yelling most furiously "Go on, Aus–tralia!" ”. Full-time: England 22, Australia 17.

Returning to Sydney, England next played two matches against Australasia, a composite of Australian and New Zealand players. The first match, on 9 July, was a 13-all draw and Australasia won the second, on 13 July, by 32 points to 15. Herbert Brackenreg was the sole Queensland representative in these matches.

=== New South Wales ===
New South Wales brought senior and junior teams to tour Queensland in late July and early August. Queensland lost all three senior matches, 21-40 on 30 July, 18-32 on 3 August and 3-19 on 6 August.

Queensland started the series well, scoring the second, third and sixth tries of the opening match at the ‘Gabba to lead 8-3 and later level at 11-all. The Queensland Times reported that a crowd of 8,000 greeted the local team’s tries by “cheering vociferously” and providing “tumultuous applause”.

New South Wales added two more tries to lead 19-11 at half time but Queensland scored a penalty and two tries early in the second half to reclaim the lead, 21-19. New South Wales, however, finished much the stronger to win. In the second and third matches, New South Wales led by 12 and 13 and half time and had comfortable wins.

The junior New South Wales side played matches against the Queensland juniors on 30 July and 6 August, winning both. On 3 August an Ipswich Juniors representative side held them to nil-all well into the second half, before conceding 13 late points.

=== Players ===
The following players represented Queensland in the five matches played in 1910:
Vic Anderson (South Brisbane) 3 matches, Herb Brackenreg (North Brisbane) 4*, Charles Brown (Ipswich) 2, Edward Buckley (Valley) 4*, Harold Dickens (Valley) 3, George Duffin (Valley) 3, Sid Feneley / Fennelly (North Brisbane) 2, Alf Foote (Ipswich) 1, Harold Heidke (Bundaberg & North Brisbane) 3, Bill Heidke (Bundaberg) 2*, George Hooker (Valley) 4, Reginald Jarrott (North Brisbane) 1, Alfred Jones (South Brisbane) 2, Evan Lewis (Ipswich) 4, Jack Mann (Ipswich) 1, James McComb (Toombul) 1, Dugald McGregor (Valley) 3*, Phillip McGrory (North Brisbane) 3, Robert Nicholson (South Brisbane) 4*, Arthur O'Brien (Ipswich) 4, August Pioch (Maryborough) 1, George Rousell (South Brisbane) 2, Bill Thomas (Ipswich) 2, Otto Thomsen (Valley) 1, Bob Tubman (Ipswich) 4* and Charlie Woodhead (North Brisbane) 4*.
Those marked with an asterisk also played in the Brisbane Test Match. Charlie Woodhead played in both Test matches. Herbert Brackenreg played in two matches for Australasia. The player's 1910 club or district is given in parentheses. In the newspapers, Brackenreg was often listed as Brackenrigg and Feneley as Fennelly and James McComb as F. McComb.

=== Brisbane Metropolitan team visit Wide Bay ===
The Queensland Amateur Rugby League arranged for a "Metropolitan" team to visit Maryborough and Gympie in September and play matches against the local district team. Led by Bill Heidke the local team triumphed twice, beating the combined Brisbane team by 33 to 8 and 32 to 8. The Brisbane captain, Robert Nicholson, was one of three visiting players sent-off in the first match. The Truth reported, "Arthur Johnson had charge of the whistle, and the local news-sheet says of him that he had occasion to send off a couple of Brisbane players who evidently thought the referee should do just as they wished, but seemingly they were disappointed. The game at times was of the wild and woolly variety, with an occasional lurid chunk of the unprinted part of the dictionary thrown in."

== Sources ==
- Digitised newspapers at the National Library of Australia's Trove website

- The Brisbane Courier
- The Bundaberg Mail and Burnett Advertiser
- The Maryborough Chronicle, Wide Bay and Burnett Advertiser
- The Queensland Times (Ipswich)
- The Telegraph (Brisbane)
- The Truth (Brisbane)

- http://www.rugbyleagueproject.org
