= 1908 Queensland Rugby League season =

- League: Queensland Amateur Rugby League
- Duration: 16 May to 12 September

Junior Awards
- Number of teams: 6
- Silver Medal: Toombul
- Gold Medal: A. Dutton

The first season of Rugby League in Queensland saw the formation of an association in March 1908, footballers begin training in the new code by early May, and the first in a series of representative matches played on 16 May. Club football began after teams representing Queensland had played, and then only as junior matches.

== Professional Rugby ==
A catalyst for Rugby League beginning in Australia was a tour by New Zealand footballers, as professionals. In the month of August 1907, meetings of players from most Sydney Rugby Union clubs, "and others interested in the professional movement", formed the NSW Football League. Speakers at a meeting stated the League's aim to liberally cover expenses incurred by players due to injury or travel. From the players in attendance, a team was selected for matches against the New Zealand professionals on 17, 21 and 24 August.

As noted in the newspapers, the expectation was that players involved in these professional matches would be banned from returning to the amateur sport of Rugby Union and, probably from participating in other amateur sport.

In reports and published letters to newspapers, the merits and faults of Rugby Union's governing body, and the aims and play of the new code were discussed. The developments and matches in Sydney were followed in the Brisbane papers. In one short report in the Brisbane Telegraph, Dally Messenger was the one player named, amongst several, as switching to the league.

After playing for New South Wales against the New Zealanders, Messenger joined their tour of northern England. The team played matches against Northern Union clubs throughout October, November and December. In January 1908, as the first Australian Rugby League clubs were being formed in Sydney, the New Zealanders played international matches against Wales and England.

== Rugby League arrives in Brisbane ==
On 11 March speakers at the annual meeting of the South Brisbane Rugby Union Club warned of the approach of professionalism. The Brisbane Courier reported, "Mr. D. Carter made more direct and pointed remarks when he stated that efforts were being made to form at least two senior professional teams in Brisbane. The Exhibition ground had been engaged, he said, and matches arranged with New South Wales and New Zealand."

On 27 March a notice in The Telegraph stated, "Queensland Rugby Association have engaged the grounds for football practice on Wednesdays, after Monday, 4th May."

On 7 April The Telegraph reported on the formation of the Queensland Rugby Association:
"It is claimed that the Queensland Rugby Association has been formed with a view to bettering the existing conditions of footballers in Queensland. Its opponents declare that it is intended to promote professionalism, but the promoters object to the term professional."
The report also listed the "main objects" of the association:

1. To adopt the rules of the Northern Rugby Union of England, as it is contended that their game is the most attractive form of Rugby.
2. To provide for the insurance of players against accident.
3. To bring footballers into line with cricketers, so far as the Commonwealth is concerned, and also with regard to overseas undertakings.
4. To contribute to local charities a percentage of profits.

The inaugural executive committee of the Queensland Rugby Association was: Alf Faulkner (Chairman and Treasurer), Sine Boland (Secretary), J. A. O'Connor, George Watson, John Fihelly, E. L. Buchanan, and Micky J. Dore.

== Season summary ==
=== Representative matches ===
The inaugural club competition in New South Wales began in Sydney on 21 April and club matches ran in parallel to representative matches through May, June and July. The first lot of representative matches were played against the returning New Zealand team in Newcastle and Sydney.

==== New Zealand ====
Three Queensland footballers, Doug McLean, Micky Dore and Robert Tubman played for Australia against New Zealand in Sydney on 9 May. Another three Queenslanders were unavailable for selection due to work commitments.

The touring New Zealanders arrived in Brisbane on Friday 15 May, and after a reception at their hotel, went to have a look at venue for their matches. There, "The members of the team trained on the Exhibition ground, and also coached some of the Queensland team in the points of the Northern Rugby Union game."

The first formal Rugby League match in Queensland was played on 16 May between Queensland and New Zealand teams. Queensland had the honour of scoring the first points, through a try in the corner by Arthur O'Brien. New Zealand responded with two quick tries. With a further two tries by the visitors, and all goal kicks unsuccessful, the half-time score was New Zealand 12, Queensland 3. After conceding a try to Doug McLean early in the second half, New Zealand took their score to 34, before a rally by Queensland saw tries to Bill Hardcastle and George Watson. At full-time, New Zealand 34 had defeated Queensland 12.

The following days and weeks saw the New Zealand team undergo an emotional trial due to the passing of one of their leading members, Albert Baskerville. Having "caught a chill" on the ship voyage from Sydney, Baskerville entered hospital on Sunday, "suffering from pneumonia". He died on Wednesday evening, 20 May, aged 25. Baskerville had been one of a small group that organised the tour, acted as its travelling secretary and, when those duties permitted, he played as a wing three-quarter. In the Test match in Sydney on 9 May he had scored a try.

Having beaten a Brisbane team 43 to 10 earlier on the day that their teammate died, the New Zealand All Blacks were weakened by the departure of six players to accompany the body and make funeral arrangements. The remaining members continued on, keeping appointments to which, weeks earlier, Baskerville as secretary may well have consented.

All but one of the Brisbane team had played in the first match, but Queensland were now strengthened by the inclusion of Bundaberg's Bill Heidke and a guest, Dally Messenger.

Messenger opened the scoring prior with a long range penalty goal, prior to a period in which, "the play shifted from one end to the other, with amazing rapidity." New Zealand had a try disallowed but soon after equalised with a goal. A field goal shy of half-time gave the "All Blacks" the lead. Two tries early in the second stanza, one converted, extended that lead to ten points. Breaks by Mickey Dore and Messenger were stopped short of the try-line by New Zealand's scrambling defence, a penalty reducing the deficit to eight. Bill Heidke made a break down the wing and found George Watson in support. Surprisingly, Messenger missed the conversion attempt from in front of the posts, "but he made amends after kicking a penalty goal from what seemed an impossible distance and a very difficult angle." New Zealand, playing one short throughout the match, continued to attack and defend until the final minutes, when, "in the centre Messenger got possession and scored a wonderful try in the corner." His kick went astray, and the match finished as a 12-all draw.

The final game in Queensland was against Australia on the 30th. New Zealand won 24–12. This match was the second in a three match Test series. Four Queenslanders - J. Edward Baird, Micky Dore, Bill Hardcastle and George Watson - played in the Australian team.

==== New Zealand Māori ====
The New Zealand Māori team played five matches in and against Queensland. The first three were held at the Exhibition Ground in Brisbane on 27 June, 1 July and 4 July. Queensland lost the first two (16-19 and 5-13) but won the third (6-5).
In the fourth match, played in Toowoomba on 7 July, "A regrettable incident happened past within a few minutes of full time, and the game ended abruptly". After a scuffle between players, a Maori forward struck a Queensland player and he, in turn, was struck by a spectator as some of the crowd entered the field. The referee, Micky Dore, "ordered the offending player off the field, and [Māori captain] Asher resenting the action led his men off the field, followed by a "howling" mob of spectators". Holding an 11 to 9 lead, the Queensland players remained on the field until full-time.

Remarkably, the Māori team kept their commitment in Warwick the following day, 8 July, but Queensland won that match, 23 to 14.

==== Inter-state Matches ====
A Queensland team ventured to Sydney to play three matches, two against New South Wales on successive Saturdays and a mid-week match against a Sydney Metropolitan team. All were played at the Royal Agricultural Ground. With a full strength side, New South Wales won 43-nil on 11 July.

Early in the Wednesday match the visitors equalised at five-all, as "keeping their footing on treacherous ground, the Queenslanders passed beautifully, the ball going from Fihelly to Hardcastle to Thompson, who scored in the corner." At the outset of the second half, "[Arthur] O'Brien made a great run down the centre, taking long strides, and fending off four tacklers in turn he scored a splendid try in the corner." This took the score to 12–8. Sydney Metropolitan, "playing with magnificent combination" then ran away with the match to win, 37–8.

The third match was played as a curtain raiser to an Australia versus New Zealand Māori match. Queensland opened the scoring: "A great sprint by the northerners transferred the scene to the home team's territory. Some fine forward play was wound up with a try, secured by Olsen." The second string NSW side, however, won by 12 points to 3.

=== Club matches ===
The teams that appeared in newspaper reports included Milton, North Brisbane (A & B), St, Bridget's and Toombul.

On 4 July, in a curtain-raiser to the third Queensland versus Māori match, two junior teams met. Valley 10 defeated Toombul 8.

The Brisbane Courier listed the playing line-ups for a match between North Brisbane (in red and black) and Toombul (wearing red, white and blue) on 18 July and printed the result, Toombul winning by 30 points to 5, the following Monday.

The season concluded on 12 September with a match between Toombul and a Combined Thirteen. Toombul won the match, 37 to nil, and consequently, "were awarded the silver medal and their captain a gold medal, while A. Dutton wing forward of the Toombuls was awarded a gold medal for best individual player."

== Sources ==
- Digitised newspapers at the National Library of Australia's Trove website
  - Darling Downs Gazette
  - The Brisbane Courier
  - The Sunday Times (Sydney)
  - The Sydney Morning Herald
  - The Telegraph (Brisbane)
  - Truth (Brisbane)
- Rugby League Project
- Gary Lester, ed. (1985). Rugby League Action '85. Sydney, New South Wales: John Fairfax Marketing. p. 138. ISBN 0-909558-83-3.
