= Heidke =

Heidke is a surname. Notable people with the surname include:

- Bill Heidke (1883–1959), Australian rugby league player
- Les Heidke, Australian rugby league player, son of Bill
- Kate Miller-Heidke (born 1981), Australian singer-songwriter and actress
