= 1965 Kangaroo tour of New Zealand =

1965 rugby league tour

- Manager: Arnold Stehr (NSW); Des Green (Qld)
- Coach(es): Ian Walsh
- Tour captain(s): Ian Walsh
- Top point scorer(s): Les Johns 37
- Top try scorer(s): Nick Yakich 6
- Top test point scorer(s): Ken Irvine 9
- Top test try scorer(s): Ken Irvine 3
Summary
P	W	D	L
Total
8	7	0	1
Test match
2	1	0	1
Opponent
P	W	D	L
New Zealand
2	1	0	1

Tour chronology
- Previous tour: 1961 by to 1963 by to 1963-64 to
- Next tour: 1967 by to 1969 by to 1967-68 to

The 1965 Kangaroo Tour of New Zealand was a mid-season tour of New Zealand by the Australia national rugby league team. The Australians played eight matches on tour, including two tests against the New Zealand national rugby league team. The tour began on 9 June and finished on 28 June.

== Leadership ==
Ian Walsh was both the captain and the coach of the touring side. Walsh appeared in seven of the eight matches. Reg Gasnier captained the Australian team in the one match in which Walsh did not appear, against Canterbury.

The team was co-managed by Arnold Stehr (Manly, NSW) and Des Green (Ipswich, Qld).

== Touring squad ==
The Rugby League News published details of the touring team including the players' ages and weights. A team photo was published at the conclusion of the tour.
Match details - listing surnames of both teams and the point scorers - were included in E.E. Christensen's Official Rugby League Yearbook, as was a summary of the players' point-scoring.

Cavanagh, Gleeson and Wellington were selected from Queensland clubs. Beath, Buman and Pannowitz were selected from clubs in New South Wales Country areas. The balance of the squad were playing for Sydney based clubs during the 1965 season.

Player	Position	Age	Weight st.lb (kg)	Club	Tests on Tour	Games	Tries	Goals	FG	Points
Barry Beath	Prop, Second-row	20	14.8 (93)	Eugowra	0	5	2	0	0	6
Allan Buman	Hooker	24	13.0 (83)	Newcastle Western Suburbs	0	3	1	0	0	3
Noel Cavanagh	Lock	22	13.10 (87)	Brisbane Brothers	0	3	0	2	0	4
Michael Cleary	Wing	25	13.6 (85)	South Sydney	2	5	1	0	0	3
Reg Gasnier	Centre	26	12.12 (82)	St George	2	5	4	3	0	18
John Gleeson	Five-eighth, Halfback	24	12.4 (78)	Toowoomba All Whites	0	5	2	0	0	6
Brian Hambly	Lock	27	14.9 (93)	Parramatta	2	6	1	0	0	3
Ken Irvine	Wing	25	12.2 (77)	North Sydney	2	7	5	0	0	15
Les Johns	Fullback	22	11.10 (74)	Canterbury	2	7	1	17	0	37
Graeme Langlands	Centre	23	13.2 (83)	St George	2	4	1	2	0	7
Jimmy Lisle	Five-eighth	25	12.5 (78)	South Sydney	2	6	5	0	0	15
John Morgan	Second-row	21	15.7 (98)	Manly-Warringah	2	7	2	0	0	6
Terry Pannowitz	Five-eighth, Lock	20	12.9 (80)	Maitland	0	4	1	0	0	3
Paul Quinn	Prop	27	14.10 (93)	Newtown	2	5	0	0	0	0
Billy Smith	Halfback	22	11.4 (72)	St George	2	7	3	0	0	9
Mick Veivers	Second-row	26	16.2 (103)	Manly-Warringah	2	5	0	0	0	0
Ian Walsh	Prop, Hooker	30	14.2 (90)	St George	2	7	0	0	0	0
Lloyd Weier	Prop	26	16.6 (104)	North Sydney	2	7	1	0	0	3
Garry Wellington	Centre	23	12.7 (79)	Ayr	0	3	1	0	0	3
Nick Yakich	Wing	25	12.1 (77)	Manly-Warringah	0	4	6	0	0	18

== Tour ==
The Australians played eight matches on the tour, winning all of the matches except for the second test against New Zealand.

Wednesday 9 June

Wellington	16 – 34	Australia
	Report

Basin Reserve, Wellington
Attendance: 1,745

Friday 11 June

Canterbury	4 – 19	Australia
	Report

Addington Showgrounds, Christchurch
Attendance: 2,654

Sunday 13 June

West Coast	6 – 16	Australia
	Report

Wingham Park, Greymouth
Attendance: 1,682

Tuesday 15 June

Taranaki	11 – 29	Australia
	Report

Pukekura Park, New Plymouth
Attendance: 900

=== First test ===
Saturday 19 June

New Zealand	8 – 13	Australia
Tries: Goals: Jack Fagan (2/2); Graham Kennedy (2/2)		Tries: Ken Irvine (2); Lloyd Weier; Goals: Les Johns (2/3)

Carlaw Park, Auckland
Attendance: 13,205
Referee: John Pervical (New Zealand)

New Zealand

FB	1	Jack Fagan
RW	2	Roy Christian
CE	3	Roger Bailey
CE	4	Paul Schultz
LW	5	Brian Langton
FE	6	Doug Ellwood
HB	7	Bill Snowden (c)
PR	8	Robin Scholefield
HK	9	Colin O'Neil
PR	10	Maunga Emery
SR	11	Eddie Moore
SR	12	Don Hammond
LF	13	Ray Sinel
BE	14	Graham Kennedy
Coach:
(New Zealand) Maurie Robertson

Australia

FB	1	Les Johns
RW	2	Michael Cleary
CE	3	Reg Gasnier
CE	4	Graeme Langlands
LW	5	Ken Irvine
FE	6	Jimmy Lisle
HB	7	Billy Smith
PR	8	Paul Quinn
HK	9	Ian Walsh (c)
PR	10	Lloyd Weier
SR	11	Mick Veivers
SR	12	John Morgan
LF	13	Brian Hambly
Coach:
(Australia) Ian Walsh

Wednesday 23 June

Waikato	4 – 25	Australia
	Report

Davies Park, Huntly
Attendance: 1,800

=== Second test ===
Saturday 26 June

New Zealand	7 – 5	Australia
Tries: Roger Bailey; Goals: Jack Fagan (2/2)		Tries: Ken Irvine; Goals: Les Johns (1/1)

Carlaw Park, Auckland
Attendance: 11,383
Referee: John Percival (New Zealand)

New Zealand

FB	1	Jack Fagan
RW	2	Roy Christian
CE	3	Roger Bailey
CE	4	Graham Kennedy
LW	5	Brian Langton
FE	6	Paul Schultz
HB	7	Bill Snowden (c)
PR	8	Sam Edwards
HK	9	Colin O'Neil
PR	10	Maunga Emery
SR	11	Kevin Dixon
SR	12	Don Hammond
LF	13	Ray Sinel
Coach:
(New Zealand) Maurie Robertson

Australia

FB	1	Les Johns
RW	2	Michael Cleary
CE	3	Reg Gasnier
CE	4	Graeme Langlands
LW	5	Ken Irvine
FE	6	Jimmy Lisle
HB	7	Billy Smith
PR	8	Lloyd Weier
HK	9	Ian Walsh (c)
PR	10	Paul Quinn
SR	11	John Morgan
SR	12	Mick Veivers
LF	13	Brian Hambly
Coach:
(Australia) Ian Walsh

Monday 28 June

Auckland	2 – 18	Australia
	Report

Carlaw Park, Auckland
Attendance: 7,000
