= 1909 Queensland Rugby League season =

- League: Queensland Amateur Rugby League
- Duration: May 8 to September 4
- Teams: 4
- Matches played: 15
- Points scored: 268
- Premiers: Valley (1st title)
- Runners-up: South Brisbane

Junior Premiership
- Number of teams: 6
- Premiers: St. Bridget's
- Runner's Up: North Brisbane

The 1909 Queensland Rugby League season was the inaugural season of rugby league football club competition in Brisbane, Queensland, Australia. Club matches had begun in July 1908 and encouraged by a small profit, the Queensland Amateur Rugby League looked to establish club competitions.

In April 1909, Valley, who had played matches in 1908, held a meeting to, "start a senior Valley Club to play under the Northern Union [Rugby League] rules".

== Season summary ==
The structure for competitive club Rugby League in Brisbane appears to be modelled on how Rugby Union was organised in the city at the time. Rugby Union in 1909 had Senior and Junior divisions, with multiple grades in each.

=== Senior Competition ===
Four teams entered the senior Rugby League competition: North Brisbane, South Brisbane, Toombul and Valley. Practice matches were arranged for May 1, with the competition to begin the following Saturday.

The first senior club competition matches in Brisbane were played on Saturday, May 8, 1909. Both matches were played at the Brisbane Cricket Ground, Woolloongabba. In the first match played, North Brisbane 8 defeated Toombul nil. In the match that followed, South Brisbane 12 defeated Valley 2.

Sharing the season calendar with representative fixtures, club senior competition matches were played on eight Saturdays across five months - May 8, 15, 22, 29, July 3, 10 24 (Semi-Finals) and September 4 (Final). As all Senior results were published in the newspapers (The Telegraph, The Brisbane Courier and Truth) it is possible to reconstruct a competition table.

Team	Pld	W	D	L	PF	PA	PD	Pts
Valley	6	4	1	1	62	34	+28	9
South Brisbane	6	3	0	3	54	39	+15	6
North Brisbane	6	2	1	3	40	47	-7	5
Toombul	6	2	0	4	27	63	-36	4

All four teams played in semi-finals. It is possible that the QARL was using a similar approach that the NSWRFL was using at the time. Namely, two points for a win in a semi-final or final were added to the team's tally. A challenger would have to pass on competition points the team they challenged. This may be the reason that while North Brisbane challenged South Brisbane for a place in the final, Valley played Toombul to give them an opportunity to secure a further two points.

In the semi-finals South Brisbane 21 defeated North Brisbane 11 and Valley 30 defeated Toombul 0.

The Final of the competition was held on Saturday, September 4 at the Brisbane Cricket Ground, Woolloongabba. South Brisbane opened the scoring with a penalty before Valley responded with a converted try. Following a second penalty to South Brisbane, Valley led 5 to 4 at the half-time break. Valley increased their lead in the second half, scoring four tries, converting one. South Brisbane did not add to their score. Full-time: Valley 19 defeated South Brisbane 4.

=== Junior Competition ===
Junior division teams included Milton, North Brisbane, South Brisbane, St Bridget's, Toombul, Valley.

St Bridget's won the junior premiership with North Brisbane juniors the runner's up.

Contemporary newspaper reports refer to St Bridget's Church and Convent Grounds at Red Hill, suggesting that the team was linked to the church now known as St Bridid's. St Bridget's also had a cricket team, playing in the 1909-10 Fourth Grade Junior competition.

== Sources ==
- Digitised newspapers at the National Library of Australia's Trove website
- The Brisbane Courier
- The Telegraph (Brisbane)
- The Truth (Brisbane)
