= Mick Bolewski =

Australia international rugby league footballer

Personal information
- Full name: Michael Patrick Bolewski
- Born: 19 September 1888 Ballina, New South Wales, Australia
- Died: 18 May 1974 (aged 85) Sydney, New South Wales, Australia

Playing information

Rugby union
Club
Years	Team	Pld	T	G	FG	P
	?
Representative
Years	Team	Pld	T	G	FG	P
	Country Queensland

Rugby league
- Position: Fullback, Wing, Centre
Club
Years	Team	Pld	T	G	FG	P
190?–08	Bundaberg
1909/10–11/12	Leigh	100	3	18	0	45
	Total	100	3	18	0	45
Representative
Years	Team	Pld	T	G	FG	P
1908–??	Queensland	7	0	0	0	0
1908–09	Australia	4	10	0	0	3
	Lancashire
- Relatives: Alex Bolewski (brother); Henry Bolewski (brother)

Michael Patrick Bolewski (/ˈbəluːski/; 1888–1974) was a pioneering Australian international representative rugby league footballer who played in the 1900s and 1910s. He, along with his three brothers, Henry, Alec and Walter, became a pioneering Queensland representative player as well.

From a Polish family, Bolewski was playing rugby union in 1908 when selected to play for Country Queensland in their victory against Metropolitan Brisbane. Bolewski was then included in the first Queensland rugby league team formed to play against New South Wales, travelling down to Sydney for all three of the first series of interstate rugby league matches in Australia. He was then selected to go on the 1908–09 Kangaroo tour of Great Britain, the first ever such tour, and with teammate Bill Heidke became the first Bundaberg locals to represent Australia. Bolewski played in all three matches of the first Ashes series for Australia against Great Britain. He stayed in England after the tour to play for Leigh. In 1909 Bolewski started a three-season stint with the club. Also that year he played for Australia when they hosted the visiting New Zealand national rugby league team. Bolweski became the first overseas player to play 100 games for Leigh and reappeared in their A team after several seasons' break.

In 2008, the centenary year of rugby league in Australia, Bolewski was named at fullback in a Bundaberg rugby league team of the century.
