= Ted McGuinness =

Australian rugby league footballer

Personal information
- Full name: Edward McGuinness

Playing information
- Position: Centre, Five-eighth
Club
Years	Team	Pld	T	G	FG	P
1908–09	Newcastle	20	7	2	1	27
1910	Balmain	1	0	0	0	0
1912	Glebe	1	0	0	0	0
1915–20	Annandale	23	0	0	0	0
	Total	45	7	2	1	27
Representative
Years	Team	Pld	T	G	FG	P
1910	New South Wales	2	2	1	0	8
1911	NSW Country	1	0	0	0	0
- Source: As of 24 April 2023

Ted McGuinness was an Australian former professional rugby league footballer who played in the 1900s, 1910s and 1920s. He played for Annandale, Balmain, Glebe and Newcastle in the NSWRL competition.

== Playing career ==
McGuinness made his first grade debut for the Newcastle Rebels in the opening round of the NSWRL competition in 1908. McGuinness played at centre for Newcastle in their 8–5 loss against Glebe at Wentworth Park. In round 3 of the 1908 season, McGuinness played in Newcastle's first win as they defeated Cumberland 37–0. In 1909, McGuinness played eleven games for Newcastle including their final ever game which was a semi-final against South Sydney. Newcastle would lose 20-0 and disbanded shortly afterwards.

After the demise of the Newcastle Rebels, McGuinness signed on with Balmain but only played one game. In 1912, he joined Glebe and also made a solitary appearance. In 1915, McGuinness joined the struggling Annandale team. McGuinness played in their final season in 1920 which also finished with the club not winning a single match.

McGuinness represented New South Wales twice in 1910 and also played one match for NSW Country in 1911.
