= George Duffin =

Australian rugby league player

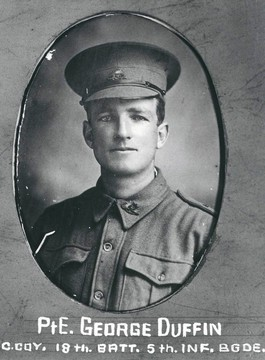

Personal information
- Full name: George William Duffin
- Born: 14 October 1887; Stanmore, NSW, Australia
- Died: 22 August 1915 (aged 27); Gallipoli, Ottoman Empire

Playing information
- Position: Fullback / Centre / Wing
Club
Years	Team	Pld	T	G	FG	P
1908	Western Suburbs	4	0	0	0	0
1909	Toombul	6	0	4	0	8
1910	Fortitude Valley	4	0	3	0	6
	Total	14	0	7	0	14
Representative
Years	Team	Pld	T	G	FG	P
1909–13	Queensland	19	0	10	0	20
1912	Australia	1	0	0	0	0

George William Duffin (14 October 1887 – 22 August 1915) was an Australian rugby league player.

== Biography ==
Raised in Sydney, Duffin attended Glebe State School and played his junior rugby for Ashfield.

Duffin, a lightly built utility back, started out with rugby union club Western Suburbs, where he had two seasons in first grade before switching codes. He has the distinction of featuring in the inaugural seasons of both the NSWRFL and QRL. After playing for the Western Suburbs Magpies in 1908, Duffin moved to Queensland, playing for Toombul and Fortitude Valley. He represented his adoptive state on 19 occasions. In 1912, Duffin made his only international appearance for Australia as a winger against the touring New Zealand team in one of two matches between the sides in Brisbane. He was awarded the captaincy of Queensland in 1913.

At the beginning of World War I, Duffin enlisted with the AIF and sailed to Egypt, where he remained for brief period before arriving on the Gallipoli Peninsula on 20 August 1915. He was one of around 1,000 men from the 18th Battalion tasked with capturing Hill 60 from the Turks on his third day at Gallipoli. While charging towards the enemy trenches, Duffin is believed to have been struck by a shell. His body was never recovered.

== See also ==
- List of Australia national rugby league team players
