= Graham Laird =

Australian rugby league player

Personal information
- Born: 1933
- Died: 9 April 1958 (aged 24)

Playing information
- Position: Five-eighth
Club
Years	Team	Pld	T	G	FG	P
1956	Parramatta Eels	17	4	9	0	30
Representative
Years	Team	Pld	T	G	FG	P
1955	Queensland	4	2	0	0	6
1956	New South Wales	1	1	0	0	3
1955	Australia	2	2	0	0	6

Graham Laird (1933 – 9 April 1958) was an Australian rugby league player.

Raised in the Mackay Region, Laird was the elder brother of Queensland and Australia fullback Ray.

Laird started out in North Queensland playing for the Magpies in the Mackay league and was the competition's "best and fairest" player in the 1954 season. In 1955, Laird switched to Toowoomba and won selection as Queensland five-eighth for the interstate series against New South Wales. This was followed by a national call up for home Tests against France and he scored two tries on debut at the Gabba. He competed for the Parramatta Eels in the 1956 NSWRFL season, then had a season with Narromine, before returning to Queensland.

In 1958, Laird was early into his first season as captain-coach of Mackay when he got crushed by an overturned tractor while farming near Ilbilbie, Queensland. Although rescued by a motorist, Laird had suffered fatal injuries, having been trapped until the tractor for several hours. He died on the way to the hospital.
