= Alex Bolewski =

Australian rugby league footballer

Personal information
- Full name: Alexander Bolewski
- Born: 19 August 1891 Ballina, New South Wales, Australia
- Died: 16 July 1981 (aged 89) Undercliffe, New South Wales, Australia

Playing information
Club
Years	Team	Pld	T	G	FG	P
1915–19	Glebe	59	13	91	0	221
1920–24	Newtown	60	6	36	0	90
	Total	119	19	127	0	311
Representative
Years	Team	Pld	T	G	FG	P
1919	New South Wales	1	0	0	0	0
- Relatives: Mick Bolewski (brother); Henry Bolewski (brother)

Alexander Bolewski (/ˈbəluːski/; 19 August 1891 – 16 July 1981) was a pioneer Australian rugby league player who played in the 1910s and 1920s.

== Background ==
Bolewski was born at Rous Mill, near Ballina, New South Wales on 19 August 1891. He was the brother of Walter Bolewski, Mick Bolewski, and his Glebe and Newtown teammate Henry Bolewski.

== Playing career ==
Alex (or Alec) Bolewski played for the Glebe Dirty Reds for four seasons between 1914 and 1919, although he missed the 1917 and 1918 seasons due to active service in World War I.

He enlisted in the AIF in 1916, and joined the 1st Light Horse Field Ambulance, 27th reinforcements. His unit was sent to Europe in 1917, and, while surviving the war, he did not return to Australia until April 1919, although he resumed his rugby league career soon afterward, playing 13 games that season.

In 1920 he moved to Newtown and he played five seasons there between 1920 and 1924, often as captain.

Bolewski represented the Metropolis (Sydney) team in 1915, and represented New South Wales on one occasion in 1919.

One of the rugby leagues great characters and pioneers, Alex Bolewski died at Undercliffe, New South Wales on 16 July 1981, aged 89.
