= Les Heidke =

Australia international rugby league footballer (1908-1978)

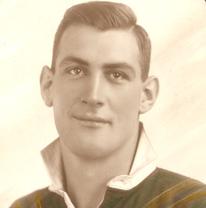
- Heidke in 1932

Personal information
- Full name: Leslie William Heidke
- Born: 22 September 1908 Queensland, Australia
- Died: 27 November 1978 (aged 70)

Playing information
- Position: Prop, Second-row
Club
Years	Team	Pld	T	G	FG	P
	Wide Bay
	Tivoli
	West End
	Rialto
	Total	0	0	0	0	0
Representative
Years	Team	Pld	T	G	FG	P
1928–41	Queensland	43
1932–46	Ipswich	53	20	0	0	60
1932–38	Australia	9	0	0	0	0
- Father: Bill Heidke

Les Heidke, also known by the nickname of "Monty", was an Australian rugby league footballer who played in the 1930s and 1940s. An Australian international and Queensland interstate representative forward, he played club football in the Ipswich Rugby League for the Tivoli, West End and Rialto clubs, as well as for Wide Bay. Heidke retired with the most games for Queensland against New South Wales in history.

Les Heidke's father was 1908 Kangaroo William Heidke and his uncle was Harold Heidke, who also played for Australia.

In 1928 Heidke first represented Queensland in the annual three-match series against New South Wales. In 1932 Heidke became Kangaroo No. 172 when, during the 1932 Great Britain Lions tour he was selected to play for Australia at second-row forward against Great Britain in the Ashes series' second and third test matches. Heidke was ruled out of the 1933–34 Kangaroo tour with a poisoned leg, caused by a bite from a red-back spider.

During the 1936 Great Britain Lions tour Heidke was selected to play as a second-row for Australia in all three Ashes tests.

Between 1932 and 1946, Heidke represented Ipswich in the Bulimba Cup a record 53 times, scoring 20 tries.

Heidke's 11-year-old son died on 7 July 1946.

In 2008, rugby league in Australia's centenary year, Heidke was named on the bench of the Bundaberg Rugby League's team of the century.
