= Terry Pannowitz =

Australian rugby league player

Personal information
- Full name: Terrence John Pannowitz
- Born: 19 September 1942 (age 82)

Playing information
- Position: Lock
Representative
Years	Team	Pld	T	G	FG	P
1965	New South Wales	1	0	0	0	0
1965	Australia

Terrence John Pannowitz (born 19 September 1942) is an Australian former rugby league player.

Pannowitz was raised in Maitland, New South Wales, where he attended Marist Brothers.

A lightly built lock, Pannowitz was a Newcastle, NSW Country, NSW and Australia representative player. He toured New Zealand in 1965 with the national team, taking the place of an injured Johnny Raper. At club level, Pannowitz was a stalwart of the Maitland Pickers, for which he made a record 270 appearances. He was the 1966 Country Player of the Year. In the 1980s, Pannowitz had stints coaching Newcastle and NSW Country Seconds.
