= Garry Wellington =

Australian rugby league player

Personal information
- Full name: Garry Charles Wellington
- Born: 25 April 1942 (age 82)

Playing information
- Position: Centre
Representative
| Years | Team | Pld | T | G | FG | P |
|---|---|---|---|---|---|---|
| 1965–66 | Queensland | 9 | 1 | 0 | 0 | 3 |
| 1965 | Australia |

Garry Charles Wellington (born 25 April 1942) is an Australian former rugby league player.

Educated at Marist Brothers Coogee, Wellington was a forward during his years in schoolboy rugby league, but possessed considerable pace and became a back after school, having reduced his weight.

Wellington, an Ayr electrician, was a surprise selection to the Australia squad for the 1965 tour of New Zealand, where played centre in minor matches. While playing for Herbert River the following year, Wellington gained his second national call up, as a non-playing reserve in their home series against Great Britain.
