= Trevor McDonald (rugby league) =

Australian rugby league footballer

Playing information
- Position: Wing
Representative
Years	Team	Pld	T	G	FG	P
1958–59	Queensland	5	3	0	0	9
1959	Australia	1	0	0	0	0

Trevor McDonald is an Australian former rugby league footballer.

A winger originally from Innisfail, McDonald was a speedy player who ran professionally and gained international honours against the touring 1959 New Zealand team, playing the opening Test match at the Sydney Cricket Ground. Australia had a narrow 9-8 win in muddy conditions not to McDonald's favour and he lost his place to Eddie Lumsden for their next fixture.

McDonald spent part of his career in Toowoomba, where he played for Newtown and Valleys.
