= Allan Buman =

Australian rugby league footballer

Personal information
- Full name: Allan Frederick Buman
- Born: 21 April 1940 (age 86) Newcastle, NSW, Australia

Playing information
- Position: Hooker
Representative
Years	Team	Pld	T	G	FG	P
1965–68	New South Wales	10	1	0	0	3
1967	Australia	2	0	0	0	0

Allan Frederick Buman (born 21 April 1940) is an Australian former rugby league footballer.

Based in Newcastle, Buman was a hooker for the Western Suburbs Rosellas and was a member of the national team during the 1960s. He participated in Australia's 1965 tour of New Zealand, without attaining a Test cap, then made two Test appearances against New Zealand at home in 1967. Overlooked for the 1967–68 tour of Great Britain and subsequent World Cup, Buman announced his retirement from representative football in 1968.

Buman served as the inaugural coach of the Newcastle University Seahorses.

In 2008, Buman was named in the Newcastle Rugby League Team of the Century.

Buman has also been involved in the sport of greyhound racing as a trainer.
