= 1997 in rugby league =

1997 in rugby league centered on the Super League II and Australasia's split season (between the competing Australian Rugby League and Super League organisations).

- March 1 at Townsville, Queensland – Adelaide Rams play their first match, a 16–24 loss to the North Queensland Cowboys at Dairy Farmers Stadium before 17,738.
- March 2 at Newcastle, New South Wales – Hunter Mariners play their first match: a 16–20 loss to the Canterbury Bulldogs at Topper Stadium before 6,579. The new club only lasts until the end of the season when it is closed.
- April 25 at Sydney, Australia – Super League's inaugural ANZAC Test match is won by Australia 34–22 against New Zealand at the Sydney Football Stadium before 23,829.
- May 3 – London, United Kingdom: In the 1997 Challenge Cup Final St. Helens defeat Bradford Bulls 32–22 at Wembley Stadium before a crowd of 78,022. St. Helens' stand off half Tommy Martyn is awarded the Lance Todd Trophy as man-of-the-match.
- May 19 at Brisbane, Australia – Super League Tri-series tournament culminates with New South Wales' 23–22 win against Queensland in the final at ANZ Stadium before 35,570. This match is notable for being the longest ever played, at 104 minutes.
- June 11 at Melbourne, Australia – The 1997 State of Origin series is wrapped up by New South Wales in game two of the three-match series against Queensland at the Melbourne Cricket Ground before 25,105.
- August 31 at Brisbane, Australia – South Queensland Crushers play their final game before folding: a 39–18 win over the Western Suburbs Magpies at Lang Park before 11,588.
- August 31 in United Kingdom – Super League II's final match is played and Bradford Bulls, who finished on top of the table, are crowned champions.
- September 20 at Brisbane, Australia – the Australasian 1997 Super League season culminates in the Brisbane Broncos' 26–8 win over the Cronulla-Sutherland Sharks in the grand final at ANZ Stadium before 58,912.
- The 1997 Rothmans Medal for player of the ARL Premiership was awarded to Sydney City Roosters captain and five-eighth, Brad Fittler.
- September 28 at Sydney, Australia – the 1997 ARL season culminates in the Newcastle Knights' 22–16 win over the Manly-Warringah Sea Eagles in the grand final at the Sydney Football Stadium before 42,482. Newcastle fullback Robbie O'Davis is awarded the Clive Churchill Medal.
- September 28 – Manchester, United Kingdom: In the 1997 Super League Premiership Final Wigan Warriors defeat St. Helens 33–20 at Old Trafford before a crowd of 33,389. The Harry Sunderland Trophy is awarded to Wigan's loose forward Andrew Farrell.
- October 17 at Auckland, New Zealand – 1997 World Club Championship tournament culminates in the Brisbane Broncos' 36–12 win over the Hunter Mariners at Mount Smart Stadium before 12,000. This was the Mariners' final match before folding at the close of the season.
- November 16 in Leeds, United Kingdom The Super League Test series is won by Australia who defeat Great Britain 20 – 37 in the third and deciding match at Elland Road before a crowd of 39,337.
- December 19 – Sydney, Australia: representatives of clubs affiliated with the Australian Rugby League gathered at the Sydney Football Stadium to decide whether to accept News Limited's offer of a settlement with the breakaway 'Super League' – eventually voting in favour by 36 votes to 4. As a result, in the following months the National Rugby League, jointly owned by the ARL and News Limited, was formed.
