= Harry Glanville =

Australian rugby league footballer

Personal information
- Full name: Henry Glanville
- Born: 31 October 1880 Redfern, New South Wales, Australia
- Died: 6 August 1959 (aged 78) Mosman, New South Wales, Australia

Playing information

Rugby union
Club
Years	Team	Pld	T	G	FG	P
19??–07	Northern Suburbs

Rugby league
- Position: Lock, Prop, Second-row, Centre
Club
Years	Team	Pld	T	G	FG	P
1908	North Sydney	9	2	13	0	32
Representative
Years	Team	Pld	T	G	FG	P
1907–08	New South Wales	4	0	0	0	0
- Source: As of 13 February 2019

Harry Glanville (1880-1959) nicknamed "Dosser" was an Australian rugby league footballer who played in the 1900s. He played for North Sydney in the NSWRL competition and was a foundation player of the club.

== Background ==
Glanville played Rugby Union for Northern Suburbs Rugby Club before switching codes in 1907. Glanville was at the first meeting of the North Sydney Rugby League Football club on 7 February 1908. Glanville was made the first treasurer of the club.

== Playing career ==
Glanville played in North Sydney's first ever game against South Sydney on 20 April 1908 at Birchgrove Oval. Glanville kicked the first goals for the club in a 11–7 loss. Glanville only played 1 season for the club and his final game was a 23–10 defeat against Eastern Suburbs in the 1908 semi final.

Glanville also played in the first ever New South Wales sides in 1907 and 1908.

In his later years, he was a trusted member and employee of the NSWRFL, of which he was a Life Member.
