= Harold Heidke =

Australian rugby league footballer

Personal information
- Full name: August Heinrich Heidke
- Born: 26 October 1887 Bundaberg, Queensland, Australia
- Died: 16 December 1936 (aged 49)

Playing information
- Position: Halfback
Representative
Years	Team	Pld	T	G	FG	P
1909–12	Queensland	12	1	1	0	5
1909	Australia	1	0	0	0	0

August Heinrich Heidke (26 October 1887 – 16 December 1936) was an Australian rugby league footballer.

Heidke came from Bundaberg and was a younger brother of international three quarter Bill Heidke.

A halfback, Heidke represented Australia in the second of four home internationals against a New Zealand Māori team at Brisbane in 1909. He also played an unofficial match for Australia on New Zealand's 1912 visit to the country. Some of his 12 interstate fixtures for Queensland were as a five–eighth.

== See also ==
- List of Australia national rugby league team players
