= Vic Anderson =

Australian rugby league player

Personal information
- Born: 30 May 1886
- Died: 10 May 1970 (aged 83)

Playing information
- Position: Forward
Representative
Years	Team	Pld	T	G	FG	P
1908–11	Queensland	19	1	0	0	3
1909	Australia	2	0	0	0	0

Vic Anderson (30 May 1886 – 10 May 1970) was an Australian rugby league player.

A strongly built forward, Anderson was part of a heavy Souths pack which contested the inaugural season of the Queensland Rugby League in 1909. He came to Souths from rugby union.

Anderson was Australia's hooker for the second of three home internationals against New Zealand in 1909 and in the same year also appeared against a touring New Zealand Maori team.

== See also ==
- List of Australia national rugby league team players
