= Henry Bolewski =

Australian RL coach and former Australia international rugby league footballer

Personal information
- Born: 4 August 1890 Ballina, New South Wales, Australia
- Died: 26 August 1976 (aged 86) Cartwright, New South Wales

Playing information
- Position: Wing, Fullback, Centre, Five-eighth
Club
Years	Team	Pld	T	G	FG	P
1912	Glebe	3	0	5	0	10
191?–1?	? (Queensland)
1915–17	Glebe	30	7	20	0	61
1920	Newtown	9	2	1	0	8
1921	Glebe	8	1	1	0	5
	Total	50	10	27	0	84
Representative
Years	Team	Pld	T	G	FG	P
1913–15	Queensland	5
1914	Australia	1	0	1	0	2

Coaching information
Club
Years	Team	Gms	W	D	L	W%
1944	Wests (Sydney)	14	4	2	8	29
- Relatives: Mick Bolewski (brother); Alex Bolewski (brother)

Henry 'Harry' Bolewski (/ˈbəluːski/; 1890−1976) was an Australian rugby league footballer and coach of the early 20th century. A Queensland state and Australia national representative goal-kicking back-line player, he played his club football in Brisbane and Sydney. Bolewski later coached in the New South Wales Rugby Football League premiership for Sydney's Western Suburbs club. He was also the younger brother of prominent rugby league footballers, Alex Bolewski and Mick Bolewski.

== Playing career ==
From a Polish family and born at Rous Mill near Ballina, Bolewski went to Sydney where he played for Glebe DRLFC, making his first grade debut in the 1912 NSWRFL season. He also played in the Queensland town of Bundaberg, and first gained selection for the Queensland rugby league team in 1913, during which he played in two matches against New South Wales. After moving to Brisbane, Bolewski was selected alongside both of his brothers to play for Queensland against the 1914 Great Britain Lions tourists. He was then the only Queenslander selected to play for Australia in the first Ashes Test against the touring Britons in Sydney, becoming Kangaroo No. 87. He played on the wing and kicked the home side's sole goal in their loss to the British. The following season he rejoined his brother Alex at Glebe, scoring his team's only try in their loss to Eastern Suburbs in the City Cup final. Both players later spent time with the Newtown club. The 1921 NSWRFL season, Bolewski's last, was spent with Glebe.

== Coaching career ==
For the 1944 NSWRFL season Bolewski became coach the Western Suburbs club, replacing Alf Blair, who moved to South Sydney. Wests improved slightly on the previous season, finishing 5th (out of 8), but failing to make the finals, and Bolewski was replaced by club great, Frank McMillan.

Harry Bolewski died on 26 August 1976, aged 86, late of Cartwright, New South Wales.
