= Lancelot Hansen =

Australian rugby league footballer

Personal information
- Full name: Lancelot Rudolph Hansen
- Born: 28 January 1885 Coonamble, New South Wales, Australia
- Died: 21 May 1928 (aged 43) Crows Nest, New South Wales, Australia

Playing information
- Position: Halfback, Five-eighth
Club
Years	Team	Pld	T	G	FG	P
1908–09	North Sydney	11	2	2	0	10
Representative
Years	Team	Pld	T	G	FG	P
1908	New South Wales	1	1	0	1	5
1908	Metropolis	1	0	0	0	0
- Source: As of 14 February 2019

Lancelot Hansen (1885–1928) was an Australian rugby league footballer who played in the 1900s. He played for North Sydney in the NSWRL competition and was a foundation player of the club.

== Playing career ==
Lance Hansen played in North Sydney's inaugural season featuring in 9 matches throughout the season. Hansen played 2 games for Norths in 1909 and then retired from rugby league.

Hansen played 1 game for New South Wales in 1908 and played 1 match for Metropolis in 1 the same year.
