= Ray Laird =

Australian rugby league footballer and administrator (1942–2019)

Personal information
- Full name: Raymond Laird
- Born: 1942; Mackay, Queensland
- Died: 2 February 2019; Mackay, Queensland

Playing information
- Position: Fullback
Representative
Years	Team	Pld	T	G	FG	P
1963–70	Queensland	15	1	14	0	31
1970	Australia	1	0	0	0	0

Ray Laird (1942-2019) was an Australian rugby league footballer who played in the 1960s.

Laird first played fullback for Queensland as a 22-year-old in 1963 against NSW and South Africa and was to be a frequent state rep during the 1960s.

There appears to be some confusion between Ray Laird and Robert 'Bob' Laird (a second rower), Bob Laird played for St George in 1962, Ray Laird was playing in Toowoomba and represented Toowoomba in 1962 against Great Britain.

He was called into Australia's Second Test side that lost to Great Britain in 1970 following an injury to Graeme Langlands. Laird was overlooked for the deciding Test that year when selectors opted for goal-kicking Easts fullback Allan McKean.

Laird died at Mackay, Queensland on 2 February 2019, age 77.
