= Dugald McGregor =

Australia international rugby league player (1890-1948)

Doug McGregor
Personal information
- Full name: Dugald McColl McGregor
- Born: 21 June 1890 Brisbane, Queensland, Australia
- Died: 20 April 1948 (aged 57) Burwood, New South Wales, Australia

Playing information
- Position: Fullback
Club
Years	Team	Pld	T	G	FG	P
	Bundaberg
1909–10	Fortitude Valley	12	2	1	0	8
1912–14	Glebe	37	2	7	0	20
	Total	49	4	8	0	28
Representative
Years	Team	Pld	T	G	FG	P
1909–11	Queensland	14	1	0	0	3
1909–10	Australia	2	0	0	0	0
1912	New South Wales	4	0	7	0	14
1912	Metropolis	1	0	0	0	0

Dugald "Doug" McGregor (1890-1948) was an Australian pioneering rugby league footballer who played in the 1900s and 1910s in Queensland. An Australia national representative fullback, he also played for both the Queensland and New South Wales teams.

== Playing career ==
McGregor played in Brisbane for the Fortitude Valley club. During the 1909 New Zealand rugby league tour of Australia, when the Kiwis traveled to Brisbane for a Test match against Australia, McGregor was selected to play at fullback, becoming Kanagroo No. 46. In doing so he also set the record for the youngest player for Australia at 19 years and 5 days.

When the New Zealand Māori rugby league team toured that year, McGregor played at fullback against them for Queensland as well as Australia.

The following year, during the 1910 Great Britain Lions tour of Australia and New Zealand, when they travelled to Brisbane for a Test match against Australia, McGregor, who was playing for Bundaberg, was selected to represent his country.

McGregor later moved south, joining Sydney club, Glebe for the 1912 NSWRFL season. That year he was selected to play for New South Wales at fullback against Queensland, kicking three goals.
