= Lloyd Weier =

Australia international rugby league footballer

Personal information
- Born: 6 October 1938
- Died: 17 December 2003 (aged 65)

Playing information
- Position: Prop
Club
Years	Team	Pld	T	G	FG	P
	Gympie
19??–6?	Norths (Brisbane)
1964–69	North Sydney	115	13	0	0	39
	Total	115	13	0	0	39
Representative
Years	Team	Pld	T	G	FG	P
1962	Queensland	1	0	0	0	0
1965–66	Australia	3	1	0	0	3
1966	City NSW	1	0	0	0	0

Lloyd Weier (1938–2003) was an Australian professional rugby league footballer who played in the 1960s. A Queensland state and Australia national representative forward, he played his club football in the Brisbane Rugby League premiership for Norths and in the NSWRFL Premiership for North Sydney

Weier had played for Bundaberg and Gympie before joining the Brisbane Rugby League premiership with the Northern Suburbs club. With them he won the 1961 grand final against Brothers. The following year Weier played one match for Queensland against New South Wales.

Weier joined the New South Wales Rugby Football League premiership club North Sydney in 1964. He becoming Kangaroo No. 378 when selected to go on Australia's 1965 tour of New Zealand and playing two Test matches. He also was selected to play in the City New South Wales rugby league team the following year. After six seasons with North Sydney Weier retired at the end of the 1969 NSWRFL season.

In 2008 Weier was named in the front row of the Norths Devils' 75-year anniversary greatest ever side.
