= Stan Carpenter =

Australian rugby league player

Personal information
- Full name: Stanley Franzien Carpenter
- Born: 22 September 1879 Woolloomooloo, NSW, Australia
- Died: 31 May 1962 (aged 82) Adamstown, NSW, Australia

Playing information
- Height: 178 cm (5 ft 10 in)
- Weight: 80 kg (176 lb; 12 st 8 lb)
- Position: Forward
Club
Years	Team	Pld	T	G	FG	P
1908–09	Newcastle Rebels	19	5	33	1	83
Representative
Years	Team	Pld	T	G	FG	P
1909	New South Wales	4	0	0	0	0
1909	Australia	3	0	4	0	8

Stanley Franzien Carpenter, DCM (22 September 1879 – 31 May 1962) was an Australian rugby league player and a decorated soldier of the First World War.

== Biography ==
Carpenter was born in the Sydney suburb of Woolloomooloo and raised in Newcastle, where he worked as a coal miner. He played his early rugby with local sides Carlton and Central Newcastle.

A strong forward, Carpenter captained the Newcastle Rebels for their only two New South Wales Rugby League Premiership (NSWRFL) seasons in 1908 and 1909, playing beside his brother Les. He topped Newcastle's points-scoring in both seasons. Carpenter represented Australia in three matches against New Zealand Māori in 1909.

During the First World War, Carpenter served with the Australian Imperial Force as a stretcher bearer in the 2nd Battalion. He was in the third wave of troops that landed at Gallipoli on 25 April 1915. He took part in the Battle of Pozières in 1916 and was recommended for a Victoria Cross by Major Harold Walker for his efforts in rescuing soldiers under fire. He was instead awarded a Distinguished Conduct Medal.
