= George Watson (rugby) =

Australia international dual-code rugby footballer

- Born: George W. Watson; 6 January 1885 Brisbane, Queensland
- Died: 1961 (aged 75–76)

Rugby union career
- Position: wing
Provincial / State sides
Years	Team	Apps	(Points)
1905–07	Queensland	13	
International career
Years	Team	Apps	(Points)
1907	Australia	1	(0)
- Rugby league career

Playing information
- Position: Centre
Representative
Years	Team	Pld	T	G	FG	P
1908	Australia	1

George W Watson (6 January 1885 – 1961) was an Australian rugby union and pioneer professional rugby league footballer and was one of the first Australian dual code rugby international representatives. He was also one of the pioneer Queensland executives behind the new code in 1908.

== Rugby union career ==
Watson represented for the Wallabies as a winger in the 1907 Test against the touring All Blacks in a team captained by Peter Burge.

== Rugby league career ==
A foundation player at the establishment of the professional code in Sydney in 1908 he played one game only for the Kangaroos, the 2nd Test against New Zealand in Brisbane in May 1908. This was the 2nd international rugby league appearance by an Australian side. Watson played that day in the centres outside of the legendary Dally Messenger.

Five former Wallabies had debuted for the Kangaroos in the inaugural Test three weeks earlier, Watson's league Test debut that day with Bill Hardcastle made them the 6th and 7th Australian dual code internationals.

Since his sole rugby league Test appearance was made as a 1908 rebel before a Brisbane club competition began in 1909, Watson like Doug McLean, Snr. was a Kangaroo with no rugby league club career.
