= Bob Tubman =

Australia international rugby league player (1884–1956)

Personal information
- Full name: Robert Tubman
- Born: 6 June 1884
- Died: 17 December 1956 (aged 72)

Playing information
Club
Years	Team	Pld	T	G	FG	P
	Blackstone (Ipswich)
Representative
Years	Team	Pld	T	G	FG	P
1908–1911	Queensland	14
1908	Australia	2
- Source: RLProject

Robert Tubman (6 June 1884 – 17 December 1956) was a pioneer Australian rugby league footballer, one of his country's first selected national representatives.

== Playing career ==
Tubman was a registered rugby union player in Queensland in 1908 at the time of the rugby league code's inaugural competition year in Australia. He was selected in the first ever Queensland Maroons state representative side to play the new "Northern Union" style of rugby, taking on Albert Baskerville's New Zealand All Golds on their inaugural tour. He would go to make fourteen state appearances over the next three years against New Zealand, New South Wales, Great Britain and the New Zealand Māori rugby league team.

When the New Zealand team came back on the return leg of their tour, they played three Test matches against the first Australian representative sides ever selected. The first Test was played in Sydney on 9 May 1908 with the Kiwis prevailing. Tubman played in that Test at prop-forward and has been allocated Kangaroo representative No. 14. Tubman and his Queensland former rugby union colleagues Micky Dore and Doug McLean snr were all disqualified by the Queensland Rugby Union within days.

During the 1910 Ashes series played in Australia, Tubman made his 2nd and final national representative appearance in the second-row.
