= Bill Heidke =

Australian rugby league player

Personal information
- Full name: William Gustaf Heidke
- Born: 9 April 1883 Queensland
- Died: 28 May 1959 (aged 76) Bundaberg, Australia

Playing information

Rugby union
- Position: Three-quarter back
Club
Years	Team	Pld	T	G	FG	P
	Bundaberg
Representative
Years	Team	Pld	T	G	FG	P
1908	Queensland

Rugby league
- Position: Wing
Club
Years	Team	Pld	T	G	FG	P
	Hornets
Representative
Years	Team	Pld	T	G	FG	P
1908–13	Queensland	4				0
1908–10	Australia	4				0
- Relatives: Les Heidke (son)

Wilhelm Gustaf "Bill" Heidke (1883–1959) was a pioneer Australian rugby league player. He was a backline player for the Australian national team. He played in four Tests between 1908 and 1910, once as captain.

== Rugby union career ==
Heidke grew up in Bundaberg in the Wide Bay – Burnett region of Queensland where he played rugby union. He played for Souths Magpies and represented for Queensland against the professional New Zealand All Golds in June 1908 when that team was on its return from the "rebel" tour to England. Heidke and the other players who breached the amateur code of principal were consequently suspended for life by the Queensland Rugby Union.

== Rugby league career ==
In July 1908 he played for Queensland as a three-quarter in the inaugural interstate game against New South Wales. He switched to half-back for the third game of that series and won selection for the inaugural Kangaroo squad of 1908–09.

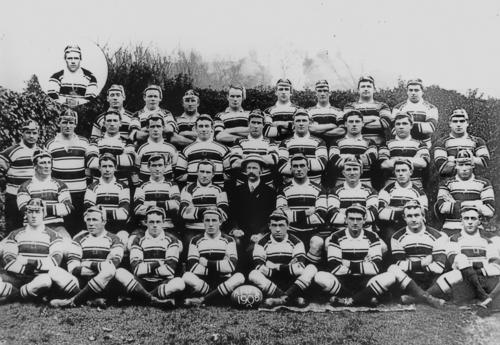
Heidke (3rd row far left) Pioneer Kangaroos 1908–09

He played in two Tests of that first tour and in 26 minor games. He played in the first ever Anglo-Australian test at Wembley in December 1908 and in the third test in Birmingham.

In June 1909 he was chosen in the Australian side to meet New Zealand in the second test in Brisbane.In those early days of domestic Tests the make up of the side was dependent on whether the game was to be played in Brisbane or Sydney. To save on travel costs and to engender local support the Australian representative sides were often selected with a major hometown bias. In 1910 having not played in the first Sydney test against the visiting Great Britain side Heidke was one of seven Queenslanders selected for the second Test in Brisbane. Heidke was given the captaincy over Dally Messenger. In that game Heidke became Australia's seventh Kangaroo captain, the first Queenslander to do so and the only man to ever captain Australia from the wing in a Test match. Australia lost the day 22–17.

In 1932 Bill's son Les "Monty" Heidke also represented for the Kangaroos making Bill and Monty the second ever Australian father-son representative combination one week behind Sandy Pearce and his son Joe Pearce. Bill's younger brother Harold also represented for Queensland in rugby league in 1910–11.

In 2008, rugby league in Australia's centenary year, Heidke was named on the wing in the Bundaberg Rugby League's team of the century.

== Matches played ==
Team	Matches	Years
Queensland	4	1908–1913
Australia (Tests)	4	1908–1910

Preceded by Robert Graves	Australian national rugby league captain 1910	Succeeded by Chris McKivat
