= 1929–30 Kangaroo tour of Great Britain =

Rugby league tour (1929–30)

- Manager: Harry Sunderland
- Coach(es): Arthur Hennessey
- Tour captain(s): Tom Gorman
- Top point scorer(s): Eric Weissel 131
- Top try scorer(s): Bill Shankland 24
- Top test point scorer(s): Eric Weissel 13; Jim Sullivan 6
- Top test try scorer(s): Bill Shankland 3; 4 players with 1 try each
Summary
P	W	D	L
Total
35	26	2	7
Test match
5	2	1	2
Opponent
P	W	D	L
England
4	1	1	2
Wales
1	1	0	0

Tour chronology
- Previous tour: 1921–22
- Next tour: 1933–34

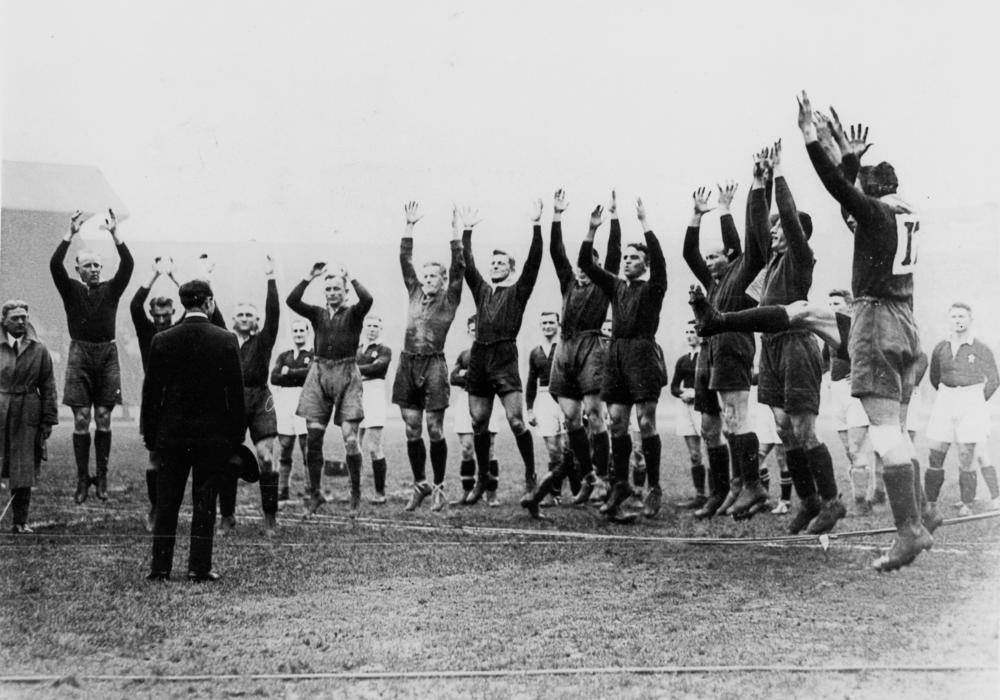
The Australian rugby league team performing their pre-match war cry.

The 1929–30 Kangaroo tour of Great Britain was the fourth Kangaroo tour, and took the Australia national rugby league team all around England and also into Wales. The tour featured the ninth Ashes series which comprised four Test matches and was won by Great Britain. The team sailed on the SS Orsova via the Panama Canal and played an exhibition game in New York before arriving in England.

== Touring squad ==
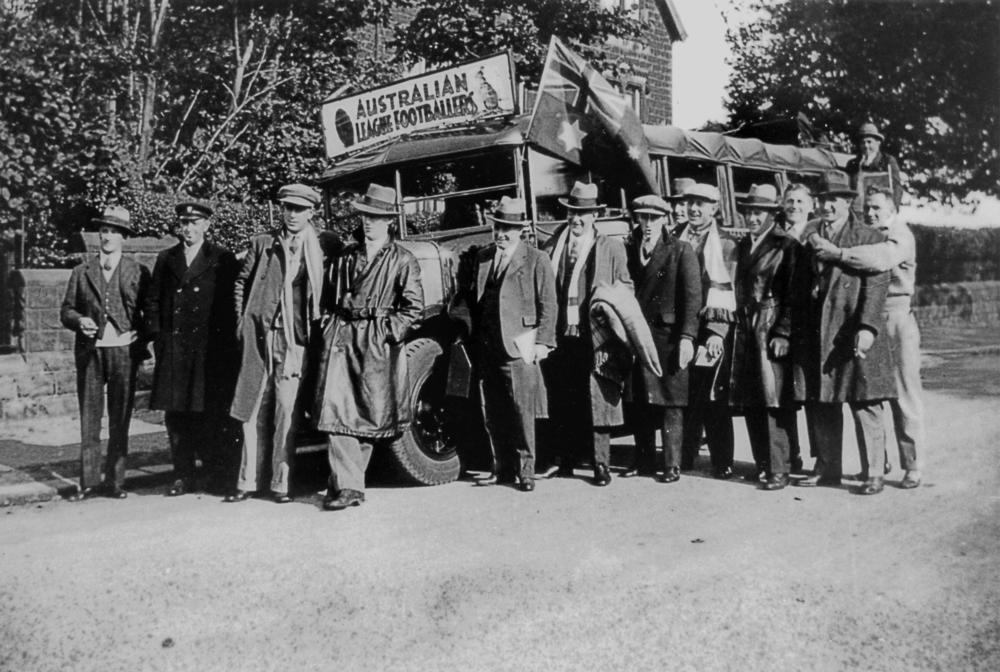
The Australian tourists with their tour bus in England.

A total of 28 footballers were selected to go on the tour: 13 from clubs of Sydney's NSWRFL Premiership, 4 from clubs of the Toowoomba Rugby League, 3 from clubs of the Brisbane Rugby League premiership, 3 from clubs of the Ipswich Rugby League and 5 from elsewhere in country New South Wales and Queensland. In Sydney on 24 July 1929, the day before the Kangaroos were to sail to England, Queensland's Tom Gorman was named captain of the squad. He was the first Queenslander to captain a touring Kangaroos side and would be the last until Wally Lewis in 1986 (Herb Steinohrt was to have led the 1933–34 Kangaroos but declared himself unavailable to tour). South Sydney's Arthur Hennessey joined the tour as non-playing coach, the first such appointment till Clive Churchill in 1959. The tour manager was Harry Sunderland.

The players were paid £4 10s per week from the time they left Sydney till they returned. The English and Australian Leagues agreed on strict rules prohibiting English clubs from signing the Australian players during the tour.

Name	Posit.	Club	Tests
Vic Armbruster	Forward	Fortitude Valley	3
George Bishop	Hooker	Balmain	2
Bill Brogan	Forward	Western Suburbs (Sydney)	3
Joe Busch	Half	Eastern Suburbs (Sydney)	4
Dan Dempsey	Hooker	Tivoli	1
Arthur Edwards	Half	Fortitude Valley	0
Cec Fifield	Three-quarter	Western Suburbs (Sydney)	4
Harry Finch	Three-quarter	South Sydney	0
Tom Gorman (c)	Three-quarter	Brothers (Brisbane)	4
Arthur Henderson	Hooker	Booval	0
Jack Holmes	Half	Newtown (Sydney)	0
Arthur Justice	Hooker	St. George	2
Harry Kadwell	Half	South Sydney	0
Jack Kingston	Forward	Cootamundra	2
Fred Laws	Half	Newtown (Toowoomba)	1
Mick Madsen	Forward	Brothers (Toowoomba)	2
Paddy Maher	Three-quarter	South Sydney	0
Frank McMillan	Fullback	Western Suburbs (Sydney)	4
Wally Prigg	Forward	Central Newcastle	2
Alan Ridley	Three-quarter	Queanbeyan	0
Eddie Root	Forward	South Sydney	0
Les Sellars	Forward	Starlights (Ipswich)	0
Bill Shankland	Three-quarter	Eastern Suburbs (Sydney)	4
Bill Spencer	Three-quarter	? (Bundaberg)	4
Herb Steinohrt	Forward	Valleys (Toowoomba)	3
George Treweek	Forward	South Sydney	4
Jack Upton	Fullback	Souths (Toowoomba)	0
Eric Weissel	Half	Temora	3

== Matches ==
Saturday, 7 September

Rochdale Hornets	3 – 36	Australia

Athletic Grounds, Rochdale
Attendance: 6,521

Wednesday, 11 September

York	11 – 32	Australia

Clarence Street, York
Attendance: 4,729

Saturday, 14 September

Batley	5 – 27	Australia

Mount Pleasant, Batley
Attendance: 6,000

Thursday, 19 September

Widnes	13 – 37	Australia

Lowerhouse Lane, Widnes
Attendance: 6,000

Saturday, 21 September

Broughton Rangers	8 – 21	Australia

The Cliff, Broughton, Salford
Attendance: 6,514

Thursday, 26 September

Lancashire	14 – 29	Australia

Wilderspool, Warrington
Attendance: 24,000

Saturday, 28 September

Wakefield Trinity	14 – 3	Australia

Belle Vue, Wakefield
Attendance: 9,786

Thursday, 1 October

Keighley	9 – 15	Australia

Lawkholme Lane, Keighley
Attendance: 3,000

== 1st Test ==
In the tour matches leading up to the first Test, the Australian team had won 7 of their 8 games. The English team was weakened by the absence of their usual captain, Jonty Parkin (who was suffering from lower back pain), as well as Brough and Ellaby

Saturday, 5 October 1929

The Lions (United Kingdom)	8 – 31	Australia
Tries: Jack Feetham; Alf Middleton Goal: Joe Thompson (1)		Tries: Bill Shankland (2); George Bishop; Wally Prigg; Bill Spencer; George Treweek; Eric Weissel; Goals: Eric Weissel (5)

Craven Park, Hull
Attendance: 20,000
Referee: R. Robinson (England)

Kangaroos 1st Test 1929.

The Lions	Posit.	Australia
Tom Rees	FB	Frank McMillan
Emlyn Gwynne	WG	Bill Spencer
Roy Kinnear	CE	Cec Fifield
Billy Dingsdale	CE	Tom Gorman (c)
Alf Frodsham	WG	Bill Shankland
Les Fairclough (c)	SO	Eric Weissel
Billo Rees	SH	Joe Busch
Harold Bowman	PR	Peter Madsen
Nat Bentham	HK	George Bishop
Joe Thompson	PR	Bill Brogan
Bill Horton	SR	Vic Armbruster
Alf Middleton	SR	George Treweek
Jack Feetham	LF	Wally Prigg

Australia had scored four tries by half time. England's first try came 14 minutes into the second half. This was England captain Les Fairclough's last match against the Australians.

Wednesday, 9 October

Castleford	2 – 53	Australia

Wheldon Road, Castleford
Attendance: 4,000

Saturday, 12 October

Huddersfield	8 – 18	Australia

Fartown, Huddersfield
Attendance: 18,560

Wednesday, 16 October

Leigh	16 – 19	Australia

Mather Lane, Leigh
Attendance: 8,000

Saturday, 19 October

Barrow	10 – 13	Australia

Little Park, Barrow
Attendance: 10,000

Wednesday, 23 October

Leeds	10 – 13	Australia

Headingley, Leeds
Attendance: 10,000

Saturday, 26 October

Hull F.C.	2 – 35	Australia

The Boulevard, Hull
Attendance: 10,000

Saturday, 2 November

Oldham	10 – 18	Australia

Watersheddings, Oldham
Attendance: 18,000

== 2nd Test ==
In response to their loss to the Australians in the previous Test, the British made several changes to their side for the 2nd Test.

Saturday, 9 November 1929

The Lions (United Kingdom)	9 – 3	Australia
Tries: Artie Atkinson; Goals: Jim Sullivan (3)		Tries: Bill Shankland; Goals:

Headingley, Leeds
Attendance: 31,402
Referee: R. Robinson (England)

The Lions	Posit.	Australia
Jim Sullivan	FB	Frank McMillan
Alf Ellaby	WG	Bill Spencer
Artie Atkinson	CE	Tom Gorman (c)
Billy Dingsdale	CE	Cec Fifield
Stanley Smith	WG	Bill Shankland
Billo Rees	SO	Eric Weissel
Jonty Parkin (c)	SH	Joe Busch
Dai Jenkins	PR	Herb Steinohrt
Nat Bentham	HK	George Bishop
William Burgess	PR	Peter Madsen
Martin Hodgson	SR	George Treweek
Albert Fildes	SR	Dan Dempsey
Fred Butters	LF	Wally Prigg

England, with the help of Parkin closed the gap between themselves and the Australians, with Sullivan's goal kicking giving the home team a winning margin of 9–3.

Wednesday, 13 November

Bradford Northern	17 – 26	Australia

Birch Lane, Bradford
Attendance: 7,000

Saturday, 16 November

St. Helens	18 – 18	Australia

Knowsley Road, St. Helens
Attendance: 9,500

Wednesday, 20 November

Yorkshire	12 – 25	Australia

Belle Vue, Wakefield
Attendance: 7,011

Saturday, 23 November

Halifax	9 – 58	Australia

Thrum Hall, Halifax
Attendance: 8,440

Saturday, 30 November

Swinton	9 – 58	Australia

Station Road, Swinton
Attendance: 9,000

Tuesday, 3 December

English League XIII	18 – 5	Australia

Central Park, Wigan
Attendance: 9,987

Saturday, 7 December

Cumberland (Cumbria)	8 – 5	Australia

Lonsdale Park, Workington
Attendance: 3,500

Wednesday, 11 December

Glamorgan/Monmouth	9 – 39	Australia

White City Stadium, Cardiff
Attendance: 3,000

Saturday, 14 December

St Helens Recreation	8 – 22	Australia

City Road, St. Helens
Attendance: 9,000

Wednesday, 18 December

English League XIII	22 – 32	Australia

St James' Park, Newcastle
Attendance: 9,690

Saturday, 21 December

Warrington	17 – 8	Australia

Wilderspool, Warrington
Attendance: 12,826

Wednesday, 25 December

Hunslet	18 – 3	Australia

Parkside, Hunslet
Attendance: 12,000

Thursday, 26 December

Hull Kingston Rovers	5 – 10	Australia

Craven Park, Hull
Attendance: 12,000

Saturday, 28 December

Wigan	9 – 10	Australia

Central Park, Wigan
Attendance: 8,000

== 3rd Test ==
England had held the Ashes for almost 20 years, and this match would decide whether they were to continue doing so.

Saturday, 4 January 1930

The Lions (United Kingdom)	0 – 0	Australia
Tries: Goals:		Tries: Goals:

Station Road, Swinton
Attendance: 33,809
Referee: Bob Robinson (England)

The Lions	Posit.	Australia
Jim Sullivan	FB	Frank McMillan
Alf Ellaby	WG	Bill Spencer
Artie Atkinson	CE	Tom Gorman (c)
Hector Halsall	CE	Cec Fifield
Stanley Smith	WG	Bill Shankland
Jack Oster	SO	Eric Weissel
Jonty Parkin (c)	SH	Joe Busch
Arthur Thomas	PR	Herb Steinohrt
Nat Bentham	HK	Arthur Justice
William Burgess	PR	Bill Brogan
Albert Fildes	SR	George Treweek
Martin Hodgson	SR	Vic Armbruster
Fred Butters	LF	Jack Kingston

It was a freezing afternoon for the deciding test, which Australia dominated yet was still unable to put points on the board. With only a few minutes remaining and the scores locked at nil-all in the third and deciding test, Australian halfback Joe "Chimpy" Busch collected the ball from a scrum win 30 metres out and scooted down the sideline. He crashed over the try-line in the corner with England's loose forward Fred Butters on his back making a last-ditch attempt to stop him. As the corner post went flying the crowd spilled onto the field in excitement. Referee Bob Robinson looked set to award Australia the try and the game (and with it the Ashes) when the touch-judge Albert Webster emerged through the crowd (which was overflowing and allowed on the pitch to avoid crowding) claiming Busch had taken out the corner post before grounding the ball. Even though Robinson believed it was a fair try he had no option other than to rule 'no try'. The referee was reported to have said to the Kangaroos "fair try Australia, but I am overruled", while England's captain Jonty Parkin shook Busch's hand and congratulated him before the touch-judge intervened. The match finished as a 0–0 draw, leaving the series tied at one match apiece.

For the remainder of his life (he died on 29 May 1999 at the age of 91), Busch insisted he scored the try, quoted as saying "I got it down all right...it was a fair try." The corner where Busch scored the disallowed try in Swinton, was in the following decades still officially known as Busch's Corner.

Saturday, 11 January

Salford	5 – 21	Australia

The Willows, Salford
Attendance: 8,000

== 4th Test ==
After much deliberation the controversial decision was made to play a fourth Test a week later. This was the first and only time that a fourth test has been played on any Kangaroo tour.

Wednesday, 15 January 1930

England	3 – 0	Australia
Tries: Stanley Smith; Goals:		Tries: Goals:

Athletic Grounds, Rochdale
Attendance: 16,743
Referee: R. Robinson (England)

England	Posit.	Australia
Jim Sullivan (c)	FB	Frank McMillan
Stanley Smith	WG	Bill Shankland
Stan Brogden	CE	Cec Fifield
Artie Atkinson	CE	Tom Gorman (c)
Tom Blinkhorn	WG	William Spencer
Billo Rees	SO	Fred Laws
Bryn Evans	SH	Joe Busch
Arthur Thomas	PR	Herb Steinohrt
Nat Bentham	HK	Arthur Justice
Billy Williams	PR	Bill Brogan
Hector Crowther	SR	Vic Armbruster
Albert Fildes	SR	George Treweek
Harold Young	LF	Jack Kingston

In this match Cec Fifield broke his ankle and was unable to play the remainder of the tour. In an enthralling and especially brutal match, the deadlock was only broken by Stan Smith's solitary unconverted try so England won 3–0, to retain the Ashes.

== Wales ==
This was the first rugby league international to be played at Wembley Stadium.

Saturday, 18 January 1930

Wales	10 – 26	Australia
Tries: Steve Ray; Mel Rosser Goals: Jim Sullivan (2)		Tries: Jack Upton (2); Arthur Justice; Wally Prigg; Bill Spencer; George Treweek; Goals: Fred Laws (2/3); Bill Spencer (2/4)

Wembley, London
Attendance: 20,000
Referee: A. Harding (England)

Wales	Posit.	Australia
Jim Sullivan	FB	Frank McMillan
Steve Ray	WG	Bill Spencer
Mel Rosser	CE	Jack Upton
Tommy Parker	CE	Tom Gorman (c)
Johnny Ring	WG	Bill Shankland
Dai Davies	SO	Fred Laws
Billo Rees	SH	Joe Busch
Billy Williams	PR	Herb Steinohrt
Les White	HK	Arthur Justice
Joe Thompson (c)	PR	Bill Brogan
Frank Stephens	SR	Jack Kingston
Arthur Evans	SR	Wally Prigg
Jesse Meredith	LF	George Treweek

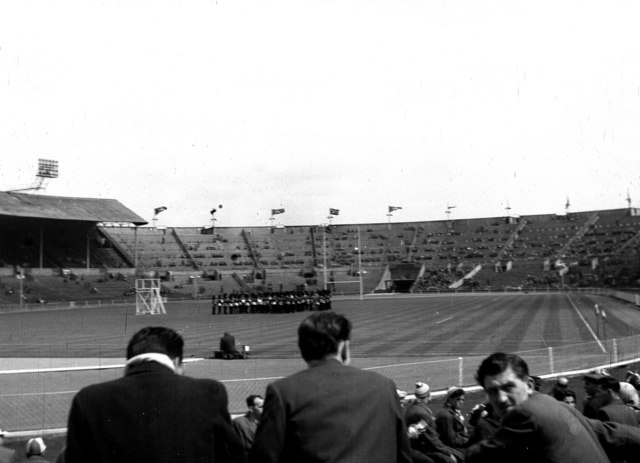
Wembley Stadium
