= 1932–33 Lancashire Cup =

- Structure: Regional knockout championship
- Teams: 13
- Winners: Warrington
- Runners-up: St. Helens

The 1932–33 Lancashire Cup was the twenty-fifth occasion on which the Lancashire Cup completion had been held. Warrington won the trophy by beating St. Helens by 10–9 in the final.

== Competition and results ==
The number of teams entering this year's competition remained at 13 and the same fixture format was retained. There was only one bye in the first round but now also a "blank" or "dummy" fixture. This also resulted in one bye in the second round.

=== Round 1 ===
Involved 6 matches (with one bye and one "blank" fixture) and 13 clubs

Game No	Fixture date	Home team	Score	Away team	Venue	Att	Rec	Notes	Ref
1	Sat 08 Oct 1932	Broughton Rangers	8–6	Wigan Highfield	The Cliff				
2	Sat 08 Oct 1932	St Helens Recs	5–5	Oldham	City Road				
3	Sat 08 Oct 1932	Rochdale Hornets	8–8	Salford	Athletic Grounds				
4	Sat 08 Oct 1932	Warrington	24–14	Barrow	Wilderspool				
5	Sat 08 Oct 1932	Widnes	5–10	St. Helens	Naughton Park				
6	Sat 08 Oct 1932	Wigan	14–3	Leigh	Central Park				
7		Swinton		bye					
8		blank		blank					

=== Round 1 – replays ===
Involved 2 matches

Game No	Fixture date	Home team	Score	Away team	Venue	Att	Rec	Notes	Ref
1	Mon 10 Oct 1932	Oldham	4–0	St Helens Recs	Watersheddings			1	
2	Wed 12 Oct 1932	Salford	26–13	Rochdale Hornets	The Willows				

=== Round 1 – Second replays ===
Involved 1 match

Game No	Fixture date	Home team	Score	Away team	Venue	Att	Rec	Notes	Ref
1	Thu 13 Oct 1932	Oldham	7–7	St Helens Recs	Watersheddings				

=== Round 1 – Third replays ===
Involved 1 match

Game No	Fixture date	Home team	Score	Away team	Venue	Att	Rec	Notes	Ref
1	Mon 17 Oct 1932	St Helens Recs	9–6	Oldham	The Willows				

=== Round 2 – quarterfinals ===
Involved 3 matches (with one bye) and 7 clubs

Game No	Fixture date	Home team	Score	Away team	Venue	Att	Rec	Notes	Ref
1	Wed 19 Oct 1932	Salford	25–11	Swinton	The Willows				
2	Mon 24 Oct 1932	St. Helens	22–4	Broughton Rangers	Knowsley Road				
3	Wed 26 Oct 1932	Warrington	11–8	St Helens Recs	Wilderspool				
4		Wigan		bye					

=== Round 3 – semifinals ===
Involved 2 matches and 4 clubs

Game No	Fixture date	Home team	Score	Away team	Venue	Att	Rec	Notes	Ref
1	Wed 02 Nov 1932	Salford	2–2	St. Helens	The Willows				
2	Thu 03 Nov 1932	Warrington	21–10	Wigan	Wilderspool				

=== Round 3 – semifinals – replays ===
Involved 1 match

Game No	Fixture date	Home team	Score	Away team	Venue	Att	Rec	Notes	Ref
1	Mon 07 Nov 1932	St. Helens	17–10	Salford	Knowsley Road				

=== Final ===
The final was played at Central Park, Wigan, (historically in the county of Lancashire). The attendance was 28,500 and receipts £1,675. The attendance was again a new record – beating last year's total of 26,471.

Game No	Fixture date	Home team	Score	Away team	Venue	Att	Rec	Notes	Ref
	Saturday 19 November 1932	Warrington	10–9	St. Helens	Central Park	28,500	£1,675	2 3	

==== Teams and scorers ====
Warrington	No.	St. Helens
	teams	
Billy Holding	1	R. E. "Bob" Jones
Thomas "Tubby" Thompson	2	Roy A. Hardgrave
Billy Dingsdale	3	George Lewis
Bill Shankland	4	Teddy Butler
Steve Ray	5	Alf Ellaby
Jack Oster	6	Jack Garvey
Dai Davies	7	Harry Frodsham
Jack Miller	8	Bob Atkin
Nat Bentham	9	Dave Cotton
Sammy Hardman	10	Ben Halfpenny
Bill Jones	11	Albert Fildes
Candy Evans	12	Jack Arkwright
Charlie Seeling Jr.	13	Walter Groves
unknown	Coach	unknown
10	score	9
5	HT	7
	Scorers	
	Tries	
Dai Davies (1)	T	Albert Fildes (1)
Thomas "Tubby" Thompson (1)	T	
	Goals	
Billy Holding (2)	G	George Lewis (3)
Referee		A. Brown (Wakefield)

Scoring – Try = three (3) points – Goal = two (2) points – Drop goal = two (2) points

=== The road to success ===
First round
Warrington	24
Barrow	14
St Helens Recs	5-0A-7-9
Oldham	5-4A-7-6
Wigan	14
Leigh	3
blank
blank
Rochdale Hornets	8–13
Salford	8–26
Swinton
bye
Widnes	5
St. Helens	10
Broughton Rangers	8
Wigan Highfield	6

Second round
Warrington	11
St Helens Recs	8
Wigan
bye
Salford	25
Swinton	11
St. Helens	22
Broughton Rangers	4

Semifinals
Warrington	21
Wigan	10
Salford	2–10
St. Helens	2–17

Final
Warrington	10
St. Helens	9

== Notes and comments ==
1 * Match abandoned after 40 minutes

2 * The attendance of 28,500 was a new record for a Lancashire Cup final attendance

3 * Central Park was the home ground of Wigan with a final capacity of 18,000, although the record attendance was 47,747 for Wigan v St Helens 27 March 1959

== See also ==
- 1932–33 Northern Rugby Football League season
- Rugby league county cups
