= Vic Armbruster =

Australian rugby league footballer

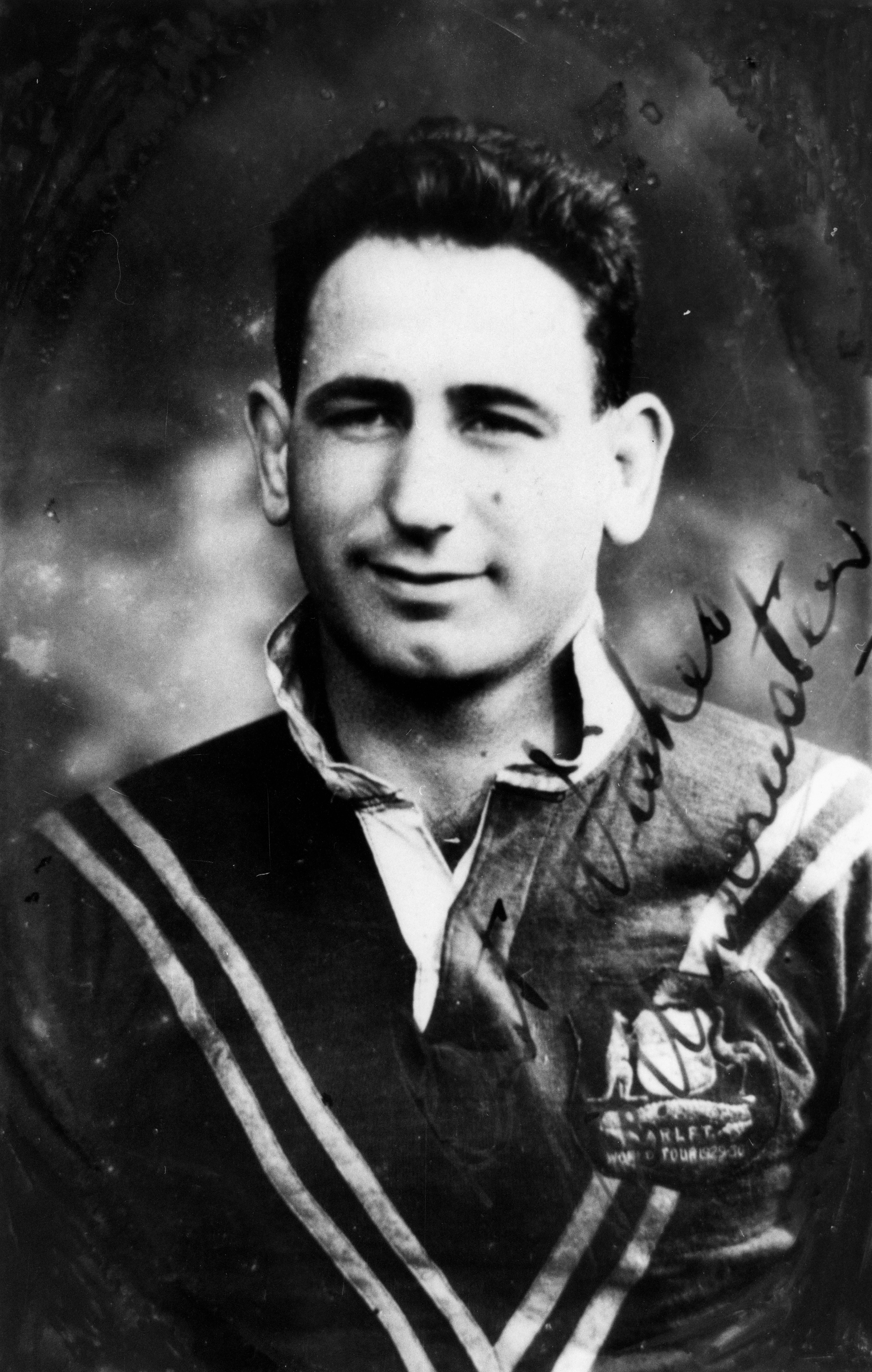

Personal information
- Born: 12 July 1902 Meerschaum Vale, New South Wales, Australia
- Died: 11 October 1984 (aged 82)

Playing information
- Position: Second-row
Club
Years	Team	Pld	T	G	FG	P
1921–23	Mullumbimby
1924–25	Valleys (Toowoomba)
1926–28	Grammars (Brisbane)
1929–30	Fortitude Valley
1931	Bundaberg
1931–35	Rochdale Hornets
	Total	0	0	0	0	0
Representative
Years	Team	Pld	T	G	FG	P
1922	New South Wales	1	0	0	0	0
1924–31	Queensland	48	25	4	0	83
1924–30	Australia	8	2	0	0	6
1933	Other Nationalities	1	1	0	0	3
1923	NSW Country		2	0	0	0

Louis Victor Armbruster (born 12 July 1902 – 11 October 1984) was an Australian rugby league footballer for New South Wales, Queensland and Australia. He is considered one of the nation's finest footballers of the 20th century. Standing 6 feet 1 inches tall (1.85m) and weighing 191 lbs (86 kg), Armbruster primarily played in the Second-row, but he could also play Lock.

Armbruster was born in the small farming community of Meerschaum Vale, New South Wales near Lismore. He began his rugby league career in 1922, he played over 230 games, including eight for Australia, scoring 63 tries and won a premiership in his career.

== Playing career ==
Armbruster's grade career commenced in the country at Mullumbimby, New South Wales from where he gained state selection for New South Wales in 1922. He played in the historic match of 1922 which saw Queensland beat New South Wales for the first time since 1908. Many of the victorious Queenslanders that day would later be Armbruster's state and national team-mates.

Armbruster back row 2nd player from right, with the Kangaroos 1st Test, 5 October 1929

Along with his future Kangaroo captain Tom Gorman and state/national teammate Herb Steinohrt, Armbruster was a member of the 1924-25 world class Toowoomba side that beat all-comers including Sydney premiers Souths, Brisbane, Ipswich and representative sides including New South Wales, Victoria, Great Britain and New Zealand.

While playing with Toowoomba, Armbruster first gained national selection appearing in the 2nd and 3rd Tests of the 1924 domestic Ashes series against Great Britain.

He played with the Grammars club in Brisbane and then Valleys and was a regular representative in the Queensland state side making 35 appearances up till 1931. He was selected for the 1929–30 Kangaroo tour of Great Britain and played in three Tests and sixteen minor representative tour games.

In February 2008, Armbruster was named in the list of Australia's 100 Greatest Players (1908–2007) which was commissioned by the NRL and ARL to celebrate the code's centenary year in Australia.

In 2008, rugby league in Australia's centenary year, Armbruster was named on the bench of both the Bundaberg Rugby League's and Toowoomba and South West teams of the century. He was also inducted in the National Rugby League Hall of Fame.
