= Tommy Thompson (rugby league) =

Former England international rugby league footballer

Personal information
- Full name: Thomas Thompson
- Born: c. 1909
- Died: 22 October 1974 (aged 65) Wigan, England

Playing information
- Height: 5 ft 8 in (1.73 m)
- Weight: 12 st 6 lb (79 kg)
- Position: Wing, Centre
Club
Years	Team	Pld	T	G	FG	P
1927–34	Warrington	202	112	14		364
1934–36	Oldham	7	2	2		10
1936–37	Leigh	46	12	18		72
	Total	255	126	34	0	446
Representative
Years	Team	Pld	T	G	FG	P
1933	Great Britain	1	0	0	0	0

Thomas "Tommy" Thompson (c. 1909 – 1974), also known by the nickname of "Tubby", was an English professional rugby league footballer who played in the 1920s and 1930s. He played at representative level has played for Great Britain, and at club level for New Springs ARLFC (in Wigan), Warrington, Oldham, and Leigh, as a goal-kicking wing, or centre.

== Playing career ==
=== International honours ===
Thompson won a cap for England while at Warrington in 1933 against Australia.

=== Challenge Cup Final appearances ===
Thompson played on the wing in Warrington's 17–21 defeat by Huddersfield in the 1932-33 Challenge Cup Final at Wembley Stadium, London on Saturday 6 May 1933.

=== County Cup Final appearances ===
Thompson played in Warrington's 15–2 victory over Salford in the 1929 Lancashire Cup Final during the 1929–30 season at Central Park, Wigan on Saturday 23 November 1929, and played, and scored a try in the 10–9 victory over St. Helens in the 1932 Lancashire Cup Final during the 1932–33 season at Central Park, Wigan on Saturday 19 November 1932.

=== Notable tour matches ===
Thompson played, and scored all 17-points with three tries, and four goals in Warrington's 17–8 victory over Australia on the 1929–30 Kangaroo tour of Great Britain at Wilderspool Stadium, Warrington on Saturday 21 December 1929.

=== Club career ===
Thompson made his début for Warrington in the 7–39 defeat by Wakefield Trinity at Belle Vue, Wakefield on Saturday 1 October 1927, in the 1930-31 season he equalled Warrington's "Most Tries In A Season" record with 28-tries, subsequently extended by Steve Ray to 33-tries, and then by Brian Bevan to 48, 57, 60, and finally 66-tries, in the 1932-33 season he set Warrington's "Most Tries In A Game" record with 6-tries despite being carried off injured against Bradford Northern on Thursday 6 April 1933, subsequently extended by Brian Bevan to 7-tries, he played his last match for Warrington in the 3–10 defeat by Widnes at Wilderspool Stadium, Warrington on Saturday 30 March 1934, and he made his début for Oldham, and scored a try, in the 7–7 draw with Warrington.

== Honoured at Warrington Wolves ==
Tommy 'Tubby' Thompson is a Warrington Wolves Hall of Fame inductee.
