= Maher Cup =

Australian rugby league challenge cup

The Maher Cup was an Australian rugby league (originally rugby union) challenge cup contested between towns of the South West Slopes and northern Riverina areas of New South Wales between 1920 and 1971. The main teams involved were Cootamundra, Tumut, Gundagai, Temora, West Wyalong, Young, Harden-Murrumburrah, Junee, Barmedman, Cowra, Grenfell and Boorowa.

For more than four decades it remained a particular focus of attention and conversation in these small communities, fostering intense local rivalries. Along with the Foley Shield, it is considered to be the most significant of the regional rugby league challenge cups played in Australia, as well as a sporting and social phenomenon. In parts of New South Wales the Maher Cup "...was to Rugby League what the Melbourne Cup was to racing". According to the Tumut and Adelong Times in 1931:

A battered, lidless trophy! If you saw it in a second-hand goods shop you wouldn't give 5/- for it. Yet it represents the ambition and the dreams of every football club in Group 9, where Rugby League is a religion, and the Maher Cup its idol. Weekly tens of thousands follow the grim battles that are waged for its possession. Interest in the matches is State-wide, but in the South, even the kindergarten kids are gripped with its mysterious fascination.

== Introduction ==
Matches were usually rugged affairs with protests and disputes common. Games were played during floods, snow and other adverse weather conditions. Gambling was an essential element of Maher Cup culture. The winning team would have the right to contest all subsequent challenges on their home ground and (in the early years) would retain the gate takings.

When the Cup was newly captured celebrations would normally commence as the team returned home. In the 1920s and 1930s these trips were usually by special train, returning with horn sounding, and carriages full of noisy supporters. Typically the town band would leading a cavalcade of revellers carrying the cup and players to an impromptu civic reception. Often hastily organised entertainments, such as dances, followed late into the evening. Substantial financial gifts may be placed in the Cup for the benefit of these local heroes To be a Maher Cup player was to be somebody of note in the community.

About 15 to 20 challenges were usually played each year, the peak being 24 in 1953. Initially games were on Wednesday afternoons, changing in 1946 to Saturdays. From then on teams would back up, often with little enthusiasm for Sunday regular competition games. Interest in Maher Cup football probably peaked in the early 1950s, falling away quickly in the mid-1960s.

The Maher Cup produced colourful stories - such as the Cup being placed in jail for its safekeeping, being stolen, vandalised and dumped. There were stories of referees being bribed, knocked out, attacked by women, and refusing to adjudicate due to general player mayhem. Games were often extremely violent with injuries and dismissals routine. Pitch invasions were a perpetual problem for officials. There were claims of teams being unfairly stacked with short-term imports, footballers bribed to lose, and even "ring-ins". Games were played on "ploughed paddocks" infested with rabbits, in heavy snow, and on grounds covered with six inches of water. At Gundagai in 1952 thousands of spectators needed to be rescued from rising Murrumbidgee floodwaters. Also in Gundagai, nuns needed to fight a house blaze due to the brigade, as well as almost everyone else in town, attending the Maher Cup.

Passionate Maher Cup poetry, penned by supporters, was printed in local newspapers, songs composed and fiction published. It was recorded on film by Karl Bounarder of Gundagai as early as 1923. Local newspapers swept up feelings of injustice and foul play. Radio station 2LF of Young broadcast games live into rural homes from 1938. The railways made good profits from supporters crammed into special trains for a day (and night) out.

== History ==
The Maher Cup was donated by Edward John (Ted) Maher in May 1920 to the Tumut Rugby Union. Maher had just arrived in Tumut, from Young, as the new licensee of the Wynyard Hotel. The Cup was rather plain and looked as though it should have a lid. It became known as 'The Old Tin Pot'. Although only Tumut and Gundagai competed in the first two years, it was an instant success. After just three challenges under union rules, it was decided to change to rugby league, a newer, faster, more entertaining form of the game which had swept through the region from 1910. By 1922 crowds of 3,000 were common.

In 1923 rugby league was formally organised in the region with 'Group 9' being established at a meeting at the Grand Hotel, Harden. Group 9 towns became synonymous with Maher Cup towns. As well as the winning club taking all the proceeds from the gate, the spending spectators contributed to the prosperity of local pubs, cafes and other businesses. Labourers, tradesmen, shop-owners, clerks, farmers and farm workers all took pride in a successful team.

Cootamundra became the first club to maximise the economic value of the Cup. They signed a well known Sydney player as captain-coach, Phil Regan from Glebe. Regan created a disciplined, fit and co-ordinated team which featured talented locals such as Eric Weissel, Bill Lesberg, and Jack Kingston. It was not designed to be a perpetual cup and 'Coota' fulfilled the conditions to win the Cup outright by end of the 1923 season. However, it had become so popular and valuable that Cootamundra put it back into play, but with new rules designed to favour the Cootamundra team, including rights to the first and last challenges of each year and control of disputes and the challenge draws.

The Cup remained popular during the Great Depression. Although crowds declined, protests increased in frequency and mendacity. Many clubs made considerable investments building teams of professional imports, with mixed results. In 1932 and 1935 Cootamundra invested heavily in imports. When they failed to wrest the "Win, Tug and Wrangle Cup" back to Fisher Park they were all sacked. Tumut bucked the trend in 1935 producing one of the most successful Maher Cup teams of all time, composed solely of young unpaid locals. In the late thirties Tumut, Temora, Young and Cowra dominated the competition.

Across New South Wales in the 1920s and 1930s teams played for a number of local and regional challenge cups. Southwest examples include the Alley and Prowse, Bancroft, Batsos, Farrar, O'Farrell, Garden of Roses, Jack Hore Memorial, Motor, Tulk and Weissel Gold cups. A successful team may hold half a dozen such cups at a time. The rise of reliable road transportation to nearby places lead to the demise of challenge cups and their replacement by regular competition schedules. The excellent rail system in the region, the large distances between towns, and the popularity of the Maher Cup, delayed the establishment of such competitions in the Southwest. When cars and buses became commonplace and roads sealed, people became less dependent on rail and regular competitions easier to arrange. Although permanent competition football was established in 1938 it still played second fiddle to the Maher Cup until the 1960s.

Play went into recess from 1942 to 1944, seemingly due to economic reasons rather than wartime sacrifice. Petrol rationing, loss of players to the forces, and less promotion of sport in local newspapers, resulted in poor gates. Recommencing in June 1945, Cup football maintained, and possibly exceeded its attraction into the 1950s. The Gundagai Tigers which through the influential Gundagai Independent newspaper had long pushed for the end of the Maher Cup, developed a formidable team, winning 24 matches straight from August 1951 to September 1952. This record was bettered by Harden-Murrumburrah with 29 games in a row from September 1958 to June 1960.

During the 1950s many Maher Cup teams imported top ranking international footballers, often to the detriment of local talent development. Young, Cootamundra and Gundagai were particularly active importers. Rugby Union clubs, which had been completely absent from the Maher Cup towns since 1920, began to become re-established in the late 1950s, perhaps partially due to the over-professionalisation of local Rugby League.

Maher Cup passion started to subside in the early 1960s due to a variety of factors, including the increasing emphasis on Group competition matches; the weakening of Group 9 with the breakaway of the Murrumbidgee Rugby League (of which Tumut, Gundagai and Junee were initiators); population drift, falling standards of play with the introduction of transfer fees; the expansion of Australian Rules football in the area and, likely, television producing greater interest in the Sydney Rugby League competition. Whereas once crack city players could be lured by Maher Cup money, the trend was now firmly in the reverse direction. The final match on 5 June 1971 at Young was won by the club to which it was originally donated - Tumut. In 2013 the 'Old Tin Pot' was polished up and placed in the NSW Rugby League Museum at Moore Park, Sydney, but in 2018 it returned to Tumut where it is housed at the Tumut Bowling and Recreation Club.

== Players ==
Some significant Maher Cup players included: Ray Beavan (Tumut), Bill Brogan (West Wyalong), Doug Cameron (Young), Len Cooper (Barmedman & West Wyalong), Ron 'Dookie' Crowe (West Wyalong and Barmedman), Mick Crowe (Grenfell), Fred de Belin (Cootamundra), Peter Diversi (Gundagai), Cec Fifield (West Wyalong & Junee); Charles 'Chook' Fraser (Gundagai), Viv 'Bluey' Freestone (Gundagai), John Graves (Cootamundra), Abe and Sid Hall (Young), Nevyl Hand (Gundagai), John 'Bronc' Jones, (Gundagai and Tumut), Joe Jorgenson (Junee), Bill Kearney (Young), John Kelly (Temora), Jack Kingston (Cootamundra & Young), Bill Kinnane (Young & Harden), Tom Kirk, (Tumut & Barmedman), Eric Kuhn (Barmedman & Harden), Bill and Jim Lawrence (Barmedman), Bill Lesberg (Cootamunda), Bill Maizey (Cowra), Reg Maker (Temora), Herb Narvo (Cootamundra), Kevin Negus (Cowra, Cootamundra & Harden), Bernie Nevin (Harden), Peter O'Connor (Harden & Young), Col Ratcliff (West Wyalong), Phil Regan (Cootamundra), Norm 'Latchem' Robinson (Cootamundra & Tumut), Wally 'Bull' Tozer (Harden), Dick Vest (West Wyalong & Barmedman), and Eric Weissel (Cootamundra & Temora) Bryan O’Connor (Cootamundra)

== Clubs ==
729 Maher Cup matches were played. The following teams participated: Cootamundra (224 matches), Young (163), Gundagai (155), West Wyalong (152), Temora (148), Tumut (141), Harden-Murrumburrah (123), Barmedman (106), Junee (79), Cowra (63), Grenfell (42), Boorowa (29), Wagga (11), Wagga Kangaroos, Wamoon and Wyangala Dam (3 each), Canowindra, Gibsonvale, Turvey Park and Wagga Magpies (2 each), Bendick Murrell, Binalong, Mallee Plains, Tullibigeal and Ungarie (1 each).

== Matches ==
=== 1920s ===
Defending Club	Score	Challenging Club	Date
Tumut	27-6	Gundagai	Wednesday, 14 July 1920
Tumut	12-12	Gundagai	Wednesday, 8 September 1920
Tumut	6-5	Gundagai	Wednesday, 22 September 1920
Tumut	5-0	Gundagai	Wednesday, 3 August 1921
Tumut	4-11	Gundagai	Wednesday, 17 August 1921
Gundagai	12-0	Tumut	Wednesday, 21 September 1921
Gundagai	12-5	Cootamundra	Wednesday, 21 June 1922
