= Cecil Aynsley =

Australian rugby league footballer

Cec Aynsley
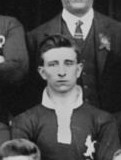

Personal information
- Full name: Cecil James Aynsley
- Born: 23 March 1902 Charters Towers, Queensland, Australia
- Died: 8 May 1975 (aged 73) Brisbane, Queensland, Australia

Playing information
- Position: Wing
Club
| Years | Team | Pld | T | G | FG | P |
|---|---|---|---|---|---|---|
| 1921–25 | Wests Panthers |
| 1926–30 | Ipswich Starlights |
| 1930–35 | Rochdale Hornets |
| | Total | 0 | 0 | 0 | 0 | 0 |
Representative
| Years | Team | Pld | T | G | FG | P |
| 1924–28 | Australia | 4 | 3 | 3 | 0 | 15 |
| 1922–30 | Queensland | 37 | 57 | 45 | 0 | 261 |
- Source: As of 28 July 2025

Cecil "The Red Flyer" Aynsley (23 March 1902 – 8 May 1975) was an Australian professional rugby league footballer who played in the 1920s and 1930s. A Queensland state and Australian representative wing and talented goal-kicker, he scored a try in each of his four national representative appearances.

Born in Charters Towers, Queensland, Aynsley began his rugby league career there before in 1921 playing for the Western Suburbs Panthers in the Brisbane Rugby League premiership. Three years later he made his début for Australia against the touring Great Britain side playing in all three Test matches, scoring on each occasion.

During the 1925 season he toured New Zealand with the Queensland team. He had a tremendous tour, scoring 34 tries in only eleven matches. This leading to the local press proclaiming him as "the Gloaming of rugby league" after the Australian race-horse which enjoyed success in New Zealand. His aggregate of 114 for the tour was beaten only by Queensland captain Jimmy Craig with 126.

He played his fourth and final Test match for Australia in 1928 in Brisbane against Great Britain where he scored his fourth and final representative try.

Aynsley also played for English side Rochdale Hornets from 1930 to 1935. He also played for Ipswich's Starlights club.

== Accolades ==
In June 2008, he was chosen in the Queensland Rugby League's Team of the Century on the wing.

In 2009 Aynsley was inducted into the Queensland Sport Hall of Fame.

In 2015, Cec Aynsley was also selected in the Western Suburbs Panthers (Brisbane) team of the century.
