= Jim Bennett (rugby league) =

Australia international rugby league player

Personal information
- Full name: James Bennett
- Born: 6 June 1898; Toowoomba, Queensland
- Died: 17 September 1968 (aged 70)

Playing information
Club
Years	Team	Pld	T	G	FG	P
19??–15	Tivoli
1916–16	Brothers (Brisbane)
1917–23	Wests (Brisbane)
1918–19	Cairns
1924–33	Brothers (Toowoomba)
	Total	0	0	0	0	0
Representative
Years	Team	Pld	T	G	FG	P
1921–30	Queensland	36
1924	Australia	3

Jim Bennett was an Australian rugby league footballer who played in the 1910s, 1920s and 1930s who played for the Australian national team. A Queensland state representative front-row forward, he played his entire career for clubs in Queensland, and was one of the state's early star players, making thirty-six appearances for the Maroons between 1921 and 1930.

== Career ==
Bennett was still a junior when in 1916 from the Brisbane Brothers club he was selected to represent Brisbane against Maryborough. He spent the 1917 season with Wests Brisbane in the senior grade then headed north to Cairns for the 1918–1919 seasons. He returned to Wests in 1920 and helped the club go through that year's Brisbane Premiership as undefeated champions. In 1921 he made the first of his state representative appearances for Queensland. Over the next nine years he would make thirty-six state appearances against New South Wales and New Zealand and including the 1925 Queensland tour of New Zealand.

Alongside future Kangaroo captains Tom Gorman and Herb Steinohrt, Bennett was a member of the 1924-25 world class Toowoomba side that beat all-comers including Sydney premiers Souths, Brisbane, Ipswich and representative sides including New South Wales, Victoria, Great Britain and New Zealand. He made his international representative debut for Australia in 1924 and played in all three Tests of that year's domestic Ashes series against Great Britain.

He continued playing top-grade rugby league until 1933 and that year was still representing for Toowoomba in the Bulimba Cup.
