= Arthur Henderson (rugby league) =

Australian rugby league footballer (1898–1955)

Personal information
- Born: 1 September 1898 Brisbane, Queensland, Australia
- Died: 11 October 1955 (aged 57) Brisbane, Queensland, Australia

Playing information
- Position: Hooker, Prop, Second-row
Representative
Years	Team	Pld	T	G	FG	P
1923–29	Queensland	34	10	2	0	34
1929	Australia

Arthur Henderson (1 September 1898 – 11 October 1955) was an Australian rugby league footballer.

Born in Brisbane, Henderson started his career with Coorparoo and later played in Ipswich.

Henderson was a regular forward in the Queensland state teams of the 1920s, often forming a front row with Jim Bennett and Norm Potter. He was in the first Queensland side to defeat New South Wales and appeared on their 1925 tour of New Zealand. In 1929, Henderson gained international representative honours on the Kangaroos tour of Great Britain, where he played seven tour fixtures as a hooker and front rower.
