= Snowy Spencer =

Australian rugby league footballer

Personal information
- Full name: William Jasper Gordon Spencer
- Born: 15 July 1899 Esk, Queensland, Australia
- Died: 20 July 1976 (aged 77)

Playing information
- Position: Centre / Wing
Representative
Years	Team	Pld	T	G	FG	P
1922–31	Queensland	33	49	3	0	153
1929–30	Australia	5	2	0	0	6

William Jasper Gordon Spencer (15 July 1899 – 20 July 1976) was an Australian rugby league footballer.

Born in Esk, Queensland, Spencer was a three quarter and spent his early career in Toowoomba. He made his representative debut for Queensland in 1922 and played a prominent role on their 1925 visit to New Zealand, registering 21 tries over the course of the tour, most often as a centre.

Spencer transferred to Ipswich in 1927 through his work with the railways and signed for the Booval Swifts. He moved on to the Bundaberg league the following season.

In 1929–30, Spencer was a member of the Kangaroos tour of Great Britain and featured in all five internationals, consisting of four matches against England and one against Wales. He was utilised by Australia as a winger.

Spencer, a baker by trade, at one point operated a general store in Glass House Mountains.
