= Frank McMillan =

Australian RL coach and former Australia international rugby league footballer

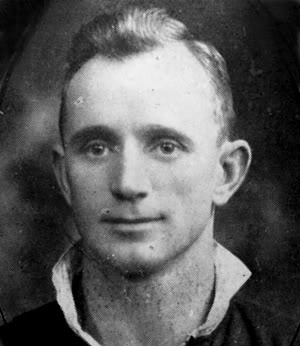

Personal information
- Full name: Franklin McMillan
- Born: 14 December 1899 Menindee, New South Wales, Australia
- Died: 26 December 1966 (aged 67) Taree, New South Wales, Australia

Playing information
- Position: Fullback
Club
Years	Team	Pld	T	G	FG	P
1921–24	Western Suburbs	37	1	22	0	47
1925	Balmain Tigers	12	0	17	0	34
1926–35	Western Suburbs	148	7	83	1	189
	Total	197	8	122	1	270
Representative
Years	Team	Pld	T	G	FG	P
1922–34	New South Wales	22	0	2	0	4
1929–34	Australia	9	0	0	0	0

Coaching information
Club
Years	Team	Gms	W	D	L	W%
1931–1945	Western Suburbs	66	41	2	23	62
1947	Parramatta	18	3	0	15	17
	Total	84	44	2	38	52

Frank McMillan (14 December 1899 – 26 December 1966) was an Australian rugby league footballer and coach. He was a full-back for the Australian national team and played in nine Tests between 1929 and 1934, two as captain. McMillan has since been named amongst the nation's finest players of the 20th century.

== Club career ==
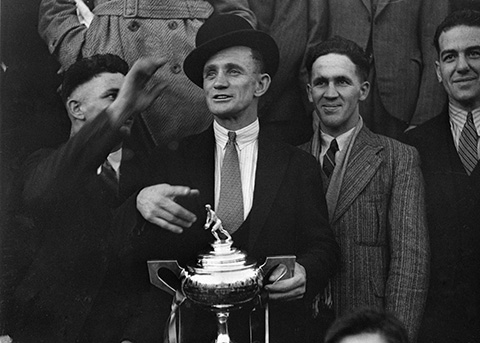
McMillan, as 1934's premiership-winning captain, with the Labor Daily Cup

McMillan was born in Menindee, New South Wales and was graded with the Western Suburbs Magpies in 1921. He played fourteen seasons of first grade rugby league all with Wests, aside from the 1925 season which he spent playing for the Balmain Tigers.

During McMillan's long career Wests were premiers in season 1930 and 1934 and runners-up in 1932. He was captain-coach of Wests in season 1934.

== Representative career ==
McMillan middle, three from left Kangaroos 1st Test 5/10/29

He made his New South Wales representative debut in 1922 and 12 years later he was still the state's preferred fullback. He made 22 New South Wales appearances.

His debut national selection was for the 1929–30 Kangaroo tour of Great Britain. He played in four Tests and 22 minor tour matches. He was the first Australian international representative to come from the Parramatta juniors.

In 1932 he played in all three Tests of the domestic Ashes series.

For the 1933–34 Kangaroo tour of Great Britain McMillan was named as captain-coach following Herb Steinohrt's withdrawal. Australia lost the series 3–0 with McMillan captaining the side in the 1st and 3rd Tests and in 19 minor tour matches including a demonstration match in Paris which introduced rugby league football to France.

Frank McMillan is listed on the Australian Players Register as Kangaroo No. 154.

== Accolades and playing style ==
McMillan's opposing captain and fullback for the 1933 series was British rugby league legend Jim Sullivan. Both players ended their representative careers in the 3rd Test at Swinton. The Andrews' reference reports that when the two had met earlier in the four Tests of the 1929 series some critics rated McMillan's performances as superior to those of the extraordinary Sullivan.

Whiticker's reference suggests that McMillan revolutionised Australian fullback play and quotes rugby league scribe Tom Goodman:.

McMillan began the era of the 'running' fullback. If not the pioneer of attacking play, then certainly the most exciting crowds had seen. He would make daring bursts from his own goal-line, he exploited the "scissors" move with team-mates, he used the punt sparingly but skillfully, and although he is not rated in the same heights as Churchill, as a fullback, whose defence equalled his brilliant attack, he made many gallant tackles of big men

In September 2004 McMillan was named at fullback in the Western Suburbs Magpies team of the century. In February 2008, McMillan was named in the list of Australia's 100 Greatest Players (1908–2007) which was commissioned by the NRL and ARL to celebrate the code's centenary year in Australia.

== Post playing ==
He coached Western Suburbs in 1936, and again in 1945, replacing Henry Bolewski. In 1947 he was the foundation coach of the newly introduced Parramatta Eels.

== Playing career ==
Team	Matches	Years
Wests	148	1921–24 & 1926–35
Balmain	12	1925
New South Wales	22	1922–1934
Australia	9	1929–1934

== Footnotes ==
Sporting positions
Preceded by Herb Steinohrt	Captain Australia; 1933	Succeeded by Mick Madsen
