= Bill Shankland =

Australia international rugby league footballer

Personal information
- Full name: William Joseph Shankland
- Born: 25 July 1907; Bondi, New South Wales, Australia
- Died: 8 September 1998 (aged 91); Warrington, England

Playing information
- Height: 5 ft 10 in (178 cm)
- Weight: 12 st 8 lb (80 kg)
- Position: Wing, Centre
Club
| Years | Team | Pld | T | G | FG | P |
|---|---|---|---|---|---|---|
| 1927–28 | Glebe | 13 | 2 | 1 | 0 | 18 |
| 1929 | Eastern Suburbs | 9 | 10 | 2 | 0 | 34 |
| 1930 | Leeton |
| 1931–38 | Warrington | 231 | 74 | 70 |
| | Total | 253 | 86 | 73 | 0 | 52 |
Representative
| Years | Team | Pld | T | G | FG | P |
| 1928–30 | New South Wales | 5 | 3 | 0 | 0 | 9 |
| 1929 | City NSW | 1 | 1 | 0 | 0 | 3 |
| 1929–30 | Australia | 4 | 3 | 0 | 0 | 9 |
| 1930 | Country NSW | 1 | 1 | 0 | 0 | 3 |
| 1933 | Other Nationalities | 1 | 0 | 0 | 0 | 0 |
| 1936–37 | Dominion XIII | 2 | 0 | 0 | 0 | 0 |

William Joseph Shankland (25 July 1907 – 8 September 1998) was one of Australia's great all-round sportsmen. An Australia national and New South Wales state representative rugby league three-quarter back, he played his club football in Sydney, country New South Wales and then in England, where he became a Warrington Hall of Fame inductee. Shankland remained in England and became a renowned golfer, finishing third at the 1939 Open Championship, and golf teacher.

== Early life ==
Shankland was born in Sydney, New South Wales. He is said to have been an accomplished swimmer, boxer and cricketer, as well as footballer.

== Career ==
=== Rugby career ===
Kangaroos 1st Test 1929.

Shankland played for the Glebe and Eastern Suburbs clubs in rugby league. While playing for Glebe in 1928, the 21-year-old was selected to make his state debut, the following year, moving to the Eastern Suburbs club, Shankland was selected for the 1929–30 Kangaroo tour of Great Britain. The winger played in all 4 test matches and was the leading try scorer on the tour with 24.

On tour, Shankland was pursued by English clubs but returned to Australia, captain-coaching Leeton's club in the Riverina.

In 1931 Shankland signed for Warrington. The 'fleet of foot' wing-three-quarter made 231 appearances for that club, scoring 74 tries and 70 goals. He led Warrington in 2 Wembley cup finals, becoming the first Australian to do so, as well as captaining the side in 2 English Championship finals.

Bill Shankland played in Warrington's 10–9 victory over St.Helens in the 1932–33 Lancashire Cup Final during the 1932–33 season at Central Park, Wigan on Saturday 19 November 1932, and played on the wing, scored a conversion and was captain in the 8–4 victory over Barrow in the 1937–38 Lancashire Cup Final during the 1937–38 season at Central Park, Wigan on Saturday 23 October 1937.

The 1937 season saw him lead Warrington to victory over Barrow in the Lancashire cup final. The 1937 was his last in rugby league, his retirement allowed him to concentrate on his golfing career.

=== Golf career ===
In the years 1937 to 1956 Shankland appeared in every Open Championship except 1948 when he failed to qualify. His best finishes were third, fourth and sixth. His best chance of winning was at Royal Liverpool Golf Club, Hoylake in 1947. Although four strokes behind after three rounds he took 34 for the first 9 holes and then scored 3-3-3-3 to be in a very strong position but finished 5-6-5-3-5 for the last five holes to finish with a 70. Shankland was one of the early starters and his score of 295 was the leading score at the time. His 70 turned out to be the best round of the day but left him two shots behind the eventual winner, Fred Daly.

He finished second at the Yorkshire Professional Championship in 1939, 1947 and 1949, at the Yorkshire Evening News Tournament in 1944 and 1947, at the Yorkshire Open in 1950, at the Spalding Tournament in 1952 and at the Swallow-Harrogate Tournament in 1954. He was semi-finalist at the Daily Chronicle Tournament in 1939. He finished third at the 1950 Irish Open.

From golfing exhibitions, Shankland raised almost a million pounds for charity.

He was an assistant professional at Royal Sydney Golf Club, Australia, and West Lancashire Golf Club, Liverpool, England, and head professional at Marbury Country Club, Cheshire, England, Haydock Park, Merseyside, England, and in 1938 Temple Newsam Golf Club, Leeds, England, where he replaced Percy Alliss.

He was an Honorary Life member of eleven clubs and Honorary member of six clubs.

== Personal life ==
Shankland was married to his wife Daphne for 67 years until her death. He had three sons, two of whom were golf professionals owning golf courses in the United States.

Shankland died aged 91 of heart failure in Warrington, Cheshire, England.

== Professional wins (3) ==
- 1940 Childwall Tournament
- 1948 Leeds Cup
- 1955 Middlesex Professional Championship

== Results in major championships ==
| Tournament | 1937 | 1938 | 1939 | 1940 | 1941 | 1942 | 1943 | 1944 | 1945 | 1946 | 1947 | 1948 | 1949 | 1950 | 1951 | 1952 | 1953 | 1954 | 1955 | 1956 |
|---|---|---|---|---|---|---|---|---|---|---|---|---|---|---|---|---|---|---|---|---|
| The Open Championship | T42 | 18 | T3 | NT | NT | NT | NT | NT | NT | 13 | 4 | | T11 | CUT | T6 | CUT | 41 | 41 | T37 | T40 |

Note: Shankland only played in The Open Championship.

Top 10
Did not play

NT = No tournament
CUT = missed the half-way cut
"T" indicates a tie for a place
