= Australian rugby league's 100 greatest players =

List compiled in 2007–2008

In late 2007, the Australian Rugby League and National Rugby League commissioned 130 experts to select the 100 best rugby league players in the game's 100-year history in Australia. The list was released in February 2008. From this list, a limited panel of experts picked a "Team of the Century" – a team of 17 players considered to be the best Australian players of all time. This team was announced in Sydney on 17 April 2008, see Australian Rugby League's Team of the Century.

== Rugby League's 100 Greatest Players ==
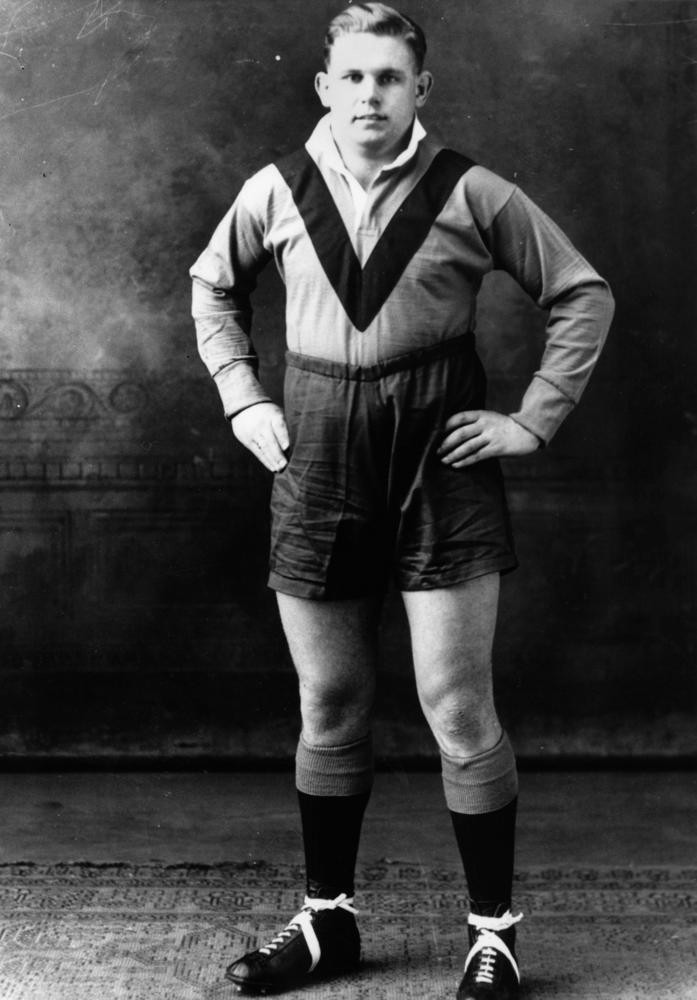
Harry Bath 1945

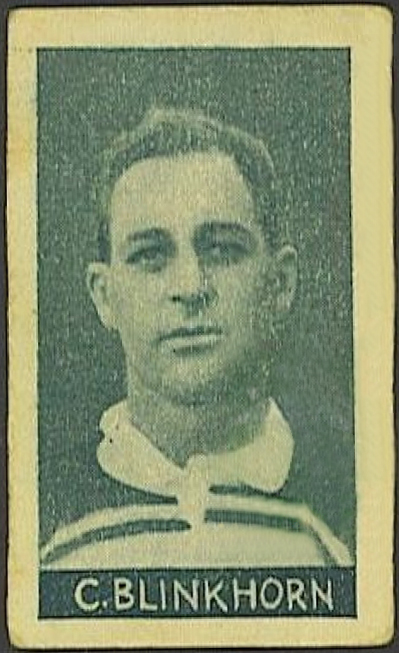
Cec Blinkhorn 1925

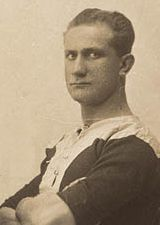
Frank Burge 1914

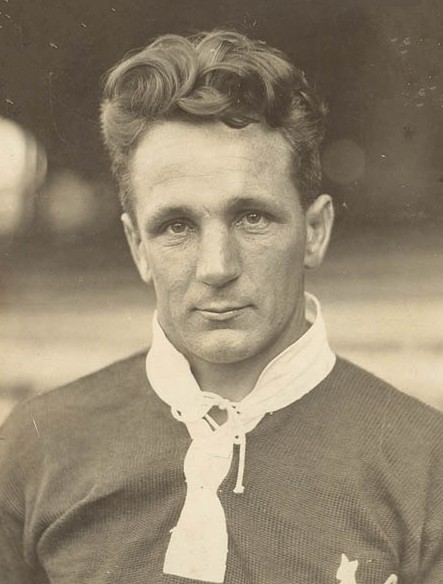
Jim Craig 1924

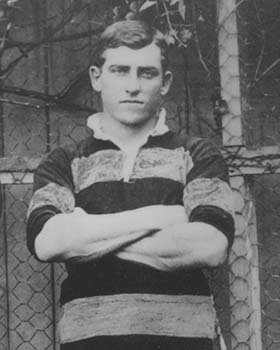
Chook Fraser 1911

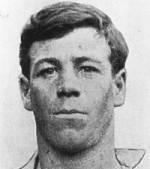
Herb Gilbert

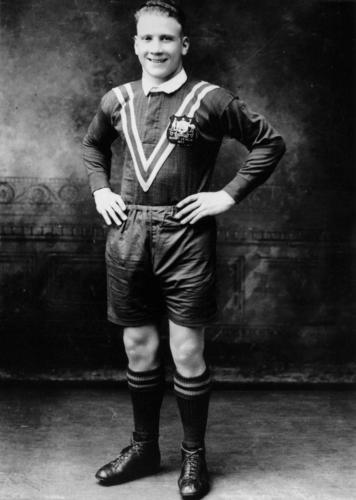
Vic Hey 1930

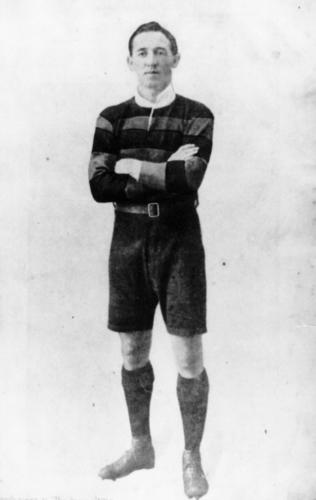
Harold Horder 1919

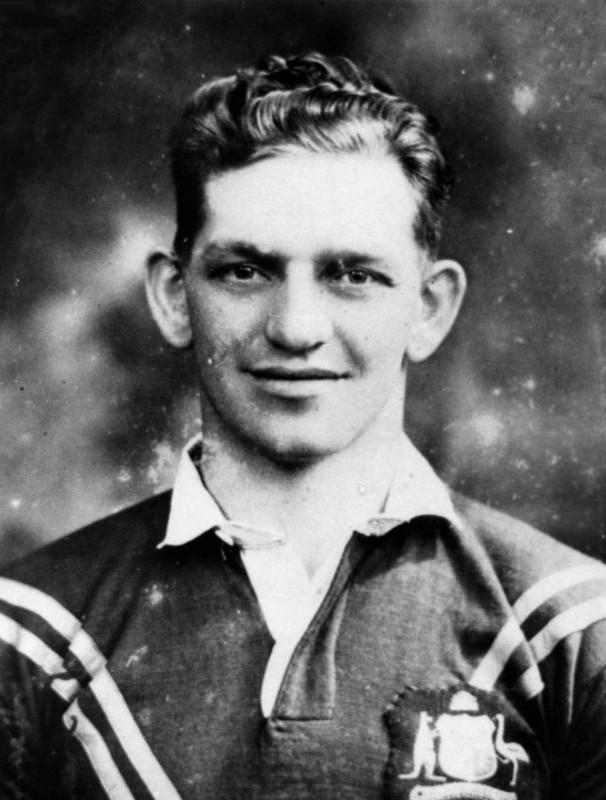
Mick Madsen 1935

Sandy Pearce 1910

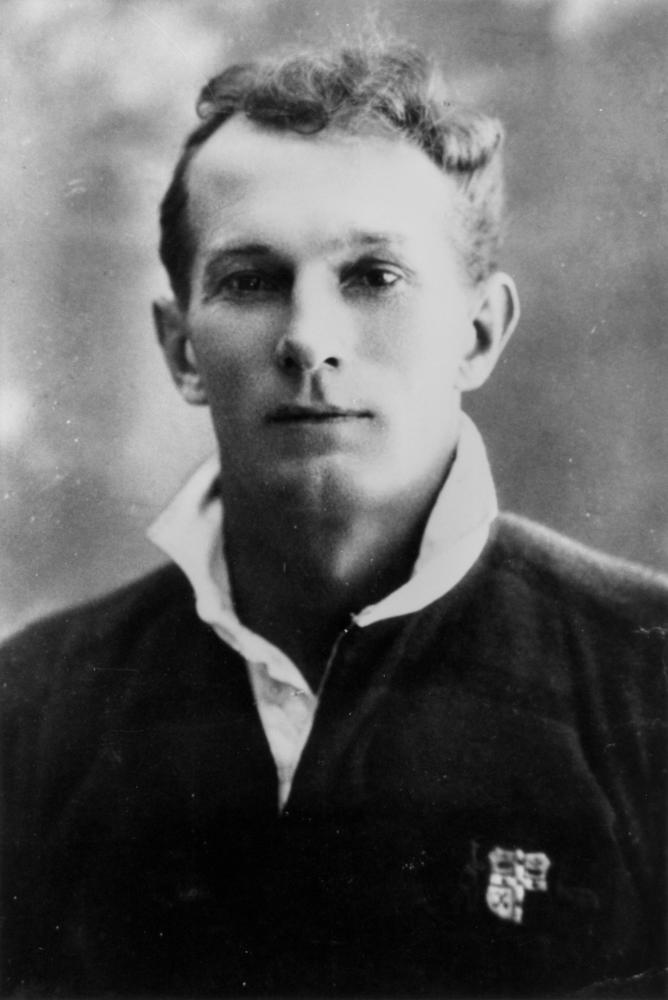
Herb Steinhort 1925

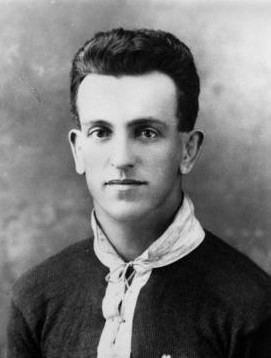
Duncan Thompson

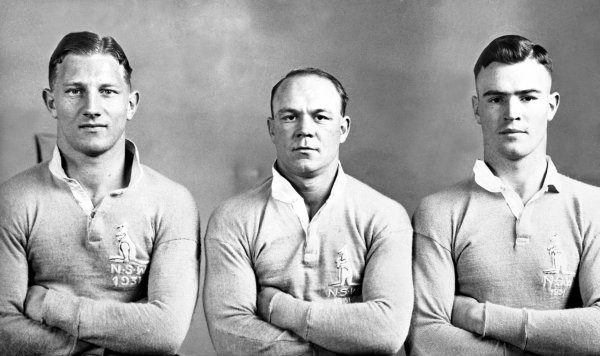
Brown, Norman & Stehr debut together for NSW 1931

Players are listed in alphabetical order.

1. Vic Armbruster, Mullumbimby, Toowoomba Valleys, Brisbane Grammars, Fortitude Valley, Bundaberg, Rochdale Hornets
2. Keith Barnes, Balmain
3. Harry Bath, Brisbane Souths, Balmain, Barrow, Warrington, St George
4. Jack Beaton, Eastern Suburbs
5. Arthur Beetson, Balmain, Eastern Suburbs, Parramatta, Hull KR
6. Brian Bevan, Eastern Suburbs, Warrington, Blackpool Borough
7. Cec Blinkhorn, North Sydney, South Sydney
8. Kerry Boustead, Eastern Suburbs, Manly, North Sydney, Hull KR
9. Dave Brown, Eastern Suburbs, Warrington
10. Roy Bull, Manly
11. Frank Burge, Glebe, St George
12. Joe "Chimpy" Busch, Eastern Suburbs, Balmain
13. Billy Cann, South Sydney
14. Brian Carlson, Newcastle, North Sydney
15. Clive Churchill, South Sydney
16. Brian Clay, Newtown, St George
17. Arthur Clues, Western Suburbs, Leeds, Hunslet
18. Bradley Clyde, Canberra, Bulldogs, Leeds
19. Ron Coote, South Sydney, Eastern Suburbs
20. Ted "Tedda" Courtney, Newtown, Western Suburbs, North Sydney
21. Jimmy Craig, Balmain, University, Western Suburbs
22. Michael Cronin, Parramatta
23. Les Cubitt, Glebe, Eastern Suburbs
24. Laurie Daley, Canberra
25. Brian Davies, Brisbane Brothers, Canterbury
26. Dan Dempsey, Ipswich
27. Graham Eadie, Manly, Halifax
28. Andrew Ettingshausen, Cronulla, Leeds
29. Viv Farnsworth, Newtown, Western Suburbs
30. Brad Fittler, Penrith, Sydney Roosters
31. Charles "Chook" Fraser, Balmain
32. Dan Frawley, Eastern Suburbs
33. Bob Fulton, Manly, Eastern Suburbs, Warrington
34. Peter Gallagher, Brisbane Brothers
35. Reg Gasnier, St George
36. Herb Gilbert, South Sydney, Western Suburbs, Hull FC
37. Tom Gorman, Toowoomba, Brisbane Brothers
38. Eric Grothe Sr, Parramatta, Leeds
39. Duncan Hall, Brisbane Valleys, Toowoomba, Brisbane Wests
40. Howard Hallett, South Sydney
41. Arthur "Pony" Halloway, Glebe, Eastern Suburbs, Balmain
42. Brian Hambly, Wagga Wagga, South Sydney, Parramatta
43. Vic Hey, Western Suburbs, Toowoomba, Parramatta
44. Keith Holman, Western Suburbs
45. Harold Horder, South Sydney, North Sydney
46. Ken Irvine, North Sydney, Manly
47. Andrew Johns, Newcastle Knights
48. Les Johns, Canterbury
49. Ken Kearney, St George
50. Noel Kelly, Ipswich, Western Suburbs
51. Brett Kenny, Parramatta, Wigan
52. Johnny King, St George
53. Terry Lamb, Western Suburbs, Canterbury
54. Allan Langer, Ipswich, Brisbane Broncos, Warrington
55. Graeme Langlands, St George
56. Glenn Lazarus, Canberra, Brisbane Broncos, Melbourne
57. Wally Lewis, Brisbane Valleys, Wynnum-Manly, Wakefield Trinity, Brisbane Broncos, Gold Coast
58. Darren Lockyer, Brisbane Broncos
59. Eddie Lumsden, Manly, St George
60. Mick Madsen, Toowoomba
61. Bob McCarthy, South Sydney, Canterbury
62. Chris McKivat, Glebe
63. Frank McMillan, Western Suburbs, Balmain
64. Mal Meninga, Souths Brisbane, St. Helens, Canberra
65. Dally Messenger, Eastern Suburbs
66. Gene Miles, Wynnum-Manly, Brisbane Broncos, Wigan
67. Steve Mortimer, Canterbury
68. Barry Muir, Brisbane Wests
69. Herb Narvo, Newtown, St George
70. Ernie Norman, Eastern Suburbs
71. Andy Norval, Eastern Suburbs
72. John O'Neill, South Sydney, Manly
73. Kel O'Shea, Western Suburbs
74. Joe Pearce, Eastern Suburbs
75. Sandy Pearce, Eastern Suburbs
76. Wayne Pearce, Balmain
77. Ray Price, Parramatta, Wakefield Trinity
78. Wally Prigg, St George
79. Norm Provan, St George
80. Johnny Raper, Newtown, St George
81. Tom Raudonikis, Western Suburbs, Newtown
82. Steve Roach, Balmain, Warrington
83. Steve Rogers, Cronulla-Sutherland, St. George, Widnes
84. Albert Rosenfeld, Eastern Suburbs, Huddersfield, Wakefield Trinity, Bradford Northern
85. John Sattler, South Sydney
86. Billy Smith, St George
87. Ray Stehr, Eastern Suburbs
88. Herb Steinohrt, Toowoomba
89. Peter Sterling, Parramatta, Hull FC
90. Arthur Summons, Western Suburbs
91. Viv Thicknesse, Eastern Suburbs
92. Duncan Thompson, North Sydney, Toowoomba
93. Ken Thornett, Parramatta, Leeds
94. George Treweek, South Sydney
95. Ian Walsh, Eugowra, St George
96. Steve Walters, Canberra, North Queensland Cowboys, Newcastle Knights
97. Benny Wearing, South Sydney
98. Shane Webcke, Brisbane Broncos
99. Eric Weissel, Cootamundra, Temora, Barmedman, Narrandera, Wagga Wagga
100. Harry Wells, Wollongong, South Sydney, Western Suburbs

== Players by club ==
=== NSWRL/ARL/NRL ===
Players	Club
23	Eastern Suburbs Roosters
14	South Sydney Rabbitohs
14	Western Suburbs Magpies
13	St. George Dragons
10	Balmain Tigers
9	Parramatta Eels
7	Manly Sea Eagles
7	North Sydney Bears
6	Brisbane Broncos
6	Newtown Jets
6	Canterbury Bulldogs
5	Canberra Raiders
4	Glebe
2	Cronulla Sharks
2	Newcastle Knights
2	Melbourne Storm
1	Gold Coast
1	Penrith Panthers
1	University

=== Brisbane Rugby League ===
Players	Club
3	Fortitude Valley Diehards
2	Wests Panthers
2	Wynnum-Manly Seagulls
1	Northern Suburbs/Grammars
1	Ipswich
1	Souths Magpies

=== Other ===
Players	Club
2	Newcastle
6	Warrington (England)
1	Temora
1	Blackpool Borough (England)

Eugowra 1

== See also ==
- Australian rugby league team of the century
- List of Australia national rugby league team players
