= Arthur Edwards (rugby league) =

Australian rugby league player

Personal information
- Full name: Arthur George James Edwards
- Born: 19 December 1901; Fortitude Valley, QLD, Australia
- Died: 1 September 1979 (aged 77)

Playing information
- Position: Halfback
Club
Years	Team	Pld	T	G	FG	P
1933	North Sydney	6	0	0	0	0
Representative
Years	Team	Pld	T	G	FG	P
1924–31	Queensland	37	7	5	0	31
1928	Australia	1	0	0	0	0

Coaching information
Club
Years	Team	Gms	W	D	L	W%
1933	North Sydney	9	3	0	6	33

Arthur George James Edwards (19 December 1901 – 1 September 1979) was an Australian rugby league player and coach active during the 1920s and 1930s.

Raised in Fortitude Valley, Brisbane, Edwards was a halfback, commonly known by his nickname "Fatty". He played his junior rugby league for the Commercial Football Club, before making his senior debut with Brisbane club Valleys in 1923. Brisbane representative honours came only two games into his career and he made his debut for Queensland during his second year of senior rugby league.

Edwards was Australia's halfback in a 1928 home international against Great Britain. He also toured England with the national team at the end of 1929, but was unable to displace Joe Busch at halfback for the Test matches.

With prior experience as coach of Gympie, Edwards was appointed playing-coach of North Sydney for the 1933 NSWRFL season, but had to resign nine rounds into the season due to injury and joined Goulburn as coach.

Edwards was the grandfather of broadcaster Laurel Edwards.
