= George Bishop (rugby league) =

Australian rugby league footballer

Personal information
- Full name: George Bishop
- Born: 19 November 1902 Goulburn, New South Wales, Australia
- Died: 1 May 1972 (aged 69) Sydney, New South Wales, Australia

Playing information
- Position: Lock, Second-row, Hooker
Club
Years	Team	Pld	T	G	FG	P
1923	Balmain	1	0	0	0	0
1924–26	Parkes
1927–35	Balmain	80	10	22	0	74
	Total	81	10	22	0	74
Representative
Years	Team	Pld	T	G	FG	P
1927–33	New South Wales	13	1	4	0	11
1930–31	NSW City	2	1	0	0	3
1929	Australia	2	1	0	0	3

Refereeing information
Years	Competition	Apps
1938–52	NSWRFL	211
1939–51	Interstate Series	5
1950–52	Test matches	4
- Source: As of 16 May 2019

George Bishop (1902-1972) was an Australian professional rugby league footballer of the 1920s and 1930s, and referee of the 1930s, 1940s, and 1950s. He played for Balmain, primarily as a hooker, and earned selection for the Australian national team. He later became a well known referee in the New South Wales Rugby Football League (NSWRFL) competition.

== Playing career ==
Bishop played for Gladesville in 1919 before moving into Balmain's reserve team. He made his first grade debut for Balmain against rivals Glebe in Round 16, 1923, at Birchgrove Oval. Bishop then departed Balmain and signed with Parkes in the country competition. The following season, Balmain won the premiership after defeating South Sydney 3–0 in the final.

After three seasons with Parkes, Bishop returned to Balmain. Bishop finished as Balmain's top try scorer on his first season back with the club.

In the same year, Bishop earned his first representative honour as he was selected to play for Metropolis and New South Wales. In 1929, Bishop was selected to play for Australia on the Kangaroo Tour and participated in test matches against Great Britain.

Over the coming years, Bishop would continue to be selected at the representative level, but premiership success would elude him, with Balmain only reaching the finals once in his entire playing career. Towards the end of his career in 1933, Bishop was selected for a second Kangaroo Tour but was ruled out due to injury.

== Refereeing career ==
In 1937, Bishop was graded as a referee. In 1939, Bishop was the referee as his old club, Balmain, defeated South Sydney in the grand final. Bishop then went on to the referee in two other grand finals featuring Balmain in 1946 and 1948. The following year, Bishop was the referee in the 1949 NSWRFL grand final between St George and South Sydney.

When Western Suburbs met South Sydney in the 1952 NSWRFL decider, Bishop was selected as the referee in what would turn out to be his last match as an official. The match was remembered for much controversy, including South Sydney claims that Western Suburbs scored two tries off forward passes and that South Sydney had two fair tries disallowed.

Wests went on to win the premiership and Bishop stood down as a referee after the game ended. In the aftermath, Souths captain reportedly never spoke to Bishop again despite both of them living in the same suburb for many years. In total, Bishop refereed 223 first grade matches from 1938 to 1952.

In 1955, Bishop became part of the national selection panel who selected the Australian team. Bishop was later sacked from the panel after he was accused of leaking information that Harry Wells had been dropped from Australia's Third Test team against France.
