= Billy Holding =

English rugby league footballer

Personal information
- Full name: William John Holding
- Born: 18 January 1907; Cockermouth district, England
- Died: 1 November 1986 (aged 79); Maryport, England

Playing information
- Position: Fullback
Club
Years	Team	Pld	T	G	FG	P
1928–38	Warrington	327	6	830	4	1686
1939–40	Rochdale Hornets	23	0	55	0	110
1940	Warrington	1	0	0	0	0
1945–46	Workington Town	19	0	30	0	60
	Total	370	6	915	4	1856
Representative
Years	Team	Pld	T	G	FG	P
1929–38	Cumberland	14	1	45	0	93

William John Holding (18 January 1907 – 1 November 1986) was an English professional rugby league footballer who played in the 1920s, 1930s and 1940s. He played at representative level for Cumberland, and at club level for Warrington (two spells), and Rochdale Hornets as a goal-kicking fullback.

== Background ==
Holding's birth was registered in Cockermouth district, Cumberland, England, and he died aged 79 in Maryport, Cumbria, England.

== Playing career ==
=== County honours ===
Holding represented Cumberland while at Warrington.

=== Championship final appearances ===
Holding played in Warrington's 3-14 defeat by Swinton in the Championship Final during the 1934–35 season, and the 11-13 defeat by Salford in the Championship Final during the 1936–37 season.

=== Challenge Cup Final appearances ===
Holding played fullback, and scored four goals in Warrington's 17-21 defeat by Huddersfield in the 1933 Challenge Cup Final during the 1932–33 season at Wembley Stadium, London on Saturday 6 May 1933, due to a broken leg he missed the 1935–36 Challenge Cup Final during the 1935–36 season.

=== County Cup Final appearances ===
Holding played, and scored three goals in Warrington's 15-2 victory over Salford in the 1929 Lancashire Cup Final during the 1929–30 season at Central Park, Wigan on Saturday 23 November 1929, and played, and scored two goals in the 10-9 victory over St.Helens in the 1932 Lancashire Cup Final during the 1932–33 season at Central Park, Wigan on Saturday 19 November 1932, but he did not play in the 8-4 victory over Barrow in the 1937 Lancashire Cup Final during the 1937–38 season at Central Park, Wigan on Saturday 23 October 1937, in front of a crowd of 12,000.

=== Club career ===
Holding made his Warrington début against York at Wilderspool Stadium, Warrington in January 1928, he was the first Warrington player to kick 100-goals in a season, first achieving this feat on the final day of the 1930–31 season, he twice again he reached 100-goals, kicking a record 125-goals in the 1932–33 season, due to a broken leg he missed the 2-18 defeat by Leeds in the 1936 Challenge Cup Final during the 1935–36 season at Wembley Stadium, London on Saturday 18 April 1936, his broken leg also cost him a place on the 1936 Great Britain Lions tour of Australia and New Zealand.

=== Testimonial match ===
Holding's Testimonial match at Warrington took place in 1938, and raised £121 5s 1d, (based on increases in average earnings, this would be approximately £18,530 in 2013).

== Honoured at Warrington Wolves ==
Holding is a Warrington Wolves Hall of Fame inductee.
