= Jack Upton =

Australian rugby league footballer (1906–1969)

Personal information
- Full name: Jack William Upton
- Born: 27 March 1906 Toowoomba, Queensland, Australia
- Died: 4 April 1969 (aged 63)

Playing information
- Position: Fullback, Wing, Centre
Representative
Years	Team	Pld	T	G	FG	P
1927–32	Queensland	25	19	20	0	97
1930	Australia	1	2	0	0	6

Jack William Upton (27 March 1906 – 4 April 1969) was an Australian rugby league footballer.

A native of Toowoomba, Upton played as a winger, centre and fullback, and was noted for his side–step and goal–kicking abilities on the field.

Upton gained a call up for the 1929–30 Kangaroo tour of Great Britain on the back of a strong interstate series for Queensland. His tour consisted of 18 matches and he crossed for 10 tries, which included two in the final international against Wales at Wembley. He continued representing his state until 1932 and was a member of the Toowoomba team that held the 1932 Great Britain Lions to a draw.
