= Les Sellars =

Australian rugby league footballer (1905–1977)

Personal information
- Full name: Leslie Alexander Sellars
- Born: 16 June 1905 Warwick, Queensland, Australia
- Died: 12 August 1977 (aged 72)

Playing information
- Position: Lock
Representative
Years	Team	Pld	T	G	FG	P
1928–30	Queensland	13	6	0	0	18
1929	Australia

Leslie Alexander Sellars (16 June 1905 – 12 August 1977) was an Australian rugby league footballer.

Sellars was born in Warwick, Queensland, and played his early rugby league in Stanthorpe.

A forward, Sellars was primarily a lock and played briefly with Brisbane club Coorparoo before arriving in Ipswich, where he joined Starlights. He served as captain of Ipswich in the Bulimba Cup, represented Queensland from 1928 to 1930, and was a member of the 1929–30 Kangaroo tour of Great Britain, making eight uncapped appearances.
