= Queensland Rugby League's Team of the Century =

The team as painted by Dave Thomas

The Queensland Rugby League Team of the Century is a hypothetical team comprising the best players who have played for Queensland to form a team for 1909 until 2008. Rugby league in Queensland was initiated in 1909 with the Queensland Rugby Football League competition, which evolved into the Brisbane Rugby Football League in 1922. In 1988, a national competition encompassing all Australian states including Queensland meant that the Brisbane Rugby Football League competition became a second tier to the national competition. Today, four Queensland clubs participate in the national competition while two formerly did so.

The team was announced at the Brisbane Convention and Exhibition Centre on 10 June 2008, ahead of the second State of Origin game in Brisbane. The players eligible for the team are players originally from Queensland and even though some players went to New South Wales and played for them under residential selection rules, these players could be chosen under their place of origin. The team was picked by a team of six judges in 2008 from a list of 100 nominated players. The judges were former administrator Kevin Brasch, former Queensland halfback Cyril Connell, writer Ian Heads, historian Professor Max Howell, commentator John McCoy and historian Greg Shannon.

== The team ==
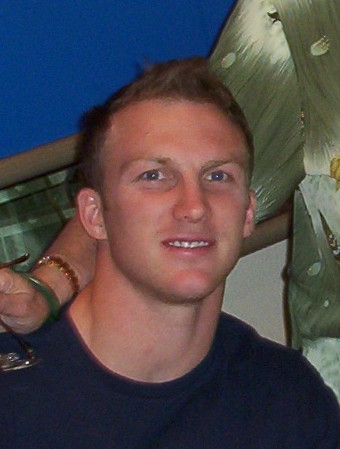
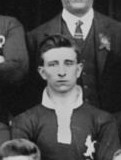
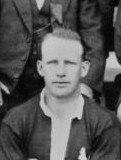
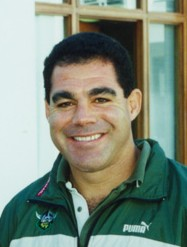
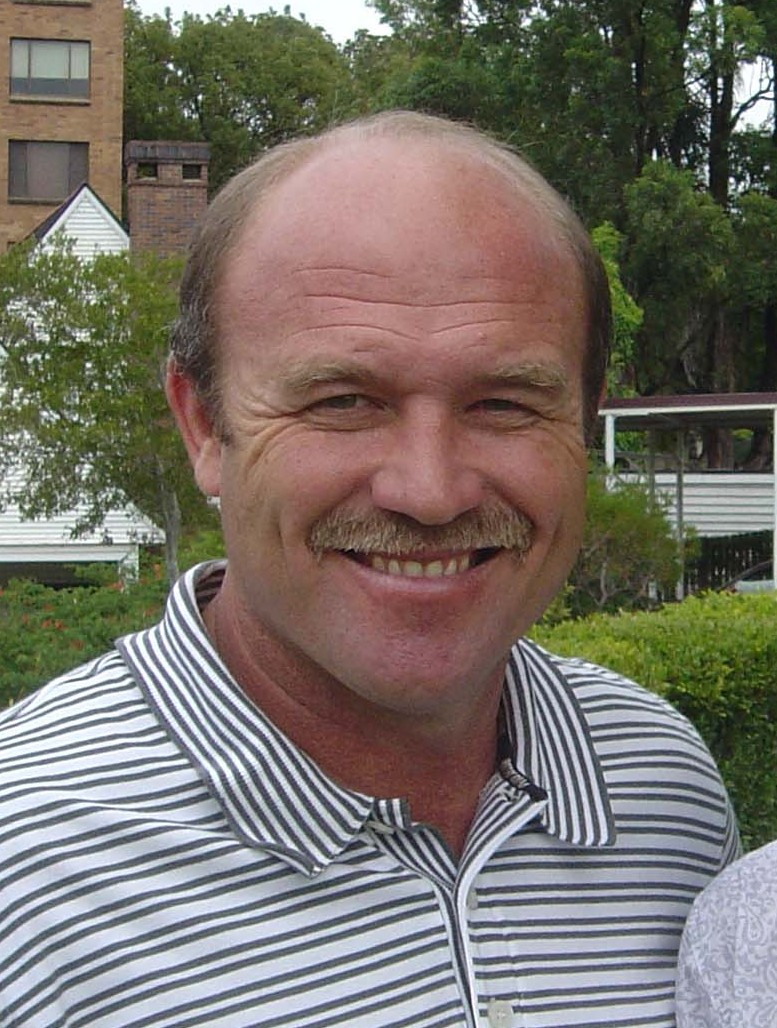
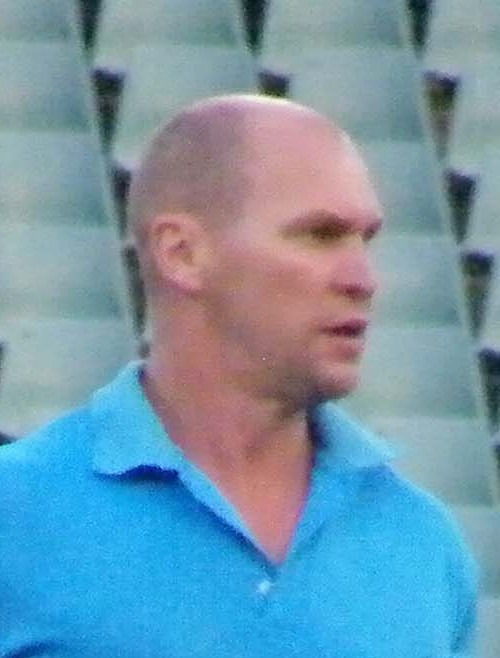
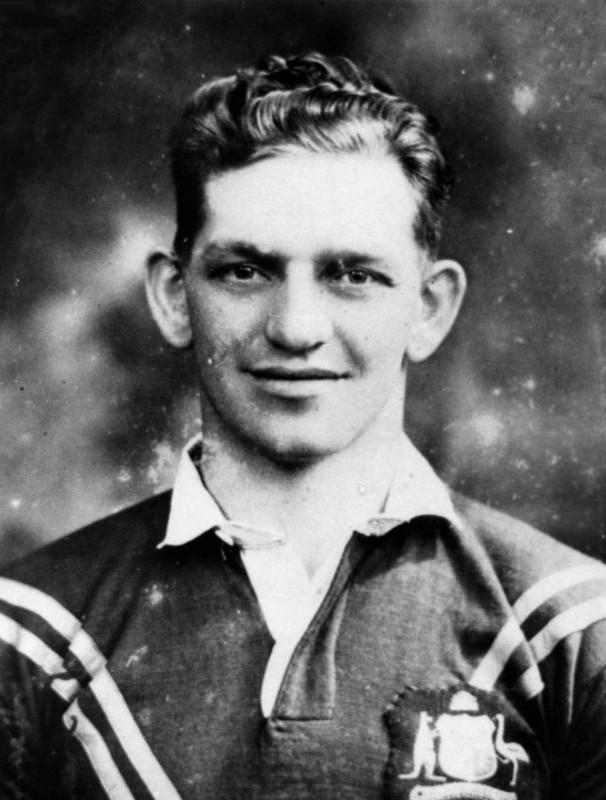
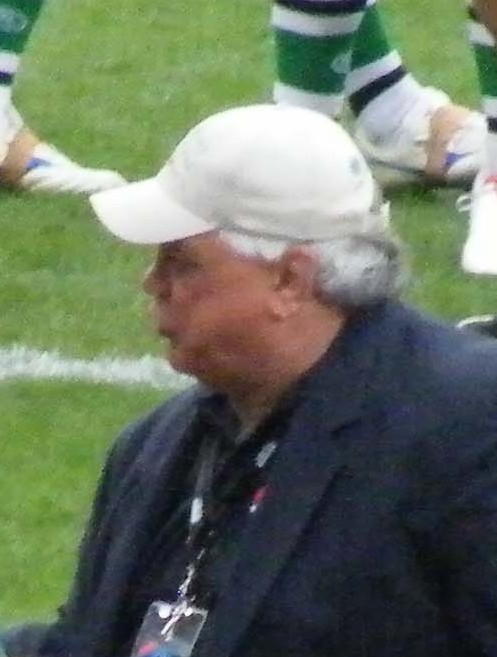
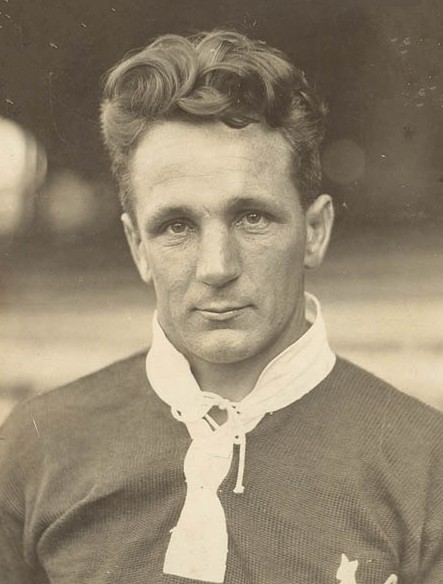
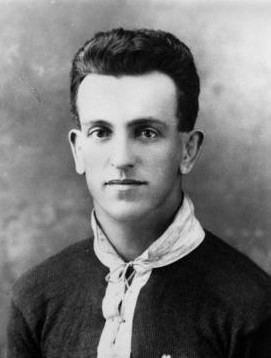
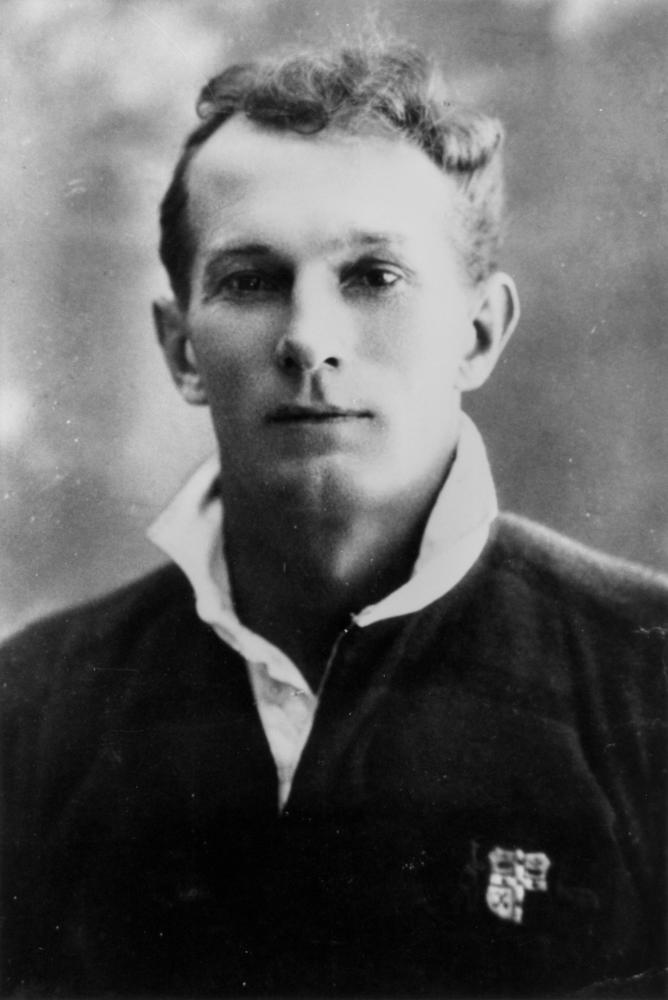
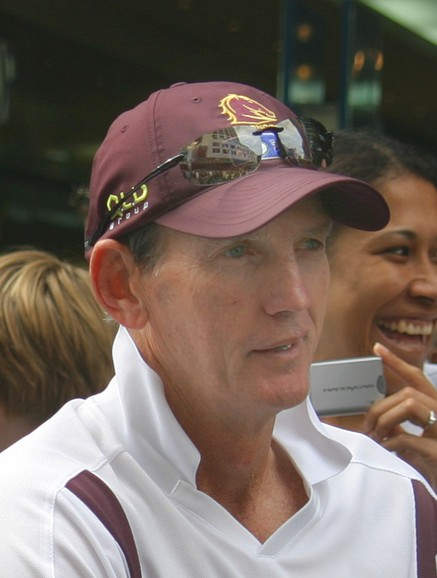
No.	Name		Position^{[A]}	Clubs^{[B]}	Queensland^{[C]}	Australia^{[D]}	Source
1.	Darren Lockyer	born 24 March 1977	Fullback	Brisbane Broncos	31 matches (1997–2009); 29 State of Origin matches 2 Super League matches	50 matches (1997–2009); 37 Test matches 9 World Cup matches 4 Super League matches
2.	Cecil Aynsley	born 1902 died 1975	Wing	Brisbane Wests; Starlights, Ipswich; Rochdale Hornets, England	34 matches (1922–1930); 34 regular matches	4 matches (1924–1928); 4 Test matches
3.	Tom Gorman	born 1 June 1901 died 22 June 1978	Centre	Toowoomba Past Christian Brothers; Brisbane Christian Brothers; Brisbane Past Christian Brothers	43 matches (1920–1930); 43 regular matches	32 matches (1924–1930); 10 Test matches 22 Tour matches
4.	Mal Meninga	born 8 July 1960	Centre	Brisbane Souths; Canberra Raiders	43 matches (1979–1994); 32 State of Origin matches 11 regular games	46 matches (1982–1994); 33 Test matches 13 World Cup matches
5.	Denis Flannery	born 2 April 1928 died 12 February 2012	Wing	Ipswich Brothers	27 matches (1948–1956); 27 regular matches	45 matches (1950–1957); 13 Test matches 2 World Cup matches 30 Tour matches
6.	Wally Lewis (c)	born 1 December 1959	Five-eighth	Fortitude Valley; Wynnum-Manly; Brisbane Broncos; Gold Coast	40 matches 31 State of Origin matches 9 regular games	35 matches 25 Test matches 9 World Cup matches 1 regular match
7.	Allan Langer	born 30 July 1966	Halfback	Ipswich Jets; Brisbane Broncos	38 matches (1987–2002); 34 State of Origin matches 3 Super League match 1 regular match	26 matches (1988–1999); 17 Test matches 7 World Cup matches 1 Super League match 1 regular match
8.	Duncan Hall	born 24 August 1925 died 18 January 2011	Prop	Brisbane Valleys; Toowoomba Brothers; Home Hill; Brisbane Wests	24 matches (1948–1955); 24 regular matches	69 matches (1948–1955); 22 Test matches 1 World Cup match 46 Tour matches
9.	Noel Kelly	born 22 January 1936 died 14 June 2020	Hooker	Ipswich Brothers; Ayr; Sydney Wests; Wollongong	7 matches 7 regular matches	81 matches 25 Test matches 3 World Cup matches 53 Tour matches
10.	Peter Madsen	born 16 September 1901 died 2 February 1979	Prop	Toowoomba Valleys; Toowoomba Brothers; Stanthorpe	41 matches (1928–1937); 41 regular matches	51 matches (1929–1936); 9 Test matches 42 Tour matches
11.	Arthur Beetson	born 22 January 1945 died 1 December 2011	Second-row	Redcliffe; Balmain; Sydney Easts; Parramatta	3 matches (1980–1981); 1 State of Origin match 2 regular matches	28 matches (1966–1977); 14 Test matches 14 World Cup matches
12.	Brian Davies	born 16 May 1930 died 14 November 2012	Second-row	Brisbane Brothers; Canterbury-Bankstown; St. George	38 matches (1950–1958); 38 regular matches	33 matches (1951–1958); 33 Test matches 6 World Cup matches
13.	Bob Lindner	born 10 November 1962	Lock	Brisbane Souths; Wynnum-Manly; Castleford, England; Parramatta Eels; Gold Coast; Western Suburbs Magpies; Illawarra Steelers; Oldham, England	27 matches (1983–1993); 25 State of Origin matches 2 regular matches	24 matches (1986–1993); 15 Test matches 9 World Cup matches
14.	Jimmy Craig	born 1895 died 1959	Reserve	Balmain; Sydney University; Ipswich Starlights; Sydney Wests	33 matches (1923–1928); 33 regular matches	7 matches (1921–1928); 7 Test matches
15.	Duncan Thompson	born 14 March 1895 died 27 May 1980	Reserve	Ipswich St. Pauls; North Sydney; Toowoomba Valleys	17 matches 17 regular matches	35 matches 9 Test matches 26 Tour matches
16.	Gene Miles	born 21 July 1959	Reserve	South Townsville; Wynnum-Manly; Brisbane Broncos	27 matches (1982–1989); 20 State of Origin matches 7 regular matches	14 matches (1983–1988); 10 Test matches 4 World Cup matches
17.	Herb Steinohrt	born 21 October 1899 died 27 December 1985	Reserve	Warra; Toowoomba Valleys	51 matches (1924–1933); 51 regular matches	9 matches (1928–1932); 9 Test matches
Coach^{[E]}	Wayne Bennett	born 1 January 1950		Toowoomba All Whites; Brisbane Souths; Brisbane Brothers; Canberra Raiders; Brisbane Broncos; St. George Illawarra Dragons; Newcastle Knights; Brisbane Broncos; South Sydney Rabbitohs	24 matches (1986–2003) as coach 11 wins 1 draw 12 losses	16 matches (1998–2005) as coach 12 wins 1 draw 3 losses [Redcliffe Dolphins]

== Notes ==
^{A} The position the player were chosen in the Team of the Century.
^{B} The Australian clubs/teams the player played for during his career.
^{C} The number of games he played at state level for Queensland during his career.
^{D} The number of games he played at national level for Australia during his career.
^{E} The Clubs, Queensland and Australia columns are in terms of his coaching career, not his playing career.
