= Billy Dingsdale =

English rugby player (1905–1965)

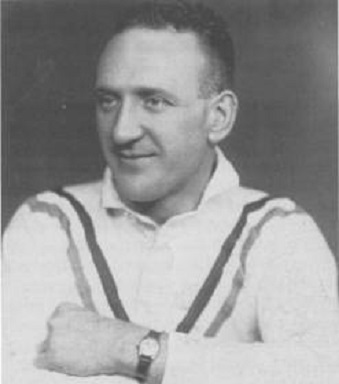

Personal information
- Full name: William Dingsdale
- Born: 1905 Prescot district, England
- Died: 14 September 1965 (aged 60) St. Helens district, England

Playing information
- Weight: 12 st 4 lb (78 kg)
- Position: Centre
Club
Years	Team	Pld	T	G	FG	P
1925–27	Broughton Rangers	79	27	0	0	81
1928–40	Warrington	373	154	4		470
	Total	452	181	4	0	551
Representative
Years	Team	Pld	T	G	FG	P
1928–33	Lancashire	13	5	0	0	15
1928–33	England	7	11	0	0	33
1929–33	Great Britain	3	0	0	0	0

William Dingsdale (1905 – 14 September 1965) was an English rugby league player who played in the 1920s, 1930s and 1940s. He played at representative level for Great Britain, England and Lancashire, and at club level for Broughton Rangers and Warrington, as a centre.

== Background ==
Dingsdale's birth was registered in Prescot district, Lancashire, England, and his death aged 60 was registered in St. Helens district, Lancashire, England.

== Career ==
=== Championship final appearances ===
Dingsdale played in Warrington's 3-14 defeat by Swinton in the Championship Final during the 1934–35 season, and the 11-13 defeat by Salford in the Championship Final during the 1936–37 season.

=== Challenge Cup Final appearances ===
Dingsdale played at centre and scored a try in Warrington's 17-21 defeat by Huddersfield in the 1933 Challenge Cup Final during the 1932–33 season at Wembley Stadium, London on Saturday 6 May 1933, and in the 2-18 defeat by Leeds in the 1936 Challenge Cup Final during the 1935–36 season at Wembley Stadium, London on Saturday 18 April 1936.

=== County League appearances ===
Dingsdale played in Warrington's victory in the Lancashire League during the 1937–38 season.

=== County Cup Final appearances ===
Dingsdale played in Warrington's 15-2 victory over Salford in the 1929 Lancashire Cup Final during the 1929–30 season at Central Park, Wigan on Saturday 23 November 1929, and he played in the 10-9 victory over St. Helens in the 1932 Lancashire Cup Final during the 1932–33 season at Central Park, Wigan on Saturday 19 November 1932, but he did not play in the 8-4 victory over Barrow in the 1937 Lancashire Cup Final during the 1937–38 season at Central Park, Wigan on Saturday 23 October 1937, in front of a crowd of 12,000.

=== Club records ===
During January 1929, within a fortnight, Billy Dingsdale twice scored 4-tries in matches against Bradford Northern, firstly in a 35-7 victory at Bradford Northern, and then in a 65-0 win at Wilderspool Stadium, during the 1928–29 season he also equalled Warrington's "Most Tries In A Season" record with 28-tries, subsequently extended by Steve Ray to 33-tries, and then by Brian Bevan to 48, 57, 60, and lastly to 66-tries.

=== International honours ===
Dingsdale won caps for England while at Warrington in 1928 against Wales, in 1929 against Other Nationalities, in 1930 against Wales, and Other Nationalities, in 1931 against Wales, in 1932 against Wales, in 1933 against Other Nationalities, and won caps for Great Britain while at Warrington in 1929 against Australia (2 matches), and on the 1932 Great Britain Lions tour against Australia.

== Honours ==
Dingsdale is a Warrington Wolves Hall of Fame inductee.

== Family ==
Dingsdale was the younger brother of Tommy Dingsdale, and the older brother of Benjamin Dingsdale.
