= Joe Busch =

Australian RL coach and former Australia international rugby league footballer

Personal information
- Full name: Joseph Busch
- Born: 4 June 1907 Maclean, New South Wales, Australia
- Died: 29 May 1999 (aged 91) Five Dock, New South Wales, Australia

Playing information
- Position: Halfback
Club
Years	Team	Pld	T	G	FG	P
1928–30	Eastern Suburbs	32	11	0	0	33
1931–34	Leeds	137	26	1	0	80
1935–36	Balmain	19	9	0	0	27
	Total	188	46	1	0	140
Representative
Years	Team	Pld	T	G	FG	P
1928–30	New South Wales	15	5	1	0	17
1928–30	Australia	7	0	0	0	0
1931–34	Other Nationalities	1
1928–30	NSW City	3	4	0	0	12

Coaching information
Club
Years	Team	Gms	W	D	L	W%
1935–36	Balmain	29	17	1	11	59

Joe 'Chimpy' Busch (4 June 1907 – 29 May 1999) was an Australian rugby league footballer who played in the 1920s and 1930s. A state and national representative halfback, his club career was played with Sydney-based teams Eastern Suburbs and Balmain, and British team Leeds, in the 1930s. He has been named amongst the nation's finest footballers of the 20th century.

== Life and career ==
Born in the country town of Maclean, New South Wales, in 1907. As a newborn, one of his older brothers remarked that he looked like a chimpanzee and hence he gained the lifelong nickname 'Chimpy'. Busch was a fisherman who played in the local side, Harwood Island. In 1926, at the age of 19, he was spotted by Eastern Suburbs talent scout John 'Dinny' Campbell, and invited to trial for a position in the team. Busch had to borrow the £5 return boat fare to Sydney. Busch trialled for selection with the Eastern Suburbs and was successful, becoming the team's half-back.

In his first year of professional rugby league, Busch was selected for the NSW state representative team and national team, the Kangaroos. Busch played for the Kangaroos against the visiting English national side in 1928 and the following year was also selected for 1929–30 Kangaroo tour of Great Britain.

On the boat trip home to Australia after the 1929–30 Ashes tour of Britain, Busch met and became romantically involved with Josephina (Ina) Castrey, who was emigrating from Scotland to Australia, the pair were eventually married.

Based on his performance in the 1929–30 Kangaroos tour, Busch was offered a position with Yorkshire club, Leeds. Busch's contract included a signing fee of £1,000 and match payments of £7 for a win, £6 for a draw and £5 for a loss. Busch made his début for Leeds against Wigan at Central Park, Wigan on Wednesday 4 March 1931. While playing for Leeds, Busch was selected in the Yorkshire representative team and toured France in 1934. Busch played for Leeds for 5 years until 1935, when he returned to Australia where he took up the position of captain-coach for Balmain. Busch remained at Balmain as coach-captain for 2 years before deciding to retire at the end of the 1936 season.

In 1945, Busch became a selector for the Australian side.

Busch's wife, Ina died in 1996, they had been married more than 65 years. Busch died on 29 May 1999, aged 91. Busch's death left Harry Kadwell as the lone survivor of the 1929–30 Kangaroo tour of Great Britain. Harry "Mick" Kadwell died just under four months later on 27 October 1999, aged 96.

== Notable tries ==
For many years after, fans would talk about a try Busch scored where he took the ball from a scrum, and shot down the blind-side with Souths, and Australian wing, Benny Wearing, in support. As the Queensland defence closed in, Busch held the ball back from Wearing - he dummied to him five times before scoring a brilliant individual try.

Busch with the Kangaroos 1st Test 5 October 1929

Busch played in 6 test matches for Australia in his career; however, it is a controversial no-try incident on that tour that he is best remembered for. England had held the Ashes for almost 20 years, with only a few minutes remaining and the scores locked at nil-all in the third and deciding test at Station Road, Swinton near Manchester, Busch collected the ball from a scrum win 30 metres out and scooted down the sideline. He crashed over the try-line in the corner with Swinton, and England lock Fred Butters on his back making a last-ditch attempt to stop him. As the corner post went flying the crowd spilled onto the field in excitement. Referee Robinson looked set to award Australia the try, and the game (and with it the Ashes) when the touch-judge emerged through the crowd claiming Busch had taken out the corner post before grounding the ball. Even though the referee believed it was a fair try he had no option other than to rule 'no try'. The referee was reported to have said to the Kangaroos "fair try Australia, but I am overruled". The match finished as a 0–0 draw, leaving the series tied at one match apiece, a deciding fourth match was played a week later, which England won 3–0, to retain the Ashes. For the remainder of his life Busch insisted he scored the try, quoted as saying "I got it down all right…it was a fair try." The corner where Busch scored the disallowed try in Swinton is still officially known as Busch's Corner.

== Accolades ==
In 1998, for a rugby league memorabilia auction for charity Busch's 1928 autographed jersey went for A$67,000.

Following his death in 1999, players from the two Australian clubs for which he played, Eastern suburbs and Balmain wore black armbands in his honour.

In February 2008, Busch was named in the list of Australia's 100 Greatest Players (1908–2007) which was commissioned by the NRL and ARL to celebrate the code's centenary year in Australia.

He is listed as Eastern Suburbs player No. 184.

== Sources ==
- RL1908.com - Sean Fagan
- The Encyclopedia Of Rugby League Players; Alan Whiticker & Glen Hudson
