= Fred Laws (rugby league) =

Australian rugby league player

Personal information
- Full name: Frederick Charles Laws
- Born: 30 April 1905 Brisbane, QLD, Australia
- Died: 15 February 1986 (aged 80) Southport, QLD, Australia

Playing information
- Position: Five-eighth / Centre
Representative
Years	Team	Pld	T	G	FG	P
1927–35	Queensland	39	3	3	0	15
1928–33	Australia	7	0	1	0	2

Frederick Charles Laws (30 April 1905 – 15 February 1986) was an Australian rugby league player.

Raised in the Queensland town of Allora, Laws was a centre and five-eighth, known by the moniker "Tiger" on account of his tackling. He captained Newtown in the strong Toowoomba competition and was a Queensland interstate representative from 1927 to 1935. While a member of the national team, Laws featured on two tours of Great Britain, including as vice captain of the 1933–34 touring side. He retired from rugby league in 1936.
