= David Davies (rugby league, born 1902) =

Wales international rugby league footballer

Dai Davies
- Ogden's cigarette card featuring Dai Davies

Personal information
- Full name: David Morgan Davies
- Born: 5 May 1902 Gwaun-Cae-Gurwen, Wales
- Died: 22 February 1992 (aged 89)

Playing information
- Position: Scrum-half
Club
Years	Team	Pld	T	G	FG	P
1926–27	Broughton Rangers	55	6	0	0	18
1927–34	Warrington	196	34	0	0	102
1934–36	Huddersfield	33	2	2	0	10
1936–37	Keighley	35	12	1	0	38
	Total	319	54	3	0	168
Representative
Years	Team	Pld	T	G	FG	P
1928–35	Wales	4	0	0	0	0
1930	Other Nationalities	1	2	0	0	6
1929–34	Rugby League XIII	3	0	0	0	0
1927	Glamorgan	1	0	0	0	0
1929–31	Glamorgan and Monmouthshire	5	0	0	0	0

David "Dai" Morgan Davies (5 May 1902 – 22 February 1992) was a Welsh rugby union and professional rugby league footballer who played in the 1920s and 1930s. He played club level rugby union (RU) for Amman United and Neath and after changing codes to rugby league (RL) he played at international level for Wales and at club level for Broughton Rangers, Warrington, Huddersfield and Keighley, as a scrum-half. Dai Davies was on the losing side in four Challenge Cup finals with three separate clubs; Warrington (1928 and 1933), Huddersfield (1935), and Keighley (1937).

== Playing career ==
Davies played rugby union for Amman United and Neath before changing codes from rugby union to rugby league when he joined Broughton Rangers in 1926. The following year he left Broughton to join Warrington, being paid a signing-on fee of £250, the payment of signing-on fees was widespread but not in accordance with Rugby Football League rules.

Davies remained with Warrington for eight seasons, appearing on the losing side in two Challenge Cup finals, the first the 3–5 defeat by Swinton in the 1928 Challenge Cup Final at Central Park, Wigan in April 1928; in the second he scored two tries in the 17–21 defeat by Huddersfield in the 1933 Challenge Cup Final at Wembley Stadium, London on 6 May 1933, a game in which Davies scoring two tries. He did win one trophy scoring a try in Warrington's 10–9 victory over St.Helens in the 1932 Lancashire Cup Final during the 1932–33 season at Central Park, Wigan on Saturday 19 November 1932.

In 1934 Davies joined Huddersfield for whom he appeared in a third Challenge Cup final as Huddersfield lost 8–11 to Castleford in the 1935 Challenge Cup Final at Wembley on 4 May 1935, in front of a crowd of 39,000,

Davies moved to Keighley in August 1936 for a fee of £200, and captaining the team in their only Challenge Cup final to date, a 5–18 defeat by Widnes in the 1937 Challenge Cup Final at Wembley on Saturday 8 May 1937, in front of a crowd of 47,699.

The Challenge Cup final appearance for Keighley was Davies' last game, despite an offer to join Newcastle, he decided to retire from a playing career and became a coach for the Warrington Junior Rugby League, a post he held until the Second World War.

The record of playing in four Challenge Cup finals and being on the losing team in all of them was an unwanted record that Davies held until Paul Loughlin played in five losing finals in the 1980s and 1990s.

=== International honours ===
At international level Davies won four caps for Wales (RL) from 1928 to 1935 while at Warrington. He also appeared once for the Other Nationalities (RL) in a 35–19 victory over England at Thrum Hall, Halifax in 1930, a game in which he scored two tries as well as three appearances for the Rugby League XIII between 1929 and 1934.

Appearances for Great Britain eluded him. He played in two trial matches for the 1932 tour to Australia and New Zealand but he was not picked for the touring squad.

=== County honours ===
David Davies played scrum-half in Glamorgan's 18–14 victory over Monmouthshire in the non-County Championship match during the 1926–27 season at Taff Vale Park, Pontypridd on Saturday 30 April 1927.

Davies made five appearances for the Glamorgan, later Glamorgan and Monmouthshire, county teams in the County Championship and one game for the county against Australia.

== Later life ==
Having left school aged 14, Davies had started his working career in the collieries of his native South Wales and throughout his rugby career held other jobs to supplement his rugby payments. After leaving the game during the Second World War he returned to Wales and resumed a career as a pitman. After the war he ran a public house in Warrington while also working as part of the Warrington club's coaching staff. A final return to Wales in 1952 followed and for the remainder of his working life he worked in the pits.

Davies married Katie Rees (1909–1985) in 1932 and they had two children. Dai Davies died in 1992, aged 89.

== Notes ==
=== Sources ===
- Collins, Tony (2006). Rugby League in Twentieth Century Britain. Routledge. ISBN 978-0415396158.
- Lund, Brian (1997). Daring to Dream: The story of Keighley Cougars. ISBN 1-900138-24-7.
- Melling, Phil (1994). Man of Amman: The Life of Dai Davies. Gomez. ISBN 1-85902-083-6.
- Slater, Gary (2012). The Warrington Wolves Miscellany. ISBN 978-075249-025-0.
- Williams, Graham; Lush, Peter; Farrar, David (2009). The British Rugby League Records Book. London League. ISBN 978-1-903659-49-6.
