= Nat Bentham =

GB & England international rugby league footballer

Personal information
- Full name: Nathan Bentham
- Born: 8 March 1900; Wigan, Lancashire
- Died: 9 April 1975 (aged 75); Wigan, Lancashire

Playing information
- Position: Hooker
Club
Years	Team	Pld	T	G	FG	P
1925–28	Wigan Highfield	105	5	0	0	15
1928–29	Halifax	43	1	12	0	27
1930–35	Warrington	200	2	0	0	6
	Total	348	8	12	0	48
Representative
Years	Team	Pld	T	G	FG	P
1928–30	England	5	0	3	0	6
1928–30	Great Britain	10	0	0	0	0
1927–30	Lancashire	10	0	0	0	0

Nathan "Nat" Bentham (8 March 1900 – 9 April 1975) was an English professional rugby league footballer who played in the 1920s and 1930s. He played at representative level for Great Britain and England, and at club level for Wigan Highfield, Halifax and Warrington, as a hooker.

== Club career ==
Bentham started his career at Wigan Highfield. Due to the club's financial problems, he was transferred to Halifax during November 1928. He was transferred to Warrington for a fee of £400 during January 1930.

== International honours ==
Nat Bentham won caps for England while at Wigan Highfield in 1928 against Wales (2 matches), while at Halifax in 1929 against Other Nationalities, while at Warrington in 1930 against Other Nationalities (2 matches), and won caps for Great Britain while at Wigan Highfield in 1928 against Australia (3 matches), and New Zealand (3 matches), while at Halifax in 1929-30 against Australia (2 matches), and while at Warrington against Australia (2 matches).

Bentham was the only Great Britain player to retain his position (hooker) for every game of the unprecedented 4-test Ashes series of the 1929–30 Kangaroo tour of Great Britain.
