= Jack Oster =

GB & England international rugby league footballer

John Oster
Personal information
- Full name: John Joseph Oster
- Born: 23 May 1902; Wigan, Lancashire, England
- Died: 10 July 1956 (aged 54); Wigan, Lancashire, England

Playing information
- Position: Stand-off
Club
Years	Team	Pld	T	G	FG	P
1925–27	Wigan Highfield	53	16	6	0	60
1927–32	Oldham	189	67	6		213
1932–33	Warrington	40	4	0	2	16
1933–34	London Highfield	18	1	2	0	7
1934–35	Liverpool Stanley	20	1	0	0	3
1935	Bradford Northern	13	3	0	0	9
	Total	333	92	14	2	308
Representative
Years	Team	Pld	T	G	FG	P
1929	England	1	0	0	0	0
1930	Great Britain	1	0	0	0	0
1929	Northern League XIII	2	1	0	0	3
1930	Lancashire	1	2	0	0	6

John Joseph Oster (23 May 1902 – 10 July 1956) was an English professional rugby league footballer who played in the 1920s and 1930s. He played at representative level for Great Britain and England, and at club level for Wigan Highfield/London Highfield/Liverpool Stanley, Oldham, Warrington, and Bradford Northern, as a stand-off.

== Playing career ==
=== Club career ===
Oster made his début for Warrington on Saturday 27 August 1932, and he played his last match for Warrington on Saturday 9 September 1933.

Oster played stand-off in Warrington's 17-21 defeat by Huddersfield in the 1933 Challenge Cup Final during the 1932–33 season at Wembley Stadium, London on Saturday 6 May 1933, in front of a crowd of 41,784.

In 1936, he signed with French club Racing Club Albigeois.

=== International honours ===
Oster won a cap for England while at Oldham in the 27-20 victory over Other Nationalities at Headingley, Leeds on Wednesday 20 March 1929, and won a cap for Great Britain while at Oldham in the 0-0 draw with Australia in the 1929–30 Kangaroo tour of Great Britain match at Station Road, Swinton on Saturday 4 January 1930.
