= Jim Craig (rugby league) =

Australian RL coach and former Australia international rugby league footballer

Jimmy Craig
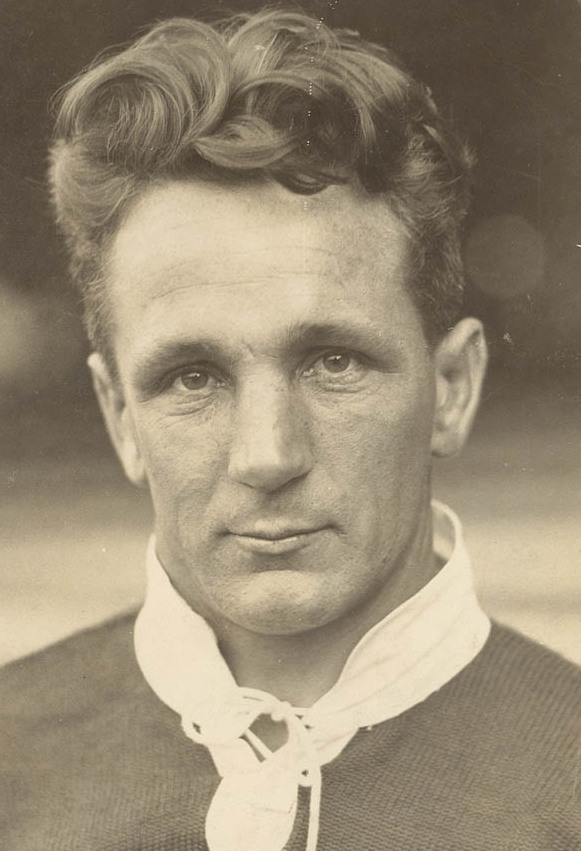
- Craig as captain of a 1924 Queensland side

Personal information
- Full name: James Hampden Craig
- Born: 29 June 1895 Sydney, New South Wales, Australia
- Died: 13 December 1959 (aged 64) Ashfield, New South Wales, Australia

Playing information
- Position: Utility back
Club
Years	Team	Pld	T	G	FG	P
1915–21	Balmain	56	22	21	0	108
1922	Sydney University	12	3	7	0	23
1923–28	Ipswich
1929–30	Western Suburbs	25	5	70	0	155
	Total	93	30	98	0	286
Representative
Years	Team	Pld	T	G	FG	P
1920–29	New South Wales	2	0	3	0	6
1923–28	Queensland	18	6	29	0	76
1921–28	Australia	7	0	6	0	12

Coaching information
Club
Years	Team	Gms	W	D	L	W%
1929–30	Western Suburbs	65	39	4	22	60
1932	Western Suburbs
1936	North Sydney	13	7	1	5	54
1938	Canterbury	16	13	2	1	81
1939	Western Suburbs
	Total	94	59	7	28	63

Jim Craig (1895–1959) was an Australian rugby league footballer and coach. He was a versatile back for the Australian national team. He played in seven tests between 1921 and 1928 as captain on three occasions and has since been named amongst the nation's finest footballers of the 20th century. Craig was a player of unparalleled versatility. It is known that he represented in Tests at fullback, centre, halfback and hooker with some of his club and tour football played at winger, five-eighth and lock forward. Whiticker's reference reports that the great Dally Messenger regarded Craig as the greatest player Messenger ever saw.

== Early years ==
Craig grew up in Balmain in Sydney and played as a junior for the local club.

== Playing career ==
=== 1910s ===
Craig made his first grade NSWRFL Premiership debut as a winger in 1915 with the Balmain club. He played at centre for Balmain in the 1916 NSWRFL season's premiership final victory over South Sydney. Craig played five seasons with the club excluding 1918 when he was on military duty. Balmain won the premiership in all five of those years. Craig's versatility was such that he was selected at hooker for a match on tour of New Zealand in 1919.

=== 1920s ===
Graig first represented for New South Wales against a touring English side in 1920. He was selected on the 1921–22 Kangaroo tour of Great Britain and made his test debut in the first test at Leeds. He appeared in 23 minor tour matches notching a total of 58 points as a try scorer and goal kicker. Following his Kangaroo Tour representative appearances in 1922 he played a season with the University club in Sydney.

In 1923 Craig relocated to Queensland and took the captain-coach position with Ipswich for the next six seasons. While a Queensland resident from 1923 to 1928 he represented that state on twenty-three occasions and then in 1929 he twice again represented for New South Wales.

In the 1924 domestic Ashes series against England Craig was named as Australian captain in all three tests. Again in 1928 he played in all three tests of the domestic Ashes series in sides led by his Queensland rival Tom Gorman.

The last two seasons of Craig's sixteen-year career were with the Western Suburbs Magpies. Craig was the NSWRL's top points scorer in seasons 1929 and 1930. He was captain-coach of the side to their maiden title over St George in season 1930 in the first ever Grand Final played to determine the premiership.

== Post-playing ==
After football Jim Craig coached Western Suburbs in 1932 and 1939 and North Sydney in 1936. He coached Canterbury-Bankstown to win the Premiership in 1938.

Craig died on 13 December 1959, aged 64.

In 2005 he was admitted into the Australian Rugby League Hall of Fame. In February 2008, Craig was named in the list of Australia's 100 Greatest Players (1908–2007) which was commissioned by the NRL and ARL to celebrate the code's centenary year in Australia. In June 2008, he was chosen in the Queensland Rugby League's Team of the Century on interchange bench. In 2012 Craig was inducted into the Queensland Sport Hall of Fame.

== Sources ==
- Whiticker, Alan (2004) Captaining the Kangaroos, New Holland, Sydney
- Andrews, Malcolm (2006) The ABC of Rugby League Austn Broadcasting Corpn, Sydney
- Queensland Team of the Century named – article at nz.leagueunlimited.com

Sporting positions
Preceded by Chook Fraser	Captain Australia; 1924	Succeeded by Tom Gorman
