= William Brogan =

Australian RL coach and former Australia international rugby league footballer

Personal information
- Full name: William Henry Joseph Brogan
- Born: 28 April 1900 West Wyalong, New South Wales,
- Died: 6 March 1983 (aged 82) Earlwood, New South Wales

Playing information
Club
Years	Team	Pld	T	G	FG	P
1929–33	Western Suburbs	64	8	6	0	36
Representative
Years	Team	Pld	T	G	FG	P
1929–32	New South Wales	11	3	1		6
1929–30	Australia	3	0	0	0	0

Coaching information
Club
Years	Team	Gms	W	D	L	W%
1933	Western Suburbs	14	4	1	9	29
- Source: Whiticker/Hudson.

William Henry Joseph Brogan (28 April 1900 – 6 March 1983) was an Australian rugby league footballer who played in the 1920s and 1930s. He was a state and national representative.

== Background ==
Brogan was born at West Wyalong, New South Wales, on 28 April 1900.

== Playing career ==
He joined Western Suburbs Magpies in 1929, and after a stirling season, he was selected on the 1929/30 Kangaroo Tour and played in all three tests against England.

Brogan is listed on the Australian Players Register as Kangaroo No.151. Brogan spent five years at Wests between 1929 and 1933 and won a premiership with them in 1930. Brogan also made 11 appearances for New South Wales.

== Coaching career ==
He retired from Sydney football in 1933 to captain-coach Warialda and Moree Rugby Leagues clubs.

Kangaroos 1st Test 1929.

== Death ==
Brogan died at Earlwood, New South Wales, on 6 March 1983, aged 83.
