= Jack Kingston (rugby league) =

Australia international rugby league player

Personal information
- Full name: Charles John Kingston
- Born: 29 January 1908 Cootamundra, NSW, Australia
- Died: 29 January 1957 (aged 49) Mid North Coast, NSW, Australia

Playing information
- Position: Forward
Club
| Years | Team | Pld | T | G | FG | P |
|---|---|---|---|---|---|---|
| 1935 | Western Suburbs | 3 | 0 | 0 | 0 | 0 |
Representative
| Years | Team | Pld | T | G | FG | P |
| 1928–34 | New South Wales | 23 | 12 | 0 | 0 | 36 |
| 1928–30 | Australia | 4 | 0 | 0 | 0 | 0 |

Charles John Kingston (29 January 1908 – 29 January 1957) was an Australian rugby league player.

== Rugby league ==
Raised in Cootamundra, Kingston played most of his rugby league in country New South Wales. He featured in four Test matches for Australia, making his debut as a second-rower against Great Britain at the Sydney Cricket Ground in 1928. His other Test appearances came during the 1929–30 tour of Great Britain, where he was Australia's top try-scoring forward across all tour fixtures. In 1935, Kingston competed in first-grade with the Western Suburbs Magpies, but left four rounds into the season to be playing-coach of Werris Creek.

== Personal life ==
Kingston managed the Victoria Hotel in Nambucca Heads in his later life. He died at the age of 49 in 1957, having collapsing at the wheel of his car while driving his children to school. The children were unharmed as his wife was able to take control of the vehicle.
