= Candy Evans =

Wales dual-code rugby footballer and boxer

Personal information
- Full name: Arthur Evans
- Born: 18 November 1903 Abersychan district, Wales
- Died: 7 January 1952 (aged 48) Abersychan, Wales

Playing information

Rugby union
- Position: Lock
Club
Years	Team	Pld	T	G	FG	P
≤1924–≥24	Pontypool RFC
Representative
Years	Team	Pld	T	G	FG	P
1924	Wales	3	0	0	0

Rugby league
- Position: Hooker, Second-row
Club
Years	Team	Pld	T	G	FG	P
1924–29	Halifax
1929–30	Leeds
1930–31	Castleford	18	1			3
1931–34	Warrington	109	21	0		63
1934–35	Halifax
1937–38	Leigh	3	0	0	0	0
	Total	130	22	0	0	66
Representative
Years	Team	Pld	T	G	FG	P
≤1931–≥31	Glamorgan County	≥2
1928–33	Wales	4

Arthur "Candy" Evans (18 November 1903 – 7 January 1952) was a Welsh boxer, dual-code international rugby union, and professional rugby league footballer who played in the 1920s and 1930s. He played representative level rugby union (RU) for Wales, and at club level for Pontypool RFC, as a lock, and representative level rugby league (RL) for Wales, Glamorgan County RLFC, and at club level for Halifax, Leeds, Castleford, Warrington, and Leigh, as a hooker, or second-row.

== Background ==
Candy Evans' birth was registered in Abersychan district, Wales, he was a coal miner, on his retirement from boxing and rugby he became a professional gambler, facing substantial debts, he committed suicide aged 48 in Abersychan, Wales.

== Rugby union ==
Evans won caps for Wales (RU) while at Pontypool RFC in the 1924 Five Nations Championship against England, Ireland, and France,

== Rugby league ==
=== Club career ===
Evans played in Warrington's 17-21 defeat by Huddersfield in the 1933 Challenge Cup Final during the 1932–33 season at Wembley Stadium, London, in front of a crowd of 41,784.

=== Representative honours ===
Evans won 4 caps for Wales (RL) in 1928–1933 while at Halifax, Leeds, Castleford in the 19–23 defeat by England at Fartown Ground, Huddersfield on Wednesday 18 March 1931, and Warrington.

Evans won caps playing at second-row for Glamorgan County RLFC while at Castleford in the 19–12 victory over Cumberland at Recreation Ground, Whitehaven on Saturday 21 March 1931, and 12–33 defeat by Yorkshire at Thrum Hall, Halifax on Wednesday 15 April 1931.

== Boxing ==
Evans was also a boxer, one year going straight from a Welsh rugby union international against Ireland to compete in, and win, the Welsh amateur boxing championship hours later. He later became a professional boxer, though remained better known for his rugby achievements.
