= Herb Steinohrt =

Australian RL coach and former Australia international rugby league footballer

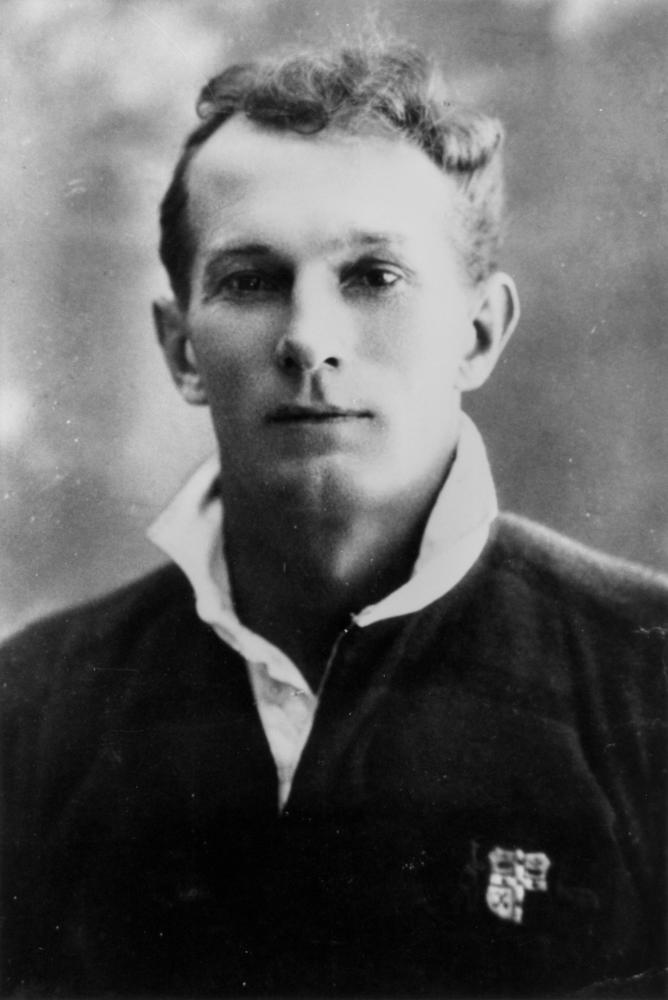
- Steinohrt in 1925

Personal information
- Full name: Herbert Walter Steinohrt
- Born: 21 October 1899 Pittsworth, Queensland, Australia
- Died: 27 December 1985 (aged 86) Toowoomba, Queensland, Australia

Playing information
- Height: 188 cm (6 ft 2 in)
- Weight: 89 kg (196 lb; 14 st 0 lb)
- Position: Forward
Club
Years	Team	Pld	T	G	FG	P
1922–33	Valleys (Toowoomba)
Representative
Years	Team	Pld	T	G	FG	P
	Toowoomba	59	24
1925–33	Queensland	51				21
1928–32	Australia	9	0	0	0	0

Coaching information
Representative
Years	Team	Gms	W	D	L	W%
1946	Queensland	0	0	0	0

Herbert Walt Steinohrt (21 October 1897 – 27 December 1985) was an Australian rugby league footballer who played in the 1920s and 1930s as a front row forward for the Australian national team. He played in 9 Tests between 1928 and 1932 as captain on 3 occasions. He has been widely regarded as one of the greatest forwards in rugby league history, being named in the "Queensland Rugby League's Team of the Century", Australian rugby league's 100 greatest players and Toowoomba and South West Team of the Century. Steinohrt was terrific on and off the field, he never lost his temper and was a smart tactician who never played the same game twice. The Valleys Roosters in the Toowoomba Rugby League Competition home ground is named Herb Stenohrt Oval in his honour.

== Background ==
Steinohrt was born in Pittsworth, Queensland in 1899, but was of German descent. He and his ten brothers and sisters were born to German farmer, Peter Frederick Mathias Steinohrt and mother Wilhelmina, née Schemioneck. As a child he was very sporty, having played rugby union, Australian football, cricket, golf, tennis and when he turned 19 switched to rugby league. He had to ride 39 km on a horse to play for Warra on bad quality fields. Later Steinohrt moved to Toowoomba because he was invited to play in the Toowoomba Rugby League (TRL), to play for the Toowoomba Clydesdales, while working for a local sawmill. He was incredibly loyal to the Clydesdales and was a versatile player having originally played as centre or wing, before switching to the forwards as prop, but could also play second-row or lock.

== Club career ==
Steinohrt’s father had emigrated to Australia in the late 19th century. He was graded by the Valleys club of the Toowoomba rugby League in 1922 as a centre but soon moved to the forwards. He was known throughout his career for his uncompromising heavy tackling style. Along with his 1928 Kangaroo captain Tom Gorman, Steinohrt was a member of the 1924-25 world class Toowoomba side that beat all comers including Sydney premiers Souths, Brisbane, Ipswich and representative sides including New South Wales, Victoria, Great Britain and New Zealand.

== Queensland representative career ==
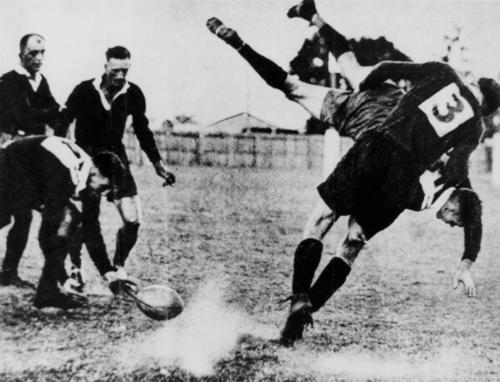
Herb Steinohrt tackling a Brisbane player in the Bulimba Cup

Although he did not first represent his State till age 26, from 1925 to 1933 he had an uninterrupted run as a Queensland Maroon representative, setting the then record of playing 30 consecutive interstate matches. In 1931 and 1932 he captained Queensland to series victories over NSW. In 1933 he was part of a Queensland squad that included the entire Toowoomba representative team and Steinohrt lead a "Clydesdales XIII" against NSW. His brother Arch was also part of this team.

== Australian representative career ==
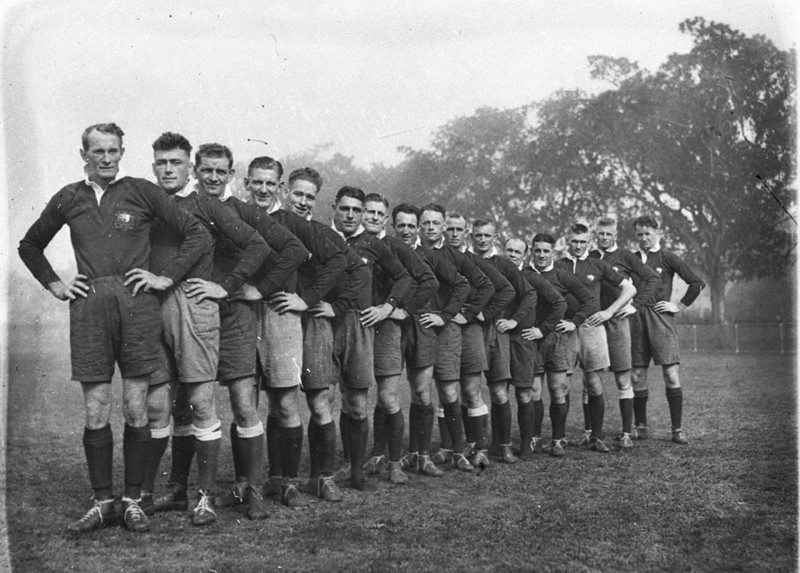
Steinohrt 1st in line, Kangaroo captain, 1st Test Jun1932

Aged 29 in 1928 Herb was selected to play for the Australian team. He played in all 3 games of each of the three consecutive Test series against Great Britain in 1928, 1929–30 and 1932. On the 1929–30 Kangaroo tour of Great Britain he played in 3 Tests and 18 other Tour matches. In 1932 at home against the visiting English he captained the Kangaroos in all three Tests. Steinohrt was the last Queensland based player to captain a Kangaroo Tour until Wally Lewis did so in 1986.

== Post-playing career ==
He retired from representative football in 1932 but continued playing for Valleys and Toowoomba until 1936 including a match for the Clydesdales against the touring 1936 Lions where Toowoomba were narrowly beaten 10–8. He coached Toowoomba and various Queensland representative sides into the 1970s and was a selector for the Australian test team in 1946.

After rugby league, Steinohrt went into real estate.

In February 2008, Steinohrt was named in the list of Australia's 100 Greatest Players (1908–2007) which was commissioned by the NRL and ARL to celebrate the code's centenary year in Australia. In June 2008, he was chosen in the Queensland Rugby League's Team of the Century on interchange bench. In 2008, rugby league in Australia's centenary year, Steinohrt was named at front row forward in the Toowoomba and South West Team of the Century.

== Representative matches played ==
Team	Matches	Years
Queensland v NSW	34	1925–1933
Queensland v Int'ls	9	1925–1932

== Sources ==
- Whiticker, Alan (2004) Captaining the Kangaroos, New Holland, Sydney
- Andrews, Malcolm (2006) The ABC of Rugby League Austn Broadcasting Corpn, Sydney

== Footnotes ==
Sporting positions
Preceded by	Coach Queensland; 1946	Succeeded by Fred Gilbert; 1951
Preceded by Tom Gorman	Captain Australia; 1932	Succeeded by Frank McMillan
