= Fred Butters =

GB & England international rugby league footballer

Personal information
- Full name: Frederick A. Butters
- Born: 3 July 1904 Pendlebury, Lancashire, England
- Died: 16 August 1988 (aged 84)

Playing information
- Position: Loose forward
Club
Years	Team	Pld	T	G	FG	P
1927–40	Swinton	351	69	0	0	207
Representative
Years	Team	Pld	T	G	FG	P
1928–36	Lancashire	15	3	0	0	9
1929–30	Great Britain	2	0	0	0	0
1932	England	1	0	0	0	0

Frederick A. Butters (1904–1988) was an English professional rugby league footballer who played in the 1920s and 1930s. He played at representative level for Great Britain and England, and at club level for Swinton, as a loose forward.

== Background ==
Fred Butters was born in Pendlebury, Lancashire, England, and he died aged 84.

== Playing career ==
=== Swinton ===
Fred Butters played loose forward in Swinton's 8–10 defeat by Salford in the 1931 Lancashire Cup Final during the 1931–32 season at The Cliff, Broughton, Salford on Saturday 21 November 1931.

=== International honours ===
Fred Butters, won a cap for England while at Swinton in 1932 against Wales, and won caps for Great Britain while at Swinton in 1929–30 against Australia (2 matches). He was selected for the 1932 Great Britain Lions tour, but made only one appearance before suffering an ankle injury which kept him out of the rest of the tour.
