= Tom Gorman (rugby league) =

Australia international rugby league footballer

Personal information
- Full name: John Thomas Gorman
- Born: 1 June 1901 Charters Towers, Queensland, Australia
- Died: 22 June 1978 (aged 77) Brisbane, Queensland, Australia

Playing information
- Height: 173 cm (5 ft 8 in)
- Weight: 74 kg (11 st 9 lb)
Club
Years	Team	Pld	T	G	FG	P
1918–25	Brothers (Toowoomba)
1926–28	Christian Brothers (Brisbane)
1929–30	Past Brothers (Brisbane)
	Total	0	0	0	0	0
Representative
Years	Team	Pld	T	G	FG	P
1921–30	Queensland	34	7	0	0	21
1924–30	Australia	10	0	0	0	0

John Thomas Gorman (1 June 1901 – 22 June 1978) was an Australian rugby league footballer. He was a centre for the Australian national team. He played in 10 Tests between 1924 and 1930 as captain on 7 occasions.

== Early life ==
Born in Charters Towers, Queensland, Gorman was the first Queenslander to lead a Kangaroo touring side to Britain. He has been named amongst the nation's finest footballers of the 20th century

== Club career ==
As an old boy of St Mary's Christian Brothers College Toowoomba, Gorman first played for the Past Christian Brothers Football Club in 1918 when the club was still playing rugby union. The Toowoomba Rugby Union affiliated with rugby league in 1919 and he played with Brothers and the Toowoomba Clydesdales representative side from 1919 until 1925. In 1924–25, alongside Herb Steinohrt he was in the Toowoomba sides which beat all comers including Sydney premiers Souths, Brisbane, Ipswich and visiting representative sides including New South Wales, Victoria, Great Britain and New Zealand.

He moved to the Christian Brothers Football Club in Brisbane in 1926 becoming the club's first professional player. He played five seasons in Brisbane till the end of the 1930 season. Gorman played with the Christian Brothers Football Club from 1926 to 1928 and was one of the co-founders of the Past Brothers RLFC and played with them from 1929 to 1930.

== Queensland representative career ==
Gorman debuted for Queensland in 1921. He played in the champion Queensland teams that defeated New South Wales in five consecutive interstate series (1922–1926).

He captained Queensland to a series win over New South Wales in 1928, then through to his last playing season in 1930.

== Australian representative career ==
Gorman (middle centre), Kangaroo captain, before 1st Test, October 1929

Gorman made his Test debut against England in the 1924 Ashes series as one of seven Queenslanders to appear in the 1st Test. From 1924 to 1930 he appeared in ten consecutive Ashes tests.

His first appearance as captain in the 1st test loss to Great Britain in Brisbane in 1928 marked the first occasion that the Kangaroos wore jerseys of green and gold. Previously they had worn the merged blue and maroon colours of NSW and Queensland. Gorman was the first Queenslander to be named captain of a touring side when he was announced as Australian captain for the 1929–30 Kangaroo tour of Great Britain. He is listed on the Australian Players Register as Kangaroo No. 130.

== Later life ==
In retirement, Gorman went into the hotel business in Brisbane. He served the Queensland Rugby League as an administrator.

Gorman died in 1978 and was buried in Nudgee Cemetery.

== Legacy ==
In 2007, Gorman was inducted into the Australian Rugby League Hall of Fame. In February 2008, Gorman was named in the list of Australia's 100 Greatest Players (1908–2007) which was commissioned by the NRL and ARL to celebrate the code's centenary year in Australia. In June 2008, he was chosen in the Queensland Rugby League's Team of the Century at centre.

In 2008, rugby league in Australia's centenary year, Gorman was named at centre in the Toowoomba and South West Team of the Century.

== Sources ==
- Whiticker, Alan (2004) Captaining the Kangaroos, New Holland, Sydney
- Andrews, Malcolm (2006) The ABC of Rugby League Austn Broadcasting Corpn, Sydney
- Alan Whiticker & Glen Hudson (1995). The Encyclopedia of Rugby League Players (with Queensland Section). Smithfield, New South Wales: Gary Allen Pty Ltd. p. 512. ISBN 978-1-877082-93-1.
- Thomas Gorman at the Sport Australia Hall of Fame
- Tom Gorman at nqsports.com.au

Preceded by Jim Craig	Australian national rugby league captain 1928–30	Succeeded by Herb Steinohrt
