= Steve Ray (rugby league) =

Wales international rugby league footballer

Personal information
- Full name: Stephen Ray
- Born: second ¼ 1906 Newport district, Wales
- Died: Unknown

Playing information
- Position: Wing
Club
| Years | Team | Pld | T | G | FG | P |
|---|---|---|---|---|---|---|
| 1928–31 | Wakefield Trinity | 93 | 53 | 0 | 0 | 159 |
| 1932–33 | Warrington | 64 | 45 | 0 | 0 | 135 |
| 1934–36 | Oldham | 18 | 8 | 0 | 0 | 24 |
| | Total | 175 | 106 | 0 | 0 | 318 |
Representative
| Years | Team | Pld | T | G | FG | P |
| 1930–32 | Wales | 2 | 1 | 0 | 0 | 3 |

Stephen Ray (second ¼ 1906 – death unknown) was a Welsh professional rugby league footballer who played in the 1920s and 1930s. He played at representative level for Wales, and at club level for Wakefield Trinity, Warrington and Oldham RLFC, as a wing.

== Background ==
Steve Ray's birth was registered in Newport district, Wales

== Playing career ==
=== International honours ===
Steve Ray won 2 caps for Wales in 1930–1932 while at Wakefield Trinity, and Warrington.

=== Club career ===
Steve Ray made his début for Wakefield Trinity during November 1928, and he played his last match for Wakefield Trinity during November 1931, he made his début for Warrington on Saturday 30 January 1932, and he played his last match for Warrington on Saturday 30 December 1933.

=== Club records ===
Steve Ray set Warrington's "Most Tries In A Season" record with 33 tries in 44 matches during the 1932–33 season, this was subsequently extended by Brian Bevan to 48, 57, 60, and finally 66-tries.
