= 1935 Kangaroo tour of New Zealand =

1935 rugby league tour

The 1935 Kangaroo Tour of New Zealand was the second full tour of New Zealand by the Australia national rugby league team. The Australians played six matches on tour, including a three test series against the New Zealand national rugby league team. The tour began on 21 September and finished on 9 October.

== Leadership ==
The tour captain of the 20 man squad to New Zealand was Eastern Subrbs point scoring centre Dave Brown.

== Touring squad ==
* Tests and (as sub) included in games total.

Player	Club	Position(s)	Games (as sub)	Tests (as sub)	Tries	Goals	F/Goals	Points
Henry Bichel	Ipswich (Qld)	Prop	1	–	1	0	0	3
Dave Brown (c)	Eastern Suburbs	Centre	6	3	12	24	0	84
Edward Collins	North Brisbane (Qld)	Second-row	1	–	0	0	0	0
Frank Curran	South Sydney	Prop	5	3	3	0	0	9
Percy Fairall	St George	Hooker	5	3	2	0	0	6
Jim Gibbs	South Newcastle	Second-row	2	1	2	0	0	6
Fred Gilbert	Toowoomba (Qld)	Halfback	1	–	1	0	0	3
Sid Goodwin	Balmain	Wing	4	3	3	0	0	9
Ray Hines	Western Suburbs	Wing	5	3	3	0	0	9
Eric Lewis	South Sydney	Second-row	3	2	0	0	0	0
Bill Mahon	Toowoomba (Qld)	Wing, Centre	4	1	3	0	0	9
Ross McKinnon	Eastern Suburbs	Centre	5	2	2	0	0	6
Ernie Norman	Eastern Suburbs	Five-eighth	5	3	1	0	0	3
Joe Pearce	Eastern Suburbs	Second-row	5	3	0	0	0	0
Wally Prigg	Central Newcastle	Lock	6	3	1	0	0	3
Mick Shields	Quirindi Grasshoppers	Hooker	1	–	0	0	0	0
Ray Stehr	Eastern Suburbs	Prop	6	3	1	0	0	3
Viv Thicknesse	Eastern Suburbs	Halfback, Five-eighth	6	3	0	0	0	0
Laurie Ward	Maitland United	Fullback	5	3	0	0	0	0
Gordon Whittle	Toowoomba Newtown (Qld)	Fullback	1	–	0	0	0	0

== Tour ==
21 September 1935

Auckland	8 – 16	Australia
Tries: Ted Mincham, Bill Telford; Goals: Ted Mincham (1)	Report	Tries: Dave Brown (2), Frank Curran, Jim Gibbs; Goals: Dave Brown (2)

Carlaw Park, Auckland
Attendance: 15,000
Referee: Maurice Wetherill

Auckland: Bert Cooke (c), Lou Brown, Ted Mincham, Arthur Kay, C. Hall, Stan Prentice, Roy Powell, Lou Hutt, S. Quirke, Bill Telford, Jim Laird, Cliff Satherley, Harold Tetley. Reserves – . Coach –

Australia: Laurie Ward, Ray Hines, Dave Brown (c), Ross McKinnon, Bill Mahon, Ernie Norman, Viv Thicknesse, Frank Curran, Percy Fairall, Ray Stehr, Jim Gibbs, Joe Pearce, Wally Prigg. Reserves –

25 September 1935

New Zealand XIII	31 – 47	Australia
Tries: Coutts (2), Cliff Hunt (2), R. Moisley, Reg Ward, Yule; Goals: Herb Lilburne (5)	Report	Tries: Dave Brown (4), Bill Mahon (3), Henry Bichel, Fred Gilbert, Sid Goodwin, Wally Prigg; Goals: Dave Brown (7)

Hāwera Showgrounds, Hāwera
Referee: V. Simpson

New Zealand XIII: Elliot, Preeble, Cliff Hunt (c), S. Atkins, R. Smith, Herb Lilburne, A. O'Connor, R. Moisley, Reg Ward, Coutts, Gunn, Yule, Serra. Reserves – . Coach –

Australia: Gordon Whittle, Sid Goodwin, Dave Brown (c), Ross McKinnon, Bill Mahon, Viv Thicknesse, Fred Gilbert, Henry Bichel, Mick Shields, Ray Stehr, Edward Collins, Eric Lewis, Wally Prigg. Reserves –

=== First test ===
28 September 1935

New Zealand	22 – 14	Australia
Tries: Lou Brown (3); Bill Glynn; Lou Hutt; Arthur Kay; Goals: Cliff Satherley (2)		Tries: Dave Brown; Sid Goodwin; Goals: Dave Brown (4)

Carlaw Park, Auckland
Attendance: 20,000
Referee: Maurice Wetherill

New Zealand	Position	Australia
Bert Cooke (c)	FB	Laurie Ward
Lou Brown	WG	Sid Goodwin
Ted Mincham	CE	Bill Mahon
George Tittleton	CE	Dave Brown (c)
Arthur Kay	WG	Ray Hines
Stan Prentice	FE	Ernie Norman
Roy Powell	HB	Viv Thicknesse
Harold Tetley	PR	Frank Curran
Cliff Satherley	HK	Percy Fairall
Bill Glynn	PR	Ray Stehr
Jim Laird	SR	Jim Gibbs
Lou Hutt	SR	Joe Pearce
Jim Calder	LF	Wally Prigg
	Coach

=== Second test ===
2 October 1935

New Zealand	8 – 29	Australia
Tries: Cliff Hunt; Cliff Satherley; Goals: Cliff Satherley (1)		Tries: Dave Brown (2); Percy Fairall (2); Ray Hines (2); Ray Stehr; Goals: Dave Brown (4)

Carlaw Park, Auckland
Attendance: 8,000
Referee: Maurice Wetherill

New Zealand	Position	Australia
Bert Cooke (c)	FB	Laurie Ward
Lou Brown	WG	Ray Hines
Cliff Hunt	CE	Dave Brown (c)
Ted Mincham	CE	Ross McKinnon
Herb Lilburne	WG	Sid Goodwin
Arthur Kay	FE	Ernie Norman
Roy Powell	HB	Viv Thicknesse
Lou Hutt	PR	Frank Curran
Cliff Satherley	HK	Percy Fairall
Bill Glynn	PR	Ray Stehr
Jim Laird	SR	Eric Lewis
Reg Ward	SR	Joe Pearce
Jim Calder	LF	Wally Prigg
	Int.
	Coach

=== Third test ===
5 October 1935

New Zealand	8 – 31	Australia
Tries: Brian Riley (2); Goals: Cliff Satherley (1)		Tries: Ross McKinnon (2); Dave Brown; Frank Curran; Sid Goodwin; Ray Hines; Ernie Norman; Goals: Dave Brown (5)

Carlaw Park, Auckland
Attendance: 20,000
Referee: P. Rogers

New Zealand	Position	Australia
Cliff Hunt	FB	Laurie Ward
Lou Brown	WG	Ray Hines
Arthur Kay	CE	Ross McKinnon
Brian Riley	CE	Dave Brown (c)
Alfred Mitchell	WG	Sid Goodwin
Stan Prentice	FE	Ernie Norman
Eric Fletcher	HB	Viv Thicknesse
Harold Tetley	PR	Frank Curran
Cliff Satherley	HK	Percy Fairall
Ray Lawless	PR	Ray Stehr
Jim Laird	SR	Eric Lewis
Lou Hutt	SR	Joe Pearce
Jim Calder	LF	Wally Prigg
	Int.
	Coach

9 October 1935

Auckland	18 – 36	Australia
Tries: Ted Mincham, Bill Telford; Goals: Ted Mincham (1)	Report	Tries: Dave Brown (2), Frank Curran, Jim Gibbs; Goals: Dave Brown (2)

Carlaw Park, Auckland
Attendance: N/A
Referee: V. Simpson

Auckland: Claude Dempsey, George Tittleton, Wally Tittleton, Arthur Kay, Alfred Mitchell, Brian Riley, Eric Fletcher, Lou Hutt (c), J. Flanagan, Des Herring, Ray Lawless, Cliff Satherley, Harold Tetley. Reserves – . Coach –

Australia: Laurie Ward, Ray Hines, Dave Brown (c), Ross McKinnon, Bill Mahon, Ernie Norman, Viv Thicknesse, Frank Curran, Percy Fairall, Ray Stehr, Jim Gibbs, Joe Pearce, Wally Prigg. Reserves –

== Statistics ==
Leading Try Scorer

- 12 by Dave Brown

Leading Point Scorer

- 84 by Dave Brown (12 tries, 24 goals)

Largest Attendance

- 20,000 - First and Third tests vs New Zealand at Carlaw Park, Auckland

Largest non-test Attendance

- 15,000 - Auckland vs Australia at Carlaw Park, Auckland
