= Jack Brodrick =

New Zealand international rugby league player

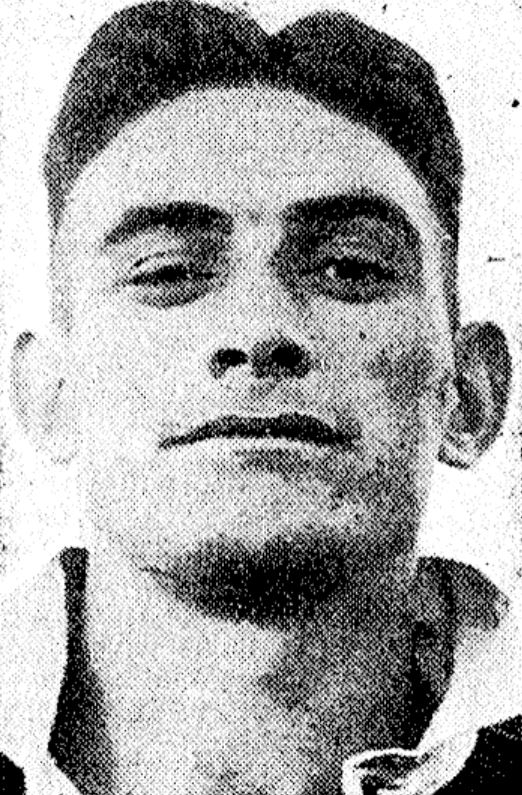

Personal information
- Full name: John Purewa Brodrick
- Born: July 1913 Ruatoki North, Bay of Plenty, New Zealand
- Died: 11 March 1965 (aged 51) Otahuhu, Auckland, New Zealand

Playing information
- Height: 6 ft 1 in (1.85 m)
- Weight: 14 st 7 lb (92 kg)

Rugby union
- Position: Second Row
Club
Years	Team	Pld	T	G	FG	P
1933	Mataatua	1	0	0	0	0
1932–36	Ruatoki	17	4	0	0	12
1935	Combined Team	1	0	0	0	0
	Total	19	4	0	0	12
Representative
Years	Team	Pld	T	G	FG	P
1933	Rangitaiki (sub-union)	3
1933–36	Whakatane (sub-union)	10	1	0	0	3
1934–35	Bay of Plenty	3	3	0	0	9
1935	New Zealand Trial	1	0	0	0	0
1935	Māori All Blacks	9	2	0	0	6
1935–36	Whakatane Māori	2	1	0	0	3

Rugby league
- Position: Second-row, Wing, Centre
Club
Years	Team	Pld	T	G	FG	P
1936–44	Manukau	79	35	0	0	105
Representative
Years	Team	Pld	T	G	FG	P
1937–40	Auckland Māori	7	2	0	0	6
1937–38	Auckland	3	4	0	0	12
1937	New Zealand Trial	1	0	0	0	0
1937–38	New Zealand	7	0	0	0	0
1937	New Zealand Māori	1	0	0	0	0
1938	North Island	1	1	0	0	3

John Purewa Brodrick (Jack) (1913 – 11 March 1965) was a rugby league player. He represented the New Zealand rugby league team in 7 matches in 1937 and 1938. In the process he became the 252nd player to represent New Zealand. He played rugby union in the Bay of Plenty area predominantly for Ruatoki, and represented Bay of Plenty in the mid-1930s, and New Zealand Māori in 1935. He then moved to Auckland and played rugby league for the Manukau club. He represented Auckland, Auckland Māori, the North Island, and New Zealand.

== Early life ==
John (Jack) Brodrick was born in Ruatoki North in the Bay of Plenty in 1913 to Ernest Brodrick (1858–?), and Te Pari Tiakiwai (?-1940) when Ernest was aged 56. Ernest had been born in Baydon, Wiltshire, England in 1858. The original spelling of Brodrick was ‘Broderick’ but the ‘e’ dropped out of the spelling at some point. Jack had another sibling through Ernest and Te Pari's marriage named Mary Brodrick (1916–1984). Ernest had been married previously to Hinemoa Brodrick Tepo (1880–?) and they had a daughter, Emily Margaret Ihaia Brodrick (1902–1987) who was Jack Brodrick's half-sister. The family lived in the Bay of Plenty, in Ruatoki North, while in 1935 the General Roll showed that Ernest was living on Merritt Street in Whakatāne, while working as an agent.

== Playing career ==
=== Rugby Union ===
==== Whakatane HS and Rangitaiki (1931) ====
Jack Brodrick grew up in the Ruatoki area and attended Whakatane High School where he played in the 1st XV rugby union team. After leaving school he spent time in the Rangitaiki District (between Whakatāne and Te Puke) before returning to the Bay of Plenty. The first mention of his involvement in rugby post high school was in 1931 for the Rangitaiki sub union team against Ōpōtiki. He was named in the reserves for the 27 June match when he would have been aged about 18. He was named in their reserves once again on 12 July for a match with Te Puke at Matatā but he in fact played in the game. The Bay of Plenty Times said that Brodrick played a “solid game” in the second row of the forwards. Brodrick's Rangitaiki side lost 10–12 to a last minute penalty to claim the Apanui Shield. Brodrick then played in a match against Whakatane on 1 August which they won 5–3. Rangitaiki played again 2 weeks later on 15 August with Brodrick playing well in the second row in a 15–8 loss. The Bay of Plenty Times said “Broderick secured and made a great run, being pushed out near the line”, then towards the end of the game he secured the ball from a high attacking kick and passed “to Anderson, who pushed his way over the line” to score.

In 1932 Brodrick did not play any rugby. He was charged with stealing a case of beer from Matata Station on 26 December 1931, and plead guilty along with the other 5 men involved. Brodrick was fined £5 and ordered to make restitution of £1 2/6 in order to avoid one months imprisonment along with two of the other men. The other three were given prison sentences due to prior offending. He did not participate in any rugby matches that season.

==== Rugby for Ruatoki and Whakatane (1933) ====
At the start of 1933 Brodrick joined the Ruatoki team where he had grown up. He played in their first match on 6 May against Paroa. He then played in matches against City on 20 May, Whakatane on 27 May, Poroporo on 10 June, and City again on 24 June.

Then in July, Brodrick was selected for the Whakatane (sub-union) representative team to play Tauranga on the 29th. Tauranga won by 16 points to 11 at the Tauranga Domain with Brodrick on the back of the scrum. He played for the same Whakatane side on 5 August against Te Puke at Te Puke's ground. A weakened Whakatane side lost a close game 17–15 with Brodrick playing in the second row. He scored his first try for Whakatane on 26 August in a 16–5 win over Galatea at Matata. His try came early in the match with Whakatane clearing out to a 16–0 lead. The following month Brodrick turned out for Mātaatua in a match with Arawa. They were tribal teams representing Māori with the Mātaatua name deriving from one of the first great voyaging canoes which arrived in the Whakatane area approximately 700 years ago. The game was played at Arawa Park in Rotorua on 30 September with the local side winning 12–3. Brodrick's final game of the season was for Whakatane against Ōpōtiki on 9 September for the Parata Cup. Ōpōtiki had an “easy” 23–5 win.

==== Bay of Plenty debut (1934) ====
The 1934 season saw Brodrick make his full representative debut when he played for the Bay of Plenty side towards the end of the rugby year. His first match of the season was for Ruatoki against the Whakātane club side on 5 May. On 26 May he played for Ruatoki against Waimana in a 12–12 draw. Ruatoki then lost to Paroa 9–6 on 2 June. Brodrick was then chosen in the Whakātane union side to play Rangitaiki at the Whakātane Domain on 19 May. Whakātane lost 12 points to 8. His next game was again for Whakātane against Ōpōtiki on 14 June and then he played again for them on Te Puke on 16 June. Whakatāne won the later match 23 to 3. A month later he was chosen once more in the Whakatane side to play against Rangitaiki for the Te Hurinui Apanui Shield. The match was played at Te Teko on 21 July.

Then in mid September Brodrick was chosen for the Bay of Plenty side to play against the nearby Thames Valley union. Brodrick was chosen in the second row. The match was played at Waihi with Bay of Plenty winning 11 to 9. Brodrick scored a try when Thames Valley led 6–0 to narrow the score. His try came after he picked up the ball from a forward attack and “dashed over to score a good try”. He was chosen as an emergency reserve for Bay of Plenty's match the following Saturday against Waikato at Te Puke but was not required and his season ended.

==== New Zealand Māori (1935) ====
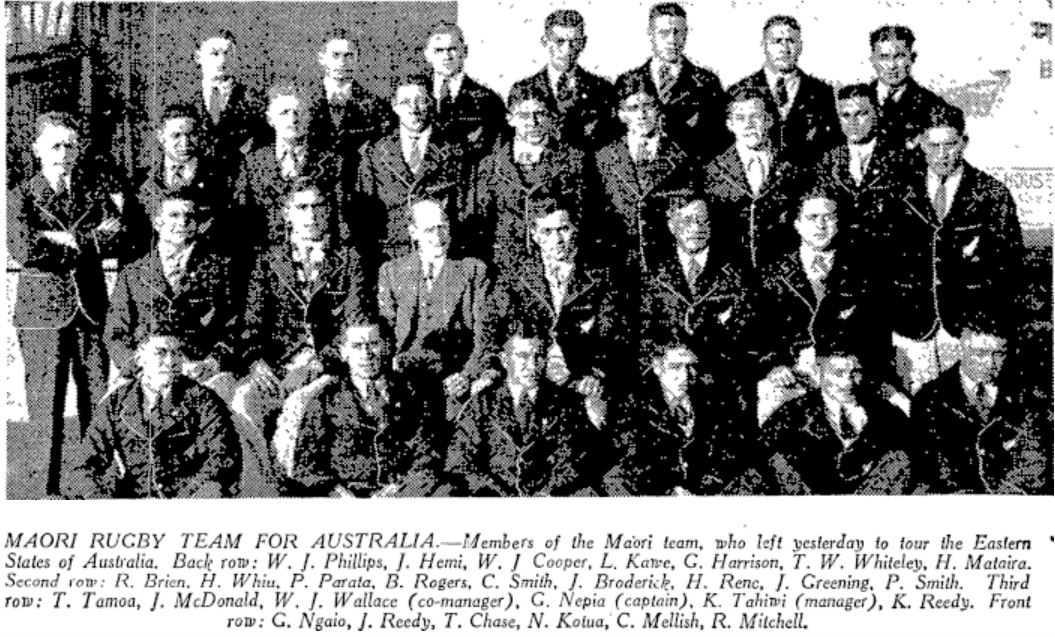

The 1935 season saw Brodrick selected for an All Black trial game, and then later in the season for the New Zealand Māori tour of Australia. Brodrick began the season once more playing for Ruatoki in the Whakātane area competition with games on 4 and 11 May. And then again against Tāneatua on 18 May where they won 20 to 8. On 1 June Brodrick played for Whakātane Māori against Whakātane Pākehā with the Pākehā side winning 11 to 5.

Brodrick was then selected as one of twelve Bay of Plenty players to play in a New Zealand trial match at the Oval in Gisborne. The other eighteen players chosen to make up the two sides were from the Gisborne-Poverty Bay area. From this trial it was intended to choose a team to play a Hawkes Bay-Bush side which would assist the New Zealand selectors in choosing the touring side to tour England. The Possibles whom Brodrick was playing for won the match 19 to 9. The Gisborne Times said that Brodrick was one of the best of the forwards in the match though all played well. Brodrick however missed out on selection for the following match. George Nēpia played in the match and it was reported afterwards that he had received an offer to switch to the rugby league code. He would stay with rugby union at the time but later did make the switch and played with Brodrick at Manukau as well as with New Zealand Māori and New Zealand.

Brodrick then played in 2 more games for Ruatoki against City on 8 June and Waimana on 22 June before he was selected in the Bay of Plenty side to tour the East Coast, Poverty Bay, and Wairoa District.

Brodrick did not however go on the tour with the Bay of Plenty side as he was selected in the Māori All Blacks team to tour Australia from 2 July to mid August. The Gisborne Times reported that the average age of the team was 24 and that Brodrick's height was 6 foot 1, and weight 14 stone. Also in the side was 30 year old George Nēpia, Jack Hemi, Tommy Chase, Hawea Mataira, and Len Kawe. All of whom would convert to rugby league relatively soon after the tour, with Nēpia, Chase, and Kawe all playing with Brodrick at Manukau, while Mataira joined the City Rovers club also in Auckland.

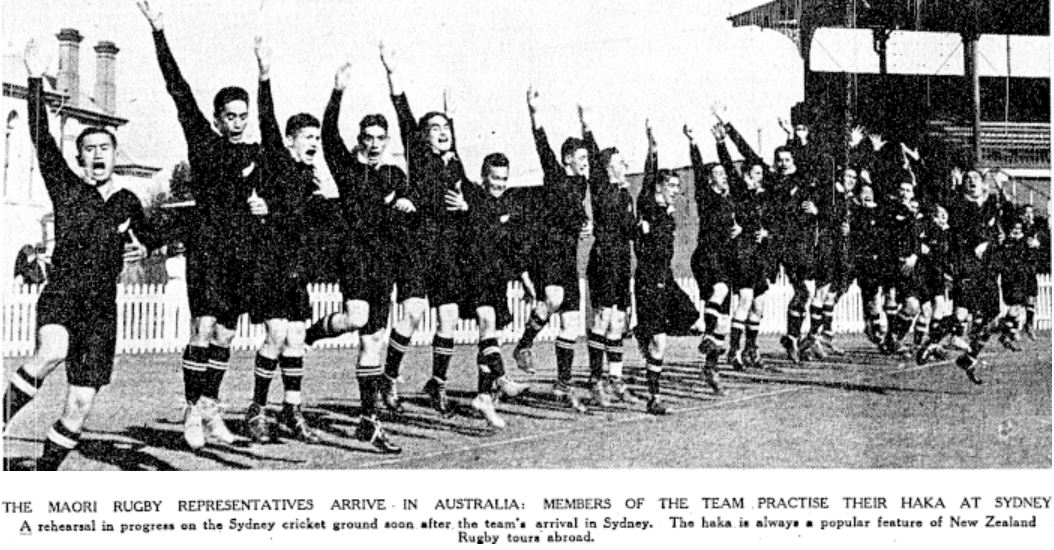
The Māori All Blacks practising the haka at the Sydney Cricket Ground. Brodrick is 4th from the left.

Brodrick played in 7 of the 9 matches on tour. He missed the first match of the tour which was a 39–22 loss to Queensland at the Exhibition Oval in Brisbane on 14 July. Eight of the Māori side were in hospital suffering from influenza, while Brodrick was taken to a dentist on the evening of the game to have an abscessed tooth extracted. Even the manager of the side, Mr. W.J. Wallace was struck down with influenza.

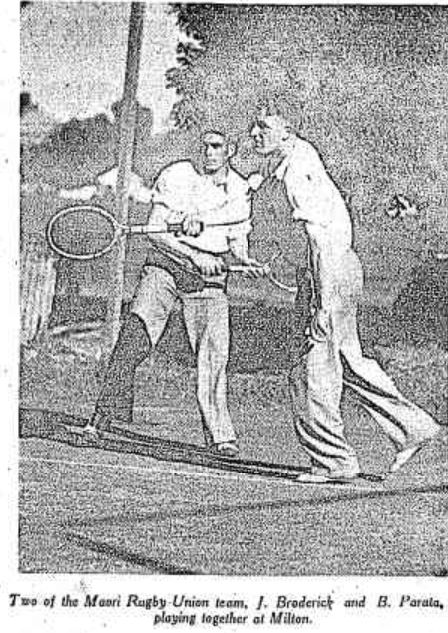
Brodrick and B. Parata playing tennis in Brisbane in mid July.

A photograph of him playing tennis at Milton with teammates appeared in The Telegraph (Brisbane) days later on 16 July.

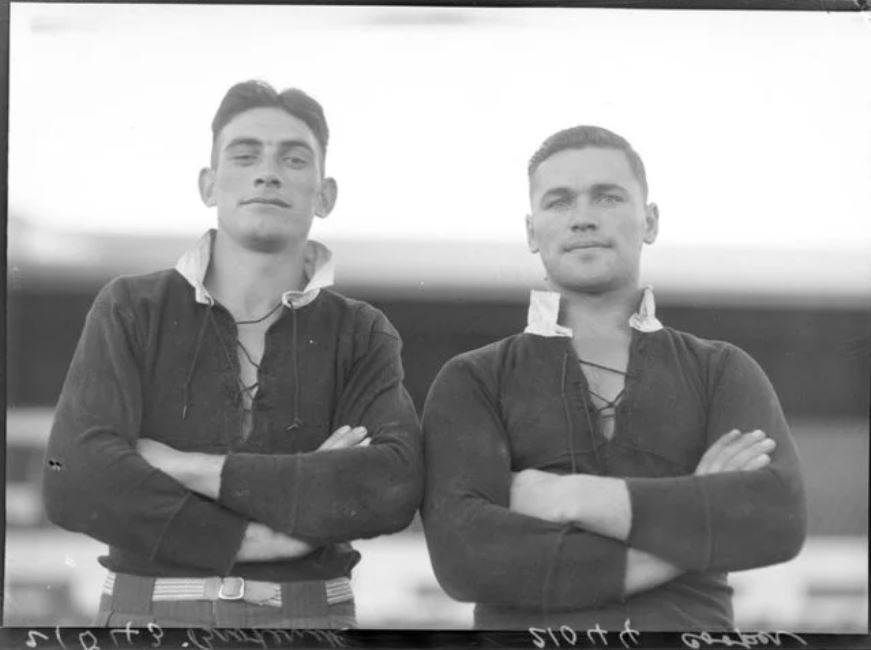
Brodrick and Cooper photo taken by Crown Studios in Wellington following their tour of Australia.

It was reported after the tour that Brodrick and George Harrison were the two fastest players in the team and "with their brilliant speed, were always the worry of the opposition. Brodrick found his place as a permanent loose forward following a race over 60 yards in which he and Harrison beat the remaining members of the touring party". Brodrick's first match was against Toowoomba on 17 July in front of 3,000 spectators. They won 35 to 13 with it reported in the Te Puke Times that along with the Māori side playing spectacularly “another Maori find was Brodrick, who is sure to be picked to play against Queensland on Saturday”. The Courier Mail said afterwards, looking at the team named to play Queensland that “another important pack change will be the inclusion of Broderick, who surprised the managers with his sterling performance at Toowoomba”. And that the team had all recovered from influenza and would be at full strength for the second match against Queensland. The strengthened Māori side won 15 to 13 on 20 July before 10,000 in Brisbane, with Brodrick scoring a try which clinched the match. It was said that “Harrison and Cooper were in particularly good form with Broderick and Mataira next”. Brodrick's try with Hemi's conversion made the score 15–10 in their favour before a Queensland penalty narrowed the margin to the final score. His try came after a movement started by Harrison with Brodrick, Whiteley and Mataira also involved at the head of the raid. At the end of it Brodrick got a “favourable bounce” to collect and go over. Early in the match Brodrick, playing in the loose forwards, had been involved in a movement with Mataira and Whiu which carried the play well into Queensland territory.

Brodrick played in their next match against New South Wales on 27 July before an enormous crowd of 25,000. Brodrick was said to have been “the best of the forwards” along with Rogers. They beat Western Districts in Bathurst by 42 points to 8 with Brodrick not playing. He was however named in their side to play Victoria at the Carlton ground on 3 August.

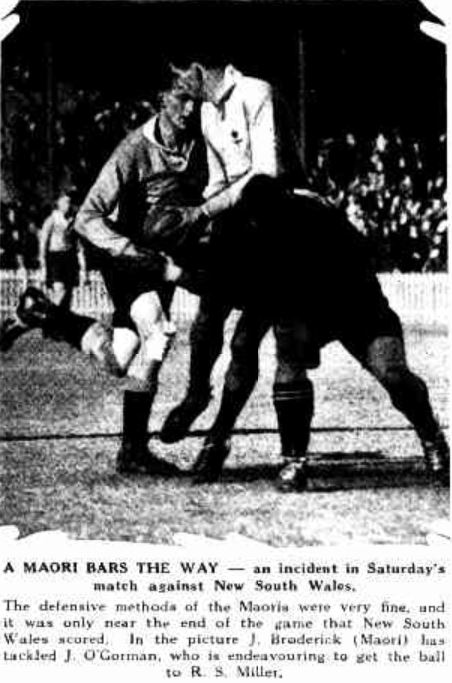

He played again in their second match against New South Wales on 10 August in Sydney. Before 20,000 spectators at the Sydney Cricket Ground the Māori side won 14–5 to win their series against NSW with the Prime Minister of New Zealand, George Forbes in attendance. Early in the second half with the score 3–0 to NZ Māori Brodrick was involved in a dangerous burst with Jack Hemi and C. Smith all handling and NSW was said to be “lucky” to avoid conceding a try. The Sydney Mail published a photograph of Brodrick tackling J. O’Gormon. The Referee publication in Sydney reported that “Brodrick and Rodgers also played havoc among our inside men who were standing too far up on the opposition when New South Wales won the ball. These two men have yeoman service, and were instrumental in stopping our backs from getting going”. He also gave Gibbons, the halfback a “torrid time” along with Harrison.

The team then traveled north to play in Newcastle and their selectors, Billy Wallace, and Kingi Tahiwi chose Brodrick on the back of the scrum once more. New Zealand Māori won the game by 11 points to 0.

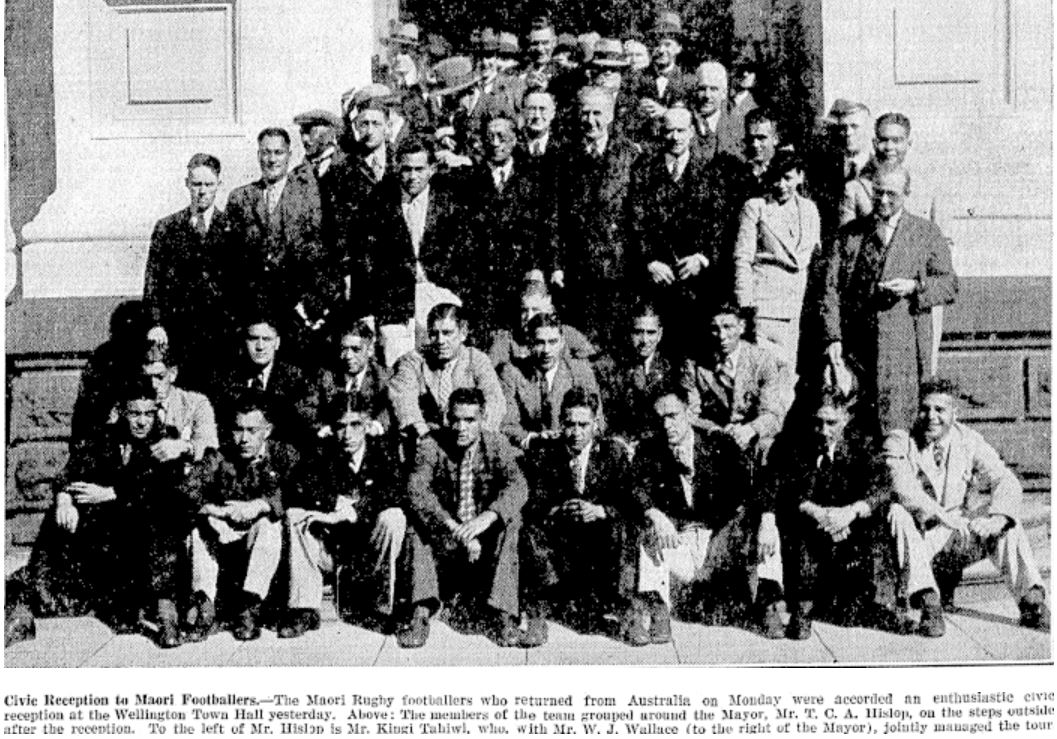
Brodrick seated in the front row, 3rd from left at a civic reception outside the Wellington Town Hall before their game against Wellington on 21 August.

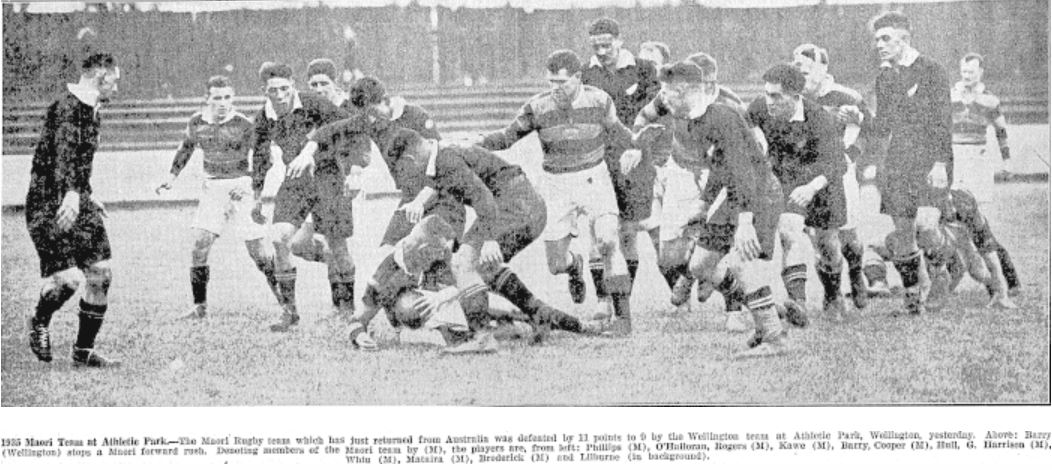
Brodrick observing play from the right in the Māori All Blacks uniform of a black jersey with the silver fern.

After returning from the tour the NZ Māori side travelled to Wellington to play against Wellington at Athletic Park on 21 August. Wellington won 11 to 9 with Brodrick playing, with a photograph showing him standing behind a ruck. They then traveled north to Auckland to play Auckland at Eden Park. Brodrick was named in an extended forward pack with one to be omitted. The match was played on 24 August and Brodrick was named to play on the back of the scrum once again when the final team was named. NZ Māori won 14 points to 10 before a crowd of 12,000. Brodrick was involved in a try when he shot out of a loose scramble with the ball and sent C. Smith away before P. Rogers eventually crossed to make the score 6–0.

The team then disbanded with Brodrick heading back to the Bay of Plenty. There he was named in their representative side to play King Country on 28 August. King Country won narrowly in the match, played in Tauranga 22 to 17 in a “spectacular match”. Brodrick scored two of the Bay of Plenty's tries. The first came after a run from E. Howell and then “Brodrick pushed over and scored in the north eastern corner”. Then immediately after the start of the second half he “secured from the ruck and raced through. Durbridge ran after him and tackled his big opponent right on the line, but Brodrick dropped over and scored between the posts” with the kick putting the home side up 17–11 before King Country's late rally. Brodrick nearly scored again later in the match after he broke clear and took play to halfway, and “a minute later he broke clear and beat all the opposing backs except Howie, who stopped him and sent the ball to touch”. On the King Country team was Frank Pickrang who would also convert to rugby league in 1936, with Brodrick joining him in the Manukau side. Both were said to be among the best forwards in the match. Pita Ririnui was in Brodrick's side and was another player who switched to league and joined Manukau. The King Country Chronicle described Brodrick's second try as “the finest solo run of the match” and that he was “the best forward on the ground”.

Brodrick was named to play in Bay of Plenty's match with Thames Valley on 14 September at Arawa Park in Rotorua. He was selected in the rover position on the back of the scrum. Bay of Plenty won 20 points to 6. Then 2 weeks later he played for a combined side against Rangitaiki who were the holders of the Te Hurinui-Apanui Shield and champion team of Bay of Plenty. The combined team was made up of all the other unions in the province. The match was played at Matata with the Rangitaiki wide winning easily 34 to 3.

==== Ruatoki, Whakatane, before switching to rugby league (1936) ====
Brodrick began the season once more as a member of the Ruatoki club. On 13 June he scored “a clever try” for them in a 14–10 win over Waimana at the Whakatane Domain. A week later on 20 June he played in the annual match between Māori and Pākehā for the Jackson Shield. The Maori team won easily 25 to 6 with Brodrick scoring their first try. He scored again on 27 June, this time for Whakatane against Opotiki at the Whakatane Domain. Whakatane won 13 to 5 with Brodrick “the pick of the forwards” along with J. Brown, J. Scott, M. Cummings, and B. Mate. Brodrick was then chosen in the Whakatane side to play a week later on 4 July against Rangitaiki for the Te Hurinui Apanui Shield at Matata. Rangitaiki won the match to retain the shield by 13 points to 9 in a closely fought contest. The Te Puke Times wrote that Brodrick “caught the eye in the Whakatane forwards”.

=== Rugby league ===
==== Rugby League switch, Manukau ====
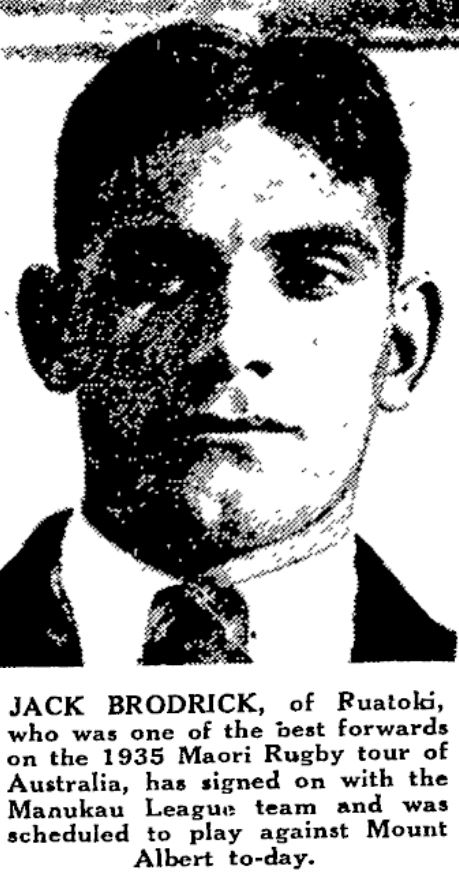

Just weeks later, on 31 July it was reported in the Auckland Star that Brodrick was switching to the rugby league code and joining the Manukau club in the Auckland Rugby League competition. He was named in their side to play Mount Albert United on 1 August at Carlaw Park. The Poverty Bay Herald wrote a piece on Brodrick on 3 August. It said “an outstanding forward of the Maori All Blacks who toured in Australia last year, [he] arrived in Auckland last week to play for the Manukau Rugby League Club. Just turned 23 years of age and weighing 14st., this 6ft. player won a reputation across the Tasman as a determined and fast type of forward. In seven of the nine matches on the tour he scored, and in one match he got two tries. He was a back row scrummer. Brodrick was born at Ruatoki North in the Bay of Plenty, and played in the Whakatane High School first fifteen. For a time he was in the Rangitaiki district between Whakātane and Te Puke, but returned to the Bay of Plenty, which district he represented in 1933-34-35 before being selected to join the team led by George Nēpia in Australia. Being speedy and a good handler he may be tried out as a three-quarter by the Manukau club”.

Brodrick did indeed debut for Manukau on 1 August in their 11–6 win over the competition leaders. The Auckland Star wrote that “to play for Manukau now appears to be a Maori ambition, and out of a number of new applications for a place in the team the club decided on Saturday to give a trial to Broderick, the 14-stone Bay of Plenty forward, with a try-out at wing three quarter, mostly with the idea that it was the best berth to put him in while he picked up some of the essentials of a game that was strange to him”. They went on to add that “Broderick could not be judged as a three-quarter, but he did some hard, straight running on the wing, passed unselfishly, and appeared to have more than an elementary knowledge of the tricky play-the-ball rule, which is the bug bear of the average League recruit”. The New Zealand Herald said he “played well on the wing, his strong running being a feature”. Brodrick was officially registered with Manukau during the following week, as was Angus Gault who had joined the side from the King Country.

He played again against Marist Old Boys the following weekend on 22 August in a 24–7 win, and then a week a later in their 26–6 win over Newton Rangers. That win sealed the championship for Manukau, as it was the first in their history, and a notable effort for a club which was back in the first grade for the first time, in over a decade. The Herald wrote that “a few weeks ago there were ten offers from new players to turn out for them. And out of the ten only one was considered. That was Broderick, who was one of the outstanding forwards in the last Maori team that went to Australia”.

He was part of a “great quartet” in the forwards which included Frank Pickrang, Len Kawe, and Steve Watene, with “Brodrick and Watene conspicuous for good football”. On 5 September, he “caught the eye” in a 10–8 win over Ponsonby United in the first round of Roope Rooster knockout competition. The New Zealand Herald wrote afterwards that he was “splendid” along with Pickrang. He is one of the fastest forwards in the game. He played again in an 18–8 win over Papakura on 19 September at Prince Edward Park in Papakura. Two weeks later in the final he scored his first try in a Manukau jersey when they beat City Rovers 23–10. He “made a fine run before being tackled”, and “was perhaps the best forward. Many times his speed and splendid handling paved the way for tries”. The Auckland Star saying he and Angus Gault were “two fine forwards” for Manukau. In his final match of the season he played in the Stormont Shield (champion of champions) match against Richmond Rovers on 3 October at Carlaw Park. Richmond contained several New Zealand internationals in their thirteen. Manukau were beaten by 30 points to 9. Brodrick was one the forwards who never slackened their effort along with Angus Gault, John Rutherford and Frank Pickrang. He was involved in their only try to Walter Brimble after Brodrick made a great dash for 60 yards, and tackled Tetley near Richmond’s goal. Gault snapped up the ball and Brimble was over in a flash.

==== Manukau, Auckland Māori, Auckland, and New Zealand (1937) ====
It was reported in the Herald on 16 April that Manukau would field practically the same team in 1937, including Brodrick once more. He played in their opening game the following day, a pre-season match with Richmond which they lost 15–11. In their second pre-season match against Newton a week later he scored 3 tries in a 37–19 win. The Star wrote “”Broderick, who so greatly impressed the Australian critics a few seasons back, was Manukau’s outstanding player”. In their opening championship match of the season against North Shore Albions Brodrick played on the wing, and scored one of their three tries in a 19–12 win at Carlaw Park. It came after “a clever blindside move engineered by Peter Mahima”. A week later on 8 May, in a 17–10 win over Marist the Star said that “dashing runs by the husky Maori, Brodrick, who on one occasion perfectly hurdled an opponent,…”.

Following the game Brodrick was selected by Ernie Asher in the Auckland Māori squad to play "Auckland", though in future these matches would be billed as Auckland Māori v Auckland Pākehā. Later in the week he was chosen in the starting thirteen on the wing with Jack Hemi at centre. The Pākehā side won the match, played at Carlaw Park on 12 May by 24 points to 12. Brodrick marked George Tittleton on the opposite wing. It was reported that Brodrick “lacked opportunities, but played a good game”. He scored a try after Joe Broughton “raced down the sideline and Brodrick went over for a spectacular try” which was converted by Steve Watene to give them a 5–0 lead.

He played for Manukau against Ponsonby on 15 May in a 7–3 loss, and then against Mount Albert on 22 May which they also lost 20–4. The Star said he was among their best forwards along with Angus Gault, Phillips, and Len Kawe. Then in a 13–13 draw with City he scored a try while playing at centre and “was prominent with some determined running”. The Herald said he was “outstanding for Manukau, and always dangerous on attack”.

Brodrick was then selected to play in the Auckland side, making his debut. The selector was former international Hec Brisbane. Their opponent was Taranaki with the match to be played on 9 June at Carlaw Park. Although Brodrick had been playing in the backs for Manukau recently, Brisbane selected him in the second row alongside George Mitchell from the Richmond Rovers club. Auckland won comfortably, 27 to 10 with it said that “the Auckland forward play was marked by its evenness, with Broderick, with his bouncing run and ability to juggle the ball, the most colourful of the lot”. The Herald wrote that “both Mitchell and Broderick played splendid football” and stated both “look certain of inclusion in any representative team as second row forwards”. Early in the game “a spectacular hurdle by Broderick placed Auckland in a good position and Gault went over, only to be called back for a forward pass”. Then in the second half he broke away and John Donald scored.

Back playing for Manukau on 12 June he shone for them in the forwards, however they went down 22–18 against Richmond. The side then traveled to Tāneatua to play a Bay of Plenty side on 19 June. In a high scoring game, won by Manukau 51–33, Brodrick scored two tries and “played an exceptionally fine game for the visitors”. Manukau's next game in Auckland was a win (31–11) against North Shore on 3 July, and then another win followed against Marist (20–13) on 10 July. It was said that the Manukau pack worked strenuously throughout, “and men who emerged with honours were Painter, Kawe, Brodrick, and Gault”. He played another “good game” against Newton on 17 July with Manukau winning once more, 22–5, to move into 3rd position on the table after ten rounds of the Fox Memorial championship.

Brodrick was selected in the Auckland Māori side to play Waikato Māori in a midweek clash on 21 July. He was selected in the second row alongside George Mitchell. The match was for the Waitangi Shield with the Waikato side being the current holders. The Auckland Māori side won 28 to 6.

===== New Zealand debut v Australia =====
After a game for Manukau against Ponsonby, won 18–6 Brodrick was selected in the Possibles side to play the Probables, which was a New Zealand trial match on 28 July. Australia was touring New Zealand with the first test on 7 August. He was placed in the second row alongside Frank Pickrang with Steve Watene at lock. The second rowers on the other side were Jack McLeod from Richmond, and C. Berry of Wellington. Brodrick's Possibles side won 25 to 11 at Carlaw Park in heavy conditions. The Herald wrote that “Morgan, Brodrick and Watene… appear certain to secure selection against the Australians”. Brodrick played one more match for Manukau before the New Zealand test side was to be named. It was against Richmond on 31 July with the match drawn 11–11. During the second half “the crowd cheered a fine run by Brodrick and, amidst excitement, Mahima equalised” with a try. And he was “outstanding” according to the Herald though in another of their articles he “hung on too long, and twice in the first half missed scoring opportunities”.

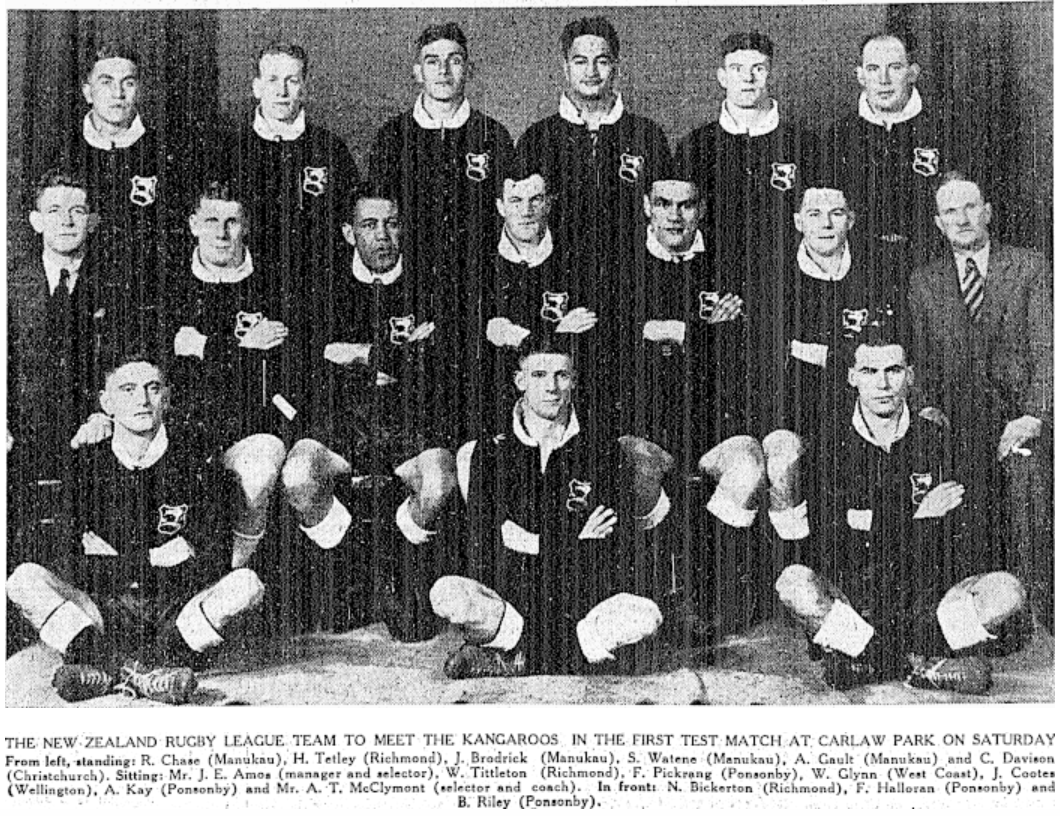

On 4 July the New Zealand side was named with Brodrick chosen. The Herald said “it is expected that Mataira and Brodrick, two ex New Zealand Maori representatives, will comprise the second row. Brodrick will need to improve his style of passing, which is similar to a throw, making the ball difficult to hold”. He had been named in a group of seven forwards with one to be omitted.

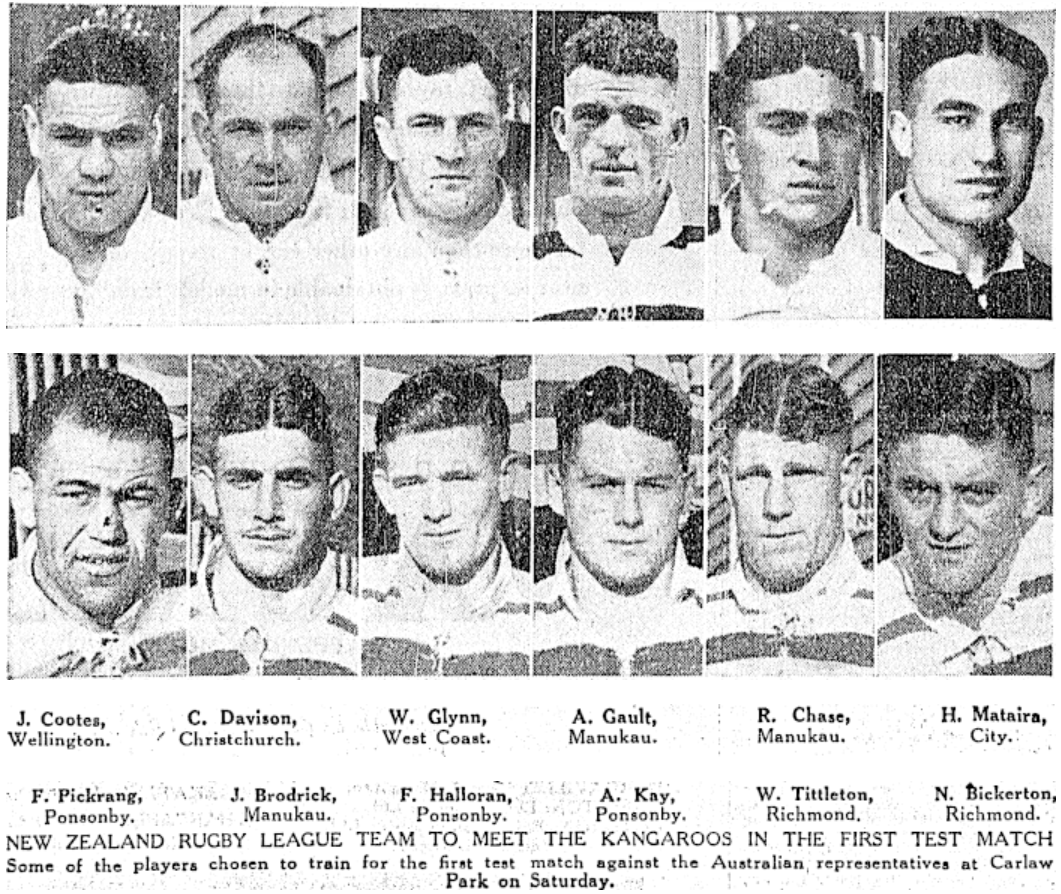
New Zealand profile pictures including Jack Brodrick for the first test v Australia.

Two days later on 6 August Brodrick was indeed named to start in the second row alongside Harold Tetley with Jack McLeod at lock. In the Australian second row was Joe Pearce and Eric Lewis. It was speculated that “Gault and Brodrick should be able to keep their opponents moving throughout”.

The first test was played on 7 August at Carlaw Park with Australia triumphing 12–8 after the scores had been tied at halftime 6–6. The Herald reported that Brodrick “played ably” in the forwards along with Billy Glynn. Though he “hung on a little too long on one occasion, and the home team missed a possible try”.

He was then named in the New Zealand Māori team to play South Auckland (Waikato) the following day at Huntly. However he had a slight injury and was left out of the side. He was named in the New Zealand Māori extended squad to play Australia 3 days later on Wednesday, 11 August.

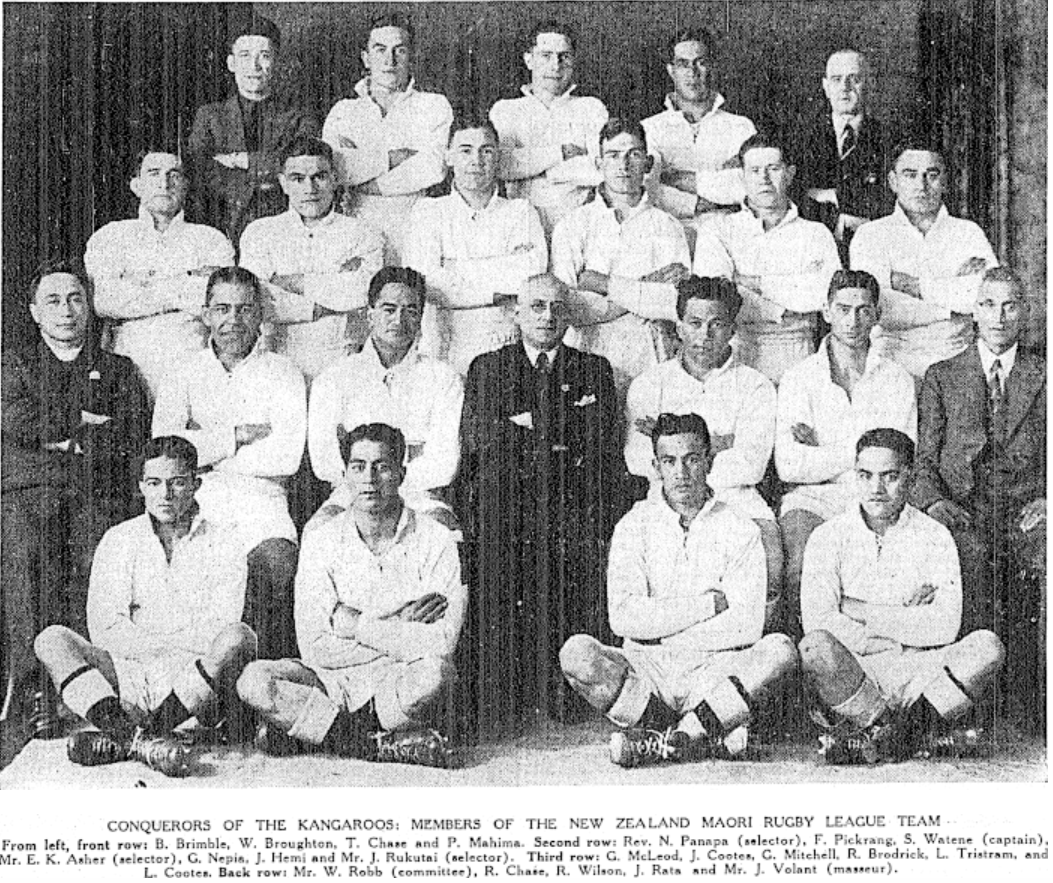

The match was the first ever occasion where a New Zealand Māori rugby league team had played Australia. Brodrick was chosen to start in the second row when the final team was named, once more alongside George Mitchell. In the second row for Australia was Edward Collins and Gordon McLennan. In something of an upset the Māori team won by 16 points to 5 at Carlaw Park before a crowd of 11,000. Brodrick scored one of the NZ Māori sides tries, with Rangi Chase scoring the other. George Nēpia played brilliantly throughout the match despite now being in his early 30s, kicking 4 goals for the home side. Brodrick's try was said to be “the try of the game” and came “as the outcome of a bit of whirlwind play that completely upset Australian plans and calculations. A collective thrust was made at the visitors corner and then the play fanned across the Australian twenty-five. Play was rapidly swinging to the opposite side of the field when Joe Cootes suddenly reversed the scheme of things by throwing the ball far and wide to the left. It fell in space with all the Australian defence out of position. And then Brodrick flashed into the picture in truly opportunist way to go over and score”. The Auckland Star wrote “one could not praise the Maori forwards beyond their deserts. Brodrick gave a magnificent exhibition, form that was in keeping with what he showed in Australia two seasons ago when he was hailed as one of the greatest forwards New Zealand has produced” when on the New Zealand Māori rugby union team which toured there.

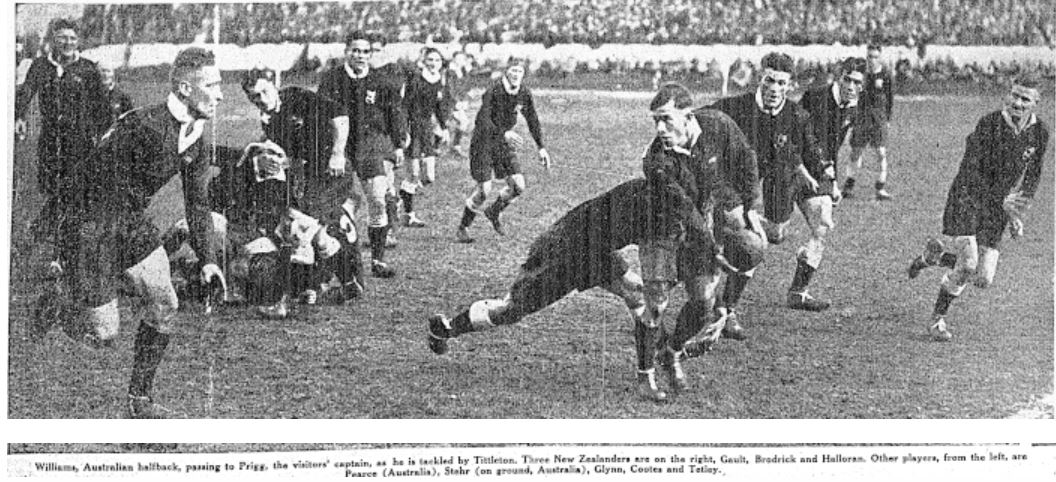

Brodrick was then selected in the New Zealand side to play the Australians in the second and final test at Carlaw Park 3 days later on 14 August. Brodrick was paired with Joe Cootes in the second row with Joe Pearce and Eric Lewis opposite. With a crowd of 25,000 at Carlaw Park present the New Zealand team won by 16 points to 15.

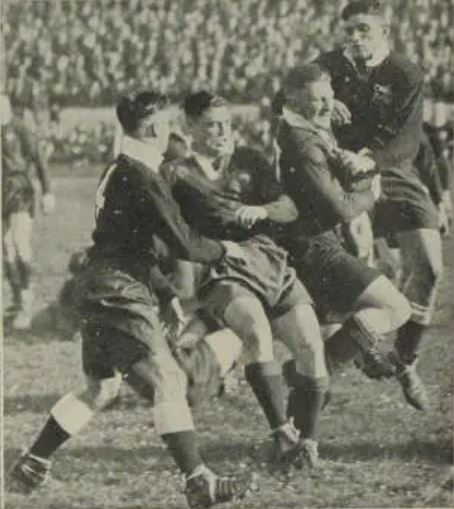
Brodrick leaping into a tackle from the right.

The Australian side was particularly unlucky, suffering several serious injuries and at one point in the second half they only had ten players on the field. The Auckland Star said that “without quite rising to the heights that he did in the Maori match Brodrick was the pick of the New Zealand van”. In the first half “Mclean made a fine dash, until he was caught by Brodrick”, then a while later “Brodrick was again prominent, and getting the ball from [Noel] Bickerton, he raced 40 yards before passing to [Billy] Glynn, [Harold] Tetley, and [Ces] Davison completing the movement for another try at the corner”. With the score 15–11 to Australia and the visiting side depleted, particularly their forward pack which was down to four players, “the home forwards now dominated the game and Brodrick and Cootes broke away. Tetley, however, missed badly and New Zealand lost a try”. Soon after Frank Halloran nearly scored, and then Brodrick came close being pushed into touch. Brodrick was all over the field by this point, and “thrilled the crowd with a great dash. His final pass to Glynn, however, was knocked on”. New Zealand then “attacked vigorously and good work by Cootes and Brodrick improved the position. Halloran cut in nicely and passed to [Wally] Tittleton and [Arthur] Kay, who drew the defence cleverly and sent Bickerton over for the try”. The try put New Zealand ahead 16–15 after Nēpia had earlier kicked a penalty. Brodrick wasn't finished however and towards the end of the game he “went close to scoring, but a scrum was ordered on the visitors’ line”. Following the match the Herald wrote that “Brodrick, Glynn, and Gault were a trio of determined, hard-working forwards, with the first named most prominent. Brodrick made a number of brilliant dashes, but should learn to drop his one handed style of passing and dangerous hurdling tactics”. In another article they singled him out as “the outstanding New Zealand forward” as he “played three sterling games”.

Brodrick then returned to the Manukau side for their round 13 Fox Memorial match with Mount Albert on 21 August. Manukau lost 20–19 with Brodrick playing in the centre position where he “filled the position with credit… he once made a great run by beating several defenders with a deceptive “dummy”. They lost their last game of the championship to City and finished 4th of the 8 teams. They were then eliminated on round 1 of the Roope Rooster knockout competition, going down to Mount Albert 35–18 with Brodrick scoring one of Manukau's 4 tries. They beat Newton in round 1 of the consolation Phelan Shield competition, and then their season was over a week later on 18 September with a 16–10 loss to North Shore with Brodrick once again crossing for a try. The Herald said that “Brodrick was in splendid form and stood out as the best forward on the ground”.

While Brodrick's season was over for Manukau he was selected to play two further representative games. The first was on 14 September where he was selected in the forwards for the Auckland Māori side (also named Tāmaki) to play North Auckland Māori at Carlaw Park. The match was for the Waitangi Shield which the Auckland side held. The Auckland Māori side won easily 37 to 3 to retain the trophy. His final match of the year was for the New Zealand Māori side which played against Auckland on 9 October. The match was played for the Max Jaffe Cup as part of a gala day to raise money for injured players. The Māori side was similar to the one which had defeated Australia months earlier. The New Zealand Māori team won comfortably by 43 points to 21 with Brodrick scoring one of their nine tries. He played in the second row alongside George Mitchell as he had now done several times. The Herald wrote that “a feature of the game was excellent play of the Maori forwards. Brodrick, Mitchell, and Tristram”. They went on to say that he along with those named forwards “played dashing games and were frequently a thorn in the side of the Auckland team”, and that Brodrick in particular “played an outstanding game and is the most improved forward in the code. His speed made great gaps in the defence, and even good tackling failed on occasions to stop his progress”.

=== New Zealand tour of Australia (1938) ===
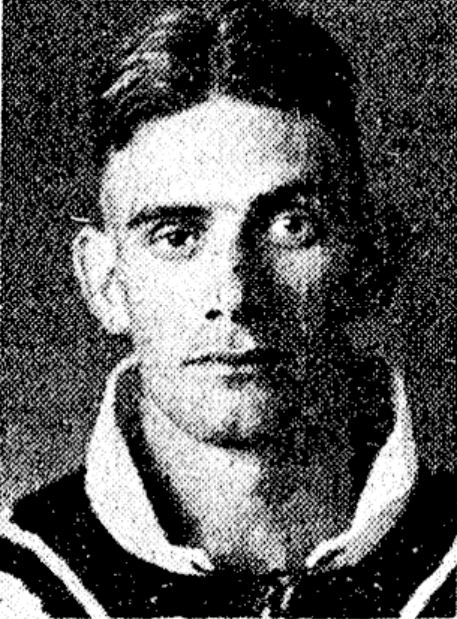
Portrait photo of Brodrick in 1938 in the New Zealand Herald.

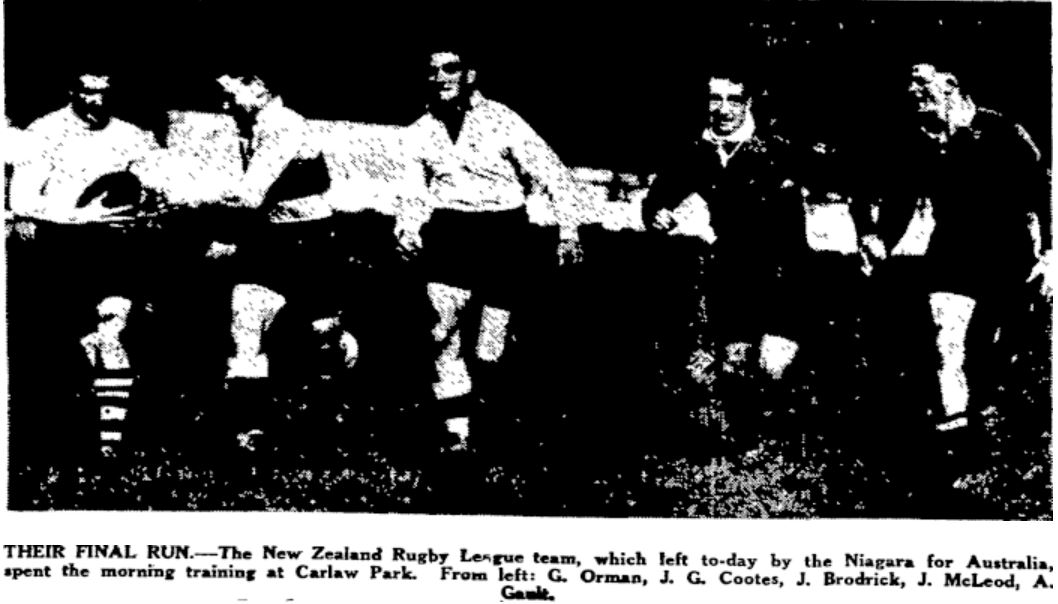
Brodrick (in the centre) training at Carlaw Park before their departure.

The 1938 season was arguably the most significant of Brodrick's career. He played in 15 games for Manukau, scoring a career high 11 tries, and also played twice for Auckland, once for the North Island, and then five times for New Zealand on their tour of Australia. He began the season in a pre-season match for Manukau against a South Auckland XIII at Waikaraka Park in Onehunga where the Manukau side was based. Manukau won 32–6 with Brodrick scoring a try. In comments from the Herald regarding various players and teams prospects they wrote of Brodrick that “this should be a great season for J. Brodrick, whose brilliant form in the Maori match against Australia last year, samps him as the finest forward seen in the code for many years”. He scored again in their final pre-season game in a 19–11 win over Ponsonby United where he played “outstanding”. The Herald said he “stands out as one of the best forwards in the game, and he will supported by Gault, and [Jack] Whye, of last years team”.

Brodrick had been injured in their game with Ponsonby and missed the opening game of the Fox Memorial championship. Manukau lost in an upset to Newton. Brodrick returned the following week in their 26–21 win over North Shore where he scored two tries. He “played a dashing game and proved difficult to stop”, and was “probably the best forward in the game”. His passing with Gault and Pita Ririnui was “a feature of the game”. He played well again the following week in a 18–4 win over Marist and scored another try. Brodrick played well once more in Manukau's 17–9 defeat of Mount Albert on 7 May. And in a continuation of his scoring form he crossed for another try. Against Richmond a week later Brodrick was forced to go off with a dislocated finger to have it put back in. However, when he came back on to the field the referee, former international Maurice Wetherill, said that he had been replaced and could not return.

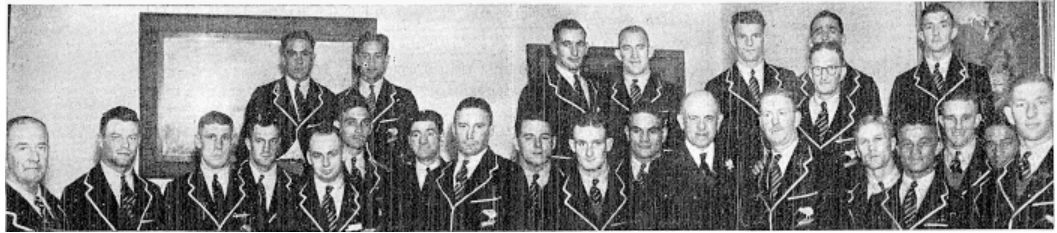
Brodrick 7th from the left, below Jack Hemi

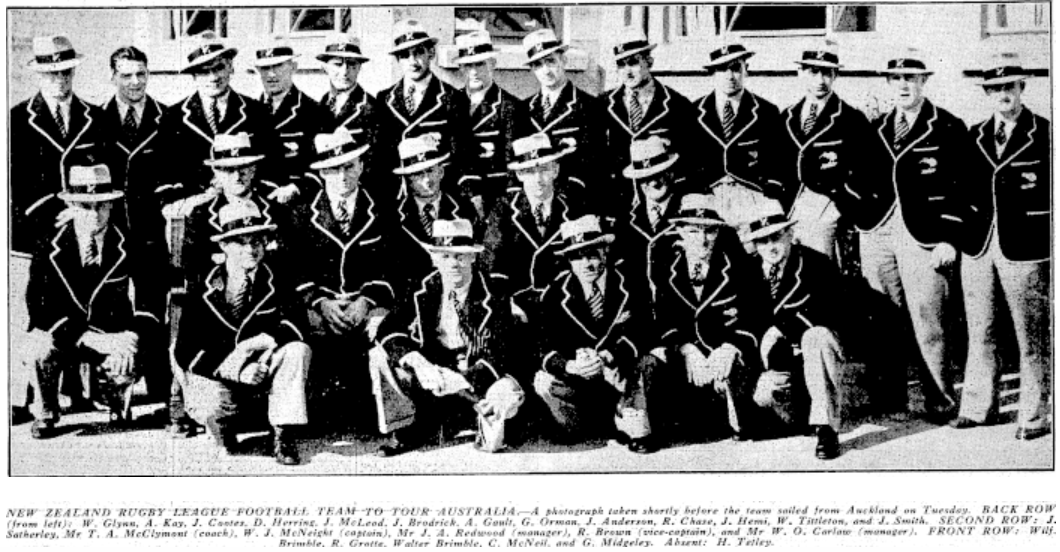
The New Zealand team prior to departure.

He was selected in a midweek trial match to help the selectors choose the New Zealand team to tour Australia. Being named in the Auckland side to play a Rest of North Island side on 18 May at Carlaw Park. The Auckland Star wrote that he and Harold Tetley were “amongst the best loose forwards in the game”. He was partnered with John Anderson in the second row. The Herald said before the match that “no second-row forward has better claims than Brodrick… [and that he] always shows out”. The Auckland team proved far too strong for their opponents, winning 67 to 14 with Brodrick crossing for 3 of their 14 tries. He was reportedly “the best forward on the ground, and perhaps the fastest player”.

After the match the North Island team was selected by Scotty McClymont, Hec Brisbane, and Gordon Hooker. Brodrick was unsurprisingly named in the second row, alongside Manukau teammate Angus Gault, with Harold Tetley at lock. The second row in the South Island was R. Price and N Clarke. The North Island side trounced their South Island opponents by 55 points to 2 with Brodrick scoring a try. He was involved in a passing movement with Wilfred Brimble leading to a try to Jack Satherley in the first half. Following the game the NZ Herald wrote brief profiles of the players and said of Brodrick that he “is 25 years of age and weighs 14st 7lb. He is the fastest forward in the code. he came to Auckland from the Bay of Plenty as a rugby representative, and toured Australia with the New Zealand Maori team in 1935 with Nepia and Hemi. Brodrick is spectacular in his movements and will be a favourite with Sydney crowds”.

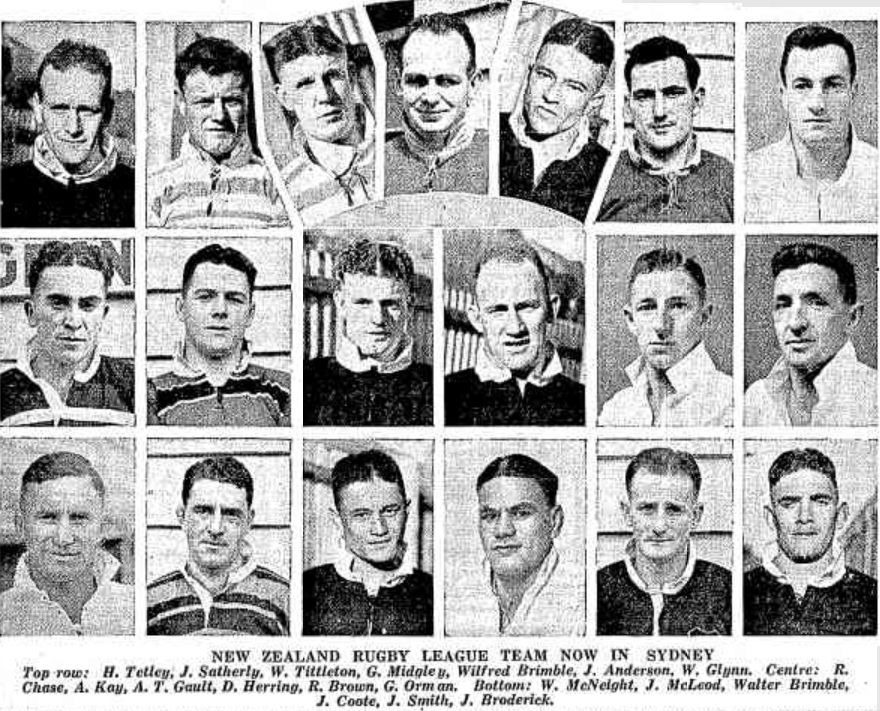

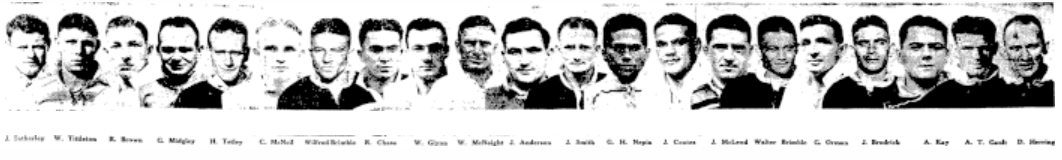
Brodrick 4th from the right

Brodrick was then selected for the New Zealand team for the tour. The Star newspaper wrote that he and Tetley are two “specialists … for off the scrum work”. Twenty Two players were selected for the tour with 18 from Auckland. On 31 May they were entertained at George Court, Limited for morning tea, and then given a civic farewell at the Auckland Town Hall by the Mayor, Sir Ernest Davis. The evening prior they were the guests at a farewell ball “tendered by the Auckland Rugby League Ladies’ Social Committee at the Peter Pan cabaret”. The team departed later on the evening of the 31st.

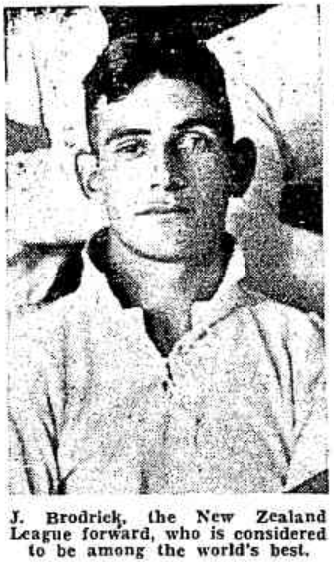
The Courier Mail of Brisbane published this photo of Brodrick on 31 May

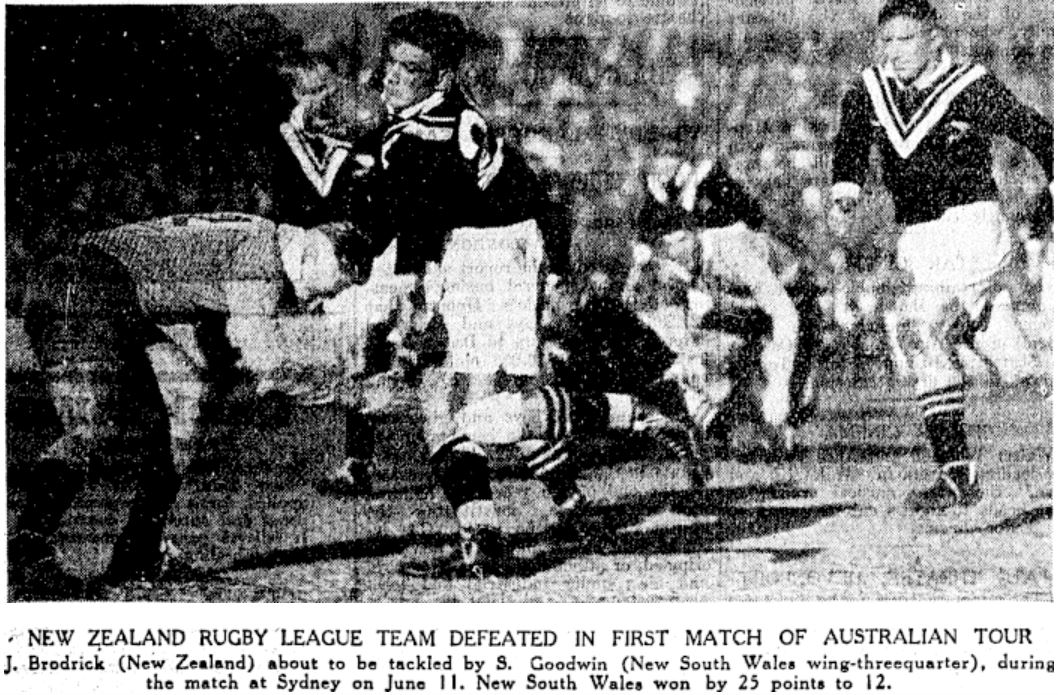

Before the first tour match, The Labor Daily described Brodrick and McNeight as “both well over 14st. in support, and each racehorses in the loose”. Auckland Rugby League secretary Ivan Culpan later provided “thumb nail sketches” of each player for Australian newspapers. In a profile published by The Cairns Post, Brodrick was described as a 25-year-old Manukau forward from the Bay of Plenty who had become popular with New Zealand audiences for his performances in both tight and loose play. The article also noted his height, speed, and athletic style of play, and referred to his performances against the Kangaroos and his reputation as an international-level forward.

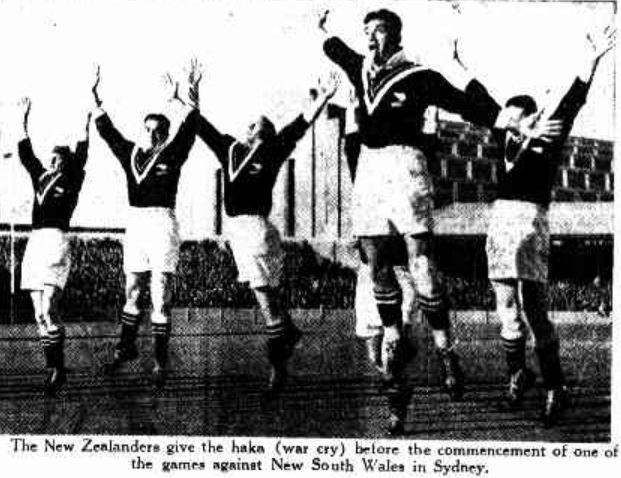
Brodrick leading the haka v New South Wales.

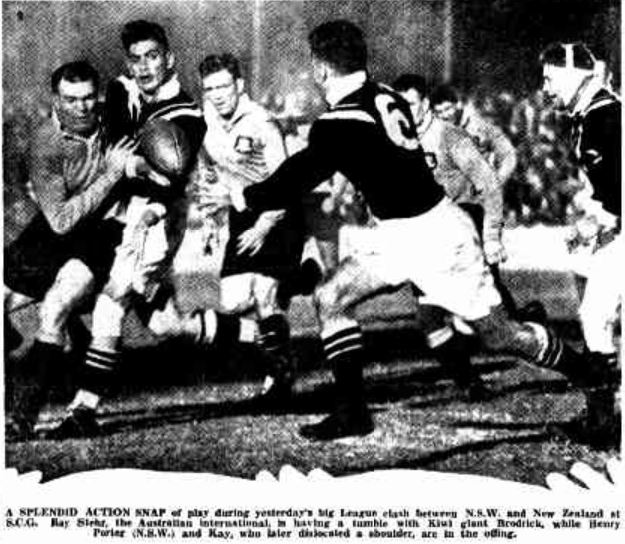
Brodrick off loading to Arthur Kay.

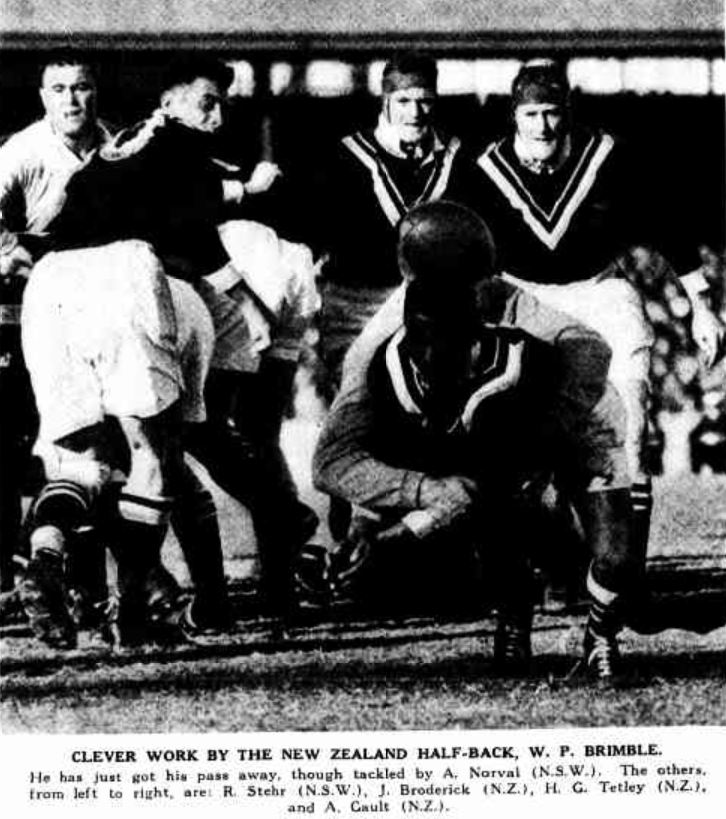
Brodrick with his back to the play

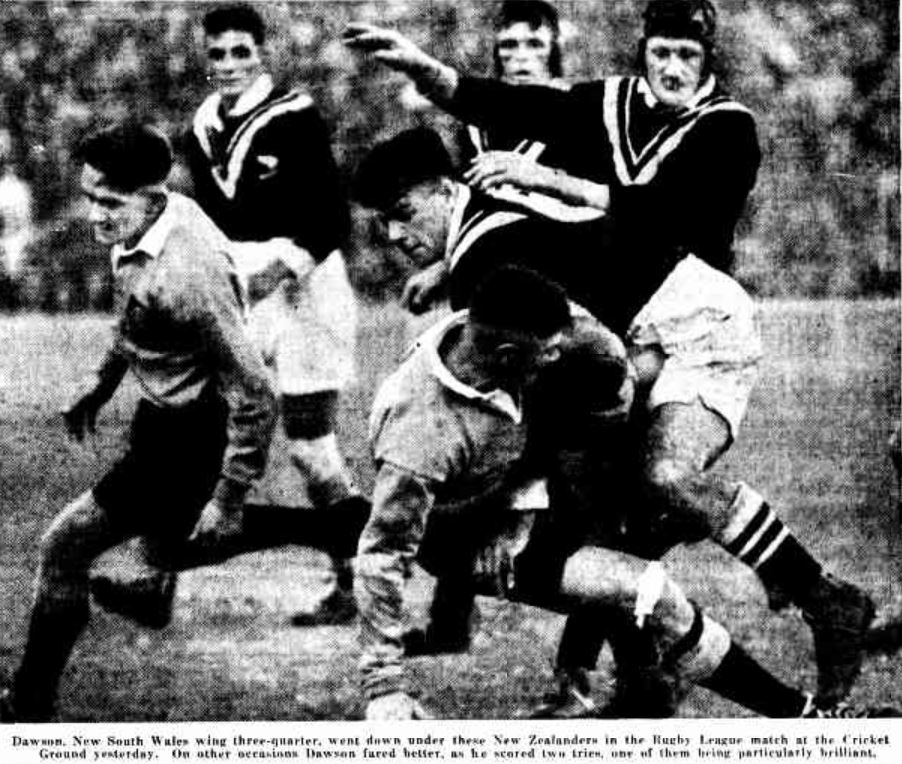
Brodrick in the background to the left in the match against NSW at the SCG.

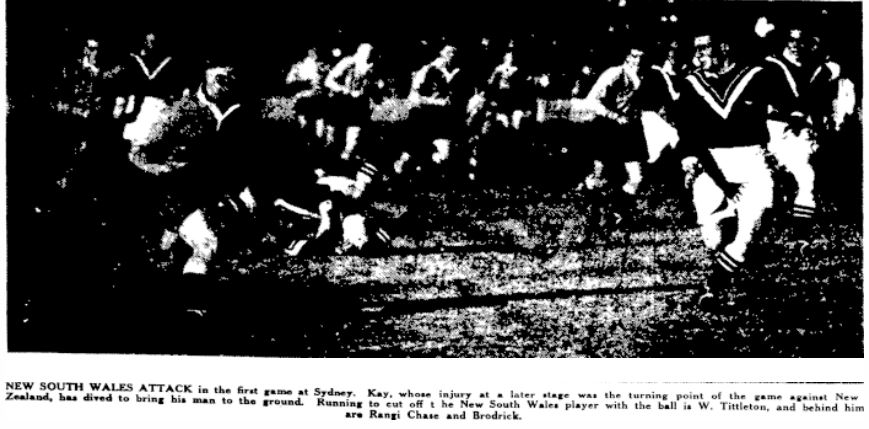

Their first match of the tour was against New South Wales on 11 June. Brodrick played in the second row of a 25–12 loss at the Sydney Cricket Ground before 28,303 spectators. The New Zealand side was a little unlucky with Arthur Kay having to leave the field in the second half with New Zealand leading, leaving them with 12 players for the remainder of the match. The Daily Telegraph said that Brodrick was the “star” of the forwards who played “splendidly”. At one point early in the game Hemi punted high and “Brodrick, coming through speedily, gathered it. He hurled himself at the line, but encountered Felsch, who threw him back infield…”. He was involved in another attacking movement later with Arthur Kay and Jack Hemi. Towards the end of the match “New Zealand made a great effort, Brodrick hurdled over Williams, raced to the full-back, but unfortunately his pass to Hemi was forward when a try seemed imminent”. The Sun newspaper said that “Brodrick’s loping run made him always a danger”. The Sydney Morning Herald also said that Brodrick played “splendidly”, and “often stopped dangerous movements. He created a sensation by once hurdling an opponent and nearly scoring a try”. The Referee newspaper wrote “Tetley, the lock forward, and Brodrick, second row, menaced the home half-back, Williams, whenever the ball was secured by the Blues in the scrummage. Brodrick, a big fellow, very quick on his feet, and a brilliant tackler, was doing great work. He held his own with the huskies against him and was quicker than most of them”. Scotty McClymont, the New Zealand coach reported after the game that among several injuries “Brodrick suffered minor cuts”, and manager J.A. Redwood “revealed that a committee had been set up, consisting of the managers, coach, captain and vice-captain, and Tetley and Brodrick, to manage internal affairs and to attend to complaints and suggestions from the players”.

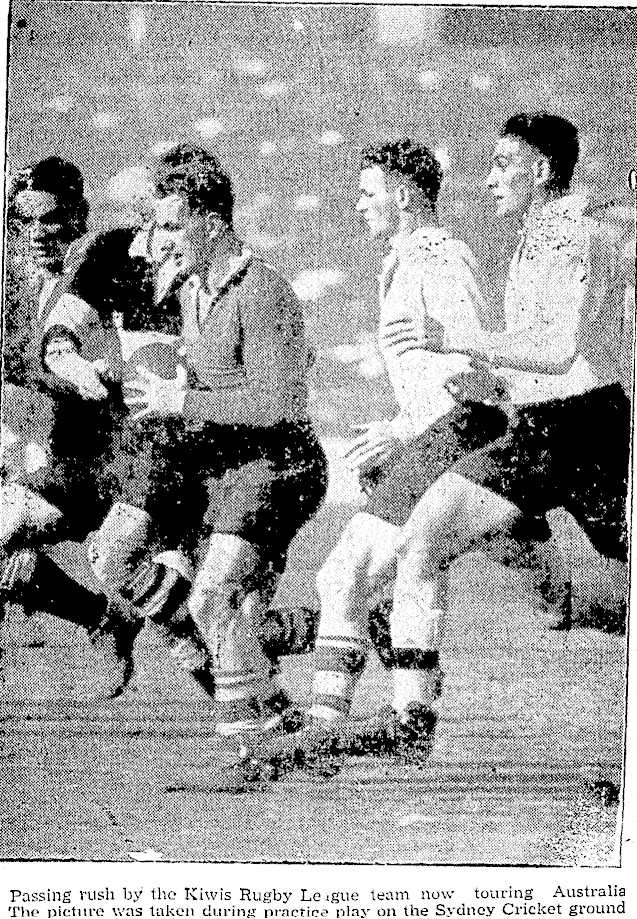
Brodrick on the right at training at the SCG.

Two days later the two sides met again at the Sydney Cricket Ground. New Zealand shocked New South Wales with a comfortable 37–18 win before 18,426 spectators. Brodrick was in the second row alongside Bill McNeight with George Kilham and Herb Narvo occupying those positions for New South Wales. The “outstanding forward was McLeod, but McNeight, Brodrick, Tetley, and Cootes were all conscientious ruckers”. With the score 12–8 to New Zealand they “came with a grand burst, in which Brodrick, McNeil and McLeod were prominent. There the ball was toed along, but Conlon missed it, and Walter Brimble, picking it up, went on to score alongside the goal”. A short time later “with the half-time bell ringing, New Zealand came with a magnificent burst, in which Brodrick was prominent”. In the second half New Zealand received a penalty after Norval was penalised for “throwing Brodrick after he had kicked the ball”. Then with the score 25–10 “Williams and Brodrick had a scuffle on the line, for which Brodrick was penalised”.

The Daily Telegraph wrote a conversation style piece on the match which featured a conversation between Vic Thicknesse and “Dinny” Campbell, which included this section on Brodrick, “Thicknesse: That Brodrick is a great forward isn’t he? I wonder where he got the habit of hurdling his opponents? Campbell: He must have read of the deeds of the great “Opie” Asher, New Zealand winger, who hurdled Batten, the Englishman in 1910. But we must not forget McLeod, as his form today was good”.

The team then travelled north to play a match at Lismore against North Coast on 15 June with Brodrick rested. On the morning of their match the team was welcomed at a civic reception in the council chambers in Lismore. The New Zealand managers, J.A. Redwood and W.O. Carlaw spoke as did captain Bill McNeight, while Brodrick “responded on behalf of the Māori members of the team and, led by him, the New Zealanders gave a war cry”.

They then moved on to Brisbane to play Queensland at the Brisbane Cricket Ground on 18 June. The day before the game the Courier Mail (Brisbane) wrote “when the giant Jack Brodrick leads his team-mates on the Brisbane Cricket Ground to-morrow, the public, however, will see a team capable of extending Queensland’s best”. Upon arriving in Brisbane the New Zealand team was quick to move to the cricket ground to train. The Queensland side finished their training around 4pm and then the “whole of the home team had a good chance to look over Brodrick, Hemi, McNeight, and company and size them up”. W. Sneyd, a staff photographer with the Telegraph wrote “another forward who will delight the cricket ground spectators is Brodrick, who played here before with the last rugby union Māori team. I saw him then, and I saw him again in Sydney, and he's better than ever. Fast and clever, he backs up like a real champion. I tip tries from this forward in every match”. In another article they said that he “is very fast, and should show out in the open”.

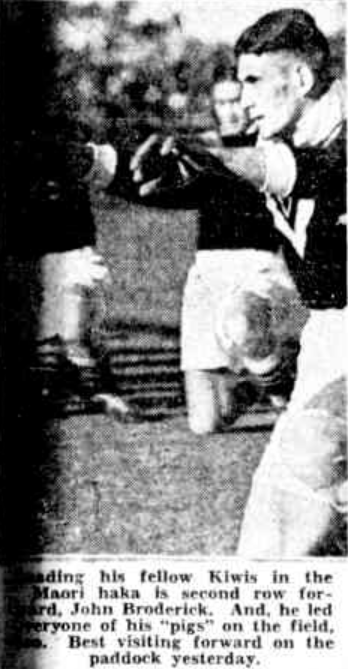
Brodrick leading the haka before the New Zealand loss to Queensland on June 18.

Contrary to all prediction the New Zealand team was soundly beaten by 31 points to 11 before 12,000 spectators on 18 June. Brodrick was in his customary position of the second row with Jack McLeod, with the Queensland second row consisting of Les Heidke and Jack Ryrie. The Telegraph said “the forwards, led by McNeight and Brodrick, held their own [but] they were simply overwhelmed in the closing stages”, and that those two players “valiantly tried to stem the rush of the Queenslanders during the second half, but they were handicapped by lack of support”. The Telegraph also reported that “valiant though were the efforts of Brodrick and McNeight, they could not cope with the grim determination and ruthless tackling of the maroons. Brodrick, particularly, did all he could in the rucks, and ran himself to a standstill in trying to stem the rushes of the Queensland backs, but there was little support for him”. One of their reporters, writing under the pseudonym of Seven-Eighths” said of Brodrick that he “was one forward with whom I could find no fault. His cover defence was first-class, and his backing up really good. That is high praise for a forward”. While the Referee publication said “Cootes, Tetley, and Brodrick were the best of the New Zealand pack”.

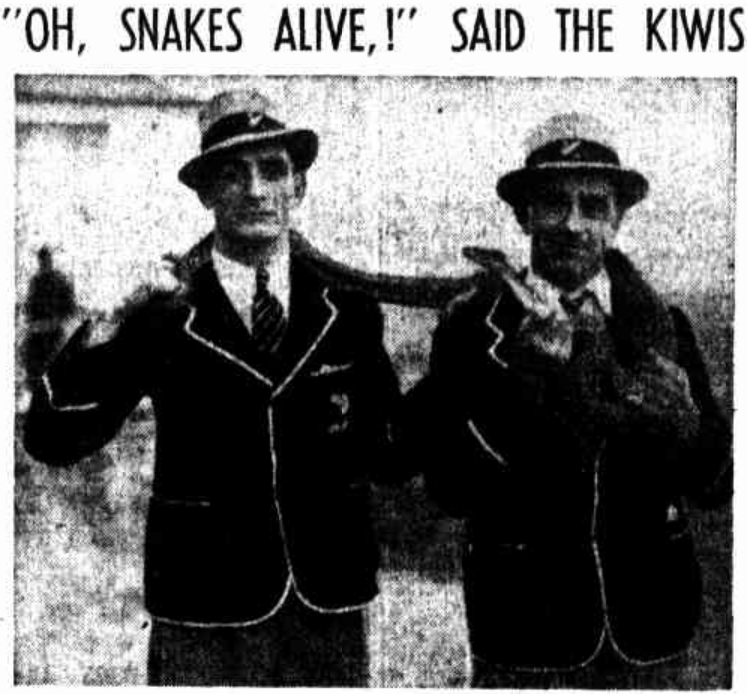
Brodrick and Jack McLeod posing with a "nine foot carpet snake" in Mount Coot-tha, Queensland.

While touring around Queensland, Brodrick and Jack McLeod posed for a photograph with a snake wrapped around their necks which was the mascot of the New South Wales Railways Rugby League team which was travelling in Queensland.

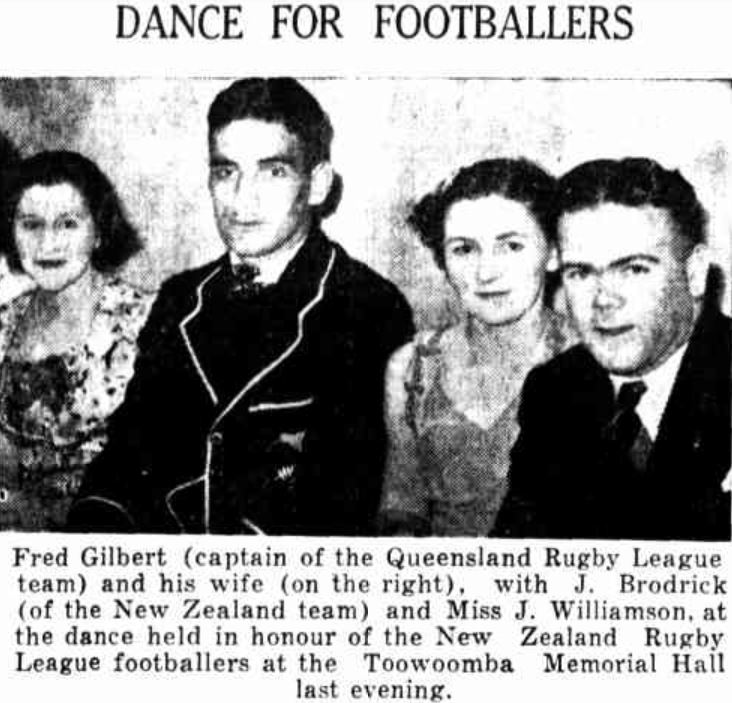
Brodrick at Toowoomba Memorial Hall at a social function on 22 June.

On 22 June New Zealand defeated Toowoomba 12–11 at the Athletic Ground in Toowoomba. Brodrick was rested from this game. Three days later on 25 June New Zealand played Queensland for the second time, again at the Brisbane Cricket Ground. The match only drew 7,000 spectators and saw Queensland win once more by 21 points to 12 after New Zealand had led 12–5 at halftime. Brodrick was back in the second row alongside Jack McLeod with Heidke and Ryrie again their opposites. The New Zealand team was once again heavily criticised for a poor performance from many players. The Truth newspaper however wrote that “in the pack and immediately astern of it, the visitors were an improved force. The forwards, with McLeod, Brodrick, and Satherley ever in the van, did try to match the might of the giant Heidke and the fire of Ryrie”. Brodrick was involved in New Zealand's second try “thanks to an impoverishment of Queensland purpose, the Kiwis went through via Brodrick (a robust runner), Tittleton, and Brown. A splendid try”. The three of the “added a nice blend of team work and handling to this successful attack”.

The Courier Mail, writing of New Zealand's improved first half effort said that “there was improvement too, in the vanguard. Orman and his front line supports got much more of the ball, while McLeod, Brodrick, and Satherley were much more convincing in intelligent forward play”.

New Zealand moved to Tamworth to play a NSW Group 4 side at the local oval. A crowd of 2,200 saw New Zealand win 26–15. The Newcastle Morning Herald and Miners’ Advocate said that Midgley, the great work of J. Anderson, and J. Brodrick in the forward division were too much for the Group side in the early stages”. The Courier Mail said that the two of them “in the forward division disconcerted the Group side early, and mistakes were quickly taken advantage of by the visitors”. The Labor Daily noted that Brodrick was “outstanding” along with Arthur Kay, Gordon Midgley, Walter Brimble, his brother Wilfred Brimble, and Anderson.

Brodrick was not selected for either of the remaining games on the tour and it would ultimately turn out to be the last time he played for New Zealand. He was named in the 9 man forward squad for the game against Newcastle on 2 July but was not chosen in the final group of 6. Jack McLeod and Bill McNeight played in the second row with John Anderson playing at lock. New Zealand won 30–19 with McLeod (2), and Anderson both scoring tries. He was not chosen for the final match of the tour, versus Sydney at the Sydney Cricket Ground. McLeod and Billy Glynn in the second row and Anderson at lock once again. The match was drawn 19–19 and New Zealand returned home.

After their return, manager Redwood commented to the press on the tour and the players. He said that “Brodrick played one sensational game in Sydney” in reference to the win over New South Wales. The side played a match against Auckland at Carlaw Park on 16 July with Auckland winning 21–13. Brodrick was named in the reserves but was not required to play with McLeod and Glynn once again preferred in the second row.

==== Manukau return ====
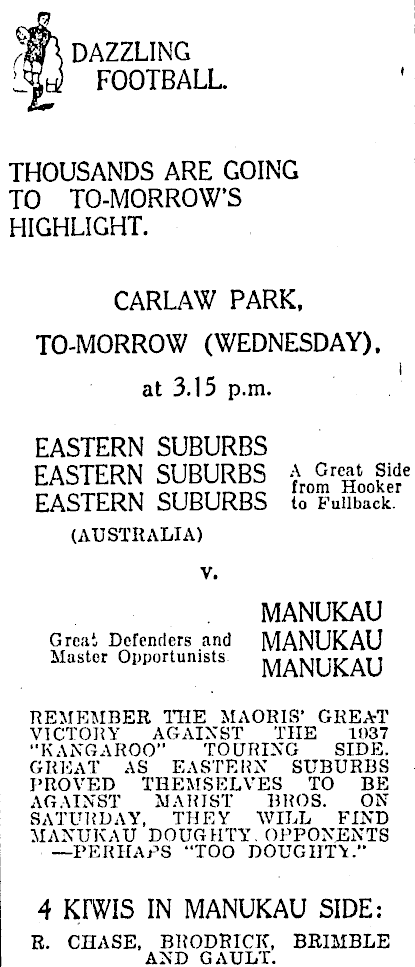
Advertisement for Manukau v Eastern Suburbs with Brodrick's name featured.

Brodrick rejoined his Manukau side for their 23 July, round 14 clash with City. Manukau won 18–4 on Carlaw Park #2 with Brodrick scoring a try. He also set up Whye for a try after he snapped up the ball and gave it to him and overall played a “good game”. The following week Brodrick played well again in a 6–6 draw with Richmond. He was “always in the picture” amongst the Manukau forwards. With the Star saying that he “was again the best Manukau loose forward”. Following their 31–5 win over Mount Albert on 6 August Brodrick was selected for the Auckland team to play Canterbury. The match was played on the same day as the round 17 club matches with only players from Manukau and Richmond selected in the Auckland side, as neither team was playing. Auckland won 28–22 in a patchy performance with Brodrick scoring one of their 6 tries. The Star wrote that “there were occasional patches of brilliance in open play by [Merv] Devine, and Brodrick”.

Manukau's final Fox Memorial round match was a 26–14 win over Ponsonby. Brodrick scored once more with it said that “a feature of the game was the brilliant play of R. Chase at centre-threequarter, and the dashing forward work of Brodrick, whose try near the end of the game was a fine effort”. They were eliminated in the Roope Rooster semi final by City, 16–8 on 10 September with Brodrick amongst “the best forwards”. He returned to try scoring ways in Manukau's Phelan Shield win over Mount Albert 26–17 and “did a lot of good work”. In the semi final of the Phelan Shield Brodrick scored twice in their 26–8 win over Ponsonby. He was in the centre position and “played splendidly”, scoring “a fine try after a spectacular run from half-way”. His final match of the season was in Manukau's game against the Eastern Suburbs team from Sydney on 28 September. They had finished the 1938 NSWRFL competition as runner up and were touring Auckland. The Eastern Suburbs side won 16–7. Brodrick had to leave the field during the first half with a shoulder injury, being replaced by Ratu. He then missed their Phelan Shield final win over Papakura 3 days later due to his injury.

=== Manukau and Auckland Māori (1939) ===
The 1939 season saw Brodrick play 16 times for Manukau, scoring 7 tries, and he also made three representative appearances for Auckland Māori. He was a surprise omission from the New Zealand team to tour England in the middle stages of the year. Although the tour was aborted after two matches due to the outbreak of World War 2. The season began early on 1 April with Manukau losing to Ponsonby 29–22. Brodrick scored one of their four tries. His try came after a “strong dash”, then later he nearly scored, breaking away on his own “only to lose the ball in the goal area”. Two weeks later Manukau played the touring side from Sydney. Their opponents were made up from several teams. The Sydney XIII won 23 to 10. The Auckland Star said that “Brodrick was the outstanding forward of the match”. The Herald also said that he played well “but was inclined to go a little too far”. In the second half he made a spectacular run but passed “wildly to [Cyril] Wiberg” and the chance was lost, then later on he dropped a pass from George Nēpia after he had made a long run, but Wiberg collected the ball though and scored. Against Papakura in a 20–0 win he “played a fine game” and he along with Angus Gault and Pita Ririnui “played as well as the three quarters” with Ririnui and Brodrick showing “outstanding form”.

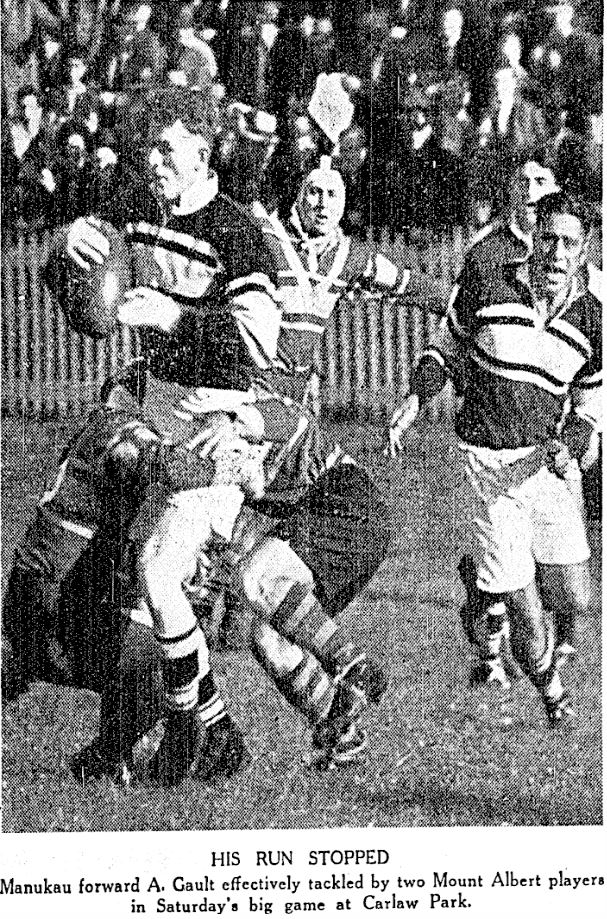
Brodrick in the background trailing in support of Angus Gault, with Tommy Chase close by in Manukau's game with Mount Albert.

The next week in a 23–7 win over North Shore he scored twice and was once again “the outstanding forward and in the loose play was brilliant”. One of his tries came after he broke through and then broke the tackle of North Shore fullback Jack Smith to score. He played another fine game in a 38–15 loss to Mount Albert, scoring another try. Following a 15–5 loss to Richmond the Auckland Star said that “[Merv] Devine for Richmond and Brodrick for Manukau were outstanding in loose play, a pair that should be well in the running when the representative team is chosen”.

On 24 May the Herald wrote a piece naming in form players to that point of the season with Brodrick among the 17 forwards that they named. Days later in a 16–10 loss to Newton Rangers he “stood out among the [Manukau] pack”.

He was selected by Ernie Asher in the Auckland Māori (Tāmaki) team for their first match of the year against South Auckland (Waikato) to play on 28 May. There was no coverage of the match whatsoever, though the score was 19–8 to South Auckland with the game played at Davies Park in Huntly. He next played in a 26–11 win over Marist and scored a try. And yet again he was among the “best of the forwards”. After the match he was chosen initially at prop for the Auckland Māori team to play Auckland Pākehā. But the forwards were shuffled and he was then named at second row with Jack Tristram. It was said that “in Ririnui and Brodrick the Maori team can boast two fine players with strong claims for New Zealand selection”.

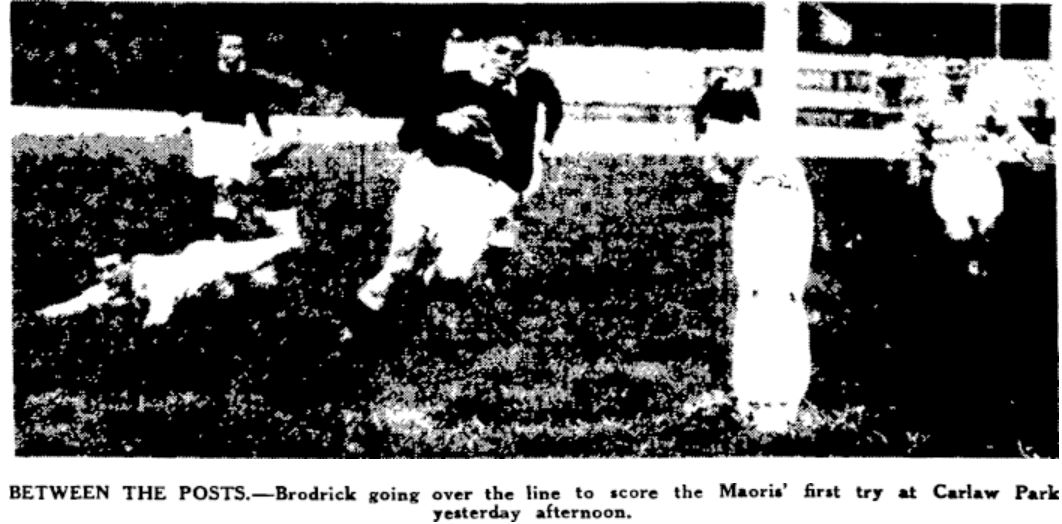

The Māori side won 19–15 with Brodrick scoring once and being “great in the loose play”. A photograph of him crossing for his try under the posts was published in the Auckland Star the following day. The Herald suggested that Brodrick “seems a certainty for one of the second row forward positions, as he played a fine game… he should however refrain from hurdling a tackler- a practice which is most dangerous”.

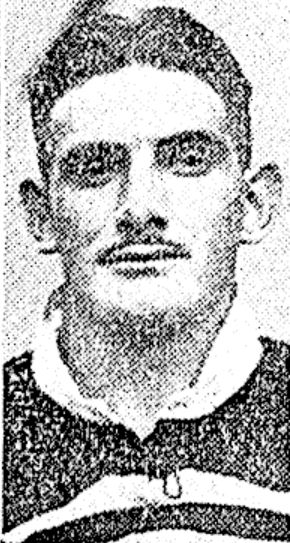
Portrait photo of Brodrick in a Manukau jersey which appeared in the Herald on 24 June 1939 after their match with Papakura.

He was injured in the game and did not play until their game with Papakura 19 days later, missing two matches for Manukau and one for Auckland Māori. Manukau won 24–16 at Waikaraka Park in Onehunga. Brodrick, along with teammate Pita Ririnui, and Harold Milliken of Papakura were said to have been “responsible for some of the finest play seen in the code for a considerable time”. Ririnui and Brodrick were “in brilliant form”, and “all three forwards have excellent prospects of selection in the New Zealand team”. They next week “Brodrick starred in the loose play” in a 19–5 loss to North Shore. He combined with George Nēpia in taking the ball “right downfield with inter-passing” before Pita Mahima worked the blindside for Wiberg to score. Brodrick and Ririnui “were outstanding in the forwards, but found their weight and pace of little advantage against resolute tackling”.

In a surprise Brodrick was not named in the North Island team to play the South Island, and was only named in the reserves for the Probables v Possibles curtain raiser to be played beforehand. The Herald wrote “the greatest surprises are the omission of the two Auckland forwards, J. Brodrick (Manukau), and [Clarrie] Petersen (Ponsonby), … both Brodrick and Petersen have bene playing outstanding football, and yet are not included among 24 forwards chosen”. In a 21–19 loss to Mt Albert on 15 July Brodrick nearly won the game but was repelled twice from the try line by good tackling from Bruce Donaldson and Bob Banham. The Herald wrote that “Brodrick revealed possibilities as a wing-three quarter, and the New Zealand team could be strengthened in this position”. He played on the wing again the next week against Richmond, scoring a try in the corner in their 23–14 win and reportedly “played a good game”. Then in a 9–9 draw with City he scored again after starting the match once more on the wing. His try came after Nēpia, playing in the centres, made a break for Brodrick to score. The game was on the number 2 field at Carlaw Park and after a heavy hailstorm it became a quagmire with Brodrick moving into the front row where he was “prominent”.

Brodrick was unavailable for Manukau's nest two matches and didn't make his return to the field until their Roope Rooster match with Papakura on 2 September. he gave a “dashing display” in their 27–12 win. Brodrick missed several matches after this, including some representative fixtures before being named in the Auckland Māori squad to play Auckland Pākehā on 30 September. Auckland Pākehā won the match 15 to 12. With the Māori side down 10–2 at halftime their “forwards, led by Watene and Brodrick, showed a lot of dash in the early part of the second half”. Those two, along with Jack Tristram were said to have been the best Māori forwards.

=== Retirement (1940-44) ===
The 1940 season was to be the last of any significance for Brodrick. He played 12 games for Manukau, scoring six tries and one game for Auckland Māori. He played on the wing in their round 1 win over City by 11 points to 2. The Herald commented that “both Ririnui and Brodrick appeared in the Manukau backs, but despite what they achieved, their proper place is in the forwards”. The Herald said he “showed all of his former dash on the wing”, and made “an exciting dash down the touch line”. He moved back into the forwards for their 23–7 win over Mount Albert and was “prominent”. His second try of the season came in a 30–17 loss to Marist before a crowd of 4,000. He was said to have “foraged successfully” in the forwards. In a 4–4 draw with Richmond in round 4 he stood out along with Freddie Maguire. The following week he was “conspicuous in a bright contest” which saw Manukau beat Ponsonby 15–4.

Brodrick was then selected in the Auckland Māori squad to play against South Auckland (Waikato) on 26 May in Huntly. There was relatively little coverage of the match, with South Auckland winning 22 to 20. The day before Brodrick had been chosen to run in a relay race as a part of a Gala Day at Carlaw Park to raise money for the Sick and Wounded Soldiers’ Campaign. The race featured a soccer team competing against a rugby league team made up of Roy Nurse, Robert Cheater, Brodrick, and one of the Gould brothers from City. The soccer team won after the baton change was messed up for the rugby league teams final leg when a close finish was likely. On 15 June Brodrick scored a try in Manukau's 25–16 win over Papakura at Waikaraka Park. Papakura led before Brodrick and Tom Chase “turned the game in favour of Manukau”. The Manukau forwards were commented on after a 14–8 win over Newton on 22 June. The Auckland Star wrote about their enormous size and Puti Tipene Watene said to be 17 stone 2 pounds, with Peter Ririnui and J Marsh both over 16 stone. With “fourth man of the heavy-weight brigade [being] John Brodrick, the former Bay of Plenty player, and star of the Māori team of 1935, which went to Australia. But as Brodrick weights only 14.7 he can be regarded as a lightweight”.

The next game saw a large crowd of 9,000 see competition leaders North Shore beat Manukau 12–7 with Brodrick scoring Manukau's only try and “showing up among the forwards”. They then beat City 18–12 with Brodrick scoring again. In a short piece on Brodrick titled “Brodrick Can Handle” the Auckland Star said “two characteristics mark J. Brodrick, the Manukau forward, who played a grand game for Manukau against City. He fields a ball like a first class clip in a cricket match, and he knows how to lengthen his stride to get over the ground…”. Brodrick scored a try for the third consecutive week in a 19–5 loss to Mount Albert. He played another “good game” in a 20–10 loss to Marist on 20 July. The day after the Manukau side travelled to Davies Park in Huntly to play South Auckland and won 19–14. Brodrick was injured in the first half and replaced by Briggs who was actually from the Ponsonby side. It was to be his last game of the season. The nature of his injury was not reported, though it may have been fairly serious as he missed 10 games. He was eventually named in a Manukau lineup for an 19 October friendly rugby match in Tauranga but didn't ultimately play.

In the 1941 season Brodrick only played in one match. It was Manukau's friendly rugby game against Te Kohanga on 23 August at their opponents ground. The game was to assist Princess Te Puea in raising money for the patriotic funds with the Manukau team winning 37–6. In 1942 he also made three appearances for Manukau. The first was in a 2 May match against Richmond. With World War 2 causing huge issues with playing numbers with so many young men away fighting there were many occasions where sides were assisted by former players to field full senior sides. In this case the match was a preseason game with Manukau winning 25–8. The Auckland Star wrote “after being out of the game for one season, J. Brodrick played for Manukau against Richmond and was the outstanding forward in loose play. Brodrick is tall, heavy, fast, and can juggle with the ball. He is one of a few forwards who can get backs going by throwing out a long pass from ruck play”. The second game was for Manukau against Wellington at the Basin Reserve in Wellington in a friendly tour match. Manukau won 23 to 17 with Brodrick scoring one of their five tries. His last game for them was in the Stormont Shield final on September 26 against Richmond. Manukau won 11 points to 6. The Auckland Star said that Jack Brodrick played and "his colourful play found high favour with the spectators".

Then two years later he again turned out for Manukau in a solitary match on 26 August against Point Chevalier. Manukau were in contention for the championship following their 21–13 win at the match played at Onehunga Primary School. The following week they lost to Mount Albert who would go on to beat City in the final a week after with Manukau finishing 3rd. Brodrick was living in the Onehunga area at this time of his life. He was described as “the mainstay” of the heavy forward line along with Pita Ririnui in the match with Point Chevalier. There was no mention of Brodrick playing beyond this point, finishing with 74 games for Manukau, spread over 8 years.

== Personal life ==
After moving to Auckland to play rugby league Brodrick lived in the Onehunga suburb which was on the northern shores of the Manukau Harbour. On 16 March 1932, Jack married Maud Josephine Semmens. In 1932 Brodrick and his wife Maud Josephine Brodrick had a son named Ernest Purewa Brodrick (1932–2007). On 15 March 1940, Jack's mother, Te Pari Tiakiwai Broderick died. The Onehunga General Roll of 1941 showed that he was living with Maud, working as a labourer and living at 286 Queen Street (Onehunga). Queen Street was later renamed Onehunga Mall. The 1943, 1946, and 1949 electoral rolls that they continued to live at the same address with Brodrick continuing in his occupation as a labourer. The 1957 and 1960 electoral rolls showed that he had moved to Panmure and was now living with Maud at 4 Tobruk Road. His occupation was now lineman.

=== Death ===
John (Jack) Brodrick died on 11 March 1965, in Auckland and was buried at Ōtāhuhu in plot M/46. In cemetery records it said "Broderick John Purewa, a. 51 yrs d.11.3.1965 Treasured memories of a beloved husband and father John Purewa Brodrick died 11 March 1965 aged 51 years. Always remembered by your loving wife Maud. (Jacobson Ltd, Onehunga). Maud died on 22 February 1988, in Auckland, while their son Ernest died on 2 September 2007. Ernest had fought in the Korean War in the early 1950s.
