= Bill Mahon =

Australian rugby league footballer (1910–1979)

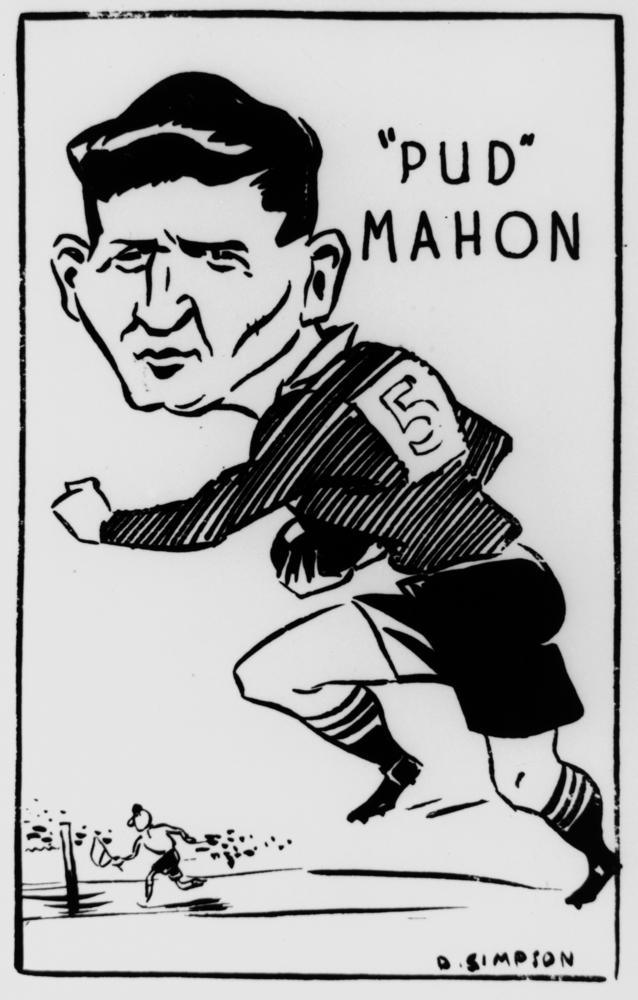

Personal information
- Full name: William Charles Edward Mahon
- Born: 7 July 1910 Dalby, Queensland, Australia
- Died: 8 September 1979 (aged 69)

Playing information
- Position: Wing
Representative
Years	Team	Pld	T	G	FG	P
1933–36	Queensland	17	9	0	0	27
1935	Australia	1	0	0	0	0

William Charles Edward Mahon (7 July 1910 – 8 September 1979) was an Australian rugby league footballer.

== Biography ==
Mahon was born in Dalby and played his early rugby league in the town of Jandowae.

A winger, Mahon made his interstate debut for Queensland in their 1933 interstate series against New South Wales and scored the winning try in the final fixture at The Gabba. He was playing his rugby league in Toowoomba when he earned a Kangaroos call up for the 1935 tour of New Zealand, where he secured a hat–trick against a New Zealand XIII. His only capped appearance on tour came as a centre, in partnership with captain Dave Brown, for the first of the three international fixtures against New Zealand.

Mahon became an agricultural auctioneer.
