= Henry Bichel =

Australian rugby league footballer (1911–1995)

Personal information
- Full name: Harold Frank Bichel
- Born: 3 September 1911
- Died: 7 March 1995 (aged 83)

Playing information
- Position: Front row / Second row
Representative
Years	Team	Pld	T	G	FG	P
1934–37	Queensland	11	2	13	0	32
1935	Australia

Harold Frank Bichel (3 September 1911 – 7 March 1995) was an Australian rugby league footballer.

Bichel, a forward, mainly featured in the front and second row. He was also a capable goal–kicker.

In 1935, Bichel was the sole Ipswich representative on Australia's tour of New Zealand, where he scored a try in a non–international against a New Zealand XIII in Hawera. He wasn't called upon for the three Test matches.

Bichel had a stint with Mackay in the late 1930s, before continuing his career coaching in Cairns and later serving as a North Queensland selector. He returned south in 1947.
