= Edward Collins (rugby league) =

Australian rugby league footballer (1911–1992)

Personal information
- Full name: Edward Henry Louis Collins
- Born: 9 June 1911 Rockhampton, Queensland, Australia
- Died: 22 June 1992 (aged 81)

Playing information
- Position: Lock, Second-row
Representative
Years	Team	Pld	T	G	FG	P
1932–41	Queensland	36	31	0	0	93
1937	Australia	1	0	0	0	0

Edward Henry Louis Collins (9 June 1911 – 22 June 1992) was an Australian rugby league footballer.

Known by the nickname "Babe", Collins was a Rockhampton–born lock forward who played primarily for Brisbane club Norths. He gained international representative honours on the 1935 Kangaroo tour of New Zealand and featured again on their 1937–38 tour of Great Britain, both times playing a peripheral role. His only capped match came against the 1937 Māori team on a stopover in New Zealand. In 1940, Collins scored 39 tries in a premiership–winning season for Norths and was man of the match in their grand final win over Brothers. He proved a reliable try scorer for Brisbane in the Bulimba Cup and in his regular appearances for Queensland, which he captain–coached to an interstate series win.

Collins had his representative career ended by World War II. He enlisted in the army in 1941 and served as a private with the 7th Field Ambulance. The following year, Collins joined the Royal Australian Air Force and was posted to RAAF Base Richmond. He remained in the RAAF after the war as an air traffic controller.
