= Eric Lewis (rugby league) =

Australian rugby league footballer and coach

Personal information
- Full name: Eric William Lewis
- Born: 20 September 1909 Sydney, New South Wales, Australia
- Died: 17 April 1959 (aged 49) Surry Hills, New South Wales, Australia

Playing information
- Position: Second-row, Prop
Club
Years	Team	Pld	T	G	FG	P
1931	Griffith
1932–37	South Sydney	76	7	1	0	47
	Total	76	7	1	0	47
Representative
Years	Team	Pld	T	G	FG	P
1935–37	New South Wales	11	5	0	0	15
1935–38	Australia	9	0	0	0	0
1933–37	NSW City	7	0	0	0	0
1938	NSW Country	1	0	0	0	0

Coaching information
Club
Years	Team	Gms	W	D	L	W%
1945	South Sydney	14	1	0	13	7

Eric William Lewis (20 September 1909 – 17 April 1959) was an Australian rugby league footballer who played in the 1930s. A New South Wales interstate and Australian international representative forward, he played club football in the NSWRFL for South Sydney, winning the 1932 Premiership with them, and later coaching them.

== Playing career ==
Lewis started playing for Waverley's Christian Brothers club before spending a season playing in Griffith in 1931. He then returned to Sydney, and joined South Sydney Rabbitohs, where he would remain for six seasons. At the end of the 1932 NSWRFL season, Lewis' first in the top grade, he played in the premiership Final for Souths, scoring a try in their 19–12 victory over Western Suburbs.

Lewis played for Souths in the 1935 NSWRFL season's premiership final loss to Eastern Suburbs. After that he toured New Zealand with the Australian national team, becoming Kangaroo No. 200. Lewis was selected to go on October's 1935 Kangaroo tour of New Zealand and played in the 2nd and 3rd Test matches, both victories, against the Kiwis.

Lewis was captain of South Sydney for the 1936 and 1935 NSWRFL premiership seasons.

Lewis was a member of the 1937–38 Kangaroo tour's Australian side to England and France. The French leg of this tour helped establish rugby league in France.

== Post-playing ==
After returning from war duties in early 1945, Eric Lewis stepped in to coach Souths for the 1945 NSWRFL season at a time when many players and coaches were absent because of the war. The South Sydney Rabbitohs line up was so disrupted, that no constant club captain was named during the season. Often, the captain was named on game day depending on who was available to play. The club only won one game during 1945.

In Papua New Guinea during World War II, Lewis spotted Jack Rayner playing inter-regiment rugby league on a muddy field at Port Moresby and invited him to trial with South Sydney when he got home. Rayner went on to captain and coach Souths, becoming an important figure in the club's history.

Lewis was long time resident of the Baine family's Dolphin Hotel in Surry Hills, New South Wales and lived there until his death which was widely mourned by South Sydney fans. He was buried at Botany Cemetery on 20 April 1959.
