= Frank Curran (rugby league) =

Australia international rugby league footballer

Personal information
- Full name: Francis Joseph Curran
- Born: 6 March 1908 Ballina, New South Wales, Australia
- Died: 7 October 1985 (aged 77) Ballina, New South Wales, Australia

Playing information
- Position: Prop
Club
Years	Team	Pld	T	G	FG	P
1931–37	South Sydney	71	16	1	0	50
Representative
Years	Team	Pld	T	G	FG	P
1933–37	NSW City	7	3	0	0	9
1932–36	New South Wales	18	4	0	0	12
1935–38	Australia	10	1	0	0	3
1928	NSW Country	1	0	0	0	0
1932	Metropolis	2	0	0	0	0
- Source: As of 14 May 2020

Francis Joseph Curran (6 March 1908 – 7 October 1985) was an Australian rugby league footballer who played in the 1930s. An Australian international representative, he played club football for South Sydney in the NSWRFL Premiership as well as in country New South Wales.

== Playing career ==
A star schoolboy footballer at De La Salle College in Armidale, Curran played for Ballina's Rovers club before moving to Sydney. He started playing first grade for Souths in the 1931 NSWRFL season. At the end of the season he played in the premiership final-winning Souths team. It was back-to-back premierships for South Sydney, with Curran playing in the 1932 premiership final as well. In 1933 Curran was first selected to represent Australia, for the 1933–34 Kangaroo tour of Great Britain becoming Kangaroo No. 182. That season he also played representative football for Sydney, and then New South Wales. The 1937 NSWRFL season was Curran's last with South Sydney. He was selected to go on the Kangaroo tour of 1937–38. Curran became the first Australian player to score on French soil in a Test match in 1938.

Frank's son, Declan Curran, played rugby union for Australia.
