= Ray Hines =

Australia international rugby league player

Personal information
- Full name: Edward John Hines
- Born: 7 April 1912 Gunning, NSW, Australia
- Died: 27 September 1984 (aged 72) Randwick, New South Wales, Australia

Playing information
- Position: Wing
Club
Years	Team	Pld	T	G	FG	P
1934–37	Western Suburbs	25	15	0	0	45
1939	South Sydney	3	0	0	0	0
	Total	28	15	0	0	45
Representative
Years	Team	Pld	T	G	FG	P
1935	New South Wales	6	7	0	0	21
1935	Australia	3	3	0	0	9

Edward John "Ray" Hines (7 April 1912 – 27 September 1984) was an Australian rugby league player.

Born in Gunning, New South Wales, Hines was raised in the nearby town of Dalton and in 1933 moved to Sydney, linking up with Western Suburbs. He made his first-grade debut in 1934, a premiership season for Western Suburbs, but lost his place on the wing to Vince Sheehan by the grand final.

Hines returned to the country in 1935 to play for Maitland, where he had a standout season, earning NSW Country, NSW and Australia representative honours. He starred for NSW with four tries against Queensland and played all three internationals on Australia's tour of New Zealand, scoring two tries in the 2nd Test at Carlaw Park.

Resuming at Western Suburbs in 1936, Hines had two more seasons with the Magpies, then one first-grade season playing for South Sydney, but further representative honours eluded him.
