= Gordon Whittle =

Australian rugby league footballer (1912–1991)

Personal information
- Born: 13 September 1912 Pittsworth, Queensland, Australia
- Died: 24 June 1991 (aged 78)

Playing information
- Position: Fullback
Representative
Years	Team	Pld	T	G	FG	P
1933–38	Queensland	16	0	0	0	0
1935–37	Australia

Gordon Whittle (13 September 1912 – 24 June 1991) was an Australian rugby league footballer.

Whittle was born and raised in the Queensland town of Pittsworth.

A fullback, Whittle began his career with the South End club and first earned Toowoomba representative honours at the age of 17. He appeared for a South Queensland representative side in 1931 and two years later debuted for Queensland, when state selectors opted to field the entire Toowoomba side against New South Wales. Despite undertaking two tours with the Kangaroos, to New Zealand in 1935 and Great Britain in 1937, Whittle didn't receive a Test cap for Australia, with his appearances limited to the minor matches.
