= Laurie Ward =

Australian international rugby league footballer (born 1911)

Personal information
- Full name: Lawrence Robert Ward
- Born: 27 March 1911 Goulburn, New South Wales, Australia

Playing information
Club
Years	Team	Pld	T	G	FG	P
1933	Eastern Suburbs	15	2	0	0	6
1937	North Sydney	8	1	0	0	3
	Total	23	3	0	0	9
Representative
Years	Team	Pld	T	G	FG	P
1933–37	New South Wales	11	0	0	0	0
1935–38	Australia	10	0	0	0	0

Coaching information
Club
Years	Team	Gms	W	D	L	W%
1937	North Sydney	8	3	0	5	38

Lawrence Robert Ward (born 27 March 1911, date of death unknown) was a professional rugby league footballer in the Australian New South Wales Rugby League (NSWRL) competition in the 1930s, a state and national representative full-back.

== Playing career ==
Originally from Goulburn, New South Wales, the fast and elusive back moved to Sydney in 1933, joined Eastern Suburbs and played 15 matches for the club. Ward was selected to play for New South Wales in 1933 before leaving Sydney for Maitland where he played seasons 1934 & 1935. He was selected at full back for Country Firsts in the inaugural City v Country clash staged by CRL on 26 May 1934 and the following year was selected for the national side making his Test debut in 1935 on the tour of New Zealand playing in all three Tests of the tour. He is listed on the Australian Players Register as Kangaroo No. 196.

In 1937 captain-coached North Sydney and that season was selected for the 1937-38 Kangaroo tour playing in all seven Tests of the tour – three against England and two against each of New Zealand and France.

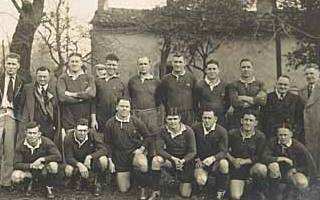
The 1937–38 Kangaroos

== Published sources ==
- Whiticker, Alan; Hudson, Glen (2007). The Encyclopedia of Rugby League Players. Wetherill Park, New South Wales: Gary Allen Pty Ltd. p. 609. ISBN 978-1-877082-93-1.

Sporting positions
Preceded by Jim Craig; 1936	Coach North Sydney; 1937	Succeeded by Bob Williams; 1938–1939
