= 1937–38 Kangaroo tour =

Rugby league tour (1937–1938)

- Manager: Harry Sunderland; Robert Savage
- Tour captain(s): Wally Prigg
- Top point scorer(s): Jack Beaton 116
- Top try scorer(s): Wally Prigg 13; Jack Reardon 13
- Top test point scorer(s): Jack Beaton 21
- Top test try scorer(s): Len Dawson 3 Doug McLean Jr. 3 Andy Norval 3
Summary
P	W	D	L
Total
38	23	1	14
Test match
7	4	0	3
Opponent
P	W	D	L
New Zealand
2	1	0	1
England
3	1	0	2
France
2	2	0	0

Tour chronology
- Previous tour: 1933-34
- Next tour: 1948-49

The 1937–38 Kangaroo tour was the sixth Kangaroo tour, in which the Australian national rugby league team travelled to New Zealand, Great Britain and France and played thirty-eight matches, including the Ashes series of three Test matches against Great Britain, and two Test matches each against the Kiwis and French. It followed the tour of 1933-34. Following a cessation of overseas international tours due to World War II, the next tour was staged in 1948-49.

== The squad's leadership ==
The team was selected with Wally Prigg as captain and Jack Reardon as vice-captain. Tour co-managers were Harry Sunderland and Robert Savage.

== Touring squad ==
The Rugby League News published headshots of the touring party, including the managers, in successive issues: July 3, July 10, and July 17. The names, weight and height of the players was also published. Collins, Gilbert, Heidke, McLean, Reardon, Robison, and Whittle were selected from Queensland clubs. Dawson, Gibbs, Hazelton, Prigg and Bert Williams were selected from clubs in New South Wales Country areas. The balance of the squad had played for Sydney-based clubs during the 1937 season.

Notes:

- Tallies in the table below are compiled from match reports that appeared in Australian newspapers. Most articles were provided by the Australian Associated Press and were amended by local editors. Claude Corbett was present for the England leg of the tour, reporting for The Sun, Sydney and the Telegraph, Brisbane. Tour Manager Harry Sunderland provided articles for The Courier-Mail, Brisbane.
- For nearly all matches, one or more newspapers listed the Australian team with the match report. An exception is the match against Catalans. The point-scorers in the Catalans match include two players who were not named in the team prior to the match. Consequently, 15 players are included in the tallies for the Catalans match.
- Under the rules of the time, teams were limited to 13 players, with no ability to replace injured players.
- Following a broken leg injury to Joe Pearce, sustained during the Second Test match in New Zealand, Herb Narvo was added to the squad. Narvo travelled to England separately from the touring party. Joe Pearce was permitted to continue with the group, and he travelled with the team to England and France.

Player	Position	Age	Weight	Club	Tests on Tour	Games	Tries	Goals	FG	Points
Jack Beaton	Wing, Centre	24	12.7 (79)	Eastern Suburbs	7	27	6	49	0	116
Edward Collins	Lock, Second-row	26	13.3 (84)	North Brisbane	0	7	8	0	0	24
Frank Curran	Prop	27	14.12 (94)	South Sydney	4	17	4	0	0	12
Len Dawson	Wing	22	11.12 (75)	Newcastle Eastern Suburbs	5	24	11	0	0	33
Percy Fairall	Hooker	28	11.3 (71)	St George	0	14	1	1	0	5
Jim Gibbs	Prop, Second-row	28	14.0 (89)	South Newcastle	4	17	2	0	0	6
Fred Gilbert	Halfback	26	11.7 (73)	Toowoomba Valleys	3	16	5	4	0	23
Frank Griffiths	Prop	26	14.6 (92)	Balmain	0	11	2	0	0	6
Charlie Hazelton	Wing	19	12.6 (79)	Port Kembla	1	14	9	0	0	27
Les Heidke	Prop	29	15.0 (95)	Ipswich Rialto	4	22	1	0	0	3
Eric Lewis	Second-row	28	13.4 (84)	South Sydney	7	19	3	0	0	9
Ross McKinnon	Centre	23	13.8 (86)	Eastern Suburbs	6	29	10	10	0	50
Doug McLean Jr.	Wing	25	12.2 (77)	Ipswich Starlights	2	8	3	0	0	9
Gordon McLennan	Second-row	23	13.9 (87)	Newtown	0	16	1	0	0	3
Herb Narvo	Second-row	25	. (0)	Newtown	4	22	10	0	0	30
Fred Nolan	Prop, Hooker	24	12.7 (79)	North Sydney	2	9	1	0	0	3
Ernie Norman	Five-eighth	25	11.3 (71)	Eastern Suburbs	4	24	5	0	0	15
Andy Norval	Lock	25	13.3 (84)	Eastern Suburbs	3	16	9	0	0	27
Joe Pearce	Second-row	26	15.7 (98)	Eastern Suburbs	2	2	0	0	0	0
Harry Pierce	Hooker	25	13.10 (87)	Eastern Suburbs	5	18	7	0	0	21
Wally Prigg	Lock	29	13.5 (85)	Central Newcastle	7	29	13	0	0	39
Jack Reardon	Five-eighth, Centre	22	12.4 (78)	North Brisbane	4	26	13	2	0	43
Harry Robison	Wing	25	12.0 (76)	Toowoomba Newtown	0	13	2	0	0	6
Ray Stehr	Prop, Hooker	25	14.4 (91)	Eastern Suburbs	3	18	3	0	0	9
Roy Thompson	Five-eighth, Halfback	21	10.8 (67)	North Sydney	0	8	1	2	0	7
Laurie Ward	Fullback	26	12.7 (79)	North Sydney	7	27	2	0	0	6
Gordon Whittle	Fullback	25	10.6 (66)	Toowoomba Newtown	0	12	1	0	0	3
Bert Williams	Wing, Centre	23	13.2 (83)	Bombala	3	15	5	0	0	15
Percy Williams	Halfback	27	9.12 (63)	South Sydney	4	16	2	18	0	42

== Nez Zealand leg ==
=== 1st Test ===
August 7

New Zealand	8–12	Australia
Tries: 2 Noel Bickerton; Cec Davison; Goals: 1 Cec Davison		Tries: 4 Charlie Hazelton (2); Doug McLean Jr. Ray Stehr; Goals: nil

Carlaw Park, Auckland
Attendance: 20,000
Referee: Morris Wetherill (New Zealand)

August 11	New Zealand Māori	16–5	Australia	Carlaw Park, Auckland
	Tries: 5 R Brodrick (2); Goals: 2 George Nēpia (4); Jack Hemi	[ Report]	Tries: 1 Frank Curran; Goals: 1 Jack Beaton	Attendance: 11,000; Referee: P. Rogers

=== 2nd Test ===
August 14

New Zealand	16–15	Australia
Tries: 4 Cec Davison (2); Noel Bickerton; Jack Satherley; Goals: 2 George Nēpia (2)		Tries: 3 Doug McLean Jr. (2); Fred Nolan; Goals: 3 Percy Williams (2); Jack Beaton

Carlaw Park, Auckland
Attendance: 25,000
Referee: Morris Wetherill (New Zealand)

== England leg ==
Matches scheduled in December 1937 against Castleford, Cumberland, Hull Kingston Rovers and Hunslet were abandoned or cancelled due to snow or fog.

September 18	Leigh	9–11	Australia	Mather Lane, Leigh
	Tries: 1 Lomas; Goals: 3 Thompson (2); Lomas	[ Report]	Tries: 3 Ernie Norman; Ross McKinnon; Charlie Hazelton; Goals: 1 Percy Williams	Attendance: 5,000; Gate: £ 310; Referee: Albert Harding

September 22	York	6–15	Australia	Wigginton Road, York
6:00pm	Tries: nil Goals: 3 Taylor (2); Milner	[ Report]	Tries: 3 Andy Norval; Edward Collins; Jack Reardon; Goals: 3 Fred Gilbert (2); Jack Beaton	Attendance: 5,000; Gate: £ 303; Referee: Peel

September 25	Newcastle Firsts	0–37	Australia	Brough Park, Newcastle
	Tries: nil Goals: nil	[ Report]	Tries: 9 Len Dawson (4); Bert Williams (3); Wally Prigg; Roy Thompson; Goals: 5 Ross McKinnon (4); Roy Thompson	Attendance: 4,000; Gate: £ 212

September 29	Lancashire	7–5	Australia	Wilderspool Stadium, Warrington
	Tries: 1 Croston; Goals: 2 Belshaw (2)	[ Report]	Tries: 1 Ross McKinnon; Goals: 1 Jack Beaton	Attendance: 16,250; Gate: £ 1,462; Referee: Devine

October 2	Halifax	12–2	Australia	Thrum Hall, Halifax
	Tries: 2 Charlie Smith; Treen; Goals: 2 Lockwood (2); Field Goals: 1 Elias	[ Report]	Tries: nil Goals: 1 Fred Gilbert	Attendance: 14,500; Gate: £ 914; Referee: Holbrook

October 6	Yorkshire	4–8	Australia	Odsal Stadium, Bradford
	Tries: nil Goals: 2 Lockwood (2)	[ Report]	Tries: 2 Eric Lewis; Harry Robison; Goals: 1 Percy Williams	Attendance: 7,570; Gate: £ 631

October 9	Wakefield Trinity	10–17	Australia	Belle Vue, Wakefield
	Tries: 2 Whitworth; Watson; Goals: 2 Teall (2)	[ Report]	Tries: 3 Jack Beaton; Andy Norval; Jack Reardon; Goals: 4 Jack Beaton (4)	Attendance: 8,696; Gate: £ 654

October 13	Rochdale Hornets	0–6	Australia	Athletic Grounds, Rochdale
	Tries: nil Goals: nil	[ Report]	Tries: 2 Jack Beaton; Harry Pierce; Goals: nil	Attendance: 2,400; Gate: £ 186

=== 1st Test ===
October 16

England	5–4	Australia
Tries: 1 Emlyn Jenkins; Goals: 1 Martin Hodgson		Tries: nil Goals: 2 Jack Beaton (2)

Headingley, Leeds
Attendance: 31,949
Gate: £ 3,982
Referee: Albert Harding (England)

October 21	Widnes	13–13	Australia	Naughton Park, Widnes
	Tries: 3 Higgins; Roberts; Barber; Goals: 2 Topping (2)	[ Report]	Tries: 3 Andy Norval; Gordon McLennan; Len Dawson; Goals: 2 Jack Beaton (2)	Attendance: 4,201; Gate: £ 320

October 23	Hull	12–22	Australia	The Boulevard, Hull
	Tries: 2 Wilson; G. Barlow; Goals: 3 Oliver (3)	[ Report]	Tries: 4 Jack Reardon (2); Percy Williams; Harry Pierce; Goals: 5 Jack Beaton (5)	Attendance: 15,000; Gate: £ 740; Referee: Phillips

October 27	Bradford Northern	6–19	Australia	Odsal Stadium, Bradford
	Tries: nil Goals: 3 Pollard (3)	[ Report]	Tries: 5 Wally Prigg (2); Herb Narvo; Fred Gilbert; Jack Reardon; Goals: 2 Ross McKinnon (2)	Attendance: 5,748; Gate: £ 500

October 30	Salford	11–8	Australia	The Willows, Salford
	Tries: 3 Feetham; Penalty Try; Edwards; Goals: 1 Risman	[ Report]	Tries: 2 Wally Prigg; Fred Gilbert; Goals: 1 Jack Beaton	Attendance: 12,000; Gate: £ 1,038

November 3	Wigan	23–25	Australia	Central Park, Wigan
	Tries: 5 Davies (3); Morley (2); Goals: 4 Sullivan (4)	[ Report]	Tries: 7 Andy Norval (2); Wally Prigg (2); Harry Pierce; Ernie Norman; Les Heidke; Goals: 2 Percy Williams; Jack Beaton	Attendance: 9,800; Gate: £ 694

November 6	Oldham	6–10	Australia	Watersheddings, Oldham
	Tries: nil Goals: 3 Ashworth (3)	[ Report]	Tries: 2 Ross McKinnon; Herb Narvo; Goals: 2 Jack Beaton; Percy Williams	Attendance: 15,000; Gate: £ 1,014

=== 2nd Test ===
November 13

England	13–3	Australia
Tries: 3 Alan Edwards (2); Barney Hudson; Goals: 2 Gus Risman (2)		Tries: 1 Len Dawson; Goals: nil

Station Road, Swinton
Attendance: 31,724
Gate: £ 3,815
Referee: Albert Harding (England)

November 17	Liverpool Stanley	9–28	Australia	Stanley Greyhound Stadium, Liverpool
	Tries: 1 Glover; Goals: 3 Nolan (3)	[ Report]	Tries: 6 Charlie Hazelton (2); Herb Narvo; Wally Prigg; Laurie Ward; Ernie Norman; Goals: 5 Jack Beaton (5)	Attendance: 1,500; Gate: £ 120

November 20	Huddersfield	17–7	Australia	Fartown Ground, Huddersfield
	Tries: 3 Pepperell; Shaw; Madden; Goals: 3 Fiddes (3); Field Goals: 1 Aspinall	[ Report]	Tries: 1 Wally Prigg; Goals: 2 Percy Williams (2)	Attendance: 9,383; Gate: £ 748

November 24	Swinton	5–3	Australia	Station Road, Swinton
	Tries: 1 Butters; Goals: 1 Hodgson	[ Report]	Tries: 1 Frank Curran; Goals: nil	Attendance: 4,113; Gate: £ 308

November 27	Warrington	8–6	Australia	Wilderspool Stadium, Warrington
	Tries: 2 Davies; Ceuto; Goals: 1 Shankland	[ Report]	Tries: 2 Ross McKinnon; Jack Reardon; Goals: nil	Attendance: 12,637; Gate: £ 1,021; Referee: Hughes

December 1	Leeds	21–8	Australia	Headingley, Leeds
	Tries: 5 Harris (2); Jenkins; Smith; Brogden; Goals: 3 Evans (3)	[ Report]	Tries: 2 Harry Robison; Herb Narvo; Goals: 1 Fred Gilbert	Attendance: 5,000

December 2	St Helens Combined XIII	7–15	Australia	Knowsley Road, St Helens
	Tries: 1 Bradbury; Goals: 2 Powell (2)	[ Report]	Tries: 3 Eric Lewis; Jack Beaton; Bert Williams; Goals: 3 Jack Beaton (2); Roy Thompson	Attendance: 2,000; Gate: £ 110

December 4	Barrow	12–8	Australia	Craven Park, Barrow
	Tries: 2 Thornburrow; Skelly; Goals: 3 French (3)	[ Report]	Tries: 2 Frank Curran (2); Goals: 1 Jack Beaton	Attendance: 8,153; Gate: £ 611

=== 3rd Test ===
December 18

England	3–13	Australia
Tries: 1 Barney Hudson; Goals: nil		Tries: 3 Andy Norval; Jack Reardon; Herb Narvo; Goals: 2 Jack Reardon (2)

Fartown Ground, Huddersfield
Attendance: 9,403
Gate: £ 1,237
Referee: Albert Harding (England)

December 25	Broughton Rangers	13–0	Australia	Belle Vue, Manchester
	Tries: 1 Smith; Goals: 5 Howells (4); Mills	[ Report]	Tries: nil Goals: nil	Attendance: 3,000; Gate: £ 200

== France leg ==
Four years previously, the Kangaroos had travelled to France to play an international against England, in Paris, on New Year's Eve, 1933. On this tour, Australia played rugby league matches against French teams for the first time. France had played their first international against England in April 1934. Matches involving France against England and Wales had followed in the 1934–35, 1935–36 and 1936–37 European Championships. The 1st Test against Australia was France's 8th Test Match.

=== 1st Test ===
January 1

France	6–35	Australia
Tries: 2 Andre Cussac; Henri Durand; Goals: nil		Tries: 9 Fred Gilbert (2); Len Dawson (2); Herb Narvo; Jack Beaton; Andy Norval; Wally Prigg; Jack Reardon; Goals: 4 Jack Beaton (4)

Stade Buffalo, Paris
Attendance: 11,500
Referee: Albert Dobson

January 2	RC Roanne XIII	13–20	Australia	Parc des Sports, Roanne
	Tries: Max Rousié; Goals:	[ Report]	Tries: 6 Jack Reardon (2); Wally Prigg; Charlie Hazelton; Ernie Norman; Edward Collins; Goals: 1 Percy Williams	Attendance: Gate: £ 930

January 9	South West France	11–12	Australia	Parc Lescure, Bordeaux
	Tries: 3 Puchulu; Sarez; Bot; Goals: 1	[ Report]	Tries: 2 Fred Gilbert; Len Dawson; Goals: 3 Jack Beaton (3)	Attendance: 10,000; Gate: £ 700; Referee: Albert Dobson

January 10	Racing Club Albi XIII	3–47	Australia	Stade Maurice Rigaud, Albi
	Tries: 1 Solenc; Goals: nil	[ Report]	Tries: 13; Herb Narvo (4); Edward Collins (3); Ross McKinnon (2); Jim Gibbs; Charlie Hazelton; Frank Griffiths; Bert Williams; Goals: 4 Percy Williams (3); Percy Fairall

January 15	XIII Catalan	2–53	Australia	Stade Jean-Laffon, Perpignan
	Tries: nil Goals: nil Field Goals: 1 Bosc	[ Report]	Tries: 11; Edward Collins (3); Wally Prigg (2); Jack Beaton; Ray Stehr; Gordon Whittle; Percy Williams; Charlie Hazelton; Ross McKinnon; Goals: 10; Jack Beaton (10)	Attendance: 8,000

=== 2nd Test ===
January 16

France	11–16	Australia
Tries: 3 Joseph Griffard; Henri Sanz; Andre Cussac; Goals: 1 Max Rousié		Tries: 4 Andy Norval; Ross McKinnon; Harry Pierce; Wally Prigg; Goals: 2 Jack Beaton (2)

Stade Vélodrome, Marseille
Attendance: 23,100
Gate: £ 1,260

January 22	Côte Basque XIII	8–33	Australia	Stade Jean-Dauger, Paris
	Tries: nil Goals: 4 Max Rousié (4)	[ Report]	Tries: 7 Len Dawson (2); Frank Griffiths; Jim Gibbs; Charlie Hazelton; Ray Stehr; Laurie Ward; Goals: 6 Percy Williams (6)	Referee: Peel

January 23	South France	15–0	Australia	Stadium de Toulouse, Toulouse
	Tries: 3 Bruneteau (2); Cougnes; Goals: 3 Guiral 3	[ Report]	Tries: nil Goals: nil	Attendance: 15,000; Referee: Peel

January 29	Villeneuve	3–26	Australia	Pont-de-Marot, Villeneuve-sur-Lot
	Tries: 1 Cargo; Goals: nil	[ Report]	Tries: 6 Harry Pierce (3); Ross McKinnon (2); Jack Reardon; Goals: 4 Ross McKinnon (4)	Attendance: 8,000; Referee: Peel

January 30	South East France	8–25	Australia	Stade de Gerland, Lyon
	Tries: Goals:	[ Report]	Tries: 7 Jack Reardon (2); Eric Lewis; Andy Norval; Jack Beaton; Percy Fairall; Ernie Norman; Goals: 2 Jack Beaton (2)
