= 1933–34 Kangaroo tour of Great Britain =

Rugby league tour (1933–1934)

- Tour captain(s): Frank McMillan
- Top point scorer(s): Dave Brown 285
- Top try scorer(s): Alan Ridley 17
- Top test point scorer(s): Dave Brown 15; Jim Sullivan 18
- Top test try scorer(s): 7 players with one try each ( 3 & 4)
Summary
P	W	D	L
Total
37	27	0	10
Test match
3	0	0	3
Opponent
P	W	D	L
England
3	0	0	3

Tour chronology
- Previous tour: 1929–30
- Next tour: 1937–38

The 1933–34 Kangaroo tour of Great Britain was the fifth Kangaroo tour, and took the Australia national rugby league team around the north of England, to London and Paris. The tour also featured the 11th Ashes series which comprised three Test matches and was the first to be won by Great Britain in a clean sweep. The squad's outbound journey was marred by tragedy when Sydney University centre Ray Morris contracted meningitis en route and died in hospital. The tour match played at Stade Pershing in Paris on New Year's Day 1934 was the first rugby league international played in France.

== Touring squad ==
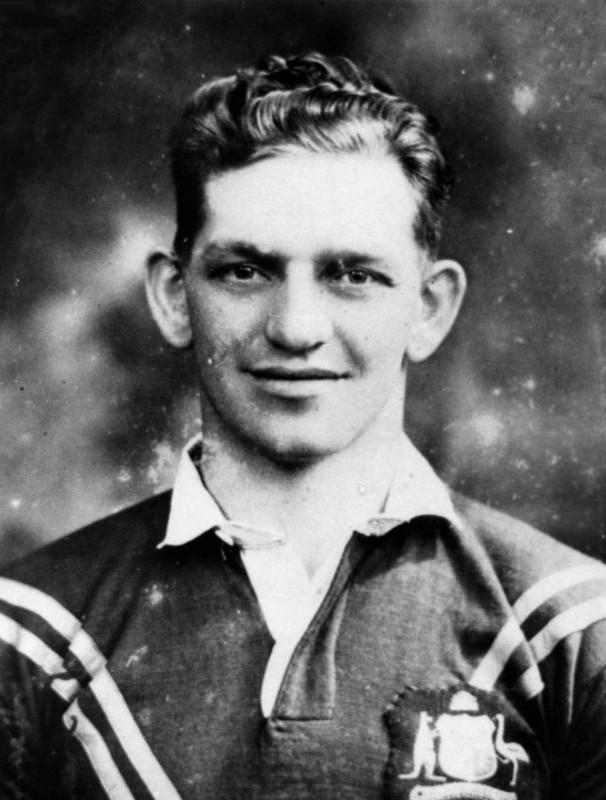
Mick Madsen, 2nd Test captain

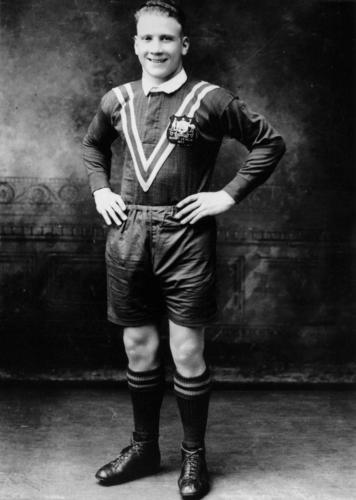
Vic Hey, three Tests at five-eighth

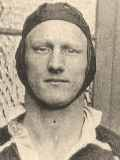
Dave Brown set an unsurpassed touring score record

Frank McMillan was named as captain-coach of the touring squad after his Queensland counterpart Herb Steinohrt declared himself unavailable to tour (it would not be until Wally Lewis led the 1986 Kangaroos that another Queensland player would captain a Kangaroo Tour of Great Britain and France). George Bishop and Ernie Norman were selected but ruled out of the tour before the squad left Sydney. Vic Hey and "Mick" Glasheen took their places.

Name	Posit.	Club	Tests
Dave Brown	centre	Eastern Suburbs	3
Alan Ridley	Winger	Queanbeyan	2
Wally Prigg	Lock	Centrals (Newcastle)	3
Sid Pearce	Second row	Eastern Suburbs	2
Fred Gardner	Winger	St George Dragons	1
Vic Hey	Five-eighth	Western Suburbs	3
Jim Gibbs	Second row	South Newcastle	2
Jack Why	Winger	South Sydney	2
Joe Doyle	Second row	Brothers (Toowoomba)	1
Frank O'Connor	Front row	South Sydney	2
Cliff Pearce	centre	Western Suburbs	3
Les Mead	Halfback	Western Suburbs	1
Fred Laws	Halfback	Newtown (Toowoomba)	1
Ray Stehr	Front row	Eastern Suburbs	2
Frank McMillan (c)	Fullback	Western Suburbs	2
Mick Madsen	Front row	Brothers (Toowoomba)	3
Bill 'Circy' Smith	Fullback	Starlights (Ipswich)	1
Viv Thicknesse	Halfback	Eastern Suburbs	2
Frank Doonar		Rialto (Ipswich)	0
Arthur Folwell	Hooker	Newtown	2
Fred Gilbert		Valleys (Toowoomba)	0
Dan Dempsey	Hooker	Booval	1
Melville Glasheen		Estates (Townsville)	0
Fred Neumann	Winger	Fortitude Valley	0
Frank Curran	Front row	South Sydney	0
Henry Denny	Forward	Western Suburbs (Brisbane)	0
Jack Little	Hooker	Fortitude Valley	0
Les Heidke	Second row	Tivoli	0
Ray Morris	centre	University	0

== The journey ==
Les Heidke was suffering from leg ulcers before the squad left Sydney and Dan Dempsey was brought in to take his place. The Queenslanders in the squad all contributed £10 to enable Heidke to make the tour as a private citizen and to perhaps recover in time to play. Heidke sailed with the squad from Sydney on the SS Manduna bound for Melbourne where they boarded the SS Jervis Bay for England. At sea Heidke's condition did not improve and he was put off the ship in Perth and headed home.

Exhibition matches were played in Colombo, Sri Lanka and in Egypt. Sydney University centre Ray Morris contracted an ear infection at sea. In the Mediterranean his condition worsened and he was put off the ship in Malta and hospitalised in Valletta. Two days later he died of meningitis.

=== Test venues ===
The three Ashes series tests took place at the following venues.

Manchester	Leeds	Swinton
Belle Vue	Headingley	Station Road
Capacity:	Capacity: 40,000	Capacity: 60,000

== 1st Test ==
7 October 1933

The Lions (United Kingdom)	4 – 0	Australia
Tries: Goals: Jim Sullivan (2)		Tries: Goals:

Belle Vue, Manchester
Attendance: 34,000
Referee: F Peel

The Lions	Posit.	Australia
Jim Sullivan (c)	FB	Frank McMillan (c)
Alf Ellaby	WG	Alan Ridley
Gus Risman	CE	Cliff Pearce
Stan Brogden	CE	Dave Brown
Stan Smith	WG	Jack Why
Billy Davies	SO	Vic Hey
Bryn Evans	SH	Viv Thicknesse
Nat Silcock	PR	Ray Stehr
Les White	HK	Dan Dempsey
Jack Miller	PR	Mick Madsen
Martin Hodgson	SR	Sid Pearce
Bill Horton	SR	Frank O'Connor
Jack Feetham	LF	Wally Prigg

The Australian team enjoyed an eleven match winning streak on the tour matches leading into the first Test. For the first sixty-five minutes of the match there was no score in the muddy conditions, then Lions fullback Jim Sullivan proved the difference with two penalty goals.

== 2nd Test ==
11 November 1933

The Lions (United Kingdom)	7 – 5	Australia
Tries: Jack Woods; Goals: Jim Sullivan (2)		Tries: Dave Brown; Goals: Dave Brown (1)

Headingley, Leeds
Attendance: 29,688
Referee: F Peel

The Lions	Posit.	Australia
Jim Sullivan (c)	FB	Bill Smith
Jack Woods	WG	Fred Gardner
Billy Dingsdale	CE	Cliff Pearce
Gus Risman	CE	Dave Brown
Barney Hudson	WG	Alan Ridley
Stan Brogden	SO	Vic Hey
Bryn Evans	SH	Viv Thicknesse
Nat Silcock	PR	Mick Madsen (c)
Les White	HK	Arthur Folwell
Jack Miller	PR	Frank O'Connor
Martin Hodgson	SR	Jim Gibbs
Bill Horton	SR	Joe Doyle
Jack Feetham	LF	Wally Prigg

== 3rd Test ==
16 December 1933

The Lions (United Kingdom)	19 – 16	Australia
Tries: Barney Hudson; Jack Feetham; Stan Smith; Goals: Jim Sullivan (5)		Tries: Vic Hey; Wally Prigg Goals: Dave Brown (5)

Station Road, Swinton
Attendance: 10,990
Referee: F Peel

The Lions	Posit.	Australia
Jim Sullivan (c)	FB	Frank McMillan (c)
Barney Hudson	WG	Cliff Pearce
Gus Risman	CE	Dave Brown
Arthur Atkinson	CE	Fred Laws
Stan Smith	WG	Jack Why
Emlyn Jenkins	SO	Vic Hey
Billy Watkins	SH	Les Mead
Nat Silcock	PR	Mick Madsen
Thomas Armitt	HK	Arthur Folwell
Jack Feetham	PR	Ray Stehr
Martin Hodgson	SR	Sid Pearce
Jack Miller	SR	Jim Gibbs
Bill Horton	LF	Wally Prigg

In winning the match which was played in thick fog, England became the first team to post a 3–0 clean sweep in an Anglo-Australian Test series.

== Matches of the tour ==
N°	Opposing Team	F	A	Date	Venue	Attendance	Status
1	St Helens Recs	13	9	26 Aug 1933	City Road, St. Helens	8,880	Tour match
2	Leigh	16	7	30 Aug 1933	Mather Lane, Leigh	4,590	Tour match
3	Hull Kingston Rovers	20	0	2 Sep 1933	Craven Park, Hull	7,831	Tour match
4	Bramley	53	6	6 Sep 1933	Barley Mow, Bramley	1,902	Tour match
5	Oldham	38	6	9 Sep 1933	Watersheddings, Oldham	15,281	Tour match
6	Yorkshire	13	0	13 Sep 1933	Headingley, Leeds	10,309	Tour match
7	Barrow	24	5	16 Sep 1933	Craven Park, Barrow	12,221	Tour match
8	Lancashire	33	7	20 Sep 1933	Wilderspool, Warrington	16,576	Tour match
9	Wigan	10	4	23 Sep 1933	Central Park, Wigan	15,712	Tour match
10	Castleford	39	6	27 Sep 1933	Wheldon Road, Castleford	4,250	Tour match
11	Halifax	16	5	30 Sep 1933	Thrum Hall, Halifax	10,358	Tour match
12	(United Kingdom) The Lions	0	4	7 Oct 1933	Belle Vue, Manchester	34,000	Test match
13	Bradford Northern	7	5	11 Oct 1933	Birch Lane, Bradford	3,328	Tour match
14	Warrington	15	2	14 Oct 1933	Wilderspool, Warrington	16,431	Tour match
15	Hunslet	22	18	18 Oct 1933	Parkside, Hunslet	6,227	Tour match
16	Salford	9	16	21 Oct 1933	The Willows, Salford	15,761	Tour match
17	Widnes	31	0	26 Oct 1933	Naughton Park, Widnes	6,691	Tour match
18	Wakefield Trinity	17	6	28 Oct 1933	Belle Vue, Wakefield	5,596	Tour match
19	Bradford Northern	10	7	30 Oct 1933	Birch Lane, Bradford	3,328	Tour match
20	English League	5	7	1 Nov 1933	Clarence Street, York	3,158	Tour match
21	Swinton	4	10	4 Nov 1933	Station Road, Swinton	13,341	Tour match
22	(United Kingdom) The Lions	5	7	11 Nov 1933	Headingley, Leeds	29,618	Test match
23	Keighley	14	7	14 Nov 1933	Lawkholme Lane, Keighley	3,800	Tour match
24	Huddersfield	13	5	18 Nov 1933	Fartown, Huddersfield	7,522	Tour match
25	London Highfield	20	5	22 Nov 1933	White City, London	10,541	Tour match
26	Broughton Rangers	19	0	25 Nov 1933	Belle Vue, Manchester	5,527	Tour match
27	Leeds	15	7	29 Nov 1933	Headingley, Leeds	5,295	Tour match
28	St. Helens	20	11	2 Dec 1933	Knowsley Road, St. Helens	5,735	Tour match
29	Rochdale Hornets	26	4	5 Dec 1933	Athletic Grounds, Rochdale	3,603	Tour match
30	(Cumbria) Cumberland	16	17	9 Dec 1933	Recreation Ground, Whitehaven	5,800	Tour match
31	(United Kingdom) The Lions	16	19	16 Dec 1933	Station Road, Swinton	10,900	Test match
32	York	15	7	23 Dec 1933	Clarence Street, York	6,500	Tour match
33	Hull F.C.	19	5	25 Dec 1933	The Boulevard, Hull	16,341	Tour match
34	Wales	51	19	30 Dec 1933	Wembley, London	10,000	International
35	England	63	13	31 Dec 1933	Stade Pershing, Paris	5,000	International
36	Oldham	38	5	10 Jan 1934	Watersheddings, Oldham	4,000	Tour match
37	England	14	19	13 Jan 1934	Redheugh Park, Gateshead	15,576	International

== Tour firsts ==
- The first Australian side to play a rugby exhibition match in Ceylon and Egypt.
- The first Australian side to play a match under lights.
- The first English side to win the Ashes in a clean sweep.
- The first rugby international to be played in France.
- Dave Brown's tour point-scoring record of 285 points (19 tries and 114 goals) remains unsurpassed.

== Published sources ==
- Whiticker, Alan & Hudson, Glen (2006) The Encyclopedia of Rugby League Players, Gavin Allen Publishing, Sydney
- Andrews, Malcolm (2006) The ABC of Rugby League Austn Broadcasting Corpn, Sydney
