= Joe Doyle (rugby league, born 1912) =

Australian rugby league footballer (1912 –1995)

Personal information
- Full name: Joe John Doyle
- Born: 14 April 1912 Pittsworth, Queensland, Australia
- Died: 13 November 1995 (aged 83)

Playing information
- Position: Second-row, Lock
Representative
Years	Team	Pld	T	G	FG	P
1932–35	Queensland	12	1	0	0	3
1933	Australia	2	1	0	0	3

Joe John Doyle (14 April 1912 – 13 November 1995) was an Australian rugby league footballer.

Born in Pittsworth, Queensland, Doyle was a bricklayer by profession who competed in rugby league as a forward during the 1930s. He was playing in Toowoomba when he earned a Kangaroos call up for their 1933–34 tour of Great Britain, where he gained two international caps, besides Jim Gibbs in the second row against Great Britain at Headingley, then as a front rower for their one-off match against Wales at Wembley. His career also included a stint as a player–coach for Murwillumbah in the Tweed competition.

Doyle, although considerably older, was a brother of the 1950s Australia lock Ian Doyle.
