= List of Brisbane Rugby League records =

This page details first-grade rugby league records from the Brisbane Rugby League and its predecessor the Queensland Rugby League, from 1909 until the competition was officially downgraded in 1995. First-grade games played between premiership teams are included, but not mid-week competitions or pre-season warm-up games.

== Team records ==
=== Premierships ===
Titles	Club	Seasons
24	Fortitude Valley	1909, 1911 (as Valley-Toombul), 1914, 1915, 1917, 1918, 1919, 1924, 1931, 1933, 1937, 1941, 1944, 1946, 1955, 1957, 1970, 1971, 1973, 1974, 1979, 1988 (as Seagulls-Diehards), 1989, 1990
13	Norths Devils	1927, 1934, 1938, 1940, 1959, 1960, 1961, 1962, 1963, 1964, 1966, 1969, 1980
12	Wests Panthers	1916, 1920, 1922, 1932, 1936, 1948, 1952, 1954, 1975, 1976, 1992, 1993
9	Past Brothers	1935, 1939, 1942, 1943, 1956, 1958, 1967, 1968, 1987
9	Souths Magpies	1921, 1925, 1930, 1945, 1949, 1951, 1953, 1981, 1985
8	Easts Tigers	1923, 1947, 1950, 1972, 1977, 1978, 1983, 1991
3	Wynnum-Manly Seagulls	1982, 1984, 1986
2	Redcliffe Dolphins	1965, 1994
2	University	1928, 1929
1	Past Brothers (Merthyr)	1926
1	West End	1913
1	Natives	1912
1	Ipswich	1910

Most consecutive

- 6 - Norths Devils (1959 to 1964)
- 3 - Fortitude Valley (1917 to 1919)

=== Minor premierships ===
Tally	Club	Seasons
26	Fortitude Valley	1911 (as Valley-Toombul), 1914, 1917, 1919, 1923, 1924, 1931, 1936, 1937, 1938, 1941, 1942, 1943, 1944, 1955, 1960, 1964, 1965, 1967, 1971, 1973, 1979, 1980, 1982, 1989, 1990
13	Wests Panthers	1916, 1920, 1922, 1932, 1933, 1934, 1948, 1950, 1952, 1958, 1972, 1975, 1993
11	Norths Devils	1935, 1939, 1940, 1945, 1959, 1961, 1962, 1963, 1966, 1969, 1974
10	Souths Magpies	1921, 1928, 1930, 1949, 1951, 1953, 1954, 1981, 1985, 1988
7	Easts Tigers	1925, 1927, 1946, 1947, 1976, 1991, 1992
5	Past Brothers	1956, 1957, 1968, 1970, 1987
4	Redcliffe Dolphins	1977, 1978, 1983, 1994
2	Wynnum-Manly Seagulls	1984, 1986
2	Past Brothers (Merthyr)	1918, 1926
1	University	1929
1	Woolloongabba	1915
1	West End	1913
1	Natives	1912
1	Ipswich	1910
1	South Brisbane	1909

==== Most consecutive ====
- 4 - Fortitude Valley (1941 to 1944)
- 3 - Norths Devils (1961 to 1963)
- 3 - Fortitude Valley (1936 to 1938)
- 3 - Wests Panthers (1932 to 1934)

=== Runners-up ===
Tally	Club	Seasons
16	Easts Tigers	1919, 1921, 1922, 1925, 1926, 1929, 1946, 1948, 1949, 1951, 1953, 1968, 1971, 1976, 1992, 1993
15	Fortitude Valley	1916, 1923, 1930, 1935, 1936, 1938, 1943, 1958, 1960, 1961, 1962, 1965, 1969, 1972, 1978
10	Past Brothers	1940, 1952, 1954, 1955, 1957, 1959, 1964, 1966, 1974, 1986
9	Wests Panthers	1915, 1927, 1933, 1934, 1937, 1950, 1956, 1991, 1994
9	Norths Devils	1931, 1932, 1939, 1941, 1944, 1945, 1967, 1970, 1990
8	Souths Magpies	1928, 1942, 1947, 1963, 1979, 1980, 1982, 1984
6	Redcliffe Dolphins	1973, 1975, 1977, 1981, 1983, 1987
4	Past Brothers (Merthyr)	1917, 1918, 1920, 1924
2	Ipswich Jets	1988, 1989
2	South Brisbane	1909, 1912
1	Wynnum-Manly Seagulls	1985
1	West End	1914
1	Natives	1913
1	Ipswich B	1911
1	Toombul	1910

==== Most consecutive ====
- 3 - Fortitude Valley (1960 to 1962)

=== Wooden spoons ===
Tally	Club	Seasons
14	Souths Magpies	1926, 1933, 1934, 1935, 1936, 1937, 1941, 1958, 1959, 1960, 1965, 1968, 1969, 1977
13	Wynnum-Manly Seagulls	1953, 1957, 1962, 1964, 1966, 1967, 1970, 1971, 1972, 1973, 1979, 1990, 1991
13	Wests Panthers	1918, 1923, 1929, 1942, 1943, 1946, 1947, 1974, 1980, 1982, 1983, 1985, 1986
11	Easts Tigers	1917, 1928, 1938, 1939, 1940, 1944, 1945, 1955, 1956, 1961, 1987
7	Norths Devils	1949, 1950, 1954, 1976, 1978, 1984, 1994
5	University	1921, 1924, 1925, 1927, 1930
3	Logan City Scorpions	1988, 1989, 1993
3	Past Brothers	1931, 1963, 1981
3	Fortitude Valley	1948, 1951, 1975
2	Railways	1913, 1920
2	West End	1915, 1919
1	Ipswich Jets	1992
1	South Coast	1952
1	Wynnum	1932
1	Past Brothers (Merthyr)	1922
1	Ipswich Starlights	1916
1	North Brisbane	1914
1	Woolloongabba	1912
1	South Brisbane United	1911
1	South Brisbane	1910
1	Toombul	1909

==== Most consecutive ====
- 5 - Souths Magpies (1933 to 1937)
- 4 - Wynnum-Manly Seagulls (1970 to 1973)
- 3 - Souths Magpies (1958 to 1960)
- 3 - Easts Tigers (1938 to 1940)

=== Team wins, losses, win percentage and draws ===
Teams in bold still existed at the end of the 1st-grade competition in 1994.

All-time ladder
Pos	Team	1st season	Last season	Pld	W	L	D	W%
1	Valley-Toombul	1911	1912	20	14	5	1	70.00%
2	Natives	1912	1913	22	15	7	0	68.18%
3	**Fortitude Valley**	1909	1994	1,382	831	506	45	60.13%
4	Ipswich B	1911	1911	10	6	3	1	60.00%
5	Toowong	1914	1914	11	6	5	0	54.55%
6	**Norths Devils**	1920	1994	1,266	681	548	37	53.79%
7	South Brisbane	1909	1914	58	31	27	0	53.45%
8	Seagulls-Diehards	1987	1988	36	19	16	1	52.78%
9	Ipswich A	1910	1911	19	10	8	1	52.63%
10	**Past Brothers**	1931	1994	1,126	569	519	38	50.53%
11	**Redcliffe Dolphins**	1960	1994	733	370	345	18	50.48%
12	**South Queensland Crushers**	1994	1994	22	11	10	1	50.00%
13	**Wests Panthers**	1915	1994	1,353	668	637	48	49.37%
14	**Easts Tigers**	1917	1994	1,322	636	640	46	48.11%
15	**Souths Magpies**	1919	1994	1,286	612	638	36	47.59%
16	Past Brothers (Merthyr)	1917	1929	182	86	84	12	47.25%
17	**Ipswich Jets**	1986	1994	171	80	82	9	46.78%
=18	Ipswich West End	1916	1916	10	4	5	1	40.00%
=18	Wynnum	1914	1914	10	4	6	0	40.00%
20	Toombul	1909	1910	18	7	10	1	38.89%
21	University	1920	1933	200	76	116	8	38.00%
22	Bulimba	1915	1920	19	7	9	3	36.84%
23	**Wynnum-Manly Seagulls**	1951	1994	852	303	530	19	35.56%
=24	West End	1913	1920	48	16	29	3	33.33%
=24	North Brisbane	1909	1914	33	11	22	0	33.33%
=24	East Brisbane	1910	1910	9	3	6	0	33.33%
=24	Kurilpa	1912	1912	9	3	6	0	33.33%
=24	West End-Grammars	1920	1920	6	2	3	1	33.33%
=29	Westerns	1917	1918	22	7	13	2	31.82%
=29	**Brisbane Broncos**	1994	1994	22	7	15	0	31.82%
31	Woolloongabba	1912	1916	28	8	14	6	28.57%
32	South Coast	1952	1952	35	8	27	0	22.86%
33	**Logan City Scorpions**	1988	1994	130	28	94	8	21.54%
34	Railways	1913	1920	39	8	30	1	20.51%
35	Wynnum District	1931	1932	28	4	23	1	14.29%
36	Ipswich Starlights	1916	1916	9	1	7	1	11.11%
37	Wattles	1916	1917	12	1	10	1	08.33%
=38	Bulimba-Railways	1920	1920	4	0	4	0	00.00%
=38	South Brisbane United	1911	1911	7	0	7	0	00.00%

=== Result records ===
==== Largest winning margin in a Grand Final ====
- 34 - Wynnum-Manly's 42–8 win over Southern Suburbs in 1984

== ARL-era records ==
=== Premierships ===
Season	Premiers	Score	Runners-up	Minor premiers	Wooden Spoon
1995	Wynnum-Manly Seagulls	32 – 24	Easts Tigers	Easts Tigers	Fortitude Valley
1996	Redcliffe Dolphins	16 – 12	Souths Magpies	N/A	N/A
1997	Redcliffe Dolphins	35 – 6	Easts Tigers	N/A	N/A

=== Team wins, losses, win percentage and draws ===
All-time ladder
Pos	Team	1st season	Last season	Pld	W	L	D	W%
1	Wynnum Seagulls	1995	1997	29	19	9	1	65.52%
2	Pine Rivers Brothers	1995	1997	26	17	9	3	65.38%
3	Easts Tigers	1995	1997	28	18	8	2	64.29%
4	Redcliffe Dolphins	1995	1997	24	15	9	1	62.50%
5	South Queensland Crushers	1995	1995	22	13	9	0	59.09%
6	Souths Magpies	1995	1997	29	17	12	0	58.62%
7	Brisbane Broncos	1995	1995	22	12	8	2	54.55%
=8	Ipswich Jets	1995	1996	23	8	13	2	34.78%
=8	Wests Panthers	1995	1997	23	8	15	0	34.78%
10	Logan City Scorpions	1995	1996	23	7	15	1	30.43%
11	Norths Devils	1995	1997	28	8	20	0	28.57%
12	Fortitude Valley	1995	1995	22	3	19	0	13.64%

== Pre-season records (incomplete) ==
=== Pre-season winners ===
Titles	Club	Seasons
4	Fortitude Valley	1979, 1980, 1981, 1982,
2	Wynnum-Manly Seagulls	1985, 1986
1	Past Brothers	1987
1	Souths Magpies	1984
1	Wests Panthers	1983
1	Easts Tigers	1978,
1	Norths Devils	1977,

== See also ==
- List of National Rugby League records
- List of Queensland Cup records
