= Frank Doonar =

Australian rugby league footballer (1909–1988)

Personal information
- Full name: Francis James Doonar
- Born: 25 May 1909
- Died: 6 October 1988 (aged 79)

Playing information
- Position: Five-eighth
Representative
Years	Team	Pld	T	G	FG	P
1930–39	Queensland	31	2	0	0	6
1933	Australia	1	0	0	0	0

Francis James Doonar (25 May 1909 – 6 October 1988) was an Australian rugby league footballer.

Doonar was educated at the Christian Brothers' School in his native Ipswich, Queensland.

A five–eighth, Doonar was known as a reliable player with a solid defensive game. He appeared regularly for Queensland, forming a halfback partnership with Fred Gilbert. His 23 interstate matches against New South Wales often came often opposite Vic Hey, his primary rival for a national team place. He got his opportunity to represent Australia on their 1933–34 tour of Great Britain and played his sole international match against England during a stopover in Paris. At club level, Doonar captained Ipswich clubs Brothers and Rialto.
