= Glasheen (surname) =

Glasheen is a surname. Notable people with the surname include:

- Adaline Glasheen (1920–1993), American writer and Joyce scholar
- David Glasheen (died 2025), Australian mining tycoon and hermit
- Melville Glasheen (1904–1971), Australian rugby league player
- William Glasheen (1876–1941), Australian politician

== See also ==
- Glasheen, a suburb in south central Cork city, Ireland.
