= Henry Denny (disambiguation) =

Henry Denny (1803–1871) was an English museum curator and entomologist.

Henry Denny may refer also to:

- Henry Denny (rugby league), Australian rugby league player
- Sir Henry Denny, 7th Baronet (1878–1953), of the Denny baronets
- Henry Denny (MP), MP for St Germans

== See also ==
- Henry Denny Denson (1715–1780), Irish-born soldier and political figure in Nova Scotia
