= Noel Morgan =

Noel Morgan may refer to:

- Noel Morgan (cricketer) (1905–1975), Welsh cricketer
- Noel Morgan (rugby league) (born 1940), Australian rugby league footballer
