= Harry Forbes =

Harry Forbes may refer to:

- Harry Forbes (boxer) (1879–1946), American boxer
- Harry Forbes (cinematographer) (1888–1939), American cinematographer
- Harry Forbes (rugby league) (1914–1995), Australian rugby league football player
