= Dan Dempsey =

Australia international rugby league footballer

Personal information
- Born: 15 January 1901
- Died: 9 January 1960 (aged 58)

Playing information
- Position: Hooker
Club
Years	Team	Pld	T	G	FG	P
1922	Brothers (Warwick)
1923–25	Valleys Toowoomba
1926–30	Booval Swifts
1931–34	Tivoli
	Total	0	0	0	0	0
Representative
Years	Team	Pld	T	G	FG	P
1924–25	Toowoomba	8	0	0	0	0
1925–34	Queensland	32	7	0	0	21
1926–34	Ipswich	37	5	0	0	15
1928–34	Australia	7	0	0	0	0

Dan Dempsey (15 January 1901 – 9 January 1960) was an Australian rugby league national and Queensland state representative player. He played as a hooker and is considered one of the nation's finest footballers of the 20th century.

== Biography ==
=== Club career ===
He played at Toowoomba club in 1924–25. Alongside Herb Steinohrt, Tom Gorman and Duncan Thompson Dempsey was in the Toowoomba sides which beat all comers including Sydney premiers Souths, Brisbane, Ipswich and visiting representative sides including New South Wales, Victoria, Great Britain and New Zealand.

In the 1930s he played in the Ipswich Rugby League for the Tivoli club, and was a major influence in the years 1933-1935 when Ipswich dominated the Bulimba Cup, the triangular series played between the city representative sides from Brisbane, Toowoomba and Ipswich.

=== Representative career ===
Dempsey played in all three Tests of the 1928 domestic Ashes series and in the first two Tests of the 1932 domestic series. In the famous "Battle of Brisbane" Test of 1932, Dempsey was forced off the field with a broken arm early in the second half. Dempsey, his arm placed in splints, began weeping on the touchline because both the ambulanceman and the team's manager, Harry Sunderland wouldn't let him back into the game. He is listed on the Australian Players Register as Kangaroo No.135.

He made two Kangaroo tours: 1929–30 where he played in one Test and nine tour matches and 1933–34 playing one Test and eleven minor games. All up Dempsey played in four Ashes series against Great Britain.

== Accolades ==
In February 2008, Dempsey was named in the list of Australia's 100 Greatest Players (1908–2007) which was commissioned by the NRL and ARL to celebrate the code's centenary year in Australia.

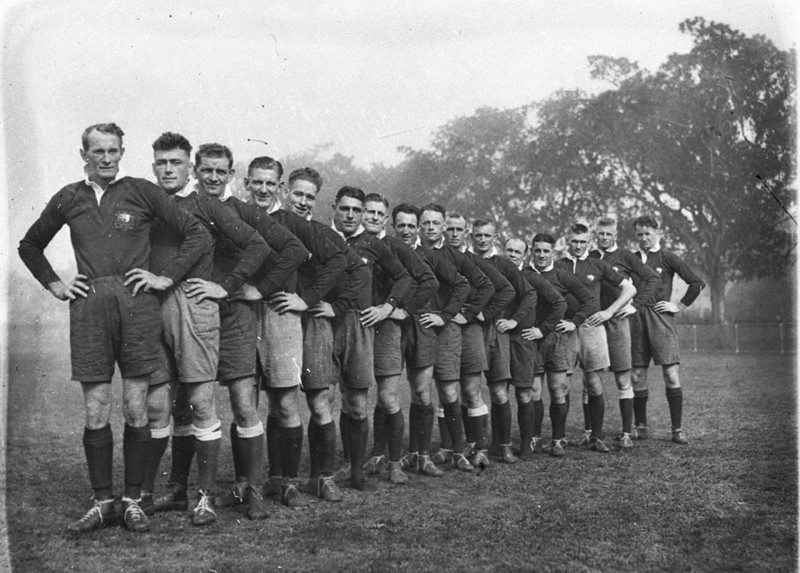
Dempsey 2nd from left, Kangaroos 1st Test 6 Jun 1932

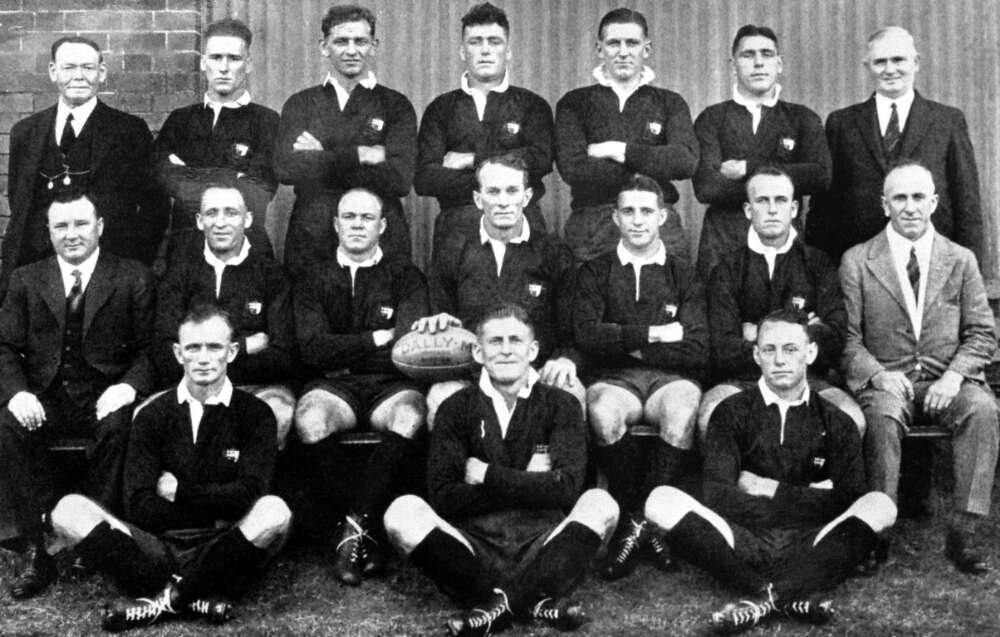
Run-on Test side 6 Jun 1932, Dempsey centre of back row

In 2008, rugby league in Australia's centenary year, Dempsey was named at hooker in the Toowoomba and South West Team of the Century.

== Sources ==
- Whiticker, Alan & Hudson, Glen (2006) The Encyclopedia of Rugby League Players, Gavin Allen Publishing, Sydney
- Andrews, Malcolm (2006) The ABC of Rugby League Austn Broadcasting Corpn, Sydney
- Fagan, Sean (2000–2006) RL1908.com
- Queensland Representatives at qrl.com.au
