= Harry Robison =

Australian rugby league player

Personal information
- Full name: Harold Leslie Robison
- Born: 11 November 1912
- Died: 31 October 2008 (aged 95)

Playing information
- Position: Wing
Representative
Years	Team	Pld	T	G	FG	P
1934–39	Queensland	14	9	1	0	29
1937	Australia	1	0	0	0	0

Harold Leslie Robison (11 November 1912 – 31 October 2008) was an Australian rugby league player.

== Rugby league career ==
A winger from Dalby, Robison made his Queensland interstate debut in 1934 and the following year gained a call up to the Australia squad for a tour of New Zealand, but injured his leg prior to departure and had to withdraw.

Robison was recalled for the 1937–38 Kangaroo tour, this time benefiting from injury as a replacement player, with Fred Tottey having failed a medical examination. He made his national debut against NZ Māori during a stopover in New Zealand, before they headed to Europe. His appearances in Great Britain and France were limited to the minor matches. He scored a try in Australia's narrow win over Yorkshire.
