= Len Dawson (rugby league) =

Australian rugby league footballer

Personal information
- Full name: Leslie Dawson
- Born: 29 March 1915
- Died: 22 December 1969 (aged 54)

Playing information
- Position: Wing
Club
Years	Team	Pld	T	G	FG	P
1944	Newtown Jets	6	3	0	0	9
Representative
Years	Team	Pld	T	G	FG	P
1937–38	Australia	5	3	0	0	9
1938	New South Wales	3	5	0	0	15
1939–40	Queensland	9	7	0	0	21

Leslie Dawson (29 March 1915 – 22 December 1969) was an Australian rugby league footballer.

== Biography ==
A specialist winger, Dawson was a product of Newcastle rugby league and while attached to local club Eastern Suburbs won international selection for Australia's 1937–38 overseas tour.

Dawson debuted for Australia in the second of two matches played on a stop over in New Zealand. Once in England, Dawson had an early impact with four tries against Newcastle. He played twice against England and gained a further two caps against France. His appearances in France included a two try performance in the series opener.

On his return to Australia, Dawson relocated to Brisbane and joined Past Brothers. He was back in Newcastle in 1940 and turned down offers from several Sydney clubs before signing to play in the Ipswich league.

Dawson spent a season with the Newtown Jets in 1944.
