= Fred Nolan (rugby league) =

Australian rugby league footballer

Personal information
- Full name: Frederick Nolan
- Born: 5 December 1913 Sydney, NSW, Australia
- Died: 25 August 1978 (aged 64)

Playing information
- Position: Hooker
Club
Years	Team	Pld	T	G	FG	P
1933–37	North Sydney Bears	56	4	0	0	12
Representative
Years	Team	Pld	T	G	FG	P
1937	New South Wales	3	0	0	0	0
1937	Australia	2	1	0	0	3

Frederick Nolan (5 December 1913 – 25 August 1978) was an Australian rugby league footballer.

A Sydney–born hooker, Nolan was of a stocky build and came to North Sydney's first grade team from the juniors. He had a quick rise in representative football. After first turning out for Sydney seconds in 1937, Nolan went on to gain both state and international selection during same season.

Nolan was a member of the Kangaroos squad for their 1937–38 tour of Great Britain. He featured in two Test matches against New Zealand at Carlaw Park on a stop over, then was largely a reserve for the British leg of the tour, with Harry Pierce preferred for the internationals. On his return home, Nolan announced his retirement from rugby league, citing a desire to concentrate on his military career.
