= Henry Denny (rugby league) =

Australian rugby league footballer (1898–1987)

Personal information
- Full name: Henry Thomas Denny
- Born: 29 September 1898 Kaitaia, New Zealand
- Died: 4 January 1987 (aged 88)

Playing information
- Position: Front row
Representative
Years	Team	Pld	T	G	FG	P
1933	Queensland	2	0	0	0	0
1933	Australia

Henry Thomas Denny (29 September 1898 – 4 January 1987) was an Australian rugby league footballer.

Denny was born in Kaitaia, New Zealand, and served with the AIF during World War I.

A forward, Denny played for Ipswich Tivoli and Brisbane club Western Suburbs. His representative opportunities didn't come until he was in his 30s. He represented Brisbane in the Bulimba Cup, was capped twice for Queensland, and appeared for Australia in seven non–international fixtures on their 1933–34 tour of Great Britain.
