= Birch Lane =

Rugby League ground in Bradford, UK

Coordinates: 53°46′36.7″N 1°45′04.7″W

- Interactive map of Birch Lane
- Location: Bradford
- Record attendance: 10,807 for Bradford Northern v Dewsbury, 16 February 1924

Construction
- Opened: Before 1886
- Renovated: 1929
- Expanded: 1908, 1913
- Closed: After 1934

Tenants
- Bradford Northern; Bradford F.C.

Birch Lane was a rugby league ground in Bradford, England. It was the first long term home of Bradford Northern Rugby League Football Club, who played there for 26 years from 1908 to 1934 before moving to Odsal Stadium. For a short while it was also home to Bradford F.C. in their first incarnation as a football club. Birch Lane was described as "notorious" and a "poverty-stricken place" and was never popular either with Northern or, for the short period they were there, Bradford F.C.

There is also a cricket ground at Birch Lane which adjoins the site of the rugby ground, home to Bowling Old Lane Cricket Club. This predates the rugby ground and continues in existence to this day.

== History ==
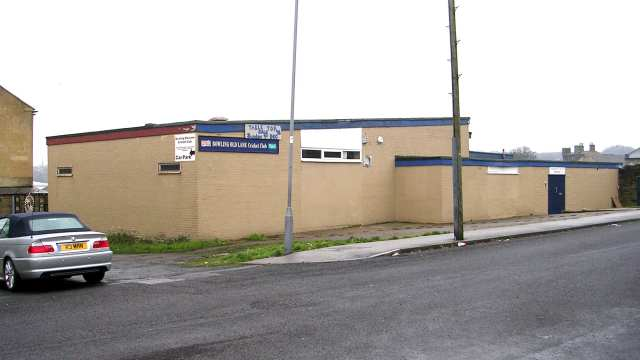
Bowling Old Lane Cricket Club

The four acre field at Birch Lane which was to become the rugby and football ground was originally leased by the Bowling Old Lane Cricket Club. The plot, which adjoined the cricket ground, was taken on at the start of the 1886/87 season as a home for their counterpart rugby club.

Bradford F.C., the city's senior association football team at the time, spent a season at Birch Lane in 1898/99, when it was banished from its home at Park Avenue. At that time, the ground was generally referred to as Bowling Old Lane. The arrangement did not last. Birch Lane had poor transport connections and no shelter for supporters. Bradford played their last game at Birch Lane on 8 April 1899 when they beat Hunslet 2–1. In 1906, the Bowling Old Lane rugby club switched over to soccer.

Bradford Northern first approached the club to rent the ground shortly after their formation in 1907. However, the offer of £50 rent was refused at an AGM on 31 May of that year and the club based itself at Greenfield Athletic Ground instead. The following year, the Bowling Old Lane club relented and offered the field to Northern at a rent of £30. Despite having spent £302 on ground improvements at Greenfield, Northern accepted and approved the move at their AGM of June 1908.

That summer, an open stand of twelve terraces was built, with a press hut at its centre. Huddersfield were Northern's first visitors on 12 September 1908, when they won 14–11. In August 1913, the capacity of the ground was expanded by 2,000 by moving a boundary fence. Despite this, by 1921 Northern were already finding Birch Lane limiting and were looking for a new home.

Birch Lane's biggest day was 16 February 1924 when 10,807 saw the first round Challenge Cup match with Dewsbury. The ground was unable to handle crowds of this size though and the wooden fencing around the pitch gave way. Later that year, a new embankment at the Cross Street end increased the capacity to 15,000, but Northern still chose to play major games at Valley Parade, home of Bradford City AFC. This included a match against the touring Australians.

The open stand was finally covered in January 1929, by which time Northern had agreed to move back to Greenfield, only for the move to fall through due to Northern's precarious finances. A move eventually came in June 1933, when Northern signed a lease with Bradford Council for the site that was to become Odsal Stadium, the biggest ground in England outside Wembley, still the club's home to this day. This move has been credited with keeping Bradford Northern in business. During their stay at the ground, Northern had only been kept going through 'mile of penny' schemes, bazaars and subscriptions. Birch Lane at that time, with "its little stand, its surround of rusty galvanised iron pipe, its insecure unvertical posts and its similarity to a hen-run" did little to enhance the club's status. Northern lost their last game at the ground 7–8 to St. Helens Recs on 7 April 1934, Tom Winnard scoring the last points at the ground. Bradford Northern Rugby League Football Club had played at Birch Lane for 26 years from 1908 to 1934.

Birch Lane continued to be used for amateur rugby league for a number of years until eventually it was sold for development. Today, while the adjacent cricket ground remains, the former rugby ground is covered by housing and part of Ryan Street School. A stanchion from the stand could still be found in a neighbouring back garden as late as 1992.

== Rugby League Tour Matches ==
Other than Bradford Northern club games, Birch Lane also saw Bradford play host to international touring teams from Australia (sometimes playing as Australasia), New Zealand from 1921 to 1933.

| game | Date | Result | Attendance | Notes |
|---|---|---|---|---|
| 1 | 28 September 1921 | Australasia def. Bradford Northern 53–3 | 3,000 | 1921–22 Kangaroo tour |
| 2 | 19 October 1926 | New Zealand def. Bradford Northern 38–17 | 4,000 | 1926–27 New Zealand Kiwis tour |
| 3 | 13 November 1929 | Australia def. Bradford Northern 26–17 | 7,000 | 1929–30 Kangaroo tour |
| 4 | 11 October 1933 | Bradford Northern def. Australia 7–5 | 3,328 | 1933–34 Kangaroo tour |
| 5 | 30 October 1933 | Australia def. Bradford Northern 10–7 | 9,937 | 1933–34 Kangaroo tour |

== Bibliography ==
- Delaney, Trevor (1991). The Grounds Of Rugby League. Keighley: Trevor R. Delaney. ISBN 0-9509-9822-2.
- Ludlam, Cedric H. (1969). The Complete History of Bradford Northern Rugby League Football Club. Bradford: Alf Smith & Co.
