= Norm McGregor =

Australian professional rugby footballer

Playing information
- Position: Wing, Centre, Second-row
Club
Years	Team	Pld	T	G	FG	P
1909–10	Fortitude Valley	8	11	0	0	37
Representative
Years	Team	Pld	T	G	FG	P
1909	Queensland	1	0	0	0	0
1913	Queensland	1	1	0	0	3

Norm McGregor was an Australian professional rugby league footballer who played two seasons with the Fortitude Valley Diehards of the Queensland Rugby League competition. He also represented the Queensland Firsts at representative level.

== Playing career ==
McGregor made his debut in Round 1, 1909 - the inaugural round of the QRL competition and the first ever club game of Valleys. Starting on the wing, his team lost 2-12 to the South Brisbane Magpies. The following round, McGregor scored twice against the Norths Devils (his first career tries), however his team lost 6-9. He scored another two tries in a lopsided 18-0 win against Toombul - the club's first ever win. His try-scoring streak continued with a try against Souths in Round 4, playing at centre. In Round 5, McGregor started at second row as his side defeated Norths, clinching a third straight win. In the 6th and final round of the season, McGregor scored his 6th try of the season in a 16-0 triumph over Toombul. In the semi-finals, Valleys continued their hot streak scoring 30 unanswered points in a rematch against the lowly Toombul. McGregor had the best game of that season with 2 tries and 2 goals. Valleys now on 5 straight wins (no losses since Round 2), were tasked with facing Souths in the grand final. McGregor scored, helping his team win the inaugural grand final 22-4. Valleys also claimed the minor premiership. McGregor scored 31 points, including 9 tries and was the highest try-scorer and point-scorer for that season.

In 1910, McGregor played in the opening round. Valleys kept East Brisbane to zero tries, winning 21-2. The next round, McGregor scored two tries in a 17-8 win over Souths. Valleys finished 4th for the season, but did not qualify for the finals as they were not a top 3 team.

McGregor did not play another club game for his career after the 1910 season, however he did make an appearance for the Queensland Firsts in 1913.

He finished his career with an impressive 11 tries from 8 appearances (although there was no data for the rest of Valleys' 1910 season, so this number may be inaccurate).

== Representative career ==
McGregor's performances that season earned him selection into Queensland Firsts. He made his representative career debut against New Zealand - who were touring Australia that year. QLD Firsts lost 40-25. It wasn't until 1913 that McGregor made another representative appearance. The game against New Zealand also happened to be his last representative game. He scored the only try for his team, as Firsts lost 39-5.
