= Fred Gardner (rugby league) =

Australia international rugby league footballer

- Fred Gardner. 1930

Personal information
- Full name: Frederick Harry Brook Littlefield Gardner
- Born: 16 September 1909 Kogarah, New South Wales, Australia
- Died: 3 September 1999 (aged 89) South Hurstville, New South Wales, Australia

Playing information
- Position: Three-quarter back
Club
Years	Team	Pld	T	G	FG	P
1929–35	St. George	82	38	8	0	130
Representative
Years	Team	Pld	T	G	FG	P
1933–34	City NSW	2	2	0	0	6
1933–34	New South Wales	4	3	0	0	9
1933	Australia	1	1	0	0	3

Fred Gardner (1909–1999), also known by the nickname of "Yappy", was an Australian professional rugby league footballer who played in the 1930s.

== Career ==
A New South Wales interstate and Australian international representative three-quarter back, he played in the NSWRFL Premiership for the St. George club. His son, Fred Gardner Jr., was a star player in the Illawarra Rugby League and also had a brief career with St George.

A St. George junior from Hurstville Public School and the Hurstville United club, Gardner commenced his first grade NSWRFL Premiership career in the 1929 season.

Having already represented New South Wales in 1933, 'Yappy' Gardner was selected to tour with the 1933-34 Kangaroos, making his test debut and becoming Kangaroo No. 188. It was against England in the Second Test at Headingley and was Gardner's sole Test appearance. He scored 13 tries in 20 matches on that tour.

Gardner scored eleven tries during the 1934 NSWRFL season, sharing the League's top try-scorer position with Dave Brown and Vic Hey. The following season he played in the record-breaking 91–6 win over NSWRFL newcomers Canterbury-Bankstown. The 1935 NSWRFL season was Gardner's last in first grade.
