= Noel Morgan (rugby league) =

Australian rugby league player

Personal information
- Born: 1940; Brisbane, Queensland, Australia
- Died: February 1990 (aged 49–50); Bundaberg, Queensland, Australia

Playing information
- Position: Fullback
Club
| Years | Team | Pld | T | G | FG | P |
|---|---|---|---|---|---|---|
| 1959–62 | Easts Tigers |
| 1963–64 | West End Athletic |
| | Total | 0 | 0 | 0 | 0 | 0 |
Representative
| Years | Team | Pld | T | G | FG | P |
| 1963–64 | Townsville |
| 1965–67 | Cairns |

Noel Morgan (born 1940 in Brisbane, Queensland) is an Australian former professional rugby league footballer. He first played for the Easts (Brisbane) in Queensland as a junior and then as a senior player in the Brisbane Rugby League, debuting at the age of 19 in 1959 at the end of the season, representing Brisbane on a number of occasions against a touring International side and in the Bulimba Cup against the Toowoomba and Ipswich representative sides. At age 22 at the end of the 1962 BRL season, he was signed by West End Athletic in the Townsville Rugby League Competition for several seasons and later with a Cairns Rugby League club, representing both Townsville and Cairns in the famous Foley Shield, which led to making the North Queensland representative side on a number of occasion playing the Brisbane rep team and playing against touring International sides. He played against England, France and New Zealand touring test sides. His position of choice was usually always at the back at fullback.

== Easts Tigers ==
Morgan was a fullback with Brisbane club, Easts Tigers from 1959 to 1962. He was named in the former Brisbane Rugby League rugby league club and now Queensland Cup club's official "75 Year Dream Team" on 24 June 2008.

The club's only success in the 1960s was due to a match winning try from Noel Morgan, "The only real success the A grade team enjoyed in the early sixties was the winning of the Peter Scott Memorial Trophy in 1960 played between the two leading teams at the end of the second competition round."

The following report is from the BRL program of 27 and 28 July 1960 in the Famous Flashbacks section. It details the game played between the two leading teams at the end of the second round of the competition. The competition in those days was three round and eight teams and they were still playing unlimited tackle and the three yards rule in defence.

"A dramatic finish can turn an ordinary football match into something to remember but when a match is brilliant throughout with the drama of a last minute try for victory, it becomes a match of a lifetime. And the 1960 Peter Scott Memorial final between Easts and Valleys at Lang Park was such an encounter. It was a match which was wide open until the final hooter sounded and Easts had won 13 – 10. Easts snatched the 1960 Peter Scott Memorial final with only seconds of play remaining when Easts Bulimba Cup fullback, Noel Morgan, flashed over for a try. This gave Easts an 11 – 10 lead but Easts halfback, Stan Neave, made sure of the victory when he converted the try for a final score of 13 – 10. The match was the best of the year and the brand of football played through by both teams made a draw seem like a fair result according to reports."

== Townsville ==
He played with West End Athletic rugby league football club for 2 seasons from 1963.

Exert from the club's website: "Late in the 50s, early 60s we won the Club Championship several times, as well as premierships in the lower grades. Outstanding players of that era were; Pat Payers, Pat Eales, George Church, Bevan Hoyle, Col McElligott, Mal Lindsay, Dave Parkin, John and Graham Weir, Les Wilson, Bill Cumner, Bob Mitting, Lyle Humphries, Mick Hill, George Madsen and Noel Morgan."

== Foley Shield ==
Noel Morgan represented both Townsville and Cairns within a 5-year period from 1963 to 1968, while winning the shield on a number of occasions.
