= Lionel Morgan (rugby league) =

Australian rugby league footballer (1938–2023)

Lionel Morgan AM
Personal information
- Born: 12 August 1938 Tweed Heads, New South Wales, Australia
- Died: 16 September 2023 (aged 85)

Playing information
- Position: Wing
Club
Years	Team	Pld	T	G	FG	P
1959–68	Wynnum-Manly	106
Representative
Years	Team	Pld	T	G	FG	P
	Brisbane		23			147
1960–63	Queensland	16	15	28	0	101
1960	Australia	3	2	0	0	6

Lionel Morgan (12 August 1938 – 16 September 2023) was an Australian rugby league footballer—named amongst the nation's finest of the 20th century—and coach. Morgan was the first Indigenous Australian to be selected to play in a recognised rugby league Test match. He primarily played on the wing.

== Rugby League career ==
A New South Wales' Schoolboy representative player, Morgan moved from Tweed Heads to play for Wynnum-Manly in the Brisbane Rugby League premiership. In 1960 he was selected for the second and third Tests of the French tour of Australia. He scored two tries on his international debut. At the end of the 1960 season, he played one match for Australia in the 1960 World Cup, again against France, at Wigan. Morgan's selection for the Tests made him the first Indigenous Australian to represent at an international level in any major national sporting team. In 1962 he was named Queensland's Best Back.

A representative of Brisbane in the Bulimba Cup, Morgan scored 24 tries and 147 points in just 18 games between 1959 and 1963. In 1962, he scored 5 tries and 6 goals in a single match against Ipswich.

Morgan was subjected to racism throughout his career. He has described an incident in a match against Ipswich. "I was tackled over the sideline, and apparently the whole Ipswich team jumped on top of me," he said. "I woke up in hospital." In another incident he was hospitalised after being punched by a spectator.

Morgan continued his association with rugby league as coach of the Queensland Rugby League's Indigenous Under-16 team.

== Personal life ==
Morgan was born on 12 August 1938, in Tweed Heads, New South Wales.

His four sons all spent time playing for Wynnum-Manly.

Morgan died on 16 September 2023, at age 85.

== Honour ==
In August 2008, Morgan was named on the wing in the Indigenous Team of the Century.

=== Hall of Fame ===
In August 2024, the National Rugby League announced that Morgan was a posthumous inductee into the National Rugby League Hall of Fame. Morgan, who was ascribed Hall of Fame number 116, was amongst eleven male players in the 2024 Class.

== General sources ==
- Alan Whiticker & Glen Hudson (1995). The Encyclopedia of Rugby League Players (with Queensland Section). Smithfield, New South Wales: Gary Allen Pty Ltd. p. 516. ISBN 978-1-877082-93-1.
- Queensland representatives at qrl.com.au
