= Charlie Hazelton =

Australia international rugby league footballer

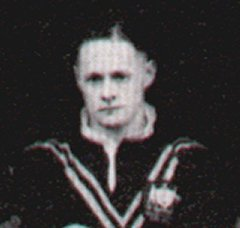

Personal information
- Born: 18 September 1917; Port Kembla, New South Wales, Australia
- Died: 19 October 1985 (aged 68); Wollongong, New South Wales, Australia

Playing information
- Position: Wing
Club
Years	Team	Pld	T	G	FG	P
1939–40	St. George	26	27	0	0	81
1937–46	Port Kembla
	Total	26	27	0	0	81
Representative
Years	Team	Pld	T	G	FG	P
1937	New South Wales	2	2	0	0	6
1937–38	Australia	1	2	0	0	6
1937–46	NSW Country	2	0	0	0	0
1939	NSW City	1	0	0	0	0
- Source: Whiticker/Hudson

Charlie Hazelton (1917–1985) was an Australian rugby league footballer who played in the 1930s and 1940s. A state and national representative winger from Port Kembla, New South Wales, Hazelton came to Sydney in 1939 to join the St. George club in the New South Wales Rugby League premiership competition.

A country player from Port Kembla, Hazelton came to attention representing Country in their 1937 win over City. He was selected on the wing in two matches of the 1937 interstate series for New South Wales against Queensland and scored two tries on debut. He was then selected for the 1937-38 Kangaroo tour of New Zealand, Great Britain and France and played in a Test match against New Zealand. He figured in fifteen other tour matches of that tour.

== Club career & war service ==
Hazelton was signed to St George and came to Sydney in 1939. He scored seventeen tries in his top grade debut season of 1939 before WWII interrupted his career. He signed up early in the conflict enlisting in June 1940 as a Lance-Bombardier in the 2/5 Field Regiment of the Royal Australian Artillery. He was not discharged until the war's end. He returned to play for Port Kembla after the war and made another appearance for Country NSW in 1946.

Hazelton's death in 1985 occurred on the way home from watching a St George Dragons v Illawarra Steelers match.
