= Jack Reardon (rugby league) =

Australia international rugby league footballer and sports journalist

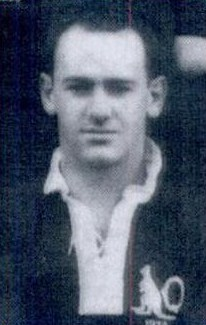

Personal information
- Born: 25 November 1914 Nambour, Queensland, Australia
- Died: 22 July 1991 (aged 76) Brisbane, Queensland, Australia

Playing information
- Position: Centre
Club
Years	Team	Pld	T	G	FG	P
1932–3?	Marist Bros. (Lismore)
1936–4?	Norths (Brisbane)
19??–??	Brothers (Brisbane)
	Total	0	0	0	0	0
Representative
Years	Team	Pld	T	G	FG	P
1934	New South Wales	1	0	0	0	0
1936–41	Queensland	21	4	0	0	12
1937–38	Australia	4	2	0	0	6

Jack Reardon (25 November 1914 – 22 July 1991) was an Australian rugby league footballer who played in the 1930s and 1940s and who later became a sports journalist. An Australian international and both a New South Wales and Queensland representative centre, he played club football in country New South Wales before moving to Queensland and playing in the Brisbane Rugby League premiership. He is also well known for his football journalism and being the first to suggest 'state of origin' selection rules for interstate rugby league.

== Playing career ==
Born in Nambour, Queensland, Reardon came from Ballina, New South Wales to play for the Marist Brothers club in Lismore. He achieved selection for the New South Wales rugby league team before being lured north in 1936 to play in the Brisbane Rugby League premiership for the Norths club. In his first year in Brisbane he was selected to represent Queensland, and the following year he was named vice-captain for the 1937–38 Kangaroo tour. He is listed on the Australian Players Register as Kangaroo No. 212. He played in 4 Tests. Reardon captained his club, Norths, to a premiership in 1938 and in 1939 was named captain of Queensland. He won another premiership with Norths in 1940.

== Post-playing career ==
Reardon later became a football journalist for Brisbane's Courier Mail. He suggested the adoption of 'state of origin' selection rules as far back as 1964 but was met with derision from New South Wales. He died in 1991.

For his thirty years' service as the Courier Mail's senior rugby league writer, in 2006 he was inducted into Suncorp Stadium's Sports Media Hall of Fame. On 16 August 2008, the year of the Centenary of Rugby League, Norths Devils announced their greatest team ever, naming Reardon at centre.
