= Bert Williams (rugby league) =

Australia international rugby league footballer

Personal information
- Born: 31 July 1914 Forbes, NSW, Australia
- Died: 14 March 1998 (aged 83)

Playing information
- Position: Centre / Wing
Representative
Years	Team	Pld	T	G	FG	P
1937	New South Wales	1	1	0	0	3
1937–38	Australia	3	0	0	0	0

Bert Williams (31 July 1914 – 14 March 1998) was an Australian rugby league footballer.

== Biography ==
A three–quarter, Williams was a strongly built player at 14 stone and made his name in Group 9 Rugby League as a centre for West Wyalong. He captained New South Wales Country and was capped once for New South Wales. Through his job as a relief worker for Shell Oil, Williams was required to move around the state and from 1936 turned out for several other clubs, including Condobolin, Forbes, Goulburn and Mudgee.

Williams won a place on the Kangaroos squad for their 1937–38 tour and departed with the team on his 23rd birthday. He featured on the wing in two of the three Test matches against England and gained a third cap in a match against France. Another highlight of his tour was a hat–trick scored against Newcastle.

== See also ==
- List of Australia national rugby league team players
