= Fred Neumann =

Australian rugby league footballer

Personal information
- Full name: Frederick William Herbert Neumann
- Born: 10 August 1906
- Died: 31 October 1977 (aged 71)

Playing information
- Position: Wing
Representative
| Years | Team | Pld | T | G | FG | P |
|---|---|---|---|---|---|---|
| 1932–33 | Queensland | 8 | 1 | 0 | 0 | 3 |
| 1932 | Australia | 1 | 0 | 0 | 0 | 0 |

Frederick William Herbert Neumann (10 August 1906 – 31 October 1977) was an Australian international rugby league footballer. Allan Border Field in the Brisbane suburb of Albion was formerly named after Neumann.

== Biography ==
Known by the nickname "Firpo", Neumann was a locally produced player for Fortitude Valley and played his rugby league primarily on a wing. He led Fortitude Valley for several seasons and was capped eight times for Queensland. In 1932, Neumann made his only international appearance for Australia against England at the SCG. He also played nine uncapped matches for Australia on their 1933–34 tour of Great Britain.

Neumann served as coach of Queensland in 1947 and 1948, succeeding Herb Steinohrt.
