= Fred Woolley =

Australian rugby league footballer

Personal information
- Full name: Frederick Woolley
- Born: 5 March 1880 Tipton, Staffordshire, England
- Died: 17 January 1955 (aged 74)

Playing information

Rugby union
Club
Years	Team	Pld	T	G	FG	P
190?	Northern Districts
190?	Glebe RFC
190?	Balmain RFC
	Total	0	0	0	0	0

Rugby league
- Position: Fullback
Club
Years	Team	Pld	T	G	FG	P
1908–10	Balmain	25	0	0	0	0
Representative
Years	Team	Pld	T	G	FG	P
1909	New South Wales	4	0	0	0	0
1909	Metropolis	1	0	0	0	0
1909	Australia	2	0	0	0	0
- Source: As of 15 February 2019
- Relatives: Wally Prigg (nephew)

Frederick Woolley (5 March 1880 – 17 January 1955) was an Australian rugby league footballer who played in the 1900s and 1910s. He played for Balmain and represented Australia in 1909.

== Background ==
Woolley played rugby union with Northern Districts, Glebe and Balmain before switching codes to join Balmain in 1908.

== Playing career ==
Woolley was a foundation player for Balmain and played in the club's first ever season which was also the first season of Rugby League in Australia.

In 1909, Woolley was selected to play for Australia, New South Wales and Metropolis.

Woolley played with Balmain until 1910, at which time he returned to Newcastle.

Woolley was the uncle of Australian Rugby League Hall of Fame inductee Wally Prigg.
