= Cliff Pearce =

Australia international rugby league player & coach

Personal information
- Full name: Clifford George Pearce
- Born: 4 April 1907 Uralla, New South Wales, Australia
- Died: 19 July 1976 (aged 69)

Playing information
- Position: Centre
Club
Years	Team	Pld	T	G	FG	P
1929–37	Western Suburbs	79	26	9	0	96
1938–40	North Sydney	5	0	3	0	6
	Total	84	26	12	0	102
Representative
Years	Team	Pld	T	G	FG	P
1928–33	New South Wales	20	4	2	0	16
1928–34	Australia	7	1	0	0	3
1928–29	NSW Country	2	0	0	0	0
1930–33	NSW City	3	2	6	0	18

Coaching information
Club
Years	Team	Gms	W	D	L	W%
1947–48	North Sydney	36	12	3	21	33

Clifford George Pearce (1907–1976) was an Australian rugby league footballer who played in the 1920s, 1930s and 1940s. His primary position was as a centre.

== Club career ==
He first played for Western Suburbs in 1929 and played 65 games for the club between 1929 and 1937, scoring nineteen tries and kicking six goals. During his time at Western Suburbs, Pearce won a premiership in 1930.

He then played for Norths between 1938 and 1940 where he played five first grade games, scoring three goals.

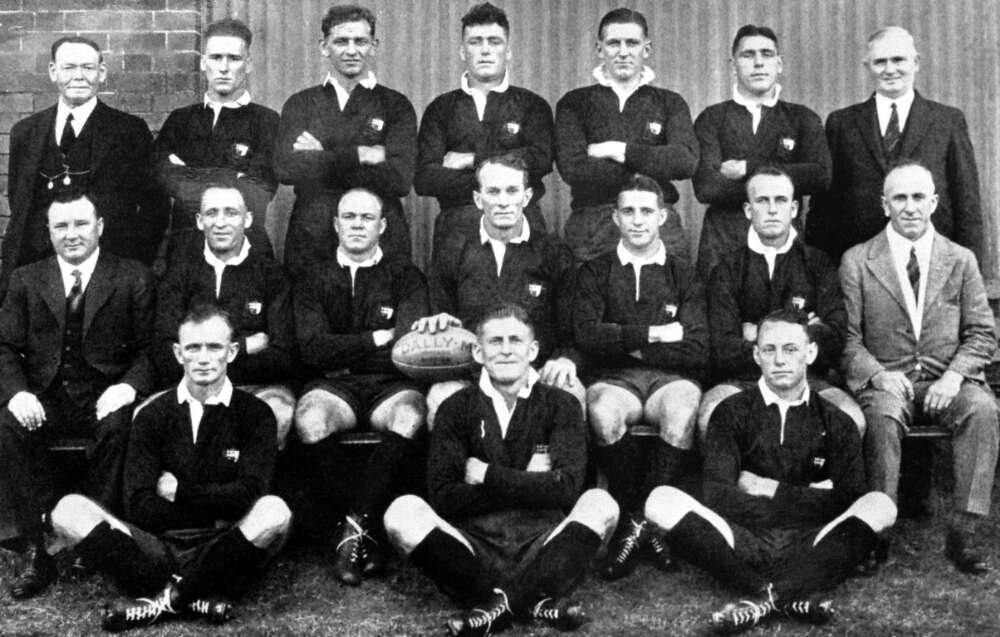
Australian Test side v England 6 Jun 1932, Pearce standing 2nd from right

== Representative career ==
Pearce represented for New South Wales between 1928 and 1933, playing a total of fifteen matches, scoring four tries and two goals.

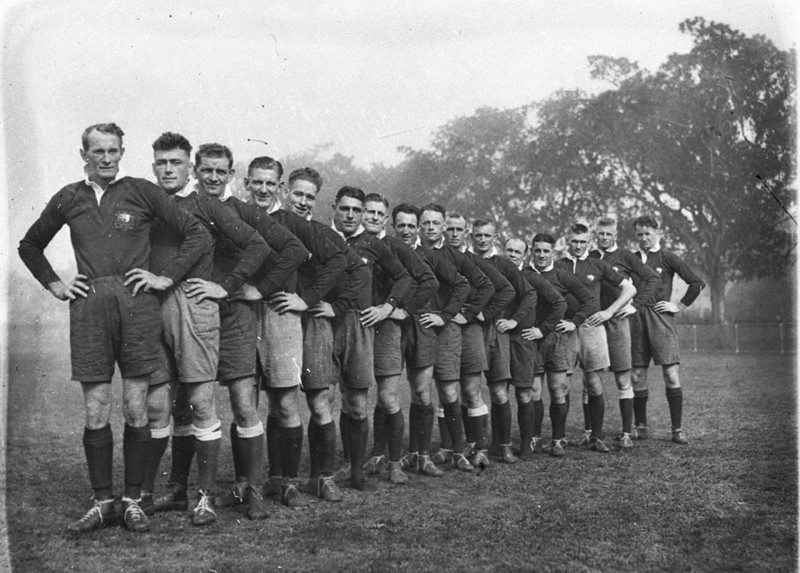
O'Connor sixth in line, Kangaroos squad June 1932

Pearce represented Australia in 1928 and between the years 1932 and 1934, playing seven Tests against England, scoring one try. That one try came on his international debut in the third Test of the 1928 Ashes series. In 1932 he played in three Tests against England and then he was selected on the 1933–34 Kangaroo tour of Great Britain where he played in all three Tests and 24 other tour matches. On this tour he broke his leg in a promotional match which was played against The Rest team. Due to this injury, he missed Western Suburbs' second premiership title.

== Coaching career ==
Pearce coached North Sydney for two seasons between 1947 and 1948.

== Accolades ==
In September 2004 Pearce was named at centre in the Western Suburbs Magpies team of the century.

Sporting positions
Preceded by Harry Forbes; 1946	Coach North Sydney; 1947–1948	Succeeded by Harry McKinnon; 1949
