= Bulimba Cup =

Football competition in Queensland

- Sport: Rugby league
- Instituted: 1925
- Ceased: 1972
- Country: Australia
- Last winners: Brisbane (1972)
- Most titles: Brisbane (19 titles)

The Bulimba Cup was an Australian rugby league football competition contested by the Brisbane, Ipswich and Toowoomba representative rugby league sides during the mid 20th century. In 1931, a team from Lismore, New South Wales participated. It was first contested in 1925 but was cancelled in 1972 due to waning public interest caused by a greater focus on club football in Brisbane.

The Bulimba Cup trophy was provided by the Queensland Brewery.

The competition was normally played as a round-robin with each team playing each other twice. On the rare occasions when teams finished evenly at the conclusion of 6 games, a playoff was held to determine the winner. From 1969 onwards, a final was held.

In 2005 the Queensland Rugby League issued a commemorative jersey to celebrate the 80th anniversary of this competition.

== Winners ==
The competition has been won by Brisbane 19 times, Toowoomba 16 times and Ipswich 11 times.

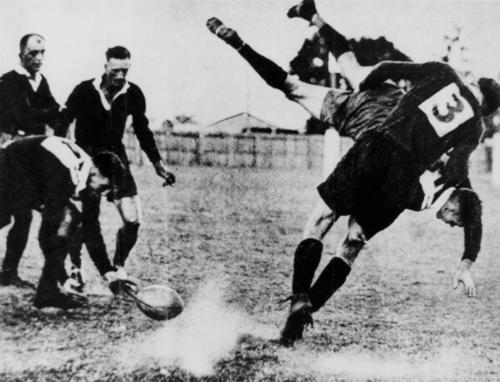
Herb Steinohrt tackling Ipswich player Alan Sherman in the Bulimba Cup in the 1930s

List of Bulimba Cup Champions:

- 1925: Toowoomba
- 1926: Ipswich
- 1927: Toowoomba
- 1928: Toowoomba
- 1929: Ipswich
- 1930: Brisbane
- 1931: Brisbane defeated Toowoomba 24 – 13
- 1932: Brisbane
- 1933: Ipswich
- 1934: Ipswich
- 1935: Ipswich
- 1936: Toowoomba
- 1937: Ipswich
- 1938: Ipswich
- 1939: Ipswich
- 1940: Brisbane
- 1941: Brisbane
- 1942: Not contested due to WWII
- 1943: Not contested due to WWII
- 1944: Toowoomba
- 1945: Toowoomba
- 1946: Brisbane
- 1947: Brisbane
- 1948: Brisbane
- 1949: Brisbane
- 1950: Brisbane
- 1951: Toowoomba
- 1952: Toowoomba
- 1953: Toowoomba
- 1954: Toowoomba
- 1955: Toowoomba
- 1956: Toowoomba
- 1957: Ipswich
- 1958: Ipswich defeated Toowoomba 15 – 10
- 1959: Toowoomba defeated Ipswich 10 – 7
- 1960: Toowoomba
- 1961: Brisbane
- 1962: Brisbane
- 1963: Brisbane
- 1964: Brisbane
- 1965: Toowoomba
- 1966: Ipswich defeated Brisbane 7 – 2
- 1967: Brisbane
- 1968: Brisbane
- 1969: Brisbane defeated Toowoomba 27 – 8
- 1970: Toowoomba defeated Brisbane 18 – 17
- 1971: Brisbane defeated Toowoomba 22 – 13
- 1972: Brisbane defeated Toowoomba 55 – 2 at Lang Park

== Records ==
=== Most games played ===
Games played	Player	Team
59	Herb Steinohrt	Toowoomba
53	Les "Monty" Heidke	Ipswich
52	Mick Madsen	Toowoomba
48	Kev Boshammer	Toowoomba
47	Bill "Circy" Smith	Ipswich

=== Most tries scored ===
Tries scored	Player	Team
27	Des McGovern	Toowoomba
24	Denis "Flaggy" Flannery	Ipswich
24	Ed "Babe" Collins	Brisbane
24	Herb Steinohrt	Toowoomba
23	Lionel Morgan	Brisbane

=== Most points scored ===
Tries scored	Player	Team
186	Bill "Bricky" Ryan	Ipswich
181	Norm Pope	Brisbane
147	Lionel Morgan	Brisbane
135	Danny O'Connor	Brisbane
107	Peter Lobegeiger	Brisbane
106	Alan Rissman	Toowoomba
