= Wally Prigg =

Australia international rugby league footballer

Personal information
- Full name: Walter Joseph Prigg
- Born: 17 October 1908 Hamilton, New South Wales, Australia
- Died: 8 September 1980 (aged 71) Adamstown, New South Wales, Australia

Playing information
- Position: Five-eighth, Lock
Club
Years	Team	Pld	T	G	FG	P
1927–28	Wests (Newcastle)
1928–39	Centrals (Newcastle)
	Total	0	0	0	0	0
Representative
Years	Team	Pld	T	G	FG	P
1929–39	New South Wales	34	13	0	0	39
1929–38	Australia	19	4	0	0	12
- Relatives: Fred Woolley (uncle)

Wally Prigg (1908–1980) was an Australian rugby league footballer. He was a lock for the Australian national rugby league team. He played nineteen Tests for the Kangaroos between 1929 and 1938, seven as captain and was the first Australian player to make three tours to Great Britain with the Australian national rugby league team. He has been named amongst the nation's finest footballers of the 20th century.

== Club and state playing career ==
Prigg back right with headgear before 1stTest Oct 1929

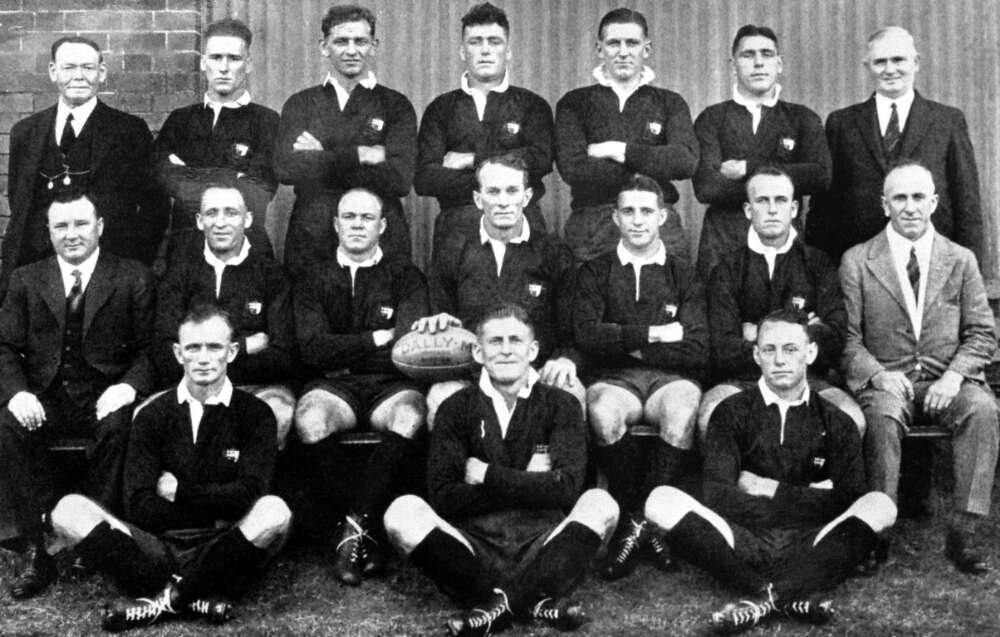
Run-on Test side 6 Jun 1932, Prigg, back row 2nd from left

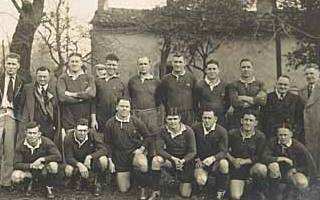
Prigg with the 1937–38 Kangaroos, 2nd row far left

Wally Prigg was one of the great forwards in the history of rugby league. He spent his whole career as a Newcastle Wests and Central Charlestown player. He was the first New South Wales country based player to captain the Australian national rugby league team.

He made his first appearance for New South Wales at the age of 20. Between 1929 and 1939 he made 32 appearances for New South Wales, a record at the time. He scored twelve tries, thirty-six points for New South Wales. During his career he revolutionized the position of lock. His game was based around short passing and close support play.

== Australian representative career ==
Prigg was selected to make the 1929–30 Kangaroo tour of Great Britain, playing in the 1st and 2nd test matches against the Lions and in a match against Wales. During the 1932 Great Britain Lions tour Prigg was selected to play for Australia in the 1st Ashes test match. He was selected to go on the 1933–34 Kangaroo tour of Great Britain, playing in all 3 Ashes test matches. He toured with Australia on their tours of New Zealand in 1935 and 1937 and on the Kangaroo Tour of England in 1937–1938 when he was tour captain. He played in all five Tests of that tour as captain and in 24 minor matches. He was the first man to be picked for three Kangaroo tours. His leadership style and skills were respected by English fans. His final Test match for Australia was the first ever between Australia and France in 1938. Prigg retired with the record for most Test caps for the Kangaroos, breaking the record set by original Kangaroo tourist Sid Pearce, Prigg played 19 Tests for Australia between 1929 and 1938. He scored a total of four tries (twelve 12 points) for Australia.

== Accolades ==
Post football Prigg operated a general store in the Newcastle suburb of Hamilton. He died in 1980 at the age of 71. In 2003 he was admitted into the Australian Rugby League Hall of Fame. In February 2008, Prigg was named in the list of Australia's 100 Greatest Players (1908–2007) which was commissioned by the NRL and ARL to celebrate the code's centenary year in Australia.

In 2008 Prigg was named in New South Wales' rugby league team of the century.

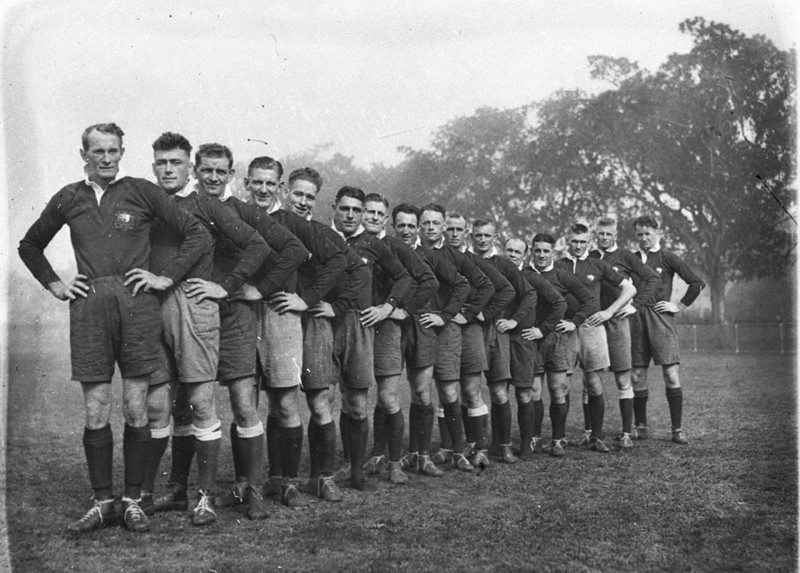
Prigg fifth from left, Kangaroos 1stTest Jun 1932

== Footnotes ==
Preceded by Dave Brown	Australian national rugby league captain 1937-38	Succeeded by Joe Jorgenson
