= Roy Thompson (rugby league) =

Australian rugby league coach & footballer

Personal information
- Full name: Roy Thompson
- Born: 22 March 1916; Sydney, New South Wales, Australia
- Died: 9 June 2001 (aged 85)

Playing information
- Position: Five-eighth, Halfback
Club
Years	Team	Pld	T	G	FG	P
1935–42	North Sydney	63	11	153	0	339
Representative
Years	Team	Pld	T	G	FG	P
1938–40	New South Wales	9	3	34	0	77
1936–38	NSW City	4	1	7	0	17

Coaching information
Club
Years	Team	Gms	W	D	L	W%
1941	North Sydney	14	3	1	10	21

Roy Thompson (1916–2001) was an Australian rugby league footballer who played in the 1930s and 1940s. Thompson played his entire career for North Sydney in the NSWRL competition as a Five-Eighth and also as a halfback.

== Playing career ==
Thompson began his first grade career for Norths in Round 1 of the 1935 season against Canterbury. Norths went on to qualify for the finals that year and Thompson finished as top point scorer at the club. The following year in 1936, Norths again qualified for the finals but lost to Balmain, Thompson finished as top point scorer for the club once more. In 1937, Thompson was selected to represent NSW City against the NSW Country side and in 1938 was selected to play for New South Wales. Between 1938 and 1940, Thompson played six consecutive games for New South Wales against Queensland with fellow North Sydney teammate Rex Harrison. Thompson went on to play with North Sydney up until the end of 1942 before leaving the club to serve in World War 2. The following year, North Sydney reached the grand final against Newtown. He died on 9 June 2001.

Sporting positions
Preceded by Arthur Halloway; 1940–1941	Coach North Sydney; 1941	Succeeded by Jack O' Reilly; 1942
