= Frank Griffiths (rugby league) =

Australia international rugby league footballer

Personal information
- Full name: Frank Griffiths
- Born: 7 November 1911; Geelong, Victoria, Australia
- Died: 15 November 1997 (aged 86)

Playing information
- Position: Prop
Club
Years	Team	Pld	T	G	FG	P
1935–41	Balmain	56	8	0	0	24
Representative
Years	Team	Pld	T	G	FG	P
1937	NSW City	1	0	0	0	0
1937	Australia	1	0	0	0	0
- Source: As of 20 January 2025

Frank Griffiths was an Australian rugby league footballer who played in the 1930s and 1940s. He played for Balmain in the NSWRL Competition.

== Playing career ==
Griffiths made his first grade debut for Balmain against Western Suburbs in Round 15 1935 at the Sydney Sports Ground.

In 1936, Griffiths played at prop in the 1936 NSWRL grand final against Eastern Suburbs. Griffiths scored a try in the match which was comprehensively won by Easts 32–12.

In 1937, Griffiths was selected to play for NSW City. In 1939, Griffiths only managed 3 appearances for Balmain and missed out on playing in the club's grand final victory over South Sydney.

Griffiths played with Balmain up until the end of 1941 before retiring.
