= Fortitude Valley Diehards =

Australian semi-pro rugby league club, based in Brisbane, QLD

Club information
- Full name: Fortitude Valley Football Club
- Nickname(s): Diehards, Valleys
- Colours: Royal Blue
- Readmitted: 2015; 11 years ago
- Website: Official website

Current details
- Ground: Emerson Park, Grange, Queensland
- CEO: Danny Walker
- Coach: Nathan Hughes
- Manager: Blake Marshall
- Captain: Liam Herrington
- Competition: Brisbane Rugby League premiership (to 1995); Brisbane Rugby League (from 2015)
- Current season

Records
- Premierships: 24 (1909, 1911 (as Valley-Toombul), 1914, 1915, 1917, 1918, 1919, 1924, 1931, 1933, 1937, 1941, 1944, 1946, 1955, 1957, 1970, 1971, 1973, 1974, 1979, 1988 (as Seagulls-Diehards), 1989, 1990)
- Runners-up: 15 (1916, 1923, 1930, 1935, 1936, 1938, 1943, 1958, 1960, 1961, 1962, 1965, 1969, 1972, 1978)
- Minor premierships: 26 (1911 (as Valley-Toombul), 1914, 1917, 1919, 1923, 1924, 1931, 1936, 1937, 1938, 1941, 1942, 1943, 1944, 1955, 1960, 1964, 1965, 1967, 1971, 1973, 1979, 1980, 1982, 1989, 1990)
- Wooden spoons: 3 (1948, 1951, 1975)
- Premierships (2nd grade): 0
- Wooden spoons (2nd grade): 1 (1995)
- Premierships (3rd grade): 2 (2017, 2021)
- Runners-up (3rd grade): 1 (2019)

The Fortitude Valley Diehards, often referred to simply as Valleys, are an Australian semi-professional rugby league football club based in the Brisbane suburb of Fortitude Valley.

== History ==
Until their demise in 1995, the Fortitude Valley Diehards were the oldest surviving rugby league team in Brisbane, Australia, being formed—and winning the first Brisbane Rugby League premiership—in 1909. They have roots tracing to 1908 and the first rugby league game in the state, between North Brisbane and Toombul, who would combine with Valleys in 1911.

They were by far and away Brisbane’s most successful rugby league team and one of the greatest clubs in Australian history, having won a total of 24 premierships in their 86 seasons, including seven of the first eleven. With the introduction of the Brisbane Broncos into the New South Wales Rugby League in 1988, Valleys formed a short-lived joint venture with the Tweed Heads Seagulls playing under the name Seagulls-Diehards, winning the 1988 premiership. The joint venture broke soon after and Valleys returned to their old name in 1989.

Financial difficulties in the early 1990s took their toll on the club, leading Valleys to a short-lived merger with the Caboolture Snakes, calling themselves Caboolture Valleys, in 1995. However the club folded at season’s end, preventing the foundation club from playing in the inaugural Queensland Cup in 1996.

In 2002, Valleys entered a partnership with another former Brisbane Rugby League team, Brothers, playing under the name Brothers-Valleys. Playing out of Perry Park, in the Brisbane suburb of Bowen Hills, approximately halfway between Fortitude Valley and Albion, the Two-Blues participated in the Mixwell Cup and Mixwell Colts Challenge, before being accepted into the Queensland Cup for Season 2004. Based at O'Callaghan Park in Zillmere, the club’s only premiership points that season were from a first round draw. At season’s end, Brothers Valleys announced a name change to Brothers Diehards, but were not accepted into the 2005 Queensland Cup, on the basis of club finance.

The Diehards still however compete in the Amateur Brisbane Second Division along with other Brisbane Clubs.

The club was readmitted to the Brisbane Rugby League in 2015.

Perhaps the best year for Valleys was their 1955 success during which the side remained undefeated under the leadership of fullback Norm Pope.

As of 2021 Valleys compete in the QRL Women's Premiership, which is the strongest state-based competition in QLD. Their side features a number of representative players including Shenae Ciesiolka, Meg Ward, Ali Brigginshaw, Brianna Clark, Kody House and Lavinia Gould. They are coached by former international and Queensland representative NRL star Scott Prince.

== Crest ==
Until it was forced upon them, Valleys never had an official moniker. Although they were nicknamed the "Diehards", which came about from their reported "Diehard spirit" in tough games, until the Queensland Rugby League's rebranding process in the 1980s, which saw all BRL clubs adopt a logo framed by a stylised Q, Valleys identified themselves with a simple VFC (Valleys Football Club) monogram. With the introduction of the new logo in the 1980s, the monogram was relocated to the shield of the newly adopted Gladiator moniker, although for the next few seasons, the monogram remained on the jersey beneath the AVCO sponsorship logo.

== Colours ==
Valleys had a very traditional playing strip, and were the simplest of the Brisbane Rugby League clubs. Their colours were royal blue, with a white collar, and a white butcher stripe (irregular hoop) vertically on each side of the shorts. Their socks were blue, although again were complemented by a white butcher stripe in the middle on occasion. The VFC monogram was white, as was the majority of sponsorship logos placed on the jersey.

== Home ground ==
Although not technically in the Fortitude Valley area, the Diehards played out of what was then known as Neumann Oval in Albion, in the same area as the Albion Park trots and Brothers Rugby Union's Crosby Park. Following the Diehards departure for Caboolture, and eventual extinction, in 1995, Queensland Cricket purchased the ground and renamed it Allan Border Field. Currently Valleys Juniors, who evolved from the BRL team in 1951, play full-time at Emerson Park, Grange, and have done so since gradually moving out of Neumann Oval in the early 1970s.

== Junior Clubs ==
Valleys Juniors, Valleys Hawthorne and Valleys United Stars (now Easts Bulimba Stars) were the only junior clubs that belonged to Valleys.

== Representative Players ==
=== Australia ===
- Vic Armbruster
- Barry Brennan
- Edward Buckley
- Chris Close
- Arthur Edwards
- Vince Fawcett
- Declan Bradbury
- Duncan Hall
- Mark Hohn
- Jack Horrigan
- Wally Lewis
- Jack Little
- Ken McCaffery
- Mark Murray
- Bryan Niebling
- Fred Neumann
- Norm Pope
- Ross Strudwick
- Roy Westaway

=== Great Britain ===
- Tulsen Tollett

=== Queensland (State of Origin) ===
- Gavin Allen
- Chris Close
- Ross Henrick
- Mark Hohn
- Wally Lewis
- Norm McGregor
- Mark Murray
- Bryan Niebling
- Grant Rix
- Shenae Ciesiolka

=== Queensland (Residents) ===
- Mark Shipway
- David Bourke
- Shane Buckley
- Nicholas Butler
- Ty Carlyon
- Peter Coyne
- Brett Daunt
- Kelly Egan
- Bill Holmes
- Eric Kennedy
- Gerard Kerr
- Steele Retchless
- Frank Rolls
- Shaun Rubesaame
- Trevor Schodel
- Craig Marshall
- Greg Walker

Pre State of Origin/Bulimba Cup Albert Park

== Sponsors ==
- Bank of Qld Stafford
- Adenbrook Homes
- Scotch & Soda
- Elevate Training
- LOCO Earthmoving

== Sources ==
- Lester, Gary. The Sun Book of Rugby League
- Lester, Gary. Action '85
