= Percy Williams (Australian rugby league player) =

Australian RL coach and former Australia international rugby league footballer

Personal information
- Full name: Percy Edmund Williams
- Born: 22 August 1910 Marrickville, New South Wales, Australia
- Died: 10 July 1996 (aged 85) Ramsgate, New South Wales, Australia

Playing information
- Position: Five-eighth, Halfback
Club
Years	Team	Pld	T	G	FG	P
1931–38	South Sydney	80	19	186	0	429
1940–41	Newtown	22	1	38	0	79
	Total	102	20	224	0	508
Representative
Years	Team	Pld	T	G	FG	P
1932–38	New South Wales	15	3	18	0	45
1937	Australia	4	0	2	0	4
1933–38	NSW City	4	1	16	0	35
1932	Metropolis	2	0	4	0	8
1936	NSW Country	1	0	1	0	2

Coaching information
Club
Years	Team	Gms	W	D	L	W%
1941	Newtown	14	6	2	6	43
1945	St. George	14	4	2	9	29
1948	Eastern Suburbs	18	7	2	9	39
	Total	46	17	6	24	37

Percy Edmund Williams (1910–1996) was an Australian rugby league player who played in the 1930s and 1940s.

== Playing career ==
A Souths junior, Williams became a long serving and valuable member of the South Sydney club in the 1930s. He played seven seasons with South Sydney between 1931 and 1938 and also captained the club during the mid-1930s.

Williams was a dual premiership winner with Souths, playing halfback in the 1931 and 1932 Grand Final teams.

Williams represented New South Wales on 15 occasions between 1932 and 1938 and was selected on the 1937–38 Kangaroo Tour, playing in two tests against England and two tests against New Zealand. He finished his career at Newtown, playing two seasons (1940–1941) and was captain-coach in 1941. Later, he coached St George Dragons in 1945 and Eastern Suburbs in 1948.

== Death ==
Williams died on 10 July 1996, 43 days short of his 86th birthday.
