= Harry Forbes (rugby league) =

Australian rugby league footballer and coach

Personal information
- Full name: Harry Herbert Forbes
- Born: 14 March 1914 Annandale, New South Wales
- Died: 19 April 1995 (aged 81) Sydney

Playing information
- Position: Prop, Second-row
Club
Years	Team	Pld	T	G	FG	P
1934–39	North Sydney	14	3	0	0	9

Coaching information
Club
Years	Team	Gms	W	D	L	W%
1946	North Sydney	14	5	0	9	36
- Source: Whiticker/Hudson

Harrie Herbert 'Harry' Forbes (1914–1995) was an Australian rugby league footballer who played in the 1930s and 1940s. He later became an administrator.

Harry 'Akka' Forbes was a legendary figure at North Sydney, initially as a player, then a coach and later the secretary of the club for over 30 years.

== Playing career ==
Forbes played five seasons in first grade with North Sydney between 1934 and 1939. He retired from playing after captaining Norths reserve grade team to the premiership in 1940.

== Coaching career ==
Forbes immediately began coaching at the club, winning the reserve grade premiership again in 1942, and became first grade coach in 1946. Forbes was also instrumental in procuring Frank Hyde to Norths in 1943. He later began a thirty-year association with Norths as club secretary, retiring in the 1980s. Forbes was voted the premiership's most popular player by the Daily Mirror Newspaper in 1939.

Harry 'Akka' Forbes died on 19 April 1995, aged 81.

Sporting positions
Preceded by Frank Burge; 1945	Coach North Sydney; 1946	Succeeded by Cliff Pearce; 1947–1948
