= Jack Little (rugby league) =

Australian rugby league footballer (1910–1995)

Personal information
- Born: 12 October 1910 Armidale, NSW, Australia
- Died: 29 May 1995 (aged 84)

Playing information
- Position: Hooker
Representative
Years	Team	Pld	T	G	FG	P
1931–41	Queensland	31	4	22	0	56
1932–33	Australia	1	0	0	0	0

Jack Little (12 October 1910 – 29 May 1995) was an Australian rugby league footballer.

Born in Armidale, New South Wales, Little spent his career with several clubs north of the border, including Fortitude Valley, and regularly featured for Queensland through the 1930s.

Little was the hooker for Australia in the opening Test match against the touring Great British team at the Sydney Cricket Ground in 1932, during which he suffered a leg injury that left him hospitalised. His Kangaroos career also included non–international matches on their 1933–34 tour of Great Britain.
