= Bill Smith (rugby league) =

Australian rugby league footballer (1904–1987)

Personal information
- Full name: Charles William John Smith
- Born: 29 May 1904 Ipswich, Queensland, Australia
- Died: 6 September 1987 (aged 83)

Playing information
- Position: Fullback
Representative
Years	Team	Pld	T	G	FG	P
1925–36	Queensland	38	1	0	0	3
1933	Australia	2	1	0	0	3

Charles William John Smith (29 May 1904 – 6 September 1987) was an Australian rugby league footballer.

Known by the nickname "Circy", short for circus, Smith was a reliable fullback who possessed safe ball handling and an accurate punt kick, while lacking in any considerable pace.

Smith debuted for Ipswich in 1924 and the following year first represented Queensland when a second string side was selected against New South Wales. He became Queensland's regular fullback from 1928 onwards, then in 1933 gained a place on Australia's tour of Great Britain, playing matches against England and Wales.
