= Jack Woods (rugby league) =

GB & England international rugby league footballer

Personal information
- Full name: John Tesseyman Woods
- Born: 4 September 1907; Barrow, Lancashire
- Died: 7 April 1965 (aged 57); Ince, Lancashire, England

Playing information
- Position: Wing
Club
Years	Team	Pld	T	G	FG	P
≤1930–34	Barrow		139
1934–35	Warrington	14	5			15
1935–≥35	Barrow
	Total	14	144	0	0	15
Representative
Years	Team	Pld	T	G	FG	P
1930–33	Lancashire	9	5	0	0	15
1930–33	England	3	1	0	0	3
1933	Great Britain	1	1	0	0	3

John Tesseyman Woods (4 September 1907 – 7 April 1965), also known by the nickname of "Tank", was an English professional rugby league footballer who played in the 1930s. He played at representative level for Great Britain and England, and at club level for Barrow, Warrington and Liverpool Stanley as a wing.

== Playing career ==
=== Club career ===
Woods spent most of his career at Barrow, and is sixth on the club's all time try scorers list with 139-tries.

Woods made his début for Warrington on 3 February 1934, and he played his last match for Warrington on 31 August 1935.

=== International honours ===
Woods won caps for England while playing at Barrow in 1930 against Other Nationalities, in 1930 against Wales, in 1933 against Other Nationalities, and won a cap for Great Britain while playing at Barrow in 1933 against Australia.
