= Mick Madsen =

Australian rugby league footballer

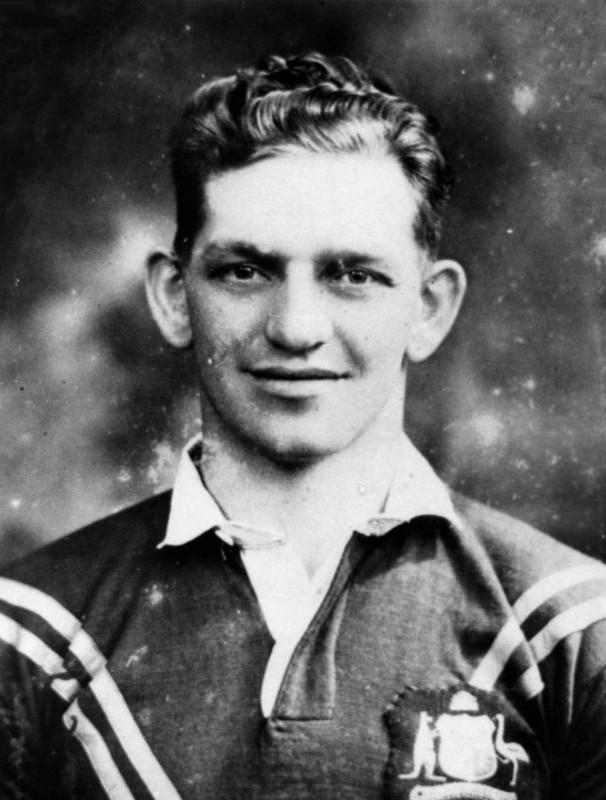

Personal information
- Full name: Peter Madsen
- Born: 16 September 1900 Tannymorel, Queensland, Australia
- Died: 2 February 1979 (aged 78) Toowoomba, Queensland, Australia

Playing information
- Position: Forward
Club
Years	Team	Pld	T	G	FG	P
1921–37	Brothers (Toowoomba)
Representative
Years	Team	Pld	T	G	FG	P
1928–37	Queensland	48	5	0	0	15
1929–36	Australia	12	0	0	0	0
1925–37	Toowoomba	60	3	0	0	9
- Source: As of 28 July 2025

Peter "Mick" Madsen (16 September 1900 – 2 February 1979) was an Australian rugby league footballer. He was a front-row forward for the Australian national team. He played in nine Tests between 1929 and 1936 as captain on one occasion and has since been named as one of the nation's finest footballers of the 20th century. He was known as a player who possessed freak strength and courage.

== Biography ==
Born in Tannymorel near Warwick, Queensland he attended Toowoomba Grammar School and played rugby league there. He was a seasonal labourer in country Queensland when at age 20 he played in a game against the visiting Toowoomba Brothers club who signed him up. Madsen went on to play his entire first grade career of 17 seasons with the Brothers club. He first represented for Queensland at age 27 and then consistently for the next 9 years making a then record of 34 appearances against New South Wales. He made his Test debut against England in the first Test of the 1929–30 Kangaroo tour of Great Britain. He played in the 2nd Test loss and 17 tour matches before a broken jaw rule him out of further appearances. He played in all three Tests of the 1932 Ashes series in Australia.

Madsen made his 2nd Kangaroo Tour on the 1933–34 tour to Great Britain and played in 25 tour matches and three Tests. He made his sole appearance as captain of the Kangaroos in the 2nd Test at Headingley in November 1933 following injury to tour captain Frank McMillan. Australia lost the game 7–5 in front of a crowd of 30,000 with all of Australia's points scored by the 1930s point scoring sensation Dave Brown.

At thirty-four years of age Madsen was recalled to the 1936 Australian side in the Third Test against England in Sydney. A late call up, Madsen was the first Australian player to fly to a Test match.

Kangaroos 1st Test 1929. Madsen standing, 4th from left

His last first grade game was at age thirty-eight. In retirement he remained a notable Toowoomba identity. Madsen finished his career with 149 first class games and 12 tries.

== Accolades ==
In February 2008, Madsen was named in the list of Australia's 100 Greatest Players (1908–2007) which was commissioned by the NRL and ARL to celebrate the code's centenary year in Australia. In June 2008, he was chosen in the Queensland Rugby League's Team of the Century at prop-forward. He was also one of twenty players to be named in Warwick Rugby League's Team of the Century. In 2008, rugby league in Australia's centenary year, Madsen was named at front row forward in the Toowoomba and South West Team of the Century. In 2008, Madsen was inducted into the Nation Rugby League Hall of Fame as Inductee 26. In the Toowoomba Rugby League Competition, there is a mid season Grand Final for the top 2 teams in the competition. This is called Madsen Rasmussen Trophy named in honour of Madsen and Elton Rasmussen.

== Sources ==
- Whiticker, Alan (2004) Captaining the Kangaroos, New Holland, Sydney
- Andrews, Malcolm (2006) The ABC of Rugby League Austn Broadcasting Corpn, Sydney
- Queensland Team of the Century named – article at nz.leagueunlimited.com

Preceded by Frank McMillan	Australian national rugby league captain 1933	Succeeded by Dave Brown
