= Melville Glasheen =

Australian rugby league footballer (1904–1971)

Personal information
- Born: 26 September 1904 Ravenswood, Queensland, Australia
- Died: 2 September 1971 (aged 66)

Playing information
- Position: Hooker
Representative
Years	Team	Pld	T	G	FG	P
1932–34	Queensland	3	0	0	0	0
1933	Australia

Melville Glasheen (26 September 1904 – 2 September 1971) was an Australian rugby league footballer.

Glasheen hailed from the Queensland town of Ravenswood and attended Townsville Grammar School.

A hooker, Glasheen got his start with Townsville club Estates and came to the attention of Australian selectors through representative appearances for North Queensland. He was controversially overlooked for a place in the Kangaroos squad for their 1933–34 tour of Great Britain, before receiving a late call up as an injury replacement. This gave him the distinction of being the first North Queensland product to gain national representative honours.
