= Fred Gilbert (rugby league) =

Australian rugby league footballer

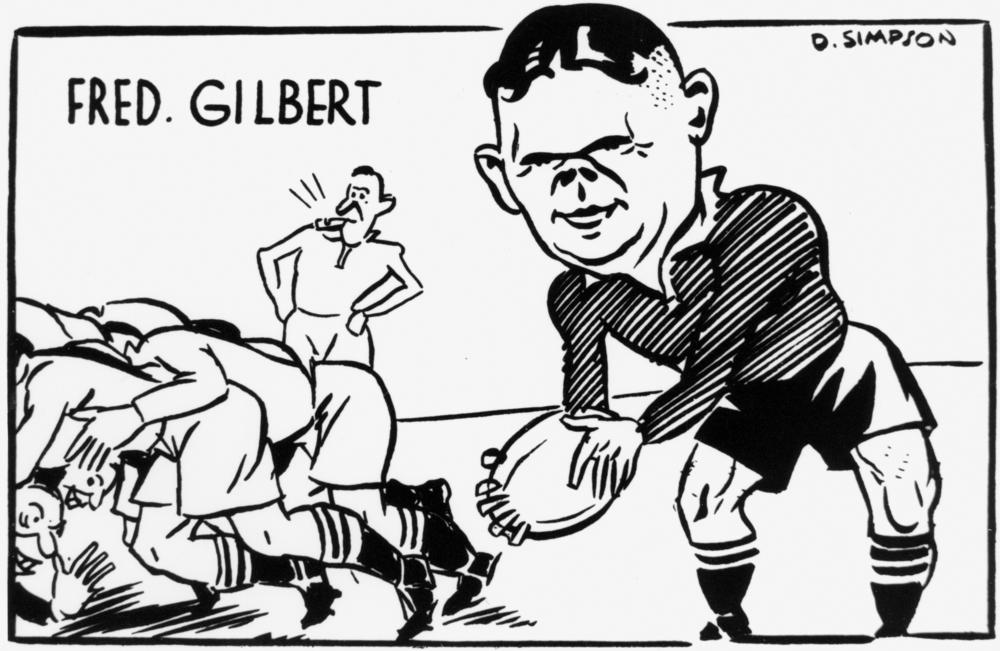

Personal information
- Full name: Frederick Michael Gilbert
- Born: 19 December 1910
- Died: 20 December 1972 (aged 62)

Playing information
- Position: Halfback
Representative
Years	Team	Pld	T	G	FG	P
1932–39	Queensland	28	13	35	0	109
1936–38	Australia	4	2	0	0	6

Frederick Michael Gilbert (19 December 1910 – 20 December 1972) was an Australian rugby league footballer.

== Biography ==
Gilbert was a native of Maryborough and attended Bundaberg Christian Brothers' High School.

Active in the 1930s, Gilbert was a quick and elusive halfback, originally from the Christian Brothers club of Maryborough. He had moved on to Valleys in Toowoomba when he made the 1933–34 Great Britain touring squad as a back up halfback, but he would only get to play the occasional fixture, none of which were Test matches. In 1936, Gilbert gained his first Test cap when he deputised for Viv Thicknesse in the final international against Great Britain at the SCG. He had a larger role on the 1937–38 Kangaroo tour, where his appearances included three international matches, one against England and two against France.
