= Jim Gibbs =

Australian rugby league footballer

Jimmy Gibbs
Personal information
- Full name: James Gibbs
- Born: 9 April 1909 Greymouth, New Zealand
- Died: September 1996 (aged 87) Newcastle, New South Wales

Playing information
- Position: Forward
Club
Years	Team	Pld	T	G	FG	P
1927–??	South Newcastle
1940	Canterbury-Bankstown	13	4	5	0	22
19??–46	South Newcastle
	Total	13	4	5	0	22
Representative
Years	Team	Pld	T	G	FG	P
1933–39	New South Wales	24	6	0	0	18
1934	Country NSW	2	0	0	0	0
1933–38	Australia	7	0	0	0	0

Jim Gibbs (9 April 1909 – September 1996) was an Australian professional rugby league footballer who played in the 1920s, 1930s and 1940s. An Australian international and New South Wales interstate representative forward, he played club football in the Newcastle Rugby League for Souths and in Sydney's NSWRFL Premiership for Canterbury-Bankstown.

Gibbs was born in New Zealand and in 1911 at age two his family moved to Australia and settled in Glebe, New South Wales. He began his senior football career in 1927 and was one of five brothers that played for South Newcastle. The others were Jack, Bill, Harry and Alf. Alf would also go on to be an Australian Test front-rower.

Gibbs was first selected to represent New South Wales in 1933 and was then selected to go on the 1933–34 Kangaroo tour of Great Britain. He made his debut in 1933, becoming Kangaroo No. 184 and Newcastle's fourth international in the process. He also played in the tour of New Zealand in 1935. He was selected to go on the 1937-38 Kangaroo tour.

Gibbs joined Canterbury-Bankstown for the 1940 NSWRFL season where he was able to secure a first grade position and play in the final against Eastern Suburbs before returning to Newcastle. He played his last game for South Newcastle in 1946.

Gibbs also served overseas in the Royal Australian Air Force in the City of Canberra bomber squadron during World War II.

Such was the influence that Gibbs and his brothers had on the South Newcastle club, a park in Merewether was renamed Gibbs Brothers Oval in 1988. In 2008, Australia's centenary year of rugby league, Gibbs was named at second-row forward in a Newcastle Rugby League team of the century. Gibbs was also named in a South Newcastle team of the century in 2010.
