= Interstate Rugby League in Australia (1908–1981) =

Interstate Series
- Sport: Rugby League
- Inaugural season: 1908
- Ceased: 1981
- Replaced by: State of Origin series
- Number of teams: 2
- Country: Australia
- Holders: New South Wales (1981)
- Most titles: New South Wales (54 titles)

The Interstate Rugby League Series refers to Australian Rugby league matches played between the New South Wales rugby league team, colloquially known as the 'Blues', and the Queensland rugby league team, known as the 'Maroons', between 1908 and 1981. The Interstate Series concept was based upon the state of residency of the player, however, due to NSW disinterest from 1962 to 1981, the State of Origin concept was initiated in 1980, and after two successful years with single matches, the subsequent origin concept became a three game series and the Interstate Series was scrapped in 1982.

== History ==
Since the beginning of Australian rugby league in 1908, an interstate competition between New South Wales and Queensland has been conducted from almost annually (except during World War I, the Spanish Flu epidemic and World War II). Until 1982 each team drew its players from the clubs based in that state. No consideration was given to the origins of the players themselves.

The first of these interstate games was played at Sydney's Agricultural Ground on 11 July 1908, before Queensland had even commenced its club competition. New South Wales easily accounted for Queensland in a 43–0 victory. The local media were unimpressed.

'There can be no doubt the NSW men are improving a good deal... They cannot be blamed for the farce, for it was nothing else. If the Australian team depends on Queenslanders to strengthen it, one is afraid it will be found wanting. They are quite the weakest lot of footballers I have even seen come down from Queensland. The play needs no detailed description as it was simply a practice match for NSW, and certainly did not advantageously advertise the new game.'
–The Sydney Morning Herald, 13 July 1908

The interstate series was dominated by New South Wales, apart from a golden period for Queensland in the 1920s. From 1922 to 1925 Queensland defeated New South Wales 11 times in 12 matches. At the end of the 1925 season, a Kangaroo team was to be picked for touring Great Britain. Instead of announcing an Australian team dominated by Queenslanders, the Australian Rugby League Board of Control informed the media that the Rugby Football League had decided that the Kiwis would provide stronger opposition and that there would be no Australian tour. The period spanning 1922 to 1929 saw no Australian team play in Great Britain, the only such hiatus outside the two World Wars.

The New South Wales dominance of interstate football increased after 1956 when gaming machines were legalised for all registered clubs in New South Wales. This provided New South Wales football clubs with a revenue source unmatched by Queensland clubs. From this time on an increasing number of Queensland players moved to the much stronger Sydney competition, becoming ineligible for Queensland state selection. Paul Hogan famously told a Queensland Rugby League gathering in 1977 that "every time Queensland produces a good footballer, he finishes up being processed through a New South Wales poker machine."

Before 1956, NSW had won 75% and Qld only 25% of series played. From 1956 to 1981, NSW dominance soared even higher and Qld wins dwindled to only 3.8% with only 1 series win, in 1959.

== Interstate Series Results (1908–1981) ==
During the Interstate Series era, there were 66 series played, with New South Wales winning 50, Queensland winning 10, and 6 being draws. However, on each of the 6 occasions there was a drawn series, the previous year's winner retained the title, with 4 being retained by NSW and 2 by QLD, meaning NSW won 54 titles and QLD 12 titles during the Interstate Series era.

Notable runs of consecutive titles were NSW, 20 in a row (1962–81), NSW 9 in a row in intermittent early years (1908, 1910–13, 1915, 1919–21), NSW 7 in a row around WWII (1941, 1945–50) and again in the 1950s (1952–58), NSW 6 in a row (1933–39), QLD 5 in a row (1922-26), and QLD 3 in a row (1959–61). The 1973 series was also notable for New South Wales' complete shutout of Queensland in the series, with margins of 16–0, 10-0 and 26-0 across the three games for a series margin of 52–0.

Due to many factors, anywhere between one and five games were played in a series over the course of the competition.

NSW v QLD Interstate Rugby League Results 1908–1981
Year	Series Winner	Margin	Matches				
Year	Series Winner	Margin	Game 1	Game 2	Game 3	Game 4	Game 5
1908	New South Wales	2–0	NSW 43–0	NSW 12–3			
1910	New South Wales	3–0	NSW 40–21	NSW 32–18	NSW 19–3		
1911	New South Wales	3–0	NSW 65–9	NSW 49–0	NSW 32–8		
1912	New South Wales	2–0	NSW 65–9	NSW 32–4			
1913	New South Wales	2–0	NSW 27–12	NSW 21–17			
1915	New South Wales	2–0	NSW 53–9	NSW 39–6			
1919	New South Wales	2–0	NSW 33–18	NSW 12–7	NSW 24–10		
1920	New South Wales	1–0	NSW 40–18				
1921	New South Wales	2–0	NSW 37–11	NSW 34–20			
1922	Queensland	1–0	QLD 25–9				
1923	Queensland	2–0	QLD 18–13	QLD 25–10			
1924	Queensland	3–0	QLD 22–20	QLD 20–7	QLD 36–6		
1925	Queensland	4–1	QLD 23–15	QLD 27–13	NSW 27–16	QLD 26–8	QLD 23–18
1926	Queensland	3–2	NSW 30–17	NSW 5–3	QLD 26–11	QLD 38–0	QLD 37–19
1927	New South Wales	3–1	NSW 14–10	NSW 13–11	QLD 11–7	NSW 15–11	
1928	Queensland	3–1	QLD 25–9	NSW 16–7	QLD 28–17	QLD 21–10	
1929	New South Wales	5–0	NSW 21–8	NSW 17–8	NSW 12–10	NSW 16–14	NSW 11–8
1930	New South Wales	2–1	NSW 16–11	QLD 25–11	NSW 15–12		
1931	Queensland	3–2	NSW 39–17	QLD 23–20	NSW 28–6	QLD 15–8	QLD 4–3
1932	Queensland	2–0	QLD 23–15	Draw 9–9	QLD 19–9		
1933	New South Wales	3–1	NSW 24–0	NSW 15–13	NSW 17–14	QLD 10–8	
1934	New South Wales (draw, retain title)	2–2	NSW 13–0	NSW 42–9	QLD 14–10	Draw 25–25	QLD 22–20
1935	New South Wales	4–1	NSW 33–16	NSW 18–14	NSW 51–8	QLD 22–20	NSW 23–9
1936	New South Wales	3–0	NSW 30–13	NSW 24–13	NSW 16–14		
1937	New South Wales	3–0	NSW 21–9	NSW 31–3	NSW 16–11		
1938	New South Wales	2–1	NSW 20–19	NSW 44–7	QLD 36–22		
1939	New South Wales (draw, retain title)	2–2	NSW 50–15	NSW 54–13	QLD 29–13	QLD 23–13	
1940	Queensland	3–1	NSW 52–11	QLD 19–16	QLD 45–8	QLD 23–15	
1941	New South Wales	3–1	NSW 18–14	NSW 44–10	NSW 23–16	QLD 27–21	
1945	New South Wales	2–0	NSW 37–12	NSW 30–19			
1946	New South Wales	3–0	NSW 46–10	NSW 24–6	NSW 30–14		
1947	New South Wales	2–1	NSW 29–15	QLD 18–9	NSW 22–10	Draw 13–13	
1948	New South Wales	3–1	NSW 23–9	NSW 17–15	QLD 9–8	NSW 17–13	
1949	New South Wales	4–0	NSW 19–3	NSW 33–3	NSW 44–20	NSW 33–13	
1950	New South Wales	2–0	NSW 45–12	Draw 9–9	NSW 25–5		
1951	Queensland	2–1	QLD 29–18	NSW 31–8	QLD 39–23		
1952	New South Wales	3–0	NSW 18–17	NSW 27–10	NSW 38–17		
1953	New South Wales (draw, retain title)	2–2	NSW 26–15	NSW 27–16	QLD 32–23	QLD 22–13	
1954	New South Wales	4–0	NSW 26–23	NSW 18–13	NSW 46–7	NSW 26–21	
1955	New South Wales (draw, retain title)	2–2	NSW 17–15	QLD 30–28	NSW 25–18	QLD 34–12	
1956	New South Wales	3–1	NSW 28–26	QLD 28–20	NSW 26–18	NSW 23–19	
1957	New South Wales	4–0	NSW 49–11	NSW 29–12	NSW 69–5	NSW 45–12	
1958	New South Wales	3–0	NSW 25–14	NSW 29–20	NSW 23–15		
1959	Queensland	3–1	QLD 17–15	NSW 24–14	QLD 23–11	QLD 18–14	
1960	Queensland (draw, retain title)	2–2	NSW 22–21	QLD 17–12	QLD 13–0	NSW 33–14	
1961	Queensland (draw, retain title)	2–2	NSW 21–20	NSW 18–2	QLD 15–2	QLD 20–17	
1962	New South Wales	3–0	NSW 28–8	NSW 19–14	NSW 25–12	Draw 19–19	
1963	New South Wales	4–0	NSW 20–10	NSW 53–7	NSW 31–5	NSW 13–5	
1964	New South Wales	4–0	NSW 28–12	NSW 41–3	NSW 31–5	NSW 22–11	
1965	New South Wales	4–0	NSW 31–7	NSW 22–4	NSW 30–9	NSW 22–15	
1966	New South Wales	4–0	NSW 16–6	NSW 28–10	NSW 28–20	NSW 27–3	
1967	New South Wales	2–1	NSW 14–8	NSW 28–9	Draw 16–16	QLD 13–11	
1968	New South Wales	2–1	NSW 30–7	QLD 15–8	NSW 29–11		
1969	New South Wales	4–0	NSW 26–0	NSW 32–13	NSW 33–17	NSW 22–12	
1970	New South Wales	3–1	QLD 16–15	NSW 22–8	NSW 34–8	NSW 32–15	
1971	New South Wales	3–0	NSW 12–3	NSW 30–2	NSW 17–15		
1972	New South Wales	2–0	NSW 29–5	NSW 27–6			
1973	New South Wales	3–0	NSW 16–0	NSW 10–0	NSW 26–0		
1974	New South Wales	1–0	NSW 22–13	Draw 13–13	Draw 4–4		
1975	New South Wales	2–1	QLD 14–8	NSW 27–18	NSW 9–8		
1976	New South Wales	3–0	NSW 33–9	NSW 10–5	NSW 15–13		
1977	New South Wales	2–0	NSW 19–3	NSW 14–13			
1978	New South Wales	3–0	NSW 25–19	NSW 12–11	NSW 28–12		
1979	New South Wales	3–0	NSW 30–5	NSW 31–7	NSW 35–20		
1980	New South Wales	2–0	NSW 35–3	NSW 17–7	Origin game		
1981	New South Wales	2–0	NSW 10–2	NSW 22–9	Origin game		

== NSW interstate representatives (1908–1981) ==
Name	First Yr	Last Yr	Apps	Tries	Goals	FG	Pts
Don Adams	1955	1956	6	8			24
Bob Alexander	1950	1951	2				
Brian Allsop	1955	1955	1	1			3
Chris Anderson	1974	1981	6	2			6
Fred Anderson	1958	1961	3	1			3
Ted Anderson	1938	1938	1	1			3
Tommy Anderson	1908	1908	1	4			12
Ned Andrews	1948	1948	1				
Vic Armbruster	1922	1922	1				
Jim Armstrong	1946	1946	1				
Carl Arneman	1926	1926	4				
Ferris Ashton	1952	1952	3	2			6
Royce Ayliffe	1981	1981	1				
Arthur Baber	1913	1913	2	2			6
Harry Bailey	1933	1933	1				
Max Bailey	1928	1929	2				
Ron Bailey	1945	1946	3	2			6
Charlie Banks	1951	1951	2				
Gary Banks	1966	1966	4				
John Barber	1971	1971	1				
Keith Barnes	1956	1963	11	2	50		106
Jack Barnett	1910	1911	3				
Tom Barry	1925	1925	2				
Robert Bartlett	1953	1953	2				
Harry Bath	1946	1947	3	3			9
Ron Battye	1953	1953	1				
Barry Beath	1965	1967	2	1			3
Jack Beaton	1934	1937	12	13	2		43
Ray Beaven	1961	1961	2	2			6
Terry Beckett	1959	1959	2				
Arthur Beetson	1966	1977	17	3			9
Jim Bell	1926	1926	1				
William Bell	1929	1930	3				
Bob Bennett	1959	1959	1				
Eric Bennett	1945	1945	2				
Grantley Bennett	1931	1933	5	2			6
Bill Benson	1921	1924	5				
Tom Berecry	1911	1912	2	1			3
Len Bertoldo	1975	1975	1				
Billy Bischoff Jr.	1961	1961	1				
George Bishop	1929	1933	6		2		4
Harold Bissett	1913	1913	1	1			3
Alf Blair	1919	1927	7	4	2		16
Cec Blinkhorn	1922	1924	4	1			3
Johnny Bliss	1947	1951	6	9			27
Harry Bloomfield	1908	1908	1				
Ron Boden	1960	1960	3				
Herbert Bolt	1913	1913	2	2			6
Jack Bonnyman	1939	1939	2	1	1		5
Tom Bourke	1945	1945	1				
Kerry Boustead	1979	1981	6	3			9
Bob Bower	1949	1949	2				
Jack Bowman	1955	1955	1				
Les Boyd	1979	1981	4	1			3
Paul Boys	1919	1919	1				
Herb Brackenreg	1908	1908	1		2		4
Bill Bradstreet	1966	1967	3				
Alan Brady	1930	1935	5	3			9
Stan Brain	1925	1928	6	4			12
Ray Branighan	1970	1974	5		5		10
Tony Branson	1967	1971	7	1			3
John Brass	1970	1970	2	2			6
Greg Brentnall	1980	1981	2	1			3
Jerry Brien	1925	1928	3				
Harry Brighton	1912	1912	1				
William Brogan	1929	1932	11	2			6
Albert Broomham	1908	1912	6	9			27
David Brown	1962	1962	1	1			3
David M. Brown	1931	1936	19	9	49		125
Fred Brown	1955	1955	1				
Kel Brown	1970	1970	1				
Kevin Brown	1957	1958	2				
Os Brown	1911	1911	1				
Ray Brown	1979	1979	1	1			3
Tony Brown	1958	1962	9	2			6
Fred Buchanan	1932	1932	2				
John Bucknall	1973	1973	1				
Bob Bugden	1960	1964	2				
Les Bull	1926	1926	1				
Roy Bull	1949	1956	18				
Allan Buman	1965	1968	9	1			3
Edward Burdett	1911	1911	1				
Albert Burge	1911	1911	1				
Frank Burge	1912	1926	6	7	5		31
Brian Burke	1970	1971	2	2	1		8
Peter Burke	1959	1960	4				
Eddie Burns	1948	1948	2				
Joe Busch	1928	1930	7	2			6
Arthur Butler	1908	1911	2	1			3
Harry Butler	1913	1913	2				
Neville Butler	1938	1938	1		1		2
John Campbell	1911	1912	2	1	1		5
Keith Campbell	1971	1971	1		5		10
Billy Cann	1908	1912	6	8	9		42
John Cann	1960	1960	4	2			6
Harry Caples	1919	1923	4	1			3
Brian Carlson	1952	1959	10	8	12		48
Bill Carson	1962	1962	2				
Harry Cavanough	1926	1928	12				
George Challis	1915	1915	2				
Darrel Chapman	1959	1959	1	1			3
John Chapman	1972	1972	2	2			6
Neville Charlton	1959	1961	2				
Frank Cheadle	1908	1908	1				
Clive Churchill	1948	1957	27	4	15	3	48
Brian Clay	1957	1959	7	3			9
Noel Cleal	1981	1981	1				
Michael Cleary	1962	1969	10	13			39
Gordon Clifford	1957	1957	1		9		18
Ron Clothier	1964	1964	1	1			3
Arthur Clues	1945	1946	5				
Gary Collins	1967	1967	1				
Arthur Collinson	1953	1953	3	2			6
Paddy Conaghan	1920	1920	1				
Albert Conlon	1908	1908	1				
William Conlon	1937	1937	1		2		4
Lionel Cooper	1945	1946	4	6			18
Ron Coote	1965	1975	13	6			18
John Cootes	1969	1970	5	4	1		14
Ray Corcoran	1970	1970	1	1			3
Charlie Cornwell	1930	1934	2				
Larry Corowa	1978	1979	5	5			15
Ron Costello	1967	1971	8	1			3
Frank Cottle	1947	1947	3				
Tedda Courtney	1908	1915	8	2			6
John Coveney	1979	1979	1				
Les Cowie	1948	1954	10	1			3
Jim Craig	1929	1929	2		3		6
Bob Craig	1910	1911	2				
Arch Crippin	1936	1936	1	2			6
Harold Crocker	1954	1955	3				
Michael Cronin	1973	1981	19	5	67		149
Ron Crowe	1960	1966	14	1			3
Denis Cubis	1965	1965	1	1			3
Les Cubitt	1911	1919	4	6			18
Frank Curran	1933	1936	14	3			9
Allan Dagwell	1975	1975	2				
Gordon Daisley	1925	1925	2				
Kevin Dann	1980	1980	1		1		2
Jim Davis	1911	1911	1	1			3
Jack Dawson	1924	1924	2				
Ken Dawson	1962	1962	1				
Len Dawson	1938	1938	1	1			3
Ted Dawson	1949	1949	1				
Fred de Belin	1948	1950	10	4			12
Colin De Lore	1952	1952	2				
Sid Deane	1908	1908	1	1			3
Bill Delamere	1959	1960	3				
Hilton Delaney	1933	1933	1				
Merv Denton	1939	1941	12	12	1		38
Pat Devery	1946	1947	6	4	3		18
Fred Dhu	1938	1938	2	3			9
Len Diett	1964	1964	1				
Bobby Dimond	1948	1948	3	1			3
Peter Dimond	1958	1963	4	5			15
Peter Diversi	1952	1956	9		2		4
Eric Doig	1925	1925	1				
John Donnelly	1973	1976	4				
Denis Donoghue	1950	1954	5	1			3
Col Donohoe	1954	1956	3	1			3
John Dorahy	1979	1979	2		6		12
Johnny Dougherty	1954	1956	6	3			9
Garry Dowling	1975	1981	3	2			6
Lindsay Drake	1971	1971	1	1			3
Rees Duncan Jr.	1952	1953	4	2			6
Rees Duncan Sr.	1931	1932	6	1			3
Jim Dunworth	1924	1924	1				
Graham Eadie	1974	1980	12	3	8		25
Trevor Eather	1946	1946	1	1			3
Bill Edwards	1948	1948	1				
Ernie Edwards	1929	1929	1				
John Elford	1972	1972	1				
Keith Ellis	1926	1926	5	2			6
Tom Ellis	1928	1928	1				
Jim Evans	1954	1954	3				
Clive Evatt	1922	1924	5				
Don Evenden	1954	1957	2				
Vince Everingham	1962	1962	1				
Laurie Fagan	1962	1962	1				
Terry Fahey	1976	1978	5	3			9
Percy Fairall	1935	1936	6	2			6
Russell Fairfax	1974	1975	2				
Reg Farnell	1919	1919	1				
Bill Farnsworth	1910	1911	5	2			6
Viv Farnsworth	1910	1910	3	1			3
Frank Farrell	1939	1950	14	1			3
Alf Faull	1919	1919	1				
Terry Fearnley	1960	1960	1				
Fred Felsch	1938	1941	10	6	10		38
Cec Fifield	1925	1929	5		1		2
Harry Finch	1926	1929	9	1			3
Robert Firth	1940	1941	2				
Denis Fitzgerald	1971	1977	5	1			3
Allan Fitzgibbon	1968	1968	1				
Jim Flattery	1921	1922	3	6			18
Gordon Fletcher	1928	1928	1				
Arthur Folwell	1932	1934	6				
Ike Fowler	1959	1959	1				
Alf Fraser	1919	1923	3				
Charles Fraser	1915	1921	5	2	4		14
Dan Frawley	1911	1912	2	4			12
Eric Freestone	1928	1928	2	2	1		8
Keith Froome	1941	1949	7	2			6
Ed Fry	1908	1908	1				
Bob Fulton	1967	1978	15	14			42
Martin Gallagher	1954	1954	2	1			3
Fred Gardner	1933	1934	4	3			9
Russel Gartner	1977	1977	1				
Reg Gasnier	1959	1967	14	13	3		45
Col Geelan	1952	1954	3	1			3
Alf Gibbs	1946	1947	6	2			6
Jim Gibbs	1931	1938	25	6			18
Jack Gibson	1954	1954	1				
Herb Gilbert	1940	1946	5	1			3
Herb Gilbert	1911	1919	3	1			3
Charlie Gill	1951	1953	7				
Bill Gillespie	1921	1921	1	1			3
Harry Glanville	1908	1908	1				
Neville Glover	1978	1978	1				
Ned Goddard	1926	1926	4	2			6
Bede Goff	1959	1960	2				
Sid Goodwin	1938	1940	6	8			24
Ted Goodwin	1972	1976	8	1	4		11
Robin Gourley	1962	1962	2				
Brian Graham	1959	1959	2				
Bob Grant	1971	1971	1	1			3
Johnny Graves	1947	1952	10	9	22		71
Robert Graves	1908	1908	1				
Bert Gray	1913	1920	7	3			9
Johnny Greaves	1966	1968	6	5			15
Dick Green	1908	1908	1				
Les Griffin	1930	1931	5	4			12
David Grimmond	1970	1970	3	2			6
David Grundie	1911	1912	2	1			3
Don Gulliver	1939	1939	2				
Adrian Haertsch	1969	1969	2				
Bob Hagan	1967	1967	1				
Steve Hage	1978	1978	1				
Abe Hall	1932	1932	1		2		4
Howard Hallett	1911	1912	2	2			6
Arthur Halloway	1910	1919	8	3			9
Brian Hambly	1959	1963	7	2			6
Bill Hamilton	1971	1973	4	1			3
Ernie Hammerton	1951	1956	6				
Les Hampson	1956	1956	1				
Jack Hampstead	1945	1946	4	3			9
Nevyl Hand	1947	1948	2				
Les Hanigan	1967	1967	3	2			6
Edmund Hanrahan	1921	1921	1	1			3
Kevin Hansen	1949	1955	4	2			6
Lancelot Hansen	1908	1908	1	1		1	5
Bill Hardman	1925	1926	6	3			9
Nelson Hardy	1926	1930	15	2	10		26
Barry Harris	1959	1962	4				
Keith Harris	1975	1975	2	1			3
Mark Harris	1970	1978	10	9			27
Sid Harris	1926	1932	2				
Earl Harrison	1963	1965	4	2			6
Rex Harrison	1938	1941	10	6	4		26
Gordon Hart	1940	1940	1				
John Harvey	1981	1981	1				
Roy Hasson	1947	1947	1		1		2
Greg Hawick	1953	1958	8	3	22		53
Johnny Hawke	1948	1951	6	1			3
Geoff Hawkey	1957	1958	2	1			3
Frank Hawthorne	1928	1928	1				
Phil Hawthorne	1970	1970	2				
John Hayes	1961	1961	1				
Les Hayes	1924	1925	2				
Charlie Hazelton	1937	1937	2	2			6
Charlie Hedley	1908	1908	1				
Arthur Hennessy	1908	1908	1				
Darcy Henry	1955	1956	5	4		1	14
Os Herden	1934	1937	5	2			6
Steve Hewson	1975	1975	2	2			6
Vic Hey	1933	1935	12	8			24
Ray Higgs	1975	1977	7				
Ron Hilditch	1981	1981	1				
Eddie Hilliard	1913	1913	2	1			3
Clarrie Hincksman	1924	1924	1				
Ray Hines	1935	1935	4	6			18
Dallas Hodgins	1921	1922	3	1			3
Eric Hogan	1926	1926	1				
Neville Hogan	1947	1947	1				
Jack Holland	1949	1951	5	1			3
Henry Holloway	1955	1955	3				
Keith Holman	1950	1958	24	20	1		62
Jack Holmes	1929	1930	3	2			6
Len Holmes	1947	1947	4	1	3		9
Bob Honan	1969	1969	3				
Bob Honeysett	1956	1962	4	1			3
Billy Hong	1931	1931	2				
Bruce Hopkins	1948	1948	2		8		16
Bill Horder	1949	1949	3	2			6
Clarrie Horder	1919	1919	2	3	4		17
Harold Horder	1915	1924	9	23	18		105
Peter Howlett	1973	1973	2				
Lloyd Hudson	1953	1953	2				
Don Hughes	1928	1928	1		2		4
Graeme Hughes	1975	1975	1				
Gwynne Hughes	1925	1929	3	1			3
Fred Hume	1921	1921	1	1			3
George Hunter	1954	1954	1	1			3
Frank Hurley	1936	1936	2				
Les Hutchings	1970	1970	2				
Jack Hutchinson	1946	1946	1	1			3
Frank Hyde	1938	1939	5	3			9
Ken Irvine	1959	1967	25	29	4		95
Roger Irving	1974	1974	1				
Bill Ives	1924	1925	4	1			3
Clarrie Ives	1920	1924	4	1			3
Norm Jacobson	1945	1945	1	1			3
Brian James	1968	1968	2				
Dick Jeffery	1971	1971	3				
William Joass	1911	1919	4	1			3
Les Johns	1962	1969	15	3	74	3	163
Dick Johnson	1938	1945	11	1			3
Frank Johnson	1947	1950	5				
Jimmy Johnson	1925	1925	1				
Lin Johnson	1940	1940	2				
Albert Johnston	1920	1923	3	2			6
Brian Johnston	1981	1981	1				
Ian Johnston	1949	1949	3	2			6
Fred Jones	1968	1973	4	2			6
Johnny Jones	1960	1961	3	1	11		25
Lou Jones	1908	1908	2				
Peter Jones	1965	1965	1	1			3
Joe Jorgenson	1941	1946	9	4	31		74
Kevin Junee	1965	1968	7	3			9
Arthur Justice	1925	1929	18				
Harry Kadwell	1928	1932	8	2	12		30
Sid Kaufman	1919	1919	1				
Ken Kearney	1953	1958	17	2			6
Aub Kelly	1926	1927	9	2			6
Bill Kelly	1915	1915	2				
John Kelly	1961	1961	3	1			3
Noel Kelly	1963	1967	5	1			3
Clem Kennedy	1945	1947	4	2			6
John Kerwick	1919	1919	1				
Bob Keyes	1964	1964	1				
Paul Khan	1978	1978	1				
Des Kimmorley	1971	1971	2				
Johnny King	1963	1970	11	11	5		43
Fred Kinghorn	1913	1913	2				
Jack Kingston	1928	1934	12	3			9
Tom Kirk	1939	1946	4	3	4		17
Roy Kirkaldy	1938	1941	11	3			9
Ross Kite	1954	1958	8	14			42
Jack Knight	1921	1921	1				
Max Krilich	1978	1978	2	1			3
Bob Landers	1959	1959	1				
Alby Lane	1925	1928	8	1			3
John Lang	1980	1980	1				
Graeme Langlands	1962	1975	33	19	40		137
Ernie Lapham	1926	1928	8	3	2		13
Reg Latta	1921	1925	11				
Jack Laurence	1925	1925	1	1			3
Robert Laurie	1981	1981	1				
Steve Lavers	1976	1976	1				
Vic Lawrence	1927	1927	3				
Tom Leamy	1925	1925	2				
Harold Leddy	1921	1923	2				
Charlie Lees	1913	1913	1				
Merv Lees	1954	1955	3	2			6
Tom Leggo	1913	1913	2	1	1		5
Garry Leo	1967	1967	1	1			3
Jack Leveson	1908	1908	1				
Eric Lewis	1935	1937	6	1			3
Bob Lindfield	1928	1928	1				
Bill Lindsay	1912	1912	1	1			3
Tom Linskey	1923	1923	1				
Jimmy Lisle	1962	1965	8	1			3
Sel Lisle	1946	1946	1				
Jimmy Love	1925	1925	1				
Bob Lulham	1947	1949	9	8			24
Eddie Lumsden	1957	1963	16	14	7		56
Graham Lye	1969	1969	1	2			6
Ron Lynch	1960	1967	15	2			6
Albert McAndrew	1940	1940	2	1			3
Arthur McCabe	1910	1910	2	4			12
Paul McCabe	1981	1981	2	2			6
Tom McCabe	1908	1908	1	2			6
Bill McCarthy	1908	1908	1				
Bob McCarthy	1969	1975	10	7			21
Jack McCormack	1931	1931	3		1		2
Matt McCoy	1949	1951	5	2	15		36
Patrick McCue	1911	1912	2	3			9
John McDonald	1969	1970	3		1		2
Barney McEvoy	1960	1960	2				
Selby McFarlane	1913	1913	2	1			3
Ted McGrath	1922	1922	1				
Dugald McGregor	1912	1912	1		3		6
Albert McGuinness	1941	1941	3		6		12
Ted McGuinness	1910	1910	2	2	1		8
Ross McKinnon	1933	1937	7		2		4
Chris McKivat	1910	1912	5	2			6
Gordon McLennan	1937	1937	1	1			3
Allan McMahon	1975	1977	6	5			15
Jack McMahon	1925	1925	1				
John McMartin	1975	1975	1				
Frank McMillan	1922	1934	20		1	1	4
Charles McMurtrie	1911	1911	1	2			6
Doug McRitchie	1948	1950	4				
Gil MacDougall	1963	1963	3	2			6
Allan Maddalena	1966	1966	2	1			3
Ken Maddison	1974	1974	1				
Pat Maher	1928	1929	7	2			6
Bill Maizey	1926	1926	3				
Stanley Maker	1925	1925	2				
Ron Mann	1948	1948	2				
Don Manson	1938	1938	1				
Les Mara	1975	1976	2				
Bill Marsh	1955	1958	8	3			9
Steve Martin	1978	1980	1	1			3
Jeff Masterman	1981	1981	2				
Frank Matterson	1929	1929	1				
Col Maxwell	1948	1948	1				
Les Mead	1933	1935	3		4		8
Dally Messenger	1908	1912	6	10	42	1	116
Wally Messenger	1913	1913	1				
Keith Middleton	1950	1951	2	1			3
Dud Millard	1924	1924	1				
Angus Miller	1947	1948	3				
Ian Moir	1952	1959	10	10			30
Peter Moir	1908	1908	1	1			3
Arch Moncreiff	1913	1913	2				
Brian Moore	1963	1970	4	2			6
Grahame Moran	1970	1970	1	1			3
Laurie Moraschi	1965	1965	1	1			3
Jim Morgan	1965	1974	7				
John Morgan	1965	1970	5	1	1		5
Ray Morris	1931	1933	7	3			9
Rod Morris	1979	1981	4				
Steve Morris	1978	1980	2	1			3
Steve Mortimer	1977	1981	4				
Andy Morton	1908	1908	1				
Rex Mossop	1957	1960	6				
Mick Mullane	1950	1950	1				
Noel Mulligan	1947	1951	10	4			12
Bill Mullins	1971	1971	1	1			3
Frank Mulville	1940	1940	2				
Pat Murphy	1925	1925	3	1			3
Wal Murphy	1925	1925	1				
Joe Murray	1912	1912	1				
Herb Narvo	1938	1945	11	9			27
Henry Naylor	1911	1911	1				
William Neill	1910	1911	4				
Barry Nelson	1959	1959	1				
Fred Nelson	1959	1959	1				
Edgar Newham	1941	1941	4	3			9
Bill Noble	1910	1913	6	1			3
Fred Nolan	1937	1937	3				
Ernie Norman	1931	1937	13	3			9
Ray Norman	1912	1919	5	3	6		21
Rex Norman	1921	1921	1	1	4		11
Andy Norval	1938	1941	5	3			9
Kevin O'Brien	1956	1956	2	2			6
Wally O'Connell	1948	1952	5	1			3
Alf O'Connor	1924	1930	9	1			3
Frank O'Connor	1931	1934	9	1			3
Peter O'Connor	1956	1956	2				
Owen O'Donnell	1970	1970	1				
Charlie Ogle	1919	1919	1				
Bruce Olive	1958	1962	8	2			6
Graham Olling	1977	1978	3	1			3
Larry O'Malley	1908	1912	2				
John O'Neill	1967	1971	5				
Bob O'Reilly	1970	1974	8				
Des O'Reilly	1981	1981	1				
Frank O'Rourke	1925	1927	8	2	3		12
Bryan Orrock	1955	1956	4				
Kel O'Shea	1956	1958	7				
Bill Owen	1961	1962	4				
Harry Owen	1927	1931	8		10		20
Arthur Oxford	1919	1924	7	1	18		39
Walter Palmer	1915	1915	2				
Terry Pannowitz	1965	1965	1				
Don Parish	1959	1961	5	3	8		25
Dave Parkinson	1946	1946	1	1			3
Jim Parsons	1927	1927	2	1			3
Don Pascoe	1968	1969	3	3			9
Tony Paskins	1961	1962	3		13		26
Mark Patch	1957	1959	3				
Albert Paul	1952	1953	4	2			6
Cliff Pearce	1928	1936	17	2	3		12
Joe Pearce	1930	1941	31	8	10		44
Sandy Pearce	1910	1920	6	1			3
John Peard	1976	1977	4		1		2
George Peponis	1976	1980	8	3			9
Herman Peters	1923	1923	1				
Gary Pethybridge	1973	1973	1				
Tim Pickup	1972	1975	5				
Noel Pidding	1947	1954	20	17	59		169
Greg Pierce	1976	1978	5	1			3
Harry Pierce	1938	1939	2				
George Piggins	1974	1976	2				
Tom Pitman	1947	1947	1				
Denis Pittard	1969	1972	5	4			12
Dick Poole	1954	1957	10	7			21
Norm Pope	1931	1931	1				
Henry Porter	1935	1941	14	1			3
Monty Porter	1960	1960	1				
George Potter	1919	1919	2	1			3
Ron Potter	1956	1956	2				
Clarrie Prentice	1919	1921	3	2			6
Ray Price	1978	1981	7	6			18
Wally Prigg	1929	1939	34	13			39
Perce Pritchard	1947	1950	3	3			9
Norm Provan	1954	1961	20	4			12
Gordon Pugh	1934	1934	2				
Bernie Purcell	1951	1956	4	1	3		9
Jim Pye	1919	1921	4	1			3
John Quayle	1973	1973	2	1			3
Jim Quealey	1940	1940	1				
Alan Quinlivan	1940	1940	3				
Oscar Quinlivan	1922	1924	2				
Graham Quinn	1980	1980	1				
Norman Quinn	1928	1928	2				
Paul Quinn	1963	1965	9	1			3
Terry Randall	1973	1978	11				
Johnny Raper	1959	1970	24	5			15
Elton Rasmussen	1962	1968	6				
Tommy Raudonikis	1970	1980	18	9			27
Billy Rayner	1960	1960	2				
Jack Rayner	1947	1954	12	4			12
Jack Reardon	1934	1934	1				
Rod Reddy	1973	1980	9	3			9
Terry Reynolds	1970	1970	1				
Johnny Rhodes	1968	1968	2				
John Ribot	1978	1981	2	2			6
Charlie Richards	1936	1936	1				
Alan Ridley	1929	1936	18	25	1		77
Alan Righton	1927	1927	1			1	2
Ed Rigney	1919	1921	2			1	2
Johnny Riley	1959	1959	1				
Ray Ritchie	1957	1957	2	3			9
Ron Roberts	1949	1949	4	8			24
George Robinson	1919	1919	1				
Jack Robinson	1919	1923	5	4			12
Norm Robinson	1925	1926	5	1			3
Steve Rogers	1973	1981	14	7	6		33
Edward Root	1927	1932	14	3			9
Dick Roser	1937	1937	1	1			3
Cec Rubie	1931	1931	1				
George Ruebner	1968	1968	2				
Frank Rule	1923	1925	6	1			3
Barry Rushworth	1963	1964	2	3			9
Charlie Russell	1911	1913	2	2			6
Jim Rutherford	1933	1933	1				
Bill Ryan	1932	1932	1				
Felix Ryan	1915	1923	7	1			3
Kevin Ryan	1962	1966	7	1			3
Trevor Ryan	1978	1978	1				
Ron Saddler	1967	1968	6	2	5		16
Paul Sait	1969	1974	5	2			6
John Sattler	1969	1969	4				
Frank Saunders	1924	1925	2				
Don Schofield	1953	1958	7	2			6
Ian Schubert	1978	1978	1				
Kevin Schubert	1948	1954	12				
Bill Schultz	1919	1923	5				
Jim Scoular	1948	1948	1				
Terry Scurfield	1971	1971	1	1			3
Dudley Seddon	1921	1924	2	1			3
Bill Shankland	1928	1930	5	3			9
Arthur Shawcross	1939	1939	1				
Vince Sheehan	1919	1919	1	2			6
Ken Sherwood	1931	1931	2	1			3
Mick Shields	1935	1935	2	1			3
Bill Shippen	1940	1940	2				
Phil Sigsworth	1981	1981	1				
Eric Simms	1968	1968	1		6	1	14
Jack Sinclair	1961	1961	2				
Billy Smith	1964	1973	15	1	1		5
Bob Smith	1960	1962	5				
George Smith	1962	1962	4				
Len Smith	1947	1948	7	6			18
Neville Smith	1940	1941	6	6	9		36
Robert Smith	1947	1947	1	1			3
Bill Spence	1910	1912	2	2			6
Jack Spencer	1945	1945	2	1			3
John Spencer	1969	1969	1				
Frank Sponberg	1933	1934	3	1			3
Frank Stanmore	1948	1952	8	1			3
Frank Stanton	1963	1963	2	1	2		7
Geoff Starling	1971	1972	3	1			3
Les Steel	1922	1922	1				
Alan Steele	1924	1924	1				
Ray Stehr	1931	1941	30	2			6
Barry Stenhouse	1953	1953	1	1			3
Ken Stephen	1948	1948	1				
Gordon Stettler	1925	1925	1		3		6
Gary Stevens	1972	1975	4				
Athol Stewart	1938	1940	7	7			21
Don Stewart	1932	1932	1	1			3
Robert Stone	1980	1980	1				
Ken Stonestreet	1969	1969	1	1			3
Johnno Stuntz	1911	1911	1	1			3
Bob Sullivan	1954	1954	2	2			6
Con Sullivan	1910	1912	6	3			9
Gary Sullivan	1972	1973	3	1			3
Arthur Summons	1961	1963	5				
Ted Swinson	1911	1911	1				
Ted Taplin	1919	1919	1				
Ron Taylor	1958	1958	1				
Alec Tennant	1966	1966	2				
Viv Thicknesse	1933	1936	11	3			9
Ray Thomas	1951	1955	2				
Alan Thompson	1979	1980	4	2			6
Duncan Thompson	1922	1922	1				
Harold Thompson	1912	1915	3	2			6
Ken Thompson	1970	1970	1				
Roy Thompson	1938	1940	9	3	34		77
Allan Thomson	1966	1968	6				
Ian Thomson	1978	1978	3	1			3
Dick Thornett	1963	1969	11	7			21
Ken Thornett	1963	1964	2				
Jack Toohey	1923	1926	3	3	6		21
Fred Tottey	1937	1937	3	3			9
Dick Townsend	1920	1920	1				
Eddie Tracey	1948	1948	1				
George Treweek	1927	1933	18	9			27
Jack Troy	1950	1950	3	4			12
Tony Trudgett	1980	1980	1				
Mick Trypas	1971	1971	1				
Cedric Turvey	1941	1941	1				
Clarrie Tye	1919	1921	2				
Bill Tyquin	1941	1941	1				
Tom Tyrrell	1951	1952	2	1			3
Mick Veivers	1965	1967	5	1			3
Dick Vest	1919	1920	3	3			9
David Waite	1973	1974	4				
Laurie Wakefield	1970	1970	1		3		6
Bruce Walker	1975	1975	1				
John Walker	1966	1967	3				
Lyall Wall	1919	1919	2	1			3
Ian Walsh	1959	1966	17	1			3
Jack Walsh	1947	1947	2				
Elwyn Walters	1969	1974	11	2			6
Dennis Ward	1969	1973	5	1		1	5
Laurie Ward	1933	1937	11				
Ross Warner	1964	1965	4	1			3
Henry Waterhouse	1924	1925	4				
Jack Watkins	1915	1924	8	2			6
David Watson	1929	1929	2				
George Watt	1945	1947	6	5			15
Horrie Watt	1919	1924	4				
Benny Wearing	1924	1928	13	10	23		76
Jack Wedgwood	1940	1946	3				
Bob Weir	1965	1966	3	1	1		5
Eric Weissel	1929	1932	5		6		12
Harry Wells	1952	1961	27	6			18
Eddie White	1912	1912	1	4			12
Noel White	1945	1946	5	4			12
Bobby Whitton	1954	1959	5				
Alby Why	1924	1924	1				
Jack Why	1930	1933	5	1			3
Ron Willey	1956	1956	2		12		24
Bob Williams	1911	1911	1				
George Williams	1932	1932	1				
Percy Williams	1932	1937	8		10		20
Lionel Williamson	1971	1974	3	1			3
Gordon Willoughby	1951	1954	4	3			9
Billy Wilson	1961	1963	3				
Dick Wilson	1963	1963	1				
Graham Wilson	1961	1966	5	2			6
John Wittenberg	1968	1970	5				
Mark Wright	1975	1975	1				
William Wylie	1946	1946	1				
Graeme Wynn	1980	1980	2	1	3		9
Peter Wynn	1979	1979	2	1			3
Nick Yakich	1965	1965	3	4			12
Colin York	1928	1930	6				
Craig Young	1979	1981	5				

== State of Origin (1980-present) ==
=== Conception of State of Origin football ===
By the 1970s the prestige of interstate matches had been seriously downgraded, in most part due to the fact that a number of Queensland players signed to NSW clubs could not unseat the NSW incumbent and also were not eligible for Queensland selection, so they did not play at all. Matches were played mid-week, so as not to interfere with the Sydney club competition, and the small crowds in New South Wales were hosted at suburban grounds. Interstate football reached its nadir in 1977 when the New South Wales Rugby Football League (NSWRFL) declined to host the Queensland team, and both interstate games were played in Queensland.

Former Queensland captain and Australian vice-captain Jack Reardon, who had later become a journalist, was the first to suggest that Sydney-based Queenslanders should be available for selection to represent their state.

Brisbane Courier-Mail reporter Hugh Lunn, Barry Maranta (the future co-founder of the Brisbane Broncos) and Maranta's business partner Wayne Reid played a part in persuading QRL chairman Ron McAullife that the concept could be used in rugby league. Lunn told McAullife that "you can take the Queenslander out of Queensland, Ron, but you can't take the Queensland out of the Queenslander." McAuliffe was initially skeptical. "What if we recall our boys from Sydney to play, and we are beaten. Where would we go from there?" Reid spoke to NSWRFL president Kevin Humphreys and suggested that a one-off state of origin match could be used as a Test Match selection trial.

New South Wales clubs were reticent in their support of the concept and set two conditions:

- If the third game was to decide the series it was not to act as a selection trial, and also,
- that the expatriate Queenslanders would be under the supervision of a representative of the NSWRFL whose duty it would be to protect the interests of both the NSWRFL and the clubs to which they were contracted. (From 1980 this role was filled by Bob Abbott, a Cronulla-Sutherland Sharks official.)

Three Sydney clubs remained opposed to the plan: St. George Dragons, South Sydney Rabbitohs and Eastern Suburbs Roosters. As these clubs were refusing to release players, Humphreys threatened to make the game an official Australian Rugby League trial, which would make release mandatory. The clubs backed down.

== Overall Results ==
Including the Interstate Series and State of Origin results, NSW has won 71 titles, and Queensland has won 38 titles. The all-time record of games played is 353 with New South Wales having 219 wins, Queensland 124 wins, and 10 matches have been drawn.

State	Interstate Series (1908–1981) (Note: includes 1980, 1981 and 1987 exhibition game results in Win-Loss-Draw columns even though they were not part of any series)				State of Origin (1982–present) (Note: As of 2025)				Total			
State	Won	Lost	Drawn	Titles	Won	Lost	Drawn	Titles	Won	Lost	Drawn	Titles
(New South Wales) NSW	159	54	8	54	60	70	2	17	219	124	10	71
Queensland	54	159	8	13	70	60	2	25	124	219	10	38
