= 1919 Kangaroo tour of New Zealand =

1919 rugby league tour

The 1919 Kangaroo Tour of New Zealand was the first full tour of New Zealand by the Australia national rugby league team and the Australian's first tour since the end of World War 1. The Australians played nine matches on tour, including a four test series against the New Zealand national rugby league team. The tour began on 23 August and finished on 4 October.

== Leadership ==
The tour captain of the 24 man squad to New Zealand was Balmain halfback Arthur "Pony" Halloway.

== Touring squad ==
* Tests and (as sub) included in games total.

Player	Club	Position(s)	Games (as sub)	Tests (as sub)	Tries	Goals	F/Goals	Points
Frank Burge	Glebe	Prop, Second-row, Lock	7	4	10	17	0	64
Les Cubitt	Eastern Suburbs	Centre, Wing	8	4	23	0	0	69
Charles Fraser	Balmain	Fullback, Five-eighth	5	2	4	7	0	26
Herb Gilbert	Western Suburbs	Centre	5 (2)	2	5	0	0	15
Arthur Halloway (c)	Balmain	Halfback	8	3	2	3	0	12
Harold Horder	South Sydney	Wing	6	4	12	8	0	52
Albert Johnston	Newtown	Five-eighth	4	4	2	0	0	6
John Kerwick	South Sydney	Prop, Second-row	3	–	1	0	0	3
Reg Latta	Balmain	Lock, Second-row	3	–	0	0	0	0
Ray Norman	Eastern Suburbs	Centre, Wing	6	1	7	8	0	37
Claud O'Donnell	Souths Brisbane (QLD)	Second-row, Hooker	6	2	0	0	0	0
Arthur Oxford	South Sydney	Hooker, Prop, Second-row	6	3	0	18	0	36
Bill Paten	Ipswich (QLD)	Centre, Wing	5	1	1	0	0	3
Norm Potter	Wests Brisbane (QLD)	Second-row	1	–	0	1	0	2
Clarrie Prentice	Western Suburbs	Loose forward, Hooker	6	2	2	2	0	10
Jack Robinson	Balmain	Wing, Centre	5	2	12	0	0	36
Felix Ryan	Newtown	Second-row, Prop	6	3	4	0	0	12
Bill Schultz	Balmain	Lock, Prop	6	3	1	0	0	3
Tom Sweeney	Gympie (QLD)	Fullback	6	2	1	1	0	5
Duncan Thompson	Ipswich (QLD)	Halfback	2	1 (1)	0	0	0	0
Clarrie Thorogood	Queensland	Centre, Wing	4	1 (1)	1	0	0	3
Dick Townsend	Newtown	Hooker, Second-row, Prop	4	2	0	0	0	0
Dick Vest	Western Suburbs	Wing, Centre	5	1	11	0	0	33
Jack Watkins	Eastern Suburbs	Prop, Second-row, Lock	5	4	1	0	0	3

== Tour ==
=== First test ===
23 August 1919

New Zealand	21 – 44	Australia
Tries: Karl Ifwersen (2); Jack Lang; Goals: Craddock Dufty (5); Field Goals: Craddock Dufty (1)		Tries: Les Cubitt (2); Harold Horder (2); Frank Burge; Herb Gilbert; Albert Johnston; Jack Robinson; Felix Ryan; Jack Watkins; Goals: Arthur Oxford (6); Frank Burge (1)

Basin Reserve, Wellington
Attendance: 8,000
Referee: Albert House

New Zealand	Position	Australia
Craddock Dufty	FB	Tom Sweeney
George Iles	WG	Harold Horder
Karl Ifwersen (c)	CE	Herb Gilbert
George Bradley	CE	Les Cubitt
Alec Morris	WG	Jack Robinson
Jack Lang	FE	Albert Johnston
George Neal	HB	Arthur Halloway (c)
William Scott	PR	Jack Watkins
Bill King	HK	Arthur Oxford
Bert Avery	PR	Frank Burge
Bill Williams	SR	Felix Ryan
Sam Lowrie	SR	Claud O'Donnell
Stan Walters	LF	Clarrie Prentice
	Coach

=== Second test ===
30 August 1919

New Zealand	26 – 10	Australia
Tries: Stan Walters (3); Bert Avery; George Iles; Bill Williams; Goals: Karl Ifwersen (3); Craddock Dufty (1)		Tries: Harold Horder (2); Goals: Harold Horder (2)

Sydenham Park, Christchurch
Attendance: 7,200
Referee: Arthur Brunsden

New Zealand	Position	Australia
Craddock Dufty	FB	Tom Sweeney
George Iles	WG	Harold Horder
Karl Ifwersen (c)	CE	Les Cubitt
George Bradley	CE	Herb Gilbert
Jim Sanders	WG	Bill Paten
Alec Morris	FE	Albert Johnston
Mike Pollock	HB	Arthur Halloway (c)
William Scott	PR	Jack Watkins
Bert Avery	HK	Arthur Oxford
Stan Walters	PR	Frank Burge
Bill Williams	SR	Felix Ryan
Sam Lowrie	SR	Claud O'Donnell
Keith Helander	LF	Clarrie Prentice
	Int.	Clarrie Thorogood
	Coach

=== Third test ===
6 September 1919

New Zealand	23 – 34	Australia
Tries: Dougie McGregor (2); Bert Avery; Craddock Dufty; Stan Walters; Goals: Karl Ifwersen (3); George Bradley (1)		Tries: Les Cubitt (2); Harold Horder (2); Jack Robinson (2); Frank Burge; Albert Johnston; Goals: Harold Horder (5)

The Domain, Auckland
Attendance: 24,300
Referee: Bill Murray

New Zealand	Position	Australia
Craddock Dufty	FB	Charles Fraser
George Iles	WG	Harold Horder
Karl Ifwersen (c)	CE	Les Cubitt
Bill Davidson	CE	Clarrie Thorogood
Dougie McGregor	WG	Jack Robinson
George Bradley	FE	Albert Johnston
William Walsh	HB	Arthur Halloway (c)
William Scott	PR	Jack Watkins
Bert Avery	HK	Dick Townsend
Stan Walters	PR	Frank Burge
Bill Williams	SR	Felix Ryan
Sam Lowrie	SR	Claud O'Donnell
Tom Haddon	LF	Bill Schultz
	Int.	Duncan Thompson
	Coach

=== Fourth test ===
13 September 1919

New Zealand	2 – 32	Australia
Tries: Goals: Karl Ifwersen (1)		Tries: Harold Horder (3); Frank Burge (2); Dick Vest (2); Les Cubitt; Goals: Frank Burge (3); Harold Horder (1)

The Domain, Auckland
Attendance: 15,000
Referee: Archie Ferguson

New Zealand	Position	Australia
Craddock Dufty	FB	Charles Fraser
Dougie McGregor	WG	Harold Horder
Karl Ifwersen (c)	CE	Ray Norman
George Bradley	CE	Les Cubitt
George Iles	WG	Dick Vest
Jack Lang	FE	Albert Johnston (c)
Ike Stewart	HB	Duncan Thompson
Nelson Bass	PR	Jack Watkins
Bert Avery	HK	Dick Townsend
Tom Haddon	PR	Arthur Oxford
Bill Williams	SR	Frank Burge
Wally Somers	SR	Claud O'Donnell
Stan Walters	LF	Bill Schultz
	Int.	Jack Robinson
	Coach

18 September 1919

Waikato	5 – 58	Australia
Tries: W. Warring; Goals: William Peckham (1)	Report	Tries: Dick Vest (4), Reg Latta (2), Jack Robinson (2), Herb Gilbert, Arthur Halloway, Ray Norman, Bill Paten, Clarrie Prentice, Felix Ryan; Goals: Ray Norman (3); Arthur Halloway (1); John Kerwick (1); Norm Potter (1); Clarrie Prentice (1); Tom Sweeney (1)

Steele Park, Hamilton
Attendance: 1,500
Referee: A. Thompson

Waikato: Tonga Mahuta, Brownie Paki, A. Rayner, W. Paki, Inglis Littlewood, S. Wilson, William Peckham, Morrison, W. Warring, S. Rayner, W. Donaldson, M. Allan, W. Rayner. Reserves – . Coach –

Australia: Tom Sweeney, Bill Paten, Dick Vest, Ray Norman, Jack Robinson, Clarrie Thorogood, Arthur Halloway (c), Felix Ryan, Clarrie Prentice, John Kerwick, Norm Potter, Dick Townsend, Reg Latta. Reserves – Herb Gilbert

20 September 1919

Auckland Province	8 – 32	Australia
Tries: Bert Avery, G. Davidson; Goals: Karl Ifwersen (1)	Report	Tries: Frank Burge (4), Herb Gilbert (2), Les Cubitt, Jack Robinson; Goals: Charles Fraser (2); Ray Norman (2)

The Domain, Auckland
Attendance: 18,000
Referee: A. Ball

Auckland Province: Bill Davidson, Dougie McGregor, Thomas McClymont, Karl Ifwersen (c), G. Davidson, Ike Stewart, W. Ghent, Stan Walters, S. Lowry, Bill Williams, Bert Avery, Robert Mitchell, Nelson Bass. Reserves – Frank Delgrosso. Coach –

Australia: Charles Fraser, Harold Horder, Les Cubitt, Jack Robinson, Dick Vest, Ray Norman, Arthur Halloway (c), Bill Schultz, Claud O'Donnell, Dick Townsend, Reg Latta, Jack Watkins, Frank Burge. Reserves – Herb Gilbert

27 September 1919

Hawke's Bay	4 – 67	Australia
Tries: Goals: N. McCarthy (2/3)	Report	Tries: Les Cubitt (6), Charles Fraser (3), Frank Burge, Herb Gilbert, John Kerwick, Ray Norman, Felix Ryan, Clarrie Thorogood; Goals: Arthur Oxford (11/14); Frank Burge (0/2)

McLean Park, Napier
Attendance: 5,000
Referee: George Proxtor

Hawke's Bay: J. Fulford, Keely, P. Jackson, Pompey, C. Manning, N. McCarthy, Seymour, Fitzgerald, J. Beach, Crowley, F. Selby, E. Downing, Pat Burrows. Reserves – T. Bullivant. Coach –

Australia: Tom Sweeney, Les Cubitt, Ray Norman, Herb Gilbert, Clarrie Thorogood, Charles Fraser, Arthur Halloway (c), Felix Ryan, Clarrie Prentice, John Kerwick, Arthur Oxford, Frank Burge, Jack Watkins. Reserves –

30 September 1919

Hawke's Bay	7 – 73	Australia
Tries: Seymour; Goals: N. McCarthy (2)	Report	Tries: Les Cubitt (6), Jack Robinson (4), Dick Vest (3), Charles Fraser, Arthur Halloway, Ray Norman, Bill Schultz; Goals: Charles Fraser (3); Arthur Halloway (1); Ray Norman (1); Claud O'Donnell (1); Arthur Oxford (1); Clarrie Prentice (1)

Tomoana Showgrounds, Hastings
Attendance: 1,000

Hawke's Bay: J. Fulford, Keely, P. Jackson, Clarrie Thorogood, Bill Paten, N. McCarthy, Seymour, Fitzgerald, J. Beach, Crowley, F. Selby, E. Downing, Pat Burrows. Reserves – . Coach –

Australia: Tom Sweeney, Jack Robinson, Les Cubitt, Ray Norman, Dick Vest, Charles Fraser, Arthur Halloway (c), Bill Schultz, Clarrie Prentice, Arthur Oxford, Claud O'Donnell, Jack Watkins, Reg Latta. Reserves –

4 October 1919

Wellington	5 – 93	Australia
Tries: Alec Morris; Goals: Alec Morris (1)	Report	Tries: Les Cubitt (5), Harold Horder (3), Arthur Halloway (2), Jack Robinson (2), Dick Vest (2), Jack Watkins (2), Frank Burge, Ray Norman, Clarrie Prentice, Felix Ryan, Tom Sweeney; Goals: Frank Burge (13); Ray Norman (2)

Newtown Park, Wellington
Attendance: 1,000
Referee: c. Murphy

Wellington: Henderson, Meares, George Bradley, Whatley, Alec Morris, Mike Pollock, C. Kruse, Childe, Daske, Dawe, Joe Scott, Pheffer, Green. Reserves – . Coach –

Australia: Tom Sweeney, Harold Horder, Dick Vest, Jack Robinson, Les Cubitt, Ray Norman, Arthur Halloway (c), Bill Schultz, Clarrie Prentice, Felix Ryan, Frank Burge, John Kerwick, Jack Watkins. Reserves –

== Statistics ==
Leading Try Scorer

- 23 by Les Cubitt

Leading Point Scorer

- 69 by Les Cubitt (23 tries)

Largest Attendance

- 24,300 - Third test vs New Zealand at The Domain, Auckland

Largest non-test Attendance

- 18,000 - Auckland Proivince vs Australia at The Domain, Auckland
