= 1922 NSWRFL season =

Rugby league competition

1922 New South Wales Rugby Football League
- Teams: 9
- Premiers: North Sydney (2nd title)
- Minor premiers: North Sydney (2nd title)
- Matches played: 72
- Points scored: 1841
- Top points scorer: Harold Horder (151)
- Wooden spoon: St George (1st spoon)
- Top try-scorer: Cecil Blinkhorn (20)

The 1922 New South Wales Rugby Football League premiership was the fifteenth season of Sydney’s top-grade rugby league club competition, Australia’s first. Nine teams from across the city contested the season which culminated in North Sydney’s victory over Glebe in the premiership final.

== Season summary ==
After the clubs had played each other twice, Norths and Glebe were tied atop the points table. Instead of the points differential rule being implemented a Grand Final was held to determine the premier.

St George had another disappointing season, winning only two games against University and conceding 316 points averaging 19.75 per game.

=== Teams ===
- Balmain, formed on January 23, 1908, at Balmain Town Hall
- Eastern Suburbs, formed on January 24, 1908, at Paddington Town Hall
- Glebe, formed on January 9, 1908
- Newtown, formed on January 14, 1908
- North Sydney, formed on February 7, 1908
- South Sydney, formed on January 17, 1908, at Redfern Town Hall
- St George, formed on November 8, 1920, at Kogarah School of Arts
- Western Suburbs, formed on February 4, 1908
- University, formed in 1919 at Sydney University

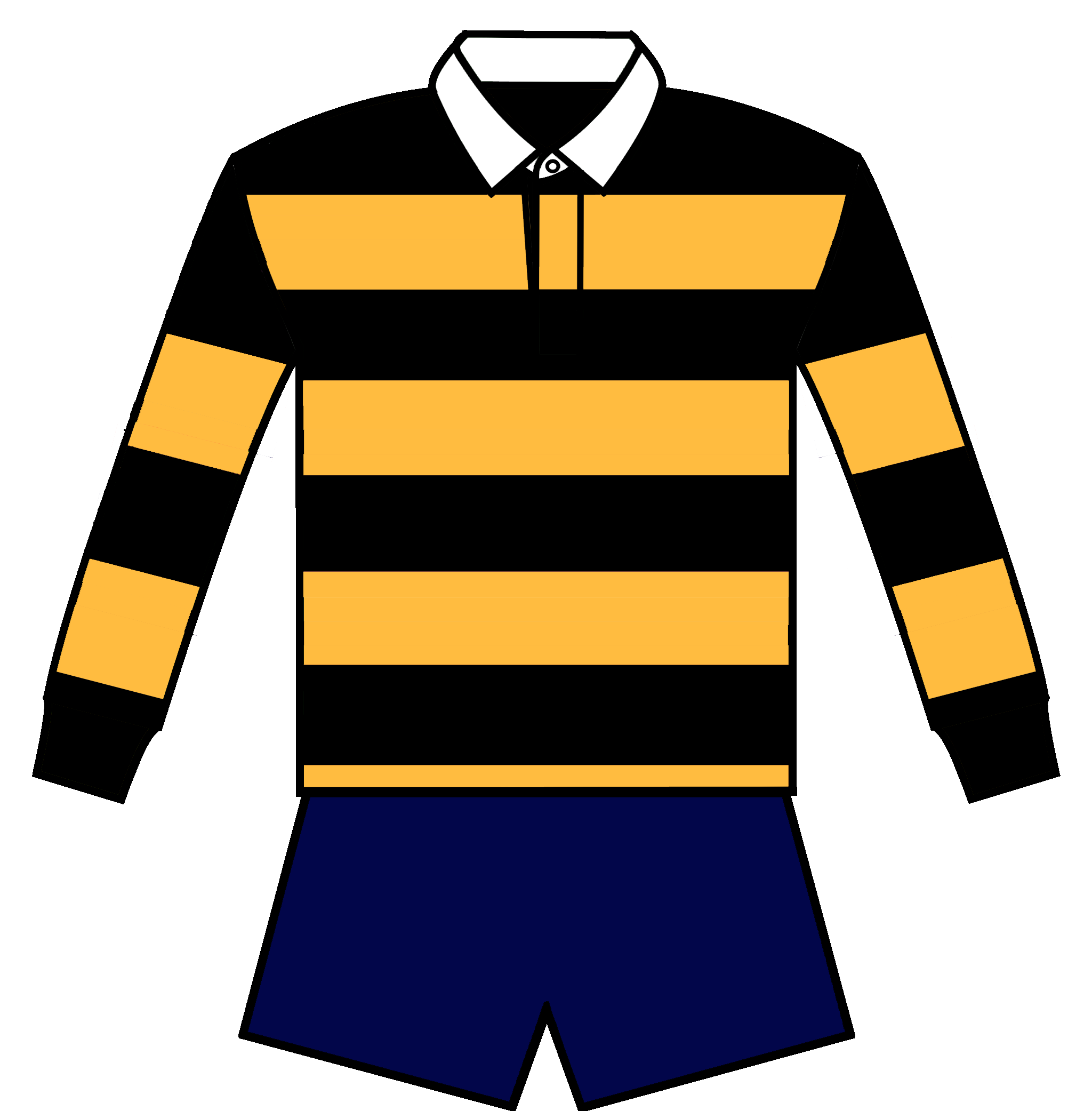
Balmain 15th season Ground: Birchgrove Oval; Captain-Coach: Charles Fraser

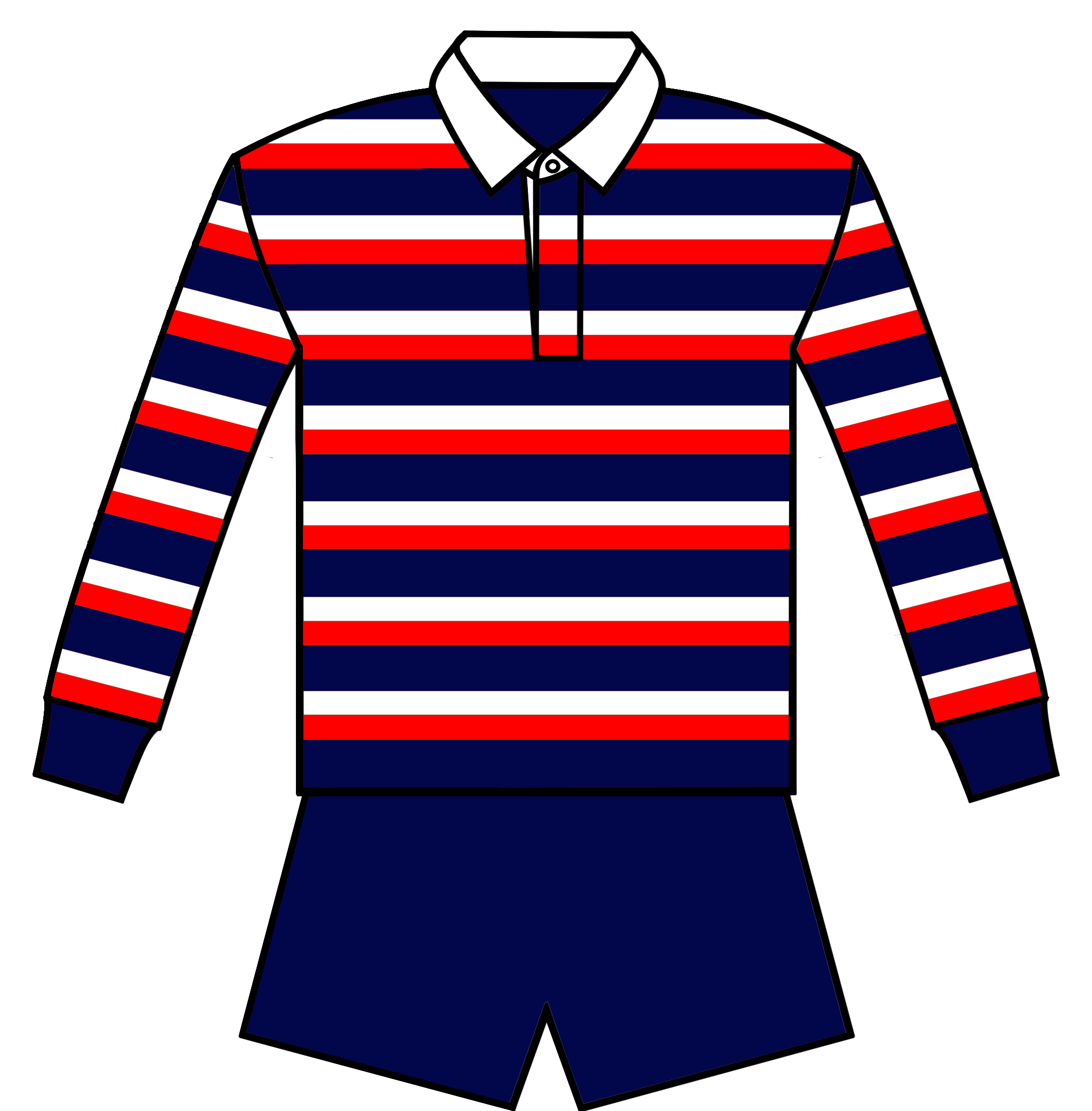
Eastern Suburbs 15th season Ground: Sydney Sports Ground; Coach:Ray Norman; Captain: Harry Caples

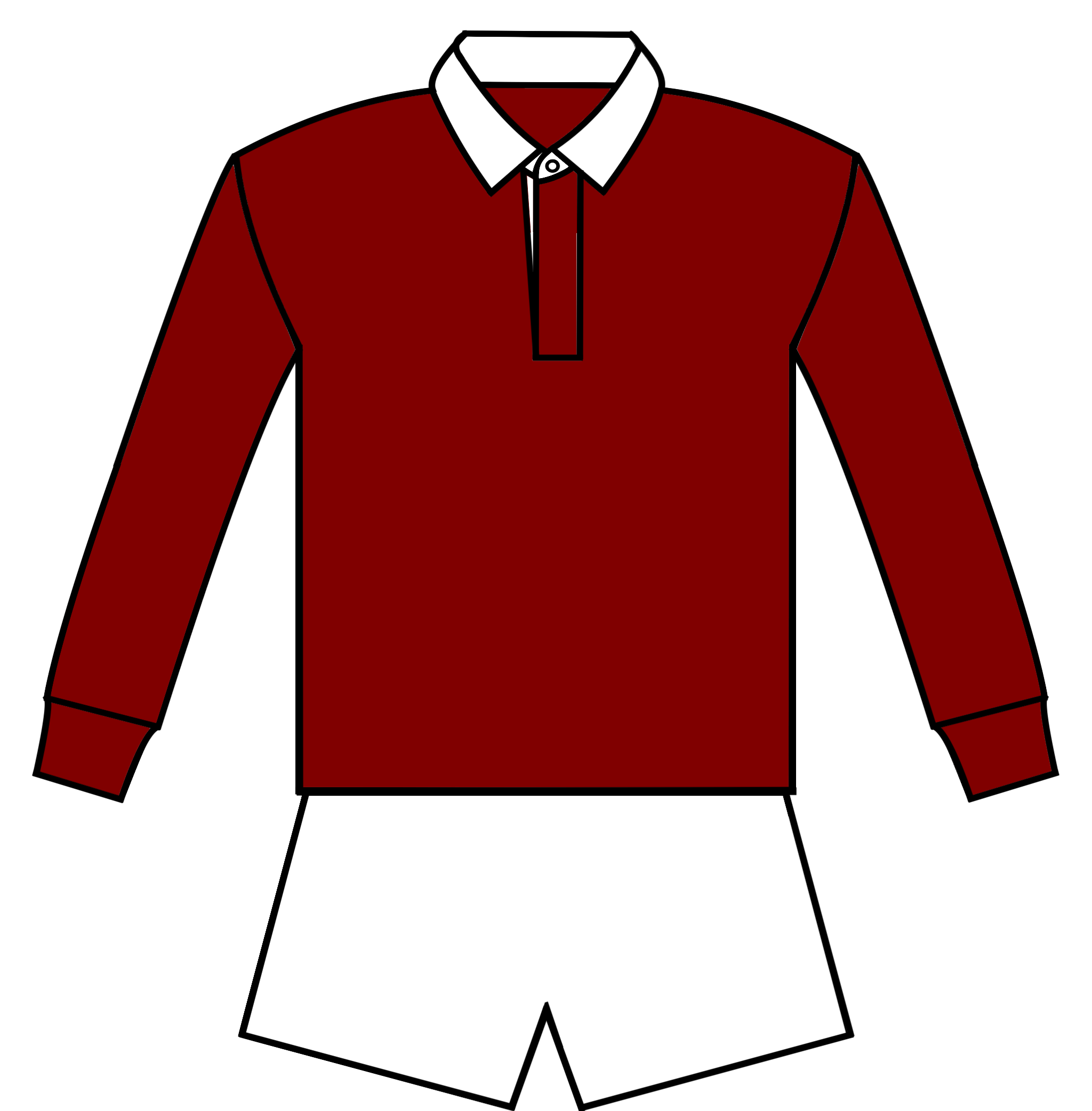
Glebe 15th season Ground: Wentworth Oval; Captain(s): Frank Burge, Bill Benson

Newtown 15th season Ground: Sydney Sports Ground; Coach: Bill Farnsworth; Captain: Felix Ryan

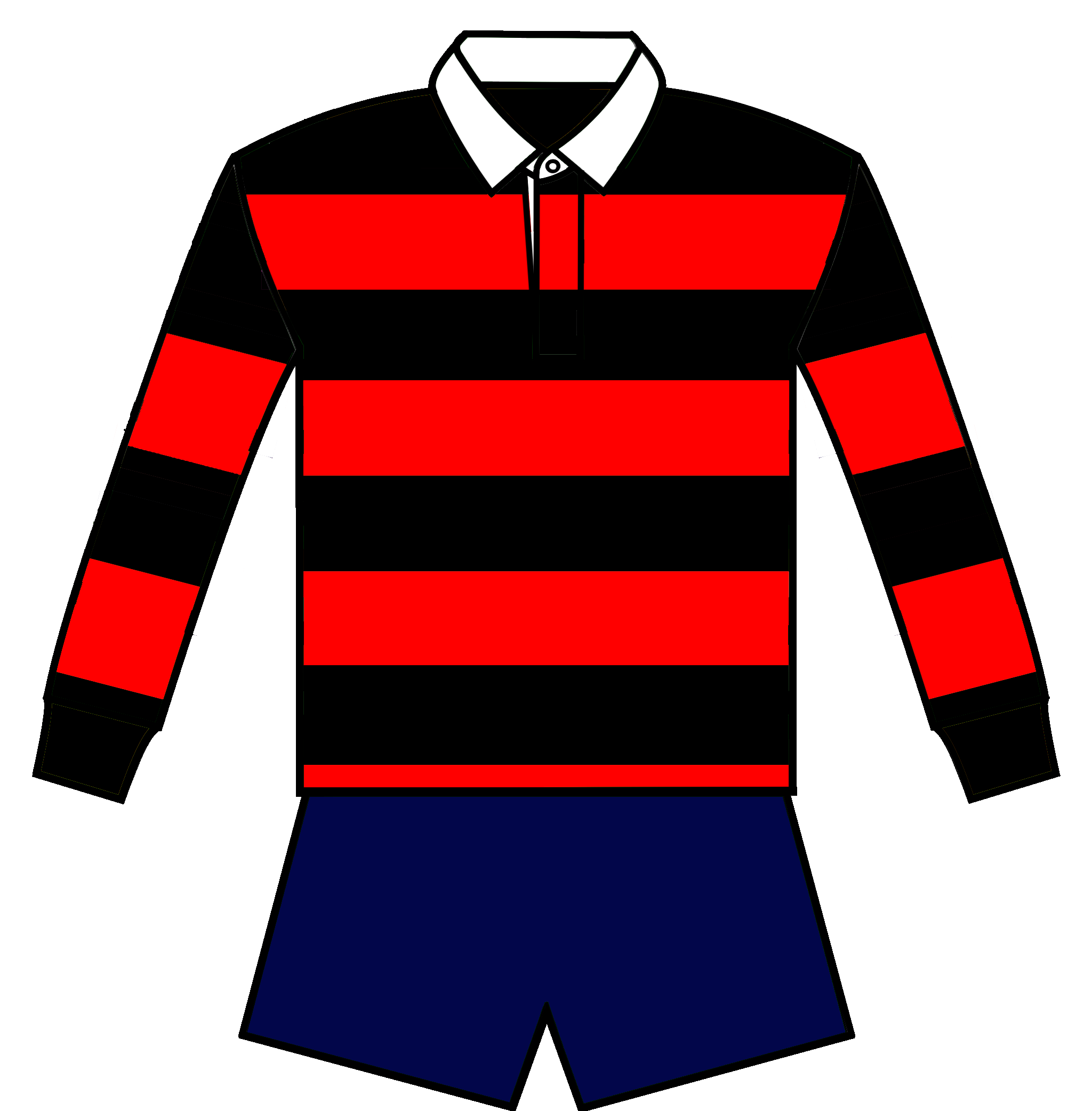
North Sydney 15th season Ground: North Sydney Oval; Coach: Chris McKivat; Captain: Duncan Thompson

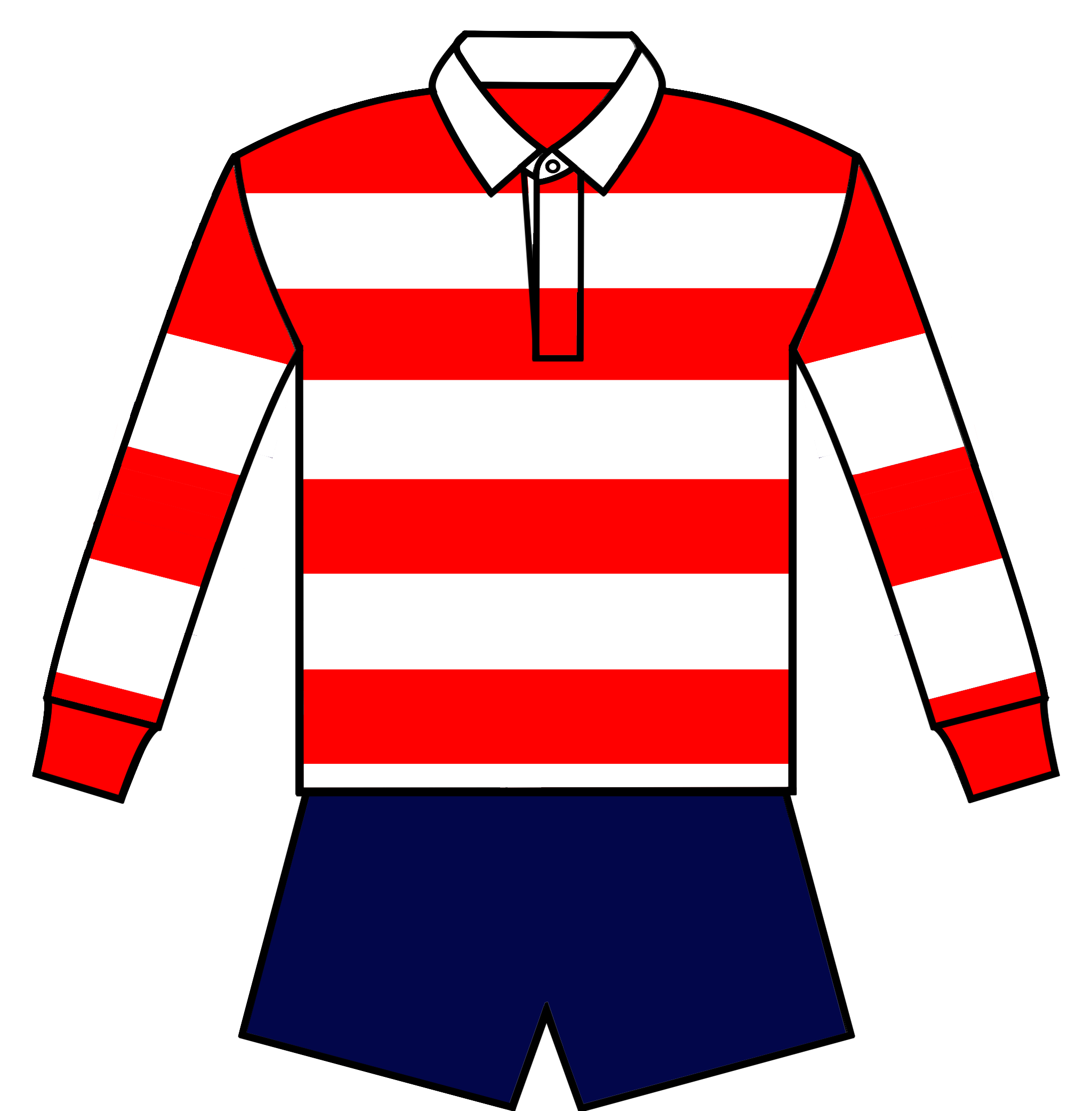
St. George 2nd season Ground: Hurstville Oval; Captain: Albert Johnston; Coach: Herb Gilbert

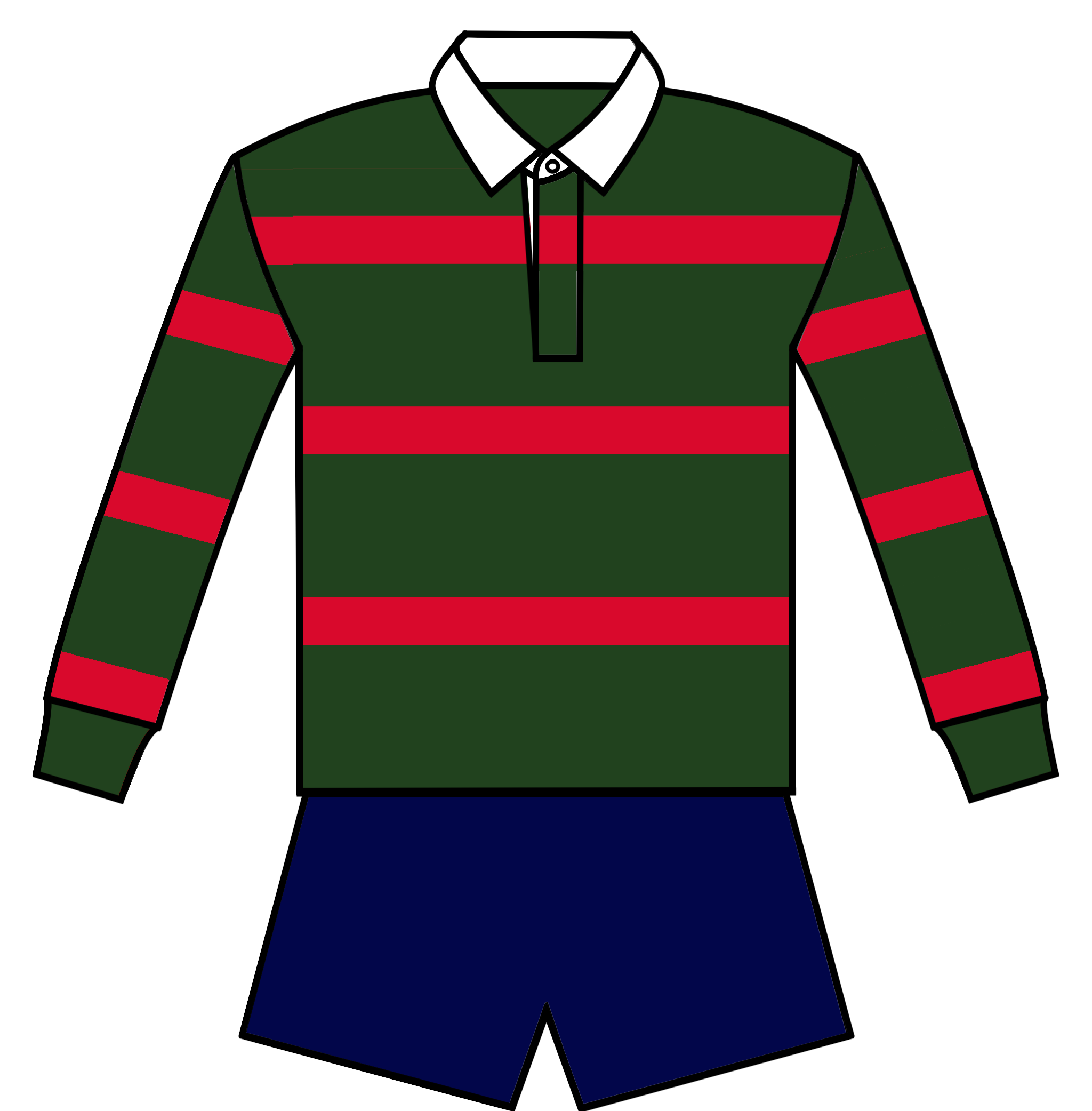
South Sydney 15th season Ground: Sydney Cricket Ground; Coach: Howard Hallett; Captain: Alf Blair

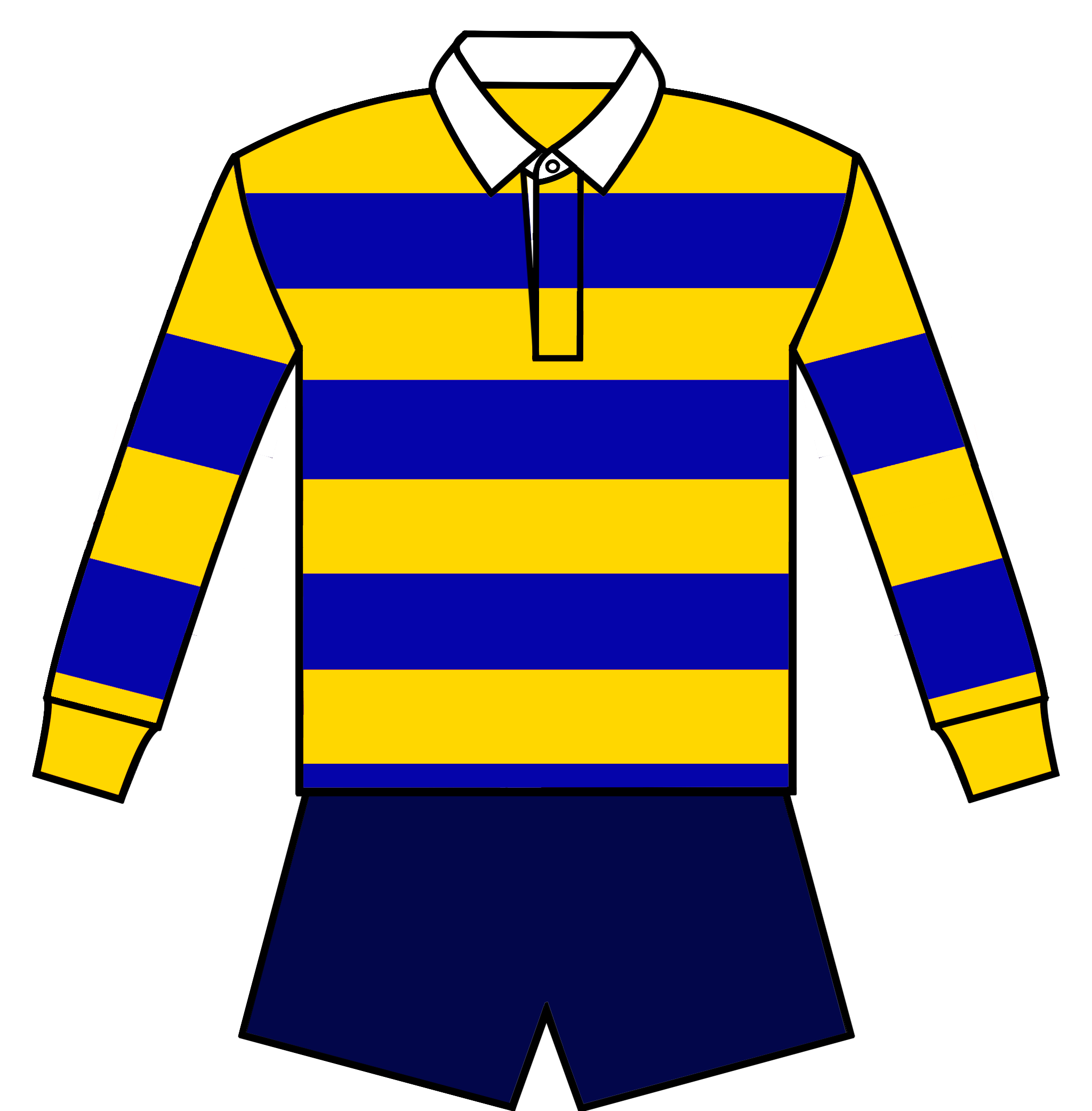
University 3rd season Coach: Sandy Pearce; Captain: Jim Craig, Paddy Conaghan

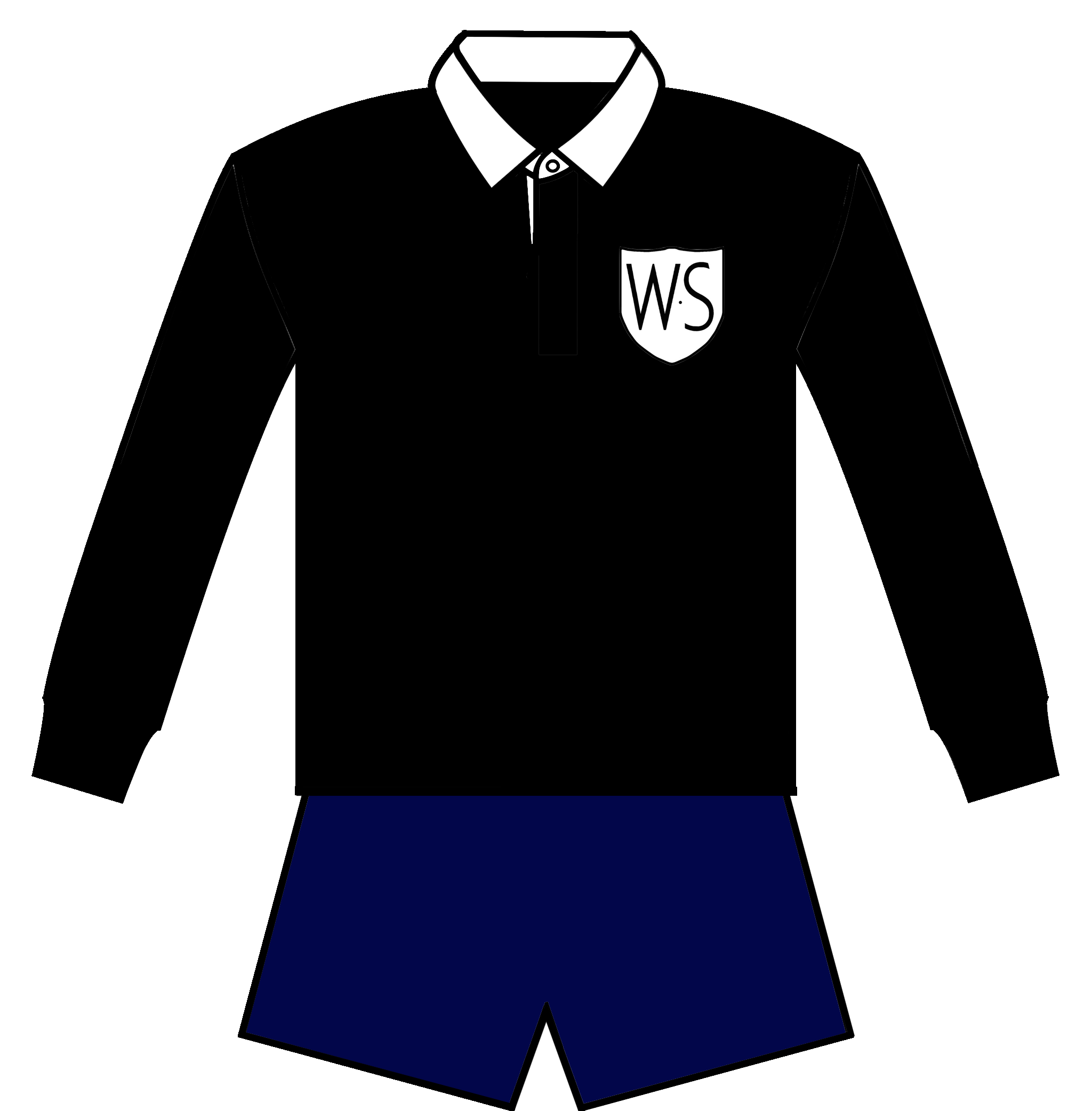
Western Suburbs 15th season Ground: Pratten Park; Captain-Coach: Ted Brooks; Co Captain: Dick Vest

=== Ladder ===
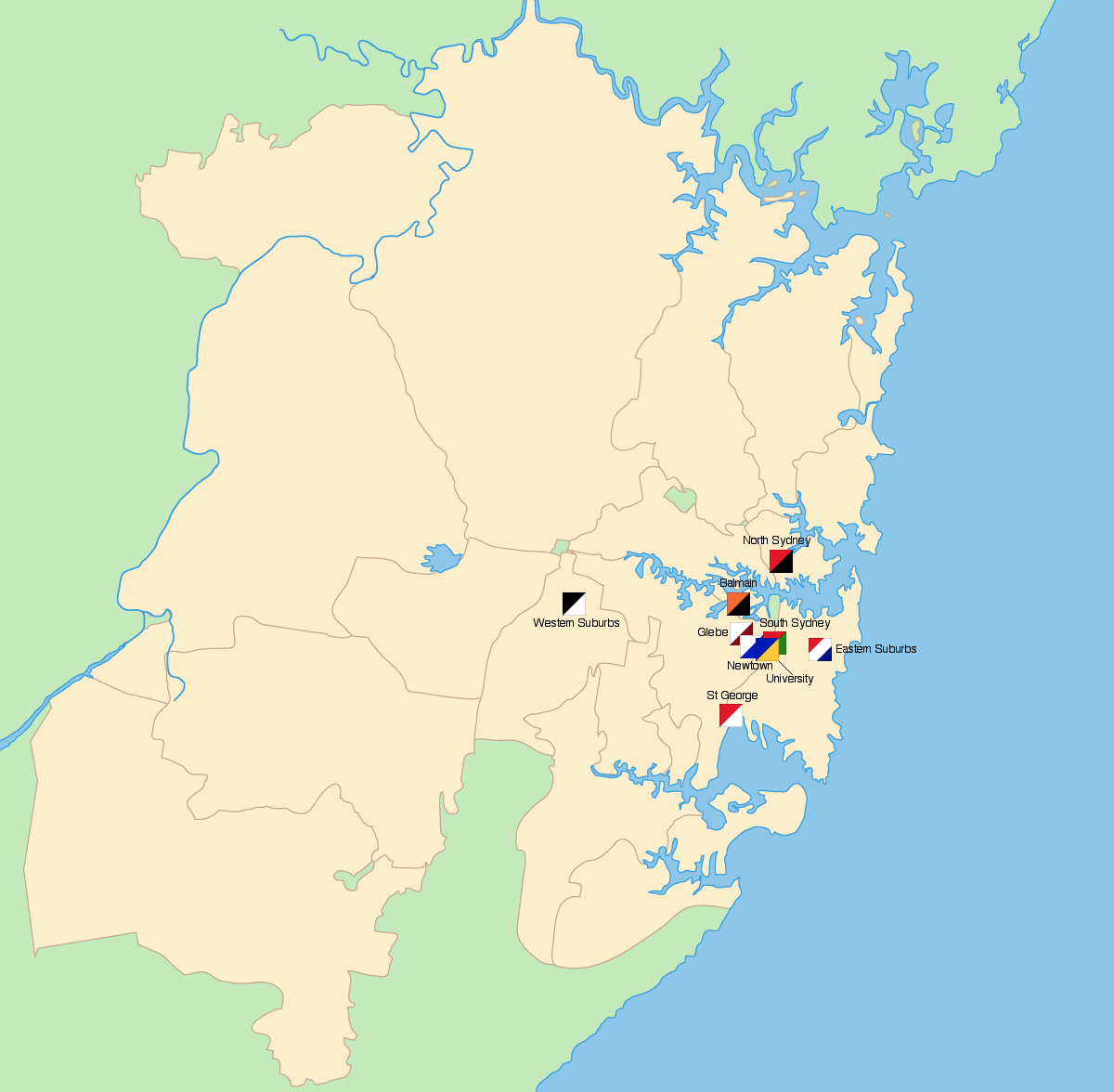
The geographical locations of the teams that contested the 1922 premiership across Sydney.

	Team	Pld	W	D	L	B	PF	PA	PD	Pts
1	North Sydney	16	12	0	4	2	306	136	+170	28
2	Glebe	16	12	0	4	2	284	154	+130	28
3	Eastern Suburbs	16	9	2	5	2	217	177	+40	24
4	South Sydney	15	9	1	5	2	207	187	+20	23
5	Balmain	16	8	2	6	2	168	145	+23	22
6	Western Suburbs	16	6	0	10	2	164	201	-37	16
7	Newtown	16	5	1	10	2	169	200	-31	15
8	Sydney University	15	5	0	10	2	148	287	-139	14
9	St George	16	2	0	14	2	140	316	-176	8

== Final ==
Glebe	Position	North Sydney
Ron Stapleton	FB	Norm Proctor
Charlie Ogle	WG	Harold Horder
Ed Summers	CE	Frank Rule
Tommy James	CE	Herman Peters
Jack Toohey	WG	Cec Blinkhorn
William Stirton	FE	Dallas Hodgins
Bill Benson	HB	Duncan Thompson (c)
Frank Burge (c)	PR	Reg Farnell
Bert Gray	HK	Clarrie Ives
Laidley Burge	PR	Jim Pye
Tony Redmond	SR	Jack Baker
Walter Haddock	SR	George Green
Tom McGrath	LK	Wally Hancock
	Coach	Chris McKivat

As North Sydney and Glebe were tied on competition points a final was played at the Sydney Cricket Ground on 6 September, before a crowd of around 15,000. The match was officiated by Tom McMahon, the elder of the two pre-war referees of that name.

The game was not as even as the ladder at the end of regular season would have suggested. Norths completely got away to a 10-0 lead at half-time and went on to demolish Glebe 35-3, taking their second consecutive premiership crown. The legendary Harold Horder scored twenty individual points in the match.

This was North Sydney’s second premiership, their last before becoming the Bears in 1959, and last before being excluded from the competition after the 1999 NRL season. There have been ongoing efforts to resurrect North Sydney in some capacity. In 2025, North Sydney were finally successful in doing this as they won the bid along with the Western Australian consortiuum for the NRL's 17th team to enter the competition as the Perth Bears.

North Sydney 35 (Tries: Rule 2, Blinkhorn 2, Horder 2, Peters. Goals: Horder 7 )

defeated

Glebe 3 (Try: E Summers)

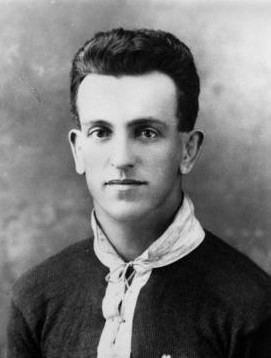
Duncan Thompson

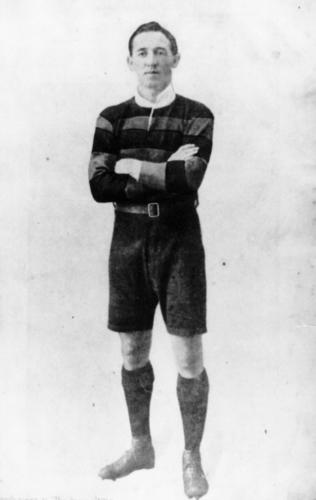
Harold Horder

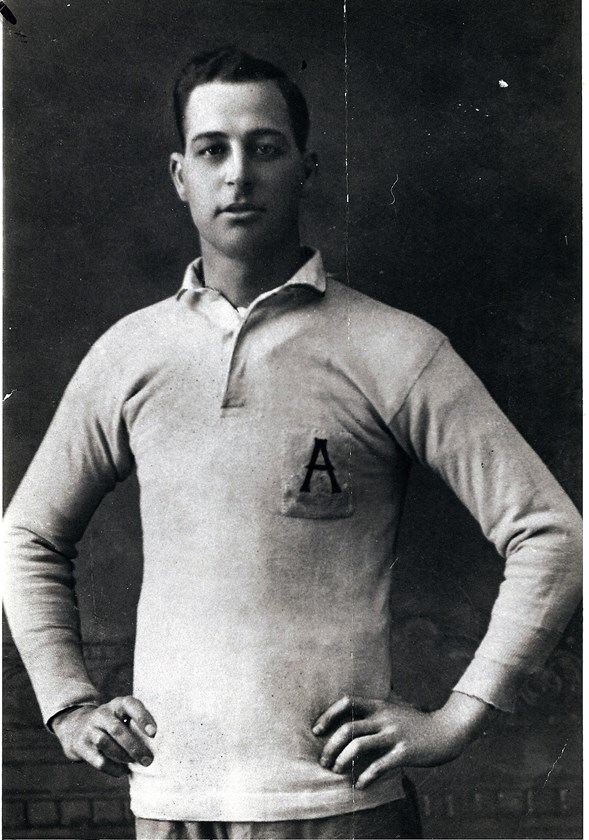
Cec Blinkhorn

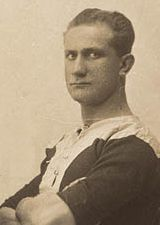
Frank Burge
