= Ted Dawson =

Ted Dawson may refer to:

- Ted Dawson (rugby league) (born 1923), Australian rugby league footballer
- Ted M. Dawson (born 1959), American neurologist and neuroscientist
