= Tom Sweeney (rugby league) =

Australian rugby league footballer (1897–1964)

Personal information
- Full name: Thomas Sweeney
- Born: 24 January 1897 Gympie, Queensland, Australia
- Died: 29 August 1964 (aged 67) Wooloowin, Queensland, Australia

Playing information
- Position: Fullback
Representative
Years	Team	Pld	T	G	FG	P
1918–19	Queensland	7	0	0	0	0
1919	Australia	2	0	0	0	0

Thomas Sweeney (24 January 1897 – 29 August 1964) was an Australian rugby league footballer.

Sweeney, the son of Irish immigrants, was born in Gympie, Queensland.

A fullback, Sweeney was a good attacking player and a strong tackler. He played his rugby league for Brisbane club Western Suburbs and had a brief representative career. In 1919, Sweeney was one of two fullbacks selected by the Kangaroos for their tour of New Zealand, where they played four Test matches against the home side. He appeared in the opening two fixtures, with Charles Fraser preferred thereafter.

Sweeney, a public servant, served as secretary of the Queensland Irish Association during the 1920s and was also a long–serving secretary for the state branch of the Australian Journalists Association. He had four sons and two daughters. One of his sons was the Wallabies fullback Thomas Sweeney.
