= Pat Burrows =

New Zealand international rugby league footballer

Personal information
- Full name: Patrick Jessie Burrows
- Born: 1897 New Zealand
- Height: 5 ft 10 in (178 cm)
- Weight: 12 st 10 lb (178 lb; 81 kg)

Playing information
- Position: Hooker
Representative
Years	Team	Pld	T	G	FG	P
	Hawke's Bay
1921	New Zealand	1	0	0	0	0

Patrick Jessie Burrows was a New Zealand rugby league player who represented New Zealand.

== Playing career ==
Burrows played for the Hawke's Bay and was in the team for both of their matches against Australia during the 1919 Kangaroo tour of New Zealand. The following year he represented North Island against a touring Great Britain team. In 1921 he was selected to represent New Zealand. New Zealand toured Australia that year. No Test matches were played on tour, instead New Zealand played Queensland and New South Wales. Burrows played as a Prop in the 27–14 win against Newcastle.
