= Charlie Thorogood =

Australian rugby league footballer

Personal information
- Full name: Charles Edwin Thorogood
- Born: 2 September 1894
- Died: 10 November 1958 (aged 64)

Playing information
- Position: Centre / Five-eighth
Representative
Years	Team	Pld	T	G	FG	P
1918–22	Queensland	9	2	5	0	16
1919	Australia	2	0	0	0	0

Charles Edwin Thorogood (2 September 1894 – 10 November 1958) was an Australian rugby league footballer.

Thorogood came from Bundaberg and was a junior product of Brisbane side Dunellan.

A centre and five-eighth, Thorogood became a foundation player for Coorparoo in 1917 and remained with the club for the remainder of his playing career. He represented Australia as a utility back on their 1919 tour of New Zealand, where he featured in two of the four Test matches. For his final season with Coorparoo in 1923, Thorogood bowed out by captaining to the club to a grand final win over Valleys, with a best afield performance.
