= Mike Pollock (rugby league) =

New Zealand international rugby league footballer

Personal information
- Full name: Michael John Pollock
- Born: 1886; New Zealand
- Died: Deceased

Playing information
- Position: Halfback
Representative
Years	Team	Pld	T	G	FG	P
≤1919–≥20	Wellington
1919–20	New Zealand	2	0	0	0	0

Michael John Pollock (birth unknown – death unknown) was a New Zealand professional rugby league footballer who played in the 1910s and 1920s. He played at representative level for New Zealand, and Wellington, as a scrum-half.

== Playing career ==
=== International honours ===
Mike Pollock represented New Zealand in 1919 against Australia, and in 1920 against Great Britain.
