= Frank Rule =

Australian rugby league footballer

Personal information
- Full name: Francis Eugene Rule
- Born: 20 February 1896; Waverley, New South Wales, Australia
- Died: 6 April 1982 (aged 86); Stratford, Victoria, Australia

Playing information
- Position: Centre
Club
Years	Team	Pld	T	G	FG	P
1920–27	North Sydney	83	10	0	0	30
Representative
Years	Team	Pld	T	G	FG	P
1921–25	New South Wales	12	3	0	0	9
1922	Metropolis	1	0	0	0	0

Francis Rule (1896–1982) was an Australian rugby league footballer who played as a centre in the 1920s.

== Playing career ==
Rule was a champion centre with North Sydney and won two premierships with them in 1921 and 1922. Rule played seven seasons with Norths between 1920 and 1927. He also represented New South Wales on six occasions between 1923 and 1925.

Rule died on 6 April 1982, aged 86.
