= Harold Bissett =

Australian rugby league footballer (1889–1950)

Personal information
- Full name: Harold Victor Bissett
- Born: 24 June 1889 Goulburn, New South Wales, Australia
- Died: 7 June 1950 (aged 60) Homebush, New South Wales, Australia

Playing information
- Position: Centre, Wing
Club
Years	Team	Pld	T	G	FG	P
1912–14	Western Suburbs	16	2	0	0	6
Representative
Years	Team	Pld	T	G	FG	P
1913	New South Wales	2	3	0	0	9

Harold Victor Bissett (24 June 1889 – 7 June 1950) was an Australian rugby league footballer.

Born in Goulburn, Bissett was the son of a Post Master and grew up in the Western Suburbs of Sydney.

Bissett competed as a centre and winger for Western Suburbs from 1912 to 1914, with most of his first–grade appearances coming in the 1913 season. He gained representative honours for New South Wales in 1913, playing twice against Queensland during a visit to Brisbane and scoring three tries.

In addition to rugby league, Bissett also played first–grade cricket for Western Suburbs, rugby union with Wests and was a New South Wales 880 yards running champion.

Bissett, a municipal clerk by profession, enlisted with the 1st AIF and in April 1915 was deployed to Gallipoli. He served with the 1st Australian Army Casualty Clearing Station in both Gallipoli and France, helping to treat wounded soldiers, then in 1917 transferred to the Australian Army Pay Corp.
