= Colin York =

Australian rugby league footballer

Personal information
- Full name: Colin York
- Born: 1904 Yass, New South Wales, Australia
- Died: 1973 (aged 68–69)

Playing information
- Position: Prop, Second-row
Representative
| Years | Team | Pld | T | G | FG | P |
|---|---|---|---|---|---|---|
| 1928–30 | New South Wales | 6 | 1 | 0 | 0 | 3 |
| 1928 | Australia | 2 | 0 | 0 | 0 | 0 |
- As of 31 Aug 2021

Colin 'Yic' York (1904–1973) was an Australian rugby league footballer who played in the 1920s and 1930s. He played for Yass between 1923 and 1926, spent a season with Queanbeyan in 1927 before returning to Yass in 1928 to 1930. He was born in Yass, New South Wales. York primarily played as a prop-forward representing Australia in two test matches against Great Britain. York later played with Morpeth in the Newcastle coalfields competition and captain coached Nowra. He later moved to Sydney and became a committee man for the Canterbury RLFC.

In 1928 York was selected to play for Southern Districts (which at the time represented the Riverina region). This team competed in the Country Carnival in May, which included a match against Eastern Suburbs on May 5. York then represented Combined Country against Combined City on Wednesday, May 9. He was selected and played for New South Wales in matches against Queensland on May 12 and 19. York again played for New South Wales against the touring Great Britain team on June 2. York was selected and played for Australia in the First Test in Brisbane. Despite several changes to the Australian team after a narrow loss, York was retained for the Second Test in Sydney on July 14.

York continued to represent New South Wales in 1929 and 1930. In all, York played twice for Australia and six times for NSW.
