= Reg Farnell =

Australian rugby league footballer

Personal information
- Full name: Reginald Cox Farnell
- Born: 26 March 1891 Randwick, New South Wales
- Died: 11 July 1972 (aged 81) Tweed Heads, New South Wales

Playing information
- Position: Prop, Second-row, Hooker, Centre
Club
Years	Team	Pld	T	G	FG	P
1915–18	North Sydney	41	3	7	0	23
1919	Eastern Suburbs	13	2	0	0	6
1922–23	North Sydney	22	2	0	0	6
	Total	76	7	7	0	35
Representative
Years	Team	Pld	T	G	FG	P
1919	New South Wales	1	0	0	0	0
- Source: As of 13 February 2019

Reginald Cox Farnell (1891–1972) was an Australian rugby league footballer who played in the 1910s and 1920s.

== Playing career ==
Farnell was a premiership winning rugby league player for North Sydney. Farnell played six seasons with North Sydney between 1915-1918 and 1922-1923.

He also played one season for Eastern Suburbs in 1919. Farnell played prop forward in the victorious North Sydney team that won the 1922 Grand Final, and also made one appearance for New South Wales in 1919.

Farrell died at Tweed Heads, New South Wales on 11 July 1972, aged 81.
