= Les Hutchings =

Australian rugby league footballer

Personal information
- Full name: Les Hutchings
- Born: Condobolin, New South Wales, Australia

Playing information
- Position: Halfback
Club
| Years | Team | Pld | T | G | FG | P |
|---|---|---|---|---|---|---|
| 1970–73 | Canterbury-Bankstown | 43 | 8 | 0 | 0 | 24 |
Representative
| Years | Team | Pld | T | G | FG | P |
| 1970 | New South Wales | 2 | 0 | 0 | 0 | 0 |
| 1968–70 | NSW Country | 3 | 1 | 0 | 1 | 5 |
- Source: As of 14 February 2024

Les Hutchings is an Australian former professional rugby league footballer who played in the 1970s. He played for Canterbury-Bankstown in the NSWRL competition.

== Playing career ==
Hutchings hailed from the New South Wales town of Condobolin. Hutchings had played for the Country New South Wales rugby league team before signing with Canterbury-Bankstown. He made his first grade debut for Canterbury in round 15 of the 1970 NSWRFL season against South Sydney at the Sydney Sports Ground.

In the same year, he was selected for New South Wales and played two interstate matches against Queensland. Hutchings made a total of 43 appearances for Canterbury between 1970 and 1973.
