= Selby McFarlane =

Australian rugby league footballer

Personal information
- Full name: Selby Oliver William McFarlane
- Born: 4 August 1891 Crookwell, New South Wales, Australia
- Died: 29 December 1976 (aged 85) Sydney, New South Wales, Australia

Playing information
- Position: Halfback, Five-eighth
Club
Years	Team	Pld	T	G	FG	P
1909–15	North Sydney	75	13	20	0	79
Representative
Years	Team	Pld	T	G	FG	P
1913	New South Wales	3	3	0	0	9
- Source: As of 21 June 2019

Selby McFarlane (1891−1976) was an Australian rugby league footballer who played in the 1900s and 1910s. He played for North Sydney in the NSWRL competition.

== Playing career ==
McFarlane made his debut for North Sydney in the 1909 season. McFarlane finished as the club's top point scorer in 1909 and 1910. In 1913, McFarlane was selected to represent New South Wales and played in 3 games against Queensland.

McFarlane played with Norths up until the end of the 1915 season before retiring. After retirement, McFarlane enlisted in the Australian Army and served in World War I.
