= George Robinson (rugby league) =

Australian rugby league footballer and coach

Personal information
- Full name: George Robinson
- Born: 29 August 1894; Pyrmont, New South Wales, Australia
- Died: 23 January 1987 (aged 92)

Playing information
- Height: 1.52 m (5 ft 0 in)
- Position: Halfback, Five-eighth
Club
Years	Team	Pld	T	G	FG	P
1915–28	Balmain	85	24	44	0	160
Representative
Years	Team	Pld	T	G	FG	P
1919	New South Wales	1	0	0	0	0
1922	Metropolis	2	1	2	0	7

Coaching information
Club
Years	Team	Gms	W	D	L	W%
1933–35	Balmain	44	17	4	23	39
- Source: As of 15 March 2019
- Relatives: Jack 'Junker' Robinson (brother)

George Robinson nicknamed "Wee George" was an Australian professional rugby league footballer who played in the 1910s and 1920s. He played his entire career for Balmain in the NSWRL competition during the club's first golden era which won 6 premierships. Robinson later coached the club at various levels.

== Background ==
Robinson was born in Balmain, New South Wales, Australia. He was the brother of Jack 'Junker' Robinson who played for Balmain between 1912 and 1925.

== Playing career ==
Robinson began his first grade career with Balmain in 1915 winning a premiership in his first season at the club. The 1915 premiership was also Balmain's first. Robinson did not play for the club in 1916 or 1917 missing out on those premiership successes but returned to Balmain in 1918.

In 1919, Robinson won his second premiership with Balmain as they finished top of the table without needing to play in a grand final to determine the outright premiership winner. This was followed by his third premiership win with Balmain as they finished first on the table ahead of rivals Glebe. In the same year, Robinson was selected to play for New South Wales.

In 1922, Robinson was selected to play for Metropolis, the earlier version of the NSW City rugby league team.

In 1924, Robinson played 6 games for Balmain but missed out on playing in the club's grand final victory over South Sydney. Robinson played with Balmain up until the end of 1928 before retiring.

== Coaching career ==
Robinson became first grade coach of Balmain in 1933. His time as first grade coach at the club was not as successful as when he was a player and the club missed out on the finals in each of his 3 seasons there.

Robinson then went on to coach the Balmain reserve grade side for 32 consecutive years and was later made a life member of the club.
