= Cec Blinkhorn =

Australia international rugby league footballer

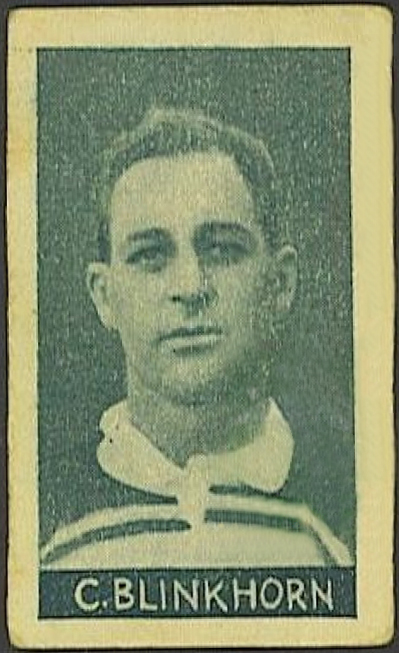
- Blinkhorn in 1925

Personal information
- Full name: Cyril Rhodes Blinkhorn
- Born: 18 April 1892 Redfern, New South Wales, New South Wales, Australia
- Died: 8 April 1977 (aged 84) Blacktown, New South Wales, Australia

Playing information
- Position: Wing
Club
Years	Team	Pld	T	G	FG	P
1914–18	North Sydney	50	34	5	0	112
1919	South Sydney	7	1	0	0	3
1920–23	North Sydney	41	45	0	0	135
1924	South Sydney	9	6	0	0	18
	Total	107	86	5	0	268
Representative
Years	Team	Pld	T	G	FG	P
1921–24	New South Wales	8	6	0	0	18
1921–24	Australia	6	4	0	0	12
1915–22	Metropolis	3	2	0	0	6

Cyril "Cec" Blinkhorn (18 April 1892 – 8 April 1977) was an Australian rugby league footballer who played in the 1910s and 1920s. He played in the NSWRFL premiership for the North Sydney and South Sydney clubs, and also represented New South Wales and Australia. He primarily played on the wing and has been named amongst the nation's finest footballers of the 20th century.

== Biography ==
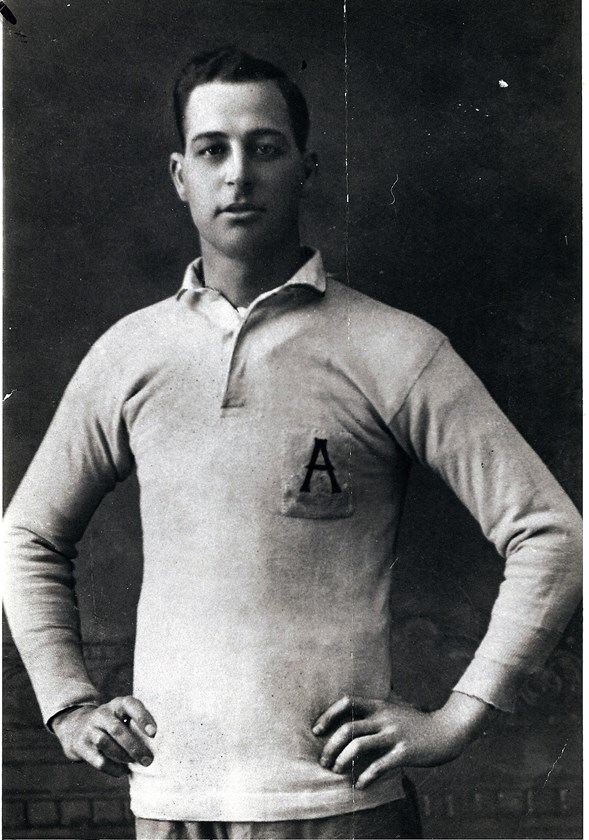
Cec Blinkhorn

=== Playing career ===
Although born in Redfern, the middle of Souths territory, Blinkhorn grew up a Norths supporter after moving to Chatswood. He was graded to Norths in 1914 and made his debut against South Sydney on 15 August 1914 at North Sydney Oval, and for five years he was the team's leading try-scorer. Blinkhorn spent the 1919 season at Souths, where he met fellow winger, Harold Horder. In 1920, Horder and Blinkhorn moved to Norths, where they remained until 1923. Both wingers returned to Souths in 1924.

Blinkhorn was a member of the premiership winning Norths teams of 1921, where the team went through undefeated, and 1922 when Norths met Glebe in the Grand final. Blinkhorn scored two tries.

=== Representative career ===
Blinkhorn middle row 3rd from right with the 1921-22 Kangaroos

Blinkhorn was first selected to play for Australia in 1921. On that 1921–22 Kangaroo tour of Great Britain, he scored a record 39 tries in 29 matches and played in three Tests. This record still stands as the most tries scored on a Kangaroo tour and will most likely never be beaten. He played one further Test against England in 1924. Cec Blinkhorn is Kangaroo No. 116.

=== Accolades ===
In February 2008, Blinkhorn was named in the list of Australia's 100 Greatest Players (1908–2007) which was commissioned by the NRL and ARL to celebrate the code's centenary year in Australia. He was described by some who saw him play as the only player to have possessed a triple sidestep.

=== Family legacy ===
Four of Cec's nephews all made appearances for Norths. Clarrie Blinkhorn played in the 1930s. His brothers Jack (61 games 1956–659) and Harold (74 games 1956–62) played in the forwards in the 1950s and 1960s, while Douglas was a three-quarter who made 11 first-grade appearances in 1961–62.

=== Later contributions to rugby league ===
Blinkhorn later moved to western Sydney where he helped establish the Colyton Colts JRLFC. Cec Blinkhorn Oval in Oxley Park is named in his honour.

== Sources ==
- Whiticker, Alan; Hudson, Glen (2007). The Encyclopedia of Rugby League Players. Wetherill Park, New South Wales: Gary Allen Pty Ltd. p. 40. ISBN 978-1-877082-93-1.
