= Alec Morris =

New Zealand international rugby league footballer

Personal information
- Full name: Alexander Morris
- Born: 1892 Bulls, Manawatū-Whanganui, New Zealand
- Died: 30 July 1957 (aged 64–65) Hamilton, Waikato, New Zealand

Playing information
- Weight: 10 st 5 lb (66 kg)

Rugby union
- Position: First Five-eighth
Club
| Years | Team | Pld | T | G | FG | P |
|---|---|---|---|---|---|---|
| 1911–13 | Poneke |
| 1914 | Newtown (Sydney) | 9 | 2 | 4 | 0 | 16 |
| 1918 | Poneke |
| | Total | 9 | 2 | 4 | 0 | 16 |
Representative
| Years | Team | Pld | T | G | FG | P |
| 1911–18 | Wellington |
| 1914 | Sydney Metropolitan | 4 | 2 | 0 | 0 | 6 |
| 1914 | New South Wales | 1 | 0 | 0 | 0 | 0 |

Rugby league
- Position: Wing, Five-eighth
Club
| Years | Team | Pld | T | G | FG | P |
|---|---|---|---|---|---|---|
| 1919–21 | Athletic | 8 | 7 | 5 | 0 | 31 |
Representative
| Years | Team | Pld | T | G | FG | P |
| 1919 | Wellington | 3 | 3 | 2 | 0 | 13 |
| 1919 | New Zealand | 2 | 0 | 0 | 0 | 0 |

Alexander "Alec" Morris (birth unknown – death unknown) was a New Zealand professional rugby league footballer who played in the 1910s. He played at representative level for New Zealand, and Wellington, as a wing or five-eighth.

== Playing career ==
=== Rugby ===
Alec (Snowy) Morris played rugby for Poneke and had represented Wellington in 1911. He played for Poneke right through the junior grades and in 1914 was reported as having already spent 14 years at the club. He was moving to Sydney at the beginning of that year and played for Newtown. While there he played for the Sydney Metropolitan team against the All Blacks on 5 August, and then a few days later he played for New South Wales in a 25-10 loss to the All Blacks. He played them a third time in an 'Olympic' fundraiser match but only a small crowd turned out owing to war have just broken out. Morris soon returned to New Zealand and went off to war. He later switched codes in July 1918 after falling out of favour with his club selector just weeks prior to being selected for the New Zealand rugby league team.

=== International honours ===
Alec Morris represented New Zealand in 1919 against Australia in the first 2 tests. Morris played for Wellington against Canterbury on 13 September in a 23 all draw. he kicked a penalty in the middle stages to give Wellington a 15 to 8 lead. He played in a loss for Wellington against Canterbury in Christchurch though he did score 2 tries. He then played in the match between Wellington and Australia in which the home team were thrashed 93-5 with Morris scoring a try and kicking a goal.

In 1920 he was only listed in one match for Athletic however in 1921 he played in at least 4 matches for them as well as playing in a Wellington City side against Petone as a trial for the Wellington team. He scored a try in the match but had to go off injured. In 1922 he applied for reinstatement which was eventually granted and he rejoined his old Poneke club.
