= Claud O'Donnell =

Australian dual-code rugby player

- Born: Claud Augustus O'Donnell; 30 January 1886 Sydney, New South Wales
- Died: 4 August 1953 (aged 67) Glebe, New South Wales

Rugby union career
- Position: hooker
Amateur team(s)
Years	Team	Apps	(Points)
- Glebe RUFC
Provincial / State sides
Years	Team	Apps	(Points)
1912–13	New South Wales		
International career
Years	Team	Apps	(Points)
1913	Wallabies	2	(0)
- Rugby league career

Playing information
- Position: Hooker
Club
Years	Team	Pld	T	G	FG	P
1915–17	Glebe Dirty Reds	39				0
1918	South Sydney	13				3
1919–22	Souths Magpies
1923	North Sydney Bears	10				0
	Total	62	0	0	0	3
Representative
Years	Team	Pld	T	G	FG	P
1919–22	Queensland	6				3
1919	Australia	4				0

Claud Augustus O'Donnell (30 January 1886 – 4 August 1953) was an Australian rugby union and rugby league player and represented his country at both sports as a dual-code rugby international.

== Rugby union career ==
O'Donnell played rugby union with the Glebe club in inner city Sydney. He made his representative debut for New South Wales in 1912 and the following year made two Test appearances as hooker for the Wallabies against the All Blacks in the 1913 tour of New Zealand.

== Rugby league career ==
Switching to rugby league O'Donnell joined the Glebe Dirty Reds in 1915 and had three seasons in the Sydney premiership. In 1918 he moved to Brisbane and joined the Carltons club, one of the early incarnations of the Souths Magpies. From there he made state appearances for Queensland against New South Wales over four years and in 1919 was selected in the Australian team as hooker. He played in all four Tests of the 1919 rugby league tour of New Zealand. He is listed as Australia's 97th representative on the Australian Rugby League's Kangaroo register.

His international rugby league debut against New Zealand in Wellington on 23 August 1919 alongside Clarrie Prentice saw them become Australia's 20th and 21st dual code rugby internationals. It wasn't until 18 years later that Doug McLean, Jr. would become the next Australian dual representative.

During the 1920 Great Britain Lions tour O'Donnell played a match for Queensland against the visiting Britons. He returned to Sydney for a final season with North Sydney in 1923 and was aged 37 when he finally retired at the end of that year.

== Sources ==
- Andrews, Malcolm (2006) The ABC of Rugby League, Austn Broadcasting Corpn, Sydney
- Whiticker, Alan & Hudson, Glen (2006) The Encyclopedia of Rugby League Players, Gavin Allen Publishing, Sydney
