= Terry Scurfield =

Australian rugby league footballer

Personal information
- Full name: Terry Scurfield

Playing information
- Position: Wing
Club
Years	Team	Pld	T	G	FG	P
1970–73	Parramatta	59	21	0	0	63
Representative
Years	Team	Pld	T	G	FG	P
1971	New South Wales	1	1	0	0	3
- Source: As of 23 May 2024

Terry Scurfield is an Australian former professional rugby league footballer who played in the 1970s. He played for Parramatta in the NSWRL competition.

== Playing career ==
Scurfield was originally from Parkes and began his first grade career with Parramatta in 1970 making his debut against Manly in round 15 scoring a try in Parramatta's 23–11 loss at Cumberland Oval. Scurfield spent another three years at Parramatta playing 59 games and scoring 21 tries. Scurfield represented New South Wales in game 3 of the 1971 Intestate series against Queensland scoring a try. He also represented Western Division and Country Seconds.
