= Trevor Ryan =

Australian rugby league footballer (1954–2026)

Personal information
- Full name: Trevor Michael Ryan
- Born: 4 May 1954 Bellingen, New South Wales, Australia
- Died: 10 October 2026 (aged 72) Sydney, New South Wales, Australia

Playing information
- Position: Lock, Second-row, Centre
Club
Years	Team	Pld	T	G	FG	P
1972–78	Balmain	136	25	1	0	77
1979–80	Newtown	35	4	0	0	12
1981	Western Suburbs	2	0	0	0	0
1982	Balmain	23	5	0	0	15
	Total	196	34	1	0	104
Representative
Years	Team	Pld	T	G	FG	P
1978	New South Wales	1	0	0	0	0
1976	NSW City	1	0	0	0	0
- Source: As of 16 May 2019
- Relatives: George Smith (uncle)

Trevor Michael Ryan (4 May 1954 – 10 October 2026) was an Australian rugby league footballer who played in the 1970s and 1980s. He played for Balmain, Western Suburbs and Newtown in the New South Wales Rugby League (NSWRL) competition. Ryan was the father of Matt Ryan who played for Parramatta between 2012 and 2013.

== Background ==
Ryan was born in Bellingen, New South Wales but grew up in Nambucca Heads. Ryan signed for Balmain as a 17 year old after being scouted by both Western Suburbs and Newtown.

== Playing career ==
Ryan was still 17 when he made his first grade debut for Balmain against Western Suburbs at the Sydney Sports Ground in 1972, Balmain winning 15–11.

In his first few seasons at Balmain, the club struggled on the field and claimed the wooden spoon in 1974. In 1975, Ryan was appointed the captain of the Balmain club. In 1976, Ryan earned his first representative honour being selected to represent NSW City.

In 1977, Balmain reached the finals series for the first time in a number of years after finishing fourth. Balmain would reach the semi-final but were defeated by Eastern Suburbs 26–2 at the Sydney Cricket Ground. In 1978, Ryan played for New South Wales against Queensland, starting in the second row as NSW finished the series 3-0. Ryan departed the club at the end of 1978 after being persuaded by John Singleton to sign with Newtown.

In his two seasons at Newtown, Ryan became a regular in the team but the club failed to reach the finals on both occasions. In 1981, Ryan departed Newtown and signed with Western Suburbs. Ryan only played in two first grade matches for Western Suburbs due to a hamstring injury. Ryan returned towards the end of the season and played in the club's reserve grade side which won the premiership against Parramatta.

In 1982, Ryan returned to Balmain and was appointed captain by coach Frank Stanton. Ryan retired following the conclusion of the 1982 season.

== Death ==
Ryan died from lung cancer on 10 October 2026, at the age of 72.
