= George Smith (rugby league, born 1930) =

Australia international rugby league player

Personal information
- Born: 30 September 1930
- Died: 23 January 2014 (aged 83)

Playing information
- Position: Lock, Prop, Second-row
Club
Years	Team	Pld	T	G	FG	P
1964–65	Manly Warringah	22	1	0	0	3
Representative
Years	Team	Pld	T	G	FG	P
1962	New South Wales	5	0	0	0	0
1962	Australia	1	0	0	0	0
- Relatives: Trevor Ryan (nephew)

George Smith (30 September 1930 – 23 January 2014) was an Australian rugby league player.

Smith was the son of a greyhound breeder and grew up in the Nambucca Valley. He played some of his early rugby league for Glenreagh and gained his representative appearances while with Lithgow.

A forward, Smith represented Australia in the 2nd Test against Great Britain at Lang Park in 1962, deputising injured lock Johnny Raper. He spent the 1963 season coaching Narrandera, then had two years as a prop/second rower with Manly Warringah, where he at times served as club captain.
