= Bill McCarthy (rugby league) =

Australian rugby league footballer

Personal information
- Full name: William Joseph McCarthy
- Born: 1885; Ashfield, New South Wales, Australia
- Died: 16 January 1958 (aged 72–73)

Playing information
- Position: Wing, Centre
Club
| Years | Team | Pld | T | G | FG | P |
|---|---|---|---|---|---|---|
| 1908–10 | North Sydney | 16 | 8 | 1 | 2 | 30 |
Representative
| Years | Team | Pld | T | G | FG | P |
| 1908 | New South Wales | 1 | 0 | 0 | 0 | 0 |
| 1908 | Metropolis | 1 | 0 | 0 | 0 | 0 |
- Source: As of 21 June 2019

Bill McCarthy was an Australian rugby league footballer who played in the 1900s and 1910s. He played for North Sydney in the NSWRL competition and was a foundation player of the club.

== Playing career ==
McCarthy played in North Sydney's first ever game against South Sydney on 20 April 1908 at Birchgrove Oval. McCarthy finished as the club's top try scorer with 5 tries in their inaugural season.

McCarthy also represented both Metropolis and New South Wales in 1908.

McCarthy played with Norths up until the end of the 1910 season before retiring.
