= Owen O'Donnell =

Australian rugby league footballer

Personal information
- Full name: Owen Gregory O'Donnell
- Born: 8 September 1950 (age 74); Wellington, New South Wales, Australia

Playing information
- Position: Centre
Club
Years	Team	Pld	T	G	FG	P
1970–73	North Sydney	60	20	45	0	150
1974–75	South Sydney	27	10	0	0	30
1976	St. George	15	3	0	0	15
	Total	102	33	45	0	195
Representative
Years	Team	Pld	T	G	FG	P
1970	New South Wales	1	0	0	0	0

Owen O'Donnell is an Australian former rugby league footballer who played in the 1970s. He played in the NSWRFL premiership for North Sydney, South Sydney and the St. George Dragons.

== Playing career ==
O'Donnell made his first-grade debut with North Sydney in 1970. He concluded the season as the club's top point scorer and was subsequently selected to represent New South Wales in the interstate series against Queensland. During his four-year tenure with the club, O'Donnell played in 60 games, although the team never qualified for the finals during this period.

In 1974, O'Donnell signed with South Sydney and participated in his first finals series that year, with Souths finishing fourth on the table. Souths were eliminated in the first week by Western Suburbs, with O'Donnell playing at centre. In his second year with the club, Souths finished at the bottom of the table, earning the wooden spoon.

In 1976, O'Donnell moved to St George and played one season for the club. St George finished 3rd that year and qualified for the finals. O'Donnell played on the wing in St George's 31–6 loss against Parramatta. This would be O'Donnell's last game in first grade and he retired at the end of the year.
