= Bill Paten =

Australian rugby league footballer

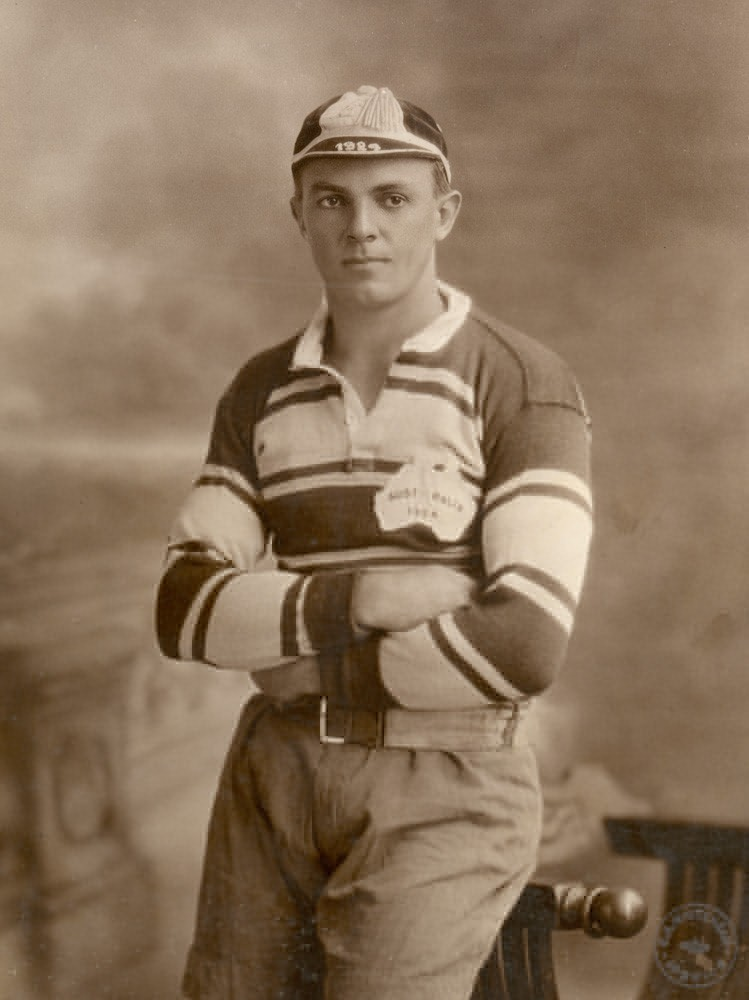

Personal information
- Full name: Walter Arnet Paten
- Born: 2 September 1896 Ipswich, QLD, Australia
- Died: 20 June 1991 (aged 94)

Playing information
- Position: Wing
Representative
Years	Team	Pld	T	G	FG	P
1918–28	Queensland	41	30	32	0	154
1919, 1924	Australia	2	1	0	0	3

Walter Arnet Paten (2 September 1896 – 20 June 1991) was an Australian rugby league footballer.

== Biography ==
A winger, Paten was a good all–round player, equally at home in attack and defence. He spent most of his career playing in his native Ipswich and was a regular fixture in the Queensland side for over a decade.

Paten represented Queensland from 1918 to 1928. He was in the first Queensland team to register a win over New South Wales and helped them to eight consecutive victories over their rival state in the early 1920s.

The third Ipswich product to play for Australia, Paten made his international debut in 1919 against New Zealand in Christchurch. His second and final cap came much later, in 1924 against Great Britain at the Brisbane Exhibition Ground, with his try helping secure a 21–11 win.

Paten was later a coach and judiciary member in Mackay and has the Mackay & District Rugby League award for the best and fairest player named after him, to recognise a 50–year contribution to rugby league in the city.

== See also ==
- List of Australia national rugby league team players
