= Abe Hall =

Australian rugby league footballer (1912–1950)

Personal information
- Born: 25 August 1912 Young, New South Wales, Australia
- Died: 18 April 1950 (aged 37) Grenfell, New South Wales, Australia

Playing information
- Position: Centre
Club
Years	Team	Pld	T	G	FG	P
1943	Balmain Tigers	4	0	2	0	4
Representative
Years	Team	Pld	T	G	FG	P
1932	New South Wales	2	0	2	0	4

Abe Hall (25 August 1912 – 18 April 1950) was an Australian rugby league footballer.

Born in Young, Hall grew up in a large family as one of 13 siblings. The family was active in the local sporting scene and at one point comprised the entire cricket XI for the Wambanumba team in Young. He was one of seven members of the family to play rugby league in the Maher Cup, making his own debut at age 16.

Hall, who was primarily a centre, gained representative honours for New South Wales in 1932 and in the same year served as a Kangaroos reserve for an SCG test match against the touring Great British side. He had a brief stint with the Balmain Tigers late in the 1943 NSWRFL season, at the advanced age of 30, and amongst his four first–grade appearances were two finals matches.

In 1950, Hall died in a workplace accident while cleaning a petrol tank at a depot in Grenfell, after suffocating on fumes when his protective mask malfunctioned.
