= Denis Cubis =

Australian rugby league footballer

Personal information
- Full name: Denis Cubis

Playing information
- Position: Centre
Club
Years	Team	Pld	T	G	FG	P
1962–70	North Sydney	95	28	0	0	84
Representative
Years	Team	Pld	T	G	FG	P
1965	New South Wales	1	1	0	0	3
1965	NSW City	1	1	0	0	3

Denis Cubis is an Australian former rugby league footballer who played in the 1960s and 1970s. He played for North Sydney in the New South Wales Rugby League (NSWRL) competition.

== Playing career ==
Cubis made his first grade debut for North Sydney in 1962. At the end of the 1962 season, North Sydney finished in second last place on the table above last placed South Sydney. In 1964, North Sydney qualified for the finals after finishing in 4th place. The club were defeated in the semi-final by Balmain at the Sydney Cricket Ground with Cubis missing the game through injury.

In 1965, Cubis and Norths enjoyed one of their best seasons. Cubis represented both New South Wales and New South Wales City teams. North Sydney finished in second place at the end of the 1965 season but lost both finals matches against St. George and South Sydney.

Cubis played with North Sydney until the end of 1970 before retiring. The club was unable to build off the 1965 season and failed to qualify for the finals in his last 5 years with the team.
