= Wally Hancock =

Australian rugby league footballer

Personal information
- Full name: Walter Joseph Hancock
- Born: 5 May 1897; Sydney, New South Wales, Australia
- Died: 23 June 1965 (aged 68)

Playing information
- Position: Second-row, Lock
Club
| Years | Team | Pld | T | G | FG | P |
|---|---|---|---|---|---|---|
| 1922–26 | North Sydney | 30 | 2 | 0 | 0 | 6 |

Wally Hancock was an Australian rugby league footballer who played in the 1920s. He played in the NSWRFL premiership for North Sydney as a lock and also as a second rower.

== Playing career ==
Hancock began his first grade career with Norths in 1922 and was a part of North Sydney's second premiership win playing at lock in their 35-3 1922 grand final victory over Glebe at the Sydney Cricket Ground.

Hancock played a further 4 seasons before retiring at the end of the 1926 season.
