= Ted Taplin =

Australian rugby league footballer

Personal information
- Full name: Edwin Raymond Taplin
- Born: 31 December 1893 Camden, New South Wales, Australia
- Died: 25 January 1968 (aged 74)

Playing information
- Position: Fullback
Club
Years	Team	Pld	T	G	FG	P
1912–22	North Sydney	123	7	3	0	27
Representative
Years	Team	Pld	T	G	FG	P
1919–21	New South Wales	3	0	0	0	0

Ted Taplin was an Australian rugby league footballer who played in the 1910s and 1920s. He played in the NSWRFL premiership for North Sydney as a fullback.

== Playing career ==
Taplin began his first grade career in 1912 and was a member of the North Sydney side which won their maiden premiership in 1921.

Taplin played on in 1922 but only made 4 appearances and was not included in the 1922 grand final winning side. Taplin also played representative football for New South Wales on 3 occasions and represented Tamworth and Orange in country rugby league.
