= Dallas Hodgins =

Australian rugby league footballer

Personal information
- Full name: Roderick Dallas Hodgins
- Born: 1898 Taree, New South Wales, Australia
- Died: 21 July 1959 (aged 60–61) Chatswood, New South Wales, Australia

Playing information
- Position: Five-eighth
Club
| Years | Team | Pld | T | G | FG | P |
|---|---|---|---|---|---|---|
| 1920–23 | North Sydney | 47 | 5 | 34 | 0 | 83 |
Representative
| Years | Team | Pld | T | G | FG | P |
| 1921–22 | New South Wales | 3 | 1 | 0 | 0 | 3 |
| 1922 | Metropolis | 3 | 1 | 3 | 0 | 9 |

Roderick Dallas Hodgins (1898–1959) was an Australian rugby league footballer who played in the 1920s.

== Playing career ==
Remembered as a five-eighth, Dallas Hodgins played four seasons with North Sydney between 1920 and 1923, He won two premierships with North Sydney during the club's golden era of 1921 and 1922.

He also represented New South Wales on three occasions between 1921 and 1922, and was very unlucky not to have toured with the 1921/22 Kangaroos.

== Death ==
Hodgins died at Chatswood, New South Wales on 21 July 1959.
