= Ted Dawson (rugby league) =

Australian rugby league footballer and administrator (1923–2019)

Personal information
- Full name: James Edward Dawson
- Born: 1923 Newcastle, New South Wales
- Died: 27 October 2019 (aged 96) Edgeworth, New South Wales, Australia

Playing information
- Position: Hooker
Club
Years	Team	Pld	T	G	FG	P
1951	St. George	11	2	0	0	6
Representative
Years	Team	Pld	T	G	FG	P
1949	New South Wales	1	0	0	0	0
1949–50	NSW Country	2	1	0	0	3

James Edward Dawson (1923 – 27 October 2019) was an Australian rugby league footballer who played in the 1940s and 1950s.

== A lifetime in rugby league ==
One old man's long life in Rugby League was rewarded when 94 year old Ted Dawson of Waratah-Mayfield was asked to present trophy awards to the Waratah-Mayfield Cheetahs players for winning their division in 2017. Ted's long life with the Waratah-Mayfield Rugby League Club started as a 12 year old schoolboy during the great depression years in 1935. At that time Ted was selected to represent NSW schools on a one-month tour of Queensland but had to provide 6 Pounds towards the cost. This amount could not be afforded by his family but the Waratah-Mayfield Rugby League District Club heard of Ted's plight & took the hat around. Ted was able to make the tour & that gesture from the club has never been forgotten.

Ted's long Service to the club there after are as follows: 1935 State-NSW V Queensland aged 12 years, 1942 Waratah-Mayfield 19 years, 1944 Waratah-Mayfield 21 years, 1947 NSW Country v City 24 years, 1948 NSW Country v City 25 years, 1948 NSW Country V New Zealand 25 years, 1948 Newcastle v New Zealand 25 years, 1948 Newcastle v Queensland 25 years, 1949 NSW Country v City 26 years, 1949 New South Wales v Queensland 26 years, 1950 Bigga-Canberra Area Player Coach 27 years, 1950 Country Monaro v England 27 years, 1950 NSW Country v City aged 27 years.

== St. George ==
In 1951, Dawson transferred to St. George as a possible replacement for Frank Facer, who had recently retired from playing. After completing one season, Dawson was forced to retire due to a rib cartilage continuous problem aged 28 years.

Dawson returned to Newcastle and was approached by Waratah to coach in 1952. After a number of years coaching joined the administration of the club & later on as Director of Newcastle Rugby League.

== Accolades ==
LIFE MEMBERSHIP's: 1. Waratah Mayfield Junior & Senior Bodies 2. Newcastle Rugby League as Director.
