= Clarrie Prentice =

Australian rugby coach and footballer

Personal information
- Born: Clarence Warwick Prentice; 1 July 1891 Sydney, New South Wales
- Died: 10 March 1948 (aged 56) Concord, New South Wales

Playing information

Rugby union
- Position: prop
Club
Years	Team	Pld	T	G	FG	P
	Western Suburbs RFC
Representative
Years	Team	Pld	T	G	FG	P
1914	Wallabies	1	0	0	0	0

Rugby league
- Position: Hooker
Club
Years	Team	Pld	T	G	FG	P
1915–24	Western Suburbs	115	22	7	0	80
Representative
Years	Team	Pld	T	G	FG	P
1919–22	Australia	5	0	0	0	0
1919–24	New South Wales	9	4	0	0	12
1915–23	Metropolis	5	2	1	0	8

Coaching information
Club
Years	Team	Gms	W	D	L	W%
1927	Western Suburbs	17	9	0	8	53
- As of 21 May 2025
- Relatives: Ward Prentice (brother)

Clarence Warwick Prentice (1 July 1891 – 10 March 1948) was an Australian rugby union and rugby league footballer who represented his country at both sports - a dual-code rugby international. He is the younger brother of fellow Wests player Ward Prentice.

== Rugby union career ==
Prentice played rugby union with the Western Suburbs Rugby Club in Sydney and represented with the Wallabies as a prop in 1914 against the All Blacks.

== Rugby league career ==
In 1915 Clarrie, and his brother Archie, joined the Western Suburbs Rugby League Club.

His international rugby league debut against New Zealand in Wellington on 23 August 1919, alongside Claud O'Donnell saw them become Australia's 20th and 21st dual code rugby internationals. It wasn't until 18 years later that Doug McLean jnr would become the next Australian dual representative.

Prentice was selected on the 1921–22 Kangaroo tour of Great Britain. He played in all three Tests of the tour and in 22 other tour matches for Australia.

He coached Western Suburbs in the 1927 NSWRFL season.

== Sources ==
- Whiticker, Alan (2004) Captaining the Kangaroos, New Holland, Sydney
- Andrews, Malcolm (2006) The ABC of Rugby League, Aust'n Broadcasting Corp, Sydney
