= Dick Townsend =

Australian rugby league footballer

Personal information
- Full name: Richard Townsend
- Born: 9 February 1890; Newtown, New South Wales, Australia
- Died: 17 August 1973 (aged 83); Kogarah, New South Wales, Australia

Playing information
- Position: Second-row, Lock
Club
Years	Team	Pld	T	G	FG	P
1913–23	Newtown	97	25	0	0	75
Representative
Years	Team	Pld	T	G	FG	P
1919	Australia	2	0	0	0	0
1920–21	New South Wales	3	0	0	0	0
- Source: As of 12 February 2019

Dick Townsend (1890–1973) was an Australian rugby league footballer who played in the 1910s and 1920s for Newtown in the NSWRL competition.

== Playing career ==
Townsend began his playing career in 1908, the first season of rugby league in Australia but it was not until 1913 that he made his first grade debut for Newtown. Townsend played in the Newtown sides which finished runners up in 1913 and 1914.

In 1919, Townsend was selected to play for Australia and featured in 2 matches against New Zealand. In 1920 and 1921, Townsend was selected to play for New South Wales in the interstate series against Queensland.

Townsend remained loyal to Newtown and played with the club up until the end of 1923 before retiring.

Dick Townsend was a Life Member of the Newtown Jets.
