= Jack 'Junker' Robinson =

Australian rugby league footballer

Jack Robinson
Personal information
- Full name: Jack Robinson
- Born: 6 July 1892 Balmain, New South Wales, Australia
- Died: 7 January 1981 (aged 88) Balmain, New South Wales, Australia

Playing information
- Position: Wing, Centre
Club
Years	Team	Pld	T	G	FG	P
1912–25	Balmain	161	75	3	0	232
Representative
Years	Team	Pld	T	G	FG	P
1919–23	New South Wales	5	4	0	0	12
1919–20	Australia	5	3	0	0	9
1914–23	Metropolis	5	4	0	0	12
- Relatives: George Robinson (brother)

Jack 'Junker' Robinson (1892-1981) was an Australian rugby league footballer who played in the 1910s and 1920s who achieved representative selection for his country.

== Playing career ==
Robinson began his first grade career at Balmain in 1912 as a seventeen-year-old and earned the nickname 'Junker'. No one knew it at the time, but he went on to play fourteen first grade seasons for Balmain between 1912-1925 and is remembered as one of their longest serving players in any subsequent era. He won six premierships with Balmain in 1915, 1916, 1917, 1919, 1920 and 1924 (although he did not play in the match). He also represented New South Wales on five occasions between 1919-1921 and 1923. He gained Australian selection in 1919 and toured New Zealand with the Kangaroos, playing in all four test matches. He is listed on the Australian Players Register as Kangaroo No. 100. His only other test appearance was during the 1920 Great Britain Lions tour, when he played in the third Ashes test. He retired at the end of the 1925 season at the age of 33.

== Death ==
Robinson died on 7 January 1981 at Balmain Hospital, aged 89. He was survived by his wife, three children and seven grandchildren and two great-grandchildren.
