= John Kerwick =

Australian rugby league player

Personal information
- Full name: John Kerwick
- Born: 15 July 1893
- Died: Unknown

Playing information
- Position: Second-row, Hooker, Lock
Club
Years	Team	Pld	T	G	FG	P
1915–22	South Sydney	83	18	0	0	54
Representative
Years	Team	Pld	T	G	FG	P
1919	New South Wales	1	0	0	0	0

John Kerwick was an Australian rugby league footballer who played in the 1910s and 1920s. He played for South Sydney as a second rower, hooker and lock.

== Playing career ==
Kerwick made his debut for South Sydney in Round 1 of the 1915 NSWRL season against Glebe at the Sydney Cricket Ground. The following season, Kerwick played at hooker in the 1916 grand final defeat against Balmain which ended 5–3. The following season, Kerwick was a member of the Souths side which finished runners up in the competition. In 1918, Kerwick played 13 games as Souths claimed the premiership that year but were not required to play in a grand final to be declared premiers. In 1919, Kerwick was selected to play for New South Wales and played featured in one match against Queensland. In 1920, Souths again finished as runners up in the NSWRL competition with Kerwick making 12 appearances. Kerwick played 2 more seasons for Souths and retired at the end of 1922.
