= Felix Ryan =

Australian rugby league footballer

Personal information
- Full name: Felix Thomas Ryan
- Born: 2 July 1890; Sydney, New South Wales, Australia
- Died: 23 November 1963 (aged 73)

Playing information
- Position: Second-row, Prop
Club
Years	Team	Pld	T	G	FG	P
1913–23	Newtown	127	29	0	0	87
Representative
Years	Team	Pld	T	G	FG	P
1915–23	New South Wales	11	2	0	0	6
1919–22	Australia	4	1	0	0	3
- Source: As of 17 January 2025

Felix Thomas Ryan (1890–1963) was an Australian rugby league footballer who played in the 1910s and 1920s. He played for Newtown and represented New South Wales and Australia. He has been named as one of the greatest players in the history of the Newtown club.

== Background ==
Ryan was born in Sydney, New South Wales on 2 July 1890 to Thomas Felix Ryan (1861–1927) and Bridget Emma Ryan née Mulquinny (1863–1920).

== Playing career ==
Ryan played ten seasons for Newtown between 1914 and 1923. Learning the game with teammates such as Charles 'Boxer' Russell, Albert 'Ricketty' Johnston and Paddy McCue,

Ryan went on to captain the club and play for New South Wales on eight occasions, and Australia. He initially toured with the Australian side to New Zealand in 1919, and also toured with the 1921–22 Kangaroo tour of Great Britain, in which he played two tests. He is listed on The Australian Players Register as Kangaroo No. 101. He retired in 1923 having played over 120 games for Newtown.

Ryan died on 23 November 1963, aged 73.
