= Dick Vest =

Australia international rugby league footballer

Personal information
- Full name: Gregoria Richard Vecerina (born Vest)
- Born: 19 February 1897 Barmedman, New South Wales, Australia
- Died: 11 June 1974 (aged 77) Enfield, New South Wales, Australia

Playing information
- Position: Wing, Centre
Club
Years	Team	Pld	T	G	FG	P
1914–23	Western Suburbs	85	22	8	0	82
1924–??	Cootamundra
	Total	85	22	8	0	82
Representative
Years	Team	Pld	T	G	FG	P
1919–22	New South Wales	9	10	0	0	30
1919–22	Australia	7	4	0	0	12
1920–22	NSW City	2	4	1	0	14

Dick Vest (1897–1974) was an Australian rugby league footballer who played in the 1910s and 1920s . An Australian international and New South Wales interstate representative three-quarter back, he played in the New South Wales Rugby Football League Premiership for Sydney's Western Suburbs club.

== Playing career ==
The son of a subject of the Austro Hungarian Empire (from Draga, Rijeka in what is now Croatia) immigrant, Vest was born Gregorio Richard Vest (original father's name- Francesco Vecerina)in the country New South Wales town of Barmedman. Following the death of his father in a mine accident, Vest and his two older brothers were sent to a boys home in the Western Sydney suburb Westmead, playing junior rugby league for local club Parramatta. Vest commenced his New South Wales Rugby Football League Premiership first grade career with Western Suburbs in the 1914 NSWRFL season.

During the 1920 Great Britain Lions tour Vest played in all three Tests for Australia as they won the Ashes for the very first time. He was later selected to go on the 1921–22 Kangaroo tour of Great Britain. He played for West Wyalong and Barmedman in the Maher Cup.

== Death ==
Vest died at Enfield, New South Wales on 11 June 1974.
