= List of North Sydney Bears players =

This is a list of rugby league footballers who played first-grade for the North Sydney Bears in Australia's top-level domestic men's rugby-league club competition.

== First-grade players (1908–1999) ==
Club
No.	Name	Career	Appearances	Tries	Goals	Field goals	Points
1	Edward Boland	1908–1916	39	1	0	0	3
2	Albert Broomham	1908–1914	67	33	0	0	99
3	Leonard Coste	1908	4	0	0	0	0
4	Sid Deane	1908–1919	39	6	0	0	18
5	Jim Devereux	1908–1913	17	9	0	0	27
6	Harry Glanville	1908	3	0	0	0	0
7	Joe Kendall	1908–1910	21	2	0	0	6
8	Denis Lutge	1908	4	1	0	0	3
9	M Lyons	1908	3	0	0	0	0
10	J Mathieson	1908	4	3	0	0	9
11	Bill McCarthy	1908–1910	16	8	1	2	30
12	Fred Notting	1908–1909	11	4	0	0	12
13	Bill Whitfield	1908–1915	19	0	7	1	16
14	W Drummond	1908	1	1	0	0	3
15	Alfred Eckland	1908–1910	2	0	0	0	0
16	Lancelot Hansen	1908–1909	11	2	2	0	10
17	Andy Morton	1908–1912	20	2	17	2	42
18	Alfred Findlater	1908	3	0	0	0	0
19	A Welch	1908	1	0	0	0	0
20	Henry Cook	1908	1	0	0	0	0
21	Eric Glasson	1908–1909	5	1	0	0	3
22	Frank Courtney	1908–1909	4	1	0	0	3
23	C Golding	1908	1	0	0	0	0
24	Arthur Bollard	1908–1911	25	6	0	0	18
25	A Pike	1908	2	0	0	0	0
26	John Rochester	1908	4	4	0	0	12
27	Heathwood Curphey	1908	1	0	0	0	0
28	Herbert Odbert	1908	1	0	0	0	0
29	Archibald Sprouster	1908	1	0	0	0	0
30	S Banks	1909	4	2	0	0	6
31	C Mathieson	1909–1910	7	2	0	0	6
32	Selby McFarlane	1908–1914	75	13	20	0	79
33	S Peters	1909	1	0	0	0	0
34	W Pettiford	1909	1	0	0	0	0
35	Joe Hedge	1909–1912	5	2	0	0	6
36	R Montgomery	1909–1910	2	0	0	0	0
37	Williams	1909	9	1	0	0	3
38	C Bailey	1909–1910	1	0	0	0	0
39	A Dale	1909	3	2	1	0	8
40	J Delaney	1909	1	0	0	0	0
41	W Maher	1909	48	5	8	0	31
42	Aney Morris	1909–1913	21	8	1	0	26
43	C Sandow	1909	6	0	1	0	2
44	J Whitman	1909	3	0	0	0	0
45	J Huggins	1909	7	0	0	0	0
46	L McDougall	1909	1	0	0	0	0
47	Os Deane	1909–1919	122	20	4	0	68
48	S King	1909	6	1	0	0	3
49	A Adams	1909	1	0	0	0	0
50	A Stevens	1909	2	0	0	0	0
51	A Tipper	1909	1	0	0	0	0
52	Albert House	1909	2	0	4	0	8
53	G Smith	1909–1917	13	1	0	0	3
54	Glen Barclay	1910	6	0	0	0	0
55	H Broomham	1910	11	2	0	0	6
56	Tedda Courtney	1910	12	2	0	0	6
57	J McFarlane	1910–1911	5	1	0	0	3
58	Syd Marshall	1910–1911	13	1	8	0	19
59	Con Sullivan	1910–1916	71	8	0	0	24
60	Roy Warne	1910	5	0	0	0	0
61	Bill Daley	1910	7	0	1	0	2
62	A Muller	1910	10	0	0	0	0
63	G Shaller	1910	1	0	0	0	0
64	Conrad Byrne	1910	5	0	6	0	12
65	H Ferguson	1910–1912	17	2	0	0	6
66	J Dunlop	1910	3	0	0	0	0
67	C Morris	1910	2	0	0	0	0
68	Ed Fry	1910	1	0	0	0	0
69	J Patterson	1910	3	0	0	0	0
70	Donohoe	1910	1	0	0	0	0
71	A McFarlane	1910–1911	14	5	0	8	31
72	Middlemass	1910	1	0	0	0	0
73	E Anderson	1911–1919	22	2	0	0	6
74	J Bailey	1911–1912	17	0	0	0	0
75	Tom Berecry	1911–1914	17	9	0	0	27
76	Os Clutton	1911	1	0	0	0	0
77	Jim Davis	1911	11	1	1	0	5
78	N Greenwood	1911–1912	14	0	0	0	0
79	K McPhee	1911	9	0	0	0	0
80	M O'Sullivan	1911	3	1	0	0	3
81	Ernie Hucker	1911	10	4	0	0	12
82	Lal Deane	1911–1912	15	2	1	0	8
83	Jack Nielsen	1911–1912	7	1	0	0	3
84	Billy Mitchell	1911	5	1	0	0	3
85	Anthony Donnelly	1911–1914	9	2	0	0	6
86	Jim Gilmour	1911	1	0	0	0	0
87	W Kelly	1911–1912	3	1	0	0	3
88	W Donnelly	1911–1912	4	0	0	0	0
89	H Nicholls	1911	1	0	0	0	0
90	Jack Baker	1911–1913	21	5	0	0	15
91	Stan Lloyd	1911–1918	60	4	0	0	12
92	F Robson	1911	1	0	0	0	0
93	Jim Walsh	1912	10	1	2	0	7
94	M McFarlane	1912	11	2	12	0	30
95	W Mueller	1912	10	1	0	0	3
96	Reg Gosper	1912–1916	44	5	0	0	15
97	G Gray	1912–1918	6	8	0	0	16
98	George Green	1912–1922	111	13	0	0	39
99	Ted Taplin	1912–1922	123	7	3	0	27
100	B Wilkinson	1912–1914	26	6	0	0	18
101	Bill King	1912	1	0	0	0	0
102	J King	1912–1919	14	0	0	0	0
103	Albert Burge	1913	6	1	1	0	5
104	Ed Franks	1913–1914	12	2	3	0	12
105	Tom Moore	1913	6	0	3	0	6
106	W Thomas	1913	10	5	0	0	15
107	G King	1913	1	0	0	0	0
108	Joe Miller	1913	7	3	8	0	25
109	Charles Sherrett	1913–1919	31	9	35	0	97
110	Owen Sherrett	1913–1920	21	3	0	0	9
111	J McIntyre	1914–1915	24	1	0	0	3
112	John Scully	1914	9	0	0	0	0
113	George Wheatley	1914–1915	20	4	3	1	20
114	S Woodward	1914	14	1	0	0	4
115	B Miller	1914	1	0	0	0	0
116	H Nicholson	1914	5	0	0	0	0
117	Cec Blinkhorn	1914–1919, 1920–1923	91	79	5	0	247
118	R Leafe	1914	1	0	0	0	0
119	Reg Farnell	1915–1918, 1922–1923	63	5	7	0	29
120	Joe Murray	1915–1920	16	2	0	0	6
121	Albert Stenning	1915	3	0	0	0	0
122	Henry Stewart	1915–1917	14	1	8	0	19
123	John Woodward	1915	11	0	0	0	0
124	J Kenny	1915–1917	8	0	0	0	0
125	Wilbur May	1915, 1920	8	2	0	0	6
126	A Fraser	1915	10	0	0	0	0
127	George Whally	1915	4	0	0	0	0
128	J Tasker	1915	4	0	0	0	0
129	Bryan Berecry	1915–1919	2	0	0	0	0
130	Charles Hurlstone	1915–1917	8	0	0	0	0
131	P Rae	1915	2	0	0	0	0
132	J Butler	1915	6	0	0	0	0
133	Pat Carroll	1915	1	0	0	0	0
134	W Hancock	1915–1920	18	1	0	0	3
135	P Hyland	1915–1916	2	0	0	0	0
136	Small	1915	1	0	0	0	0
137	Thornby	1915	1	0	0	0	0
138	Con Twomey	1915–1918	17	1	0	0	3
139	Ted McIntyre	1916–1918	25	2	0	0	6
140	L Mayo	1916	11	2	4	0	14
141	Duncan Thompson	1916–1923	59	12	46	0	128
142	A Wickham	1916	3	0	3	0	6
143	E Mooney	1916	6	1	0	0	3
144	Jack McArthur	1916–1918	34	3	15	0	39
145	W Green	1916	2	0	0	0	0
146	W Clayton	1916	1	0	0	0	0
147	C Irish	1916	1	0	0	0	0
148	R Ide	1916–1919	16	1	0	0	3
149	Bill Archer	1917	7	0	0	0	0
150	J Brown	1917	13	1	0	0	3
151	George Bullock	1917–1919	12	1	0	0	3
152	J Robertson	1917	9	0	5	1	12
153	Ernie Tate	1917	14	1	0	0	3
154	Henry Waterhouse	1917–1927	61	0	0	0	0
155	C Emelhenz	1917–1918	11	4	0	0	12
156	Alf Budnick	1917	1	0	0	0	0
157	L Morris	1917–1919	19	2	0	0	6
158	Herman Peters	1917–1925	101	62	2	0	190
159	Skews	1917	1	0	0	0	0
160	Spargo	1917	1	1	0	0	3
161	R Bullock	1917	12	5	0	0	15
162	R Turner	1917	1	0	0	0	0
163	Bob Denham	1918–1919	19	2	3	0	12
164	Jim Dunworth	1918–1919, 1925	26	5	0	0	15
165	William Gourlay	1918–1919	11	1	0	0	3
166	L Miranda	1918	7	0	0	0	0
167	Ted Jones	1918–1920	25	4	13	0	38
168	Wal Murphy	1918–1920, 1924–1925	14	4	1	0	14
169	Robert Dunworth	1919	8	1	0	0	3
170	Alf Faull	1919–1927	89	18	1	0	56
171	H Spackman	1919	3	0	0	0	0
172	Jim Ward	1919–1920	13	1	21	0	45
173	Jack Greenwood	1919	8	0	0	0	0
174	W Johnson	1919	2	1	0	0	3
175	Vince Edwards	1919–1922	4	0	0	0	0
176	C Finch	1919	1	0	0	0	0
177	Dave Garlick	1919	1	0	0	0	0
178	J Hannam	1919	2	0	0	0	0
179	Harry Maunder	1919	7	0	0	0	0
180	J Callaghan	1919	1	0	4	0	8
181	G Claremont	1919	1	0	0	0	0
182	C Hughes	1919	1	0	0	0	0
183	Eric Cuneo	1920	6	0	0	0	0
184	Harold Horder	1920–1923	50	50	73	0	296
185	George Horsey	1920–1921	11	2	0	0	6
186	Clarrie Ives	1920–1924	54	14	6	0	54
187	Henry Pidcock	1920	8	1	0	0	3
188	Jim Pye	1920–1923	47	8	0	0	24
189	R Bradley	1920	5	1	0	0	3
190	Dallas Hodgins	1920–1923	45	6	33	0	84
191	Frank Rule	1920–1927	78	11	0	0	33
192	Chris McGrath	1920–1923	30	6	0	0	18
193	Jack Baker	1921–1923	32	3	0	0	9
194	Alexander Buckle	1921	1	0	0	0	0
195	Wally Hancock	1922–1926	30	2	0	0	6
196	Norm Proctor	1922–1924	21	2	1	0	8
197	John Campbell	1922	1	0	0	0	0
198	G Johnson	1923	1	0	0	0	3
199	Claud O'Donnell	1923	11	0	0	0	0
200	Rex Hook	1923–1925	10	1	0	0	3
201	F Chevell	1923	6	0	0	0	0
202	R Loder	1923–1925	4	0	0	0	0
203	Alan Steele	1923–1925	26	6	0	0	18
204	W Warner	1923	1	0	3	0	6
205	Leo O'Connor	1923–1929	44	7	0	0	21
206	Jack Courtney	1923–1931	83	23	112	0	293
207	R Horne	1923	1	0	0	0	0
208	C Staunton	1923	1	0	0	0	0
209	William Coltman	1923	1	0	0	0	0
210	Os Reid	1923–1926	28	4	0	0	12
211	Wal Faull	1924–1925	18	5	1	0	17
212	Harold Johnson	1924–1928	11	2	0	0	6
213	Vince Olivera	1924	8	0	0	0	0
214	E Long	1924–1925	14	1	0	0	3
215	F Wilson	1924	1	0	0	0	0
216	Jimmy Johnson	1925–1930	62	6	1	0	20
217	A Berecry	1925–1927	28	3	0	0	9
218	M O'Brien	1925	2	0	0	0	0
219	Carl Arneman	1925–1930	48	12	0	0	36
220	George Sewell	1925–1929	52	21	0	0	63
221	R Henry	1925–1927	12	10	13	0	56
222	R Hogan	1925	2	0	0	0	0
223	W Foster	1925	1	0	0	0	0
224	C Carroll	1926	3	1	0	0	3
225	G Wunsch	1926–1927	19	1	0	0	3
226	Cecil Johnson	1926–1930	64	11	0	0	33
227	Eric Hogan	1926–1927	15	6	0	0	18
228	Joe Montgomery	1926–1930	52	11	0	0	33
229	H McQuarrie	1926–1928	4	0	0	0	0
230	Jack Sprouster	1926–1930	25	1	0	0	3
231	C McQuarrie	1926–1932	51	1	0	0	3
232	Clem Hill	1926	2	0	0	0	0
233	Leo McGrath	1926–1929	37	6	0	0	18
234	C Nash	1926–1929	3	0	0	0	0
235	Jack O'Reilly	1926–1930	6	0	0	0	0
236	C Woods	1927	1	0	0	0	3
237	Jack Costa	1927–1932	44	4	0	0	12
238	William Humphries	1927–1932	64	8	0	0	24
239	J Huntsman	1927	1	0	0	0	0
240	L Hill	1927–1930	6	0	0	0	0
241	Neil Reynolds	1927–1929	18	2	0	0	6
242	W Cavanagh	1927–1930	11	2	0	0	6
243	R McFadden	1927	1	0	0	0	0
244	Harry Mulheron	1927–1928	13	11	1	0	35
245	George Wilson	1927–1929	9	3	0	0	9
246	Les Carroll	1927–1933	68	6	120	0	258
247	B Mundy	1927–1929	9	2	0	0	6
248	F Maher	1928	2	0	0	0	0
249	H McQuarrie	1928	1	0	0	0	0
250	Jimmy Page	1928–1933	21	8	4	0	32
251	J Battersby	1928	4	0	0	0	0
252	Claude Blundell	1928–1930	16	5	0	0	15
253	Ken Wood	1928–1934	68	15	0	0	45
254	T Murray	1928–1930	7	1	0	0	3
255	Jack Kelly	1929	10	1	0	0	3
256	E Storier	1929	6	0	0	0	0
257	J West	1929	9	2	0	0	6
258	W Hagney	1929–1930	16	7	0	0	21
259	A Miller	1929	2	2	0	0	6
260	D Medina	1929	2	0	0	0	0
261	Bill Johnson	1929	4	0	0	0	0
262	G Roach	1929	4	1	0	0	3
263	Joe Baird	1930–1932	28	5	0	0	15
264	Jack Savage	1930–1933	10	1	0	0	3
265	J Black	1930	1	0	0	0	0
266	Artie Carnell	1930	6	0	0	0	0
267	Grantley Bennett	1930–1941	121	39	0	0	117
268	Harold Jones	1930–1931	17	5	0	0	15
269	J Floyd	1930	4	1	0	0	3
270	Charles Edward (Ted) Pickrang	1930	2	0	0	0	0
271	W Fairhall	1930	1	0	0	0	0
272	N McKenzie	1930–1937	13	3	0	0	9
273	T Beaumont	1931-1934	13	3	0	0	9
274	J Clayton	1931	5	0	0	0	0
275	Howard Crowley	1931	13	2	0	0	6
276	William Hanley	1931–1933	19	1	0	0	3
277	Cecil Jones	1931	1	0	0	0	0
278	Tom Wright	1931	14	4	1	0	14
279	Ron Eaton	1931–1934	32	6	0	0	18
280	W Anderson	1931	2	0	0	0	0
281	V Beaumont	1931–1934	27	5	0	0	15
282	J Groves	1931–1940	10	2	0	0	6
283	Lett Shepherd	1931–1934	28	5	0	0	15
284	R Lundie	1931–1932	8	1	0	0	3
285	H Bartley	1932	6	0	0	0	0
286	J Campbell	1932–1934	15	1	0	0	3
287	B Clifford	1932–1933	10	1	0	0	3
288	Bill Leckie	1932	14	4	29	0	70
289	Noel Walpole	1932–1933	18	6	0	0	18
290	Jimmy Duncan	1932	11	1	1	0	5
291	J McNeill	1932	4	1	0	0	3
292	K Small	1932–1934	10	0	0	0	0
293	Doug Deitz	1932–1945	81	10	80	0	190
294	Vic Hill	1932	6	0	0	0	0
295	B Bourke	1932	3	0	0	0	0
296	Stan Ridgway	1932–1944	85	2	33	0	72
297	Bill Davoran	1932	2	0	0	0	0
298	Alf Birtles	1933–1937	50	31	1	0	95
299	Arthur Edwards	1933	6	0	0	0	0
300	Gerald Fitzpatrick	1933	1	0	0	0	0
301	A Lyons	1933–1936	27	0	0	0	0
302	Ken Sherwood	1933	5	1	0	0	3
303	George Williams	1933	14	2	0	0	6
304	Wally Hamill	1933	13	1	5	0	13
305	Walter Kelleway	1933–1934	11	3	0	0	9
306	Fred Nolan	1933–1937	56	4	0	0	12
307	Chris Scheimer	1933–1935	26	1	13	0	29
308	Frank Loughrey	1933–1935	3	0	0	0	0
309	Cec Bennett	1933	8	1	0	0	3
310	Eric Bennett	1933–1937	36	9	0	0	37
311	Harry Allwork	1933–1934	16	2	0	0	6
312	Frank McGuren	1933–1934	6	1	0	0	3
313	Ron Hyde	1933–1937	10	1	1	0	5
314	Ray Gillam	1934–1935	31	8	0	0	24
315	Ron Luscombe	1934	5	0	0	0	0
316	Rex Harrison	1934–1946	126	38	68	0	250
317	Jim Flower	1934	11	0	0	0	0
318	Gordon Fletcher	1934	5	1	0	0	3
319	Noel Ferrier	1934–1936	29	3	0	0	9
320	Harry Forbes	1934–1939	15	3	0	0	9
321	Johnny Abel	1935–1936	24	7	1	0	23
322	Bob Izzard	1935	5	2	0	0	6
323	W O'Toole	1935	4	0	0	0	0
324	Roy Thompson	1935–1942	63	11	153	0	339
325	Bill Brewer	1935–1939	51	3	0	0	9
326	L Harrington	1935	1	3	0	0	9
327	Jack McDonough	1935–1937	11	0	0	0	0
328	E Stanwell	1935	2	0	0	0	0
329	Arch Crippin	1936–1939	15	12	2	0	40
330	Sid Harmer	1936–1941	56	5	0	0	15
331	Clarrie Mitchelson	1936	6	0	0	0	0
332	C Ward	1936	1	0	0	0	0
333	Jackie Fisher	1936-1939	18	5	0	0	15
334	Fred Dhu	1936–1945	76	41	0	0	123
335	J Kirby	1936–1939	19	1	0	0	3
336	Harry McKinnon	1936–1945	127	7	0	0	21
337	Laurie Ward	1937	8	1	0	0	4
338	Eddie Finucane	1937	2	0	0	0	0
339	Sid Morris	1937–1941	8	0	0	0	0
340	Dick Allerton	1937–1942	41	4	0	0	12
341	Jack Cole	1938	8	0	0	0	0
342	C Comber	1938	7	1	0	0	3
343	Herb Dhu	1938–1942	27	9	0	0	27
344	Dave McErlane	1938–1939	18	7	0	0	21
345	Fred Bulger	1938–1940	14	0	0	0	0
346	Bruce McPhail	1938–1939	16	1	2	0	7
347	Leo Reilly	1938–1939	18	0	0	0	0
348	Roy Carroll	1938–1939	4	0	0	0	0
349	J Kerslake	1938	2	0	0	0	0
350	Cliff Pearce	1938–1940	5	0	3	0	6
351	D Haslett	1938	2	0	0	0	0
352	Pat Morgan	1938–1947	31	1	47	0	97
353	Jack Sullivan	1938–1941	30	9	10	0	47
354	J Pearson	1938	1	0	0	0	0
355	F Salmon	1938	4	0	0	0	0
356	Eric Neville	1938–1940	7	0	0	0	0
357	Jack Grubb	1939–1945	29	4	19	0	12
358	J Meyer	1939	5	0	0	0	0
359	Gerald Scully	1939–1946	81	31	0	0	93
360	Ron Buffett	1939–1941	13	0	2	0	4
361	Jack Balmain	1939	7	0	0	0	0
362	J Shea	1939	2	0	0	0	0
363	E Scully	1939–1941	10	0	0	0	0
364	John Morrissey	1939–1942	29	5	0	0	15
365	Neville Butler	1940–1943	13	0	10	0	20
366	Jim Kirkwood	1940	4	1	0	0	3
367	Jack McCarthy	1940–1941	14	2	0	0	6
368	Walter Worrad	1940	12	1	0	0	3
369	Frank Cottle	1940–1951	75	12	0	0	36
370	Alf Hall	1940	2	0	0	0	0
371	Gerry Atwell	1940	2	0	0	0	0
372	Keith Carroll	1940–1950	42	8	29	0	82
373	Lester Hough	1940	7	4	0	0	12
374	Johnny McLachlan	1940–1945	51	10	0	0	30
375	Jack Rubinson	1940–1941	16	0	0	0	0
376	Frank Facer	1940–1946	76	2	0	0	6
377	J Nolan	1940	1	0	0	0	0
378	Fred Bradstreet	1941	1	0	0	0	0
379	Athol Cairns	1941–1944	23	11	2	0	37
380	Jim Francis	1941–1942	8	1	0	0	3
381	Laurie Doran	1942–1946	61	5	13	0	41
382	Frank Hyde	1942–1944	37	9	0	0	27
383	Terry Edwards	1942–1949	22	4	0	0	12
384	Frank Collins Sr.	1942–1945	39	17	20	0	91
385	C Watson	1942	5	0	0	0	0
386	Frank Seaborn	1942–1945	3	1	0	0	3
387	Harry Taylor	1942–1946	25	6	3	0	24
388	Max Whitehead	1942–1946	13	1	0	0	2
389	H Bonser	1942	1	0	0	0	0
390	James Hall	1942–1945	27	6	0	0	18
391	Carl Langton	1942–1947	24	3	0	0	9
392	Ron Ainsworth	1943	17	6	0	0	18
393	Cyril McMahon	1943–1946	53	36	4	0	116
394	Ted Rudd	1943–1944	20	4	51	0	114
395	Don McKinnon	1943	9	0	0	0	0
396	Alf Gallagher	1944–1945	14	1	0	0	3
397	Eric Bathgate	1944–1945	4	3	0	0	6
398	Henry Bowers	1944	1	0	0	0	0
399	R Merriman	1944	2	1	0	0	3
400	Johnny Bliss	1944–1946	35	27	0	0	81
401	Ken Bennett	1944–1947	12	1	0	0	3
402	G Purdue	1944	2	0	0	0	0
403	Finley Brian	1944	2	1	0	0	3
404	George Atherden	1944	1	0	0	0	0
405	Bill McLean	1944–1946	19	4	0	0	12
406	Bert Collins	1945	2	1	0	0	2
407	R Pearson	1945	14	2	0	0	6
408	Bert Cowley	1945	1	1	2	0	7
409	Len Willan	1945–1949	51	8	0	0	24
410	Keith Kirkwood	1945–1946	9	1	0	0	3
411	M Ryan	1945–1946	7	0	0	0	0
412	Johnny Smith	1945–1946	12	5	0	0	15
413	G Carver	1945	1	0	0	0	0
414	Kurt Davies	1945–1948	14	6	0	0	18
415	Jack Niddrie	1946–1950	33	16	0	0	48
416	Jim Scoular	1946	12	4	0	0	12
417	J Lenehan	1946	1	0	0	0	0
418	Ray Black	1946	3	0	0	0	0
419	Vince Emery	1946–1952	52	19	0	0	57
420	Nevyl Hand	1946–1948	29	2	0	0	6
421	Ray Botham	1947	3	0	0	0	0
422	Joe Casey	1947–1954	35	3	0	0	9
423	Reg Cook	1947	5	2	0	0	6
424	Tommy Grogan	1947	13	4	0	0	12
425	Reg James	1947–1951	29	1	0	0	3
426	Tom Kirk	1947	14	0	2	0	4
427	Cec Waters	1947–1955	145	11	0	0	33
428	Harry Ryan	1947	10	2	0	0	6
429	Morry Mason	1947	10	2	0	0	6
430	Harvey Wort	1947–1948	21	3	0	0	9
431	M Hayes	1947	2	0	0	0	0
432	Reg Angus	1947–1948	8	1	1	0	5
433	Johnny Robin	1947–1951	21	6	8	0	34
434	Allan Lawson	1948–1950	18	0	24	0	48
435	Keith Middleton	1948–1954	90	21	0	0	63
436	Adrian Gleeson	1948	1	0	0	0	0
437	Alf Austin	1948–1949	23	6	0	0	18
438	Neville Gardner	1948	4	0	0	0	0
439	Erwin Noffz	1948–1951	26	2	0	0	6
440	Ormonde Small	1948–1949	11	3	0	0	9
441	Max Sullivan	1948	9	1	0	0	4
442	Walter O'Brien	1948	9	3	0	0	9
443	R Priest	1948–1949	15	0	0	0	0
444	Jack Plater	1948–1954	27	9	5	0	37
445	Harry Sykes	1948–1949	12	1	0	0	3
446	A Forbes	1948	6	2	0	0	6
447	Bill Middleton	1948–1952	31	2	44	1	96
448	D Morton	1948–1952	4	0	0	0	0
449	A Harley	1948	1	0	3	0	6
450	P Milgate	1948–1949	3	3	0	0	9
451	Jack Byrnes	1949	18	1	0	0	3
452	Ron Crossley	1949–1950	26	4	80	0	172
453	Graham Jones	1949	4	0	0	0	0
454	Jack Dickerson	1949–1951	24	10	0	0	10
455	Bob Sullivan	1949–1958	122	42	4	0	134
456	Peter O'Brien	1949–1955	103	77	1	0	231
457	Kevin Price	1949	14	2	0	0	6
458	Jack Bernhardt	1949	10	2	0	0	6
459	Norm Strong	1949–1962	210	10	0	0	30
460	G Yates	1949	3	1	0	0	3
461	K Stanford	1949	1	0	0	0	0
462	Alan Fitzgerald	1950–1953	50	7	0	0	21
463	Martin Gallagher	1950–1951	31	6	5	0	28
464	Lloyd Hudson	1950–1955	89	17	0	0	51
465	Colin Lay	1950–1956	77	8	0	0	24
466	Don Shearer	1950	1	0	0	0	0
467	Ray Thompson	1950–1953	8	1	0	0	4
468	Alan Arkey	1951–1958	90	1	343	2	689
469	Jack McClean	1951–1952	37	30	0	0	90
470	Jack O'Connell	1951	7	0	21	0	42
471	Austin Soorley	1951	5	1	0	0	3
472	Horrie Toole	1951–1960	121	67	0	0	201
473	Alan Cripps	1951	7	2	0	0	6
474	Ray Reeves	1951	2	0	0	0	0
475	Neville Massina	1951–1954	8	1	0	0	3
476	Cliff Slattery	1951	1	0	0	0	0
477	Peter Diversi	1952–1955	63	9	33	0	93
478	Don Evenden	1952–1958	123	23	0	0	69
479	Jim Gillon	1952–1958	56	11	2	0	37
480	Ben Haslam	1952–1954	55	26	0	0	78
481	George Martin	1952–1955	72	44	0	0	132
482	Tom Northcote	1952	1	0	0	0	0
483	Don Leydon	1952	1	0	0	0	0
484	Frank Foodey	1953	3	0	11	0	22
485	Norm Stewart	1953–1954	15	2	51	0	108
486	Kevin Kilduff	1953	2	2	0	0	6
487	Bob Gorman	1953	6	2	3	0	12
488	Jim Hand	1954	3	0	0	0	0
489	Arthur Clarke	1954	4	3	0	0	9
490	Ron de Costa	1954	2	0	0	0	0
491	Barry Jackson	1954–1956	19	6	0	0	18
492	Don Burge	1954–1956	20	10	0	0	30
493	E Hanson	1954	2	1	0	0	3
494	Neil Leydon	1954	2	0	0	0	0
495	Noel Mackay	1955	5	1	1	0	5
496	Tom Pierce	1955–1956	12	4	0	0	12
497	Norm Twight	1955–1957	8	3	0	0	9
498	Alf Madden	1955–1956	22	2	9	0	24
499	Barry Fraser	1955–1957	20	1	0	0	3
500	Jack Blinkhorn	1956–1959	61	0	0	0	0
501	Neville Brogan	1956	5	1	2	0	7
502	Bernie Cuneo	1956–1960	61	7	0	0	21
503	Clive Stephens	1956–1961	31	11	0	0	33
504	Trevor Allan	1956–1958	11	4	0	1	14
505	Bruce McDonald	1956	1	0	0	0	0
506	Alan Ferguson	1956	10	6	0	0	18
507	Ken Odgers	1956–1960	42	6	0	0	18
508	Harold Blinkhorn	1956–1962	74	5	0	0	15
509	Barney McEvoy	1956–1959	51	10	0	0	30
510	Terry Boland	1956	1	0	0	0	0
511	Chris Breen	1956	2	0	0	0	0
512	S Kennedy	1956	1	0	0	0	0
513	Ray Cardilini	1956–1958	25	13	0	0	39
514	Bob Dawson	1956–1957	15	0	0	0	0
515	Jack Fitzmaurice	1956	6	0	0	0	0
516	Noel Garland	1956–1957	10	4	0	0	12
517	Ken McCaffery	1957–1959	32	10	2	0	34
518	Bill Sandstrom	1957–1959	35	1	0	0	3
519	Graham Stewart	1957–1959	5	0	0	0	0
520	Paul Cuneo	1957–1962	77	21	0	0	63
521	Doug McKinnon	1957–1962	24	2	0	0	6
522	Jack Brown	1957–1962	60	9	0	0	27
523	Brian Carlson	1957–1962	72	31	211	0	515
524	Dave Holman	1958–1962	61	9	0	0	27
525	Bob Honeysett	1958–1959	30	15	0	0	45
526	Ken Irvine	1958–1970	176	171	59	1	633
527	Johnny Jones	1958–1959	28	1	62	0	127
528	John Kell	1958	16	0	0	0	0
529	Bob Cooley	1958	3	1	0	0	3
530	Ray Love	1958–1964	64	15	0	0	45
531	Don McPherson	1958	1	0	0	0	0
532	Greg Hawick	1959–1960	23	2	14	0	34
533	Ed May	1959–1966	55	4	0	0	12
534	John O'Brien	1959–1960	9	0	0	0	0
535	Billy Reinhold	1959	1	0	0	0	0
536	Bill Teasdell	1959–1962	13	0	0	0	0
537	Neville Wall	1959–1960	8	1	0	0	3
538	George Hunter	1960	17	2	0	0	6
539	Ted Bonser	1960	1	0	0	0	0
540	Mick Maher	1960–1970	125	23	0	0	69
541	Barry Hall	1960	2	2	0	0	6
542	Ron Potter	1960–1962	28	4	0	0	12
543	Don Lowth	1960	4	0	0	0	0
544	Sam Schofield	1960	4	0	0	0	0
545	Dave McLeod	1960–1962	13	0	36	0	72
546	John Elliott	1960–1961	4	0	0	0	0
547	Don Doak	1961–1967	79	2	0	0	6
548	Barry Levido	1961	15	1	0	0	3
549	John Pollard	1961–1963	17	5	0	0	15
550	Dale Puren	1961	9	2	0	0	6
551	Doug Blinkhorn	1961–1962	11	4	0	0	12
552	R Butlin	1961	1	0	0	0	0
553	Ron Baker	1961–1962	3	0	0	0	0
554	Mick Casey	1961–1962	10	2	0	0	6
555	P Hatton	1961	2	0	0	0	0
556	Bill Halstead	1961–1967	13	0	0	0	0
557	Eric Barnes	1962–1966	50	4	0	0	12
558	Bill Cane	1962–1968	41	2	6	8	18
559	Denis Cubis	1962–1970	95	28	0	0	84
560	Len Diett	1962–1966	48	7	0	0	21
561	John Gudgeon	1962–1967	87	13	0	0	39
562	Eric Sladden	1962–1967	84	56	0	0	168
563	Denis Burke	1962–1966	15	0	0	0	0
564	R O'Sullivan	1962	1	0	0	0	0
565	A Masula	1962	1	0	2	0	4
566	J Mooney	1962–1970	32	5	26	0	67
567	Merv Cross	1963	9	1	0	0	3
568	Ray Dawson	1963–1964	24	1	0	0	3
569	Roy Fisher	1963–1965	12	0	0	0	0
570	Fred Griffiths	1963–1966	68	8	283	0	590
571	Dinny O'Bryan	1963–1967	64	18	1	1	58
572	Billy Wilson	1963–1967	65	3	0	0	9
573	Ross Warner	1963–1974	186	14	0	0	42
574	Bob Hannon	1963–1964	10	0	0	0	0
575	Doug Walton	1963–1964	13	0	0	0	0
576	W Walters	1963	1	0	0	0	0
577	Tom Wilson	1963	2	0	0	0	0
578	John Ambrum	1964–1967	15	1	0	0	3
579	Colin Greenwood	1964–1968	77	24	0	0	72
580	Lloyd Weier	1964–1969	115	10	0	0	30
581	Peter Harrison	1964–1965	9	3	9	0	27
582	Frank Olson	1964–1966	15	5	0	0	15
583	Jeff Simmonds	1964–1965	6	2	0	0	6
584	Frank Scrivener	1964	2	0	0	0	0
585	Bob Camden	1965–1968	31	4	1	3	20
586	Paul Hancock	1965–1968	29	1	0	0	3
587	Peter Hanna	1965	7	0	0	0	0
588	John Floyd	1965	1	0	0	0	0
589	Geoff Meaney	1965	1	0	0	0	0
590	George Ambrum	1966–1974	157	54	0	1	164
591	Warren Chatfield	1966–1970	46	4	0	0	12
592	Eric Pitt	1966–1969	30	2	0	0	6
593	John Ingham	1966–1967	11	1	0	0	3
594	Doug Lamberth	1966–1967	6	0	2	0	4
595	Keith Russell	1966–1968	14	2	26	0	58
596	Harry Raven	1966	6	1	0	0	3
597	J Schroder	1966	1	0	0	0	0
598	Graham Willard	1966	2	1	0	0	3
599	Gary Banks	1967–1969	43	5	0	1	17
600	Merv Dent	1967	8	1	7	0	17
601	Thomas Smales	1967	6	0	0	3	6
602	John Sneddon	1967–1970	28	3	2	0	13
603	John Sullivan	1967–1970	28	2	0	0	6
604	Dave Wood	1967–1971	41	12	0	0	36
605	Noel Cavanagh	1968–1972	78	5	66	0	147
606	John Fairns	1968–1973	50	4	9	0	30
607	Danny Shearer	1968	8	1	14	0	31
608	John McDonell	1968–1972	100	15	0	2	49
609	Bob Lang	1968–1970	23	3	0	4	17
610	Brian Norton	1968–1970, 1975	45	3	0	0	9
611	Dick Harris	1968–1971	17	2	0	0	6
612	Bernie Plater	1968	5	1	0	0	3
613	Ray Beattie	1968	2	0	0	0	0
614	Warren Thompson	1968–1969	27	6	0	0	18
615	John Grew	1968–1971	6	1	0	0	3
616	John Miller	1968–1976	8	3	0	0	9
617	John Booby	1969–1972	36	4	76	1	166
618	Frank Collins Jr.	1969–1972	18	7	0	0	21
619	Warren Evans	1969–1972	16	1	0	0	3
620	Peter Jacques	1969–1971	16	1	0	0	3
621	Leo Toohey	1969–1971	36	7	0	0	21
622	Graham Williams	1969–1971	39	9	1	1	31
623	Kerry Collien	1970–1972	19	7	0	0	21
624	Barry Glasgow	1970–1973	32	2	61	1	129
625	Jim Mills	1970–1972	37	8	0	0	24
626	Mal McLachlan	1970–1978	92	27	0	0	81
627	Laurie Moraschi	1970–1972	38	7	0	0	21
628	Owen O'Donnell	1970–1973	60	20	45	0	150
629	Dave Bridgewater	1970–1971	11	1	0	0	3
630	Glen Whitney	1970–1973	28	1	0	0	3
631	Peter Mullins	1970	3	1	0	0	3
632	John Payne	1970–1972	19	1	0	0	3
633	Bob Doyle	1971–1972	8	1	0	0	3
634	Phil Franks	1971	10	4	0	0	12
635	Merv Hicks	1971–1972	19	1	0	0	3
636	Rex Murphy	1971–1977	79	3	0	0	9
637	Bruce Walker	1971–1978	140	36	0	0	108
638	Bruce Fitzpatrick	1971–1973	5	0	0	0	0
639	Ross Franklin	1971–1972	8	0	0	0	0
640	F Marshall	1971	1	0	0	0	0
641	George Varela	1971–1976	49	18	0	0	54
642	Brian Rowe	1971	1	0	0	0	0
643	Paul Wall	1971	1	0	0	0	0
644	Brian Anderson	1972–1974	40	3	0	0	9
645	Phil Bockos	1972	2	1	0	0	3
646	Grahame Forlonge	1972–1977	38	5	22	0	59
647	Peter Inskip	1972	22	3	62	1	134
648	Keith Outten	1972–1974	52	4	1	0	14
649	Tim Pickup	1972–1974	52	10	2	0	34
650	Gary Pretti	1972–1977	47	8	0	0	24
651	Joe Haney	1972	8	0	0	0	0
652	Michael McLean	1972	9	1	0	0	3
653	Phil Giersch	1972–1973	12	2	0	0	9
654	Tony Herring	1972	4	0	0	0	0
655	Ian Sheerin	1972	5	1	0	0	3
656	Terry Adams	1973–1979	73	16	0	0	48
657	Dave Cooper	1973	18	2	0	0	6
658	Bruce Foye	1973–1980	107	11	0	0	33
659	Eddie Heatley	1973–1974	27	1	0	0	3
660	Keith Harris	1973–1974, 1977–1983	155	20	9	1	89
661	Mick Healey	1973–1977, 1979	56	19	1	0	59
662	Derek Moritz	1973–1974	53	24	68	0	208
663	Steve Winter	1973	19	1	0	0	3
664	Peter Craig	1973–1981	38	18	0	0	54
665	Terry Douglas	1973	7	1	0	0	3
666	Bruce Warwick	1973–1974	25	7	62	0	145
667	Mick Bellew	1973	1	0	0	0	0
668	Paul Hope	1974–1977	74	28	0	0	84
669	Rodger Lavis	1974–1976	40	5	0	0	15
670	Dave Fraser	1974	1	1	0	0	3
671	Barry O'Shea	1974	1	0	0	0	0
672	Dave Burnet	1974–1975	18	0	2	0	4
673	Steve Colman	1974–1975	25	0	0	0	0
674	Henry Northey	1974	5	0	0	0	0
675	Brian Noonan	1974	1	0	0	0	0
676	Terry Wood	1974	1	0	0	0	0
677	Bill Hamilton	1975–1978	71	6	0	0	18
678	John Rawlins	1975–1976	24	5	0	0	15
679	Graeme Smith	1975–1978	25	10	0	0	30
680	Barry Wood	1975–1977	41	23	7	0	73
681	John Gray	1975–1977, 1981–1983	88	9	214	1	468
682	Nev Makin	1975–1977	23	2	0	0	6
683	Jim Fiddler	1975	12	1	24	2	53
684	Brendon Lindsay	1975	4	1	1	0	5
685	Mark Scobie	1975	15	2	0	0	6
686	Ron Harre	1975–1976	7	0	0	0	0
687	Geoff Murphy	1975–1978	12	0	0	0	0
688	John Aloe	1975	1	0	0	0	0
689	Trevor Richards	1975	1	0	0	0	0
690	John Long	1976–1979	40	3	0	0	9
691	Tim Murphy	1976	17	2	0	0	6
692	Mark Tonks	1976	9	2	10	0	26
693	Peter van Gulik	1976	11	2	0	0	6
694	Gordon West	1976–1979	56	14	0	0	42
695	Bryan Long	1976	7	0	0	0	0
696	Glen Boatswain	1976–1980	47	14	0	0	42
697	Marc Marinkovich	1976	1	0	0	0	0
698	Kevin Wilson	1976–1983	63	9	0	0	27
699	Graham Hayward	1976–1977	4	0	0	0	0
700	Jeff Shield	1977	7	0	0	0	0
701	Gary Frazier	1977–1979	4	0	0	0	0
702	John Adam	1977–1984	152	44	0	0	139
703	Don McKinnon	1977–1987	186	28	0	0	93
704	Ken Potter	1977–1980	5	0	0	0	0
705	Robin Sullivan	1977	1	0	0	0	0
706	Pat Cudmore	1977–1980	59	8	0	1	25
707	Aub Le Brocq	1977–1980	21	3	0	0	9
708	Paul Keogh	1977–1980	19	5	0	0	15
709	Chris Luckman	1977–1984	103	39	0	0	138
710	Russell Hunter	1978–1980	33	6	0	1	19
711	Pat Kelly	1978	13	0	0	0	0
712	Peter Schofield	1978–1979	38	7	64	0	149
713	Geoff Smith	1978–1979	10	2	0	0	6
714	John Vandenberg	1978–1980	36	10	0	0	30
715	Mark Snuggs	1978	1	0	0	0	0
716	Tony Quirk	1978	19	4	11	0	34
717	Jeff Simons	1978–1979	13	0	0	0	0
718	Lee Cooper	1978–1979	5	0	0	0	0
719	Lance Hore	1978–1981	3	1	0	0	3
720	Peter Brady	1978	5	1	0	0	3
721	Peter Mudd	1978	1	0	0	0	0
722	Brian Dunn	1979	9	1	0	0	3
723	Rod Henniker	1979–1981	52	6	132	1	283
724	Steve Mayoh	1979–1985	92	9	4	0	37
725	Paul McCaffrey	1979–1987	100	30	2	1	102
726	Keith Rugg	1979	7	2	0	0	6
727	Alan Sheppard	1979–1985	104	23	0	0	78
728	Paul McCabe	1979	14	0	0	0	0
729	Peter Ryan Jr.	1979	13	1	0	0	3
730	Alan Summers	1979	2	0	0	0	0
731	Tony Ashworth	1979	2	0	0	0	0
732	Peter Cross	1979–1986	91	4	0	0	15
733	Tony Springall	1979–1981	19	0	0	0	0
734	Mick Glascock	1979	4	2	0	0	8
735	Ian Bowler	1980	2	0	0	0	0
736	Mark Harris	1980–1981	33	5	3	0	21
737	Chris Montgomery	1980	3	1	0	0	3
738	Alan Smith	1980–1981	31	3	1	0	11
739	John O'Connor	1980–1982	14	0	2	0	4
740	Peter Parsons	1980–1983	15	3	7	0	25
741	Mick Tilse	1980	4	0	0	0	0
742	Simon Brockwell	1981–1987	104	26	0	0	87
743	Mark Graham	1981–1988	146	29	1	0	105
744	Peter McIntyre	1981–1982	6	2	0	0	6
745	Stan Jurd	1981–1982	34	0	0	0	0
746	Grant Boatswain	1981–1984	7	0	0	0	0
747	Alan Burns	1981–1985	93	24	0	0	84
748	Phil Ritchie	1981–1984	55	1	0	0	4
749	Fred Ah Kuoi	1981–1983	27	4	0	0	12
750	Max Wilkie	1981–1983	26	4	1	0	14
751	Bruce Burgess	1981–1983	5	0	0	0	0
752	Mitchell Cox	1982–1985	73	15	6	0	51
753	Andrew Simons	1982–1988	105	36	2	0	139
754	Glenn Worne	1982	1	0	0	0	0
755	Doug Rollerson	1982	3	0	3	0	6
756	Neigel Tait	1982–1988	71	11	0	0	41
757	Fred Teasdell	1983–1988	111	14	0	0	56
758	Garry Williams	1983	4	1	0	0	4
759	Lindsay Johnston	1983–1984	33	0	0	0	0
760	Laurie Spina	1983–1984	38	11	0	0	44
761	Stan Napa	1983	4	0	0	0	0
762	Darren Rodgers	1983–1984	22	6	0	0	24
763	Bill Heidke	1983–1984	4	0	0	0	0
764	Matthew Wurth	1983–1985	9	0	0	0	0
765	Errol Hillier	1983–1984	23	1	0	0	4
766	Graeme Jennings	1984–1985	24	4	5	0	26
767	Wayne Portlock	1984	12	2	25	0	58
768	Wayne Wigham	1984	8	3	0	0	12
769	Wayne Lonergan	1984	7	4	0	1	9
770	Col Murphy	1984	4	0	0	0	0
771	Ricky Walford	1984	12	8	21	0	74
772	Phil Langley	1984	3	0	0	0	0
773	Steve Casey	1984–1987	39	9	4	2	46
774	Bob Cooper	1984	4	0	0	0	0
775	Ashley Lindsay	1984–1987	9	0	0	0	0
776	Wayne Honeywood	1984–1985	19	1	0	0	4
777	Gary Dunbar	1984–1985	7	0	0	0	0
778	Peter Este	1984–1985	4	0	3	0	6
779	Greg Marr	1984	1	0	0	0	0
780	Brian Dennis	1985	1	0	0	0	0
781	Rex Wright	1985–1987	43	1	0	0	4
782	Cliff Lyons	1985	23	7	4	1	37
783	Peter Martin	1985–1988	20	2	0	0	8
784	Steve Robinson	1985	14	3	0	0	12
785	Steve Hanson	1985–1990	86	4	0	0	16
786	Geoff Blinkhorn	1985–1988	25	0	0	0	0
787	Paul Conlon	1985–1993	98	18	89	1	251
788	John O'Toole	1985	1	1	0	0	4
789	Geoff White	1985	5	1	0	0	4
790	Richard Smith	1985–1988	21	0	1	0	2
791	Peter Mayoh	1985–1987	3	0	0	0	0
792	Adrian Toole	1985–1993	130	8	0	0	32
793	Graham Murchie	1985–1986	6	2	0	0	8
794	Mark Cannon	1986–1989	55	17	0	13	81
795	Olsen Filipaina	1986–1987	18	2	24	0	56
796	Clayton Friend	1986–1989	68	8	1	2	36
797	Gavin Jones	1986–1995	120	2	0	0	8
798	Les Kiss	1986–1993	100	29	38	0	192
799	John McArthur	1986–1995	133	28	25	2	164
800	Martin Bella	1986–1989	83	1	0	0	4
801	Greg Florimo	1986–1998	285	72	3	1	295
802	Paul Gearin	1986	1	0	0	0	0
803	Gregg Lennon	1986–1987	18	11	0	0	44
804	Brett French	1986–1989	66	17	0	0	68
805	Terry Butler	1986	4	0	0	0	0
806	Peter Edwards	1986	3	0	0	0	0
807	Steve Gaffney	1986	2	0	0	0	0
808	Geoff Clark	1987	17	4	14	0	44
809	Ian French	1987–1990	71	15	0	0	60
810	Steve Keir	1987	4	0	0	0	0
811	Peter Benson	1987	5	0	0	0	0
812	Gary Larson	1987–1999	233	33	0	0	132
813	John Dorahy	1987–1989	37	6	102	5	231
814	Kevin Marr	1987–1989	40	2	0	0	8
815	Andrew Fullagar	1987–1991	14	0	0	0	0
816	Kerry Boustead	1988–1990	34	8	0	0	32
817	Tony Rea	1988–1994	120	14	14	1	85
818	Gary Smith	1988–1992	51	4	0	0	16
819	Andrew Vincent	1988	1	0	0	0	0
820	Jamie Tuite	1988	3	0	0	0	0
821	Gary Maguire	1988	5	1	0	0	4
822	Paul Sirio	1988	3	0	0	0	0
823	Sean Willey	1988	2	0	0	0	0
824	Kevin Thompson	1988–1990	26	2	0	1	9
825	Kelly Egan	1989–1992	27	3	0	0	12
826	Scott Gale	1989–1990	26	3	1	1	15
827	Bruce Sinclair	1989–1990	15	0	0	0	0
828	Billy Moore	1989–1999	211	34	0	0	136
829	Mark Soden	1989–1999	170	28	1	1	115
830	David Alexander	1989–1992	48	2	0	0	8
831	Paul Beaven	1989	18	1	0	0	4
832	Brett Gale	1989	2	0	0	0	0
833	Peter McPhail	1989–1992	50	2	0	0	8
834	Barry Mulquin	1989–1990	7	0	0	0	0
835	Andrew Foord	1989–1990	6	1	0	0	4
836	David Fairleigh	1989–1999	193	36	0	0	144
837	Jason Martin	1989–1992	66	2	0	1	9
838	Wayne Taekata	1989	1	0	0	0	0
840	Pat Jarvis	1990–1991	44	3	0	0	12
841	David Hall	1990–1997	153	55	0	0	220
842	Darren Wright	1990	2	0	0	0	0
843	Steve McGowan	1990	6	1	0	0	4
844	Phil Blake	1991	11	1	0	1	5
845	Mario Fenech	1991–1994	82	4	0	0	16
846	Daryl Halligan	1991–1993	64	23	225	2	544
847	Peter Jackson	1991–1993	31	3	0	2	14
848	Paul Simonsson	1991–1992	3	0	0	0	0
849	Scott Wilson	1991–1992	20	6	0	0	24
850	Craig Wilson	1991–1996	106	13	3	0	55
851	Simon Tinker	1991	2	0	0	0	0
852	Greg Barwick	1992–1993	25	4	0	1	17
853	Jeff Doyle	1992–1993	28	5	0	0	20
854	Wayne Chisholm	1992	2	0	0	0	0
855	Tony Hearn	1992–1995	47	4	0	0	16
856	Chris Caruana	1992–1997	108	38	0	0	152
857	Craig Makepeace	1992–1995	22	8	17	0	66
858	Noel Solomon	1992–1994	29	5	0	0	20
859	George Bartlett	1992–1994	19	1	0	0	4
860	Jamie Mathiou	1992–1993	4	1	0	0	4
861	Mat Toshack	1992–1996	55	18	0	0	72
862	Jason Austin	1992	1	0	0	0	0
863	Danny Williams	1993–1997	66	3	0	0	12
864	Josh Stuart	1993–1999	111	5	0	0	20
865	Alan Wilson	1993	2	0	0	0	0
866	Glen Liddiard	1993	5	2	0	0	8
867	Jason Bell	1993	1	0	0	0	0
868	Gary Edwards	1993–1994	4	0	0	0	0
869	Matt Seers	1993–1999	133	45	0	0	180
870	Sean Hoppe	1994	25	15	0	0	60
871	Jason Taylor	1994–1999	147	32	563	20	1274
872	Ivan Cleary	1994–1995	37	15	5	0	70
873	Paul Smith	1994	2	0	0	0	0
874	Paul Heffernan	1994–1995	9	2	0	0	8
875	Luke Erenavula	1994–1995	4	2	0	0	8
876	Nigel Roy	1995–1999	117	35	0	0	140
877	Jody Rudd	1995	5	0	0	0	0
878	Bernard Wilson	1995	5	0	0	0	0
879	Craig Eveleigh	1995	2	1	0	0	4
880	William Leyshon	1995–1999	41	5	0	0	20
881	Sean Pinder	1995	1	0	0	0	0
882	Dean McDonald	1995	1	0	0	0	0
883	Mark Reber	1995–1998	43	2	0	0	8
884	Craig Smith	1995	2	1	0	0	4
885	Brenton Pomery	1995–1996	15	0	0	0	0
886	Michael Buettner	1996–1999	95	58	2	0	236
887	Brett Dallas	1996–1999	76	46	0	0	184
888	Ben Ikin	1996–1999	87	35	4	0	148
889	Steve Trindall	1996–1999	94	3	0	0	12
890	Dallas Weston	1996	9	0	0	0	0
891	Wade Horder	1996–1999	16	7	0	0	28
892	Darren Fritz	1997	5	0	0	0	0
893	Scott Pethybridge	1997–1999	55	16	0	0	64
894	Willie McLean	1997–1999	6	0	0	0	0
895	Paul Stringer	1997–1999	27	5	0	0	20
896	Glenn Morrison	1998–1999	42	9	0	0	36
897	Adam Muir	1998–1999	24	9	0	0	36
898	Sean Rutgerson	1998–1999	12	0	0	0	0
899	Joel Wilson	1998–1999	21	8	0	0	32
900	Justin Yeo	1998	1	0	0	0	0
901	Jamie Goddard	1999	24	7	0	0	28
902	Mark O'Meley	1999	22	0	0	0	0
903	Wes Tillott	1999	1	0	0	0	0
904	Anthony Swann	1999	8	1	0	0	4
905	Nick Shaw	1999	1	0	0	0	0
906	Jamie Fitzgerald	1999	17	0	0	0	0
907	Beau Gallagher	1999	3	0	0	0	0
908	David Hicks	1999	5	0	0	0	0
909	Dane Morgan	1999	5	0	0	0	0
910	Steve Parsons	1999	3	1	0	0	4
