= Cumberland (rugby league team) =

Australian rugby league team in 1908

Club information
- Full name: Central Cumberland
- Nickname: Fruitpickers
- Short name: Cumberland
- Founded: 21 April 1908 (foundation club)
- Exited: 1908

Former details
- Competition: NSWRFL
- 1908: 9th of 9

Records
- Wooden spoons: 1* (1908)
- Most capped: Harry Bloomfield – 8 A. Halling – 8 S. Jarvis – 8 Thomas Lalor – 8 F. O'Grady – 8
- Highest points scorer: Harry Bloomfield – 19

Cumberland, officially known as Central Cumberland, were a rugby league team in 1908 based in the region of Cumberland Plain in western Sydney. They were one of the nine original teams in the first New South Wales Rugby League (NSWRL) season, albeit admitted after the first round of matches had already been played. They are the shortest lived team in the history of first-grade rugby league in Australia after disbanding late that year. Statistically, they are the club with the poorest all-time record, only lasting eight games in their inaugural and only season.

== History ==
The Cumberland area was dominated by rugby union as the main winter sport. The local Kings School took part in a regular competition of rugby union with other clubs Aallaroo, Calder House, Civil, Lyndhurst, Military, Newington, North Shore and Waratah. These teams in the area by 1900, were put under the banner of Western Suburbs Rugby Union.

=== Formation ===
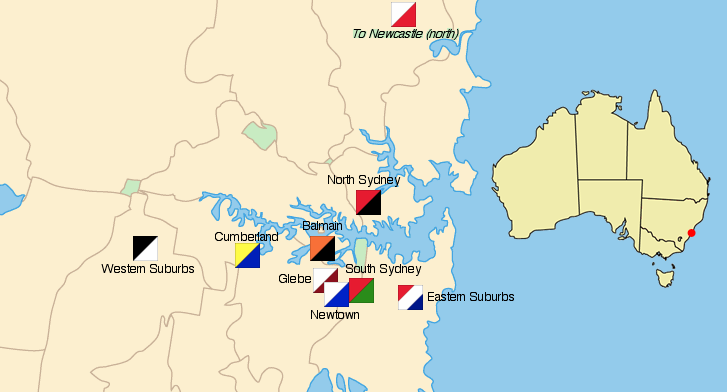
Cumberland's geographic position in relation to other clubs of the 1908 competition

The club was formed on the night of 21 April 1908 at Horse and Jockey Hotel, Homebush, the night after the first round of rugby league was being held in the NSWRL premiership. On that morning, Sydney newspaper The Daily Telegraph advertised a meeting for that night to discuss the formation of rugby league club in the Cumberland area. The meeting was attended by annoyed members of the Western Suburbs Rugby Union Club who were asked to form a rugby league club under the name Central Cumberland.

When the Western Suburbs formed their club, most of their players had come from Ashfield Rugby Union Club, which was a second division team to the Western Suburbs Rugby Union Club. All but two of the first grade team of Western Suburbs Rugby Union Club rejected offers from Western Suburbs. However, when Cumberland were looking for players, 23 of the 27 players present at the meeting signed with the club, most of which were rugby union players from the Western Suburbs Rugby Union Club.

The NSWRL were reluctant to admit a ninth team into the premiership and proposed they merge with nearby team Western Suburbs. However, the clubs involved declined, so the NSWRL agreed to allowing the Cumberland team to a trial match against Eastern Suburbs. While Eastern Suburbs won the match 18–4, the NSWRL was convinced that Cumberland could be competitive. As the NSWRL premiership had already begun, the NSWRL had to reformat the draw to include Cumberland, which meant increasing the number of teams from eight to nine. Cumberland did not have a home ground, like some of the other teams, and would play their games at the Agricultural Ground, Birchgrove Oval and Wentworth Park.

=== 1908 season ===
The first match they played was against Souths on 9 May 1908 and despite the loss, the league praised the club over the 20,000 crowd that attended the game. The game, which Cumberland lost 23–2, was played as a curtain-raiser to an international match between Australia and New Zealand.

9 May 1908; LOSS	South Sydney	23–2	Cumberland	Agricultural Ground
	Arthur Butler (1t, 2g) 7 Dick Green (1t, 2g) 7 Tommy Anderson (2t) 6 Frank Storie (1t) 3		2 (1g) Harry Bloomfield	Attendance: 20,000; Referee: G. Seabrook

16 May 1908; LOSS	Newcastle	27–0	Cumberland	Wentworth Park
	Stan Carpenter (2t, 2g) 10; Artie Coleman (3t) 9 George Cox (1t, 1g) 5 Ted McGuiness (1t, 1g) 5 Bill Bailey (1t) 3 George Price (1t) 3 W. Robinson (1g) 2			Attendance: 3,000; Referee: C. Hutchison

23 May 1908; LOSS	Cumberland	6–16	Newtown	Birchgrove Oval
	Edward Bellamy (3g) 6		7 (1t, 1g, 1fg) John Scott; 6 (2t) E. Taylor; 3 (1t) Tedda Courtney	Referee: G. Seabrook

30 May 1908; LOSS	Glebe	22–7	Cumberland	Wentworth Park
	Albert Conlon (1t, 4g) 11; Tom McCabe (2t) 6 Arthur Halloway (1t) 3 A.Wright (1g) 2		7 (1t, 1g, 1fg) Edward Bellamy	Attendance: 1,200; Referee: E. Hooper

20 June 1908; LOSS	Balmain	16–4	Cumberland	Birchgrove Oval
	Alf Latta (1t, 2g) 7 George Wilcox (1t) 3 Tommy O'Donnell (1t) 3 W. Fisher (1t) 3		4 (2g) Harry Bloomfield	Attendance: 1,200; Referee: C. Hutchison

27 June 1908; LOSS	Eastern Suburbs	26–5	Cumberland	Agricultural Ground
	Herb Brackenreg (1t, 4g) 11; Daniel Frawley (2t) 6 Albert Rosenfield (1t) 3 H. Thompson (1t) 3 Horrie Miller (1t) 3		3 (1t) Edward Bellamy; 2 (1g) Harry Bloomfield	Attendance: 4,000; Referee: F. Henlen

Both Cumberland and Western Suburbs had been winless to this point of the season and Cumberland had a score to settle with their rivals from Western Suburbs Rugby Union Club who were with Western Suburbs rugby league club. Cumberland led 4–2 at half time, having two penalty goals kicked by Harry Bloomfield in the first half, however Western Suburbs goalkicker Jim Abercrombie kicked a penalty goal to equalise, after which George Cribb scored between the post and Bloomfield kicked the goal to make it 9–4. Abercrombie scored another penalty goal to make it 9–6, after which Bloomfield intercepted a pass, kicked the ball and regathered it to score which he also converted to win the match 14–6. Cumberland won its only game in the premiership season and ever.

4 July 1908; WIN	Western Suburbs	6–14	Cumberland	Birchgrove Oval
	J. Hodgson (2g) 4 Jim Abercrombie (1g) 2		11 (1t, 4g) Harry Bloomfield; 3 (1t) George Cribb	Attendance: 3,000; Referee: C. Hutchison

In what turned out to be their final ever game, Cumberland were only able to field eleven out of the required thirteen players. The club ended up borrowing two players from the opposing team North Sydney to play for them, who were 'Paddy' Boland and Bert Odbert. They lost this game 45–0 and were awarded the wooden spoon for finishing on the bottom of the competition ladder.

25 July 1908; LOSS	Cumberland	0–45	North Sydney	Wentworth Park
			7 (1t, 2g) Harry Glanville; 6 (2t) Arthur Bolland; 6 (2t) J. Mathieson; 6 (2t) W. Rochester; 4 (2g) Bill Whitfield; 3 (1t) Fred Notting; 3 (1t) Sid Deane; 2 (1g) Joe Kendall; 2 (1g) Lancelot Hansen	Attendance: 200; Referee: M. Welch

=== Demise ===
Cumberland's dismal winning percentage and the inability to field a team led to their disbanding at the end of the season. After only playing eight first-grade matches and one trial match, Cumberland ceased to exist and passed into history. Seven of the Cumberland players moved to neighbours Western Suburbs, although only Harry Bloomfield, A. Halling and S. Jarvis played first-grade rugby league again.

== Colours and crest ==
Central Cumberland Fruitpickers logos

1908
Central Cumberland Fruitpickers uniforms

Cumberland's neighbour club Western Suburbs had used black and white as their colours, which had been taken from Ashfield rugby club, a second grade rugby union team which supplied many of Western Suburbs players. Unlike other clubs, Western Suburbs did not take their colours from their district rugby union team, due to Ashfield's influence at the club. Cumberland thought of using the bottle green of the Western Suburbs Rugby Union Club', as many of their team members were from there. However, the club believed that some would be unable to distinguish Western Suburbs and Cumberland if this approach was taken.

The club eventually chose the colours of the local Parramatta council, which were royal blue and gold, which were represented on their jersey in horizontal stripes, or hoops. The crest used these colours and was like many of the other crests of the 1908 season, a badge with a letter 'C', to represent the first letter of Cumberland. The badge was royal blue, while the letter gold. These colours were later used by the Parramatta Eels at their introduction in the NSWRL premiership in 1947, although there was no official affiliation between Cumberland and the later Parramatta team. The club's jersey was, like most other clubs, the colours in hoops around the jersey. These hoops of blue and gold were mixed with a white collar and black or grey shorts.

== Players ==
Cumberland used twenty-four players in their eight matches:

Key
- Position – the rugby league position that player played at.
- Career – the years the player spent at the team.
- Appearances – the number of times this player played for the team.
- T – the number of tries the player scored for the team.
- G – the number of goals the player scored for the team.
- FG – the number of field goals the player scored for the team.
- P – The total number of points scored by the player.

Name	Nationality	Position	Career	Appearances	T	G	FG	P
A Abbott	(Australia)	FB/WG/LK	1908	5	0	0	0	0
J Andrews	(Australia)	FE/HB	1908	3	0	0	0	0
Edward Bellamy	(Australia)	PR/HK	1908	6	2	5	0	16
Harry Bloomfield	(Australia)	FB	1908	8	1	8	0	19
Edward 'Paddy' Boland	(Australia)	PR/HK	1908	1	0	0	0	0
Albert Burdus	(Australia)	PR/SR	1908	4	0	0	0	0
Robert Casey	(Australia)	PR/HK	1908	7	0	0	0	0
V Casson	(Australia)	PR/SR	1908	2	0	0	0	0
S Cole	(Australia)	SR/LK	1908	2	0	0	0	0
George Cribb	(Australia)	FE/HB	1908	4	0	0	0	0
James Cribb	(Australia)	CE/FE	1908	5	1	0	0	3
A.G. Fraser	(Australia)	SR	1908	2	0	0	0	0
Albert Halling	(Australia)	WG/CE	1908	8	0	0	0	0
A Harris	(Australia)	WG/HK	1908	6	0	0	0	0
A Hawkins	(Australia)	SR/LK	1908	4	0	0	0	0
S Jarvis	(Australia)	PR/HK	1908	8	0	0	0	0
A Kells	(Australia)		1908	1	0	0	0	0
Thomas Lalor	(Australia)	PR/SR	1908	8	0	0	0	0
E Maxwell	(Australia)		1908	1	0	0	0	0
F O'Grady	(Australia)	WG/CE	1908	8	0	0	0	0
F Odbert	(Australia)		1908	1	0	0	0	0
J Spears	(Australia)	HB	1908	3	0	0	0	0
S Wallis	(Australia)	FB/CE	1908	6	0	0	0	0
F Wright	(Australia)	FB/WG	1908	2	0	0	0	0

=== Representative players ===
Cumberland has no representative players.

== Records and statistics ==
=== Individual records ===
Harry Bloomfield, statistically, is Cumberland's best player. Bloomfield, along with A. Halling, S. Jarvis, Thomas Lalor and F. O'Grady played all eight matches for Cumberland. Bloomfield played fullback and scored nineteen points for Cumberland which encompassed one try and eight goals throughout the season which was enough to warrant representation for New South Wales in an interstate match against Queensland. This included eleven points in one match, against Wests in their only win for the Season. E. Bellamy claims hold to most tries in a season, scoring two, one in the match against Glebe, the other against Eastern Suburbs.

=== Team honours ===
Statistically, Cumberland are the worst team in the history of first-grade rugby league in Australia. They only have won 12.5% of their games, lower than Annandale (18.3%), which is also a defunct team. They won the wooden spoon for being last on the table in the 1908 season. (This is debatable, as they finished on 6 points, which places them 7th, but they had two byes when every other team only had one.) They had only one win which was 14–6 over Western Suburbs, and had their worst loss in their final game against Norths, 45–0. They lost six consecutive games from 9 May 1908 until 27 June 1908, a win, then a final loss. They scored an average 4.75 points each game whereas they had an average of 23.88 points scored against them.

Win–loss record
Season	Played	Wins	Draws	Losses	Total points scored	Total points conceded	Win percentage
1908	8	1	0	7	38	191	12.50%

== See also ==
- New South Wales Rugby League premiership
