= Joe Kendall =

Joe Kendall may refer to:

- Joe Kendall (American football) (1909–1965), American football player
- Joe Kendall (rugby league) (1882–1958), Australian rugby league footballer
- Elton Joe Kendall (born 1954), American judge

== See also ==
- Jo Kendall (1938–2022), British actress
- Joseph Kendall (disambiguation)
