= Pat Maher (rugby league) =

Australia international rugby league footballer

Personal information
- Full name: Herbert Patrick Maher
- Born: 4 September 1903 Wingham, New South Wales, Australia
- Died: 8 January 1980 (aged 76)

Playing information
- Position: Centre
Club
Years	Team	Pld	T	G	FG	P
1928–32	South Sydney	44	11	0	0	33
Representative
Years	Team	Pld	T	G	FG	P
1928	Australia	1	0	0	0	0
1928–32	New South Wales	13	8	0	0	21
- Relatives: Mick Maher (nephew)

Pat Maher (1903-1980) was an Australian rugby league footballer who played in the 1920s and 1930s. He played for South Sydney as a centre.

== Playing career ==
Maher began his rugby league career in country New South Wales playing for Lismore and also captaining the New South Wales country and far north coast teams. In 1928, Maher signed for South Sydney and at the end of the year was selected to play for New South Wales and Australia. Maher only played in one match for Australia, the second test match against England at the Sydney Cricket Ground. Although Maher played for Souths in the 1920s and 1930s, he only featured in two grand final winning teams which were the 1931 premiership side that defeated arch rivals Eastern Suburbs 12-7 at the Sydney Sports Ground and the following year when Souths defeated Western Suburbs 19-12 in the grand final challenge replay. This match would be Maher's last for the club and he retired at the end of the season.
