= Allan Lawson =

Allan Lawson may refer to:

- Allan Lawson (rugby league), see List of North Sydney Bears players
- Allan Lawson (footballer) (born 1941), see List of Oldham Athletic A.F.C. players

== See also ==
- Alan Lawson (disambiguation)
