= World of Sport (Sydney, Australia TV series) =

Australian television series

World of Sport was a sports program and talk show broadcast on TCN9 in Sydney in the 1960s and 1970s. It was hosted by Ron Casey. The main sport covered was Rugby league. The panelists included Frank Hyde (radio 2SM rugby league caller) and Peter Frilingos (Daily Telegraph rugby league writer).
