= Alan Lawson (disambiguation) =

Alan Lawson may refer to

- Alan Lawson (born 1948), Scottish rugby union player
- C. Alan Lawson (born 1961), American attorney

== See also ==
- Allan Lawson (disambiguation)
