= Harry Bloomfield =

Australian rugby league footballer

Personal information
- Full name: Harold Alford Bloomfield
- Born: 6 October 1882 Canterbury, New South Wales
- Died: 12 July 1950 (aged 67) Homebush, New South Wales

Playing information
- Position: Fullback, Wing, Centre
Club
| Years | Team | Pld | T | G | FG | P |
|---|---|---|---|---|---|---|
| 1908 | Cumberland | 8 | 1 | 8 | 0 | 19 |
| 1909 | Western Suburbs | 4 | 0 | 2 | 0 | 4 |
| | Total | 12 | 1 | 10 | 0 | 23 |
Representative
| Years | Team | Pld | T | G | FG | P |
| 1908 | New South Wales | 1 | 0 | 0 | 0 | 0 |
| 1908 | Metropolis | 2 | 0 | 1 | 0 | 0 |

Harry Bloomfield (1883–1950) was an Australian pioneering rugby league footballer who played for the New South Wales team. He was the first captain for the NSWRFL foundation club Cumberland in the inaugural 1908 season. Bloomfield represented New South Wales on two occasions in 1908. For the second match of the 1908 Interstate series, the first against Queensland, Bloomfield was selected as New South Wales' fullback and kicked a goal in the Blues' victory. He was retained at fullback for the third game, another victory. The Cumberland club only lasted one year and Bloomfield then transferred to Western Suburbs for the 1909 NSWRFL season.

Bloomfield died at Homebush, New South Wales on 12 July 1950, aged 67.
