= Bruce Ruxton =

Australian activist

Bruce Carlyle Ruxton
- Born: 6 February 1926
- Died: 23 December 2011 (aged 85); Queensland, Australia
- Military career
- Allegiance: Australia
- Branch: Australian Army
- Service years: 1944–1949
- Rank: Private
- Unit: 2/25 Australian Infantry Battalion
- Conflicts: World War II; South West Pacific; Netherlands East Indies; Battle of Balikpapan
- Awards: MBE, OBE, AM, Chevalier of the Order of Merit (France), Chevalier of the Legion of Honour (France).
- Other work: President of the Victorian Returned and Services League

Bruce Carlyle Ruxton, AM, OBE (6 February 1926 – 23 December 2011) was an Australian ex-serviceman and President of the Victorian Returned and Services League from 1979 to 2002.

== Early life ==
Ruxton grew up in Kew, Victoria. He attended Melbourne High School.

== War service ==
Ruxton served in World War II in the South West Pacific Area. He enlisted in the Second Australian Imperial Force on 21 February 1944, listing his civilian occupation as "pupil land surveyor". He was allocated the service number VX94379. In late 1944, he was posted to the Royal Australian Engineers, serving for two months with the 2nd Australian Field Survey Company in Queensland before then joining the 2/1st Australian Topographical Survey Company in December 1944. He sailed to Morotai with this unit in April 1945. In June 1945, Private Ruxton was posted to the 2/25th Australian Infantry Battalion and served both as a rifleman and in the battalion's intelligence section in the Battle of Balikpapan (1945) in Borneo.

After the war ended, Ruxton volunteered to serve in Japan with the British Commonwealth Occupation Force. He was posted to the 65th Infantry Battalion, part of the 34th Australian Infantry Brigade, and was deployed to Japan in early 1946. In late 1947, Ruxton attended the British Commonwealth Occupation Force School of Cookery and qualified as an army cook, after which he was transferred to the Australian Army Catering Corps. He served in Japan until December 1948 when he returned to Australia. He was discharged from the Army on 13 January 1949.

== Representing the war veterans ==
After his war service, he became a spokesman on behalf of war veterans and their families, ensuring they received their pensions and entitlements. As the Second World War veterans grew older, he lobbied on their behalf regarding issues such as nursing homes and retirement accommodation.

He lived in the Melbourne bayside suburb of Beaumaris.

Following two years of ill-health due to viral pneumonia contracted during a visit to Boer War sites, Ruxton resigned as President of the Victorian RSL in June 2002.

== Advocacy ==
Along with RSL National President, Brigadier Alf Garland, Ruxton was an opponent of the Multifunction Polis (MFP), a Japanese funded technology city proposed in 1987 for the north of Adelaide. Ruxton said it would become "a Jap city".

Ruxton opposed any association with homosexuals in the armed forces and in official memorial services. While president of the Victorian RSL, during the Anzac Day March in 1982, he stood in the path of members of the Gay Ex-servicemen's Association to prevent them from laying a wreath at the Shrine of Remembrance. When interviewed he stated “We didn’t want them to lay a wreath because we didn’t want them—and they are just another start to the denigration of Anzac Day,” and "I don't remember a single poofter from World War II." During the early 1980s, the group Women Against Rape attempted to bring attention to rapes committed by soldiers during war. Regarding the women in the group, Ruxton stated "If one looked at them, I wonder how rape would be possible."

In 1980 Ruxton criticised the Northcote City Council in Victoria, after left-wing Councillors supported a number of policies that were anathema to those traditionally held by the RSL. These included the flying of the Eureka flag rather than the Australian flag from the Northcote Town Hall, and support for an Australian republic. Ruxton claimed 'ethnics and anti-British elements' were responsible for a lack of patriotism. Ruxton was also incensed at the refusal of Scottish-born Councillor Brian Sanaghan to renew his oath of allegiance to the Queen after being re-elected to the Northcote Council in 1980. Pressure from Ruxton resulted in Sanaghan's place on the Council being declared vacant.

During Anglican Bishop Desmond Tutu’s visit to Victoria in 1986, Ruxton referred to him as a "witch doctor" who "breathed hatred" and accused him of encouraging black servants in South Africa to poison white children. Asked in a 2002 ABC documentary what he though of people who branded him a racist, Ruxton replied that he "Couldn't care less", but admitted regretting the "witchdoctor" comment.

Ruxton was an opponent of Asian immigration and opposed Aboriginal Land rights.

In the 1998 Constitutional Convention for the Republic he represented monarchist group Safeguard the People. On 31 January 1992, Ruxton stated that the RSL and its membership: "will never agree to this country becoming a republic. We are proud to be associated with the Queen, who is our patron, and who, as this country's head of State, has never once put a foot wrong. Show me a politician with such a record." Ruxton consistently argued that the Australian flag and the Queen, as the Australian head of state, guarantee that Australia will remain a free democracy, and that a republican form of government in Australia could become totalitarian.

In 1991, Ruxton appeared on the Nine Network's Midday television show with host Ray Martin, to advocate Australia remaining a monarchy, in a live televised debate with singer Normie Rowe and radio broadcaster Ron Casey. The debate got out of hand, with Normie Rowe and Ron Casey physically brawling on live TV. The following day, Ruxton said: "As for Ron Casey, he deserved a good punch in the nose. He certainly did not do his cause any good. We have enough problems to fix up without arguing and fighting over whether Australia should become a republic,"

In 1998, Ruxton wrote a letter to Shock Records regarding the TISM single "I Might Be a Cunt, but I'm Not a Fucking Cunt". In it, he referred to the single "dropping (Australia)'s standards into the proverbial sewer".

== Popular culture ==
A character originally from Australia You're Standing In It (and later in Fast Forward), Bruce Rump, was based on him. Bruce Rump would rant in a voice similar to Ruxton's, sometimes reaching a violent frenzy and ending with the non-sequitur "... and that's why we should keep the bloody flag the same!" The send ups of Bruce Rump would often also be send ups of long running Australian children's TV series Romper Room, referred to as "Rumper Room".

Ruxton made fun of himself by releasing a rap single, in which he lampooned his own persona. A song by Melbourne punk band Res-Heads was named after Ruxton.

== Honours ==
In 1975 he was appointed a Member of the Order of the British Empire (MBE), an Officer of the Order (OBE) in the 1981 Birthday Honours, and a Member of the Order of Australia (AM) in 1996. In 1997 he was appointed a Chevalier of the Order of Merit by Jacques Chirac. He was also appointed a Chevalier of the Legion of Honour.

== Death ==
He died on 23 December 2011, following the development of dementia. He was 85. His funeral service included a Masonic tribute as well as full RSL honours.
