= Joseph Kendall =

Joseph Kendall may refer to:

- Joseph G. Kendall (1788–1847), U.S. Representative from Massachusetts
- Joseph M. Kendall (1863–1933), U.S. Representative from Kentucky
- Joseph Kendall (cricketer), English cricketer

== See also ==
- Joe Kendall (disambiguation)
