= Albert Burdus =

Australian rugby league player

Personal information
- Full name: Albert Hilton Burdus
- Born: 21 January 1885; Lithgow, New South Wales, Australia
- Died: 2 June 1961 (aged 76)

Playing information
- Position: Prop, Second-row, Lock
Club
Years	Team	Pld	T	G	FG	P
1908	Cumberland	4	0	0	0	19
1909–17	Western Suburbs	19	1	0	0	3
	Total	23	1	0	0	22

Albert Hilton Burdus (21 January 1885 – 2 June 1961) was an Australian professional rugby league footballer who played in the New South Wales Rugby League Premiership in the 1900s and 1910s. He played 5 seasons - 1 for Cumberland and four with Western Suburbs.

== Playing career ==
On May 23, 1908, Burdus made his first grade debut with the Cumberland Fruit Pickers in a Round 4 loss to Newtown. He made three more appearances with the Fruit Pickers, before the team disbanded before the end of 1908 due to their inability to field a team and poor team performances.

Like many of his other teammates, Burdus started playing for the neighbouring Western Suburbs club next season. He made his debut for the club in the third round in a 5-10 loss to Glebe. This was his only appearance that 1909 season. This also ended up being Burdus' last game until returning with the team in 1912.

Burdus played his first game in three years in Western Suburbs' final game of the season against Annandale. His team ended up losing 6-15. Western Suburbs only won one game for the 1912 season, receiving the wooden spoon.

In 1913, he played a large majority of the season with 13 appearances. In Round 4, he scored his first and only try of his career in a 19-27 loss to North Sydney. He also tasted victory for the first time in his career, when his team defeated Annandale 11-6 in Round 6. Western Suburbs however, were an unsuccessful team once again, tying with Annandale for the least wins (3) for the 1913 season.

Following the 1913 season, Burdus had a 4-year absence from the competition, before returning the second time in his career in 1917. He only played three games that season, playing the opening round against South Sydney, before playing Rounds 2 and 4. Round 4 against North Sydney turned out to be his last. He concluded his five-year career with 1 try from 23 appearances (including a 1913 game in the City Cup).
