= Bruce Foye =

Australian rugby league footballer

Personal information
- Full name: Bruce Bernhardt Foye
- Born: 13 July 1950

Playing information
- Position: Hooker
Club
Years	Team	Pld	T	G	FG	P
1973–80	North Sydney Bears	107	11	0	0	33
1981	Eastern Suburbs	4	0	0	0	0
	Total	111	11	0	0	33

Bruce Foye is an Australian former professional rugby league footballer who played in the 1970s and 1980s for the North Sydney Bears and the Eastern Suburbs as a hooker.

== Playing career ==
Foye made his first grade debut for North Sydney in 1973. In 1975, Foye got his chance to cement a place in the starting side after the retirement of Ross Warner. Foye was a consistent starter for Norths over the next five seasons in a side which struggled on the field and culminated in a last placed finish in 1979. In 1981, Foye joined Eastern Suburbs and played one season with club before retiring at the end of the year.
