= Ross Warner (rugby league) =

Australian rugby league footballer (1943–2020)

Personal information
- Full name: Ross Warner
- Born: 10 November 1943 Tamworth, New South Wales, Australia
- Died: 2 August 2020 (aged 76) Manly, New South Wales, Australia

Playing information
- Position: Hooker
Club
Years	Team	Pld	T	G	FG	P
1963–74	North Sydney	200	14	0	0	42
Representative
Years	Team	Pld	T	G	FG	P
1964–65	New South Wales	3	1	0	0	3
1967	NSW City	2	0	0	0	0

Ross Warner (10 November 1943 – 1 August 2020) was an Australian rugby league footballer who played in the 1960s and 1970s.

== Playing career ==
Originally from Tamworth, New South Wales, Warner was given a contract by North Sydney in 1963.

He replaced club stalwart Norm Strong to become Norths hooker for the next twelve seasons. Warner represented New South Wales on three occasions and captained North Sydney towards the end of his career. Warner retired at the end of the 1974 NSWRFL season.

== Accolades ==
In 2007, Warner was named in the North Sydney team of the century at hooker.
