= Harry Allwork =

Australian rugby league footballer

Personal information
- Full name: Harold Cecil Allwork
- Born: 22 April 1909; Eastbourne, East Sussex, England
- Died: 31 October 1942 (aged 33); El Alamein, Kingdom of Egypt

Playing information
- Position: Forward
Club
Years	Team	Pld	T	G	FG	P
1933–34	North Sydney	16	2	0	0	6
Representative
Years	Team	Pld	T	G	FG	P
1935	Goulburn	1	0	0	0	0
1936	Southern Districts	1	0	0	0	0
1940	AIF	1	0	0	0	0

Harold Cecil Allwork (22 April 1909 – 31 October 1942) was an Australian rugby league footballer. He competed in the New South Wales Rugby League for North Sydney, and also represented the Second Australian Imperial Force in rugby league during the Second World War.

== Early life and rugby career ==
Allwork was born on 22 April 1909 in Eastbourne, England to William Thomas and Edith Mary Allwork. Allwork appeared in 16 matches for North Sydney in 1933–34, gaining 2 tries and earning 6 points in 16 appearances.

== Personal life and military career ==
Allwork was married and worked as a carpenter. He enlisted as a private in the Second Australian Imperial Force on 15 July 1940 and was assigned to the 2/3rd Pioneer Battalion. In 1940, Allwork appeared once for the AIF rugby league team. Allwork was transferred to the Middle Eastern theatre in November 1941, and was given 60 days field punishment for committing an "offence against the person of an invaded country" and for "striking a superior officer" in May 1942. He was killed in action during the Second Battle of El Alamein on 31 October 1942 and is buried at the El Alamein War Cemetery.

== Career statistics ==
Appearances and goals by club, season and competition
Club	Season	Division	League				Other				Total			
Club	Season	Division	Apps	Tries	Goals	Points	Apps	Tries	Goals	Points	Apps	Tries	Goals	Points
North Sydney	1933	New South Wales Rugby League	7	0	0	0	0	0	0	0	7	0	0	0
North Sydney	1934	New South Wales Rugby League	9	2	0	6	0	0	0	0	9	2	0	6
Club career total			16	2	0	6	0	0	0	0	16	2	0	6
Goulbourn	1935	Representative	1	0	0	0	0	0	0	0	1	0	0	0
Southern Districts	1936	Representative	1	0	0	0	0	0	0	0	1	0	0	0
AIF	1940	Representative	1	0	0	0	0	0	0	0	1	0	0	0
Representative career total			3	0	0	0	0	0	0	0	3	0	0	0
Career total			19	2	0	6	0	0	0	0	19	2	0	6
