= Frank Hyde =

Australian RL coach and former rugby league footballer

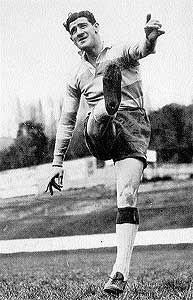

Personal information
- Full name: Francis Patrick Aloysius Hyde
- Born: 7 February 1916 Millers Point, New South Wales, Australia
- Died: 24 September 2007 (aged 91) Sydney, New South Wales, Australia

Playing information
Club
Years	Team	Pld	T	G	FG	P
1936–37	Newtown	15	2	0	0	6
1938–41	Balmain	38	16	2	0	52
1942–43	North Sydney	37	9	0	0	27
	Total	90	27	2	0	85
Representative
Years	Team	Pld	T	G	FG	P
1938–39	City	2	1	0	0	3
1938–39	New South Wales	5	3	0	0	9

Coaching information
Club
Years	Team	Gms	W	D	L	W%
1943–44	North Sydney	28	12	4	12	43
1950	North Sydney	18	5	1	12	28
	Total	46	17	5	24	37

Francis Patrick Aloysius Hyde MBE, OAM (7 February 1916 – 24 September 2007) was an Australian rugby league footballer, coach and radio caller. A New South Wales representative three-quarter, Hyde played his club football in Sydney for NSWRFL Premiership clubs Newtown, Balmain (with whom he won the 1939 Premiership) and North Sydney. Following his playing career, Hyde enjoyed even greater success as a commentator, earning him membership in the Order of the British Empire and a place in the Sport Australia Hall of Fame and the Australian Commercial Radio Industry Hall of Fame. Hyde's contribution to Rugby League is celebrated each year with the Frank Hyde Shield, a three match tournament played between the Newtown Jets and North Sydney Bears.

== Playing career ==
Balmain Tigers Premiership 1939, Hyde is pictured right. of coach Sid Goodwin

Born Francis Patrick Aloysius Hyde in 1916, he grew up in inner-city Sydney in The Rocks. Residential rules of the time required him to play for the Balmain club, but he preferred to play with Newtown and managed two seasons there before the rule was enforced upon him. In 1941 the rule hit him again and was forced to switch to North Sydney after it was discovered he had moved to Lane Cove. As Lane Cove fell within the North Sydney district (And still does to this day, although residential rules don't exist anymore), the club protested to the NSWRFL and claimed him from Balmain

During his playing career, Hyde represented the Newtown Bluebags, (now Newtown Jets), the Balmain Tigers, the North Sydney Shoremen (Now the North Sydney Bears) and, at the state level, New South Wales. He scored a try for the Balmain Tigers in their winning grand final of 1939, and was captain-coach of the North Sydney Bears when they reached the grand final in 1943 when defeated by Frank Farrell's Newtown. However, due to World War II, he was unable to represent the Australian national team. Frank Hyde married Gaby Schofield at Waverley in 1942. He retired as a player-coach in 1944. He returned to coach Norths for one last year in 1950.

== Media career ==
Hyde began his career as a broadcaster in 1953 and found immediate success as a Rugby League commentator. His renowned call, accompanying a shot for goal, of "It's long enough, it's high enough and it's straight between the posts" became an iconic part of the game. He broadcast 33 consecutive New South Wales Rugby League Grand finals from the Sydney Cricket Ground between 1953 and 1983 (including the replays of 1977 and 1978) on Sydney radio station 2SM from which he became famous. He also was a Rugby League journalist at the Fairfax Press for many years.

For many years, Hyde was a regular on Sydney television, mainly appearing with Ron Casey on the World of Sport in 1979, a weekend Rugby League program on the Nine Network.

== Recording career ==
During the 1970s, Hyde recorded 3 albums: Frank Hyde Sings, The Frank Hyde Party Sing-a-long and Frank Hyde Sings For The Good Times.

His famous rendition of the Irish classic Danny Boy, with Try a Little Kindness as the B Side were released in 1973 and peaked at number 69 on the Kent Music Report.

=== Albums discography ===
List of albums, with selected chart positions
Title	Album details	Peak chart positions
Title	Album details	AUS
Frank Hyde Sings	Released: 1973; Format: LP; Label: EMI (SPMEO 10027)	-
The Frank Hyde Party Sing-a-long	Released: 1973; Format: LP; Label: EMI (SPMEO 10095)	-
Frank Hyde Sings for the Good Times	Released: 1976; Format: LP; Label: Parlophone (SCA 007)	84

== Honours and awards ==
On 1 January 1974, at the age of 57, Hyde was made a Member of Order of the British Empire.

On 26 January 1990, Hyde was awarded the Medal of the Order Of Australia (OAM) for services to Rugby League Football and the media.

On 24 October 2000, at the age of 84, Hyde was awarded the Australian Sports Medal for his service to the game of rugby league as player, coach and broadcaster.

The Frank Hyde Shield is contested on an annual basis between the Newtown and North Sydney clubs.

In 2006 Hyde was inducted into the Australian Commercial Radio Hall of Fame.

== Family ==
Children: Gregory Francis Hyde (born 1943) Anne Elizabeth Hyde (born 1945) Michael James Hyde (born 1948) Margaret Mary Hyde (born 1948) Maria Linda Hyde (born 1955) Patrick Joseph Aloysius Hyde (born 1959)

== Death ==
Frank Hyde outlived his wife Gaby by seven months, and died on 24 September 2007 at the age of 91. He was survived by his 6 children, 6 grandchildren and 6 great-grandchildren. He was honoured at the 2007 NRL Grand final with a video-tribute during the half time break of the match between the Manly-Warringah Sea Eagles and Melbourne Storm and a minute's silence prior to the Premier League Grand Final.

== Notes ==
Sporting positions
Preceded by Harry McKinnon; 1949	Coach North Sydney; 1950	Succeeded by Laurie Doran; 1951
Preceded by Jack O' Reilly; 1942	Coach North Sydney; 1943–1944	Succeeded by Frank Burge; 1945
