= Mark Reber =

Australian rugby league footballer

Personal information
- Born: 14 January 1969 (age 57)

Playing information
- Position: Hooker
Club
Years	Team	Pld	T	G	FG	P
1995–98	North Sydney Bears	43	2	0	0	8
1999–00	Wigan Warriors	18	5	0	0	20
	Total	61	7	0	0	28

Mark Reber (born 14 January 1969) is a former professional rugby league footballer who played for North Sydney in the ARL and NRL, and Wigan in the Super League.

== Playing career ==
He then switched to rugby league and made his first grade debut for North Sydney in round 20 of the 1995 ARL season against Western Suburbs at North Sydney Oval. In the same year, he played in North Sydney's elimination final loss against the Newcastle Knights at Parramatta Stadium.

In the 1996 ARL season, Reber only made one appearance for the first grade team which came against the Western Reds in round 11 at North Sydney Oval.

Reber started at Hooker in the 1997 preliminary final between the North Sydney Bears and the Newcastle Knights. Newcastle won the match 17–12.

The next season, Reber made 25 appearances for Norths and was in the sides that lost both finals matches in succession. In 1999, Reber joined Wigan where he made 18 appearances over 2 seasons.
