= Wes Tillott =

Australian rugby league footballer

Personal information
- Born: 11 May 1979 (age 47)

Playing information
- Position: Fullback, Wing
Club
Years	Team	Pld	T	G	FG	P
1999	North Sydney Bears	1	0	0	0	0
2004	South Sydney	15	4	0	0	20
	Total	16	4	0	0	20

Wes Tillott is an Australian former professional rugby league footballer who played in the 1990s and 2000s. He played for South Sydney and North Sydney in the NRL competition.

== Playing career ==
Tillott made his first grade debut for North Sydney in round 4 1999 against North Queensland at Lang Park which ended in a 26–18 victory. The match is remembered for having one of the lowest ever attendances in the NRL era with only 3382 spectators showing up for the match. At the end of the 1999 NRL season, North Sydney were forced to merge with arch rivals Manly-Warringah to form the Northern Eagles as part of the NRL's rationalisation policy.

In 2004, Tillott signed for South Sydney and made his debut for the club in round 8 against the Newcastle Knights. In round 14 2004, Tillott scored 2 tries as Souths defeated Melbourne 28–26 at the Sydney Football Stadium. Tillott's final game in the top grade came in round 25 2004 against the Brisbane Broncos which finished in a 34–34 draw with Tillott scoring a try.

In 2009, it was revealed that Tillott was playing for the Wyong Roos in the Central Coast Division Rugby League competition.
