= Beau Gallagher =

Samoa international rugby league player (born 1977)

Personal information
- Born: 4 October 1977 (age 49) Apia, Western Samoa

Playing information
- Position: Prop
Club
Years	Team	Pld	T	G	FG	P
1999	North Sydney Bears	3	0	0	0	0
Representative
Years	Team	Pld	T	G	FG	P
2000	Samoa

Beau Gallagher (born 4 October 1977) is a Samoan former professional rugby league footballer who played in the 1990s and 2000s. He represented Samoa at the 2000 World Cup.

== Playing career ==
Gallagher played three first grade games for the North Sydney Bears in 1999.

In 2000 he moved to the Wests Tigers but did not play in a first grade match. He was named in the Samoan squad for the World Cup but did not play in a match at the tournament.

In 2010 he played for Tapuae in the Gisborne Tairawhiti competition.
