= Laurie Doran =

Australian rugby league footballer and coach

Personal information
- Full name: Laurence Albert Doran
- Born: 1918; Newtown, New South Wales, Australia
- Died: 7 January 1998 (aged 79–80)

Playing information
- Position: Second-row
Club
Years	Team	Pld	T	G	FG	P
1942–46	North Sydney	61	5	13	0	41
1947	Newtown	19	3	3	0	15
	Total	80	8	16	0	56
Representative
Years	Team	Pld	T	G	FG	P
1944	Sydney Firsts	1	0	0	0	0

Coaching information
Club
Years	Team	Gms	W	D	L	W%
1951	North Sydney	18	5	0	13	28

Laurie Doran was an Australian rugby league footballer who played in the 1940s. He played in the NSWRFL premiership for North Sydney and Newtown as a second rower.

== Playing career ==
Doran began his first grade career in 1942 with Norths and played in the 1943 NSWRL grand final defeat against Newtown in front of a crowd of 60,922 which was a record attendance for a grand final at the time. In 1947, Doran played one season with Newtown and his final game in first grade was the semi-final defeat against Canterbury-Bankstown. He also played representative football for NSW City featuring in one game during the 1944 season.

== Coaching career ==
Doran coached his former club North Sydney for 1 season in 1951 as the side finished last on the table claiming the wooden spoon.

Sporting positions
Preceded by Frank Hyde; 1950	Coach North Sydney; 1951	Succeeded by Ross McKinnon; 1952–1953
