= Peter McPhail =

Australian rugby league footballer

Personal information
- Full name: Peter McPhail
- Born: 19 January 1968 (age 58) Sydney, New South Wales, Australia

Playing information
- Position: Hooker, Second-row, Lock
Club
Years	Team	Pld	T	G	FG	P
1989–92	North Sydney	50	2	0	0	8
1993–95	Parramatta Eels	40	8	0	0	32
	Total	90	10	0	0	40
- Source: As of 6 June 2019

Peter McPhail is an Australian former rugby league footballer who played in the 1980s and 1990s. He played for North Sydney and the Parramatta Eels in the New South Wales Rugby League (NSWRL) competition.

== Playing career ==
McPhail made his first grade debut for North Sydney against the Brisbane Broncos in Round 7 1989 at North Sydney Oval which ended in a 36–10 loss.

In 1991, North Sydney had one of their best seasons in many years finishing 3rd on the table under the coaching of Steve Martin. McPhail played in all of the club's finals games as they fell short of a grand final appearance losing to the Canberra Raiders in the preliminary final.

In 1992, North Sydney finished a disappointing 11th place on the table and Martin was terminated as head coach. McPhail was also released and signed with Parramatta.

McPhail played 3 seasons at Parramatta as the club finished towards the bottom of the ladder each year. In 1995, McPhail played 7 games for Parramatta as they had one of their worst seasons on the field winning only 3 matches out of a possible 22 games.
