= Lloyd Hudson =

Australian rugby league footballer

Personal information
- Full name: Lloyd Hudson
- Born: 10 June 1923; Kempsey, New South Wales, Australia
- Died: 2 November 2015 (aged 92); Kempsey, New South Wales, Australia

Playing information
- Position: Prop
Club
Years	Team	Pld	T	G	FG	P
1950–55	North Sydney	89	17	0	0	51
Representative
Years	Team	Pld	T	G	FG	P
1953	New South Wales	2	0	0	0	0
1957	NSW Country	1	0	0	0	0
- Relatives: Alf Faull (cousin); Cec Waters (cousin)

Lloyd Hudson (1923-2015) was an Australian rugby league footballer who played in the 1950s. He played in the NSWRFL premiership for North Sydney and represented both New South Wales and New South Wales Country.

== Early life ==
Hudson was born and raised in Kempsey, New South Wales. Hudson played his junior rugby league in the local area before joining the Australian Army at the age of 18. Hudson served in World War 2 and returned to Australia in 1946. While in the army, Hudson became involved in boxing and won the army boxing title. In 1947, Hudson played in the local Kempsey competition again until he was persuaded by his older cousin Cec Waters (who went on to play 145 games for Norths) to sign with the club.

== Playing career ==
Hudson made his first grade debut for Norths in 1950. In 1952 and 1953, Norths made the preliminary finals but fell short of a grand final appearance on both occasions. Hudson was selected to represent New South Wales in the 1953 interstate series against Queensland. In 1954, Norths had problems finding Hudson suitable accommodation and due to the residency rules at the time had to release the player. In 1955, Hudson rejoined Norths for one final season before leaving the club.

Hudson then returned to Kempsey and became captain-coach of Central Kempsey for many years. At the age of 39, he took Central Kempsey to the premiership in his final year as a player. He died on 2 November 2015.
