= Alf Birtles =

Australian rugby league footballer

Personal information
- Full name: Alfred John Birtles
- Born: 23 April 1913 Neutral Bay, New South Wales, Australia
- Died: 28 August 1943 (aged 30) Germany

Playing information
- Position: Wing, Five-eighth
Club
Years	Team	Pld	T	G	FG	P
1933–37	North Sydney	50	31	1	0	95
Representative
Years	Team	Pld	T	G	FG	P
1933–37	NSW City	5	2	0	0	6
- Source: As of 28 February 2019
- Military career
- Allegiance: Australia
- Branch: Royal Australian Air Force
- Service years: 1941-1943
- Unit: RAF Bomber Command
- Conflicts: World War II

Alfred John Birtles (23 April 1913 – 28 August 1943) was a WWII RAAF officer who was killed over Germany. He had been an Australian rugby league footballer who played in the 1930s for the North Sydney in the NSWRL competition.

== Early life and playing career ==
Birtles was born in Neutral Bay, New South Wales on 23 April 1913. He made his first grade debut for North Sydney against St George in Round 1 1933. Birtles finished as the club's top try scorer in 1933, 1935 and 1936 and played for the club in two finals campaigns in 1935 and 1936. Birtles also represented New South Wales City between 1933 and 1937 on 5 occasions.

== Military service ==
Birtles enlisted with the RAAF in 1941 during World War II. He was selected to participate in the Empire Flight Training Scheme and was commissioned in April 1942 with the rank of Pilot Officer. He was posted to No 78 Squadron RAF to be trained as a flying instructor. He was aboard a Handley Page Halifax bomber aircraft which was shot down over Germany on 28 August 1943.

== Personal life ==
Birtles was the son of George Bernard and Ethel May Birtles, of Cremorne, New South Wales. At the time of his original enlistment in the RAAF, Birtles was employed as a linotype operator by Associated Newspapers, Sydney. He later married Dulcie Doreen Birtles (died 2004). Birtles is buried or commemorated at Durnbach War Cemetery near Munich, Germany.
