= Alf Faull =

Australian rugby league footballer

Personal information
- Full name: Alfred Ernest Faull
- Born: 7 November 1896; North Sydney, New South Wales, Australia
- Died: 1 May 1966 (aged 69); Manly, New South Wales, Australia

Playing information
- Position: Second-row, Lock, Prop, Hooker
Club
Years	Team	Pld	T	G	FG	P
1919–27	North Sydney	89	18	1	0	56
Representative
Years	Team	Pld	T	G	FG	P
1919–23	New South Wales	2	0	0	0	0
- Relatives: Cec Waters (cousin); Lloyd Hudson (cousin)

Alf Faull (1896–1966) was an Australian rugby league footballer who played in the 1910s and 1920s. He played his entire career in the NSWRFL premiership for North Sydney. He was the cousin of Cec Waters who played 145 games for North Sydney in the 1940s and 1950s and Lloyd Hudson who represented New South Wales and played for Norths also in the 1950s.

== Playing career ==
Faull began his first grade career for North Sydney in 1919 and in the same year was selected to play for New South Wales against Queensland. In 1921 and 1922, Faull played in the premiership winning teams for the club but missed out on playing in North Sydney's 1922 grand final victory over Glebe. This would be the last premiership Norths would win as a club before exiting the competition in 1999.

In 1923, Faull was selected to play again for New South Wales in the interstate series against Queensland. This would be his final representative honor. Faull played with Norths up until the end of 1927 and at the time became one of the club's longest serving players. He died in 1966.
