= Steve Mayoh =

Australian rugby league footballer and administrator

Personal information
- Full name: Steve Mayoh
- Born: 30 January 1957 (age 69)

Playing information
- Position: Prop
Club
Years	Team	Pld	T	G	FG	P
1979–85	North Sydney	92	9	4	0	37

Steve Mayoh is an Australian former rugby league footballer who played in the 1970s and 1980s. He played for North Sydney in the New South Wales Rugby League (NSWRL) competition.

== Playing career ==
Mayoh made his first grade debut for North Sydney in round 1 1979 against Cronulla-Sutherland at North Sydney Oval which ended in a 7-34 loss. Mayoh made a total of 6 appearances for Norths in his debut year as the club finished last on the table and claimed the wooden spoon after winning only 2 games all year.

After another two seasons spent near the bottom of the table, Norths fortunes changed in 1982 as the club finished third under the coaching of Ron Willey. Mayoh played in both finals games for Norths as the club lost both matches and crashed out of the finals series.

Mayoh played with Norths until the end of 1985 before retiring. His final game was against Manly-Warringah in round 24 1985 at Brookvale Oval which ended in a 24–6 defeat.
