= Matthew Wurth =

Australian rugby league footballer (1960–2021)

Personal information
- Born: 1960 Sydney, New South Wales, Australia
- Died: 7 September 2021 (aged 60–61)

Playing information
- Position: Lock
Club
Years	Team	Pld	T	G	FG	P
1983–85	North Sydney Bears	11	0	0	0	0

Matthew Wurth (1960–2021) was an Australian former rugby union and professional rugby league footballer who played in the 1980s. He played for the North Sydney Bears in the New South Wales Rugby League premiership competition.

Wurth was born in Sydney, New South Wales and attended St Joseph's College, Hunters Hill. He played in the school's champion first XVs of 1976, 1977 & 1978 and represented at the GPS and State schoolboy level in his senior year and the two years prior. He joined the Western Suburbs Magpies in 1980 but made no first grade appearances for that club. He played 6 reserve grade and 27 U/23 matches at Wests. He then joined the North Sydney Bears, making his first grade debut in 1983. He played eleven first grade matches for the Bears between 1983 and 1985.

The Wests Magpies and the North Sydney Bears clubs both posted obituary messages on their social media pages announcing Wurth's death on 8 September 2021. He had been battling cancer.

== Sources ==
- Whiticker, Alan & Hudson, Glen (2006) The Encyclopedia of Rugby League Players, Gavin Allen Publishing, Sydney
- St Joseph's College Annual Magazine (December 1978)
