= Con Sullivan =

Australia & NZ international rugby league footballer

Personal information
- Full name: Cornelius Patrick Sullivan
- Born: 31 July 1883 Wellington, New Zealand
- Died: 31 October 1964 (aged 81) Chatswood, New South Wales, Australia

Playing information
- Position: Prop, Second-row, Hooker
Club
Years	Team	Pld	T	G	FG	P
1910–16	North Sydney	72	8	0	0	24
Representative
Years	Team	Pld	T	G	FG	P
1909	Wellington	2	1	0	0	3
1909	New Zealand	6 (1)	2	0	0	6
1910–12	New South Wales	6	3	0	0	9
1910–14	Australia	7	0	0	0	0
1910	Australasia	2	0	0	0	0
- Relatives: Bob Sullivan (son); Sid Deane (brother-in-law)

Cornelius Patrick Sullivan (31 July 1883 – 31 October 1964) was a New Zealand-born rugby league footballer who played in the 1900s and 1910s and represented New Zealand, Australia, and Australasia.

== Playing career ==
Sullivan started his career playing rugby in Wellington where he was a representative player. In 1909 he switched codes and was selected to tour Australia, winning an international cap for New Zealand against Australia in 1909. He played 5 other tour matches, scoring 2 tries. In 1910 he started playing for North Sydney in the NSWRFL Premiership. Later in the year he played 2 matches for the Wellington rugby league team against Taranaki and Auckland.

In his first year at the club he was selected to play for New South Wales, Australia (including the first Ashes test on Australian soil) and a combined "Australasia" team against the first Great Britain Lions tourists. The following year he was selected to go on the 1911–12 Kangaroo tour of Great Britain, and played in 16 matches, for Australasia, including the third Test. Sullivan toured New Zealand with the New South Wales side in 1912-13 and played his last Test series against England in 1914 in teams captained by his clubmate and brother-in-law Sid Deane.

== Later years ==
Sullivan later married Deane's sister with their son Bob Sullivan continuing the family link with the club. Bob Sullivan made a Test appearance for Australia in 1954. His younger brother John also played for Norths in the 1950s as a versatile back.

Con Sullivan died in October 1964.
