= Gregg Lennon =

Australian rugby league footballer

Personal information
- Full name: Gregg Lennon
- Born: Australia

Playing information
- Position: Wing
Club
Years	Team	Pld	T	G	FG	P
1986–87	North Sydney Bears	18	11	0	0	44
1987–88	Wakefield Trinity	8	5	0	0	20
	Total	26	16	0	0	64

Gregg Lennon was an Australian former professional rugby league footballer who played in the 1980s. He played at club level for North Sydney Bears and Wakefield Trinity, as a wing.

== Playing career ==
Gregg Lennon made his début for Wakefield Trinity during September 1987, and he played his last match for Wakefield Trinity during the 1987–88 season.
