= Ron Casey (Sydney broadcaster) =

Australian TV presenter and radio host (1929–2018)

Ron Casey OAM
- Born: Ronald Arthur Casey; 5 July 1929; Lismore, New South Wales, Australia
- Died: 2 October 2018 (aged 89); Sydney, New South Wales, Australia
- Occupations: TV presenter; sports journalist; radio host
- Years active: 1948−2000

Ronald Arthur Casey OAM (5 July 1929 – 2 October 2018) was an Australian television presenter, sports journalist and talk-back radio host based in Sydney, New South Wales.

== Early life ==
Casey was born in Lismore, New South Wales on 5 July 1929, but moved to Sydney with his mother, Nellie Thorne, and brother, John Francis Casey, and settled at Coogee, New South Wales, when he was 10.

In 1944, Casey was a New South Wales state swimming champion, and he went on to work for thirteen years as a professional swimming coach at North Sydney Olympic Pool after covering the swimming events at the 1956 Melbourne Olympics as a freelance journalist.

== Media career ==
Casey's career began at radio station 2KY in 1948. He became well known in the early years of television as a sports presenter on World of Sport (with Frank Hyde) at TCN-9 (Nine Network), and later as the sports newsreader at Channel TEN-10. He was also a talk-back host at Sydney radio stations 2KY, 2SM and 2GB, and was also a sports journalist at Sydney's The Daily Mirror newspaper for many years.

== Controversy ==
Although Casey was a successful sports media figure, he later stirred controversy as an often "politically incorrect" talk-back radio host, famous for his quick temper. He was suspended on several occasions during his career for offensive remarks made on radio.

In the 1980s, Casey became a vocal campaigner against increasing Asian immigration to Australia although he denied he was ever a racist. Said Casey:

"The conspiracy exists among prominent politicians to stifle any debate on the immigration issue, and among ethnic leaders in the community to diffuse any opposition to unlimited Asian immigration. The facts are plain to see. The majority of Australians are against it, but nothing is done to ensure their wishes are fulfilled. I spoke out and was vilified. Professor Blainey spoke out and lost his job. John Howard spoke out and was dumped as opposition leader. Bruce Ruxton spoke out and was labelled a racist looney."

In 1988, Casey was sacked by radio station 2KY after describing Asians on-air as "little bastards". The station's owner, the Labor Council of New South Wales, passed a motion at its conference that Casey must desist from "making statements inciting racial hatred, sexual assault and sexual harassment" while being employed by the station and thus associated with the Labor Council. 2KY general manager and Labor Party state president John MacBean said that he had re-hired Casey due to the loss of ratings and revenue, but also for his support for the labour movement and the Australian Labor Party.

On 16 July 1991, Casey was involved in a sensational incident on national television. During a republican debate on the Nine Network's Midday show hosted by Ray Martin, he became involved in a live on-air scuffle with singer and actor Normie Rowe during which Rowe pushed Casey into his chair, and Casey retaliated by punching Rowe in the face. The Victorian RSL chief Bruce Ruxton, who was on the set at the time of the brawl, said the next day: "As for Ron Casey, he deserved a good punch in the nose." (Despite the fact it was Casey who punched Rowe, not the other way around.)

In July 1995, Casey's interview with English author and Holocaust denier David Irving made news around the world when Irving said on air that between one and four million Jews had died in concentration camps—a figure far higher than Irving had ever conceded in the past or since, although he qualified this estimate by saying that barbarity and disease had caused the deaths.

In May 2000, Casey was suspended from radio station 2GB after saying that Aboriginal Australians were "disadvantaged because they won't get off their black arses and do some work". It was Casey's third suspension from the station, and the fourth time he had made racist comments on-air. Soon after, he retired from the Sydney media after a career that spanned 50 years.

He also openly admitted to routinely harassing women. On his show, he said, "Yesterday, Marcus Einfeld in the Human Rights and Equal Employment Opportunity Commission, said that his organisation was not a platform for vindictiveness or exaggerated allegations... [and] not to create a marketplace for exaggerated or imagined allegations against men. And I think Justice Marcus Einfeld is right on the button. So many of these cases ... they are ugly girls ... but I've always found whenever I've worked at various radio stations before getting the sack, that if you are nice to ugly girls, it sort of helps them—it boosts their day—it makes them feel good. And I've always made a practice wherever I work, of selecting the ugliest girls and as they walk by, give them a backhand pelvic flick."

== Confessions of a Larrikin ==
Casey published a memoir in 1989, titled Confessions of a Larrikin (ISBN 0949853275), which he co-wrote with Richard Sleeman.

== Honours ==
Casey was awarded the Medal of the Order of Australia on Australia Day 1988 for services to the media.

== Personal life ==
Casey married twice, first in 1954 and had two daughters; and again in 1966 to Renate Langkusch with whom he had a son and a daughter. He had numerous health problems in his eighties, including a quadruple heart bypass, several strokes and bladder cancer.

Casey died at Royal North Shore Hospital on 2 October 2018 aged 89.
