= Geoff Smith (Australian rugby league) =

Australian rugby league footballer

Personal information
- Full name: Geoffrey Robert Smith
- Born: 22 December 1952 (age 72) Concord, New South Wales, Australia

Playing information
- Position: Halfback
Club
Years	Team	Pld	T	G	FG	P
1974–77	Western Suburbs	25	2	0	0	6
1978–79	North Sydney	10	2	0	0	6
1982	South Sydney	1	0	0	0	0
	Total	36	4	0	0	12
- Source: As of 5 January 2023

Geoff Smith is an Australian former professional rugby league footballer who played in the 1970s and 1980s. He played for North Sydney, Western Suburbs and South Sydney in the NSWRFL competition.

== Playing career ==
Smith made his first grade debut for Western Suburbs in round 9 of the 1974 NSWRFL season against Canterbury-Bankstown at Lidcombe Oval. In 1977, Smith played in Western Suburbs 6-5 victory over Eastern Suburbs in the 1977 Amco Cup final at Leichhardt Oval. In 1978, Smith transferred to North Sydney but only featured in two matches that season. In 1979, Smith played eight matches for Norths as they finished bottom of the table with the Wooden Spoon. In 1982, Smith joined South Sydney but only played one game for the club which was in round 26 against Manly.
