= Terry Adams (rugby league) =

Australian rugby league footballer

Personal information
- Full name: Terry Adams

Playing information
- Position: Centre, Wing
Club
Years	Team	Pld	T	G	FG	P
1973–79	North Sydney	73	16	0	0	48
- Source: As of 13 November 2019

Terry Adams (born in Australia) was a rugby league footballer for North Sydney. He played first-grade rugby league for Norths between 1973 and 1979. He played three consecutive seasons with over 20 games between 1975 and 1977 but before and after those years played very little first grade rugby league.
