= Cec Waters =

Australian rugby league footballer

Personal information
- Full name: Cecil Waters
- Born: 13 March 1922 Kempsey, New South Wales, Australia
- Died: 6 August 1999 (aged 77)

Playing information
- Position: Lock, Second-row
Club
Years	Team	Pld	T	G	FG	P
1947–55	North Sydney	145	11	0	0	33
- Source: As of 26 February 2019
- Relatives: Alf Faull (cousin); Lloyd Hudson (cousin)

Cec Waters was an Australian rugby league footballer who played in the 1940s and 1950s. He played his entire career in the NSWRFL premiership for North Sydney. Waters was the cousin of fellow North Sydney players Alf Faull and Lloyd Hudson.

== Playing career ==
Waters began his first grade career with Norths in 1947. His first few seasons at Norths were difficult as the club finished last in 1948, 1950 and 1951.

In 1952, Norths appointed Ross McKinnon as coach. Norths reached preliminary finals in 1952 and 1953 and the semi-final in 1954 with Waters featuring in those finals campaigns as the club came close to reaching the grand final.

Waters retired at the end of the 1955 season as one of the club's longest serving players making a total of 145 appearances.
