= Os Deane =

Australian rugby league footballer

Personal information
- Full name: Thomas Oswald Deane
- Born: 1 January 1890 St Leonards, New South Wales
- Died: 10 June 1955 (aged 65) North Sydney, New South Wales

Playing information
- Position: Centre, Five-eighth, Halfback, Wing
Club
Years	Team	Pld	T	G	FG	P
1909–19	North Sydney	122	20	4	0	68
Representative
Years	Team	Pld	T	G	FG	P
1913	New South Wales	5	2	0	0	6
- Relatives: Sid Deane (brother)

Os Deane (1890–1955) was an Australian rugby league footballer who played in the 1900s and 1910s. He played in the NSWRFL premiership for North Sydney as a utility.

== Playing career ==
Deane began his first grade career in 1909 against Western Suburbs in a 5–5 draw. In 1913, Deane was selected to represent New South Wales when they toured New Zealand. Deane made 5 appearances on tour and scored two tries.

Deane was one of the club's longest serving players in the early years but his time at the club was not a successful one with the club failing to make the finals and finished last on the table twice.

Deane was the brother of Lal Deane who later became a referee and Sid Deane who represented Australia, New South Wales and was named in the North Sydney Bears team of the century.
