= Mark Soden =

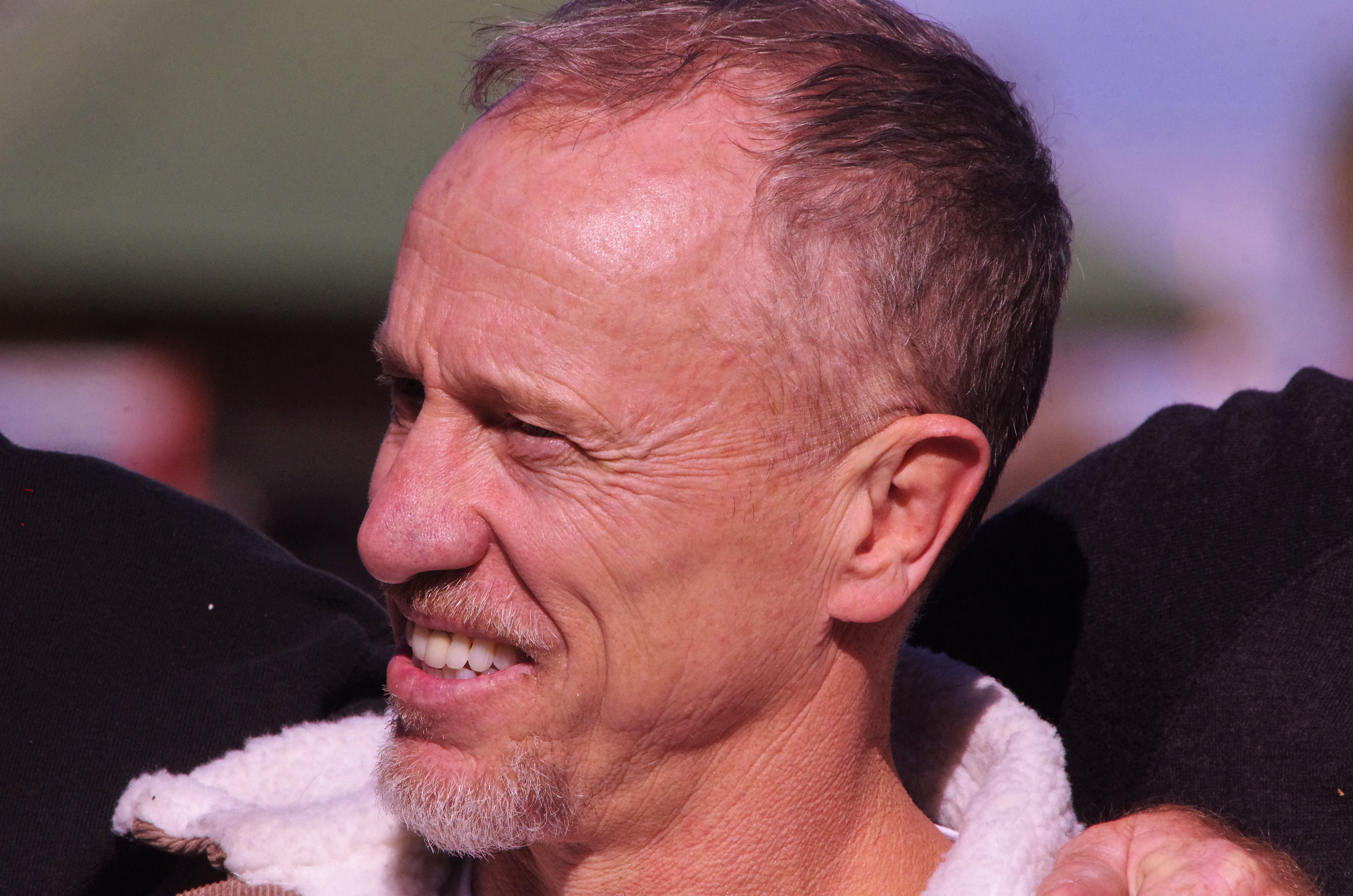

Personal information
- Born: 23 November 1968 (age 57) Dubbo, New South Wales, Australia

Playing information
- Position: Hooker, Halfback
Club
Years	Team	Pld	T	G	FG	P
1989–99	North Sydney Bears	170	28	1	1	115

Mark Soden (born 23 November 1968) is an Australian former professional rugby league footballer who played for the North Sydney Bears for eleven seasons.

== Early life ==
Soden, from Dubbo was captain of the 1986 Australian Schoolboys and played his first 2 years at the club in reserve grade behind Kiwi great Clayton Friend, until he made his first grade debut on 2 April 1989 against the Western Suburbs Magpies.

== Playing career ==
Soden, from Dubbo, NSW, primarily played halfback up until the 1994 NSWRL season when an injury to former captain Tony Rea gave Soden the chance to play at hooker. The advent of the ten-metre defensive rule in 1994 seemed tailor-made to Soden's nippiness around the rucks and smart kicking game which kept captain Tony Rea in reserve grade during the clubs run to the preliminary final that year. Soden was credited with changing the way dumby halves played, in particular his tactical kicking from the play the ball and clever running. Over the next 5 seasons, Soden was a mainstay of the North Sydney team and considered very unlucky not to play origin for NSW.

In 1996, he played 24 times and was in the side which lost to St. George in the preliminary final. The following year, Norths made the preliminary final again against Newcastle but missed the game due to a late season knee reconstruction. On 19 April 1998, Soden scored a controversial try against the Auckland Warriors involving a ball boy. Instead of placing the ball on the line to resume play, the ball boy threw the ball to Wade Horder who passed it to Soden who scored. The Auckland players were not aware of what was happening and Soden darted off to score the try. Now the ball boys have to place the ball on the sideline.

Soden's final game for Norths was against the North Queensland Cowboys in Townsville which would also prove the final game for the North Sydney Bears. In his final game he took the final shot at goal towards the end of the match which he successfully converted and consequently was the last points ever scored for the Bears who were a foundation club from 1908. In total Soden played 180 first grade games and scored 40 tries, he never played in a grand final but came close on three occasions in 1991, 1994 and 1996. Soden was a member of North's final campaigns in 1991, 1994, 1995, 1996, 1997 and 1998. In 2021, Soden was given the honour of life member along with North Sydney legend Mark Graham.
