= Wade Horder =

Australian rugby league footballer

Personal information
- Full name: Wade Horder
- Born: 6 December 1975 (age 50)

Playing information
- Position: Wing
Club
Years	Team	Pld	T	G	FG	P
1996–99	North Sydney Bears	16	7	0	0	28

Wade Horder (born 6 December 1975) is an Australian professional rugby league footballer who played for the North Sydney Bears in the National Rugby League. He played as a winger.

== Playing career ==
Horder made his debut for North Sydney in the 1996 ARL season against the Western Reds in round 11, coming off the bench in a 28-6 victory. This was the second Horder to play for North Sydney, the first being the winger and North Sydney "Team of the century" member Harold Horder. Wade Horder is the great nephew of Harold.

Horder scored his first try for Norths against the Sydney City Roosters on 28 March 1998 and then a week later scored a hat-trick against St. George. In round 6, against the Auckland Warriors, Horder was involved in a controversial try involving a ball boy. Instead of the ball boy placing the ball on the line, Horder called for the ball which was thrown to him from the touchline, Horder passed it to North Sydney hooker Mark Soden who raced away to score as Auckland did not know what was happening and were not ready. Horder was a member of the 1999 North Sydney squad and played in the final game that North Sydney ever played in first grade: against the North Queensland Cowboys in Townsville. Norths won the match 28-18.
