= Don McKinnon (rugby league) =

Australia international rugby league footballer

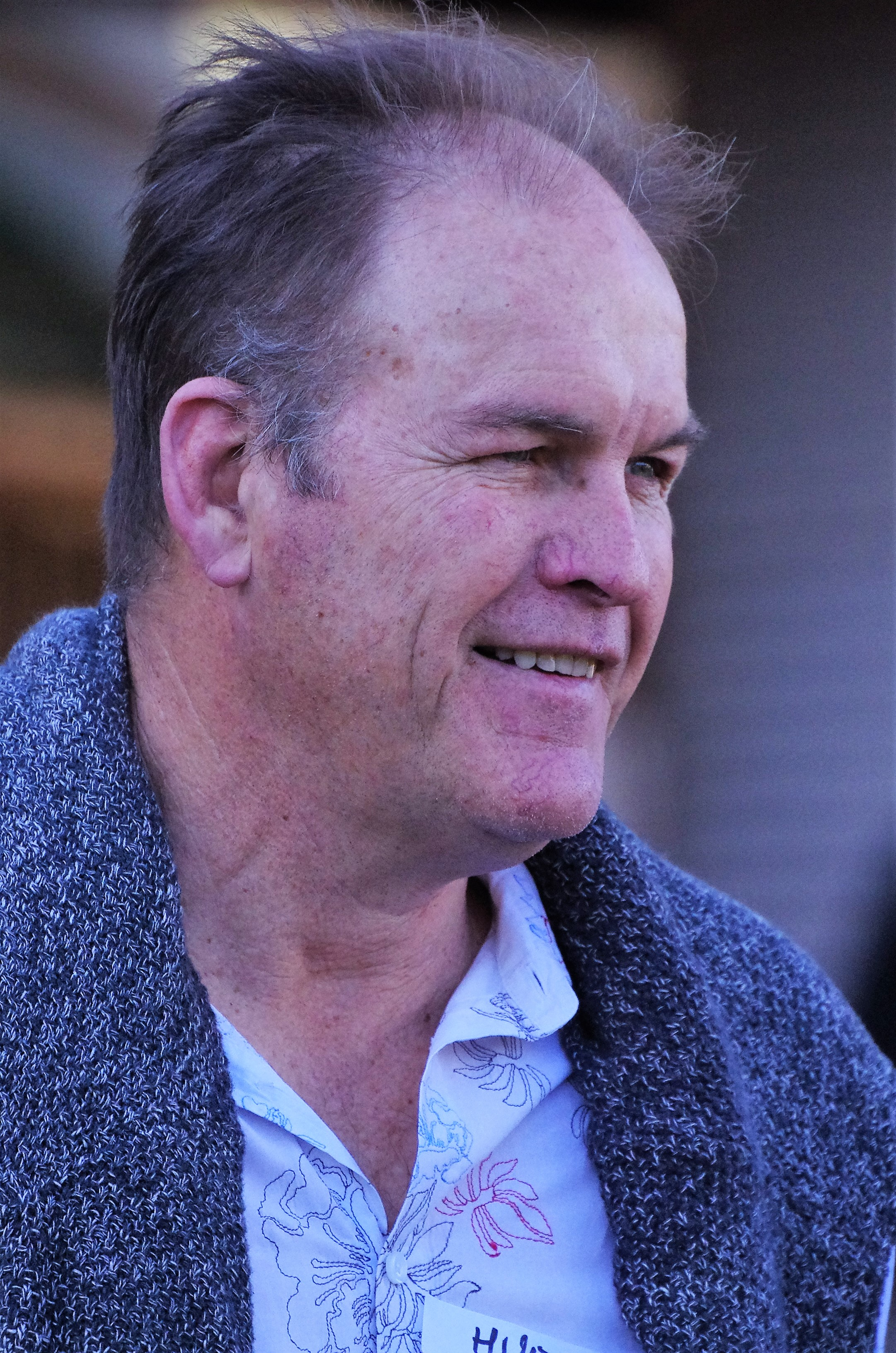

Personal information
- Full name: Donald McKinnon
- Born: 29 April 1955 (age 71)

Playing information
- Height: 193 cm (6 ft 4 in)
- Weight: 103 kg (16 st 3 lb)
- Position: Prop
Club
Years	Team	Pld	T	G	FG	P
1977–87	North Sydney Bears	189	28	0	0	93
1988	Manly Sea Eagles	6	1	0	0	4
	Total	195	29	0	0	97
Representative
Years	Team	Pld	T	G	FG	P
1982	New South Wales	1	0	0	0	0
1982	Australia	1	1	1	0	5
- Education: North Sydney Boys High School
- Father: Harry McKinnon

Don McKinnon (born 29 April 1955) is an Australian former professional rugby league footballer who played in the 1970s and 1980s. He was educated at North Sydney Boys High School. He played for the North Sydney Bears in the New South Wales Rugby Football League premiership as well as the Manly-Warringah Sea Eagles, and represented New South Wales and Australia. McKinnon only played as a Front-row Forward.

== Career ==
=== North Sydney Bears ===
McKinnon made his first grade debut for North Sydney under the coaching of former Manly-Warringah dual Grand Final winning Prop forward (1972 and 1973) and 1973 Kangaroo tourist Bill Hamilton. He would go on to play 183 games for the Bears between 1977 and 1987, scoring 28 tries.

=== Manly-Warringah Sea Eagles ===
He then signed to play with Manly in 1988 and played in six games, scoring one try. He was fined $10,000 for urinating on the field during the Sea Eagles clash with the Brisbane Broncos at Lang Park in round 1, 1988. While McKinnon wasn't the first player to have done this, he was the first to be caught on television. Later in the same game he dislocated his shoulder while scoring a try and upon his return from injury, couldn't force his way back into the Bob Fulton coached side and spent the rest of the season playing Reserve Grade. He went on to play in the Sea Eagles Reserve Grade Grand Final win at the end of the year. Following the Reserve Grade Grand Final, McKinnon announced his retirement from the game.

== Representative career ==
=== New South Wales ===
McKinnon gained his first representative jumper when he was selected to represent Sydney Seconds v Country Seconds in 1978, scoring 3 tries in that match. He again represented Sydney Seconds in 1980 and 1981. He was selected for New South Wales for Game 3 of the 1982 State of Origin series at the Sydney Cricket Ground, won 10-5 by Queensland. He ran for 200 metres with the ball in his one appearance, the highest average for any NSW player.

=== 1982 Kangaroo Tour ===
Following the 1982 NSWRFL season, in which the Bears finished in a strong 3rd place, McKinnon was selected for the 1982 Kangaroo tour of Great Britain and France. His selection coming along with winning the Dally M Prop of the year. McKinnon went on to play in 10 minor games on tour, scoring 3 tries and kicking one goal in his only 'international' appearance when The Invincibles (as the touring team became known) defeated Wales in a non-test match 37–7 in front of 5,617 fans at Ninian Park in Cardiff.

== Family ==
McKinnon is a member of a famous footballing family. His father Harry, his uncle Donald and older brothers Doug and Max all played rugby league for the Bears.

== Post-playing ==
Following his retirement, Don McKinnon served on the National Rugby League judiciary.
