= Bob Sullivan (rugby league) =

Australian RL coach and former Australia international rugby league footballer

Personal information
- Full name: Robert William Sullivan
- Born: 1931
- Died: 2 March 2009 (aged 77–78)

Playing information
- Position: Five-eighth
Club
Years	Team	Pld	T	G	FG	P
1949–57	North Sydney	122	42	4	0	134
Representative
Years	Team	Pld	T	G	FG	P
1954	New South Wales	2	2	0	0	6
1954	Australia	1	0	0	0	0

Coaching information
Club
Years	Team	Gms	W	D	L	W%
1961–62	North Sydney	36	13	2	21	36
- Father: Con Sullivan
- Relatives: Sid Deane (uncle)

Bob Sullivan (1931-2009) was an Australian rugby league footballer who played in the 1940s and 1950s. He played in the NSWRFL premiership for North Sydney as a five-eighth.

== Playing career ==
Sullivan began his first grade career in 1949 with North Sydney. In the early 1950s, Sullivan was a member of the North Sydney sides which reached the preliminary finals but fell short of a grand final appearance. In 1954, Sullivan was selected to play for Australia against Great Britain and in the same year was selected to play for New South Wales in the interstate series against Queensland. Sullivan played with North Sydney up until the end of 1959 where he captained North Sydney to a reserve grade premiership, his last game in first grade was during the 1957 season. Sullivan was the son of former North Sydney player Con Sullivan and the nephew of Sid Deane who is a member of the North Sydney Bears team of the century.

== Post playing ==
Sullivan was later a long serving president of the North Sydney club and was inducted as a life member. Sullivan also coached North Sydney between 1961 and 1962 with limited success.

Sporting positions
Preceded by Greg Hawick; 1960	Coach North Sydney; 1961–1962	Succeeded by Fred Griffiths; 1963–1966
