= Jack Baker (rugby league) =

Australian rugby league footballer

Personal information
- Full name: Reuben John Baker
- Born: 19 August 1890 Picton, New South Wales, Australia
- Died: 29 January 1947 (aged 56) North Sydney, New South Wales, Australia

Playing information
- Position: Second-row
Club
Years	Team	Pld	T	G	FG	P
1919–20	South Sydney	24	5	0	0	15
1921–23	North Sydney	32	3	0	0	9
	Total	56	8	0	0	24

Jack Baker (1890 – 1947) was an Australian rugby league footballer who played in the 1910s and 1920s. He played in the NSWRFL premiership for the North Sydney and South Sydney clubs. His position was at second-row.

== Playing career ==
Baker made his first grade debut for South Sydney against Annandale in Round 2 1919 which finished in an 8–8 draw at Wentworth Park. Baker spent two years at Souths before signing with North Sydney.

Baker was a member of Norths only premiership victories in 1921 and 1922. He played in the 1922 grand final against Glebe where Norths won 35–3 at The Sydney Cricket Ground.

== Post playing ==
After retirement, Baker worked as a police sergeant.

== Death ==
Baker died while living at North Sydney in 1947.
