= Norm Strong =

Australian rugby league footballer

Personal information
- Full name: Norman Strong, OAM
- Born: 1929 Sydney, New South Wales, Australia
- Died: 2026 (aged 96–97)

Playing information
- Position: Hooker
Club
Years	Team	Pld	T	G	FG	P
1949–62	North Sydney	210	10	0	0	30

Norm Strong was an Australian professional rugby league footballer who played in the 1940s, 1950s and 1960s. He played in the NSWRFL premiership for North Sydney as a hooker.

== Playing career ==
Strong began his first grade career in 1949. Strong was a member of the North's teams in the 1950s where the club made the preliminary finals in 1952 and 1953 but lost to South Sydney Rabbitohs and the semi-finals in 1954 where they lost to St. George Dragons. Strong is credited by some for being one of the first players in rugby league to wear a mouth guard when the player began wearing one in the mid 1950s. Strong played a total of 210 games for Norths and was the club's record appearance holder until Greg Florimo broke the record in 1997. Strong initially retired from the game in 1961 but was talked into playing for another season by club president Harry McKinnon. Speaking in 2008, Strong spoke to the media "I told (president) Harry McKinnon my inner ears were crook and packing into scrums didn't help, Harry said if I played another season the club would pay for the operation on my ears. So I did".

== Death ==
In July 2026, the North Sydney Bears announced that Strong had passed away.
