= Sid Deane =

Australia international rugby league footballer (1885–1967)

Personal information
- Full name: Sidney Phillip Deane
- Born: 21 March 1885 North Sydney, New South Wales, Australia
- Died: 19 October 1967 (aged 82) Dee Why, New South Wales, Australia

Playing information
- Position: Centre, Five-eighth
Club
Years	Team	Pld	T	G	FG	P
1908	North Sydney	9	1	0	0	3
1908–11	Oldham	103	35	0	0	105
1912–14	North Sydney	21	6	0	0	18
1915–16	Hull FC	21	4	0	0	12
1917–19	North Sydney	6	0	0	0	0
	Total	160	46	0	0	138
Representative
Years	Team	Pld	T	G	FG	P
1908–14	New South Wales	18	14	1	0	44
1908–14	Australia	5	1	0	0	3
1914	Metropolis	1	1	0	0	3
- Relatives: Os Deane (brother); Bob Sullivan (nephew); Con Sullivan (brother-in-law)

Sid Deane (21 March 1885 – 19 October 1967) was a foundation Australian rugby league player. He was a centre for the Australia national team. He played in five rests between 1908 and 1914. In 1914 he became the ninth Australian national captain and the first from the North Sydney Club.

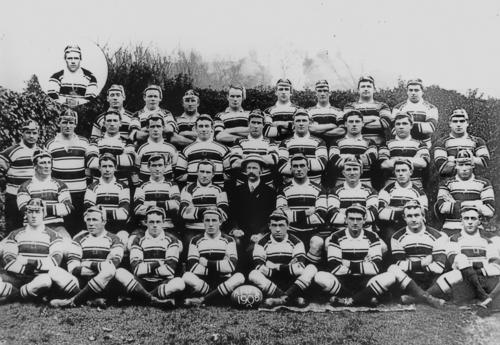
Deane (back row 3rd from right) Kangaroos 1908-09

== Club career ==
Born in North Sydney, he commenced his footballing career with Norths rugby union. He was present at the North Sydney School of Arts in 1907 for the meeting which founded North Sydney. He was elected onto the players committee and played at five-eighth in the inaugural round of rugby league matches played in Sydney on 20 April 1908.

Following his appearances for Australia on the inaugural Kangaroo tour of England in 1908 several English clubs made offers for him to stay and he reached agreement with the Oldham. For the next four seasons he featured in a star-studded team including Arthur Anlezark, Kangaroo Tom McCabe and English representatives James "Jim" Lomas, Alf Wood and Albert Avery. Oldham were Championship finalists for each of those four years. Deane played at centre in Oldham's 3–7 defeat by Wigan in the Championship Final during the 1908–09 season at The Willows, Salford on Saturday 1 May 1909, played, and was captain in Oldham's 13–7 victory over Wigan in the Championship Final during the 1909–10 season, and played, and was captain in Oldham's 20–7 victory over Wigan in the Championship Final during the 1910–11 season.

He had further seasons with North Sydney from 1912 to 1914, then returned to England to play with Hull FC for the 1914–15 season. He finished his career with North Sydney in 1919.

In August, 2006 Deane was named in the North Sydney Bears' Team of the Century.

== Representative career ==
He made his representative début for New South Wales in May 1908 against the New Zealand "All Golds" and later that year for a NSW side against the NZ Maori. In July Deane was selected in the Pioneer Kangaroo side to tour England and made his international début in the centres alongside Dally Messenger in the first Ashes test on 22 November 1908.

Following Deane's return from the English competition in 1912 he again represented New South Wales against touring New Zealand and English sides.

During the 1914 Great Britain Lions tour of Australia and New Zealand Deane captained the Kangaroos in all three Ashes tests. Australia won the second test in July 1914 12–7. This was the first rugby league test played at the Sydney Cricket Ground and the first Australian home victory against the English.

== After football ==
Deane's wider family contributed to the development of rugby league in Australia. His brothers Os and Lal both played for North Sydney. Os Deane represented New South Wales and Lal became a first grade and representative level referee. Deane's sister married his North Sydney and Australia teammate Con Sullivan and their son, Bob went on to represent Australia in 1954, and both he and another nephew Jack played for Norths.

After retirement he helped run the family sports store and billiards room in North Sydney and was an SP bookmaker in later life.

== Matches played ==
Team	Matches	Years
Club		
North Sydney	35	1908–1919
Australia (tests)	5	1908–1914

== Sources ==
- Whiticker, Alan (2004) Captaining the Kangaroos, New Holland, Sydney
- Andrews, Malcolm (2006) The ABC of Rugby League, Austn Broadcasting Corpn, Sydney

Preceded by Chris McKivat	Australian national rugby league captain 1919	Succeeded by Arthur Halloway
