= Mick Maher =

Australian rugby league footballer

Personal information
- Full name: Michael Anthony Maher
- Born: Sydney, New South Wales, Australia
- Died: 27 July 2009 Sydney, New South Wales, Australia

Playing information
- Position: Fullback, Wing
Club
Years	Team	Pld	T	G	FG	P
1960–70	North Sydney	125	23	0	0	69
- Relatives: Pat Maher (uncle)

Mick Maher was an Australian rugby league footballer who played in the 1960s and 1970s. He played in the NSWRFL premiership for North Sydney as a fullback and also as a winger.

== Playing career ==
A Mosman junior, who played alongside Ken Irvine in his younger years, Maher made his first grade debut for North Sydney in 1960. In the ten seasons that Maher played for Norths, the club only qualified for the finals on two occasions which were in 1964 where Norths lost to Balmain and in 1965 where Norths finished second on the table at the end of the regular season but bowed out in consecutive games during the finals series. In 1967, Maher became the first choice fullback after the retirement of Fred Griffiths. Maher retired at the end of the 1970 season. He died on 27 July 2009.
