= Bill Whitfield =

Australia international rugby league footballer

Personal information
- Full name: William Charles Edward Whitfield
- Born: 16 October 1884
- Died: 12 May 1958 (aged 73) Newcastle, New South Wales, Australia

Playing information
- Position: Fullback
Club
Years	Team	Pld	T	G	FG	P
1908–15	North Sydney	19	0	7	1	16
Representative
Years	Team	Pld	T	G	FG	P
1908–09	New South Wales	3	0	0	0	0
1909–09	Australia	1	0	0	0	0
- Source: As of 13 February 2019

Bill Whitfield (1884–1958) was an Australian rugby league footballer who played in the 1900s and 1910s. He played for North Sydney in the NSWRL competition and was a foundation player of the club.

== Playing career ==
Whitfield played in North Sydney's first ever game against South Sydney on April 20, 1908 at Birchgrove Oval.

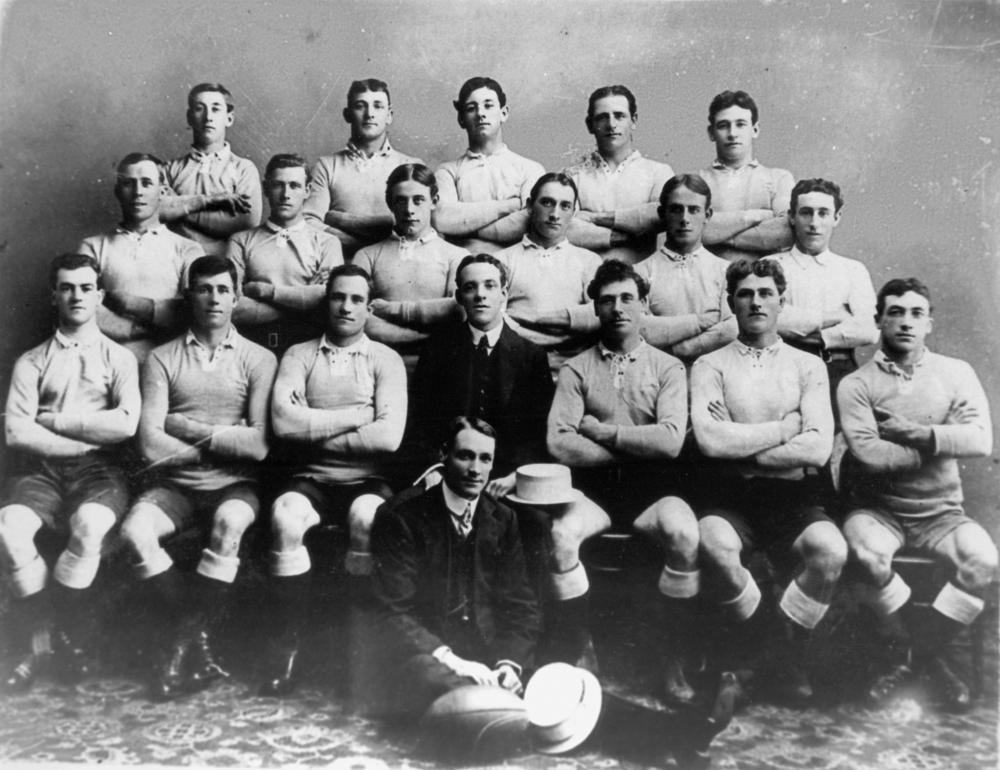
New South Wales team in 1910

Whitfield played 3 games for New South Wales between 1908 and 1909 and played 1 match for Australia in 1909.
