= Harry McKinnon =

Australian RL coach and former rugby league footballer

Personal information
- Full name: Rawdon Henry McKinnon
- Born: 16 March 1910; Tamworth, New South Wales, Australia
- Died: 15 October 1989 (aged 79); Willoughby, New South Wales, Australia

Playing information
- Position: Prop
Club
Years	Team	Pld	T	G	FG	P
1936–45	North Sydney	127	7	0	0	21

Coaching information
Club
Years	Team	Gms	W	D	L	W%
1949	North Sydney	18	5	1	12	28
- Source: Whiticker/Hudson
- Relatives: Don McKinnon (son)

Rawdon Henry McKinnon (1910–1989) was an Australian professional rugby league footballer, coach and administrator.

== Background ==
McKinnon was born in Tamworth in 1910, the son of Henry and Agnes McKinnon.

== Playing career ==
A prop-forward, he played for North Sydney for ten seasons between 1936 and 1945, including the 1943 Grand Final loss to Newtown then devoted a lifetime of service to the club.

== Post playing ==
After retiring as a player, McKinnon coached North Sydney's first grade team in 1949, and then became involved with administration at the Bears until his retirement as Club President in 1979. He is also the father of former North Sydney, Manly-Warringah Sea Eagles and Australian representative prop-forward Don McKinnon.

A life member of North Sydney and the NSWRFL, Harry McKinnon was also awarded the Order of the British Empire Medal in 1971.

McKinnon died on 15 October 1989, aged 79.

Sporting positions
Preceded by Cliff Pearce; 1947–1948	Coach North Sydney; 1949	Succeeded by Frank Hyde; 1950
