= Edward Boland (rugby league) =

Australian rugby league footballer

Edmund Boland
Personal information
- Full name: Edmund Eugene Boland
- Born: 7 September 1884; Parramatta, New South Wales, Australia
- Died: 10 November 1954 (aged 70)

Playing information
- Position: Second-row, Prop, Hooker
Club
| Years | Team | Pld | T | G | FG | P |
|---|---|---|---|---|---|---|
| 1909–16 | North Sydney | 39 | 1 | 0 | 0 | 3 |
- Source: As of 13 February 2019

Edmund Boland was an Australian rugby league footballer who played in the 1900s and 1910s. He played for North Sydney and played in 1 match for Cumberland. Boland was a foundation player for North Sydney and served on the committee when the club was first admitted into the league. His older brother Michael "Paddy" Boland played one game for Cumberland rugby league team.

== Playing career ==
Boland played in North Sydney's first ever game which was in Round 1 1908 against South Sydney at Birchgrove Oval with the game ending in a 11–7 loss.

Boland also played 1 match for Cumberland in 1908 against Norths. Cumberland attended the match with only 11 players from a required 13. Boland was one of the players who decided to join Cumberland for the match so the game could be played. Norths won the match 45–0 at Wentworth Park and this would prove to be Cumberland's last ever match before disbanding.

Boland played with North Sydney up until the end of 1916 but did not play in the 1914 or 1915 seasons due to his involvement in World War 1.
