= Joe Kendall (rugby league) =

Australian rugby league footballer

Personal information
- Full name: Walter Augustus Kendall
- Born: 26 April 1882; St Leonards, New South Wales, Australia
- Died: 17 February 1958 (aged 75); North Sydney, New South Wales

Playing information
- Position: Hooker, Prop, Second-row, Lock
Club
Years	Team	Pld	T	G	FG	P
1908–10	North Sydney	21	2	1	0	8
Representative
Years	Team	Pld	T	G	FG	P
1909	Australia	1	0	0	0	0
- Source: As of 14 February 2019

Walter Augustus Kendall also known as Joe Kendall (1882–1958) was an Australian rugby league footballer who played in the 1900s and 1910s. He played for North Sydney in the NSWRL competition and was a foundation player of the club.

== Background ==
Kendall was born in St Leonards, New South Wales on 26 April 1882.

== Playing career ==
Kendall played in North Sydney's first ever game against South Sydney on April 20, 1908, at Birchgrove Oval.

Kendall played representative football with Australia in 1909 featuring in 1 game. Kendall also played 1 game for Metropolis in 1908.

Kendall played with Norths until the end of 1910 before retiring from rugby league.
