= 1943 NSWRFL season =

Rugby league competition

1943 New South Wales Rugby Football League
- Teams: 8
- Premiers: Newtown (3rd title)
- Minor premiers: Newtown (3rd title)
- Matches played: 61
- Points scored: 1527
- Top points scorer: Tom Kirk (116)
- Wooden spoon: Canterbury-Bankstown (1st spoon)
- Top try-scorer: Cyril McMahon (12)

The 1943 New South Wales Rugby Football League premiership was the thirty-sixth season of Sydney's top-level rugby league competition, Australia's first. Eight teams from across the city contested during the season which lasted from April until September, culminating in the Newtown club's Grand Final victory over North Sydney.

== Season summary ==
The season is notable for Newtown turning around their second-last placing from the previous season, becoming minor premiers and later premiers. On the other hand, defending premiers Canterbury-Bankstown had a disastrous season, finishing last and picking up the wooden spoon for the first of only six occasions to date. Eastern Suburbs also slumped from the four to their lowest placing and poorest record since 1929, and were not to recover their former prominence until the late 1960s.

=== Teams ===
- Balmain, formed on 23 January 1908 at Balmain Town Hall
- Canterbury-Bankstown, formed on 24 September 1935 in Belmore, Canterbury-Bankstown
- Eastern Suburbs, formed on 24 January 1908 at Paddington Town Hall
- Newtown, formed on 8 January 1908 at Newtown Town Hall
- North Sydney, formed on 7 February 1908
- South Sydney, formed on 17 January 1908 at Redfern Town Hall
- St. George, formed on 8 November 1920 at Kogarah School of Arts
- Western Suburbs, formed on 4 February 1908

For the new season, proposals were made to change the jerseys of the clubs to a single colour. With the exception of South Sydney, who had a sufficient number of their traditional myrtle and cardinal jersey's, the other clubs had each submitted a single colour to the league. St George were to play in white, Balmain in canary yellow, Eastern Suburbs in green, Canterbury-Bankstown in maroon, North Sydney in scarlet, Western Suburbs in black and Newtown in their traditional royal blue.

Due to the on-going war, certain dyes and patterns were becoming expensive and hard to obtain. Jerseys with stripes, especially the popular "butcher stripes" that had been used by many clubs, were more expensive to manufacture. Materials and certain dyes, such as navy, were either rationed or used exclusively by the defence forces. As a result, jerseys became much simpler with the V pattern becoming a common design.

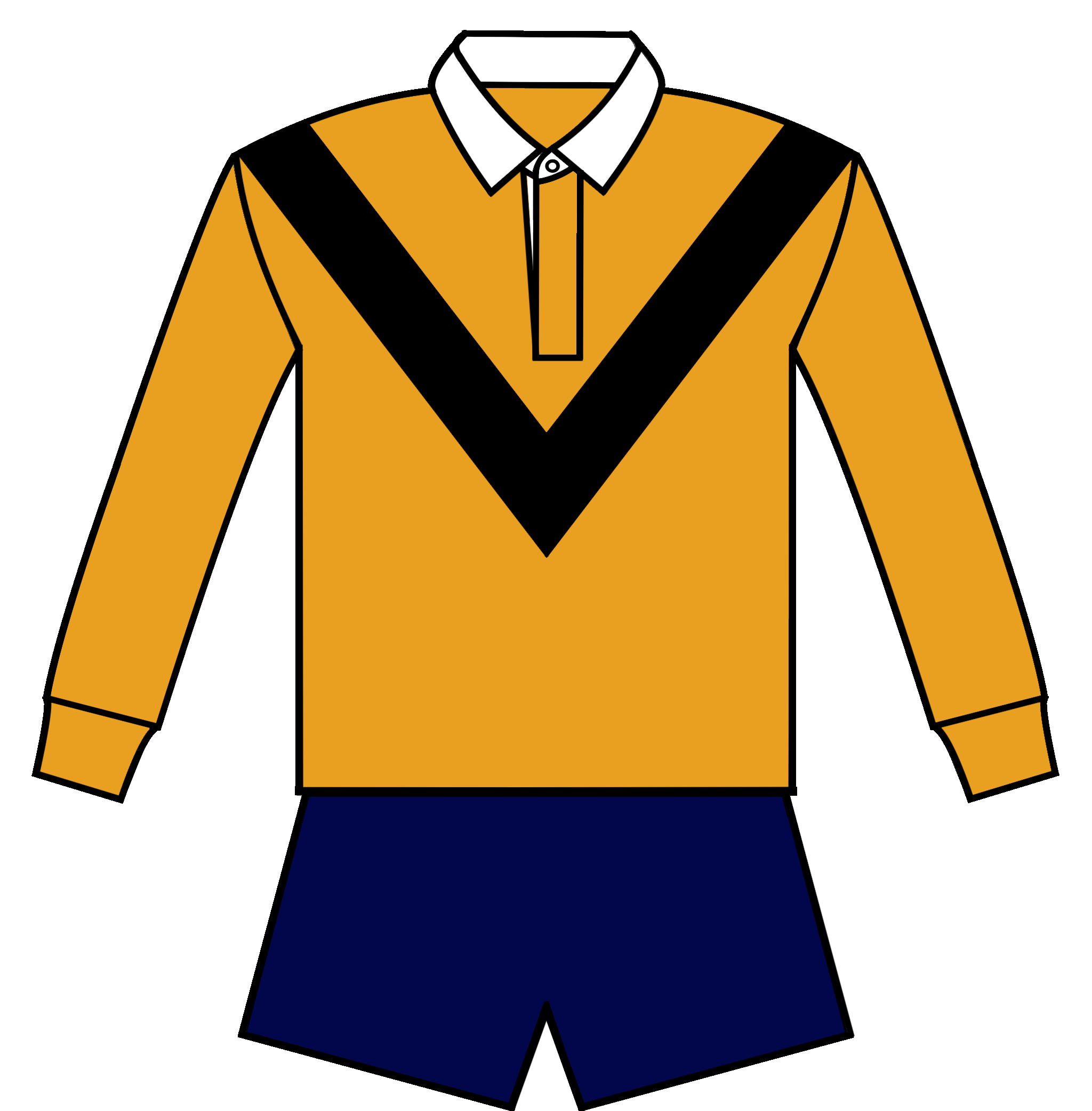
Balmain 36th season Ground: Leichhardt Oval; Coach: Bill Kelly; Captain: Merv Denton

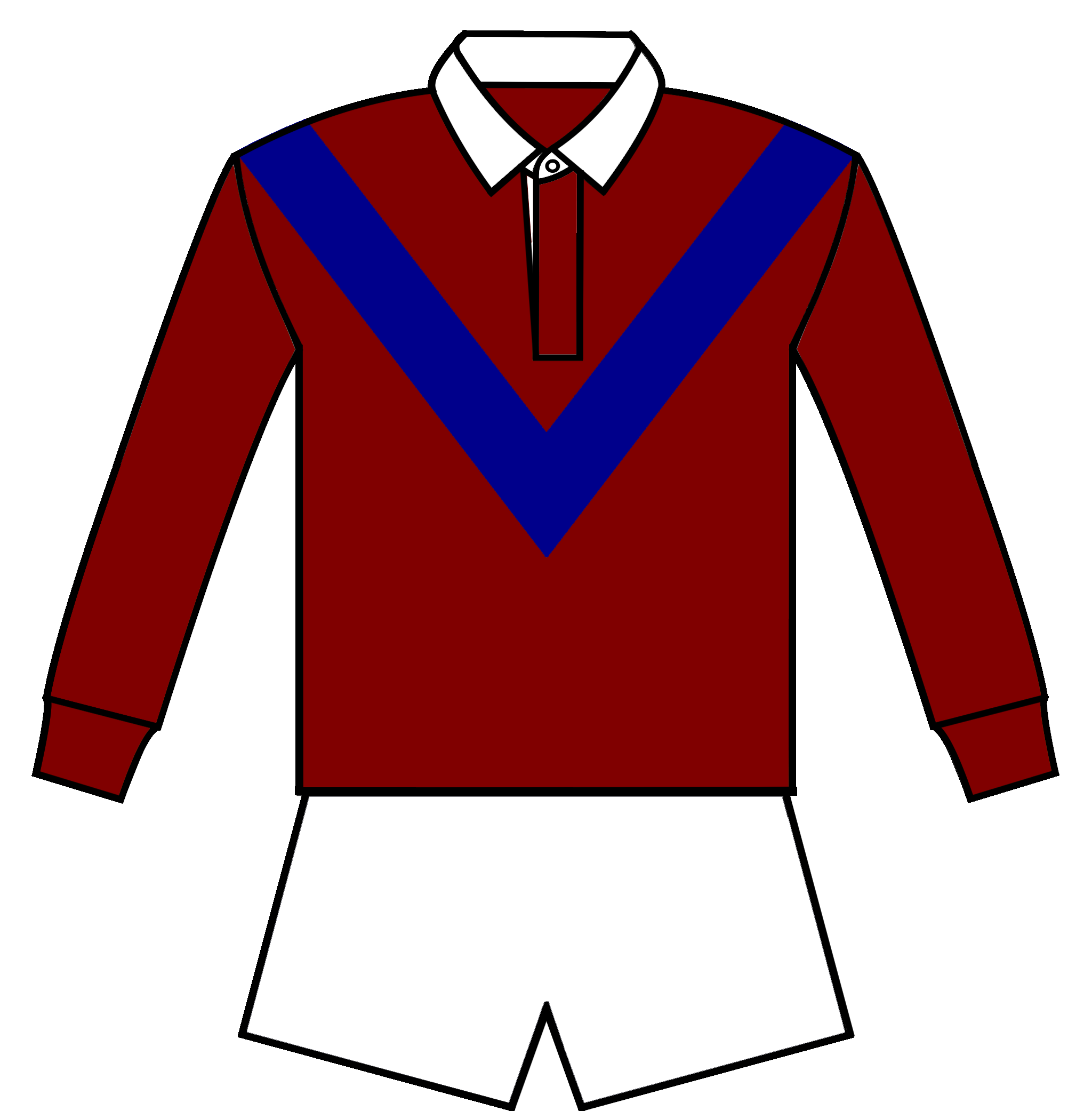
Canterbury-Bankstown 9th season Ground: Belmore Oval; Captain-coach: Roy Kirkaldy

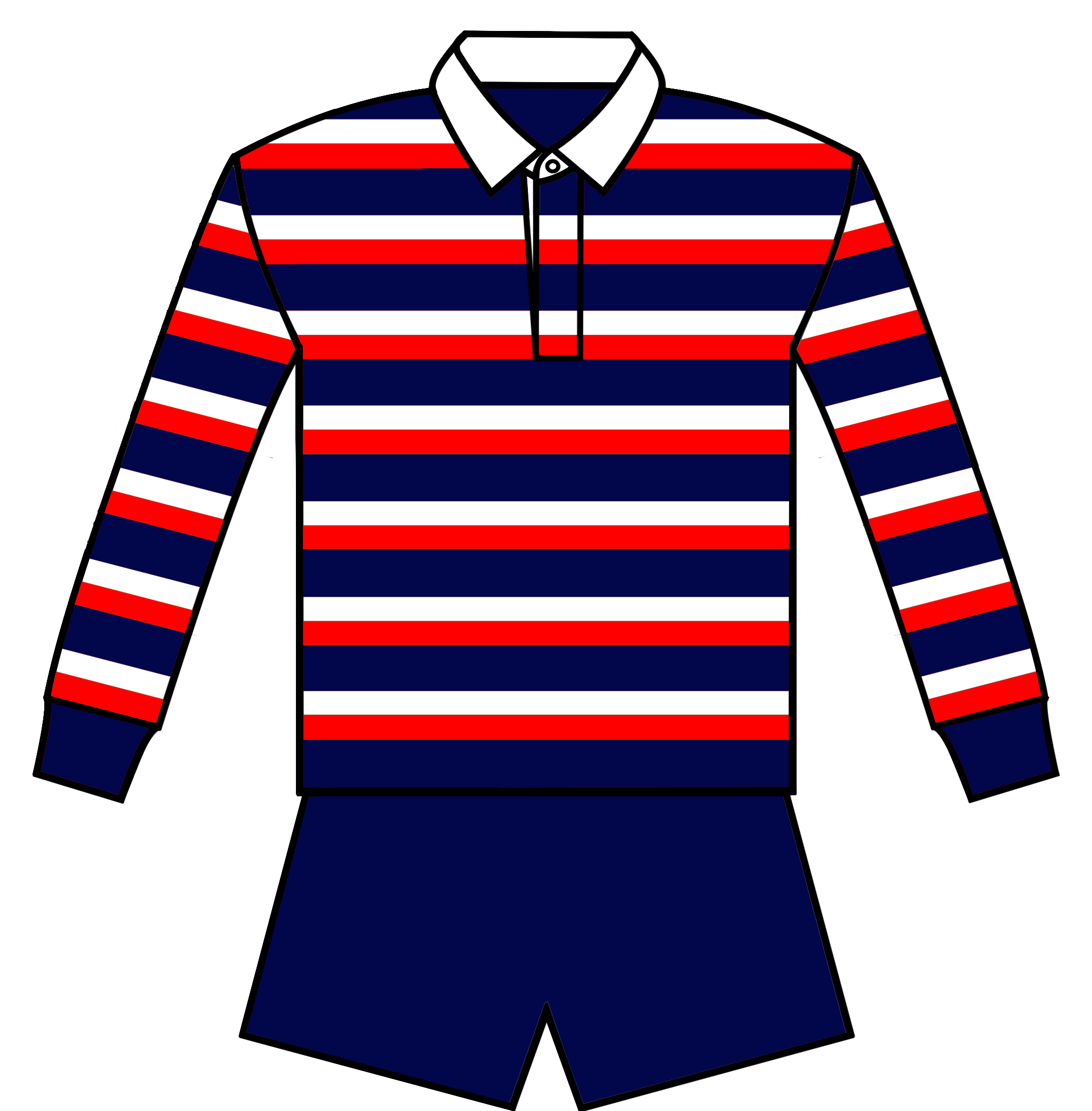
Eastern Suburbs 36th season Ground: Sports Ground; Coach: Dave Brown; Captain: Harry Pierce

Newtown 36th season Ground: Henson Park; Coach: Arthur Folwell; Captain: Frank Farrell

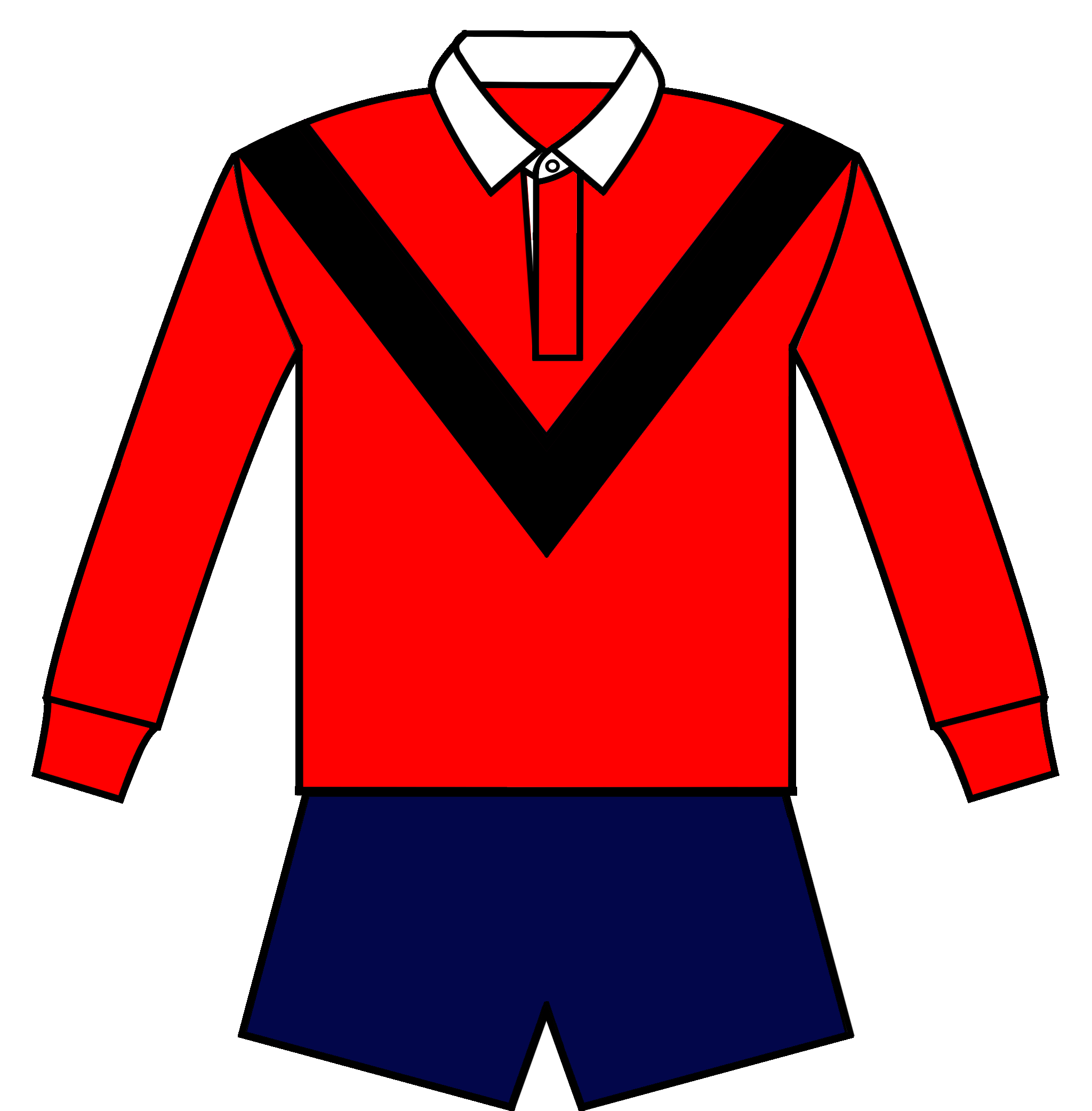
North Sydney 36th season Ground: North Sydney Oval; Captain-coach: Frank Hyde

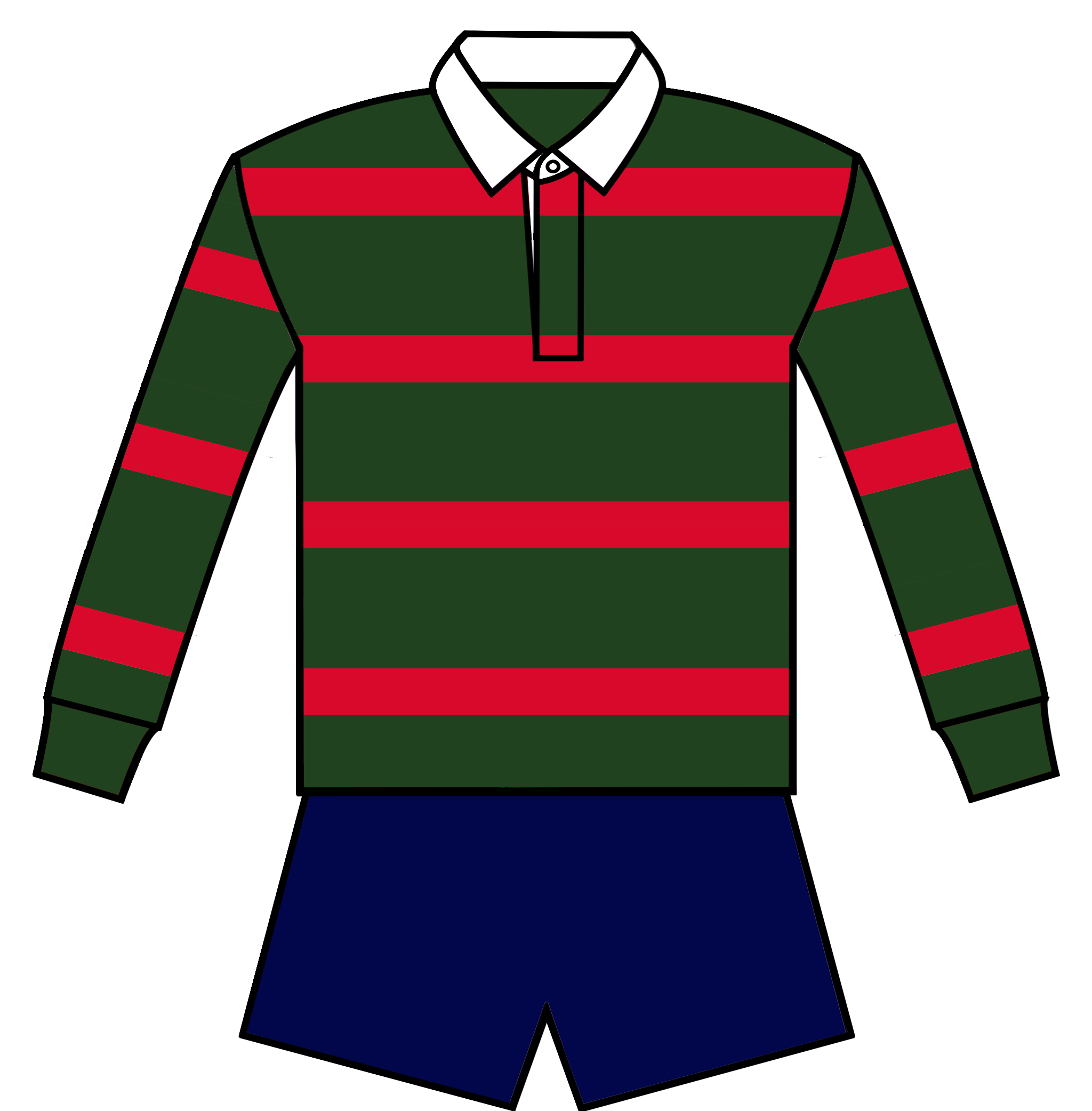
South Sydney 36th season Ground: Sports Ground; Coach: Jim Tait

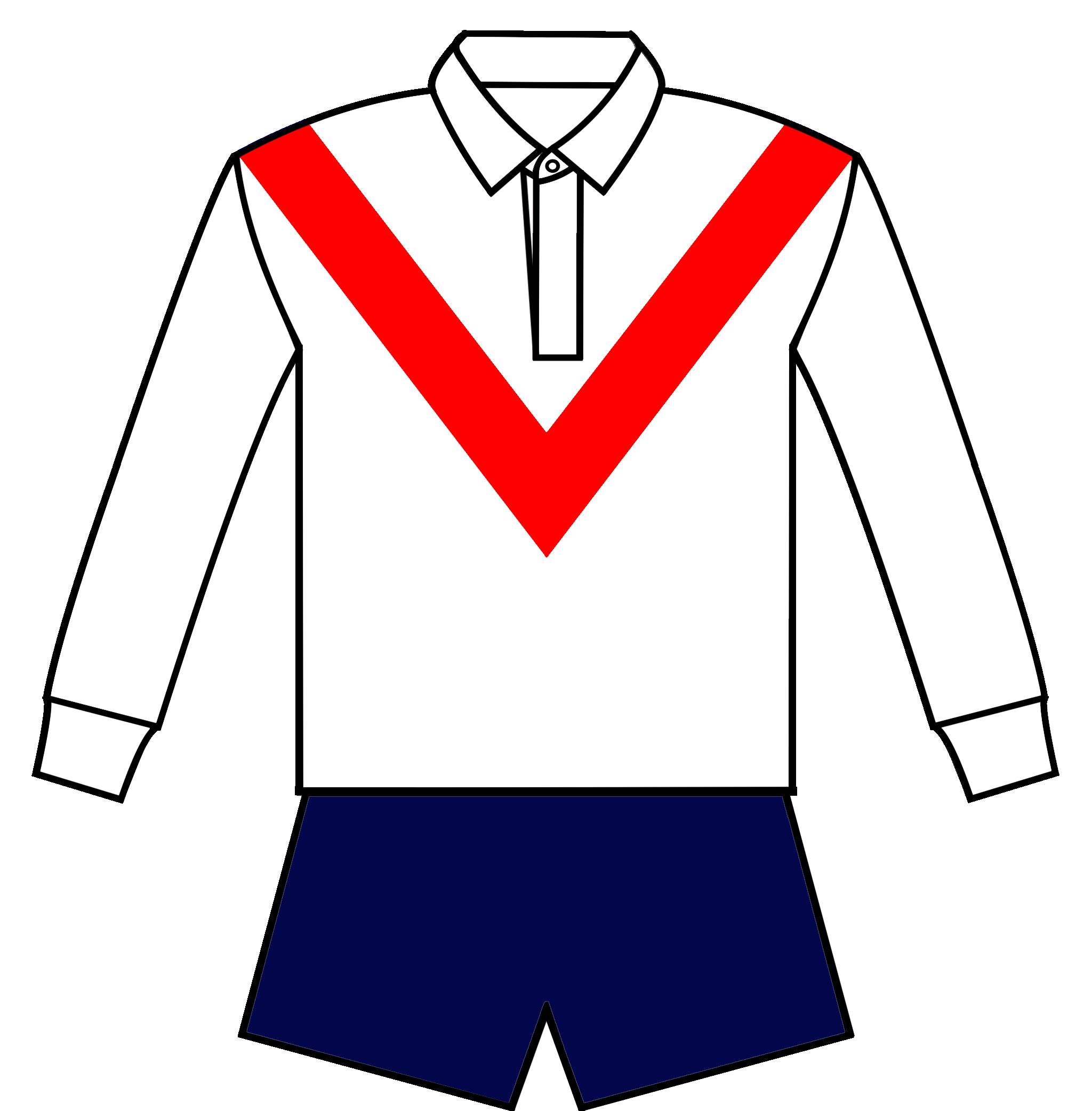
St. George 23rd season Ground: Hurstville Oval; Captain-coach: Neville Smith

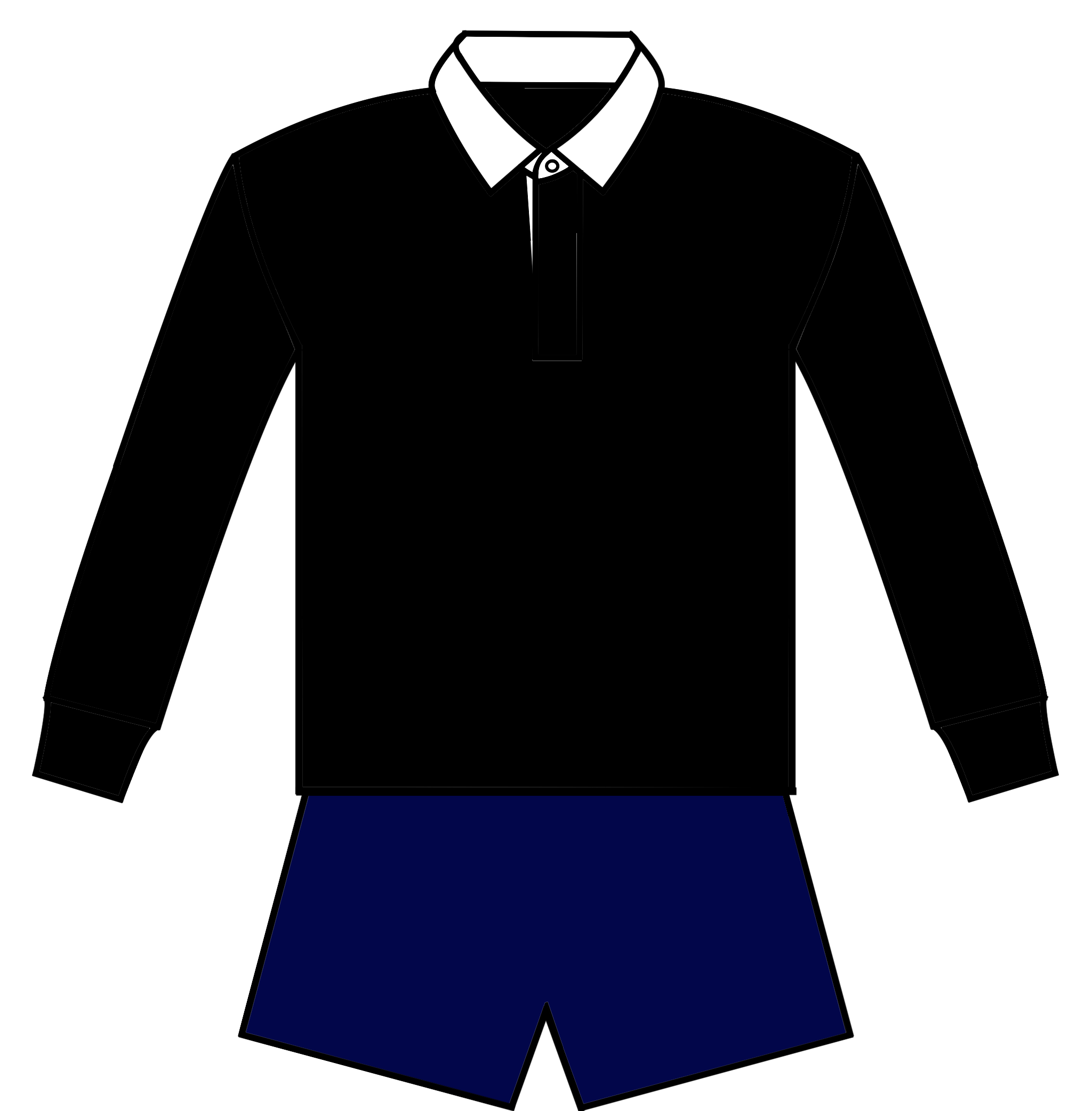
Western Suburbs 36th season Ground: Pratten Park; Coach: Alf Blair; Captain: Jack Whitehurst, Eric Bennett

== Regular season ==
| Team | 1 | 2 | 3 | 4 | 5 | 6 | 7 | 8 | 9 | 10 | 11 | 12 | 13 | 14 | F1 | F2 | F3 | F4 | GF |
|---|---|---|---|---|---|---|---|---|---|---|---|---|---|---|---|---|---|---|---|
| Balmain | **WES** **+4** | SOU −12 | EAS −12 | **NEW** **+12** | **CBY** **+3** | **STG** **+2** | NOR; 0 | **SOU** **+14** | **EAS** **+12** | NEW −28 | CBY +33 | **STG** **+6** | **NOR** **+8** | WES +5 | NEW −1 | X | **STG** **−7** | | |
| Canterbury-Bankstown | EAS +8 | NOR −6 | **NEW** **−27** | **WES** **−11** | BAL −3 | **SOU** **−10** | **STG** **−8** | NOR −25 | NEW −18 | WES +8 | **BAL** **−33** | SOU −2 | STG −5 | **EAS** **+3** | | | | | |
| Eastern Suburbs | **CBY** **−8** | NEW −19 | **BAL** **+12** | **STG** **+20** | NOR −8 | **WES** **+5** | SOU +2 | **NEW** **−6** | BAL −12 | **STG** **−2** | **NOR** **−14** | WES −16 | **SOU** **−34** | CBY −3 | | | | | |
| Newtown | **SOU** **+17** | **EAS** **+19** | CBY +27 | BAL −12 | **STG** **−1** | **NOR**; **0** | **WES** **+4** | EAS +6 | **CBY** **+18** | **BAL** **+28** | **STG** **+13** | NOR −6 | WES +1 | SOU +15 | **BAL** **+1** | **NOR** **−5** | X | X | **NOR** **+27** |
| North Sydney | **STG** **−1** | **CBY** **+6** | **WES** **−3** | SOU −3 | **EAS** **+8** | NEW; 0 | **BAL**; **0** | **CBY** **+25** | WES +18 | **SOU** **+7** | EAS +14 | **NEW** **+6** | BAL −8 | STG; 0 | X | NEW +5 | X | **STG** **+6** | NEW −27 |
| South Sydney | NEW −17 | **BAL** **+12** | **STG** **−18** | **NOR** **+3** | **WES** **+10** | CBY +10 | **EAS** **−2** | BAL −14 | **STG** **+9** | NOR −7 | WES +7 | **CBY** **+2** | EAS +34 | **NEW** **−15** | | | | | |
| St. George | NOR +1 | WES +9 | SOU +18 | EAS −20 | NEW +1 | BAL −2 | CBY +8 | **WES** **+3** | SOU −9 | EAS +2 | NEW −13 | BAL −6 | **CBY** **+5** | **NOR**; **0** | X | X | BAL +7 | NOR −6 | |
| Western Suburbs | BAL −4 | **STG** **−9** | NOR +3 | CBY +11 | SOU −10 | EAS −5 | NEW −4 | STG −3 | **NOR** **−18** | **CBY** **−8** | **SOU** **−7** | **EAS** **+16** | **NEW** **−1** | **BAL** **−5** | | | | | |
| Team | 1 | 2 | 3 | 4 | 5 | 6 | 7 | 8 | 9 | 10 | 11 | 12 | 13 | 14 | F1 | F2 | F3 | F4 | GF |

Bold – Home game
X – Bye
Opponent for round listed above margin

=== Ladder ===
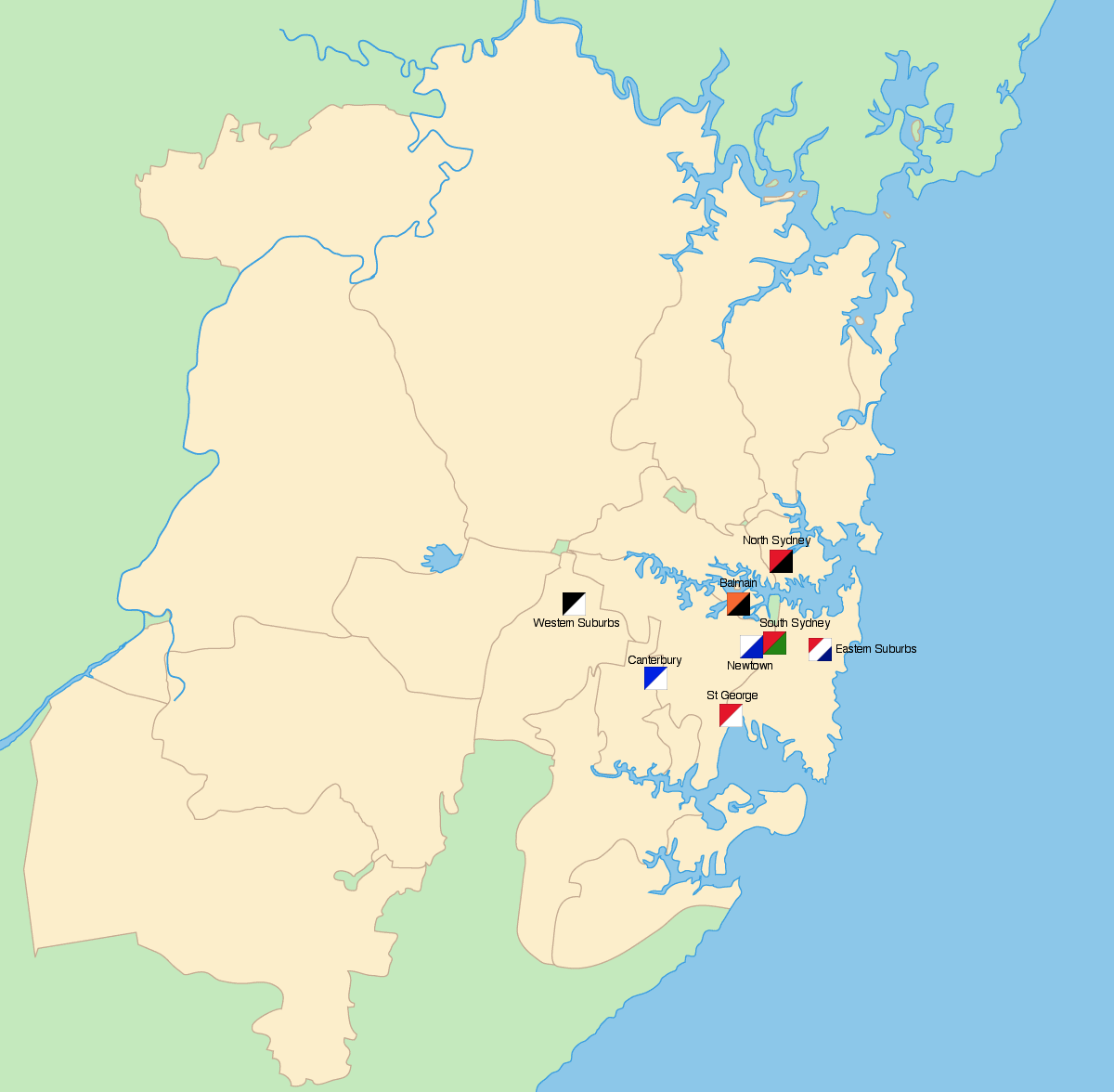
The geographical locations of the teams that contested the 1943 premiership across Sydney.

| | Team | Pld | W | D | L | PF | PA | PD | Pts |
|---|---|---|---|---|---|---|---|---|---|
| 1 | Newtown | 14 | 10 | 1 | 3 | 272 | 143 | +129 | 21 |
| 2 | Balmain | 14 | 10 | 1 | 3 | 178 | 131 | +47 | 21 |
| 3 | North Sydney | 14 | 7 | 3 | 4 | 193 | 124 | +69 | 17 |
| 4 | St. George | 14 | 8 | 1 | 5 | 185 | 188 | −3 | 17 |
| 5 | South Sydney | 14 | 8 | 0 | 6 | 161 | 147 | +14 | 16 |
| 6 | Eastern Suburbs | 14 | 4 | 0 | 10 | 131 | 214 | −83 | 8 |
| 7 | Western Suburbs | 14 | 3 | 0 | 11 | 132 | 176 | −44 | 6 |
| 8 | Canterbury | 14 | 3 | 0 | 11 | 115 | 244 | −129 | 6 |

=== Ladder progression ===
- Numbers highlighted in green indicate that the team finished the round inside the top 4.
- Numbers highlighted in blue indicates the team finished first on the ladder in that round.
- Numbers highlighted in red indicates the team finished last place on the ladder in that round.

| | Team | 1 | 2 | 3 | 4 | 5 | 6 | 7 | 8 | 9 | 10 | 11 | 12 | 13 | 14 |
|---|---|---|---|---|---|---|---|---|---|---|---|---|---|---|---|
| 1 | Newtown | 2 | 4 | 6 | 6 | 6 | 7 | 9 | 11 | 13 | 15 | 17 | 17 | 19 | 21 |
| 2 | Balmain | 2 | 2 | 2 | 4 | 6 | 8 | 9 | 11 | 13 | 13 | 15 | 17 | 19 | 21 |
| 3 | North Sydney | 0 | 2 | 2 | 2 | 4 | 5 | 6 | 8 | 10 | 12 | 14 | 16 | 16 | 17 |
| 4 | St. George | 2 | 4 | 6 | 6 | 8 | 8 | 10 | 12 | 12 | 14 | 14 | 14 | 16 | 17 |
| 5 | South Sydney | 0 | 2 | 2 | 4 | 6 | 8 | 8 | 8 | 10 | 10 | 12 | 14 | 16 | 16 |
| 6 | Eastern Suburbs | 0 | 0 | 2 | 4 | 4 | 6 | 8 | 8 | 8 | 8 | 8 | 8 | 8 | 8 |
| 7 | Western Suburbs | 0 | 0 | 2 | 4 | 4 | 4 | 4 | 4 | 4 | 4 | 4 | 6 | 6 | 6 |
| 8 | Canterbury-Bankstown | 2 | 2 | 2 | 2 | 2 | 2 | 2 | 2 | 2 | 4 | 4 | 4 | 4 | 6 |

== Finals ==
For the second year running, the minor premiership was decided by a playoff and again Balmain failed to win this important match, this time against Newtown. The following week both of these teams lost their matches to lower-ranked teams, and as a result, the victors North Sydney and St. George faced off to decide who would meet the minor premiers in the final. North Sydney won this match which allowed them to face the side they had beaten two weeks earlier again; this time in the final. Here, Newtown won the match and claimed their third and likely last premiership. The team was expelled from first grade after the 1983 season, and hasn’t returned since

| Home | Score | Away | Match Information |
| Home | Score | Away | Date and Time | Venue | Referee | Crowd |
|---|---|---|---|---|---|---|
Playoff
| Newtown | 11–10 | Balmain | 7 August 1943 | Sydney Cricket Ground | | 47,230 |
Semifinals
| Newtown | 16–21 | North Sydney | 14 August 1943 | Sydney Cricket Ground | Jack O'Brien | 35,920 |
| Balmain | 5–12 | St. George | 21 August 1943 | Sydney Cricket Ground | George Bishop | 27,395 |
Preliminary Final
| North Sydney | 25–19 | St. George | 28 August 1943 | Sydney Cricket Ground | Jack O'Brien | 41,646 |
Final
| Newtown | 34–7 | North Sydney | 4 September 1943 | Sydney Cricket Ground | Jack O'Brien | 60,922 |

=== Premiership final ===
| Newtown | Position | North Sydney |
|---|---|---|
| 13. Tom Kirk | FB | 1. Stan Ridgway |
| 24. Sid Goodwin | WG | 2. Frank Collins |
| 10. Len Smith | CE | 3. Frank Hyde (Ca./Co.) |
| 9. Norm Jacobson | CE | 4. Ted Rudd |
| 12. Bruce Ryan | WG | 5. Ron Ainsworth |
| 8. Tom Nevin | FE | 6. Cyril McMahon |
| 7. Paddy Bugden | HB | 7. Johnny McLachlan |
| 3. Gordon MacLennan | PR | 11. Laurie Doran |
| 1. Jimmy Brailey | HK | 12. Frank Facer |
| 2. Frank Farrell (c) | PR | 14. Harry McKinnon |
| 5. Keith Phillips | SR | 15. Max Whitehead |
| 4. Herb Narvo | SR | 9. Don McKinnon |
| 6. Charles Cahill | LK | 10. Gerald Scully |
| Arthur Folwell | Coach | |

The final was played at the SCG before a record crowd of 60,922, though there were thousands more on roofs and vantage points outside the ground. Because of the War all service people got in, if they were in uniform, for free. Norths were missing two stars on active service who had contributed to their season's performance – lock Harry Taylor and full-back Neville Butler who was killed in an Air Force action not long before the final.

Police closed the gates two hours before kick-off leaving ten thousand fans locked out. Latecomers offered up to £10 for seats in the stand. The match provided a great betting orgy with bets of £100 common and more than £25,000 laid before the match began.

Captained by the colourful Frank "Bumper" Farrell, Newtown took on the fancied North Sydney side. The men from across the harbour were led by Frank Hyde and his Norths' side had shown no sympathy for his former club, having beaten Newtown three times already that season. Newtown countered the short-kicking tactics of the Bears into an advantage of their own, gaining a strong lead at half-time and going on to win 34–7. The 27-point margin was a grand final record. Stars of the day for Newtown were forward Charles Cahill along with backs Len Smith and Tom Kirk. It was the third premiership win for Newtown, and would turn out to be their last before being expelled from the top flight after the 1983 season

Newtown 34 (Tries: Goodwin 2, Ryan, Brailey, Phillips, Narvo, Smith, Farrell. Goals: Kirk 5)

defeated

North Sydney 7 (Tries: McLachlan. Goals: Rudd 2)

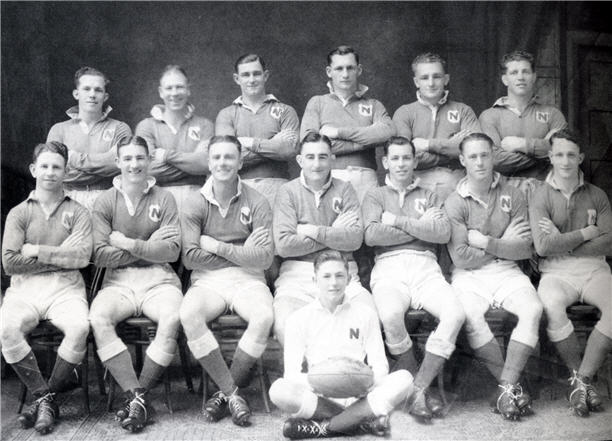
Newtown 1943 premiers

== Player statistics ==
The following statistics are as of the conclusion of Round 14.

Top 5 point scorers

| Points | Player | Tries | Goals | Field Goals |
|---|---|---|---|---|
| 100 | Tom Kirk | 0 | 50 | 0 |
| 80 | Ted Rudd | 4 | 34 | 0 |
| 69 | Fred Felsch | 3 | 30 | 0 |
| 49 | Bob Andrews | 3 | 20 | 0 |
| 41 | Frank Dreise | 5 | 13 | 0 |

Top 5 try scorers

| Tries | Player |
|---|---|
| 10 | Cyril McMahon |
| 9 | Len Kelly |
| 8 | Norm Jacobson |
| 7 | Sid Goodwin |
| 7 | Keith Phillips |

Top 5 goal scorers

| Goals | Player |
|---|---|
| 50 | Tom Kirk |
| 34 | Ted Rudd |
| 30 | Fred Felsch |
| 20 | Bob Andrews |
| 18 | Bert Cowley |
