= 1944 NSWRFL season =

Rugby league competition

1944 New South Wales Rugby Football League
- Teams: 8
- Premiers: Balmain (8th title)
- Minor premiers: Newtown (4th title)
- Matches played: 60
- Points scored: 2159
- Top points scorer: Tom Kirk (185)
- Wooden spoon: Canterbury-Bankstown (2nd spoon)
- Top try-scorer: Sid Goodwin (22)

The 1944 NSWRFL season was the thirty-seventh season of the New South Wales Rugby Football League premiership, Sydney's top-level rugby league competition, and Australia's first. Eight teams from across the city contested the premiership during the season which culminated in Balmain's victory over Newtown in the grand final.

== Teams ==
- Balmain, formed on January 23, 1908, at Balmain Town Hall
- Canterbury-Bankstown
- Eastern Suburbs, formed on January 24, 1908, at Paddington Town Hall
- Newtown, formed on January 14, 1908
- North Sydney, formed on February 7, 1908
- South Sydney, formed on January 17, 1908, at Redfern Town Hall
- St. George, formed on November 8, 1920, at Kogarah School of Arts
- Western Suburbs, formed on February 4, 1908

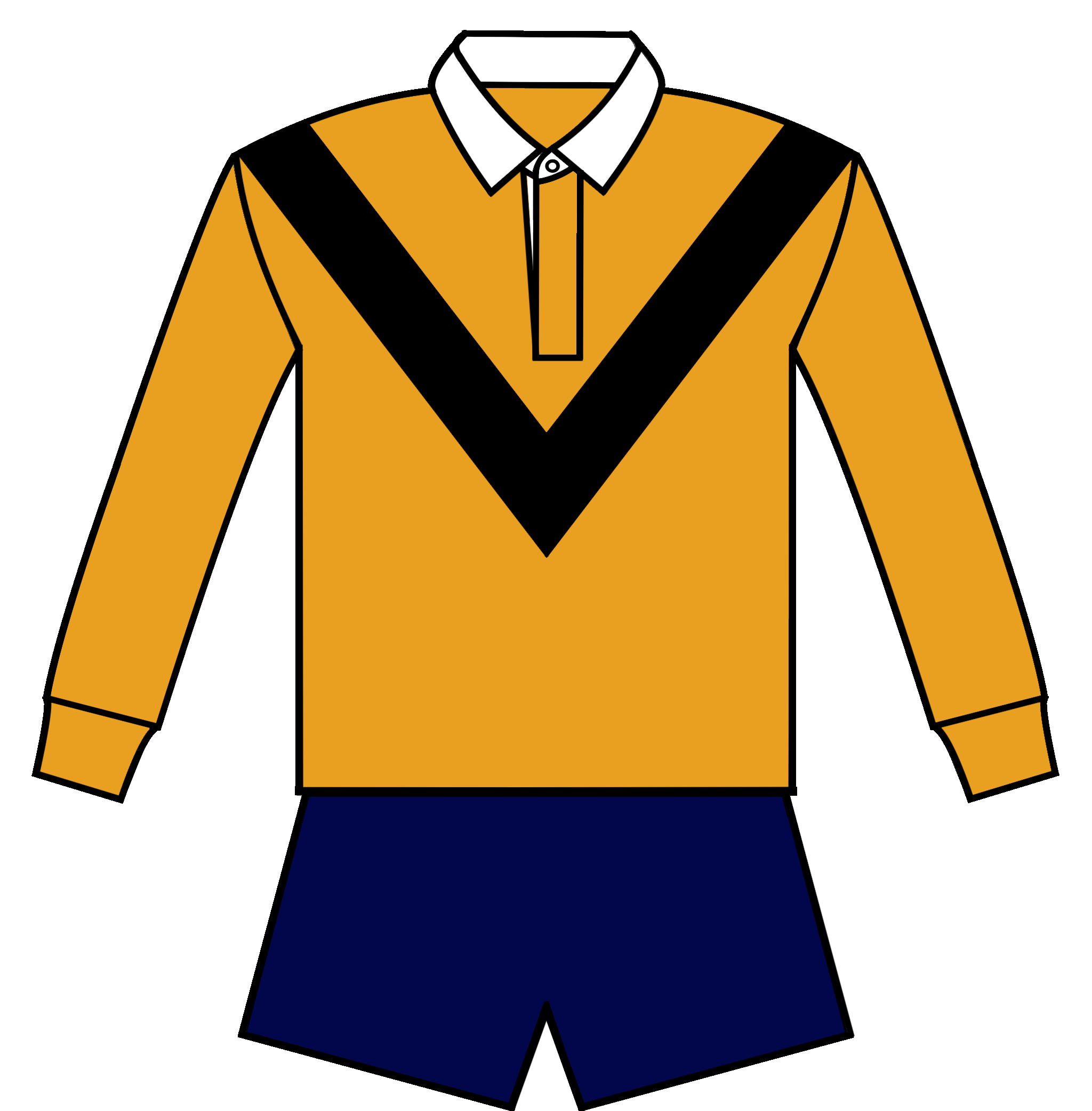
Balmain 37th season Ground: Leichhardt Oval; Coach: Norm Robinson; Captain: Arthur Patton

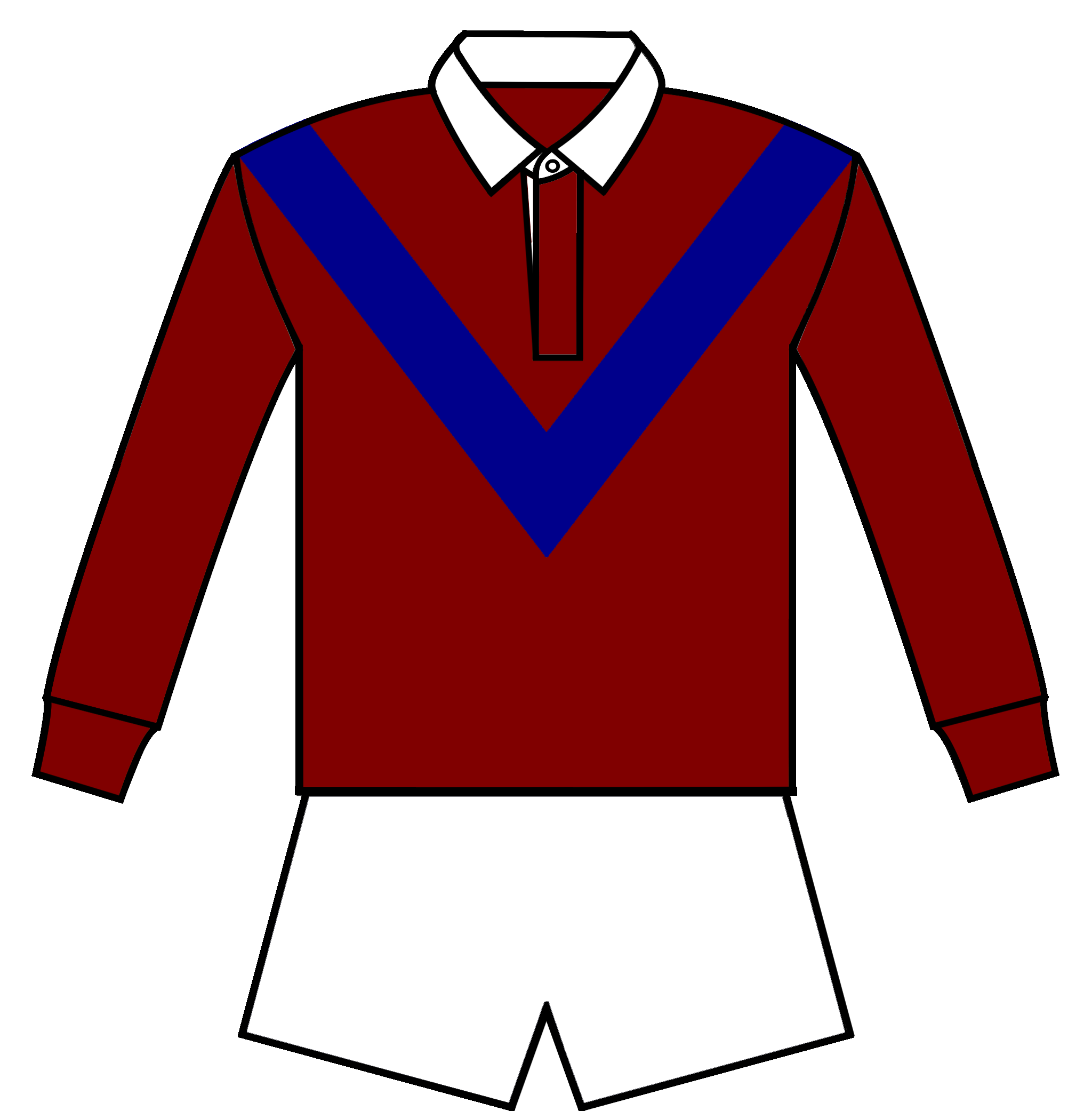
Canterbury-Bankstown 10th season Ground: Belmore Sports Ground; Coach: Ron Bailey→Cec Fifield; Captain: Ron Bailey

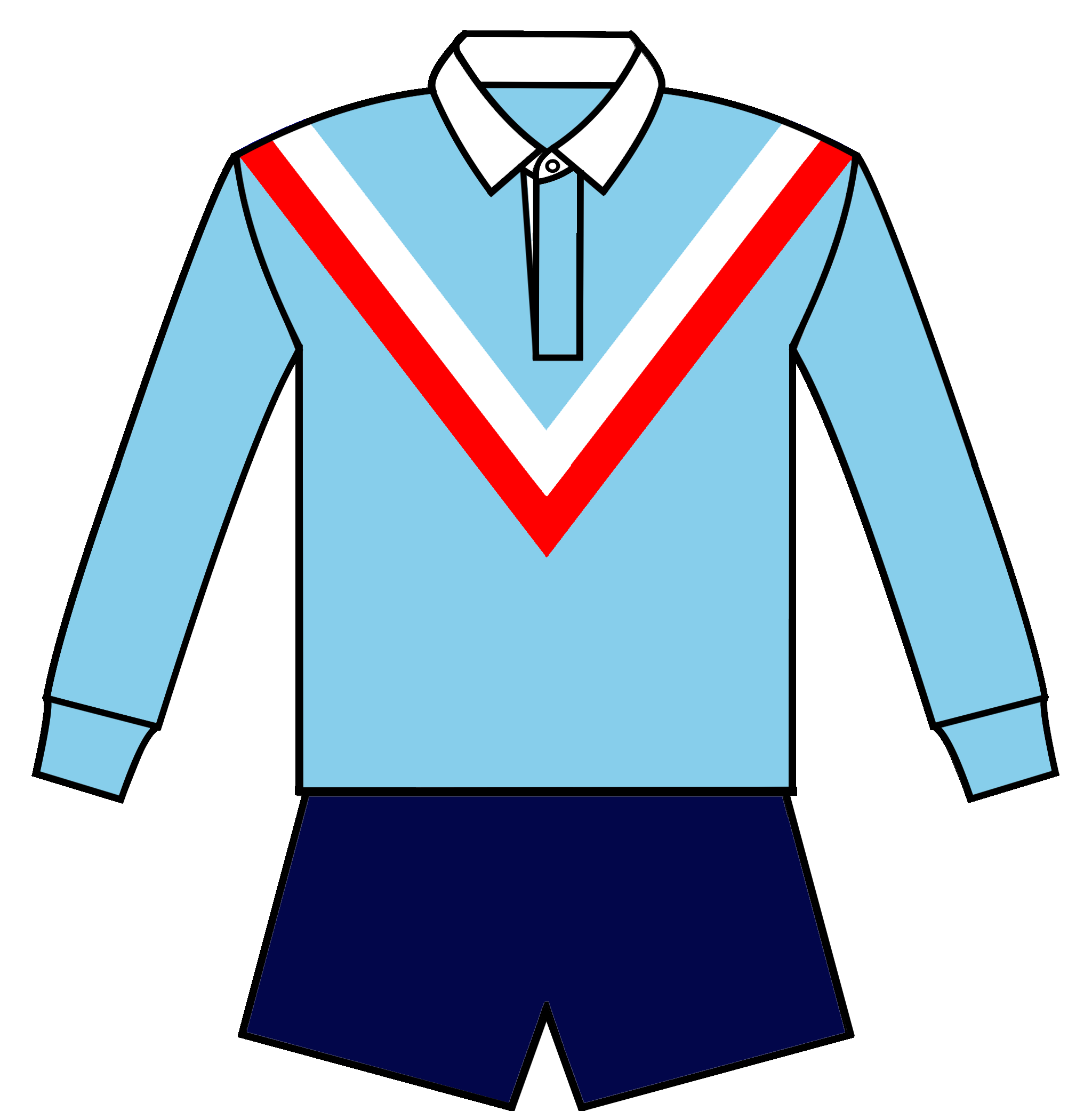
Eastern Suburbs 37th season Ground: Sydney Sports Ground; Coach: Sid Pearce; Captain: Harry Pierce

Newtown 37th season Ground: Henson Park; Coach: Arthur Folwell; Captain: Frank Farrell

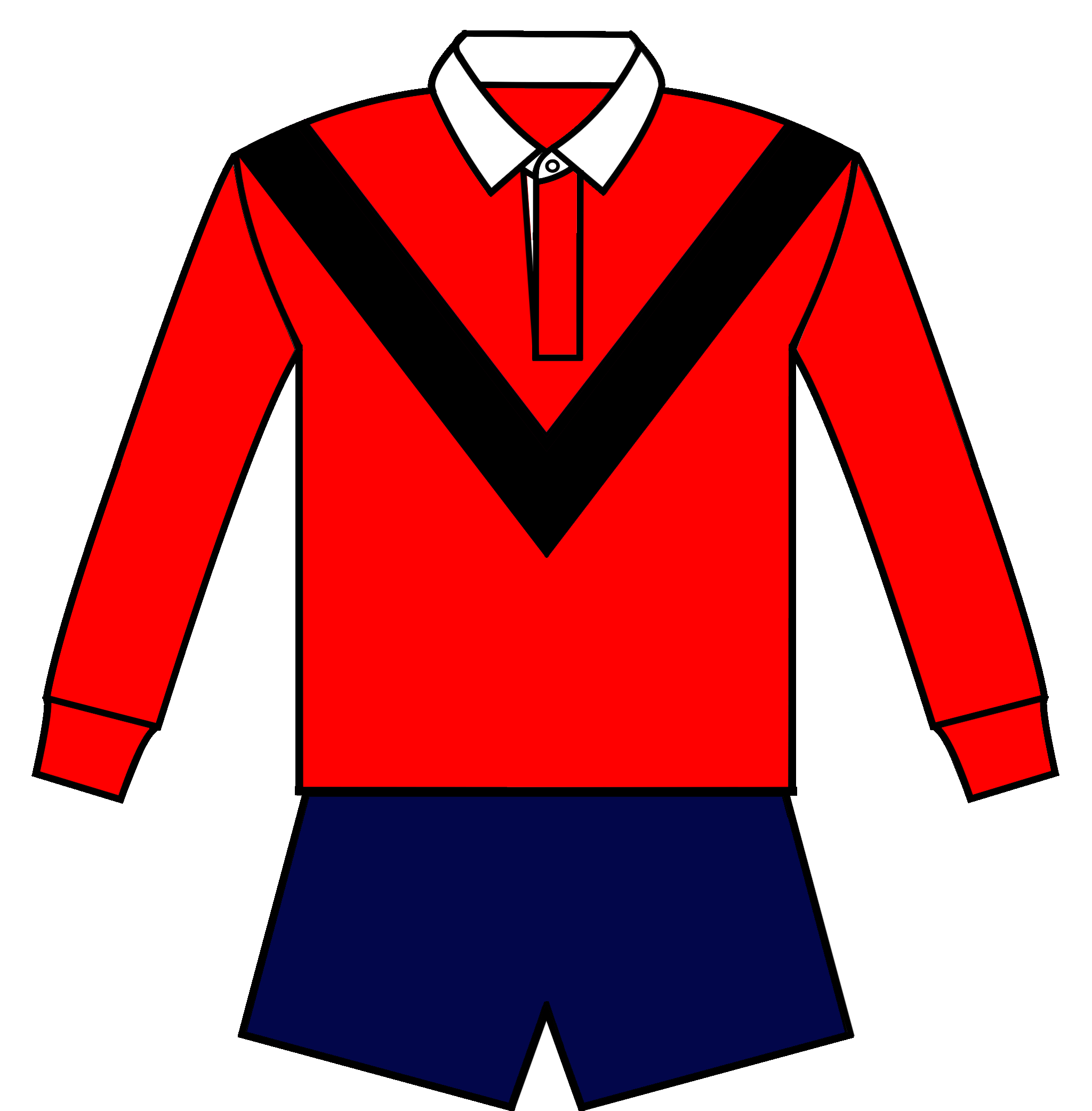
North Sydney 37th season Ground: North Sydney Oval; Captain-Coach: Frank Hyde

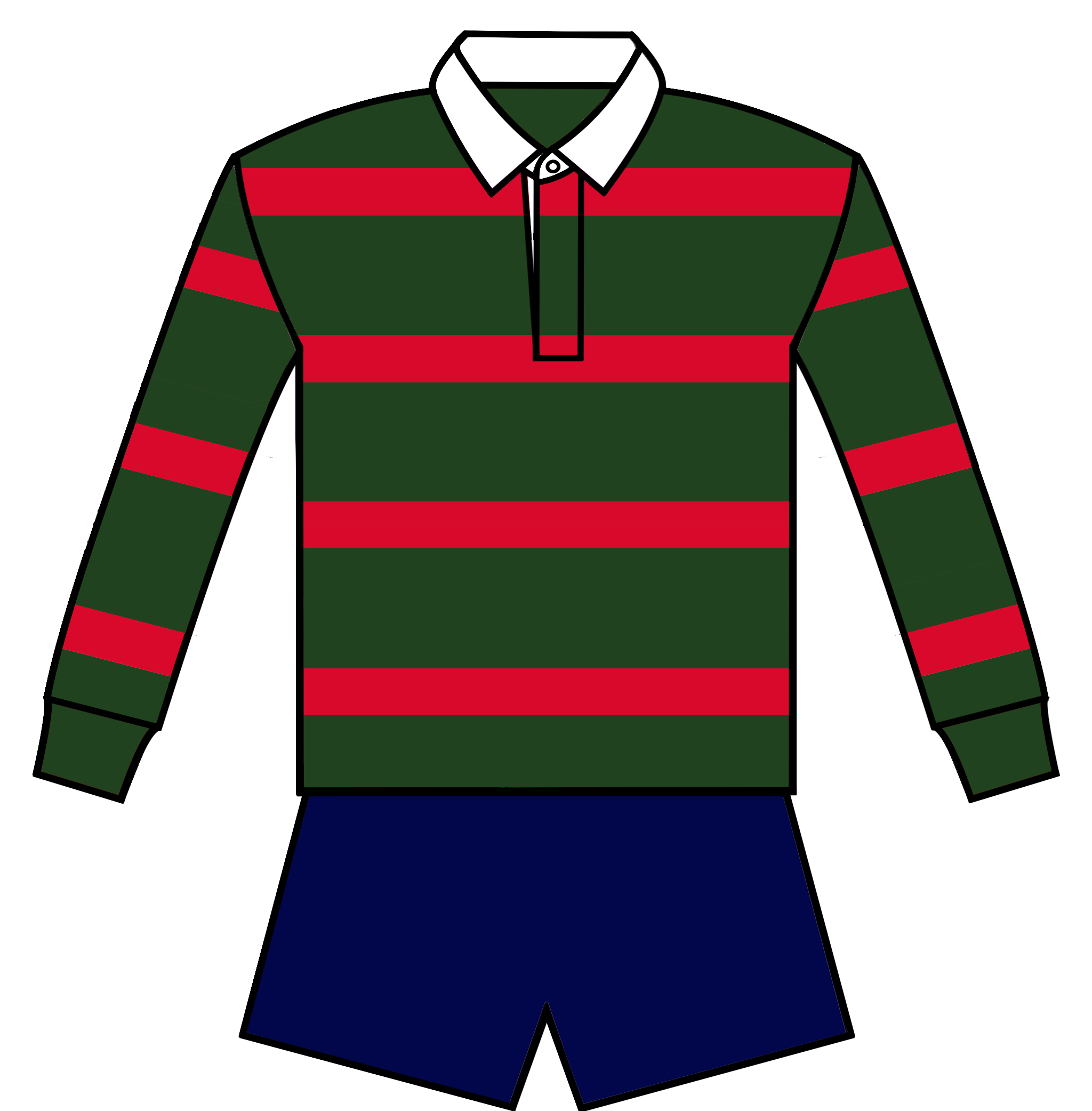
South Sydney 37th season Ground: Sydney Sports Ground; Coach: Alf Blair; Captain: Jack Walsh

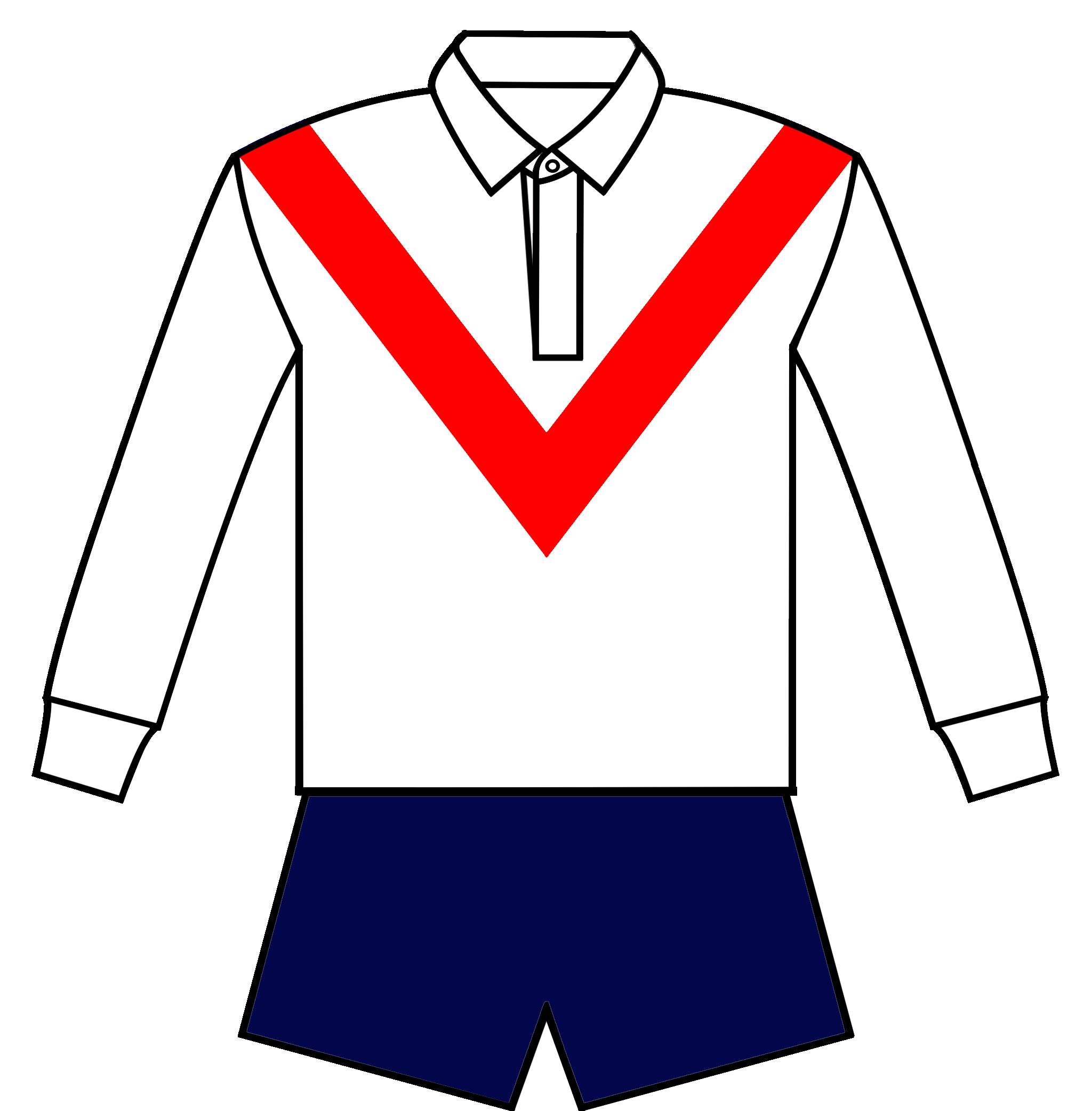
St. George 24th season Ground: Hurstville Oval; Coach: Bill Kelly; Captain: Len Kelly

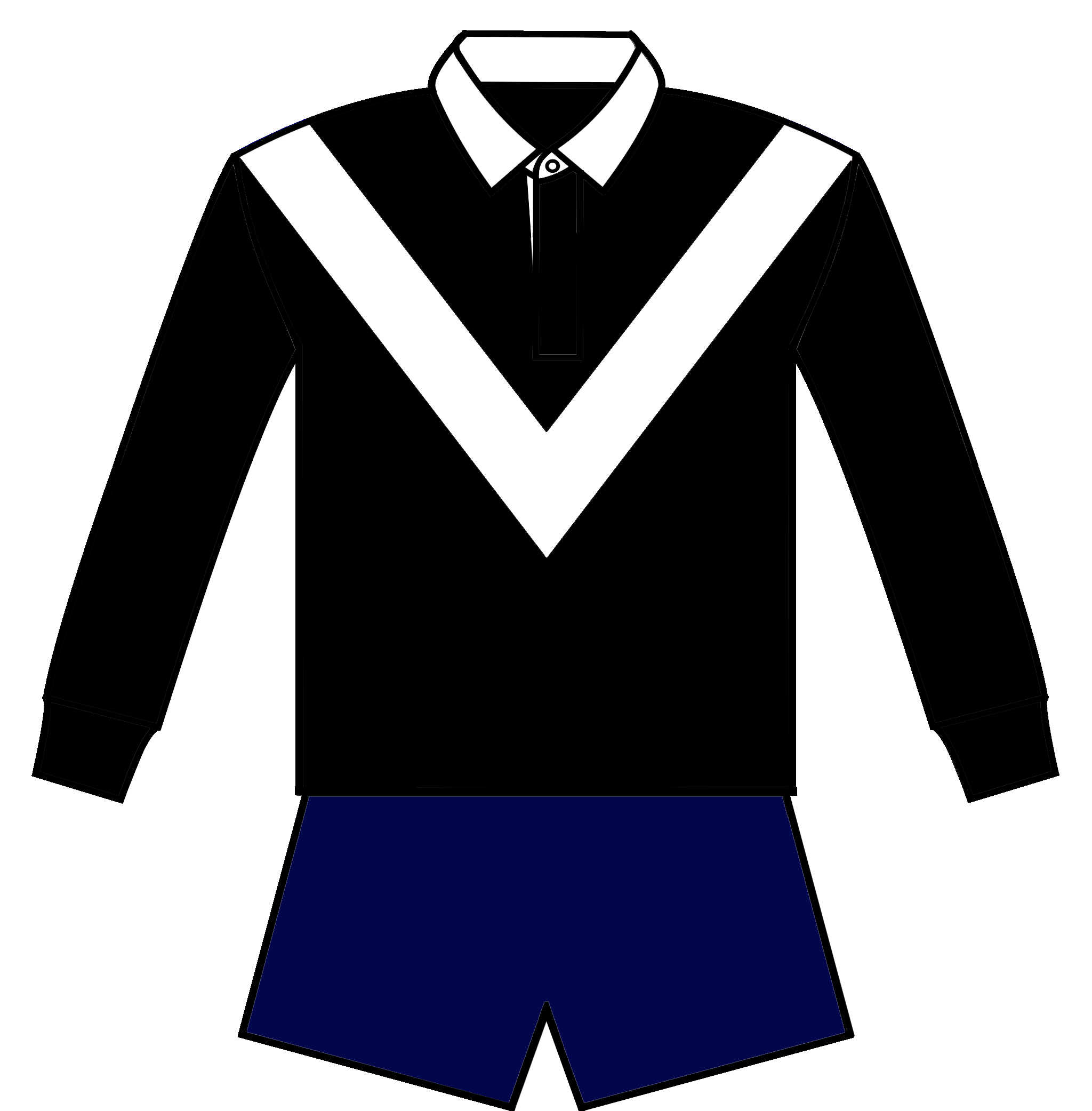
Western Suburbs 37th season Ground: Pratten Park; Coach: Henry Bolewski; Captain: Paddy Bugden

== Ladder ==
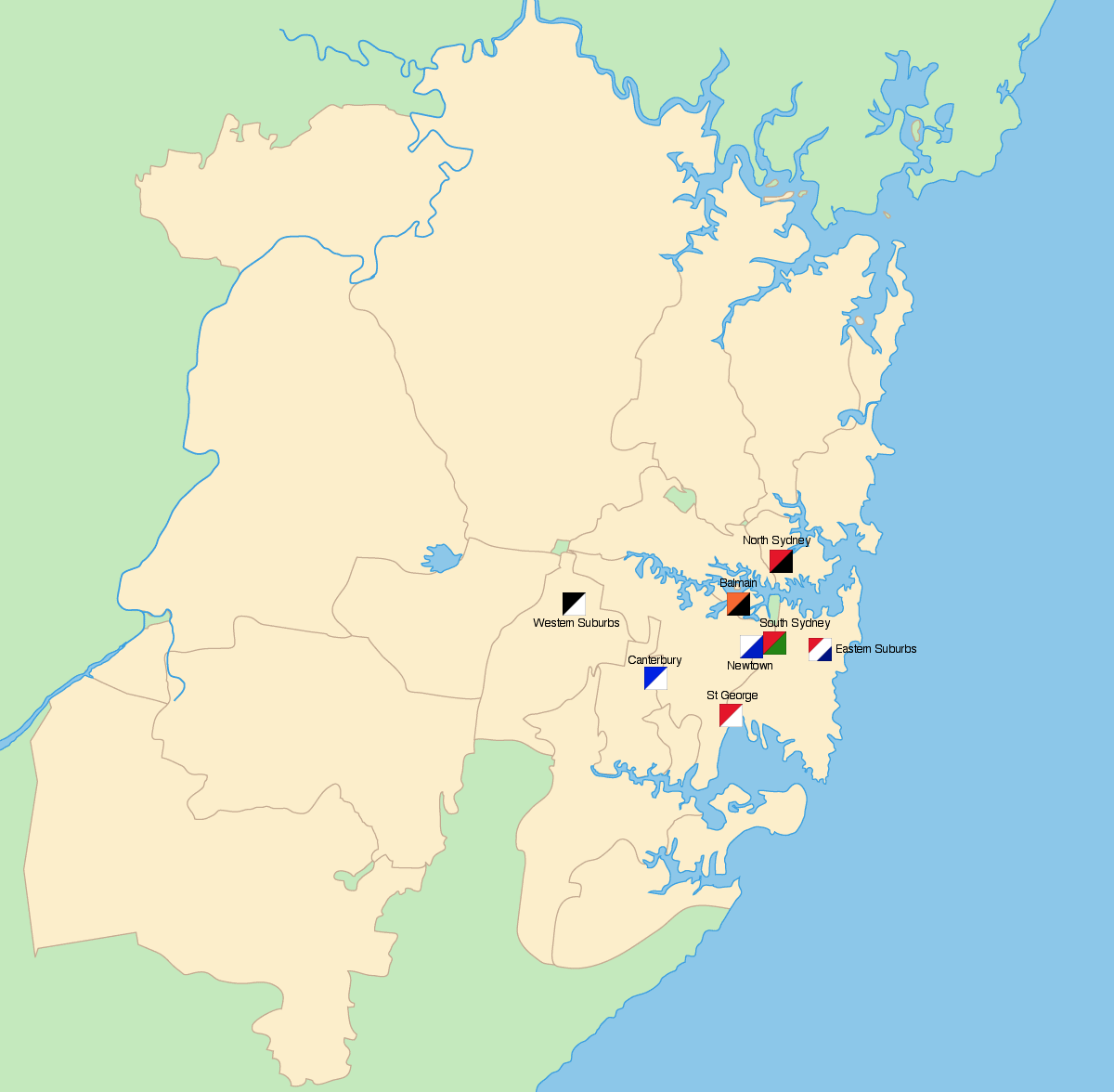
The geographical locations of the teams that contested the 1944 premiership across Sydney.

	Team	Pld	W	D	L	PF	PA	PD	Pts
1	Newtown	14	11	0	3	379	220	+159	22
2	Balmain	14	10	1	3	402	171	+231	21
3	St. George	14	9	0	5	230	238	-8	18
4	South Sydney	14	7	1	6	193	287	-94	15
5	North Sydney	14	5	1	8	204	202	+2	11
6	Western Suburbs	14	4	2	8	180	246	-66	10
7	Eastern Suburbs	14	4	0	10	227	360	-133	8
8	Canterbury	14	3	1	10	206	297	-91	7

== Finals ==
Newtown looked set for back-to-back titles after finishing as minor premiers. Both Newtown and Balmain won their respective semi-finals with the Bluebags blitzing St George by 55 points to 7, which was to remain the Dragons' largest losing margin until 1994 and the largest margin in a finals match until 2019. However injuries and war duties then ravaged the side including the key losses of Len Smith and Herb Narvo who had starred for them all season. Balmain thus overcame Newtown 19–16 in the final, enabling Newtown a “right of challenge”.

Home	Score	Away	Match Information
Home	Score	Away	Date and Time	Venue	Referee	Crowd
Semifinals
Newtown	55–7	St. George	26 August 1944	Sydney Cricket Ground	Tom McMahon	34,883
Balmain	15–6	South Sydney	2 September 1944	Sydney Cricket Ground	Jack O'Brien	28,237
Final
Newtown	16–19	Balmain	9 September 1944	Sydney Cricket Ground	Tom McMahon	41,807
Grand Final
Newtown	8–12	Balmain	16 September 1944	Sydney Cricket Ground	Jack O'Brien	24,186

=== Grand Final ===
Newtown	Position	Balmain
Tom Kirk	FB	Dave Parkinson
Sid Goodwin	WG	Arthur Patton (c)
Lin McLean	CE	Joe Jorgenson
Bruce Ryan	CE	Tom Bourke
Norm Jacobson	WG	Keith Parkinson
Tom Nevin	FE	Stan Ponchard
Jack Kadwell	HB	Pat Devery
Charlie Montgomery	PR	Jack Hampstead
Jimmy Brailey	HK	George Watt
Frank Farrell (c)	PR	Colin Campbell
Keith Phillips	SR	Athol Smith
Leo Ryan	SR	Sid Ryan
Charles Cahill	LK	Dawson Buckley
Arthur Folwell	Coach	Norm "Latchem" Robinson

Newtown exercised their “right of challenge” as minor premiers and called for a Grand Final. In a low-scoring affair Balmain's representative centre Joe Jorgenson kicked two late penalty goals to give the Tigers a 12–8 win and their eighth title.

Balmain 12 (Tries: Devery, K Parkinson. Goals: Jorgenson 3)

defeated

Newtown 8 (Tries: Farrell, McLean. Goals: Kirk)

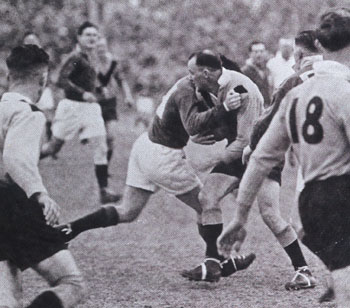
Tom Bourke of Balmain, with the ball, is about to be tackled by the Newtown defence. In the foreground Balmain pair Stan Ponchard (No.7) and Keith Parkinson (No.18) watch on.

== Player statistics ==
The following statistics are as of the conclusion of Round 14.

Top 5 point scorers

Points	Player	Tries	Goals	Field Goals
154	Tom Kirk	2	74	0
89	Joe Jorgenson	3	40	0
85	Leo Doyle	5	35	0
74	Frank Dreise	8	25	0
60	Sid Goodwin	20	0	0

Top 5 try scorers

Tries	Player
20	Sid Goodwin
19	Arthur Patton
12	Bernie Burford
11	Keith Parkinson
10	Tom Bourke
10	Jim Armstrong
10	Alf Watsford

Top 5 goal scorers

Goals	Player
74	Tom Kirk
40	Joe Jorgenson
35	Leo Doyle
25	Frank Dreise
20	Lin Johnson
