= Jimmy Brailey =

Australian rugby league footballer

Personal information
- Full name: James Albert Brailey
- Born: 10 October 1919 Marrickville, New South Wales, Australia
- Died: 14 January 1981 (aged 61) Petersham, New South Wales, Australia

Playing information
- Position: Hooker
Club
Years	Team	Pld	T	G	FG	P
1940–47	Newtown	63	8	0	0	24
- Source: Whiticker/Hudson

James Albert Brailey (1919–1981) was an Australian rugby league footballer who played in the 1940s.

== Background ==
Brailey was born in Marrickville, New South Wales, on 10 October 1919.

== Playing career ==
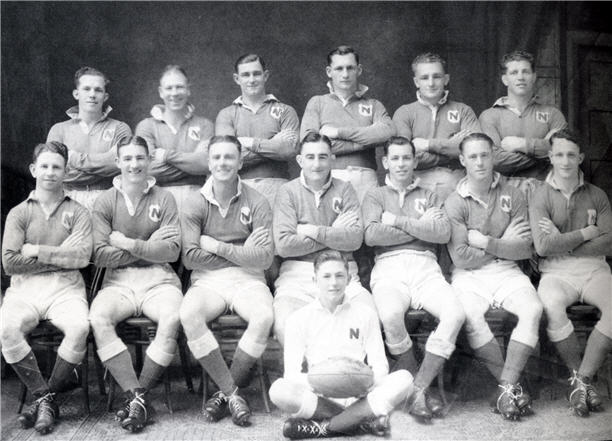
Brailey (1st row 3rd from right) in the Newtown 1943 premiership team

Brailey came through the Newtown junior ranks to become a first-grade player for Newtown as a hooker. He played seven seasons with Newtown between 1940 and 1947.

Brailey won a premiership with the club in 1943 and was a member of the team that were runners up in 1944. He was a part of a formidable forward pack which included legendary players including Frank Farrell, Gordon MacLennan, Chicka Cahill and Herb Narvo.

Brailey died on 14 January 1981, aged 61.
