= Arthur Folwell =

English RL coach and former Australia international rugby league footballer

Personal information
- Full name: Arthur Fitzgerald Folwell
- Born: 23 September 1904 Wigston Magna, Leicestershire, England, United Kingdom
- Died: 14 October 1966 (aged 62) Empire Bay, New South Wales, Australia

Playing information
- Position: Hooker
Club
Years	Team	Pld	T	G	FG	P
1928–40	Newtown	82	2	0	0	6
Representative
Years	Team	Pld	T	G	FG	P
1932–33	NSW City	2	0	0	0	0
1932–34	New South Wales	6	0	0	0	0
1933	Australia	2	0	0	0	0

Coaching information
Club
Years	Team	Gms	W	D	L	W%
1942–45	Newtown	67	40	3	24	60
- As of 11 February 2019

Arthur Fitzgerald Folwell (23 September 1904 – 14 October 1966) was a British-born Australian professional rugby league footballer who played in the 1920s, 1930s and 1940s, coached in the 1940s, and was an administrator in the mid-20th century. An Australia national and New South Wales state representative hooker, he played his club football in the New South Wales Rugby Football League for Sydney's Newtown before becoming their coach and taking them to the 1943 NSWRFL premiership.

== Playing career ==
In 1933 Folwell was selected for the Australian touring squad for the 1933–34 Kangaroo tour of Great Britain . He became Kangaroo No. 179 when played in the 2nd and 3rd Test matches and he played another 19 matches on the 1933-34 tour.

== Coaching career ==
Folwell coached Newtown for three seasons during the Second World War (1942–1944). He is remembered as the winning grand final coach in 1943, the year Newtown won the 1943 grand final. In Folwell's final year as coach of Newtown he took them to the 1944 NSWRFL season's grand final which was lost to Balmain. He assisted Bumper Farrell and Len Smith as coach of the Blue Bags during the final year of World War II before retiring.

== Later life ==
He later became a New South Wales and Australian Rugby League selector during the 1950s and early 1960s. Folwell died at his home at Empire Bay aged 62.

Folwell was the grandfather of the rugby league footballer; Greg Pierce.

Folwell was named at hooker in the Newtown Jets Team of the Century (1908–2007).
