= Guido Rings =

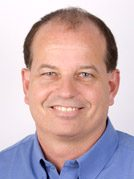
Guido Rings

Guido Rings is Professor of Postcolonial Studies, director of the Research Unit for Intercultural and Transcultural Studies (RUITS), and Course Leader for the MA Intercultural Communication at Anglia Ruskin University in Cambridge, United Kingdom. He was previously Reader in Intercultural Studies and Head of Modern Foreign Languages at the same institution, and he was Visiting Professor for Romance Literature and Film at the University of Düsseldorf and the University of Bayreuth, Germany. Professor Rings is also co-editor of German as a Foreign Language (GFL) and Interdisciplinary Mexico (iMex), the first fully refereed internet journals in Europe for their respective fields. He is member of the Higher Education Academy (HEA).

== Academic career ==
After the completion of first degrees in Spanish, German and History (1st Staatsexamen) and PGCE equivalents in these subject areas (2nd Staatsexamen), Guido Rings received his PhD in Spanish Philology and his postdoctoral degree (Habilitation) from the University of Trier in 1996 and 2005. His professional career started with lectureships for FIAC in Barcelona and the IIK in Düsseldorf, before he went to Cambridge to teach German, Spanish and Intercultural Studies for Anglia Ruskin University. In 2000, he became Head of German and Reader in Intercultural Studies, and he co-founded the academic internet journal GFL. In 2007, he took on a Professorship in Postcolonial Studies, and he launched the research unit RUITS within the framework of the international conference ‘Neo-colonial mentalities in contemporary Europe?’ in London. The conference proceedings were published by Cambridge Scholars Publishing shortly afterwards. In 2010, the German Academic Exchange Service invited Guido Rings to join the University of Düsseldorf where he delivered courses on ‘Identity and Otherness in contemporary Spanish cinema about migration’, ‘The Conquest of America in the new historical narrative of Spain and Latin American’ and ‘1910-2010: The other Mexico – from the Novel of the Mexican Revolution to Zapatist hypertexts’. Back in Cambridge, Guido Rings co-founded the international journal iMex with colleagues from the University of Düsseldorf, and he took on consultancy roles for Cambridge University Press and Routledge. Professor Rings has also been peer reviewer for the Arts & Humanities Research Council (AHRC), the Irish Research Council for Humanities and Social Sciences (IRCHSS) and several academic journals, including the Journal of International and Intercultural Communication, Current Issues in Language Planning and Iberoamericana. He has been external examiner for Birkbeck College, London, and consultant for the Education, Audiovisual and Culture Executive Agency (EACEA) of the European Union.

== Areas of expertise ==
- migrant cinema and migrant literature (see for example his publications from 2009, 2010 and 2012 under “edited volumes” below)
- postcolonial literature, cinema and theatre about the conquest of America (see his monograph La Conquista Desbaratada from 2010)
- cultural theory and intercultural communication theory

== Selected bibliography ==
Professor Rings' research outputs cover different areas of Postcolonial Studies, Intercultural Communication, European Languages and Cultural Studies. He publishes in English, German and Spanish language, and selected key works include:

Authored books

- La Conquista desbaratada. Identidad y alteridad en la novela, el cine y el teatro hispánicos contemporáneos (The Conquest upside down. Identity and Otherness in the contemporary Hispanic novel, cinema and theatre; Madrid: Iberoamericana 2010)
- Eroberte Eroberer (Conquered Conquerors; postdoctoral thesis; Frankfurt/Main: Vervuert/Iberoamericana 2005)
- BBC-German Grammar (with R. Tenberg, 2nd revised edition, London: BBC 2005)
- Erzählen gegen den Strich (Narrating against the Tide; PhD thesis; Frankfurt: Lang 1996).
- BBC-German Grammar (with R. Tenberg, 1st edition, London: BBC 1996)

Edited volumes/special issues in journals

- Identity and Otherness in contemporary Chicano cinema (special issue of iMex I/2 2012, pp. 4–115)
- Cultural Encounters in Contemporary German Cinema (with Christopher Hall, special issue of GFL XI/3 2010, pp. 1–150)
- La otra cara de la migración: Imágenes del inmigrante latinoamericano en el cine español contemporáneo (The other side of migration: Images of Latin American migrants in contemporary Spanish cinema, special issue of Iberoamericana IX/34 2009, pp. 71–148)
- Neo-colonial mentalities in contemporary Europe. Language and discourse in the construction of identities (with Anne Ife; Newcastle: Cambridge Scholars Publishing 2008)
- Bilderwelten – Textwelten – Comicwelten (Worlds of images – worlds of texts – worlds of comics; with Frank Leinen; Munich: Meidenbauer 2007)
- European Cinema: Inside Out. Images of the Self and the Other in Postcolonial European Film (with Rikki Morgan-Tamosunas; Heidelberg: Winter 2003)

Refereed articles (selection, since 2000)

- ‘Möglichkeiten und Grenzen der Transkulturalität in Gregory Navas “My family”’ (‘Possibilities and limits of transculturality in Gregory Nava’s “My family”’), in: Frank Leinen (ed./2012): México 2010. Düsseldorf: DUP, pp. 269-288.
- ‘Robinson Crusoe today: Continuities and discontinuities from Daniel Defoe's literary work to Robert Zemeckis's “Cast Away”’, in: Anglistik 22/2 (2011), pp.119-136.
- ‘Questions of identity: Cultural encounters in Gurinder Chadha’s “Bend it like Beckham”’, in: Journal of Popular Film and Television 39/3 (2011), pp. 114-123.
- ‘Madrid: Neo-colonial spacing in contemporary Spanish cinema?’, in: Godela Weiss-Sussex, Katia Pizzi (eds./2010): Cultural Identities of European Cities, London: Lang, pp. 205–229.
- ‘Unendliche Eroberung, unendlicher Widerstand? Das weibliche Körpergedächtnis in Gioconda Bellis “La mujer habitada”’(‘Never ending conquest, never ending resistance? Female body memory in Gioconda Belli’s “The inhabited woman”’), in: GRM 59/4 (2009), pp. 517-532.
- ‘Blurring or shifting boundaries? Concepts of culture in Turkish-German Migrant Cinema’, in: GFL IX/1 (2008), pp. 6–39.
- ‘Gebrochene Romantik – Töpffers “Les amours de M. Vieux-Bois” als Karikatur zeitgenössischer Tendenzen’ (‘Broken Romanticism – Töpffer’s “Les amours de M. Vieux-Bois” as caricature of contemporary tendencies’), in: Frank Leinen, Guido Rings (ed./2007): Bilderwelten – Textwelten – Comicwelten. Munich: Meidenbauer, pp. 207–228.
- ‘Imágenes de la Revolución. Perspectivas ateneístas en “El Águila y la Serpiente” y “Al filo del agua”’ (‘Images of the Revolution. Ateneo perspectives in “El Águila y la Serpiente” and “Al Filo del Agua”’), in: Rafael Olea Franco (ed./2006): Agustín Yáñez: una vida literaria. México: El Colegio de México, pp. 197-226.
- ‘En busca de nuevas formas barrocas: el cine español y latinoamericano contemporáneo’ (‘Searching for new baroque forms: the contemporary Spanish and Latin American Cinema revisited’), in: Iberoamericana VI/21 (2006), pp. 191–209.
- ‘Broken Orientalism. Using literary texts for intercultural training’, in: FLUL 35 (2006), pp. 136–149.
- ‘Emotion und Kognition in Tom Tykwers „Lola Rennt” und Jean-Pierre Jeunets „Le Fabuleux Destin D’Amélie Poulain”’ (‘Emotion and cognition in Tom Tykwer’s “Run Lola Run” and Jean-Pierre Jeunet's “Amelie”’), in: Fabula 46, 3/4 (2005), pp. 197-216.
- ‘Unschuldig schuldig? Zur Schuldfrage und Vermittlung von Schlinks „Der Vorleser” im DaF-Unterricht’ (‘Not Guilty But Guilty? Questions of Guilt in Schlink’s “The reader” for German as a Foreign Language teaching and learning’; with S. Kleymann), in: GFL IV/2 (2004), pp. 80–110.
- ‘Images of the Self and the Other in Postcolonial European Film’ (with Rikki Morgan-Tamosunas), in: Rings/Morgan-Tamosunas (eds./2003): European Cinema: Inside Out. Heidelberg: Winter, pp. 11–26.
- ‘Antagonistic Perspectives. Turkish and European Official Discourse on Kurds’ (with Welat Zeydanlioglu), in: Storia della Storiografia 43 (2003), pp. 98–124.
- ‘Una retroperspectiva ficcional desapercibida acerca de 500 años de conquista. Entrevista de Guido Rings con el escritor argentino Lidio Mosca-Bustamante’ (‘An Unnoticed Fictional Retrospective on 500 Years of Conquest. Interview by Guido Rings with Argentinian writer Lidio Mosca-Bustamante’), in: Revista Literaria Baquiana 19/20 (2002), pp. 1–7.
- ‘Zum emanzipatorischen Potential zweier Fremder: Meursault, Duarte und die Destabilisierung herrschender Diskurse’ (‘The Emancipatory Potential of Two Outsiders: Meursault, Duarte and the Destabilisation of Dominant Discourses’), in: Frank Leinen (ed./2002): Literarische Begegnungen. Romanische Studien zur kulturellen Identität, Differenz und Alterität. Berlin: Erich Schmidt, pp. 130–152.
- ‘Der konditionierte Fremde. Anmerkungen zu Selbst- und Fremdbetrachtungen in Camus’ „L’Étranger”’ (‘The Conditioned Other. Comments on Self and Other in Camus' "The Stranger"’), in: Germanisch-Romanische Monatsschrift 4 (2000), pp. 479–500.
