= Ted Rudd =

Ted Rudd may refer to:

- Ted Rudd (rugby league) (1921–1991), Australian rugby league player
- Ted Rudd (rugby union) (born 1944), English international rugby union player
