= 1944 South Sydney season =

New South Wales Rugby League season

- NSWRFL Rank: 4th
- Play-off result: Lost Semifinal
- 1944 record: Wins: 7; draws: 1; losses: 6
- Points scored: For: 193; against: 287

Team information
- Coach: Alfred Blair
- Captain: Jack Walsh
- Stadium: Sydney Sports Ground

Top scorers
- Tries: James Armstrong (10)
- Goals: Frank Bonner (20)
- Points: Frank Bonner (40)
← 1943	List of seasons	1945 →

The 1944 South Sydney was the 37th in the club's history. The club competed in the New South Wales Rugby Football League Premiership (NSWRFL), finishing the season 4th, losing the semifinals 15-6 to Balmain.

== Ladder ==
	Team	Pld	W	D	L	PF	PA	PD	Pts
1	Newtown	14	11	0	3	379	220	+159	22
2	Balmain	14	10	1	3	402	171	+231	21
3	St. George	14	9	0	5	230	238	-8	18
4	South Sydney	14	7	1	6	193	287	-94	15
5	North Sydney	14	5	1	8	204	202	+2	11
6	Western Suburbs	14	4	2	8	180	246	-66	10
7	Eastern Suburbs	14	4	0	10	227	360	-133	8
8	Canterbury-Bankstown	14	3	1	10	206	297	-91	7

== Fixtures ==
Round	Opponent	Result	Score	Date	Venue	Crowd	Ref
1	St. George	Win	13 – 8	Saturday 29 April	Sports Ground	6,900	
2	Canterbury-Bankstown	Win	12 – 10	Saturday 6 May	Sports Ground		
3	Newtown	Loss	5 – 26	Saturday 13 May	Sydney Cricket Ground	27,000	
4	Western Suburbs	Win	17 – 12	Saturday 20 May	Pratten Park	4,200	
5	Balmain	Loss	13 – 37	Saturday 27 May	Sydney Cricket Ground	23,300	
6	North Sydney	Win	10 – 8	Saturday 3 June	North Sydney Oval	8,000	
7	Eastern Suburbs	Win	26 – 23	Saturday 10 June	North Sydney Oval	2,250	
8	St. George	Win	34 – 20	Saturday 1 July	Hurstville Oval	5,600	
9	Newtown	Loss	5 – 47	Saturday 8 July	Sydney Cricket Ground	23,900	
10	Western Suburbs	Draw	8 – 8	Saturday 15 July	Sports Ground	5,500	
11	Balmain	Loss	12 – 37	Saturday 22 July	Leichardt	6,000	
12	North Sydney	Win	14 – 10	Saturday 29 July	Sports Ground	9,200	
13	Eastern Suburbs	Loss	8 – 22	Saturday 5 August	Sports Ground	2,450	
14	Canterbury-Bankstown	Loss	6 – 15	Saturday 12 August	Belmore	2,500	

=== Finals ===
Home	Score	Away	Match Information
Home	Score	Away	Date and Time	Venue	Referee	Crowd
Semifinals
Balmain	15–6	South Sydney	2 September 1944	Sydney Cricket Ground	Jack O'Brien	28,200
