= Gordon McLennan =

Gordon McLennan or MacLennan may refer to:

- Gordon McLennan (politician) (1924–2011), Scottish leader of the Communist Part of Great Britain
- Gordon McLennan (rugby league) (1915–1966), Australian rugby league footballer
