= Rikki Morgan-Tamosunas =

Retired English academic

Rikki Morgan-Tamosunas is a retired academic specialising in Spanish cinema and Hispanic studies. She was Deputy Vice-Chancellor of the University of Westminster (2009–15) and Dean of its Social Sciences, Humanities and Languages School (2003–06).

== Career ==
Morgan-Tamosunas graduated from Portsmouth Polytechnic with a Bachelor of Arts degree (BA) in Spanish studies; she then completed a Master of Arts degree (MA) in Romance languages and literature at the University of London, and a Postgraduate Certificate in Education (PGCE) from the University of York, before teaching in secondary education for three years. She then returned to university as a doctoral student, earning her PhD from Anglia Polytechnic University with a thesis on contemporary Spanish cinema. She lectured at Thames Valley University (1983–98), eventually becoming Programmes Manager for the School of Creative, Social and Cultural Studies amongst other responsibilities. In 1998, she moved over to Anglia Ruskin University as Dean of the School of Languages and Social Sciences, before being appointed Dean of the School of Social Sciences, Humanities and Languages at the University of Westminster (2003–06); she was subsequently provost of the Cavendish campus and Pro Vice-Chancellor. Between 2009 and 2015, she was Deputy Vice-Chancellor and after retiring, she was appointed an emeritus professor.

== Research ==
Morgan-Tamosunas's main research interests are Spanish cinema and cultural studies. Her published works include:

=== Books ===
- (with B. Jordan) Contemporary Spanish Cinema (Manchester: Manchester University Press, 1998).
- (with B. Jordan) Contemporary Spanish Cultural Studies (Arnold, 2000).
- (with R. Guido) European Cinema: Inside Out Images of the Self and the Other in Postcolonial European cinema (Heidelberg: Universitatsverlag Winter, 2003).

=== Articles and chapters ===
- "Narrative, desire and critical discourse in Pedro Almodovar's Carne tremula", Journal of Iberian and Latin American Studies, 8:2 (2002), pp. 185–199.
- "Deconstructing Paco Rabal: masculinity, myth and meaning", in Powrie, P. (ed.), The Trouble with Men: Masculinities in European and Hollywood Cinema (London: Wallflower Press, 2004), pp. 54–65.

Preceded by Professor Keith Phillips	Dean of the Faculty of Social Sciences, Humanities and Languages, University of Westminster; 2003–2006	Succeeded by ?
