= Fred Lind =

Australian rugby league footballer

Personal information
- Full name: Frederick Charles Lind
- Born: 16 June 1904 Marrickville, New South Wales, Australia
- Died: 28 February 1976 (aged 71) Bateau Bay, New South Wales, Australia

Playing information
- Position: Fullback
Club
Years	Team	Pld	T	G	FG	P
1926–30	Newtown	45	3	22	0	53
- Relatives: Keith Phillips (brother-in-law)

Frederick Charles Lind (1904–1976) was an Australian rugby league footballer who played in the 1920s.

Lind was born at Marrickville, New South Wales in 1904, and came through the Newtown juniors. He was graded in 1926 and played four seasons with the club between 1926 and 1930.

Lind died on 28 February 1976, aged 71 at Bateau Bay, New South Wales.
