= Stan Ridgway (rugby league) =

Australian rugby league footballer (1915–1985)

Personal information
- Full name: Stanley Latham Ridgway
- Born: 8 August 1915 Sydney, New South Wales, Australia
- Died: 15 September 1985 (aged 70) Blakehurst, New South Wales, Australia

Playing information
- Position: Fullback
Club
Years	Team	Pld	T	G	FG	P
1932–44	North Sydney	85	2	33	0	72
- Source: As of 25 June 2019

Stan Ridgway (1915–1985) was an Australian rugby league footballer who played in the 1930s and 1940s. He played in the NSWRFL premiership for North Sydney as a fullback.

== Playing career ==
Ridgway began his first grade career in 1932. Ridgway played at fullback in North's 1943 grand final defeat against Newtown which would prove to be the club's last grand final appearance before exiting the competition in 1999. Ridgway retired at the end of the 1944 season. He finished his career at Cessnock, New South Wales for the 1945 season.
