= Tom Kirk (rugby league) =

Australian rugby league footballer

Tommy Kirk
Personal information
- Full name: Albert Samuel Kirk
- Born: 15 November 1916 Tumut, New South Wales, Australia
- Died: 15 March 1994 (aged 77) Caringbah, New South Wales, Australia

Playing information
- Position: Fullback
Club
Years	Team	Pld	T	G	FG	P
1935	Tumut (Maher Cup)	13	8	37	0	98
1936–39	Canterbury-Bankstown	42	8	105	0	234
1940–46	Newtown	98	14	319	0	680
1947	North Sydney	15	0	58	0	116
1948-51, 53	Barmedman (Maher Cup)	10	1	11	0	25
	Total	178	31	530	0	1153
Representative
Years	Team	Pld	T	G	FG	P
1939–46	New South Wales	4	3	4	0	17
1944–46	NSW City	2	0	4	0	8

Tom Kirk (1916–1994) was an Australian professional rugby league footballer who played in the 1930s and 1940s. A New South Wales state representative goal-kicking fullback, he played in Sydney's NSWRFL for the Canterbury-Bankstown and Newtown clubs (with whom he won premierships) as well as with North Sydney. He was the first player to become the season's top point scorer on 5 occasions: 1938, 1940, 1943, 1944, 1946. In 1947 he became the first player to score 1,000 career points in the NSWRFL.

== Playing career ==
Former fullback of Tumut's Maher Cup team, Kirk moved to Sydney and first tasted premiership success with Canterbury's 1938 Grand Final-winning team, landing four goals in the 19–6 win over Easts in the final. That year he also topped the competition's point-scorers list and the following year made his debut for NSW in the centres.

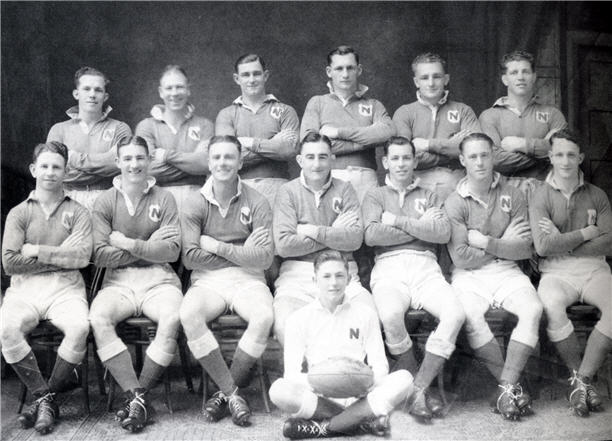
Kirk,(back row 2nd from left) in the Newtown 1943 premiership team

Joining Newtown, Kirk became the first player to kick 100 goals in a season in 1943, including five in the 34–7 win over Norths in the premiership decider. He was the season's leading point scorer on five occasions, the last in 1946.

He twice kicked a club record 11 goals during the 1944 NSWRFL season and set Newtown's club record for most points in a match with 25 (1 try and 11 goals) against St George, on 26 August 1944.

In 1946 he overtook Arthur Oxford's 19-year-old record for the most points scored in an NSWRFL career (864); Kirks's eventual total of 1,042 stood as the new career record for thirteen seasons until it was bettered by Bernie Purcell in 1959.

In 1947, Kirk joined North Sydney for his last season in Sydney, and made a return to the New South Wales side in his final year in the Sydney competition.

He finished his playing career at Barmedman, New South Wales in 1953.

Kirk died in March 1994 aged 77.

Preceded by Arthur Oxford (1927)	Record-holder; Most points in an NSWRFL career 1946 (865) – 1959 (1,042)	Succeeded by Bernie Purcell (1959)
