= Frank Bonner (rugby league) =

Australian rugby league footballer

Personal information
- Full name: Francis George Bonner
- Born: 12 October 1924
- Died: 5 January 2013 (aged 88)

Playing information
- Position: Fullback
Club
Years	Team	Pld	T	G	FG	P
1944–47	South Sydney	24	0	62	0	124

Francis George Bonner (12 October 1924 - 5 January 2013) was an Australian rugby league footballer who played for South Sydney in the 1940s.

Bonner, a fullback, made his first-grade debut in the 1944 NSWRFL season, having started the year with the thirds. He impressed as a goalkicker in just his second first-grade appearance, with seven goals from nine attempts in a win over Eastern Suburbs. Following 24 premiership games, he left South Sydney for the Corrimal Cougars in 1948.
