= Ray Ainsworth =

Australian rugby league footballer

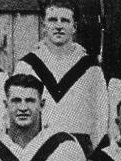

Personal information
- Full name: Raymond Robert Ainsworth
- Born: 5 May 1924 Bexley, New South Wales, Australia
- Died: 26 November 2000 (aged 76) Lorn, New South Wales, Australia

Playing information
- Position: Centre
Club
Years	Team	Pld	T	G	FG	P
1946	St. George	4	1	0	0	3
- Source: As of February 2011

Raymond Robert Ainsworth (5 May 1924 – 26 November 2000) was an Australian rugby league footballer who played for the St. George club in the New South Wales Rugby Football League (NSWRFL).

== Biography ==
Ainsworth came to St George from the Waratah-Mayfield club in Newcastle. He played four first-grade games for Saints during the 1946 NSWRFL season. Ainsworth scored one try in first grade, on 17 August 1946 at North Sydney Oval where St. George defeated North Sydney 32–15. St. George went on win the minor premiership and appear in the 1946 Premiership Final but Ainsworth was replaced by Doug McRitchie in the final. Ainsworth broke his leg in two places in May 1947 and was ruled out for the season.

Ray is the brother of North Sydney's 1943 grand final winger Ron.
