= Bob Andrews (rugby league) =

Australian rugby league footballer (1919-1979)

Robert Charles Andrews
Personal information
- Born: 6 December 1919 Parramatta, New South Wales, Australia
- Died: 2 August 1979 (aged 59)

Playing information

Rugby union
Club
Years	Team	Pld	T	G	FG	P
19??–43	Parramatta RFC

Rugby league
- Position: Centre
Club
Years	Team	Pld	T	G	FG	P
1943–46	Western Suburbs	42	13	52	0	143
1947–48	Parramatta	20	4	32	0	76
	Total	62	17	84	0	219

Robert Charles Andrews was an Australian rugby league footballer who played in the 1940s. He played for Western Suburbs and Parramatta as a centre. He was the inaugural captain of Parramatta and a foundation player of the club.

== Playing career ==
Andrews played Rugby Union for Parramatta before switching codes and made his debut for Western Suburbs in 1943. Andrews finished as top point scorer for the club in 1943, 1944 and 1945 but left at the end of 1946 to join newly admitted side Parramatta. In 1947, Andrews was made captain of the first ever Parramatta team as they played against Newtown on April 12, 1947 at Cumberland Oval. The game finished in a 34–12 defeat with 6000 people in attendance. Parramatta went on to struggle all season and finished last on the table claiming its first wooden spoon. Andrews finished as top point scorer for the club that year. Andrews went on to captain Parramatta again in 1948 and retired at the end of the season.
