= Tom Nevin =

Australian rugby league footballer

Tommy Nevin
Personal information
- Full name: Thomas Joseph Nevin
- Born: 3 September 1916 Annandale, New South Wales, Australia
- Died: 6 May 1972 (aged 55) Penshurst, New South Wales, Australia

Playing information
- Position: Five-eighth
Club
Years	Team	Pld	T	G	FG	P
1935–45	Newtown	142	30	0	0	90

Thomas Nevin (1916–1972) was an Australian rugby league footballer who played in the 1930s and 1940s.

== Playing career ==
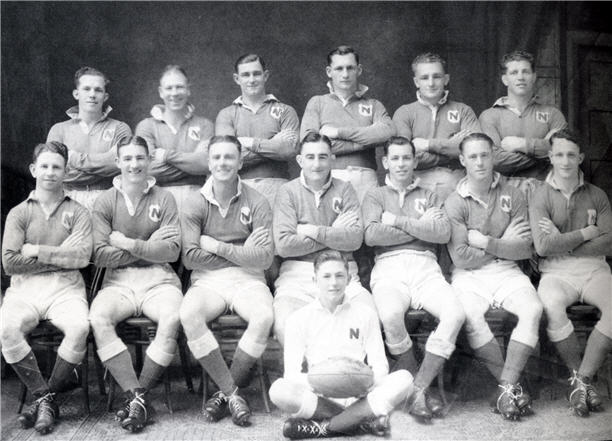
Nevin (1st row 2nd from right) in the Newtown 1943 premiership team

Nevin was a Newtown five-eighth who played eleven seasons of first grade football with the club between 1935 and 1945. He won a premiership with Newtown, playing in the winning 1943 Grand Final. Remembered as a brilliant defender, Nevin played 135 first grade games with Newtown, the highlights being in the teams that won the 1937 City Cup, the 1941 State Cup, the 1943 premiership and the 1945 State Cup before retiring.

Nevin died suddenly from a heart attack on 6 May 1972, aged 56.
