= Neville Butler (rugby league) =

Australian rugby league footballer

Personal information
- Full name: Neville Edward Butler
- Born: 6 August 1917 Tenterfield, New South Wales, Australia
- Died: 29 November 1944 (aged 27) Berlin, Nazi Germany

Playing information
- Position: Fullback
Club
| Years | Team | Pld | T | G | FG | P |
|---|---|---|---|---|---|---|
| 1940–43 | North Sydney | 13 | 0 | 10 | 0 | 20 |
Representative
| Years | Team | Pld | T | G | FG | P |
| 1938 | New South Wales | 1 | 0 | 1 | 0 | 2 |
- Source: As of 1 March 2019
- Military career
- Allegiance: Australia
- Branch: Royal Australian Air Force
- Service years: 1940-1944
- Rank: Flying officer
- Unit: RAAF 460 Squadron
- Conflicts: World War II †

Neville Edward Butler (6 August 1917 – 29 November 1944) was a RAAF Flying Officer who was killed while flying a raid over Germany in WWII. He had been a top-grade rugby league footballer who played in the 1930s and 1940s for North Sydney in the NSWRL competition.

== Background and rugby career ==
Butler was born in Tenterfield, New South Wales on 6 August 1917. He represented New South Wales in 1938 before signing with North Sydney in 1940. Butler played occasional games for Norths between 1940 and 1943 while he was training with the RAAF.

In 1943, North Sydney made the NSWRL grand final against Newtown. Norths would lose the match 34–7 at the Sydney Cricket Ground. North Sydney's loss in the grand final was attributed to the fact that Butler along with Harry Taylor and a couple of other players did not play in the game due to their service during war time.

== Military service ==
Butler enlisted with the RAAF in 1940. He was a Flying Officer and flew with RAAF 460 Squadron in World War II. Butler was killed on 29 November 1944 when his plane was shot down over Germany.
