= Leo Doyle =

Australian rugby league footballer and administrator

Personal information
- Full name: Leo Paul Doyle
- Born: 25 January 1923
- Died: 27 December 2015 (aged 92) Jilliby, New South Wales

Playing information
- Position: Five-eighth
Club
Years	Team	Pld	T	G	FG	P
1944–46	St. George	27	8	44	0	112
Representative
Years	Team	Pld	T	G	FG	P
1943	NSW Country	1	0	0	0	0

Leo Paul Doyle (1923-2015) was an Australian rugby league footballer who played in the 1940s.

== Career ==
Wollongong born, Doyle was a young footballer in the Illawarra Competition in the early 1940s.

Doyle dominated Illawarra Rugby League in 1943. Not only was he a key member of the Illawarra Premiership winning team, he was awarded the Alex Jack Memorial Trophy as the best under 21 player and he was the Group 7 five eighth for the Country Week games against Sydney clubs.

He played strongly for Group 7 and it was no surprise when he was selected as five eighth for NSW Country Firsts in their annual match with City at the Sydney Cricket Ground on 12 June 1943. In a high scoring game, City won by 37-25 but Leo impressed many people with his display.

After approaches from several Sydney clubs, Doyle joined the St. George Dragons for three seasons in 1944. In that first season he was St. George's top first grade point scorer with 87 (five tries, 36 goals). When he left the Dragons he had played 27 first grade games and scored 112 points (eight tries, 44 goals).

A back injury suffered towards the end of 1945, slowed him down in 1946 and he played just a handful of minor grade games for Saints. While with St. George, Leo played in the 1944 semi final at the SCG on 26 August against Newtown.

Doyle finished his career at Albion Park Rugby League Football Club in 1953.

Leo Doyle died at Jilliby, New South Wales on 27 December 2015, age 92.
