= Charles Cahill (rugby league) =

Australian rugby league footballer, coach and administrator

Personal information
- Full name: Charles Lawrence Cahill
- Born: 28 January 1916 Wickham, New South Wales, Australia
- Died: 14 July 2007 (aged 91) Ashmore, Queensland, Australia

Playing information
- Position: Prop, Second-row
Club
| Years | Team | Pld | T | G | FG | P |
|---|---|---|---|---|---|---|
| 1936–40 | Norths (Newcastle) | | | | | 207 |
| 1941–47 | Newtown | 75 | 29 | 0 | 0 | 87 |
| | Total | 75 | 29 | 0 | 0 | 294 |

Coaching information
Club
| Years | Team | Gms | W | D | L | W% |
| 1959–61 | Newtown | 56 | 21 | 0 | 35 | 38 |
- Source: Whiticker

Charles Lawrence "Chicka" Cahill (28 January 1916 – 14 July 2007) was an Australian premiership-winning rugby league footballer. He played in the forwards for the Newtown club in the New South Wales Rugby Football League premiership from 1941 to 1947.

== Playing career ==
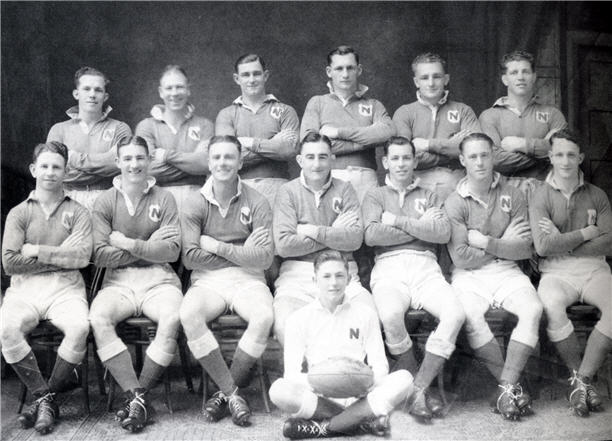
Cahill (1st row 3rd from left) in the Newtown 1943 premiership team

Born in Wickham, New South Wales, Cahill's first senior football was played in the Newcastle Rugby League with the Northern Suburbs club. He came to Sydney during WWII joining Newtown from the 1941 season. Cahill first enjoyed premiership success in the 1943 season with Newtown. His good form continued in the 1944 season, as he helped Newtown become minor premiers and runners-up.

In the 1945 season Cahill was the competition's top try-scorer. He also represented New South Wales in the 1940s and was probably denied international representative honours due to the war.

== Coaching and Administrative career ==
He took up coaching with the Thirlmere club in the Wollongong competition from 1948 to 1950. He then coached Newtown from 1959 to 1961, later becoming an administrator at the club, holding the positions of selector, vice-president, secretary and president in the 1960s and 1970s. He was awarded life membership of the NSWRFL in 1966 for his contribution to rugby league.

Cahill was voted as President of Newtown Jets in 1978, getting in by one vote when club millionaire backer, John Singleton, stated he would pull his support for the club if Chicka Cahill lost the vote.

Cahill died on 14 July 2007 at Hillview House, an aged care facility at Ashmore, Queensland, age 91.

== Sources ==
- Alan Whiticker & Glen Hudson (2007). The Encyclopedia of Rugby League Players. Wetherill Park, New South Wales: Gary Allen Pty Ltd. p. 70. ISBN 978-1-877082-93-1.
