= Gordon McLennan (rugby league) =

Australian rugby league footballer

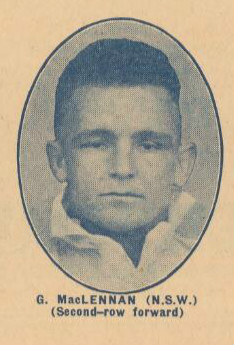
- Gordon McLennan. 1937

Personal information
- Full name: Gordon Douglas McLennan
- Born: 30 January 1914; Hay, New South Wales, Australia
- Died: 4 January 1966 (aged 51); Marrickville, New South Wales, Australia

Playing information
- Position: Prop
Club
Years	Team	Pld	T	G	FG	P
1934–45	Newtown	94	5	0	0	15
Representative
Years	Team	Pld	T	G	FG	P
1937	New South Wales	1	1	0	0	3
1937–38	Australia	0	0	0	0	0
1937	NSW Country	1	0	0	0	0

Gordon Douglas McLennan (1914–1966) was an Australian professional rugby league footballer who played in the 1930s and 1940s. An Australia national and New South Wales state representative forward, he played his club football in Sydney for Newtown (with whom he won the 1943 NSWRFL Premiership), as well as in country New South Wales.

== Playing career ==
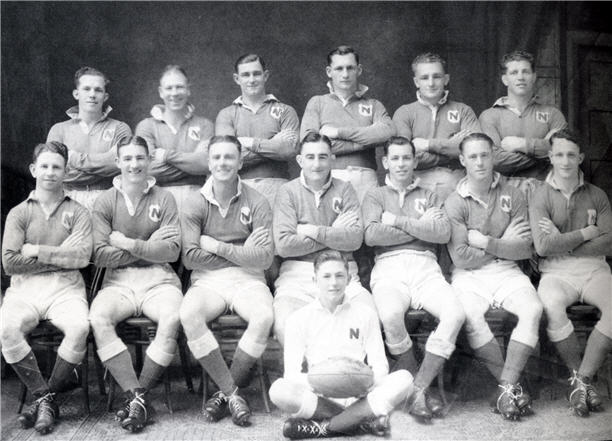
McLennan (back row 2nd from right) in the Newtown 1943 premiership team

A local Newtown junior player, McLennan came through the ranks to become a first grade player in 1934. A wharf laborer throughout his life, McLennan was a feared front-row forward who played with Newtown for ten seasons between 1934-1937 and 1940–1945. His representative career was only one appearance for New South Wales in 1937, although he was selected to tour with the 1937/38 Kangaroos and played 16 minor matches. He is listed on the Australian Players Register as Kangaroo No. 211.

The highlight of McLennan's club career was winning the 1943 Grand Final with Newtown, partnering the iconic Frank 'Bumper' Farrell in the front row. McLennan also had a stint as captain-coach of Cooma rugby league club in 1938–1939.

== Death ==
McLennan died on 4 January 1966 from a heart attack, age 51.
