= Paddy Bugden =

Australian rugby league footballer

Personal information
- Full name: Patrick Alfred Bugden
- Born: 18 December 1918; Lismore, New South Wales, Australia
- Died: 17 February 1993 (aged 74); Strathfield, New South Wales, Australia

Playing information
- Position: Halfback
Club
Years	Team	Pld	T	G	FG	P
1942–43	Newtown	30	3	0	0	9
1944	Western Suburbs	7	0	0	0	0
1945–47	Newtown	19	6	0	0	18
	Total	56	9	0	0	27

Coaching information
Club
Years	Team	Gms	W	D	L	W%
1944	Western Suburbs	7	3	1	3	43

Patrick Alfred 'Paddy' Bugden (18 December 1918 – 17 February 1993) was an Australian rugby league footballer who played in the 1940s.

== Playing career ==
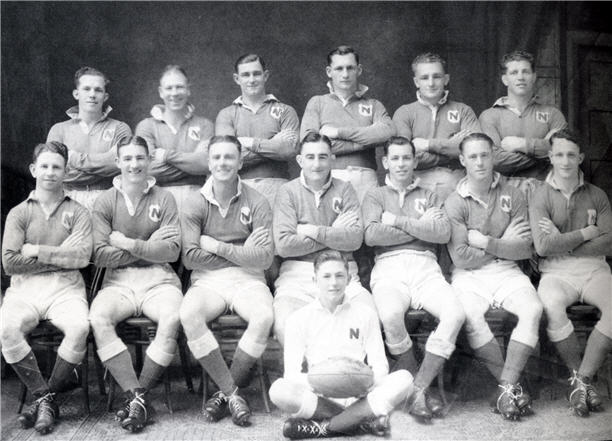
Bugden (1st row far left) in the Newtown 1943 premiership team

Bugden started his rugby league career at Marist Brothers, Lismore, New South Wales. He was a half-back who played five seasons for Newtown between 1942–1943 and 1945–1947. He also played one season with Western Suburbs in 1944.

The highlight of his career was playing in Newtown's winning 1943 Grand Final winning team that defeated North Sydney.

Bugden died on 17 February 1993, aged 74.
