= Sid Goodwin =

Australia international rugby league footballer

Personal information
- Full name: Sidney Albert Goodwin
- Born: 11 November 1914 Marrickville, New South Wales, Australia
- Died: 24 March 1980 (aged 65) Wollongong, New South Wales, Australia

Playing information
- Position: Wing
Club
Years	Team	Pld	T	G	FG	P
1933–42	Balmain	118	86	2	0	262
1943–45	Newtown	41	42	0	0	126
	Total	159	128	2	0	388
Representative
Years	Team	Pld	T	G	FG	P
1938–40	New South Wales	12	14	0	0	42
1935	Australia	3	2	0	0	6
1938–44	NSW City	3	4	0	0	12
- Source: As of 23 June 2026

Sid Goodwin (1914–1980) was an Australian rugby league footballer who played in the 1930s and 1940s. He played on the wing for the Balmain and Newtown clubs in the New South Wales Rugby Football League premiership and also represented New South Wales and Australia. Goodwin played 11 seasons for the Balmain club between 1933–1942 then moved to the Newtown club for 3 seasons between 1943–1945. He was selected to play for New South Wales in 1938, 1939, 1940 and 1944.

== Balmain ==
In 1935, Goodwin took Balmain's club record for most tries in a match with 5 against University on 4 April. Also in 1935, he was also selected to represent Australia in all three Tests against New Zealand. He is listed on the Australian Players Register as kangaroo No. 199. In 1936 he played in his first Grand Final, scoring a try in Balmain's loss to Easts.

Balmain Premiers 1939 - Captain Sid Goodwin

In 1939 Goodwin was the premiership's top try-scorer and also captained the Balmain side that won the 1939 Grand Final. By the time he left Balmain he'd set the club's records for most tries in a season and most career tries. Goodwin was inducted into the Balmain Tigers Hall of Fame on 20 March 2007.

== Newtown ==
After moving to Newtown in 1943, Goodwin enjoyed further premiership success in NSWRFL season 1943, scoring a double in that year's Grand Final. He was again the League's top try-scorer in 1943 and 1944. In 1944 he again played for Newtown in the Grand Final, but failed to win against his old club, Balmain.

== Post-playing ==
Goodwin lived for most of his life in Marrickville, New South Wales, but moved to Windang, New South Wales in his retirement. He died there on 24 March 1980, age 65. He was cremated at Wollongong Crematorium on 26 March 1980.
