= Johnny McLachlan =

Australian rugby league footballer

Personal information
- Full name: John Angus McLachlan
- Born: 1919
- Died: 13 November 1989 (aged 69–70)

Playing information
- Position: Halfback
Club
Years	Team	Pld	T	G	FG	P
1940–45	North Sydney	53	10	0	0	30

Johnny McLachlan was an Australian rugby league footballer who played in the 1940s. He played in the NSWRFL premiership for North Sydney as a halfback.

== Playing career ==
McLachlan began his first grade career in 1940 and was a member of the North Sydney side which made the grand final in 1943. McLachlan scored the only try in the game for Norths as they lost the match to Newtown 34–7 in front of a then record crowd for a grand final. This would prove to be the last time the club made the grand final before exiting the competition in 1999. McLachlan played two further seasons before retiring at the end of 1945.
