= Frank Collins (rugby league) =

Australian rugby league football

Personal information
- Full name: Frank Leslie Collins
- Born: 18 June 1917 Waverley, New South Wales, Australia
- Died: 3 May 1999 (aged 81)

Playing information
- Position: Wing
Club
Years	Team	Pld	T	G	FG	P
1942–45	North Sydney	39	17	20	0	91
Representative
Years	Team	Pld	T	G	FG	P
1942–43	Sydney Firsts	2	2	0	0	6
1946	Auckland	1	0	0	0	0
- Military career
- Allegiance: Australia
- Branch: Royal Australian Navy
- Service years: 1940-1946
- Conflicts: World War II

Frank Collins was an Australian rugby league footballer who played in the 1940s. He played in the NSWRFL premiership for North Sydney as a winger.

== Playing career ==
Collins began his first grade career in 1942 and in 1943 was part of the North Sydney side which reached the grand final that year against Newtown which Norths lost 34–7. This would prove to be the last grand final North Sydney played in until they exited the competition in 1999.

Collins also played representative football for NSW City/Sydney firsts in 1942 and 1943 scoring 2 tries in 2 games. Collins retired at the end of the 1946 season.
