= Cyril McMahon =

Australian rugby league footballer

Personal information
- Full name: Cyril Francis McMahon
- Born: 1 February 1922 Sydney, New South Wales, Australia
- Died: 7 May 1986 (aged 64) Brookvale, New South Wales, Australia

Playing information
- Position: Five-eighth
Club
Years	Team	Pld	T	G	FG	P
1943–46	North Sydney	52	36	4	0	116
1947–50	Manly-Warringah	35	17	48	0	147
	Total	87	53	52	0	263

Cyril McMahon nicknamed "Kelly" was an Australian professional rugby league footballer who played in the 1940s and 1950s. He played in the NSWRFL premiership for North Sydney and Manly-Warringah as a five-eighth.

== Playing career ==
McMahon began his first grade career in 1943. That same year McMahon played at five-eighth in North's 1943 grand final defeat against Newtown which would prove to be the club's last grand final appearance before exiting the competition in 1999.

In 1947, McMahon joined Manly and played in their inaugural game against Western Suburbs which Wests won 15–13. McMahon was top point scorer for the club that season in which Manly narrowly avoided the wooden spoon by two competition points.

McMahon played for a further three seasons for Manly before retiring at the end of the 1950 season.
