= Norm Jacobson =

Australian rugby league footballer

Personal information
- Full name: Norman Raymond Jacobson
- Born: 31 October 1917 Parramatta, New South Wales, Australia
- Died: 13 January 1994 (aged 76) Ayr, Queensland, Australia

Playing information
- Position: Wing, Centre
Club
Years	Team	Pld	T	G	FG	P
1942–48	Newtown	89	69	0	0	207
Representative
Years	Team	Pld	T	G	FG	P
1944–48	City NSW	3	4	0	0	12
1945	New South Wales	1	1	0	0	3
1950	Country NSW	1	0	0	0	0
1951	Western Districts

Norman Raymond Jacobson (31 October 1917 – 13 January 1994) was an Australian rugby league footballer who played in the 1940s. A New South Wales representative three-quarter back, he played his club football career in the NSWRFL Premiership for the Newtown club.

A centre and prolific try-scorer, Jacobson played in Newtown's grand final win in 1943. After returning from interstate Army service, he resumed playing for Newtown the following year and played in the 1944 grand final loss. In his final season at Newtown, Jacobson was the League's top try-scorer, with 27 tries from 19 appearances. Jacobsen was selected to captain Western Districts when they hosted the 1951 French touring side and lost. After retiring from playing football, he coached Condobolin's rugby league side.

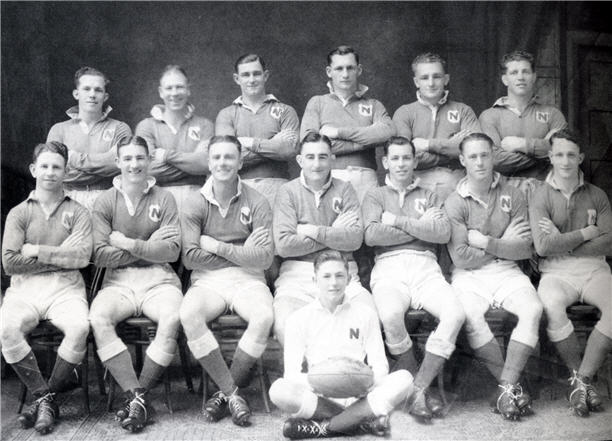
Jacobson, (front row 2nd from left) in the Newtown 1943 premiership team
