= Frank Dreise =

Australian rugby league footballer (1914–1998)

Personal information
- Full name: Francis William Dreise
- Born: 23 March 1914 Grafton, New South Wales, Australia
- Died: 28 September 1998 (aged 84)

Playing information
- Position: Halfback, Five-eighth
Club
Years	Team	Pld	T	G	FG	P
1942–44	Balmain Tigers	30	14	40	0	122

Francis William Dreise (23 March 1914 – 28 September 1998) was an Australian rugby league footballer.

A native of Grafton, Dreise was a New South Wales Country representative player in 1940 and played for Cessnock in the Newcastle league prior to joining Balmain for the 1942 NSWRFL season, where he played mainly in the halves. His most noted contribution at Balmain came in a large win over Western Suburbs at Pratten Park in 1944 when he kicked a club record 22 points, with 11 goals from 14 attempts. He was their regular halfback that season, but missed the grand final win over Newtown, having lost his place to Pat Devery.
