= Ted Rudd (rugby league) =

Australian rugby league footballer

Personal information
- Full name: Edward Gordon Rudd
- Born: 25 January 1921 Narrandera, New South Wales, Australia
- Died: 6 July 1991 (aged 70) Kincumber New South Wales, Australia

Playing information
- Position: Centre
Club
Years	Team	Pld	T	G	FG	P
1943–44	North Sydney	20	4	51	0	114
- Source: As of 25 June 2019

Ted Rudd (1921-1991) was an Australian rugby league footballer who played in the 1940s. He played in the NSWRFL premiership for North Sydney as a centre.

== Playing career ==
Formerly a player from Wagga Wagga, New South Wales, Rudd made his debut for Norths in 1943, the same year the club made the grand final against Newtown. Norths had defeated Newtown on three occasions throughout the year and were favorites heading into the game but lost the match 34–7 with Rudd kicking two goals.

This would prove to be the last time North Sydney made a grand final before exiting the competition in 1999. Rudd played the following season in 1944 before retiring from rugby league.

Rudd was also a first grade cricketer for Manly
