= Frank Farrell (rugby league) =

Australian RL coach and former Australia international rugby league footballer

- Farrell in 1943

Personal information
- Full name: Francis Michael Farrell
- Born: 16 September 1917 Surry Hills, New South Wales, Australia
- Died: 23 April 1985 (aged 67) Warriewood, New South Wales, Australia

Playing information
- Position: Front row forward
Club
Years	Team	Pld	T	G	FG	P
1938–51	Newtown	204	24	0	0	72
Representative
Years	Team	Pld	T	G	FG	P
1939–50	New South Wales	17	1	0	0	3
1946–48	Australia	4	0	0	0	0

Coaching information
Club
Years	Team	Gms	W	D	L	W%
1945–51	Newtown	118	70	5	43	59
- Spouse: Phyllis Dorothy Read (m. 1944; died 1981)
- Relatives: Jack Elsegood (grandson)

Francis Michael "Bumper" Farrell (16 September 1917 – 23 April 1985) was an Australian premiership winning and international representative rugby league footballer. A prop forward, his long club career with the Newtown Bluebags was from 1938 to 1951 with four Test appearances for the Australian national side between 1946 and 1948.

Farrell also served as a policeman in the New South Wales force; where he earned a divisive reputation as a detective in the Vice Squad.

== Early life ==
Farrell was the great-grandson of Irish convict Patrick Farrell, who was transported to Sydney in 1837 for stealing a pig. His father, Sydney-born Reginald Francis Farrell (1889–1983), was a jeweller, while his mother, Scottish-born Margaret Theresa Wynne (1886–1977) was an ironing lady. His parents were married in 1913. Frank, their second child, was born at St. Margaret's Hospital in Surry Hills, an inner suburb of Sydney. He was brought up in Redfern, Tempe, Arncliffe and Marrickville. Frank was educated at Patrician Brothers' school, Redfern and Marist College Kogarah, and remained a committed Roman Catholic throughout his life.

Frank Farrell married Phyllis Dorothy Read (1912–1981) on 11 November 1944 and the couple had two sons and two daughters.

== Footballer ==
Farrell was a rugby league footballer with a long sporting career.

Graded in 1936, he made his début for the Newtown Rugby League Football Club's first-grade team in the 1938 NSWRFL season. He played his entire New South Wales Rugby Football League premiership career of over 250 games with the Newtown club. He made his state representative debut for New South Wales against Queensland in 1939 and went on to play thirteen career matches for his state. He became captain of the club in 1942, leading them to victory in the 1943 NSWRFL season Premiership Final against North Sydney. One of Farrell's closest and lifelong friends, Frank Hyde, was his opposing captain that day.

Farrell was captain in 1944 when Newtown finished the regular season on top of the table. Decimated by injuries and the active-duty call up of servicemen Len Smith and Herb Narvo who had starred for them all season the Bluebags were beaten by Balmain 16–19 in a Final. Newtown exercised their "right of challenge" as minor premiers and called for a Grand final in which Farrell led the side. Balmain again prevailed in a low scoring match when their representative centre Joe Jorgenson kicked two late penalty goals to give the Tigers a 12–8 win. In a famous incident during a game on 28 July 1945, he was accused of biting off a portion of St. George player Bill McRitchie's ear during a match at Henson Park. He formally denied the allegation at the time. It took seven months for the New South Wales Rugby League judiciary to finalise their inquiry and Farrell was found not guilty.

After the war, he made his international representative debut for Australia in the 1946 Test series against the Great Britain Lions, becoming Kangaroo No. 223. He played in all three matches of the series. It was a violent era and every team had three or four 'enforcers'. Greg Ellis, who was the Newtown ball boy in Bumper's day, said he only ever saw two blokes get the better of him. One was George Jardine, of St. George, and the other was the enormous British prop Frank Whitcombe. During the brutal exchanges in the first test Bumper was 'King Hit' by Whitcombe when the unfortunate St John's ambulanceman ran on to treat him, a still groggy Farrell lashed out at him mistaking him for Whitcombe.

Farrell made another Test appearance against New Zealand in 1948. Farrell was captain-coach of the Newtown club from 1946 to 1951 and in that six-year period the club made the finals on four occasions. He retired in 1951 and was at that time the first Sydney top-grade player with 250 grade games for his club. He remains today the only player to top 200 first-grade appearances for Newtown. He later served a long term as President of the Newtown Jets. Former Mayor of Newtown Joe Bugler described him as the "greatest man God ever put breath into".

== Police Career ==
While playing football, Farrell was employed in the New South Wales Police Force in a career that lasted from 1938 to 1976.

He was a sergeant of the 21st Division Darlinghurst (Kings Cross) police station in Sydney and a member of the Vice Squad. His highest rank was Inspector 1st Class.

Farrell was known to harass and intimidate local business people and residents, particularly anyone considered "bohemian."

Residents of Darlinghurst at the time recall,

"Some of the gambling dives were chockablock with thuggish cops, like Bumper Farrell, whose reputation for turncoat behaviour was legendary. Farrell hunted vagrants (and anyone he didn't like the look of, myself included) to boost the score of arrests at Paddington Police Station, while turning a blind eye to grander villainy".

"The Darlinghurst police back in those days with Bumper Farrell, they weren't very nice. They'd put you in a steel-built cabinet and rock you round the room. Then they'd get you out and throw you on the ground and get telephone books and jump on top of the phone books. But they'd never leave a mark". Debra Deveraux, George Negus Tonight, ABC, 2004.

In the 1950s Melbourne newspaper Truth ran the headline "Sex Chocolates: Anna Hoffmann Strikes Again." Anna Hoffman was an alleged sex worker, who allegedly spiked Farrell's food with marijuana during a tryst with him, whilst recording the event with equipment placed under her bed. Hoffman had also previously threatened to expose details of corruption within the Darlinghurst police force. She was allegedly deported.

Bill Jenkings, a well-known Australian writer and newspaper reporter, who knew Farrell personally, disputed Farrell's alleged involvement in corrupt activities. Writing in his biography As Crime Goes By.. (Ironbark Press, 1992), Jenkings stated that Farrell would constantly harass "the Queens of Sydney's underworld," Tilly Devine and Kate Leigh, writing that "he'd run them in every chance that he got."

A biography called Bumper: The Life and Times of Frank Bumper Farrell (2011), by author Larry Writer, states "[Farrell] enforced law the 'Bumper' way, with his fists and boots, and by his own moral code, which while terribly politically incorrect, was certainly effective. He was the toughest, roughest street cop that Australia has ever seen." Farrell retired, and was awarded the Queen's Police Medal for Distinguished Service on 1 January 1976.

== Death and legacy ==
Frank Farrell died suddenly of a heart attack at his home on 23 April 1985. His funeral service was attended by many police and football colleagues and was widely reported in the national media. He was later buried at Mona Vale Cemetery on 3 May 1985. Frank Farrell was survived by his four children and many grandchildren.

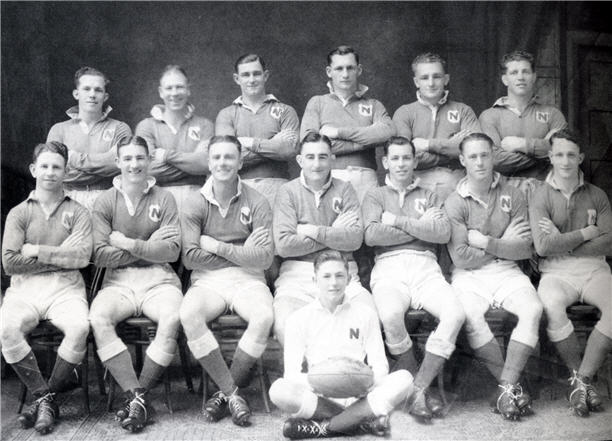
Farrell, (front row, centre) in the Newtown 1943 premiership team

Farrell's grandson Jack Elsegood became a prominent rugby league footballer as well.

In 2008, Rugby League's centenary year in Australia, Farrell was named at prop forward in both the NSW Police and Newtown Jets Teams of the Century. He was named captain in the Newtown Team.

Farrell's name was immortalised in Farrell Avenue, Darlinghurst. He was also mentioned by Sydney folk punk rockers The Rumjacks in their song "Sober and Godless." In the song, from the album of the same name, the singer recounts how "I could dead-lift a barrel, / Flog the arse off 'Bumper' Farrell..."

== Bibliography ==
- Whiticker, Alan & Collis, Ian (2006) The History of Rugby League Clubs, New Holland, Sydney
- Larry Writer. BUMPER – The life and times of Frank 'Bumper' Farrell., Published by Hachette, Australia. 2011. (ISBN 978 0 7336 2489 6).
- Terry Williams. THROUGH BLUE EYES – A Pictorial History of Newtown RLFC. Published by Ligare Books, Sydney. (2008)
