= Keith Phillips =

Australian rugby league footballer

Personal information
- Full name: Harold Keith Kitchener Phillips
- Born: 11 November 1915 West Wyalong, New South Wales, Australia
- Died: 5 July 1974 (aged 58) Griffith, New South Wales, Australia

Playing information
- Height: 6 ft 2 in (1.88 m)
- Position: Second-row
Club
Years	Team	Pld	T	G	FG	P
1940–46	Newtown	90	22	0	0	66
- Spouse: Phyllis Lind (m. 1943)
- Relatives: Fred Lind (brother-in-law)

Keith Phillips (1915-1974) was an Australian professional rugby league footballer who played in the 1940s. He played for Newtown in the New South Wales Rugby League (NSWRL) competition, as a second-row.

== Playing career ==
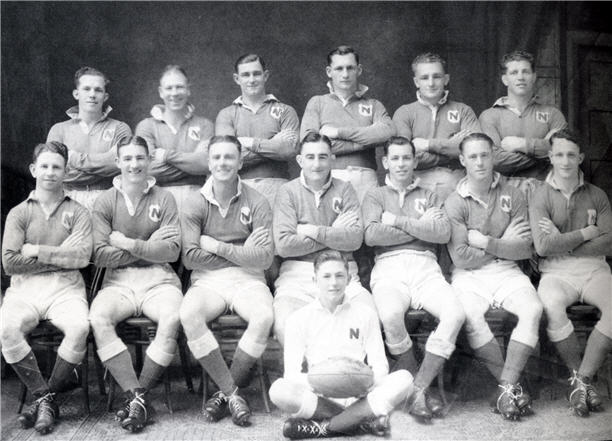
Phillips (back row 3rd from right) in the Newtown 1943 premiership team

Phillips made his first grade debut for Newtown in 1940. In 1943, Phillips was a member of the Newtown side which won their third and last premiership, defeating North Sydney 34–7 in the grand final, with Phillips scoring a try.

The following season, Phillips was a member of the Newtown side which finished as minor premiers and reached the 1944 grand final against Balmain. Newtown lost the first grand final 19–16, but as minor premiers they had the right to challenge for a rematch. Newtown lost the second grand final replay, 12–8. Phillips played two further seasons before retiring at the end of the 1946 season.

Phillips married Phyllis Lind, the sister of Newtown player Fred Lind in Marrickville on 6 November 1943.
