= Tim Pickup =

Australian rugby league footballer (1948–2021)

Personal information
- Born: 6 October 1948 Sydney, New South Wales, Australia
- Died: 7 June 2021 (aged 72)

Playing information
- Height: 170 cm (5 ft 7 in)
- Weight: 71 kg (11 st 3 lb)

Rugby union
Club
Years	Team	Pld	T	G	FG	P
1966–68	Manly RUFC

Rugby league
- Position: Five-eighth, Halfback, Fullback
Club
Years	Team	Pld	T	G	FG	P
1969	St Helens	0	0	0	0	0
1970–72	Blackpool Borough	46	13	0	0	39
1972–74	North Sydney Bears	52	10	2	0	34
1975–79	Canterbury-Bankstown	47	3	0	0	9
	Total	145	26	2	0	82
Representative
Years	Team	Pld	T	G	FG	P
1972–75	New South Wales	6	0	0	0	0
1972–75	Australia	11	1	0	0	3
1973–75	City NSW	3	0	0	0	0
- Education: Christian Brothers' High School, Lewisham
- Relatives: Laurie Pickup (uncle)

Timothy Alexander Pickup (6 October 1948 – 7 June 2021) was an Australian Rugby League footballer for the North Sydney Bears, Canterbury-Bankstown Bulldogs, New South Wales and Australian national side in the 1970s, playing his First Test for Australia in 1972, only 12 games after his NSWRL First Grade debut.

In retirement Pickup was involved in boxing at Newtown PCYC and was Jeff Harding's manager when he won the WBC World Light-Heavyweight title in 1989. He was the foundation CEO of the Adelaide Rams franchise of the Australian Super League in 1995. In 2000 he was awarded the Australian Sports Medal for services to Australian sport. Pickup was named in the North Sydney Bears Team of the Century in 2006 and was a finalist for both the Canterbury-Bankstown Bulldogs 70th Anniversary team as well as Manly Rugby Union's Team of the Century.

== Early years ==
Tim Pickup was born in Sydney, New South Wales, Australia, as the second of three sons to Harrie and Mary Pickup. His father Harrie was a lower-grade player for St. George and Eastern Suburbs, and his brother, Laurie Pickup was a First Grade Rugby League player.

== Enfield Federals ==
Tim Pickup played with the junior team of the Enfield Federals from 1959 to 1965, very successful years for the club (managed by Pickup's father Harrie), who were such a dominant side that they went undefeated for seven years. That came to an end in the 1965 Grand Final, Pickup's last ever match for the club. During the Federals reign they quickly ran out of opponents, having to play up an age group to get a game and eventually had to shift to other Junior Leagues to be accommodated. In 1965, Western Suburbs Magpies RLFC called upon Pickup and teammate Neville Hornery to play in the 3rd grade open-age semi-finals, but Harrie Pickup deemed his son to be too young for this promotion at only 16 years of age.

Pickup did his schooling at St. Patrick's Strathfield, and graduated from Christian Brothers Lewisham in 1965. He was offered a high school scholarship to storied Rugby Union nursery, St. Joseph's Hunter's Hill, but declined for at that time was not a fan of Rugby Union. At the end of 1965 Harrie Pickup moved his family to the Northern Beaches, as all three brothers had discovered surfing and were regulars on the Peninsula. The Pickups settled in Curl Curl, New South Wales.

== Manly Rugby Union ==
Pickup's Rugby League career stalled when his family relocated to Sydney's Northern Beaches, as the Western Suburbs RLFC did not grant a transfer/release for him to play with any other club. Instead, he went with a colleague to the Manly Rugby Union Club, and was named starting First Grade stand-off in the first game of the 1966 season, aged 17. He then played three consecutive years at five-eighth/stand-off, until the 1968 Grand Final which they lost to Sydney University, 23–6. Following that season, Pickup set off to England on a working holiday, and did not return to Australia until 1972.

== England ==
After traveling in Europe and the Middle East, Pickup and his friends eventually arrived in England. He was spotted playing touch football in a London park, and was invited for a trial by rugby league club St Helens. He debuted for the 'A' team in September 1969, but was not offered a contract and never made any first team appearances for the club.

He later signed for Blackpool Borough where he played fullback alongside Billy Boston, at the end of his career, and Allan Bishop. In 1969, Pickup was deported to the United States, as his last port of call, for overstaying his visa.

During this period Pickup lived in a homeless hostel in New York, and hitched a ride to the Woodstock music festival with fellow residents. He also tracked down his hero Sugar Ray Robinson, following him and his entourage on their daily run through Central Park. He was accosted by Robinson's minders when they were alerted to his pattern of following their group. Pickup managed to avoid a beating by establishing himself as a genuine fan, and amusing Robinson. He then trained with the group until his visa was cleared and he was able to return to England.

In 1971 Pickup married his wife Jan, an AMP colleague, with Allan Bishop as his Best Man. Jan flew over to join him once his visa status was resolved and he was readmitted to the UK. Pickup was named Blackpool's player of the year for the consecutive 1970 and 1971 seasons, but began to consider leaving when unable to get a recall to St. Helens' first team. However, his performances for Blackpool Borough began to generate high interest back in Australia, and he eventually decided to return.

== North Sydney Bears ==
When Pickup returned to Sydney he resumed his career in finance with AMP, and his career in Rugby League with the North Sydney Bears (#691). Pickup stated that Norths were the team that had suffered the longest drought between premierships, and he wanted to make a difference.

He was partnered with Keith 'Chicka' Outten in the halves. The pair were an effective defensive duo, with Outten playing the organisational role in attack, where Pickup assumed the role of running back. With Ross Warner, Keith Harris, and Bruce Walker in the forwards, and the hard playing surface itself, North Sydney became a tough opposition for visitors.

Although Norths fortunes improved during Pickup's brief time at the club, they never made the final five playoff series, and hovered around the middle of the ladder when coached by Noel Kelly for the 1973 and 1974 seasons. Their highest finish was 6th, lowest 9th in the 12 team NSWRL competition.

Pickup was successful at representative level in 1972 and was playing for Australia after 12 games for the Bears. Pickup was chosen for City Seconds then played two games for New South Wales (NSW #664), wearing no.15. Pickup was a late inclusion to the starting side, replacing incumbent state and Australian pivot Denis Pittard. He took advantage of the opportunity and was a key contributor to the convincing 29-5 victory over QLD. Pittard returned to the starting line-up in the second game, but selectors opted for Pickup, then 23 years old, when he was selected for the Australian national team (#462) alongside Norths teammate George Ambrum.

When first chosen for the Australian team, Pickup gave his first jersey to his Bears halves partner Keith Outten, in recognition of his contribution to Pickup's achievements. Pickup played two Tests against New Zealand in 1972 partnering Tommy Raudonikis in the halves, and Bob Fulton in the centres, a combination which was used regularly by selectors over the next four seasons.

Tim Pickup was the only North Sydney Bears player selected for the 26-man Kangaroos squad that toured Europe in 1973, captain-coached by Graeme Langlands. Pickup played in 14 out of 19 tour games, behind Arthur Beetson with 15, and also played in four of the five test matches, including the 21–12 First Test defeat to Great Britain at Wembley, and the third match to decide the series.

Pickup generally played at five-eighth, though he was selected at halfback in the 2nd Test against France. On the 13th Kangaroo Tour, Australia successfully retained the Ashes with a 2–1 series win over Great Britain, and a 2–0 series win against France, where Arthur Beetson became the first Indigenous Australian to captain an Australian team in any sport. The Kangaroos had an overall tally of 17 wins from 19 games. Their only other loss was against St. Helens. Pickup's last Test Match for Australia as a North Sydney Bear was against the touring Great Britain side in the 1974 series. He was named the Bears' player of the year for the 1973 and 1974 seasons.

Frustrated at some of North Sydney's policies towards their players, Pickup subsequently signed a well-remunerated five-year contract to captain Canterbury-Bankstown, (#406) then known as the Berries.

== Canterbury-Bankstown Bulldogs ==
Pickup's tenure with Canterbury-Bankstown started in 1975. He led the team as captain after the club's loss in the 1974 NSWRFL season's grand final. However, he severely injured his knee, tearing his anterior cruciate ligament in a World Cup match against England in June of that season. Canterbury were in third place at that time and eventually were knocked out in the major semi-final; Pickup did not play again that season, and missed the entire 1976 season after knee reconstructions.

During his rehabilitation Souths legends' Bob McCarthy joined in 1976 and Gary Stevens in 1977, after Pickup initially recruited them to Norths. When Pickup switched to Belmore, both Rabbitohs eventually followed him. After 18 months out, Pickup returned to the field in 1977, playing a few Reserve Grade games to ensure his fitness for the First Grade squad. Upon his return to the top squad, Pickup was forced to adapt to a different style of play, as his play had less speed and agility than before. Paired in the halves with Steve Mortimer for the first time, Pickup assumed the organisational role to Mortimer's unorthodox running halfback. Pickup shared captain duties with Bob McCarthy and George Peponis for the rest of the season and the team finished in 7th place, out of final five contention.

In 1978 McCarthy returned to South Sydney, and Peponis and Pickup shared captaincy of the newly renamed Bulldogs. The team had an effective combination in Mortimer and Pickup, leading to a good season, making the finals in fifth place. Pickup was named KB Player of the week across the entire competition in May, and performed effectively within his enforced physical limitations. Canterbury went out in the first week of the finals to Parramatta by 22–15. The Eels lost to eventual premiership winners Manly 17–11 in a midweek replay, three days after a 13–13 draw, and a week after their victory over the Bulldogs.

Pickup was talked out of retirement by Canterbury patriarch Peter Moore, and played in Reserve Grade as insurance for first team injuries. Pickup played one more First Grade game in the 1979 season, before going into a mentoring role for the next generation of the club's players over the next decade, including Chris Anderson, Steve Folkes, George Peponis, Greg Brentnall and the Mortimer brothers, Steve, Peter and Chris. Steve Mortimer devoted a chapter to this in his biography Top Dog, titled "Toughened by Tim (Pickup) Tom (Raudonikis) and Terry (Lamb)."

Tim Pickup finished his career at Belmore as captain of the 2nd Grade side in a Grand Final loss to Parramatta. He was named Canterbury-Bankstown Bulldogs Clubman of the Year in 1979.

== Post Rugby League career ==
Tim Pickup worked for AMP from the mid-1960s to the mid-1990s as a financial planner. He also owned a chain of donut stores in three Sydney locations: Chatswood, Birkenhead Point and Hurstville. He also managed boxer Jeff 'Hitman' Harding when he won the WBC Light-Heavyweight world title in 1989.

Upon Tim Pickup's retirement as a player from the Bulldogs at the end of the 1979 season, Peter "Bullfrog" Moore convinced Pickup to move into team administration, and he became the director of the football club, until the end of the 1995 season, and again from 2002 to 2004. In 1985, Pickup was awarded life membership at Canterbury-Bankstown for his 10 years of continuous service with the team.

As a scout, his discoveries included Australian defender David Gillespie in 1982, as well as brokering a deal with his former club Norths for Daryl Halligan in 1994, and signing Willie Tonga in 2004 from Parramatta Reserve Grade, who went on to have one of the most successful individual seasons in NRL history.

After a 1995 detour to Super League as CEO of the now defunct Adelaide Rams, Pickup received a Rupert Murdoch 'golden handshake', and went on safari in Africa for 1997.

After the Bulldogs won the 2004 NRL Premiership, Pickup resumed his relationship with the club as a member of their Ambassadors Club, a role that he maintained into the mid-2010s, until his health declined and he moved into a retirement home. During this period he rejoined their board in an official capacity after the 2002 Salary Cap Scandal, and stood down after the club won their last title in 2004. Pickup's was associated with the Canterbury-Bankstown Bulldogs for almost 50 years until his death in 2021.

== Super League ==
When Peter Moore decided to stand down from his post as Chief Executive of Canterbury in the mid-1990s, he offered the CEO position to Tim Pickup, who in turn declined for personal reasons. With the advent of Super League the following year in 1995, Moore campaigned heavily for Pickup to become Foundation CEO of the ill-fated Adelaide Rams Franchise, a position he accepted and held for just under a year.

Pickup was present for the entire Super League court proceedings as chief of the Rams. He moved on from that position into retirement after the ARL injunction prevented Super League from kicking off in the 1996 season and was delayed indefinitely. After traveling to Africa for a year in 1997, Pickup spent 1998 in Russia and Mongolia before returning to Australia and the Bulldogs in 1999, in an official capacity as a director in 2002.

== Salary cap scandal ==
In the wake of Canterbury's 2002 Salary Cap scandal, Pickup was recruited by CEO Steve Mortimer for his hand-picked Board, alongside several other former Bulldogs players including Clive Gartner, George Peponis and Terry Lamb, in an attempt to restore club pride after troubles under the previous management. Unprecedented NRL penalties included a record fine ($500K) and deduction of competition points (37) that sent the team from first to last place, claiming the wooden spoon on the back of 17 straight victories. Pickup stayed on until the club recovered, including through the Coffs Harbour scandal that followed two years later.

Pickup left the club in the aftermath of that incident, after the Bulldogs won the 2004 NRL Premiership, unhappy at the circumstances of the dismissal of former teammate Garry Hughes.

== Boxing ==
Tim Pickup was involved with Johnny Lewis and the Newtown Police Boys PCYC during Australian boxing's golden age, from the early 1980s. He ran a 40-minute circuit class twice a week that was attended by future boxing World Champions Jeff Fenech, Jeff Harding and Joe Bugner, as well as top level Rugby League players Steve Mortimer, Billy Johnstone, Pat Jarvis and Geordie Peats.

Pickup became Harding's manager after the boxer was selected in the Australian team for the 1986 Commonwealth Games in Edinburgh, Scotland. All members needed to raise $5,000 to get on the plane, so Pickup appealed to Canterbury-Bankstown Bulldogs boss Peter Moore, who agreed to the request. In return for the assistance, Harding walked into the ring for the gold medal bout wearing a Canterbury-Bankstown Bulldogs jersey, rather than the required Australian tracksuit. After Harding lost the bout and took the silver medal, he was informed by officials that he had disrespected the Australian team by wearing the Bulldogs jersey, and could no longer fight as an amateur, and should turn professional.

With Johnny Lewis as his trainer, Harding approached Pickup to be his manager as a professional fighter following the assistance that he provided in getting the boxer to Edinburgh. Pickup originally declined but was eventually talked into it by his good friend Lewis. Harding quickly rose in the rankings, as his style was much more suited to the professional ranks than the amateur criteria. Harding quickly went into world title calculations after a series of victories. He was undefeated when he was called upon as a last minute replacement to fight WBC Light-Heavyweight champion Dennis Andries in Atlantic City, USA in 1989.

After initially declining the WBC invitation due to inexperience, Lewis and Pickup reconsidered, fearing Harding may never get another such opportunity. Harding came from behind on points to win, knocking Andries down three times in the 12th and final round before the referee stopped the contest. Harding v Andries was named the World Boxing Council's Fight of the Year for 1989. Jeff Harding received the award from Mike Tyson at the 1990 WBC convention. The Ring magazine "The Bible of Boxing" listed the fight as no.58 in their 100 Greatest Title Fights of All-Time.

Pickup managed Harding for almost a decade, throughout eight world title fights. Harding won it twice, defended it four times and lost it twice.

== Honours ==
Pickup was awarded the Australian Sporting Medal in 2000 for services to Australian sport.

In August 2006 Pickup was named at five-eighth in the North Sydney Bears' Team of the Century.

Pickup was originally named in the Canterbury-Bankstown Bulldogs 70th Anniversary Team in 2004, (named one of the club's 20 greatest players, on the bench-not the starting line-up) but was omitted due to a technicality, when it was revealed he had only played 47 1st grade games and was three games short of the 50 game minimum.

Pickup was nominated as one of the final four five-eighths/stand-offs for Manly Rugby Union's Team of the Century in 2005.

Pickup was named Halfback and Captain of the Enfield Federals team of the Century in 2019.

Pickup was also named halfback on Roy Slaven and H.G. Nelson's 'All-time Mustachioed Rugby League Team' on their nationally syndicated show This Sporting Life, broadcast on Triple J radio in 1998.

== Death ==
Pickup died on 7 June 2021 after a long battle with dementia.

== Sources ==
- Bob Fulton's Rugby League By Peter Muszkat & Bob Fulton, Pot Still Press 1978
- Rugby League Week, April 1978 Front Cover 'Two Bulldogs KO'd...Doctor warns: Brain Damage Danger!' By Brad Boxall
- Berries to Bulldogs : Fifty years of Canterbury-Bankstown R.L.F.C. By Gary Lester, Lester-Townsend Publishing 1985.
- The story of Australian Rugby league. Page 257. By Gary Lester, lester-Townsend Publishing 1988.
- Sterlo! The story of a Champion – Peter Sterling. Page 43. By Ian Heads, Lester-Townsend Publishing 1989.
- Fatty and Chook: Laughing at League Paul Vautin and Johnny Raper tell football's funniest stories' Taking the plunge, pages 32,33. By Ian Heads, Lester-Townsend Publishing 1990.
- Jeff Fenech : I love youse all! By Terry Smith, Modern Publishing Group 1993.
- Straight between the posts: The legendary Frank Hyde and his stories By Ian Heads, Ironbark Pan MacMillan Publishing 1995.
- Rugby League Week - 25 Sensational Years. Page 82. By David Middleton, Harper Collins Publishers 1995.
- The mighty Bears - a social history of North Sydney Rugby league. Page 236. By Andrew Moore, Pan Macmillan Publishing 1996.
- The Encyclopedia of Rugby league Players' Tim Pickup, page 474. By Alan Whittaker & Glen Hudson, Gary Allen Publishing 2002.
- Big Artie – The autobiography of Arthur Beetson. Page 132 - Tim Pickup (The Grub). With Ian Heads, ABC Books 2004.
- Captaining the Kangaroos – Rugby League Test and World Cup Captains By Alan 126,,12, New Holland Publishing 2004.
- A Centenary of Rugby League 1908-2008 Pages 379 - (1972) and 464 (The 100 Greatest - Steve Rogers). By Ian heads & David Middleton, Pan Macmillan Publishing 2008.
- Rugby League - 100 years in pictures. Pages 234,235. By Ian Collis & Allan Whiticker, New Holland Publishing 2008.
- Dogs at War – Triumph, Treachery, Truth Pages 45,53,58,61,65,67,102,168,171,174,177,197,254,282. Graeme Hughes with Larry Writer, Allen & Unwin 2010.
- Macca : Bob McCarthy – My life in Rugby League New Holland Publishing 2012.
- Mud Blood and Beer : Rugby League in the 1970s By Alan Whiticker, New Holland Publishing 2014
- The Great Grand Final Heist : A mysterious tale of Tigers, Rabbitohs and an unlikely coaching hero By Ian Heads, Stoke Hill Press 2017.
- Men of League Foundation. 'Tim Pickup- A modest sporting legend' Story by Ken Vessey, November 2017. https://menofleague.com/2017/11/29/tim-pickup-oam-modest-sporting-legend/
- Masters, Roy (26 February 2019). "Federals set to nail down Pickup as all time fibro legend". Sydney Morning Herald.
