= Laurie Pickup =

Australian rugby league footballer

Personal information
- Full name: Lawrence Francis Pickup
- Born: 8 March 1916 Sydney, New South Wales, Australia
- Died: 3 June 1942 (aged 26) Great Australian Bight, off Kangaroo Island, Australia

Playing information
- Position: Five-eighth
Club
Years	Team	Pld	T	G	FG	P
1938–39	Eastern Suburbs	8	1	0	0	3
- Source: As of 18 June 2019
- Relatives: Tim Pickup (nephew)
- Military career
- Allegiance: Australia
- Branch: Royal Australian Air Force
- Service years: 1941-1942
- Rank: Leading Aircraftman
- Conflicts: World War II

Lawrence Francis 'Laurie' Pickup (8 March 1916 – 3 June 1942) was an Australian rugby league footballer who played in the 1930s.

== Playing career ==
A product of Marist Bros. Darlinghurst, New South Wales, Pickup in the mid-1930s was a talented Eastern Suburbs junior that featured in first grade between 1938 and 1939.

Pickup played five-eighth for Eastern Suburbs in the 1938 grand final that was defeated by Canterbury-Bankstown 19–6.

== War service ==
Pickup enlisted in the RAAF during World War Two in 1941. On 3 June 1942, Leading Aircraftman Pickup was killed when the Avro Anson he was flying in conducted a forced landing into the Great Australian Bight off Kangaroo Island, Australia. All 4 on board died in the crash.
