= North Sydney Bears =

Rugby league football club based on Sydney's North Shore

Club information
- Full name: North Sydney District Rugby League Football Club
- Nickname(s): The Bears, The Shoremen, The Mounties
- Colours: Primary; Red; Black; Secondary; White (since 1992)
- Founded: 7 February 1908 (Foundation Club)
- Exited: 1999, formed joint venture with Manly Warringah Sea Eagles to form Northern Eagles, (Split in 2002)

Former details
- Ground: North Sydney Oval -10,000
- Coach: Leon Latulipe
- Captain: Coby Thomas
- Competition: NSW Cup
- 2025 Season: 12th

Uniforms
Home colours

Records
- Premierships: 2: (1921, 1922)
- Runners-up: 1: (1943)
- Minor premierships: 2: (1921, 1922)
- NSW Cup: 8 (1940,1942,1955,1959,1989,1991,1992,1993)
- Wooden spoons: 9: (1915, 1917, 1919, 1932, 1941, 1948, 1950, 1951, 1979)
- Most capped: 285 – Greg Florimo
- Highest points scorer: 1274 – Jason Taylor

The North Sydney Bears are a rugby league football club based in Cammeray on Sydney's North Shore. The club currently competes in the NSW Cup, having exited the National Rugby League (NRL) following the 1999 NRL season after ninety years in the premier Australian competition. At the end of the 1999 season, the club merged with the Manly Warringah Sea Eagles to form the Northern Eagles which only lasted two years. That license was reverted to the Manly Warringah Sea Eagles, leaving the Bears without top flight representation.

The club was established in 1908, making it one of the original founding members of the New South Wales Rugby Football League, and one of Australia's first rugby league football clubs. They continued competing with some success in the first half of the 20th century in the NSWRL, and through the ARL and NRL premierships until the club created a joint venture with Manly Warringah Sea Eagles to form the Northern Eagles for the 2000 season. That partnership only lasted until 2001, when the licence reverted to the Manly Warringah Sea Eagles, although 2002 was played under the Northern Eagles name, with the Bears not returning to first grade and being represented in the NSWRL competition, the second-tier rugby league competition, where they continue to play today. The North Sydney club also field teams in the Harold Matthews Cup and SG Ball competitions.

North Sydney has had a partnership with many top-tier teams during their absence from the peak body competition, from South Sydney, the Sydney Roosters, the Melbourne Storm and most recently the new Perth Bears. Although Perth has adopted North Sydney's logo, colours and history, the North Sydney Bears are essentially an aligned interstate second-tier feeder to the planned expanded NRL competition in 2027.

There had been on-going bids to resurrect the club in the NRL as either The Bears in Sydney, or as the Central Coast Bears, based at Gosford. However, in April 2025, after initially putting negotiations on hold, the NRL entered negotiations with the Government of Western Australia, and on 8 May 2025, an agreement was reached to admit the 'Western Bears' into the competition in 2027 as the Perth Bears.

== History ==
Chart of yearly table positions for North Sydney Bears in First Grade Rugby League

North Sydney was formed as a foundation club of the newly arrived rugby league game in 1908 and like all north side sports were known as the Shoremen. The club was formed at the North Sydney School of Arts in Mount Street on 7 February 1908.

Like the other Sydney district clubs Norths arose largely from players and officials of the local Rugby Union club, Northern Suburbs Rugby Club. Most rugby league clubs in 1908 copied the local rugby union and cricket clubs' colours, however Norths chose red and black instead of the district's green, cardinal and gold.

The club initially struggled to obtain access to North Sydney Oval, but council obstruction was removed and the Shoremen played their first real home game in 1910. Many good players such as Andy Morton, Jimmy Devereaux and Sid Deane were lost to English clubs in the years after making the semi-finals in the season of 1908.

They were nearly dropped from the competition during World War I due to dwindling spectator numbers. Towards the end of the war Norths' fortunes improved, playing quality and spectators numbers increased, and they won 2 premierships in 1921–22 coached by Chris McKivat. Unfortunately, these would be their last first grade premierships, and their last grand final appearance was in 1943. when an injury riddled North Sydney were beaten by Newtown 34–7. North Sydney's Captain-coach in the Grand Final of 1943 was the future doyen of rugby league broadcasters, Frank Hyde. Hyde, who was living in Lane Cove at the time, had been forced to switch from Balmain to Norths in 1941 due to the league's residency rules which stated that a player was required to live in their club's district. As Lane Cove was in North Sydney's district, the club protested to the NSWRFL and claimed Hyde from Balmain.

The team became known as the North Sydney Bears in 1959 after accepting a sponsorship from the Big Bear supermarket at Neutral Bay, a suburb within the team's catchment area.

The 1952 season saw North Sydney reach the finals for the first time since 1943. Norths went on to make the finals again in 1953 and 1954, losing to Souths and St. George respectively. Norths then had to wait 10 years to make the finals again, this time against Balmain where they lost 11–9. The following year North Sydney came 2nd in the regular season, but were defeated 47–7 by St George, and then lost to South Sydney 14-9 the following week.

During that time, North Sydney produced arguably the greatest winger the game has ever seen in Ken Irvine. Irvine held the record for most first grade tries for one club (171) and overall (212). New South Wales representative Queenslander, Bruce Walker, captained the Bears in the final of the 1976 Amco Cup.

It would be 17 years before North Sydney made the finals series again when they finished 3rd in the 1982 season. North Sydney were coached that year by the great Ron Willey. Norths were knocked out of the finals series that year in consecutive games, first losing to Manly and then to Eastern Suburbs. In 1986 North Sydney missed the finals. They were eliminated by Balmain in a playoff for 5th place.

The nineties saw finals appearances and near misses in 1991 and 1994–1998. In that time Norths made the preliminary final 4 times but lost on each occasion. In 1991 North Sydney finished the regular season in 3rd place and defeated local rivals Manly in the first week of the finals. In the next match North Sydney had the chance to make their first grand final in 48 years if they could defeat Penrith in the semi-final. After being behind on the scoreboard 12–0, Norths fought their way back into the match to level the scores at 14–14. Normally a reliable goal kicker, Daryl Halligan missed 4 shots at goal and kicked only 1 from 5 including a penalty miss in the dying minutes. Penrith won the match 16–14 despite the fact that Norths scored more tries. North Sydney would have another chance the following week to make the grand final going up against defending premiers Canberra in the preliminary final. North Sydney went down 14–30 giving Penrith a rematch of the 1990 grand final against Canberra.

On 14 July 1994, the club was fined $87,000 for breaching the salary cap. That year they came within one match of the grand final but lost to Canberra.

North Sydney remained loyal to the Australian Rugby League during the Super League war of the mid-1990s. In the 1996 ARL season Norths came within one match of the Grand Final but lost the game to the St George Dragons 29-12.

The following year saw two separate national rugby league championships, and confirmation of the club's intention to move north to New South Wales' Central Coast.

In the 1997 season North Sydney again made the preliminary final against Newcastle at the Sydney Football Stadium. The winner of the match was to play minor premiers Manly in The Grand final. With the score 12–8 in favour of Newcastle with less than 10 minutes to play Jason Taylor set up Michael Buettner for a try which made the score 12–12. Normally a very reliable kicker and one of the most accurate in the competition, Taylor had already missed two previous conversions in the match but if he was to kick this goal it could send North Sydney through to their first grade final since 1943. Taylor ended up missing the goal. With the scores locked at 12–12, Newcastle player Matthew Johns kicked a field goal with 2 minutes to play to make it 13–12. With only seconds remaining Norths frantically threw the ball around and lost it, the ball was swooped up by Newcastle's Owen Craigie and he raced away to score a try and won the game.

In 1998, Norths finished 5th on the table and qualified for the finals. Once again they were eliminated from the finals after losing both their matches in consecutive weeks, 25–12 against Parramatta and 23–2 the following week against Canterbury.

By the start of the 1999 NRL season the future looked bright with plans for the move north well underway, but one unfortunate and apparently non-negotiable outcome of the Super League war's peace deal was a criterion designed to reduce the number of teams in the NRL to fourteen. With the NRL deeming North Sydney Oval unfit for first grade rugby league at the end of 1998, North Sydney spent the majority of the 1999 NRL season on the road playing home matches at Parramatta Stadium, Stadium Australia and Lang Park whilst they awaited their new stadium on the Central Coast to be constructed but heavy rainfall delayed the ground being built. North Sydney were allowed to return to North Sydney Oval midway through the season where they played Balmain winning 64–12. North Sydney played their final game in the top grade at the oval in round 25 against Melbourne with Norths winning 24–20. On 28 August 1999, Norths played their final game as a first grade side against the North Queensland Cowboys in Townsville. Norths won the game 28–18.

=== Northern Eagles ===
Due to having a debt of around $4 million largely because the Central Coast Stadium not being constructed in time, the North Sydney club was not considered under the NRL's inclusion criteria.

The joint venture club played out of Brookvale Oval and Central Coast Stadium at Gosford, a ground successfully lobbied and built for the Bears. However, poor on-field performances and factional fighting led to the collapse of the Northern Eagles in 2002, after only three years. After this, the Northern Eagles' licence then reverted to the Manly-Warringah Sea Eagles, leaving the foundation club out of the top flight of rugby league in Australia after more than 90 years.

=== New South Wales Cup ===
North Sydney continue to play in the second-tier NSW Cup competition, initially serving as the reserve side for the Sydney Roosters. They have also been affiliated with the New Zealand Warriors, the South Sydney Rabbitohs and the Melbourne Storm in the past, and are once again serving as a feeder club for the Melbourne Storm.

In the 2007 NSWRL Premier League the North Sydney club made the Grand Final facing off against Parramatta. They were beaten 20-15 by Weller Hauraki, scoring a controversial try with just 13 seconds to go, which many believed should not have been allowed due to a forward pass. North Sydney finished the 2008 season as NSW Cup minor premiers and were eliminated in the finals in straight sets.

In 2009, North Sydney lost to Balmain Tigers in extra time to miss out on the Grand Final 19–18. 2010 was a poor season for Norths, who received the wooden spoon. However this was turned around in the 2011 season with the North Sydney side reaching the preliminary final and losing to eventual premiers the Canterbury-Bankstown Bulldogs. Deon Apps and Curtis Johnston represented the Bears in the 2011 NSW Residents side with Johnston finishing up leading try scorer for the competition by the end of the regular season with 28 tries, Johnston would play 131 games with the North Sydney NSW Cup scoring 108 tries over 8 seasons before retiring at seasons end of 2019.

2012 saw North Sydney make the semi-finals, missing out on the minor premiership by points differential to Canterbury-Bankstown. They lost their first semi final to Newcastle Knights but had a chance to remain in the running of the competition the week after only to give up a 24–6 lead to the Newtown Jets and lose in extra time 32-30 from a Daniel Mortimer 35-metre penalty goal.

Newtown went on to beat Balmain in the 2012 NSW Cup Grand Final. In 2013, the Bears recorded several large victories in the regular season and finished third. They defeated the Newcastle Knights 32–28 in the first week of the finals, and were then eliminated by minor premiers and eventual NSW Cup premiers the Cronulla-Sutherland Sharks in the preliminary final, who recorded a convincing 38-6 win. This was the third consecutive season that the North Sydney side had been eliminated in the finals by the team which would eventually win the premiership. This was also Matt King's final game of Rugby League.

After three consecutive top four finishes, season 2014 was a horror year for North Sydney, who recorded only two wins throughout the entire season and finished with the wooden spoon, eight points below the second-last placed Manly Warringah. Season 2015 saw a strong improvement as Norths won nine games throughout the season and returned to the NSW Cup finals, only to be eliminated by Canterbury in Week One, and finished eighth.

In the 2016 NSW Cup North Sydney finished the season in 10th place and therefore missed the finals.

In the 2017 season, Norths finished 6th on the ladder and qualified for the finals. On 3 September 2017, Norths played against Newcastle in the first elimination match and were defeated 40–18 ending their season. On 19 September, it was announced that Ben Gardiner was leaving as coach of the club after two and a half years in charge.

On 11 October 2017, Shane Millard was announced as new head coach by the club. On 20 May 2018, it was revealed that North Sydney were in advanced negotiations to sign former NRL player Todd Carney. South Sydney who had a partnership with Norths at the time were not happy with this decision and declared that there would be no NRL pathway for Carney, and also declared that they might withdraw their relationship with Norths as a result. North Sydney chairman Perry Lopez said of the deal "We are the North Sydney Bears, we're not South Sydney," The decision is based on what's best for our club. At the end of the day, if they don't like the decision the Bears make, they can take it up with us. "If Souths don’t agree with what we're doing and decide it's not in our interest, we will look at the other avenues we have to ensure we have a competitive ISP side. At the end of the day, we are the North Sydney Bears and we'll look to not just have a competitive side but a winning side. This decision comes on the back of that. Our club is a 1908 foundation club,". "We are here to win games and show our fans a product they can be proud of. We are super excited to have a player of Todd Carney's calibre join the mighty North Sydney Bears".

On 21 May 2018, Carney officially signed with North Sydney, in reaction to the signing, General Manager of football at Souths Shane Richardson said "We've spoken to Norths about Todd Carney and it's our position that we will develop our young halves, as opposed to bringing in a player from outside the club in this instance," Richardson said. "'The 'Rabbitoh Way' is to build a culture that rewards young players for hard work, a culture that has respect for the club and its people, respects the members and sponsors that invest financially and emotionally into what we are doing here at South Sydney, and a culture of developing young players that want to play for South Sydney and that we see having a future NRL career". On 1 July 2018, Carney's move to North Sydney was blocked after Carney refused to pay a $15,000 release fee. The Northern Pride who Carney was contracted with demanded that Norths pay the fee which the club refused to do and hoped that a deal could be met between Carney's management team and The Queensland Cup side before the 30 June transfer window closed. Carney spoke to the media saying "I had that option with the Bears but Souths have blocked that, I'm sure something will come up". Carney's blocked move coincided with the departure of Souths contracted player Robbie Farah who spent the first 12 weeks playing for North Sydney.

On 25 August 2018, Norths lost their last game of the season against the New Zealand Warriors due to a last minute try scored by Chanel Harris-Tavita. Norths came into the game with an outside chance of making the finals but the loss ensured Norths finished outside the top 8 and with a bad points differential meant they finished in second last place on the table.

On 5 September 2018, North Sydney announced that they were ending their agreement with the South Sydney Rabbitohs to act as their reserve grade side and had signed a 5 year deal to join the Sydney Roosters as their new feeder club team for the 2019 season. Former North Sydney player and the club's leading record point scorer Jason Taylor was named as new head coach. At the end of the 2019 Canterbury Cup NSW regular season, Norths finished third on the table and qualified for the finals.

North Sydney would go on to lose both finals matches against South Sydney and Newtown. In the elimination final against Newtown, Norths lost 30-28 even though they scored more tries than the opposition. Norths player Drew Hutchison also had a bad match kicking two goals from six attempts including one from right in front to send the game into extra-time.

In 2020, due to the COVID-19 pandemic, the Canterbury Cup NSW, Ron Massey Cup and Sydney Shield competitions were cancelled. North Sydney chose to join the temporary Presidents Cup competition which involved teams from country New South Wales and the Ron Massey Cup. North Sydney would eventually reach the preliminary final in the competition but were defeated by Glebe 26-6. In the 2022 NSW Cup season, North Sydney finished third on the table and qualified for the finals. North Sydney would be eliminated from the finals in straight sets losing to Penrith and Canterbury. On 8 November 2022, the Sydney Roosters announced that they would be ending their partnership deal with North Sydney at the end of the 2023 season. The Sydney Roosters revealed that they would be fielding their own team in the NSW Cup for 2023 but would still provide some contracted players to North Sydney as part of the agreement. On 17 May 2023, North Sydney announced that they had agreed a two-year partnership with NRL club Melbourne starting in 2024. Throughout the two-year deal, Melbourne players will now be divided between three feeder clubs — the North Sydney side in the New South Wales Cup, as well as Queensland Cup sides Sunshine Coast Falcons and Brisbane Easts. In the 2023 NSW Cup, North Sydney claimed their first minor premiership since 2008 with two games to spare in the regular season. North Sydney would reach the 2023 NSW Cup grand final against South Sydney who they had lost against in the first week of the finals. In the grand final, North Sydney lead the match with only five minutes remaining before South Sydney scored a try to win 22-18. In November 2023, Jason Taylor left his position as North Sydney head coach to take up a role as Canterbury's new assistant head coach. The club then announced Pat Weisner as his replacement. In the 2024 NSW Cup season, North Sydney claimed their second consecutive minor premiership. Norths would eventually reach their second consecutive NSW Cup grand final and were favourites going into the game against fellow foundation club Newtown. However, North Sydney would lose the final 28-22. In the 2025 NSW Cup season, North Sydney could not replicate their form from the previous two seasons as they finished a 10th out of 13th on the table.

The Bears have won eight premierships in reserve grade, making them the fifth most successful club currently participating in the competition. They last won a premiership in 1993, defeating Newcastle in the grand final 5–4. The Bears have also been the only team to have participated in every season of reserve grade since the competition's inception in 1908.

=== Central Coast Bears ===
There was a movement for a return to first-grade Rugby League for the club, with the North Sydney Bears moving to Gosford (on the Central Coast, New South Wales) and becoming the Central Coast Bears. The Bears bid committee lobbied the NRL for inclusion as the next expansion team. They were headed up by Perry Lopez and Greg Florimo and had the corporate backing of a number of local Central Coast and some North Shore businesses. The proposed team would play 11 games in Gosford and one game at North Sydney Oval (Against arch rivals across the Spit and Roseville Bridges) Manly as part of a heritage or rivalry round). North Sydney legend David Fairleigh was proposed to become the inaugural coach. Prominent rugby league personalities who publicly backed the club include Phil Gould, Andrew Johns and Peter Sterling while support has also come from as high up as Federal Treasurer and North Sydney MP Joe Hockey.

Bears fan Alan McLoughlin, a Central Coast resident, set up a Facebook petition to bring the Bears to Gosford.

The Central Coast Bears had 7,200 financial members with new members joining weekly. They were aiming for 5,000 by March 2011, when the official bid was due to be handed in to the NRL but passed that mark in 2010. Mortgage House signed a three-year deal to sponsor the Central Coast Bears, also becoming a major jersey sponsor for the Bears. In November 2010, it was reported that Ken Sayer, CEO of Mortgage House, planned to underwrite the bid for $10 million to help ensure their financial equity was shored up when the bid was submitted. Both major political parties showed support for the Central Coast Bears bid in 2010–2011, with Labor supporting the bid by granting $100,000 for the Bears, and the Liberal party supporting the bid by promising to acquire land at Mt Penang, Central Coast, NSW to build a state-of-the-art Sports Centre of Excellence in the lead up to the 2011 New South Wales state election.

With weekly membership drives and ongoing community involvement, the Central Coast Bears targeted entry into the NRL in 2015, but this date passed without admission. In 2016, it was reported that there were moves for the Bears to buy the Gold Coast Titans franchise. The General Manager of Norths and most capped player of the club Greg Florimo said at the time of North Sydney's first public interest in purchasing The Gold Coast licence as "the last chance". Florimo then went on to say "I don't see too many other options presenting themselves, The energy and finance that we put into the Central Coast bid really didn't come to fruition ... so we're going hard to the plate on this".

Throughout 2017 there was much media speculation around North Sydney and their moves to purchase the struggling Gold Coast Titans licence when it went on sale by The NRL. North Sydney reportedly placed a $7 million bid to purchase The Gold Coast Licence and as part of the bid if they were to be successful was to rename the side The Gold Coast Bears and continue to play games at Robina plus taking two games to North Sydney Oval with one game being held against fierce rivals The Manly-Warringah Sea Eagles. The Gold Coast colors would also change to Norths red and black with the logo being changed as well to fit the proposed new club. On 3 November 2017, it was revealed that Norths had failed in their bid to purchase The Gold Coast licence. On 14 December 2017, it was officially announced by The NRL that the consortium of Darryl Kelly and self made property tycoon Rebecca Frizelle had won the bid to purchase The Gold Coast Titans.

On 22 February 2018, it was announced that North Sydney were in talks with a Western Australian consortium with the possibility of creating a franchise and to seek inclusion into The NRL.

On 11 November 2018, new North Sydney CEO David Perry said he was aiming at seeing a North Sydney/Central Coast bid come to fruition when the current television deal ends at the end of 2023. Perry suggested that the NRL should look at creating a promotion/relegation system similar to other sports around the world. Perry went on to say "You need 12 and 12, so 24 key markets, and stricter criteria about those clubs around their funding model which means all of the 24 may not fit the top tier criteria, it may only be 16-18 franchises that make the cut, their catchment areas, their population, and their commercial growth, because currently I believe a lot of clubs haven’t been accountable as much as they should have. They've been too reliant on funding from the NRL and haven't been measurable enough".

On 9 August 2019, rugby league immortal Andrew Johns said that having a team on the Central Coast would be a "no-brainer". Johns went on to say "I think it's a must, We keep talking about Perth, but it’s so far away I imagine the costs would be astronomical getting everyone over there and back. At the Central Coast they have a stadium up there and they have a huge junior base. There are so many players play up there, so you can get the best kids aspiring to play for the Central Coast".

On 25 September 2019, Australian entrepreneur John Singleton spoke to former NRL player Matthew Johns about a team being placed on the Central Coast. Singleton said "We had the players and the lifestyle on the Central Coast once you get people up there they go: 'wow, how good's this'. I can live on the beach." Singleton then spoke about the Gold Coast Titans and how their bid beat Singleton's initial bid for a Central Coast team in 2006 saying "They had no money and no stadium, and we did have a stadium built for North Sydney. And was a year late, that's all. And we had a $50 million bank guarantee, so we would have been strong. It made sense to relocate one of the Sydney teams to the Central Coast."

=== The Bears ===
After the Northern Eagles went defunct, the North Sydney Bears have continued to field teams in several grades of the NSW rugby league competitions, and were behind the failed Central Coast Bears bid in the mid-2000s. But as recently as April 2021 the Bears have expressed their intent on eventually returning the brand to the NRL competition. In 2018 they had explored the possibility of establishing a Western Bears franchise based in Perth.

On 27 October 2021, the Bears revealed their intention to return to the NRL, coinciding with a new logo. The proposed franchise, to be known simply as The Bears, would split home matches between various regional centres including Wagga Wagga, Dubbo, Tamworth, Coffs Harbour and Central Coast, along with major cities Perth, Adelaide, Hobart and Darwin that are otherwise currently without NRL representation. They would allocate between four and six games at a potentially upgraded North Sydney Oval. The Bears intend to retain their 113-year history and traditional black and red colours.

=== Perth Bears ===
In August 2024, the North Sydney Bears and a Western Australian consortium headed by Cash Converters founders the Cumins family, signed off on an agreement to lodge an application for the Western Bears to enter a team in the 2027 NRL season. The logo would have been red, white and black with yellow as a nod to Western Australia, not the Western Reds as had been incorrectly reported. On 8 October 2024, the bid was rejected by the NRL. On 12 December 2024, North Sydney and the West Australian consortium missed out on selection to be the 18th team in the competition. The NRL instead decided to choose the PNG bid, but with ARL Commission chairman Peter V’landys stating "The Western Australian situation is still progressing".

On 24 April 2025, the NRL agreed to a $50 million deal in principle with the Western Australian Government, thereby securing the return of the Bears brand to the competition after 28 years. On 8 May 2025, the NRL confirmed that the Perth Bears franchise would enter the competition from 2027.

== North Sydney Leagues Club ==
Rebranded as Norths, the North Sydney Leagues Club was established by the district's football club, the North Sydney Bears, in 1955 in a house in the Sydney suburb of Neutral Bay. In 1964, the club moved to new premises, its current location, in Abbott Street, Cammeray.

In the fifty years the new building has stood, a number of redesigns and refurbishments have taken place. In 2014 facilities comprised two dining areas, function rooms, a 530-seat auditorium, a fitness and wellness centre, indoor and outdoor lounge areas, a bottle shop, a TAB, two squash courts, a courtesy bus service, a members rewards program and a multi-level car park for 320 vehicles. Membership in 2016 stood at 21,500.

In 1996, Norths merged with the North Sydney Bowling Club, which was established in 1888 and is the second oldest club (by one day) in Australia. This Bowling Club was transformed and re-branded as The Greens North Sydney in November 2014. Norths also amalgamated with the Seagulls, a border club at Tweed Heads on the far north coast of New South Wales, the oldest provincial rugby league club in Australia.

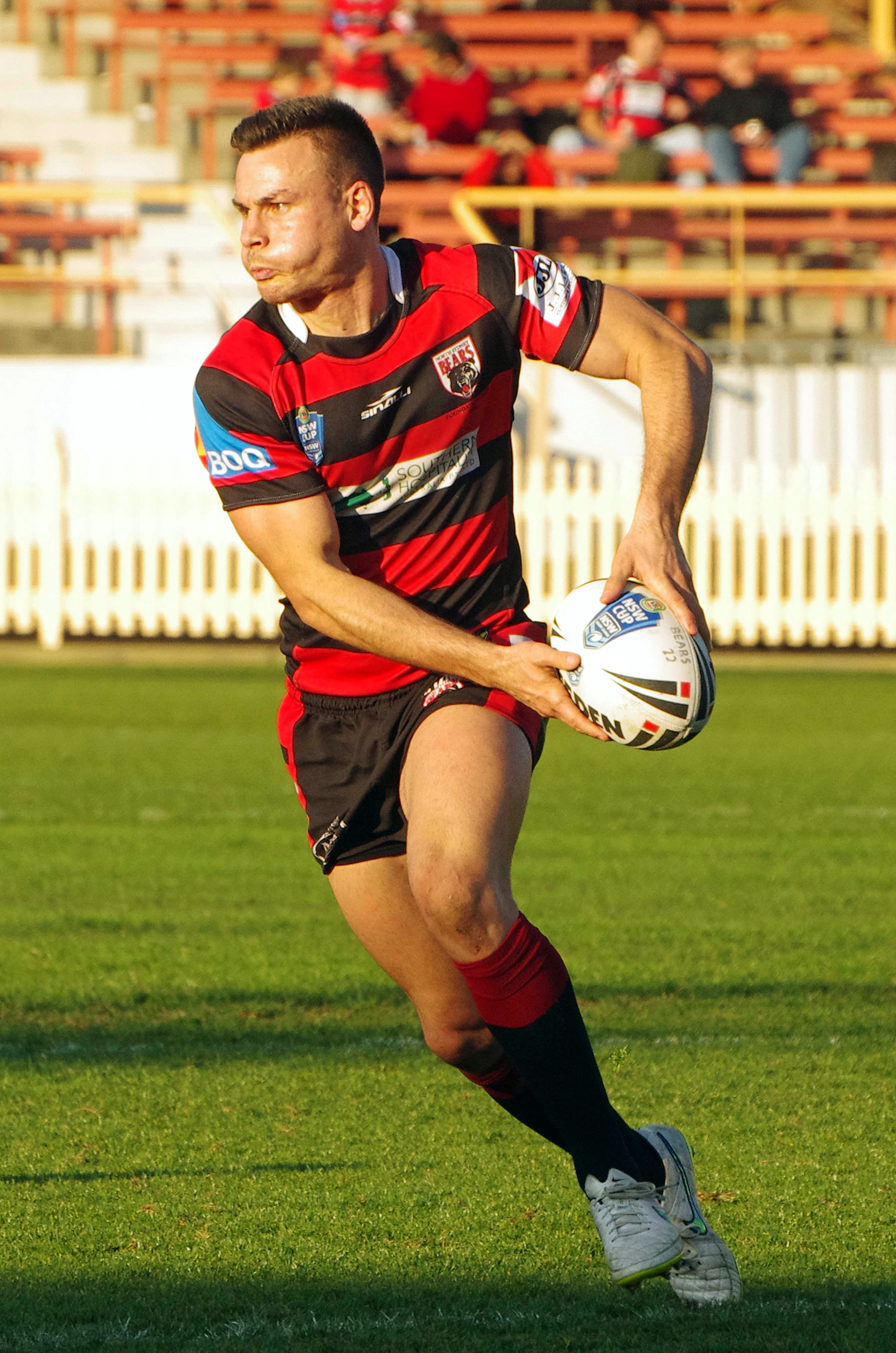
Darren Nicholls playing for the North Sydney Bears in the New South Wales Cup

== Local catchment area ==
Despite partially and fully leaving the NRL after the 1999 and 2001 seasons respectively, the Bears keep a large fanbase on Sydney's Lower North Shore, Upper North Shore, Hornsby Shire, (Although its support is strongest on the Lower North Shore). The North Sydney Bears are the only Sydney team without NRL representatives to have a Junior Rugby League District. The North Sydney Junior Rugby League District, In which clubs compete in a joint district with Manly Warringah. The following LGAS (With the number of Junior Teams in the area) fall within the North Sydney Bears catchment area:

- Hornsby Shire (4 Teams)
- Ku-ring-gai Council (1 Team)
- Lane Cove Council (1 Team)
- Mosman Council (0 Teams)
- North Sydney Council (1 Team)
- City of Willoughby (1 Team)

The following junior teams are affiliated with the North Sydney Bears:

- Asquith Magpies, Hornsby Shire
- Berowra Wallabies, Hornsby Shire
- Ku-ring-gai Cubs, Ku-ring-gai Council (Play home games in Turramurra)
- Lane Cove Tigers, Lane Cove Council
- North Sydney Brothers, North Sydney Council (Note: The North Sydney Junior Rugby League website lists Tunks Park as being in Northbridge which is a part of the City of Willoughby council. However, Tunks Park is located in Cammeray and is part of the North Sydney Council Local Government Area)
- Northwest Hawks, Hornsby Shire, Dural
- Pennant Hills-Cherrybrook Stags, Hornsby Shire
- Willoughby Roos, City of Willoughby

== Rivalries ==
=== Rivalry with the Manly-Warringah Sea Eagles ===
Prior to the ill-fated Northern Eagles joint venture from 2000 to 2002, the rivalry between Manly and foundation club Norths was arguably one of rugby league's fiercest. Manly were admitted into the premiership in 1947 with North Sydney at the time being one of the main advocators for a team to be in Manly. In Manly's first season, most of the side was made up of former Norths players including captain Max Whitehead who played for Norths in their 1943 grand final defeat to Newtown. The intense feelings between the two sides continued over the next couple of decades fuelled as players switched between the two clubs. The biggest defection occurred in 1971 when Norths life member and one of the game's greatest wingers Ken Irvine joined Manly. Former Manly and North Sydney player Phil Blake said of the rivalry "It was certainly a game you looked forward playing in. The ground was always packed and it was always a great afternoon". In 2016, Norths and Manly played their final competitive senior game against each other in the Intrust Super Premiership NSW competition where Norths won the match 32–18. Manly had announced earlier in the 2016 season that they would be merging their lower grade sides with the Blacktown Workers teams to become the Blacktown Workers Sea Eagles. The two clubs would then compete against each other with Norths and Manly Harold Matthews Cup, SG Ball and Jersey Flegg teams. In 2025, Manly returned to the NSW Cup after their partnership with Blacktown Workers ended meaning North Sydney and Manly would compete against each other again in a senior competition.

== Club colours ==
When founded in 1908 the club adopted colours of red and black in a hooped stripes jersey. Unlike most of the other new rugby league clubs in Sydney in 1908, Norths did not follow the established district colours of the local rugby union and cricket clubs' colours, which were green, cardinal and gold. Norths have kept to red and black ever since 1908. The hooped jersey in various forms was used from 1908 to 1941.

== Mascot ==
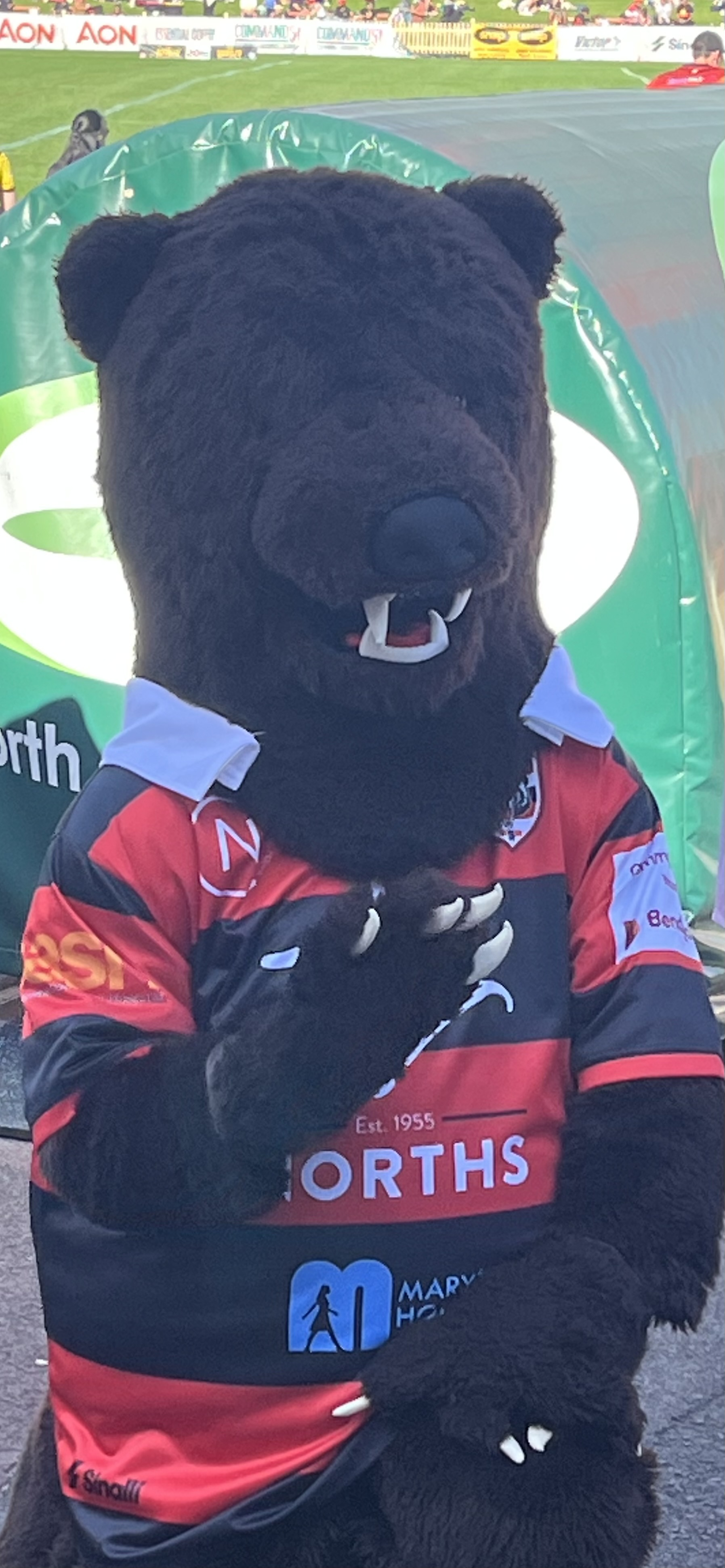
Barney the Bear in May 2025

Barney the Bear is the official mascot of the North Sydney Bears.

== Club songs ==
The Bears have had numerous songs throughout their history, the first was set to the tune of Teddy Bears' Picnic, some lyrics from the original were retained, although it is no longer used today. The official team song is "Mighty Bears come marching home", which is set to the tune of When Johnny Comes Marching Home. The team also has a run on song largely consisting of the words "Stand aside, here come the Mighty Bears", although the club website doesn't officially give the song a name.

== 2026 squad ==
2026 North Sydney Bears Squad
First team squad			Coaching staff
Abiarthur Tuilaepa; Alfred Smalley; Ammaron Gudgeon; Aykan Bosnali; Bayden Moran; Caleb Tohi; Coby Thomas (C); Compton Fuatimau; David Tui; Declan Pettet; Ethyn Martin; Fred Pupu; Harradyn Wilson	Harrison McKeon; Jahoiyakim Afoa; Jake Toby; Joshua Cook; Joshua Finau; Kieran Hayman; Lafitani Tuinauvai; Matthew French; Matt Komolafe; Matthew Lewin; Matt Stimson; Nathaniel Roache; Noah Johannssen	Phillip Makatoa; Puna Fonua; Raymond Tuaimalo Vaega; Riley Meyn; Riley Wake; Sean Vaivelata; Sione Tupouniua; Thomas Steadman; Tuipulotu Katoa; TJ Toevai; Tylor Bunting; Tyrell Neiufi; Villiami Pupu	Head coach: Leon Latulipe; Legend: (c) Captain(s); (vc) Vice-captain(s); Updated: 12 April 2026; Source(s): North Sydney Bears

== Team of the Century ==
On 26 August 2006 the club announced their "Team of the Century".

Position	Player
FB	Brian Carlson
WG	Ken Irvine
CE	Jim Devereux
CE	Greg Florimo
WG	Harold Horder
FE	Tim Pickup
HB	Duncan Thompson
PR	Gary Larson
HK	Ross Warner
PR	Billy Wilson
SR	David Fairleigh
SR	Mark Graham
LK	Peter Diversi
Bench	Sid Deane
Bench	Ken McCaffery
Bench	Billy Moore
Bench	John Gray
Coach	Chris McKivat

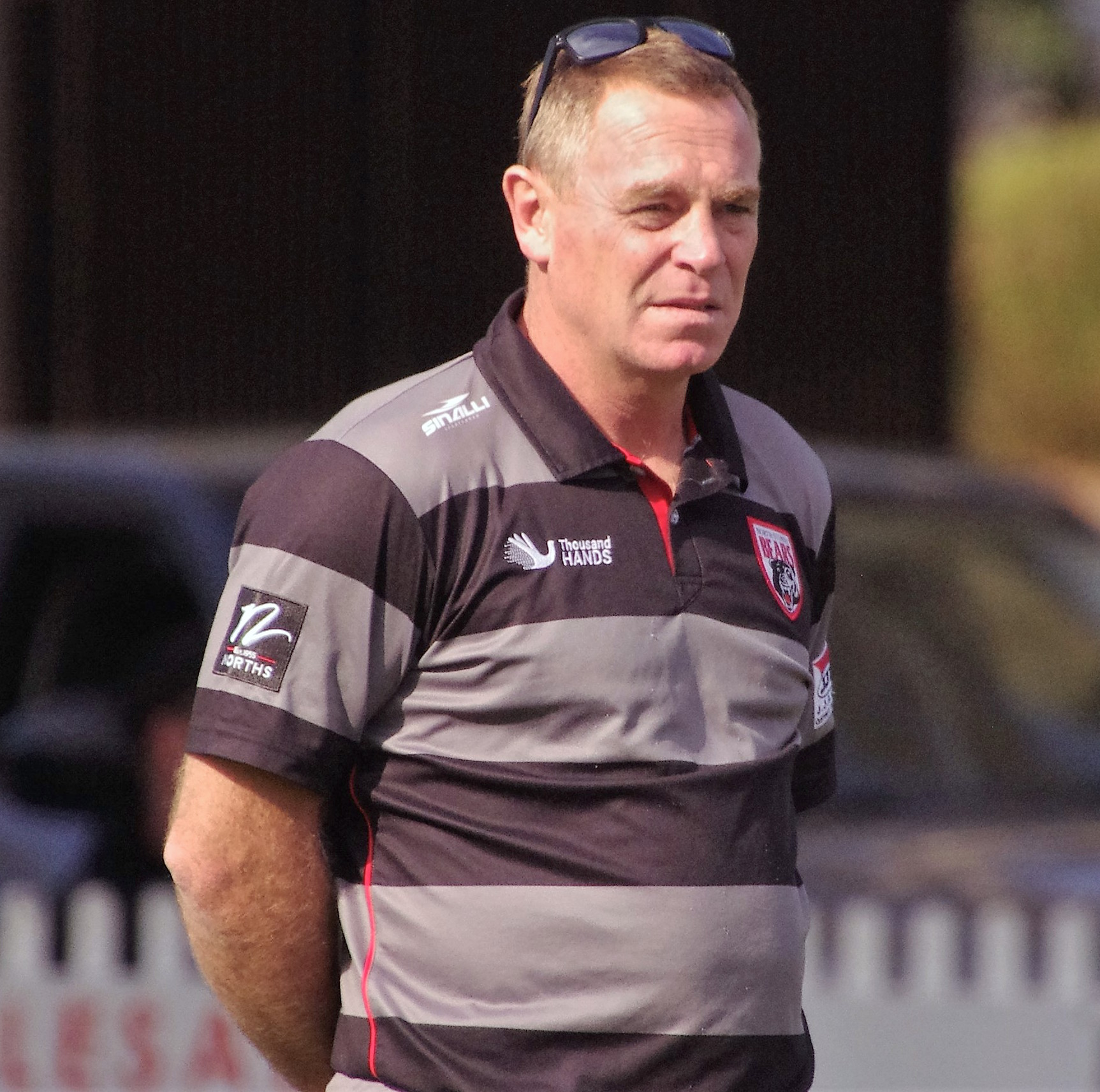
Local Junior Greg Florimo who was named in the team of the century is the Bears all time capped player and is considered synonymous with the club

== Former players of note ==
Australia

- George Ambrum
- Martin Bella
- Cec Blinkhorn
- Albert Broomham
- Kerry Boustead
- Brian Carlson
- Brett Dallas
- Peter Diversi
- David Fairleigh
- Mario Fenech
- Greg Florimo
- Bill Hamilton
- Harold Horder
- Frank Hyde
- Ben Ikin
- Ken Irvine
- Peter Jackson
- Les Kiss
- Gary Larson
- Denis "Dinny" Lutge
- Ken McCaffery
- Don McKinnon
- Billy Moore
- Mark O'Meley
- Tim Pickup
- Matt Seers
- Jason Taylor
- Duncan Thompson
- Bruce Walker
- Lloyd Weier
- Billy Wilson

New Zealand

- Fred Ah Kuoi
- Olsen Filipaina
- Clayton Friend
- Mark Graham
- Daryl Halligan
- Sean Hoppe

England

- John Gray

Wales

- Merv Hicks
- Jim Mills

== Coaches ==
No.	Name	Years	G	W	L	D	%	Premierships	Runners-up	Minor Premierships	Wooden spoons
1	Denis Lutge	1915–1916	28	7	21	0	25%		—		—
2	George Green	1918–1919	28	4	21	3	14%		—		—
3	Chris McKivat^	1920–1922	40	29	10	1	73%	1921, 1922	—	1921	—
4	Jimmy Devereux	1924–1925	20	9	10	1	45%	—	—	—	—
5	Tom McMahon	1928	13	6	7	0	46%	—	—	—	—
6	Leo O'Connor	1929	16	6	7	3	38%	—	—	—	—
7	Tedda Courtney	1930	14	2	11	1	14%	—	—	—	—
8	Tom Wright	1931	14	6	8	0	43%	—	—	—	—
9	Arthur Edwards	1933	14	5	8	1	36%	—	—	—	—
10	Herman Peters	1934	14	4	8	2	29%	—	—	—	—
11	Frank Burge^	1935, 1945	32	17	14	1	53%	—	—	—	—
12	Jim Craig	1936	13	7	5	1	54%	—	—	—	—
13	Laurie Ward	1937	8	3	5	0	54%	—	—	—	—
14	Bob Williams	1938–1939	28	8	18	2	29%	—	—	—	—
15	Arthur Halloway	1940–1941	28	7	20	1	25%	—	—	—	1941
16	Roy Thompson	1941	14	3	10	1	21%	—	—	—	1941
17	Jack O' Reilly	1942	14	5	9	0	36%	—	—	—	—
18	Frank Hyde	1943–1944, 1950	49	17	28	4	35%	—	1943	—	1950
19	Harry Forbes	1946	14	5	9	0	36%	—	—	—	—
20	Cliff Pearce	1947–1948	36	12	21	3	33%	—	—	—	1948
21	Harry McKinnon	1949	18	5	12	1	28%	—	—	—	—
22	Laurie Doran	1951	18	5	13	0	28%	—	—	—	1951
23	Ross McKinnon^	1952–1953, 1959	58	32	25	1	55%	—	—	—	—
24	Rex Harrison	1954–1955	37	20	15	2	54%	—	—	—	—
25	Bruce Ryan^	1956	18	5	12	1	28%	—	—	—	—
26	Trevor Allan	1957–1958	36	18	17	1	50%	—	—	—	—
27	Greg Hawick	1960, 1985	33	12	21	0	36%	—	—	—	—
28	Bob Sullivan	1961–1962	36	13	21	2	36%	—	—	—	—
29	Fred Griffiths	1963–1966	75	39	32	4	52%	—	—	—	—
30	Billy Wilson	1967	22	8	13	1	36%	—	—	—	—
31	Colin Greenwood	1968	16	2	14	0	13%	—	—	—	—
32	Ross Warner	1968	4	0	4	0	—	—	—	—	—
33	Roy Francis	1969–1970	44	17	25	2	39%	—	—	—	—
34	Merv Hicks	1971–1972	44	12	30	2	27%	—	—	—	—
35	Noel Kelly	1973–1976	89	33	52	4	37%	—	—	—	—
36	Bill Hamilton	1977–1978	45	15	28	2	33%	—	—	—	—
37	Tommy Bishop^	1979	22	2	20	0	9%	—	—	—	1979
38	Ron Willey^	1980–1982	72	31	39	2	43%	—	—	—	—
39	John Hayes^	1983–1984	50	22	26	2	44%	—	—	—	—
40	Brian Norton	1985–1986	34	15	18	1	44%	—	—	—	—
41	Frank Stanton^	1987–1989	68	25	40	3	37%	—	—	—	—
42	Steve Martin^	1990–1992	69	35	32	2	51%	—	—	—	—
43	Peter Louis^	1993–1999	161	96	58	7	60%	—	—	—	—
44	Kieran Dempsey^	1999	8	2	6	0	25%	—	—	—	—

^ Did not play first grade for Norths

== Club records ==
=== Club records ===
5 Biggest Wins

- 62 points, 62–0 against North Queensland Cowboys at North Sydney Oval on 23 August 1998
- 54 points, 60–6 against North Queensland Cowboys at North Sydney Oval on 16 April 1995
- 52 points, 64–12 against Balmain Tigers at North Sydney Oval on 30 May 1999
- 52 points, 55–3 against Penrith at North Sydney Oval on, 16 July 1978
- 45 points, 45–0 against Cumberland at Wentworth Park on 25 July 1908

Biggest Loss

- 56 points, 3–59 against Glebe at Wentworth Park on 17 July 1915.

Highest Points

- 64 points, Norths defeated Balmain Tigers 64–12 at North Sydney Oval on 30 May 1999.

Highest Score Conceded

- 60 points, Brisbane Broncos defeated Norths 60–6 at QSAC Stadium on 26 April 1998.

Most first grade appearances for the club

- 285, Greg Florimo (1986–1998)
- 233, Gary Larson (1987–1999)
- 211, Billy Moore (1989–1999)
- 210, Norm Strong (1949–1962)
- 193, David Fairleigh (1989–1999)
- 189, Don McKinnon (1977–1987)
- 186, Ross Warner (1963–1974)
- 176, Ken Irvine (1958–1970)
- 170, Mark Soden (1989–1999)
- 157, George Ambrum (1966–1974)

Most Tries for the club

- 171, Ken Irvine in 176 games (1958–1970)

Most Goals for the club

- 563, Jason Taylor in 147 games (1994–1999)

Most Points for the club

- 1,274, Jason Taylor (32 tries, 563 goals, 20 field goals) in 147 games (1994–1999)

Most Points in a season

- 242, Jason Taylor (10 tries, 98 goals, 6 field goals) in 1997

Most Consecutive Wins

- 9 matches, 24 July 1920 – 14 May 1921
- 9 matches, 13 June – 14 August 1994

Most Consecutive Losses

- 12 matches, 3 June – 26 August 1979

Undefeated Season

- 1921 (8 games: 7 wins 1 draw)

Home and Away Attendances

- 47,398 at Sydney Cricket Ground vs St George on 9 May 1959
- 23,089 at North Sydney Oval vs Manly on 13 May 1994

Finals Attendance Record

- 60,922 at Sydney Cricket Ground vs Newtown on 4 September 1943 NSWRFL Grand Final

Finals Appearances

- 1908, 1922, 1928, 1935, 1936, 1943, 1952, 1953, 1954, 1964, 1965, 1982, 1991, 1994, 1995, 1996, 1997, 1998

No finals were played in 1921.

=== Club honours ===
Premierships: (2) 1921, 1922

Runners-Up: (1) 1943

Minor Premierships: (2) 1921, 1922

Midweek Cup [as Amco Cup]: Runners-up: 1976

==== Friendly/Youth honours ====
Reserve Grade Premierships: 1940, 1942, 1955, 1959, 1989, 1991, 1992, 1993

Runners up in Reserve Grade: 1921, 1926, 1936, 1939, 1944, 1957, 2007, 2023, 2024

Third Grade Premiership [and equivalent competitions]: 1937, 1945, 1946, 1959

President's Cup: 1918, 1933

H 'Jersey' Flegg Memorial Trophy: 1998

Lennox Cup: 1949

Sevens: Runners-Up: 1996, 1997

City Cup: Winners: 1920, 1922 Runners-Up 1913, 1959

League Cup: Runners-Up: 1919

State Championship: Runners-Up: 1945

Pre-season Competition: Runners-Up: 1964, 1966, 1977

Channel 10 Challenge Cup: Winners: 1978

== Australian internationals ==
- George Ambrum 1972
- Martin Bella 1986–1989
- Tom Berecry 1911–1912
- Cec Blinkhorn 1921–1922
- Albert Broomham 1909–1912
- Michael Buettner 1996
- Brian Carlson 1958–1961
- Tedda Courtney 1910
- Arch Crippin 1936
- Brett Dallas 1996
- Sid Deane 1908–1914
- Jim Devereux 1908–1909
- Peter Diversi 1954–1955
- David Fairleigh 1994–1996
- Greg Florimo 1994–1995
- Nevyl Hand 1948–1949
- Harold Horder 1920–1922
- Ben Ikin 1998
- Ken Irvine 1959–1968
- Clarrie Ives 1921–1922
- Peter Jackson 1991–1992
- Les Kiss 1986
- Gary Larson 1995–1997
- Dinny Lutge 1908–1909
- Ken McCaffery 1957
- Don McKinnon 1982
- Keith Middleton 1950
- Billy Moore 1995–1997
- Andy Morton 1908–1909
- Fred Nolan 1937–1938
- Herman Peters 1921–1922
- Tim Pickup 1972–1974
- Con Sullivan 1910–1914
- Bob Sullivan 1954
- Duncan Thompson 1919–1922
- Roy Thompson 1937–1938
- Bruce Walker 1978
- Laurie Ward 1937–1938
- Lloyd Weier 1965–1966
- Billy Wilson 1963

== See also ==
- National Rugby League reserves affiliations
- List of rugby league clubs in Australia
