= Central Coast Bears =

Proposed rugby league club

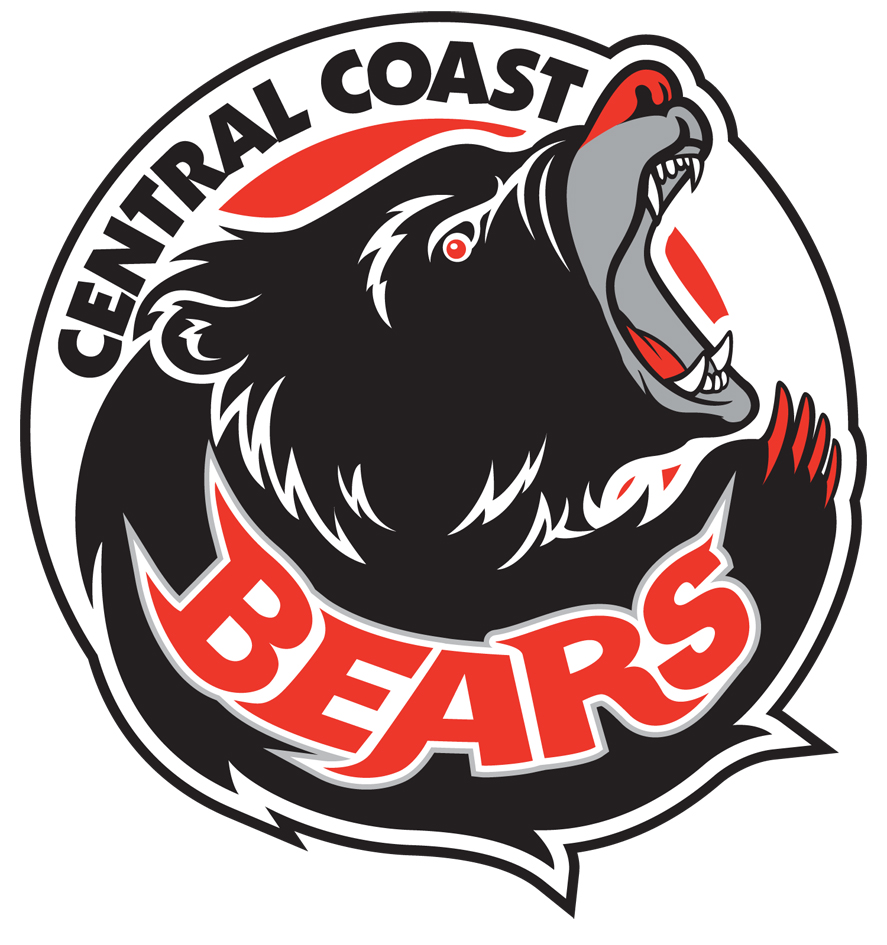

Club information
- Full name: Central Coast Bears
- Colours: Red; Black
- Founded: 2009

Current details
- Ground: Central Coast Stadium (20,059)
- CEO: David Perry
- Competition: National Rugby League

The Central Coast Bears were a proposed professional rugby league club based on the Central Coast of New South Wales, Australia.

They were trying to be included in an expanded National Rugby League competition.

The proposed team would have played 11 games in Gosford and one game against Manly at North Sydney Oval, in the annual Heritage Round. Prominent rugby league personalities who have publicly backed the club include Phil Gould, Andrew Johns and Peter Sterling while support has also come from as high up as former M.H.R. for North Sydney, Joe Hockey.

== History ==
In the mid to late 1990s, North Sydney were one of the first teams to consider relocation as the Super League war loomed. At the end of the 1998 NRL season, North Sydney at the time played their final game at North Sydney Oval with the club due to relocate to the Central Coast at the start of the 1999 NRL season. The move was delayed by construction issues and inclement weather at their new stadium. The North Sydney club were still confident of relocating to the Central Coast at the start of the 2000 NRL season. However, with the NRL's rationalisation policy, the club fell victim to this and ended up merging with the clubs arch-rivals Manly. The newly merged team Northern Eagles would play at the Central Coast Stadium between 2000 and 2002.

In 2006, the Central Coast were one of three bidders for the next team to be handed a NRL licence. The Gold Coast were ultimately successful in their bid, beating both the Central Coast and the Wellington Orcas.

In 2012, the NRL announced it was opening up talks about expansion again but ultimately decided to close negotiations until the end of 2014.

In 2018, Rugby League Commission chairman Peter Beattie declared that expansion was back on the NRL's agenda with Central Coast one of the teams mentioned.

On 11 November 2018, new North Sydney CEO, David Perry, said he was aiming at seeing a North Sydney/Central Coast bid come to fruition when the current television deal ends at the end of 2022. Perry suggested that the NRL should look at creating a promotion/relegation system similar to other sports around the world. Perry went on to say: "You need 12 and 12, so 24 key markets, and stricter criteria about those clubs around their funding model which means all of the 24 may not fit the top tier criteria, it may only be 16-18 franchises that make the cut, their catchment areas, their population, and their commercial growth, because currently I believe a lot of clubs haven’t been accountable as much as they should have. They’ve been too reliant on funding from the NRL and haven’t been measurable enough".

On 9 August 2019, rugby league "Immortal", Andrew Johns, said that having a team on the Central Coast would be a "no-brainer". Johns went on to say "I think it’s a must, We keep talking about Perth, but it’s so far away I imagine the costs would be astronomical getting everyone over there and back. At the Central Coast they have a stadium up there and they have a huge junior base. There are so many players play up there, so you can get the best kids aspiring to play for the Central Coast".

On 25 September 2019, Australian entrepreneur John Singleton spoke to former NRL player Matthew Johns about a team being placed on the Central Coast. Singleton said "We had the players and the lifestyle on the Central Coast once you get people up there they go: 'wow, how good’s this'. I can live on the beach". Singleton then spoke about the Gold Coast Titans and how their bid beat Singleton's initial bid for a Central Coast team in 2006 saying "They had no money and no stadium, and we did have a stadium built for North Sydney. And was a year late, that’s all. And we had a $50 million bank guarantee, so we would have been strong. It made sense to relocate one of the Sydney teams to the Central Coast".

However, by October 2021, the franchise had ended their campaign in gaining admission as a stand-alone club, as the North Sydney Bears revealed their intention to return to the NRL, coinciding with a new logo. The proposed franchise, to be known simply as The Bears, would split home matches between various regional centres including Wagga Wagga, Dubbo, Tamworth, Coffs Harbour and Central Coast, along with major cities Perth, Adelaide Hobart and Darwin that are otherwise currently without NRL representation. They would allocate between four and six games at a potentially upgraded North Sydney Oval. The Bears intend to retain their 113-year history and traditional black and red colours.

== Catchment ==
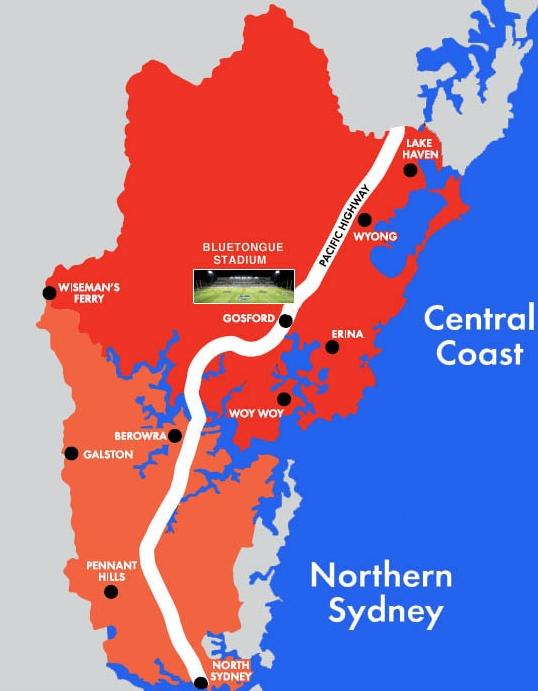
Central Coast Bears catchment

The Central Coast Bears catchment would have spanned a vast and populated area from Mosman on Sydney's Lower North Shore to Lake Munmorah at the northern peak of the Central Coast of New South Wales. Within this catchment area are close to 1,000,000 residents (in 2012, 609,533 were residents of the northern Sydney Local Government Areas of Hornsby, Hunters Hill, Ku-ring-gai, Lane Cove, Mosman, North Sydney, Ryde and Willoughby and 325,295 in Central Coast Council ).

== Junior participation ==
The Central Coast Bears have 23 junior clubs in their catchment area. Within these 23 clubs are over 7,000 players currently participating in rugby league at various levels. Many famous NRL players started out playing at the junior level within this catchment, including Matt Orford, Akuila Uate, Chris Heighington, Mitchell Pearce, Kieran Foran and Nicho Hynes.

== Membership ==
The Central Coast Bears started a membership structure in 2009, setting themselves a target of 5,000 members by March 2011. This goal was reached in December 2010, three months early, and as of November 2011, the Central Coast Bears had over 7,600 financial members.

== Notable supporters ==
- Joe Hockey

== See also ==
- Boston Bears
- Perth Bears
- List of sports clubs inspired by others
