= Herman Peters =

Australia international rugby league footballer & coach

Personal information
- Born: 18 April 1899 North Sydney, New South Wales, Australia
- Died: 10 September 1989 (aged 90) Lane Cove, New South Wales, Australia

Playing information
- Position: Centre
Club
Years	Team	Pld	T	G	FG	P
1917–25	North Sydney	101	62	2	0	190
Representative
Years	Team	Pld	T	G	FG	P
1921–22	Australia	0	0	0	0	0
1921–23	New South Wales	2	1	0	0	3
1919–23	Metropolis	3	7	0	0	21

Coaching information
Club
Years	Team	Gms	W	D	L	W%
1934	North Sydney	14	5	0	9	36
- Source: &

Herman Peters (1899–1989) was an Australian rugby league footballer who played in the 1910s and 1920s. He was educated at North Sydney Boys High School. An international representative centre, he played his club football with North Sydney in the NSWRFL premiership and won two premierships with the club.

== Playing career ==
Peters played eight games of the 1921 NSWRFL season in which the North Sydney team won the premiership without having to play a final. As part of Norths' champion backline, he gained selection on the 1921–22 Kangaroo tour of Great Britain, along with clubmates, Blinkhorn, Rule, Horder, Ives and Thompson. He went on to play in the 1922 NSWRFL season's Premiership Final for Norths, scoring a try to help them claim consecutive premierships. In the 1923 NSWRFL season, Peters was the premiership season's top try-scorer. He scored 16 tries in 18 games.

== Post playing ==
Peters coached North Sydney in the 1934 NSWRFL season. He later went on to be a National Selector for the ARL. He was known as "The Grand Old Man" of the North Sydney Bears club and was a staunch supporter right up to his death in 1989. Before his death in 1989, Peters was quoted as saying "Hoping for Norths to win another one has kept me going I've watched them all the years since 1922, and I want to be there on the day it happens".
