= George Ambrum =

Australian rugby league footballer

Personal information
- Full name: George Ambrum
- Born: 15 January 1943 Thursday Island, Queensland, Australia
- Died: 10 December 1986 (aged 43) Cessnock, New South Wales, Australia

Playing information
- Position: Wing
Club
Years	Team	Pld	T	G	FG	P
1966–74	North Sydney	156	54	1	0	164
Representative
Years	Team	Pld	T	G	FG	P
1972	Australia	2	2	0	0	6

George Ambrum (1943–1986) was a retired Australian rugby league player who used to play in the 1960s and 1970s.

== Background ==
Ambrum was born at Thursday Island, and played his junior football at Cairns, Queensland. He came down to join the North Sydney Bears in 1966.

== Playing career ==
Ambrum played nine seasons with the North Sydney Bears from 1966 to 1974 and played over 150 games for the club. In 1972, George Ambrum was selected to play for Australia in the Trans-Tasman series and scored two sensational tries in the first Test. He played in one other Test on that tour and was a natural selection for the World Cup tour at the end of that year, but a knee injuries wrecked his chance at selection. George Ambrum is listed on the Australian Players Register as Kangaroo no. 460. After his long and successful Sydney career had ended he moved to Cessnock, New South Wales and played in the local Newcastle competition and won a premiership with Cessnock in 1977.

== Death ==
Ambrum died suddenly while playing touch football at Cessnock, New South Wales on 10 December 1986, aged 43.
